= BMW M5 =

High-performance vehicle of the BMW 5 series

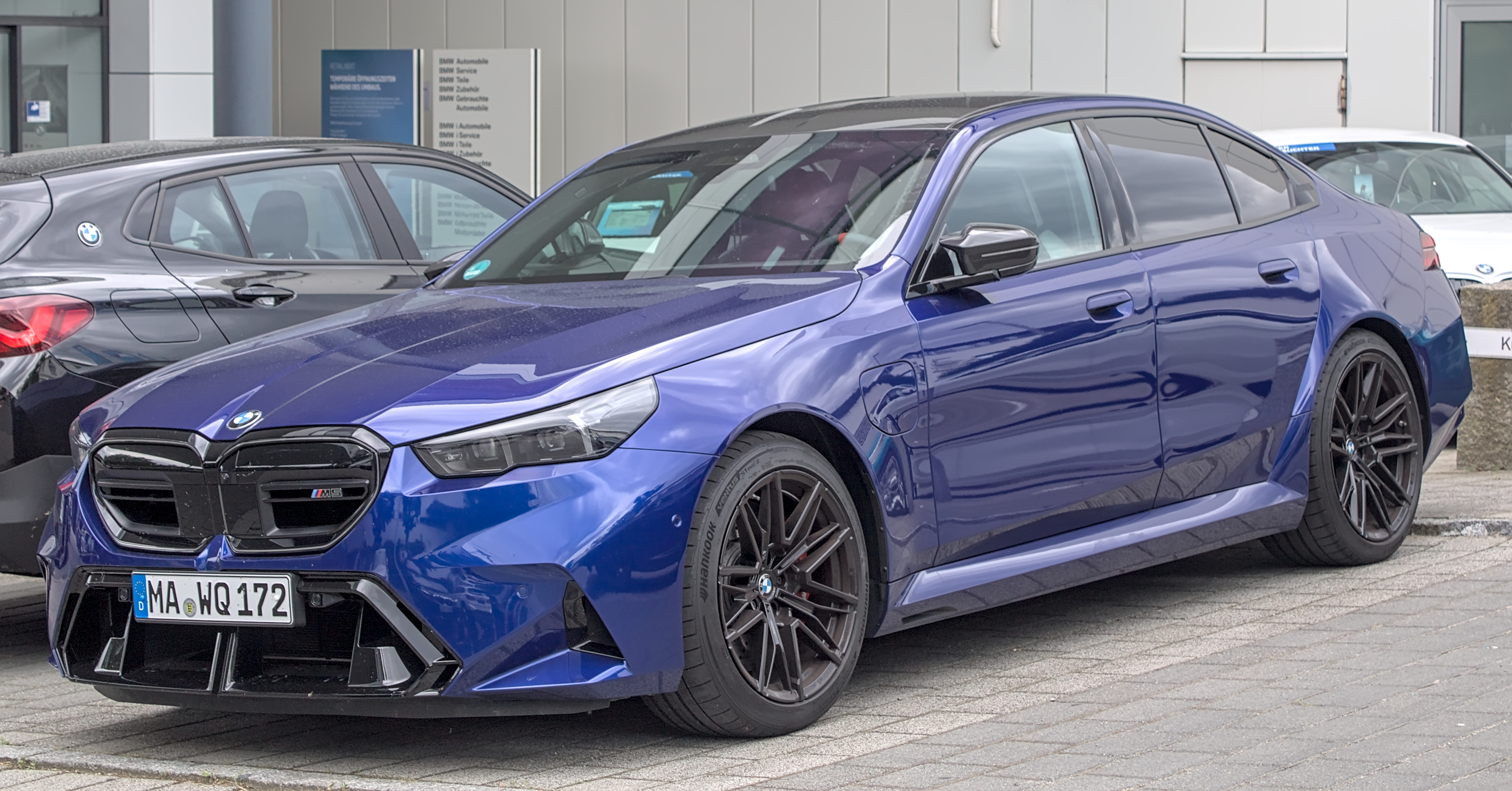
- 2025 BMW M5 (G90)

Overview
- Manufacturer: BMW M
- Production: 1984–present

Body and chassis
- Class: Executive car (E)
- Layout: Front-engine, rear-wheel-drive (1984–2016), Front-engine, all-wheel-drive (2017–present)
- Related: BMW 5 Series; BMW M6 / BMW M8

The BMW M5 is a high-performance version of the BMW 5 Series automobile developed by BMW's motorsport division, BMW M GmbH, built since 1984 with periodic interruptions. The M5 has continuously been produced in the saloon body style, in some countries also as an estate.

The first M5 model was hand-built beginning in late 1984 on the E28 535i chassis with a modified engine from the M1 that made it the fastest production saloon at the time. M5 models have been produced for every generation of the 5 Series since 1984, with occasional gaps in production (1995 to 1998, 2023 to 2024).

== E28 M5 (1984–1988) ==
BMW M5 (E28)
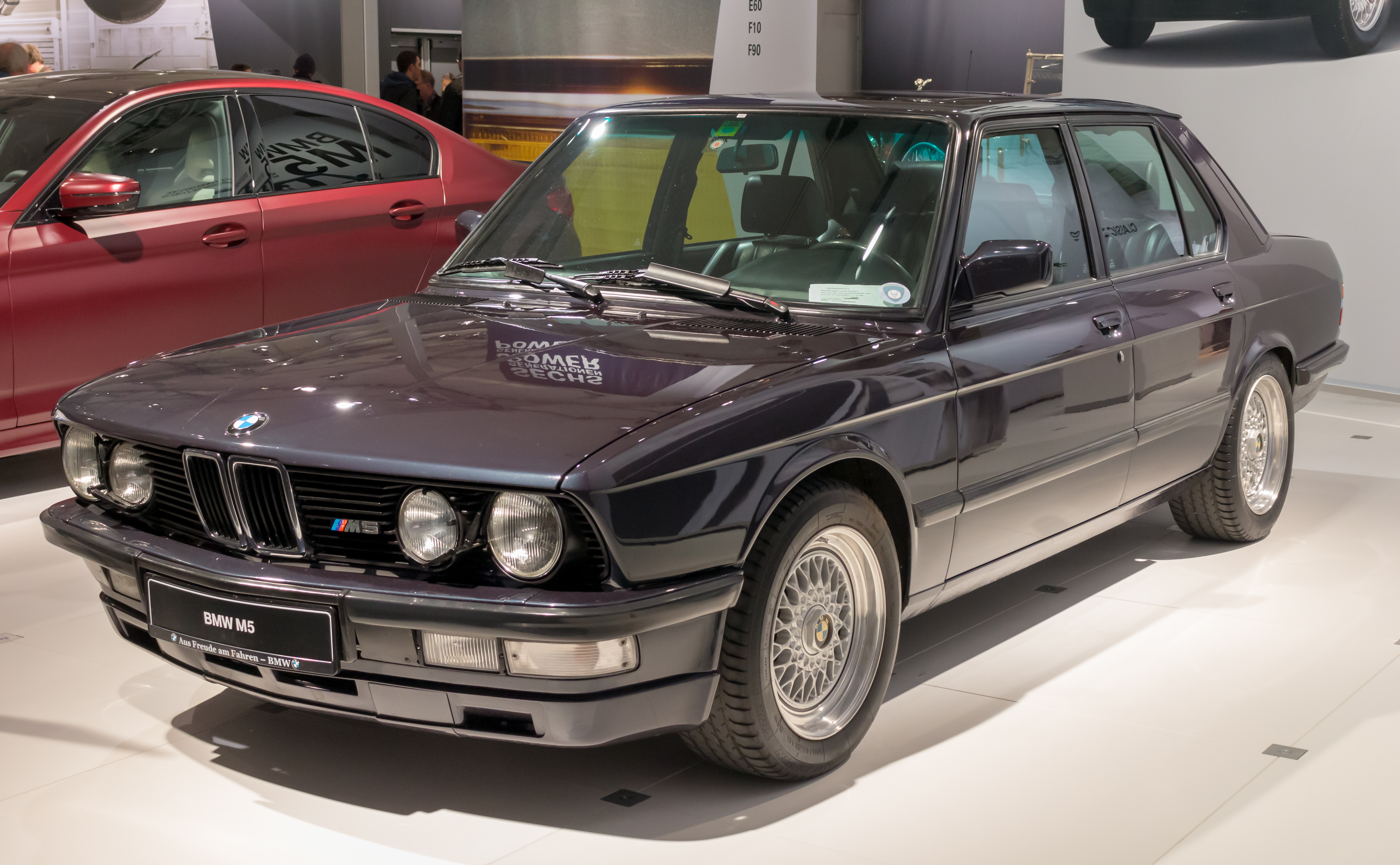

Overview
- Production: 1984–1988
- Designer: Claus Luthe

Body and chassis
- Body style: 4-door saloon
- Layout: Front-engine, rear-wheel-drive
- Related: BMW 5 Series (E28)

Powertrain
- Engine: 3.5 L M88/3 or S38 I6
- Transmission: 5-speed manual

Dimensions
- Wheelbase: 2,625 mm (103.3 in)
- Length: 4,620–4,800 mm (181.9–189.0 in)
- Width: 1,699 mm (66.9 in)
- Height: 1,415 mm (55.7 in)
- Curb weight: 1,410 kg (3,109 lb)

The first BMW M5, based on the E28 5 Series, was manufactured from October 1984 to June 1988. It made its debut at the Amsterdam Motor Show in February 1985. It was based on the 535i chassis with various mechanical changes, most notably the M88/3 engine (shared with the E24 M635CSi grand tourer coupé) which was an updated version of the engine used in the M1 sports car. At its launch, the E28 M5 was the fastest production saloon in the world.

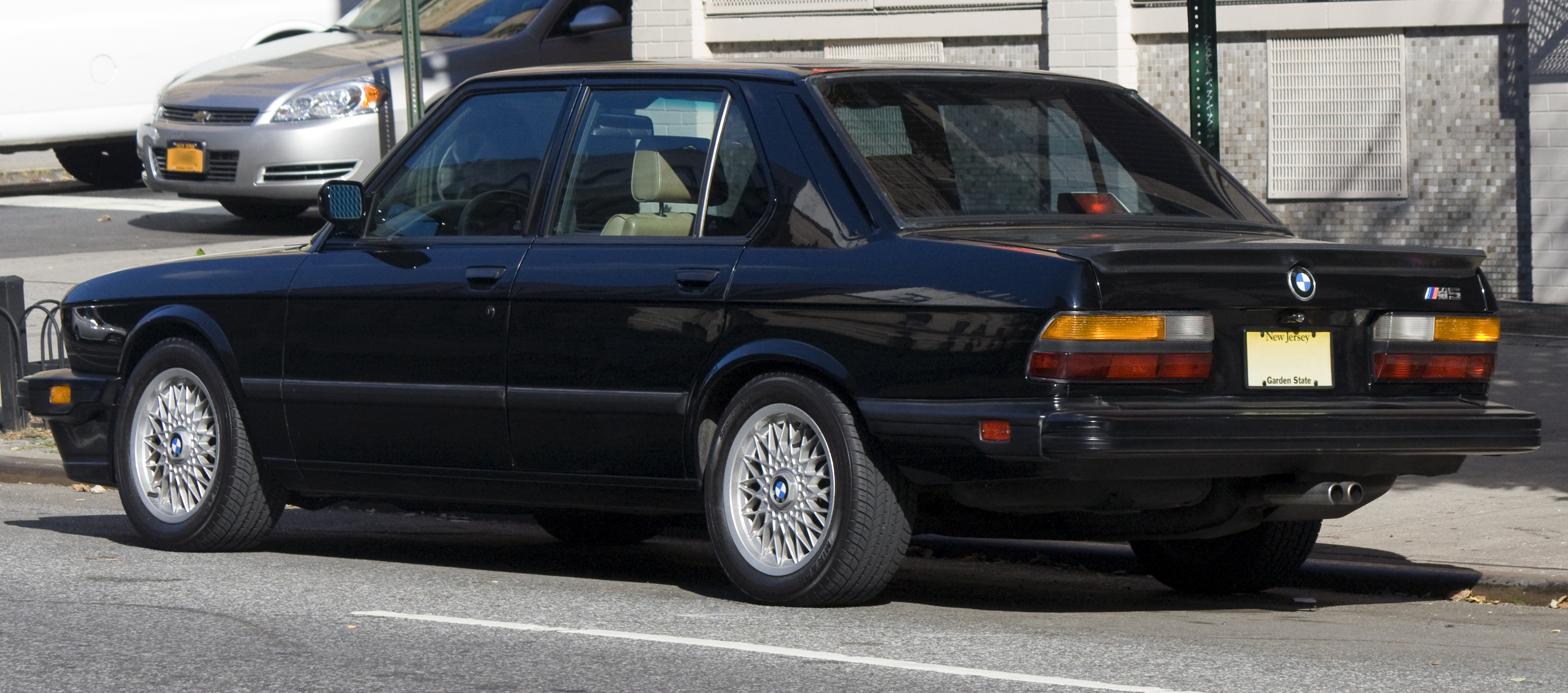
Rear 3/4 view (US-spec bumpers)

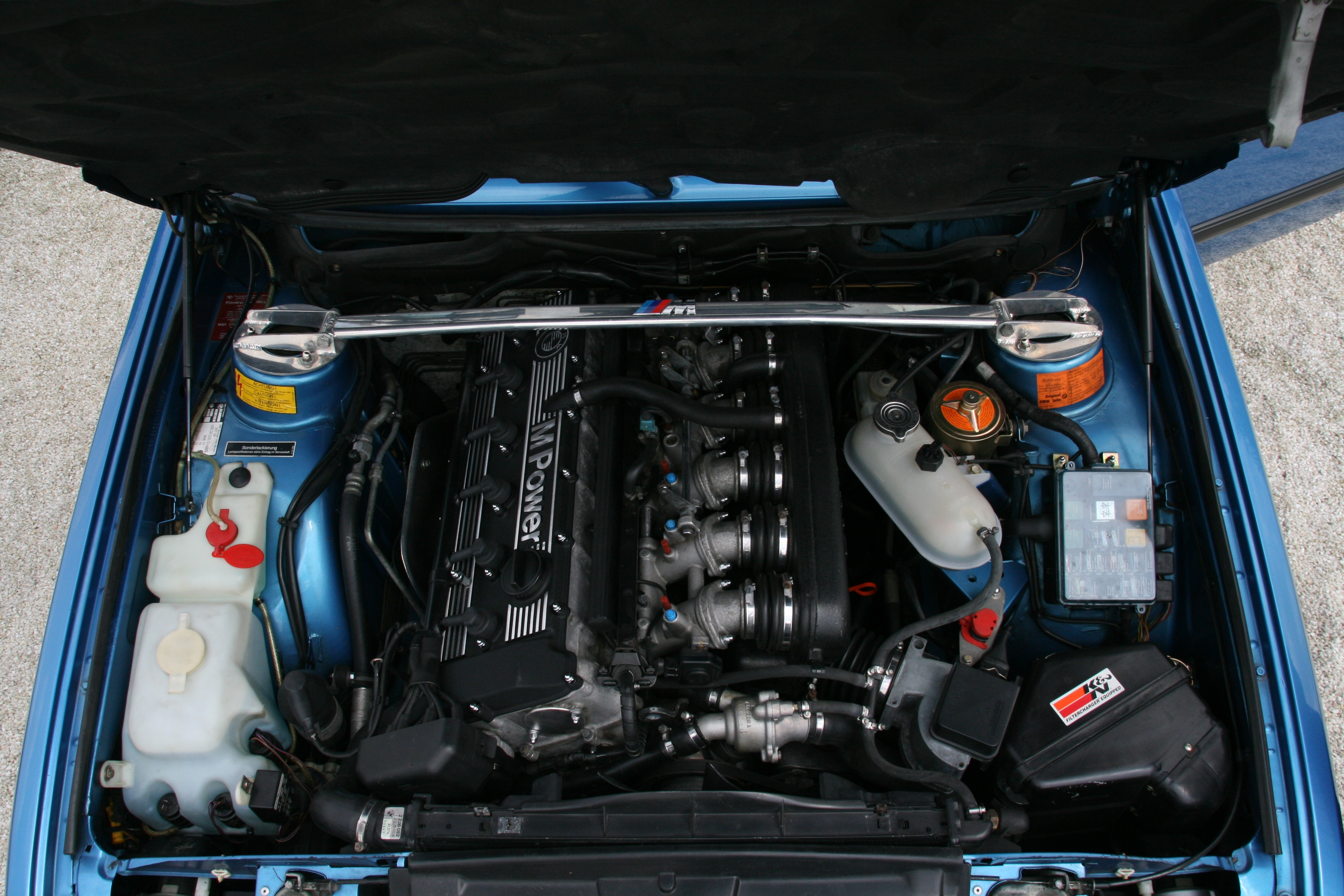
BMW M88/3 straight-six engine

The official markets for the E28 M5 were Europe, Great Britain, the United States, Canada, and South Africa. The European and South African cars used the M88/3 engine which has a power output of 210 kW (286 PS; 282 hp).

Cars sold in the United States and Canada used a detuned version of the M88/3 called the S38B35, which was equipped with a catalytic converter and has a power output of 191 kW (256 hp). Due to an extended production run that exceeded BMW's original forecast of production volumes, a class action lawsuit was launched by owners in the United States. The results of this class action was that owners were given a voucher for US$4,000 in 1993. Production of North American specification M5 commenced in November 1986 and ended in November 1987.

Aside from 96 cars which were assembled in kit form at BMW's Plant in Rosslyn, South Africa, all cars were assembled by hand in Germany. Assembly took place at BMW Motorsport's plant in Preussenstrasse in Munich prior to the 1986 factory summer vacation. Thereafter, the M5 production was moved to Daimlerstrasse in Garching where the remainder were built. Production of the M5 continued until November 1988, almost a year after BMW had ceased production of regular E28 models. With a total production of 2,241 units, the E28 M5 remains among the rarest regular production BMW Motorsport cars – after the M1 (456 units), M5 (E34) Touring (891 units) and the 850CSi (1,510 units).

== E34 M5 (1988–1995) ==
BMW M5 (E34)
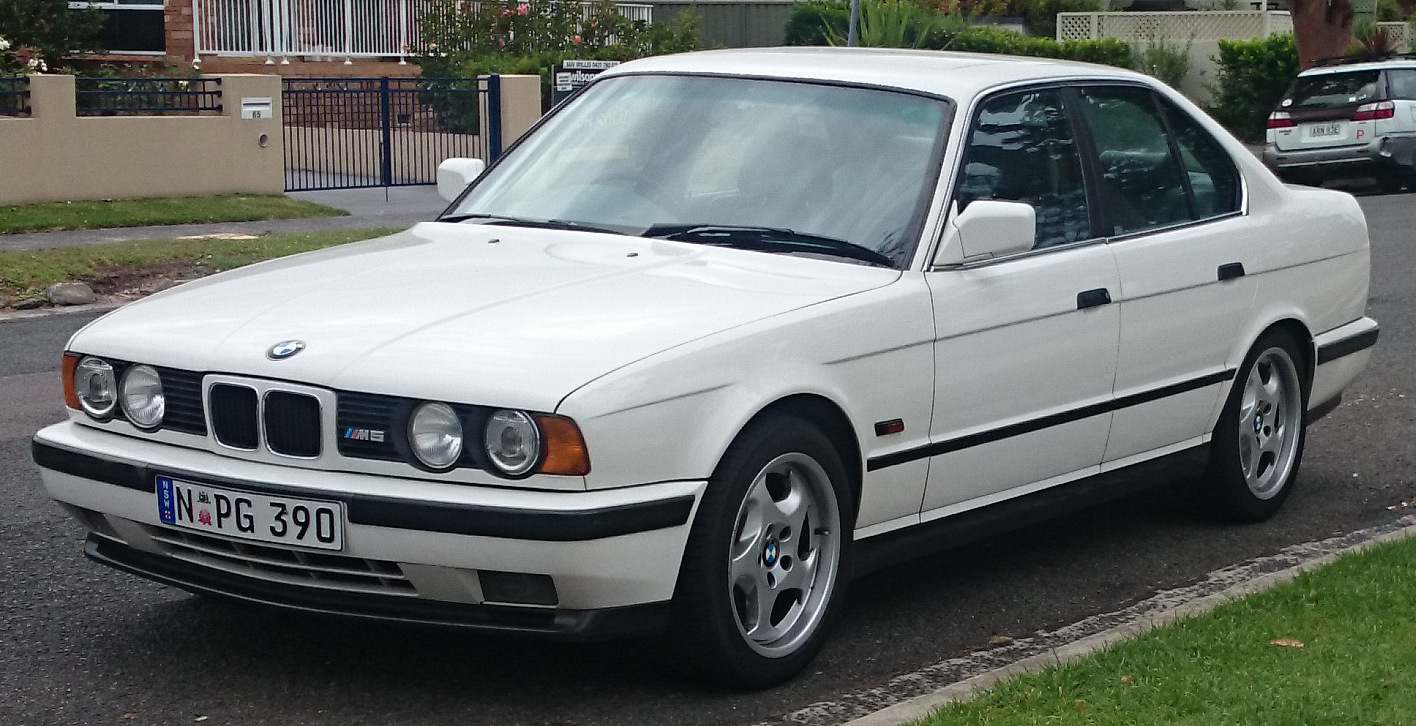

Overview
- Production: 1988–1995
- Designer: Ulf Weidhase

Body and chassis
- Body style: 4-door saloon; 5-door estate
- Layout: Front-engine, rear-wheel-drive
- Related: BMW 5 Series (E34)

Powertrain
- Engine: 3.6 L (3,535 cc) S38 I6; 3.8 L (3,795 cc) S38 I6
- Transmission: 5-speed manual (1988–1994); 6-speed manual (1994–1995)

Dimensions
- Wheelbase: 2,760 mm (108.7 in)
- Length: 4,720 mm (185.8 in)
- Width: 1,750 mm (68.9 in)
- Height: 1,392 mm (54.8 in)
- Curb weight: 1,745 kg (3,847 lb)

The E34 generation of the M5 was produced from September 1988 to August 1995. Powered by the S38 straight-six engine, an evolution of the previous generation's straight-six, the E34 was initially produced in a saloon body style, with a second LHD Touring (estate/wagon) version following in 1992.

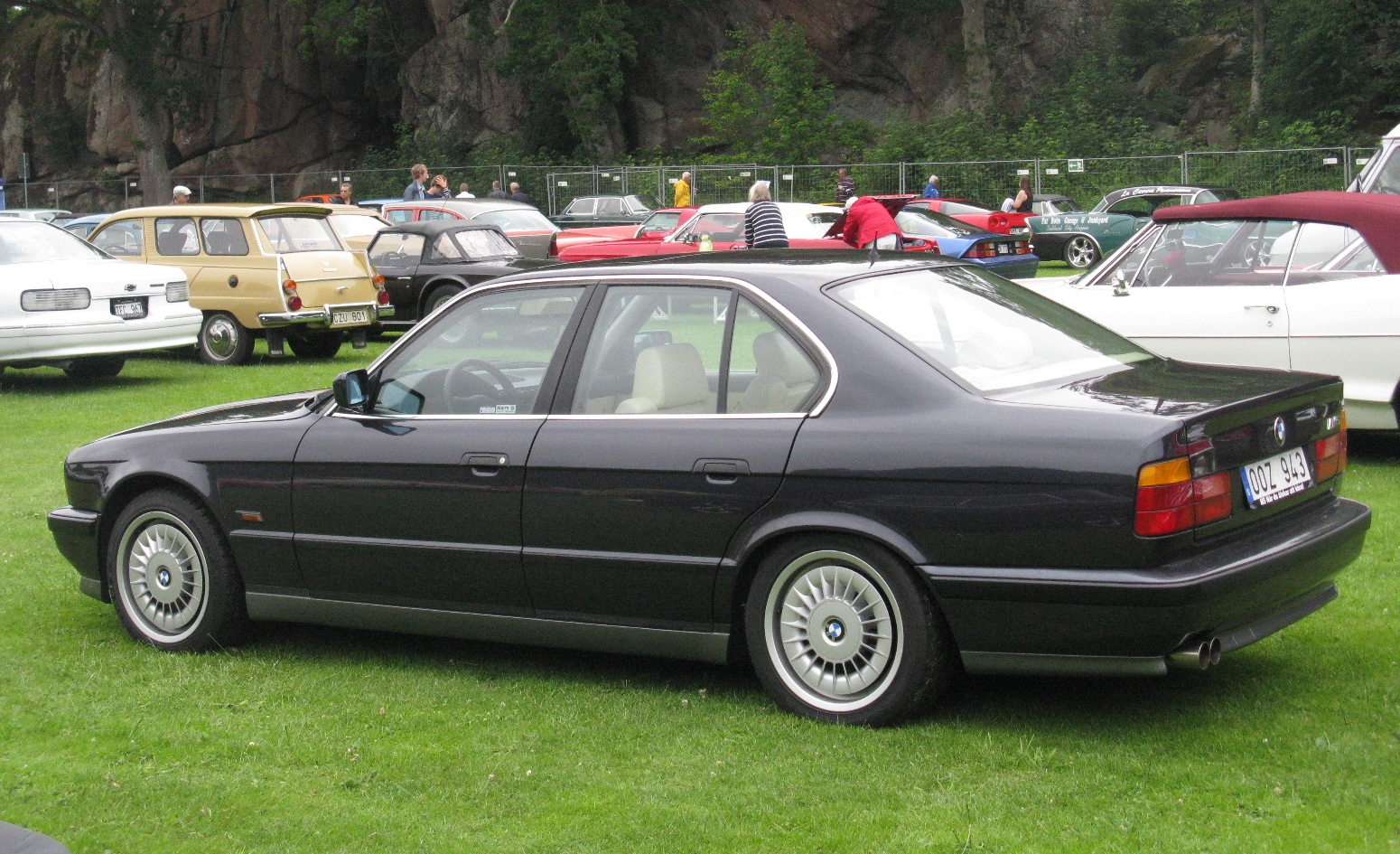
Sedan- rear 3/4 view

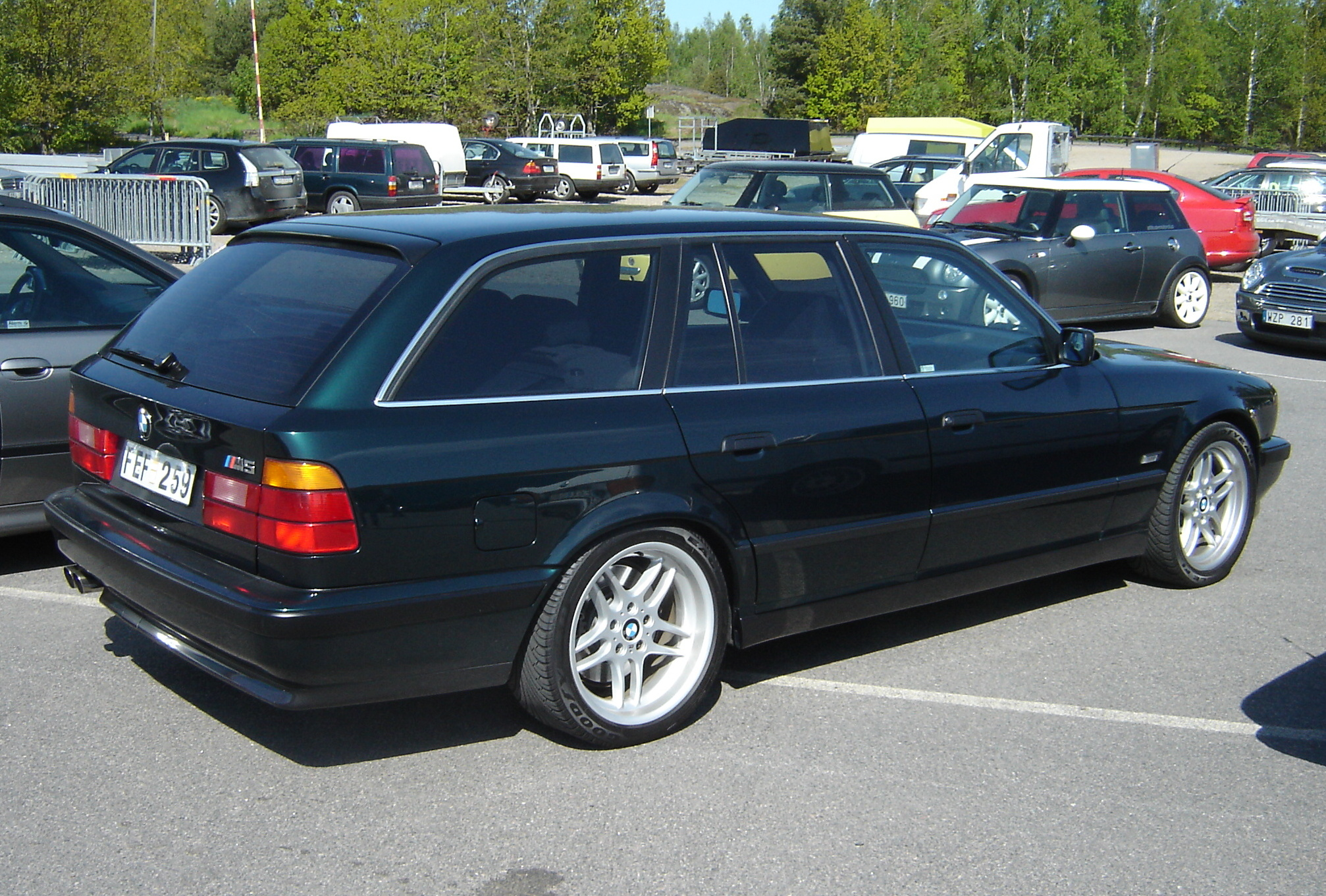
Wagon- rear 3/4 view

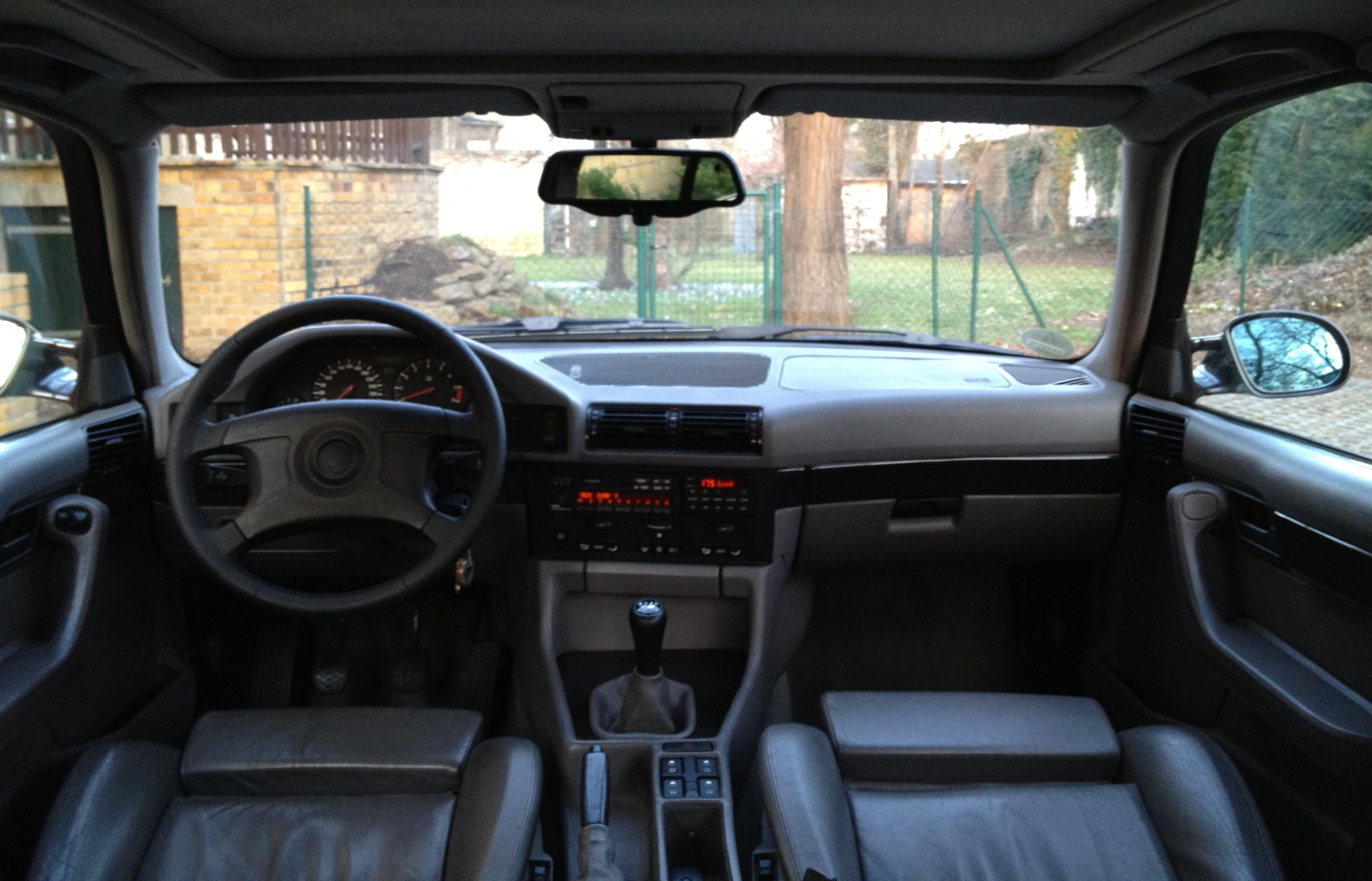
E34 M5 interior

Production of M5 models began with the painted bodyshell of an E34 5 Series at the BMW Dingolfing plant. The shells were then transported to BMW M GmbH in Garching, where the car was assembled by hand over a period of two weeks. Only the South African M5 was entirely assembled at the Rosslyn, South Africa assembly plant from complete knock-down kits supplied from Garching, Germany. The M5 Touring, which was BMW M Division's first estate as well as the last hand-built M car, saw 891 units produced. Total production of the E34 M5 was 12,254 units, of which 8,344 were 3.6-litre and 3,910 were 3.8-litre. In the North American market, only the 3.6-litre version was sold (model years 1991–1993).

Cosmetic changes to the exterior from the standard E34 included unique front and rear bumpers and side rocker panels, contributing to a drag coefficient of 0.32 (from 0.30), while interior updates included a unique gearshift surround, different trunk lining with storage partitions and rear headrests.

The second-generation M5 was introduced with the S38B36 engine, which generated 232 kW (315 PS; 311 hp) at 6,900 rpm and 360 N⋅m (266 lb⋅ft) of torque at 4,750 rpm, touting a factory 0-97 km/h (60 mph) acceleration time of 6.3 seconds. Top speed was electronically limited to 250 km/h (155 mph).

=== Updates ===
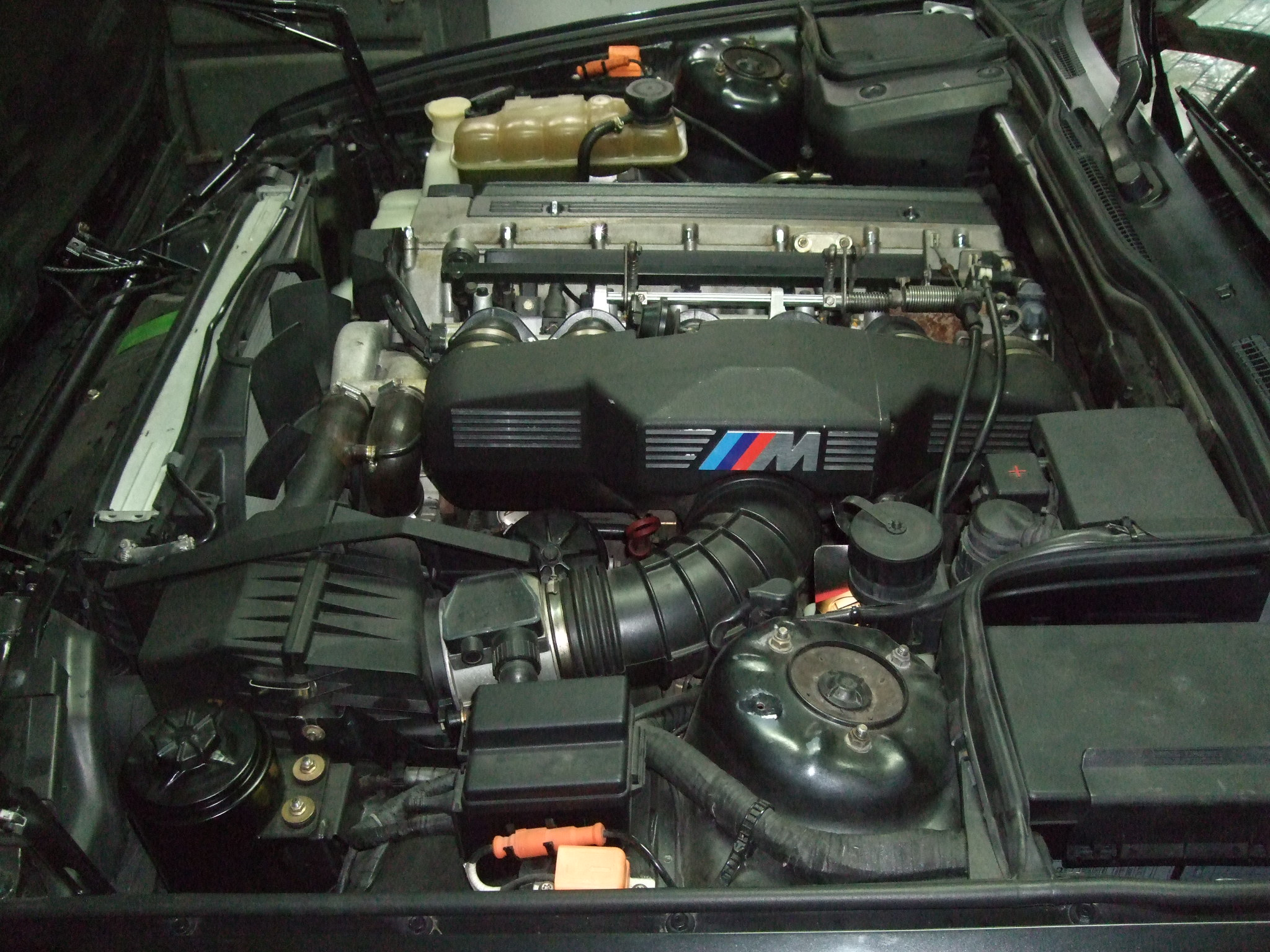
BMW S38 straight-six engine (3.8 L version)

In late 1991 (1992 model year), the engine was upgraded to the 3.8-litre S38B38, with exception to North America and South Africa, which continued with the 3.6-litre engine due to emission laws. Power increased to 250 kW (340 PS; 335 hp), leading to a factory 0-97 km/h (60 mph) acceleration time of 5.9 seconds, and the ignition changed to a distributor-less system with each cylinder having an individual coil. BMW also used a dual-mass flywheel in place of the single in the 3.6-litre version for a smoother idle and throttle input at the expense of response. The standard self-leveling suspension (SLS) system, which maintained a constant ride height in the rear, was replaced with Electronic Damper Control (EDCIII+), an electronically controlled and hydraulically regulated system that can switch between comfort "P" setting and a more track-oriented "S" setting.

A 6-speed Getrag 420G manual transmission was introduced in 1994.

=== M-System wheels ===
The M5 came with an unusual wheel design. From 1988 to 1992, the M5 featured the three-piece Style 20 "M-System" wheels, which consisted of magnesium, unidirectional bolted-on wheel covers and an aluminium assembly with concentric fins that bolt on to the front of the black, 5-spoke forged aluminium wheel. According to BMW, the cover increased outside airflow to the brake assembly by 25 percent to improve cooling.

In 1992 BMW changed the design to the "M-System II" (nicknamed "throwing stars") which improved brake cooling from the combination of the larger openings and fins placed in the driving direction.

In May 1994, the M5 switched to 18-inch Style 37 "M Parallel" wheels that did away with the finned cover entirely.

=== Special editions ===
There were four special editions of the E34 M5. The Cecotto, Winkelhock and 20 Jahre editions which were offered as LHD Euro specification models while the RHD UK Limited edition was only sold in the United Kingdom.

In 1991, BMW asked two race drivers to design their "ideal" version of the E34 M5. The Cecotto Edition M5, named after Johnny Cecotto, featured several luxury items fitted, including Nappa leather for the steering wheel and heated seats. A total of 22 Cecotto E34 M5s were produced with options of having either Lagoon Green metallic (code number 266) and Mauritius Blue metallic paint (code number 287) and Light Parchment or Light Silvergrey upholstery for the interior.

The other M5 special edition dedicated to a race driver was the Winkelhock Edition, named after touring car driver Joachim Winkelhock. The resulting car was a lightweight M5 stripped of some amenities. The Winkelhock Edition features a smaller battery, the reduced US-spec 81-litre fuel tank, reduced sound deadening, and deletion of non-essential items such as rear headrests, vanity mirrors, rear window switches and foglights. The Recaro front seat design, suede-covered 385mm M-Technic II steering wheel, shift knob and parking brake handle, and red seatbelts were similar to those on the BMW E30 M3 Sport Evolution. A total of 51 Winkelhock E34 M5s were produced with the options of having Jet Black (code number 668) with contrasting lower body panels in Sterling Silver metallic paint (code number 244).

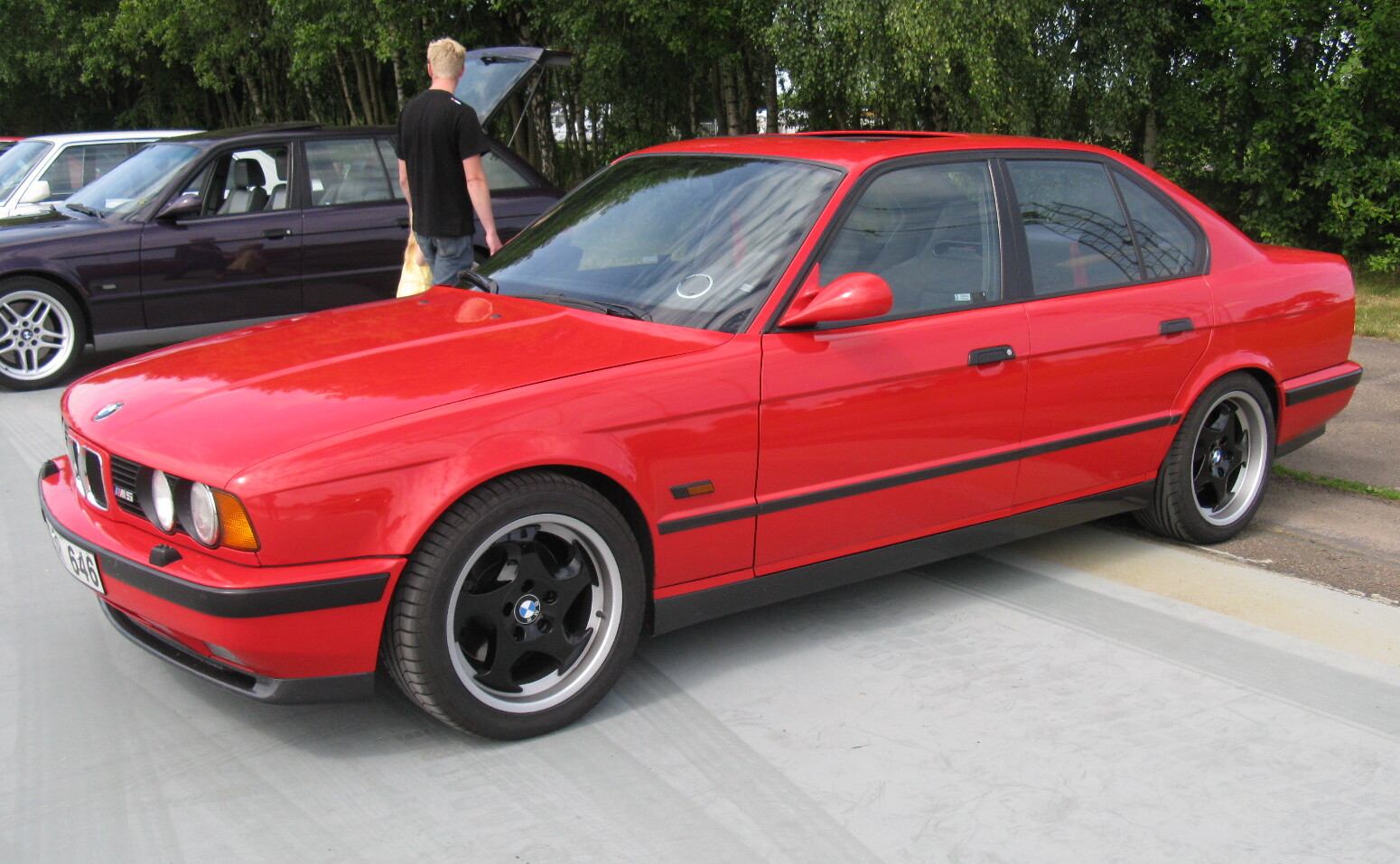
M5 20 Jahre Motorsport Edition

The 20 Jahre Motorsport Edition was built to celebrate BMW Motorsport's 20th anniversary in 1992. Twenty cars were produced, all Euro-spec 3.8-litre models. Offered only in Mugello Red (code number 274), the anniversary edition had a number of aesthetic trim upgrades such as carbon fiber dash panels, red seat belts embroidered with "BMW Motorsport," and M-Technic rear-view mirrors. Unique seat centre & door trim fabric were matched with Alcantara, which was also used on the steering wheel, shift lever & parking brake lever.

The UK Limited Edition was produced from March to June 1995, to commemorate the end of right-hand drive E34 M5 production. Fifty cars were produced, in one of two colour and trim combinations: Rosso Red metallic (code number 369) with a Champagne extended leather interior and natural poplar wood trim (15 built) or Orinoco metallic (code number 406) with a Bicolour Petrol and Mint extended leather interior and graphite bird's-eye maple wood trim (35 built). Each E34 M5 Limited Edition is equipped with the three-spoke sport steering wheel, Shadowline trim, power sunroof, power front seats, headlight washers and manual air conditioning. A numbered plaque appears on the centre console.

Additionally, 20 M5 Touring Elekta models were assembled for distribution in Italy in 1995. These were finished in either Sterling Silver over Marine Blue leather, or British Racing Green over Tobacco leather and featured extended leather interior as well as unique, numbered shift knobs. It is debated as to whether or not these cars constitute a true special edition as they were ordered directly by a group of Italian BMW dealers.

BMW developed a prototype convertible model, which featured an electric folding cloth roof and a steeper raked windshield than a standard M5. Steel reinforcements were added under both side valance panels to reduce body flex, and curb weight was approximately 100 kg (220 lb) more than the saloon model. The prototype was never given the green light for production due to financial considerations.

Following the manufacturer's announcement that they were opening a new factory in Greer, South Carolina, a BMW M5 built to highway patrol specification was presented to the South Carolina Highway Patrol (SCHP) in July 1992. The car, shipped from Tennessee after it was rejected by the Tennessee Highway Patrol, was also initially rejected by the South Carolina Highway Patrol, due to concerns about it being considered a luxury vehicle, before it was eventually accepted into SCHP on lease purchase. A second M5 was later delivered to SCHP, with one of the two stored in a SCHP museum after completing service.

=== Motorsport ===
BMW Australia entered an E34 M5 in the Australian 1992 Bathurst 12 Hour Production Car endurance race, placing 2nd overall, and 1st in its class. It was driven by former F1 grand prix champion Alan Jones, Neville Crichton, and BMW Touring car driver Tony Longhurst.

== E39 M5 (1998–2003) ==
BMW M5 (E39)
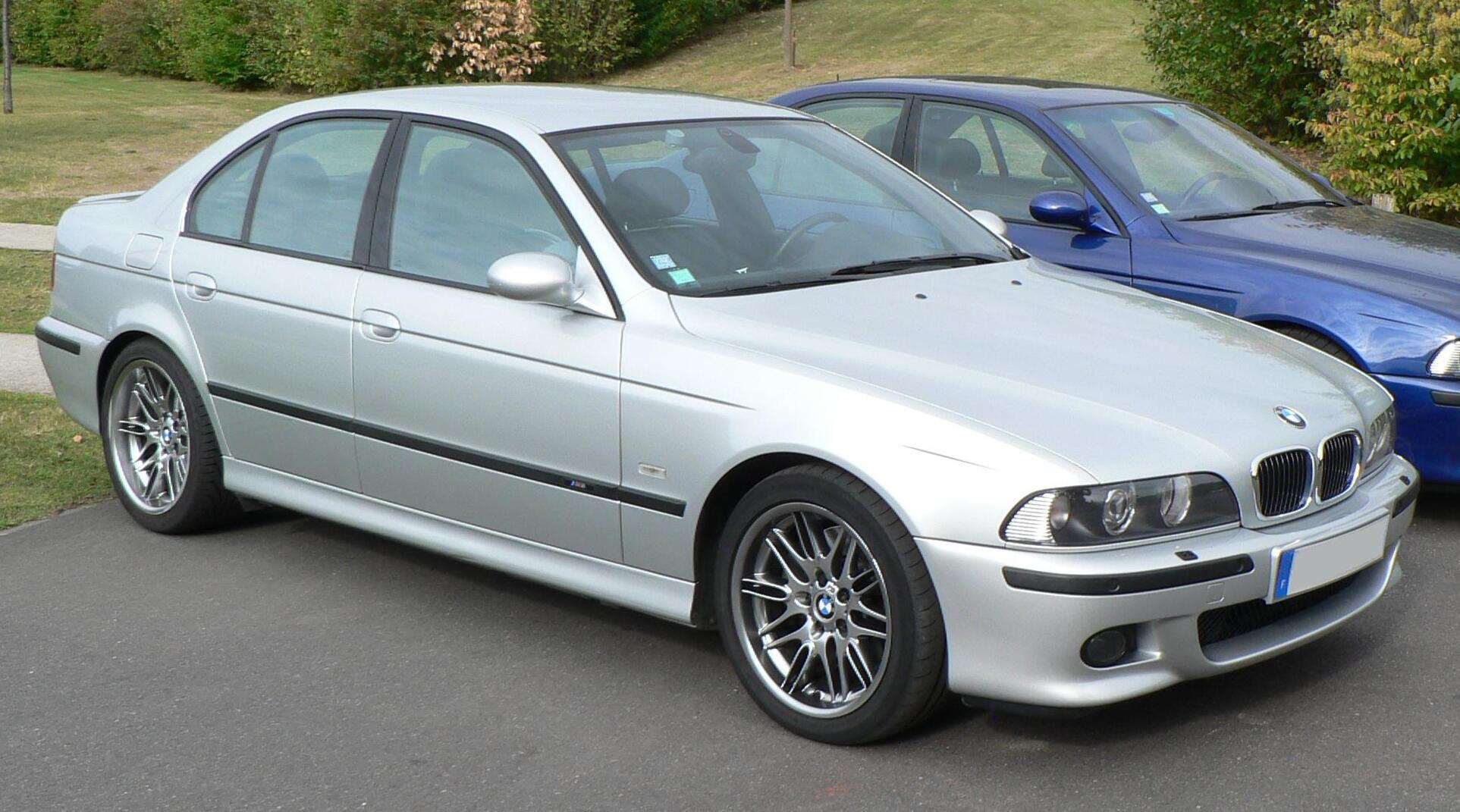

Overview
- Production: 1998–2003
- Designer: Ulf Weidhase

Body and chassis
- Body style: 4-door saloon
- Layout: Front-engine, rear-wheel-drive
- Related: BMW 5 Series (E39)

Powertrain
- Engine: 4.9 L S62 V8
- Transmission: 6-speed manual

Dimensions
- Wheelbase: 2,830 mm (111.4 in)
- Length: 4,783 mm (188.3 in)
- Width: 1,801 mm (70.9 in)
- Height: 1,412 mm (55.6 in)
- Curb weight: 1,795 kg (3,957 lb)

Introduced in 1998 at the Geneva Motor Show, the E39 generation of the M5 was the first M5 to use a V8 engine, resulting in an increase in power output to 294 kW (400 PS). It was also the first M5 to use aluminium front suspension components and a multi-link rear suspension. Production began in October 1998.

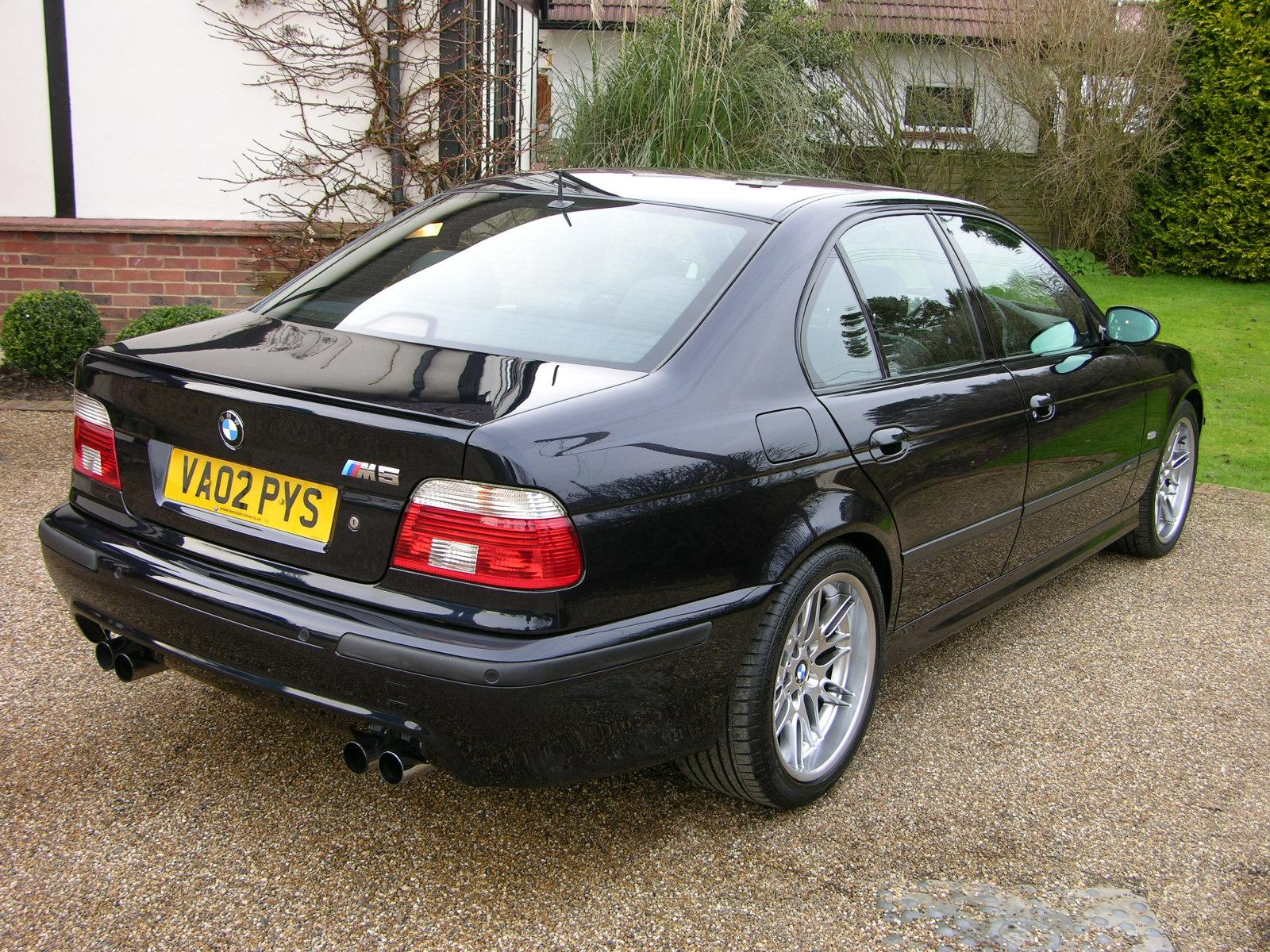
Rear 3/4 view

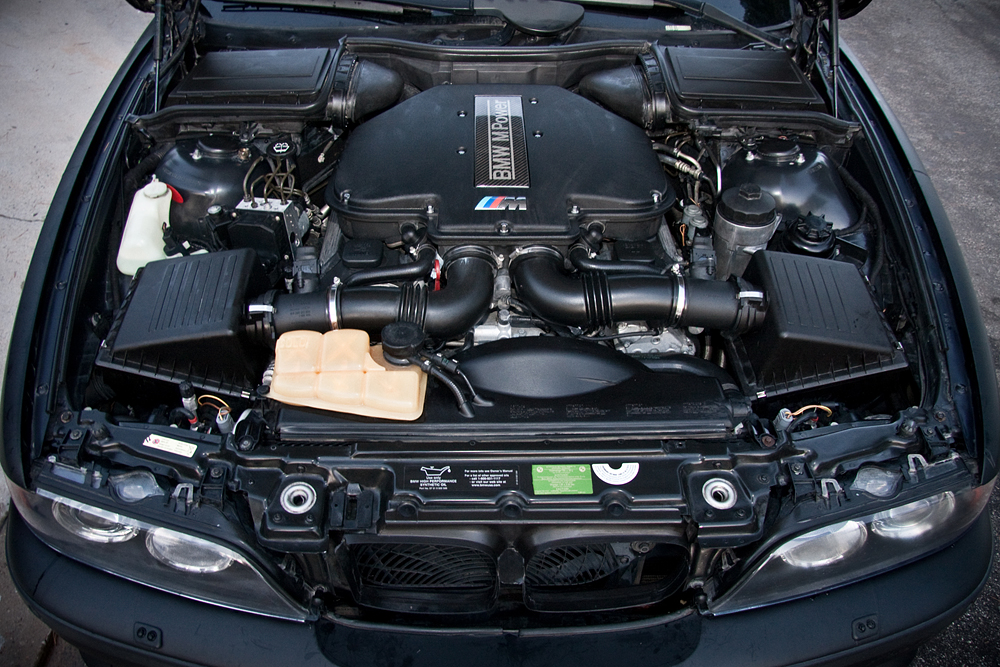
BMW S62 V8 engine

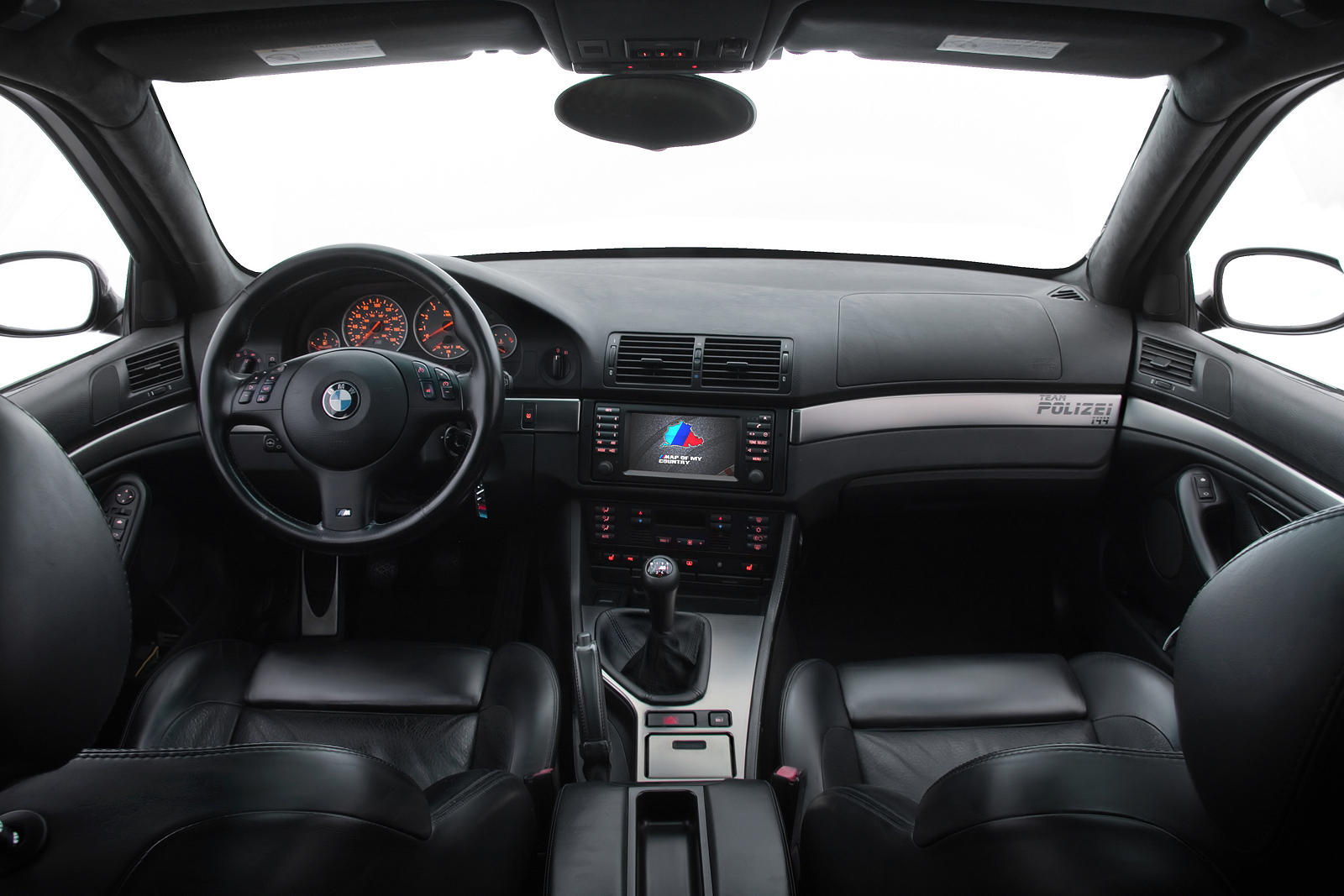
BMW M5 E39 Interior

Production totalled to 20,482 cars from 1999 to 2003. Unlike its predecessors, the M5 was produced on the same assembly line as the regular 5 Series models at the Dingolfing factory in Germany.

The official performance figures are a 0–97 km/h (60 mph) acceleration time of 4.8 seconds and an electronically limited top speed of 250 km/h (155 mph). In testing, an unrestricted M5 reached a top speed in excess of 300 km/h (186 mph). The E39 M5 recorded a Nürburgring lap time of 8:20.

The M5 received the September 2000 facelift (for the 2001 model year) at the same time as the standard E39 models. Changes included halogen "corona rings" in headlights (often called "Angel Eyes"), LED tail-lights and various interior upgrades. The mechanical specification was unchanged. For the subsequent two model years, changes were limited to the addition of new exterior colours (from September 2001) and the upgrade to a DVD-based navigation system (from September 2002).

Production of a "Touring" (estate/wagon) E39 M5 model was evaluated by BMW, and at least one prototype was developed (in Titanium Silver with a Black Exclusive leather interior). However, the Touring did not reach production, due to financial considerations.

=== Engine ===
The E39 M5 is powered by the BMW S62 V8 engine, which generates a power output of 294 kW (400 PS; 394 hp) at 6,600 rpm and 500 N⋅m (369 lb⋅ft) of torque at 3,800 rpm. The S62 engine has electronically actuated individual throttle bodies, an aluminium block and heads, variable valve timing (double-VANOS), and a semi-dry sump oil system.

=== Drivetrain ===
The transmission is the Getrag 420G six-speed manual, as used in the E39 540i, but with an upgraded clutch due to the increased torque. The differential uses a shorter 3.15:1 ratio, and it has a limited-slip differential with 25% maximum locking.

=== Chassis ===
The E39 M5 uses aluminium-intensive MacPherson strut front suspension and multi-link rear suspension, like the other V8 models of the E39 5 Series range. However, several changes were made by BMW M. Reduced spring height, 23 mm (0.9 in) lower. A specific shock valving, thicker front and rear anti-roll bars, polyurethane auxiliary springs, and steel balljoints.

Although the six-cylinder E39 models use rack-and-pinion steering, the M5 (and other V8 models) retains the recirculating ball steering system, as used by previous generations of the M5. A quicker steering ratio of 14.7 was used, compared with 17.9 for other V8 models. It featured a Servotronic vehicle-speed-sensitive power assist which provides two levels of resistance controlled via console mounted Sport button. The Sport button also adjusted the electronic throttle butterflies for more sensitive response.

Brake discs (rotors) are a "floating" two-piece design (except for U.S. and Canada models), for reduced risk of cone distortion. Their lower unsprung weight improves ride quality and traction on bumpy surfaces as well. The front discs are 345 mm (13.58 in) in diameter and the rear discs are 328 mm (12.91 in) in diameter.

== E60/E61 M5 (2004–2010) ==
BMW M5 (E60/E61)
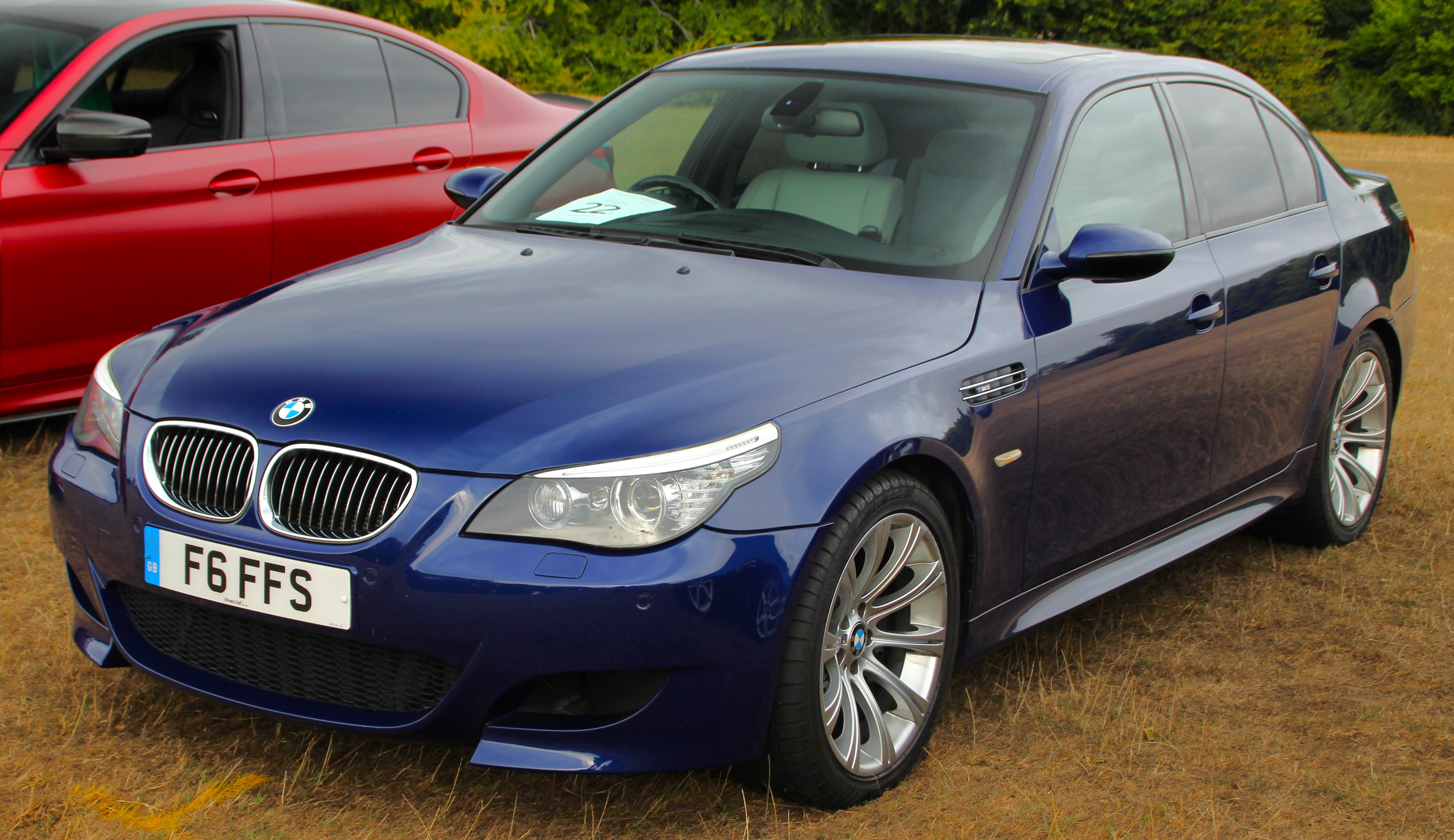

Overview
- Production: 2004–2010
- Model years: 2005–2010
- Designer: Karl Elmitt

Body and chassis
- Body style: 4-door saloon (E60); 5-door estate (E61)
- Layout: Front-engine, rear-wheel-drive
- Related: BMW 5 Series (E60)

Powertrain
- Engine: 5.0 L S85 Uneven firing 90° V10
- Transmission: 7-speed SMG-III; 6-speed manual (North America only)

Dimensions
- Wheelbase: 2,890 mm (113.8 in)
- Length: 4,855–4,864 mm (191.1–191.5 in)
- Width: 1,846 mm (72.7 in)
- Height: Sedan: 1,469 mm (57.8 in); Wagon: 1,512 mm (59.5 in)
- Curb weight: 1,855–1,955 kg (4,090–4,310 lb)

The E60 M5 was introduced in 2004, with a V10 engine and 7-speed paddle-shift SMG (Sequential Manual Gearbox) transmission linking the car with the BMW Sauber Formula One program. The E60 M5 was the world's first production saloon to use a V10 petrol engine. This generation of the M5 was also built in the E61 Touring (estate) body style, which was only sold in Europe. The E63/E64 M6 coupé and convertible are based on a shortened version of the M5 chassis and largely use the same mechanical components.

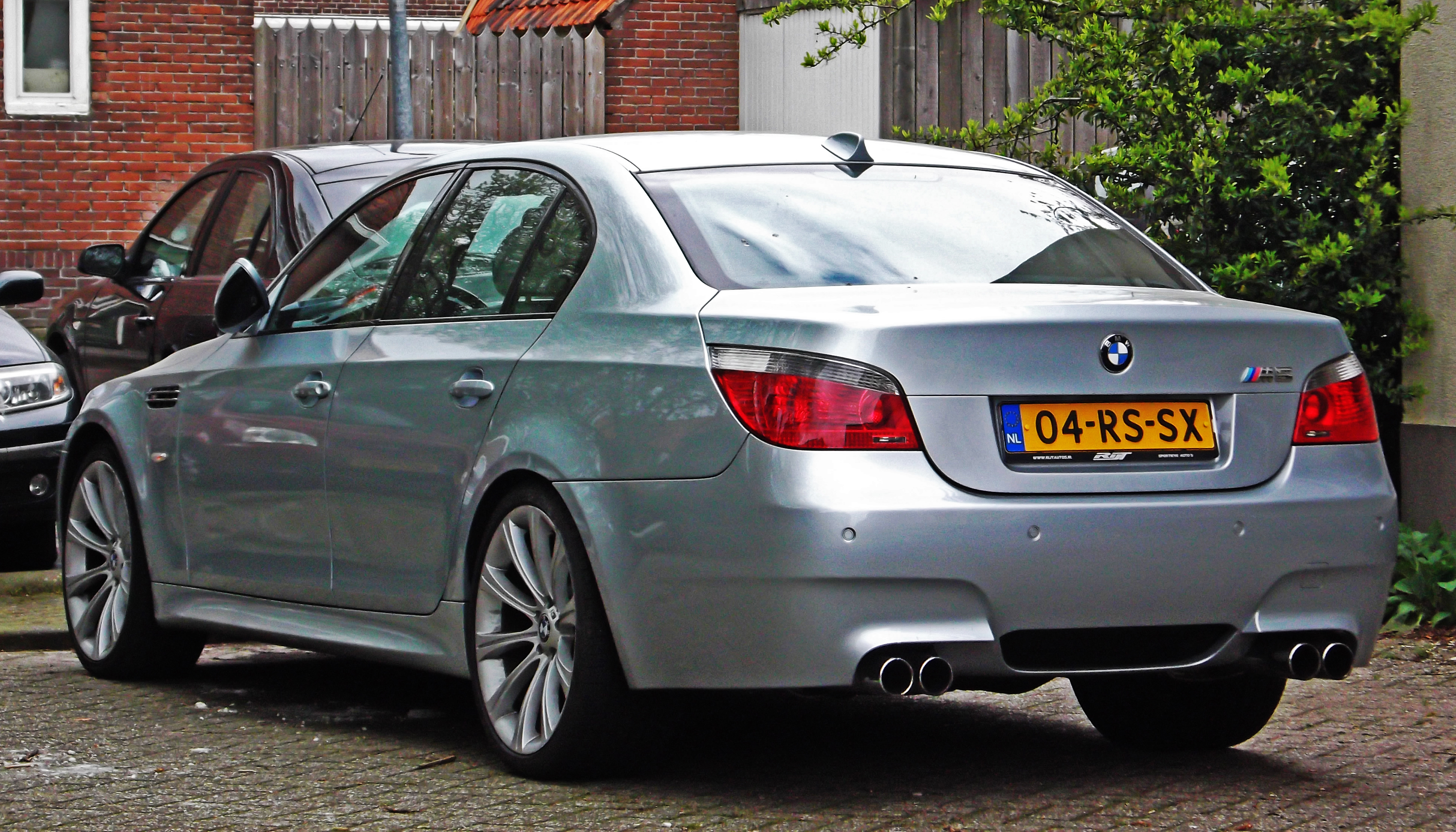
Sedan (pre-facelift)

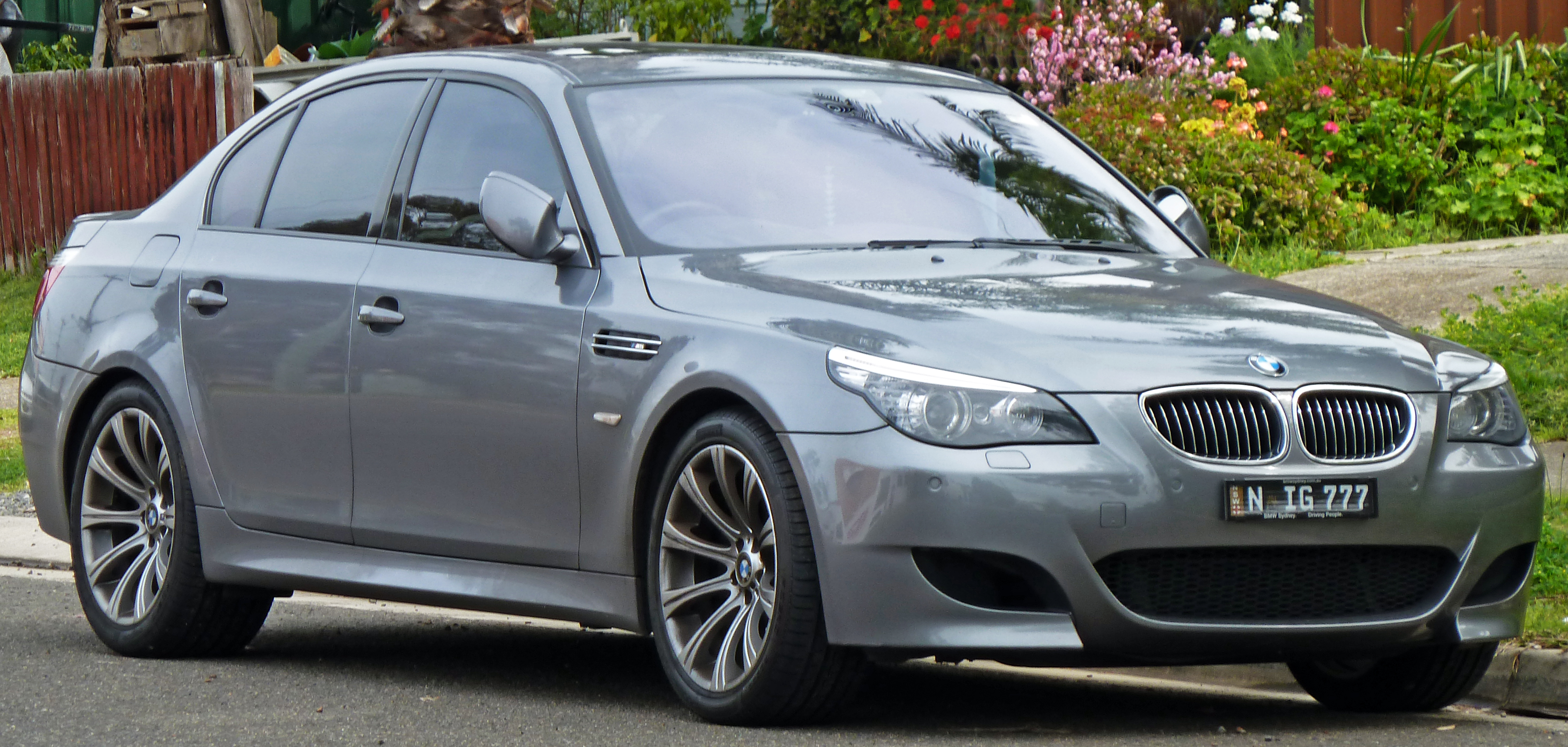

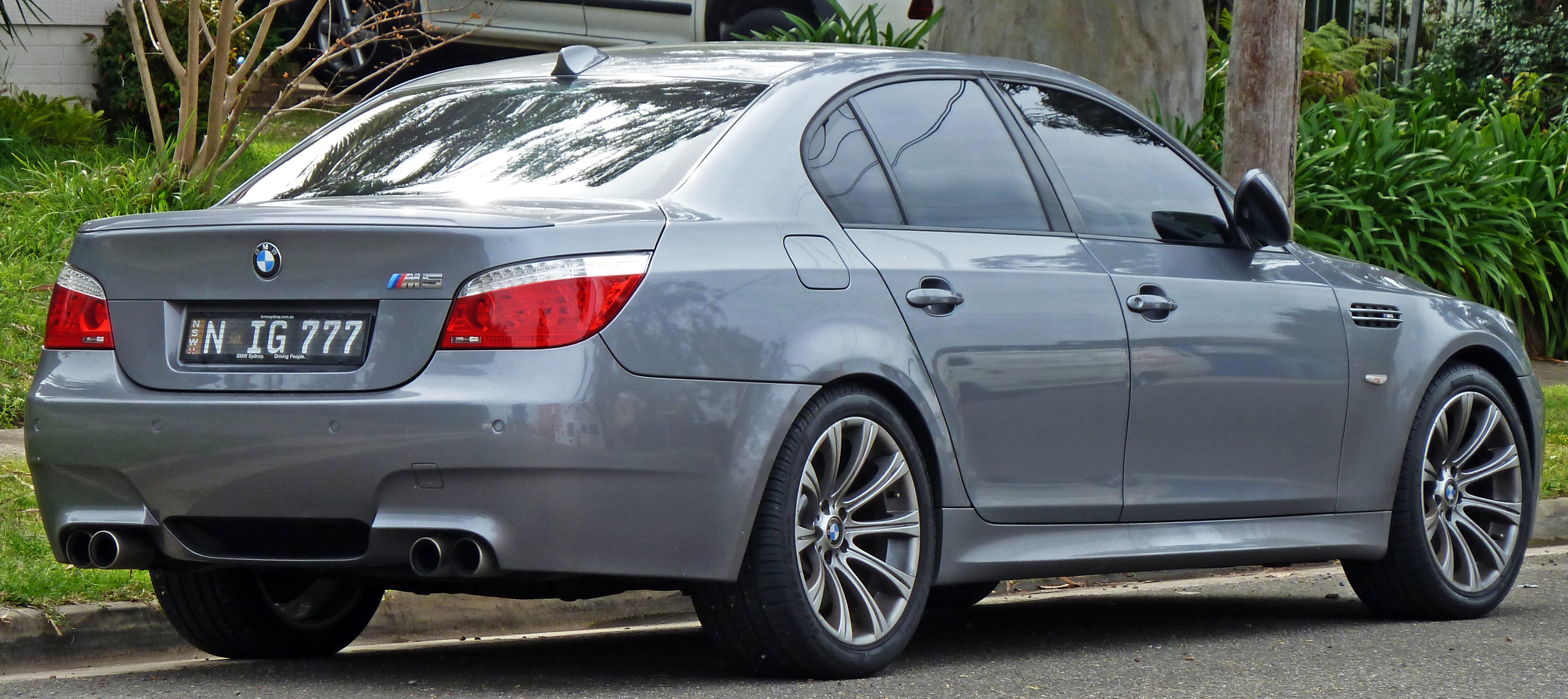
Sedan (facelift)

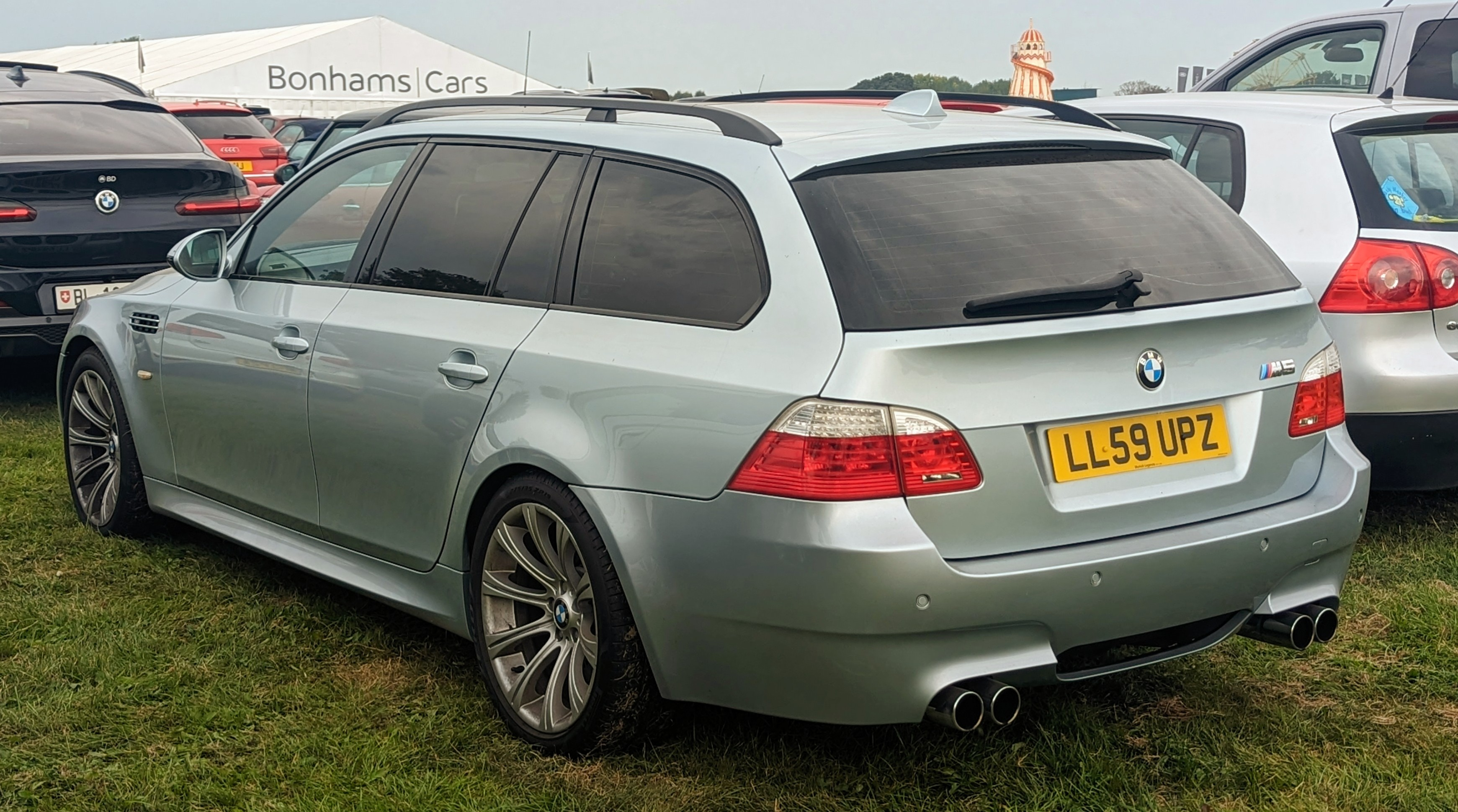
Wagon/Estate

The official 0 to 100 km/h (62 mph) acceleration figure is 4.7 seconds for the saloon, however magazine tests have recorded figures as low as 4.1 seconds. The E60 M5 was the fastest 4-door saloon available at the time of its introduction; top speed is electronically restricted to 250 km/h (155 mph) but could be raised to 305 km/h (190 mph) with the optional M-driver's package. The M5 has recorded a Nürburgring lap time of 8:13.

Upgrades over regular 5 Series models include a wider track, unique body panels, a colourful heads up display featuring navigation, control messages, speed, rpm and gear selection information, automated seat side bolsters, heated/ventilated seats and power rear curtain. The larger, flared front guards on either side also featured cooling vents, reminiscent of the 1970s BMW CSL. The wheels were of 19-inch diameter and the car has quad exhaust pipes at the rear.

During its five-year production run, 20,589 units were built: 19,564 saloons and 1,025 Touring/estates. The biggest market was the United States with 8,800 cars (saloons only), followed by the United Kingdom and Ireland with 1,776 cars and Germany with 1,647 cars.

The M5 model was designed by Karl John Elmitt and produced at the BMW Plant Dingolfing in Germany. The E60 M5 did not offer safety features such as automatic radar braking or lane departure warning; while these features were offered on the E60 5 Series, they were not available on the M5.

=== Engine ===
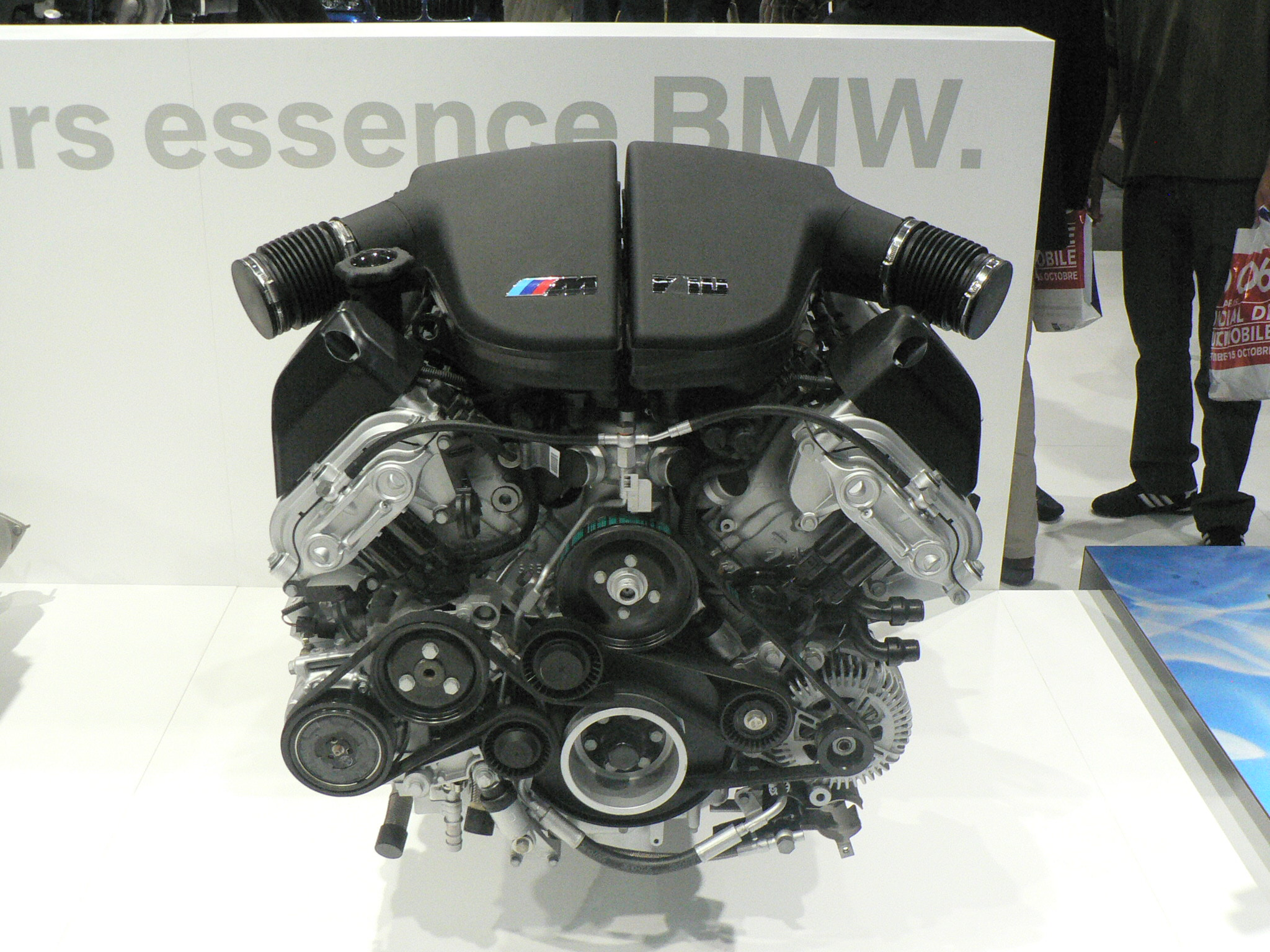
BMW S85 V10 engine

The BMW S85 is a 5.0 L (305 cu in) V10 engine which generates a power output of 373 kW (507 PS; 500 hp) at 7,750 rpm and 520 N⋅m (384 lb⋅ft) of torque at 6,100 rpm. The S85 was exclusively used in the E60 M5 (and related E63/E64 M6) and is not based on any other engine.

There are three driver-selectable engine modes: P400, P500 and P500 S. P400, the default start-up mode, limits the engine to 294 kW (400 PS; 394 hp). P500 increases power to the full 373 kW (507 PS; 500 hp). The P500 S mode keeps the engine at the same power output as the P500 mode but adds a more sensitive throttle response.

This engine is well known for its rod bearing failures, the stock bearings not providing sufficient clearance (the S65 from the E9X series M3, being based on the S85, shares the issue), which can lead to catastrophic engine failure if it is not addressed. Another major issue with this engine is the throttle actuators, which is usually attributed to the gears located inside the actuators, however, electronic failure of the actuators themselves is not uncommon.

=== Transmission ===
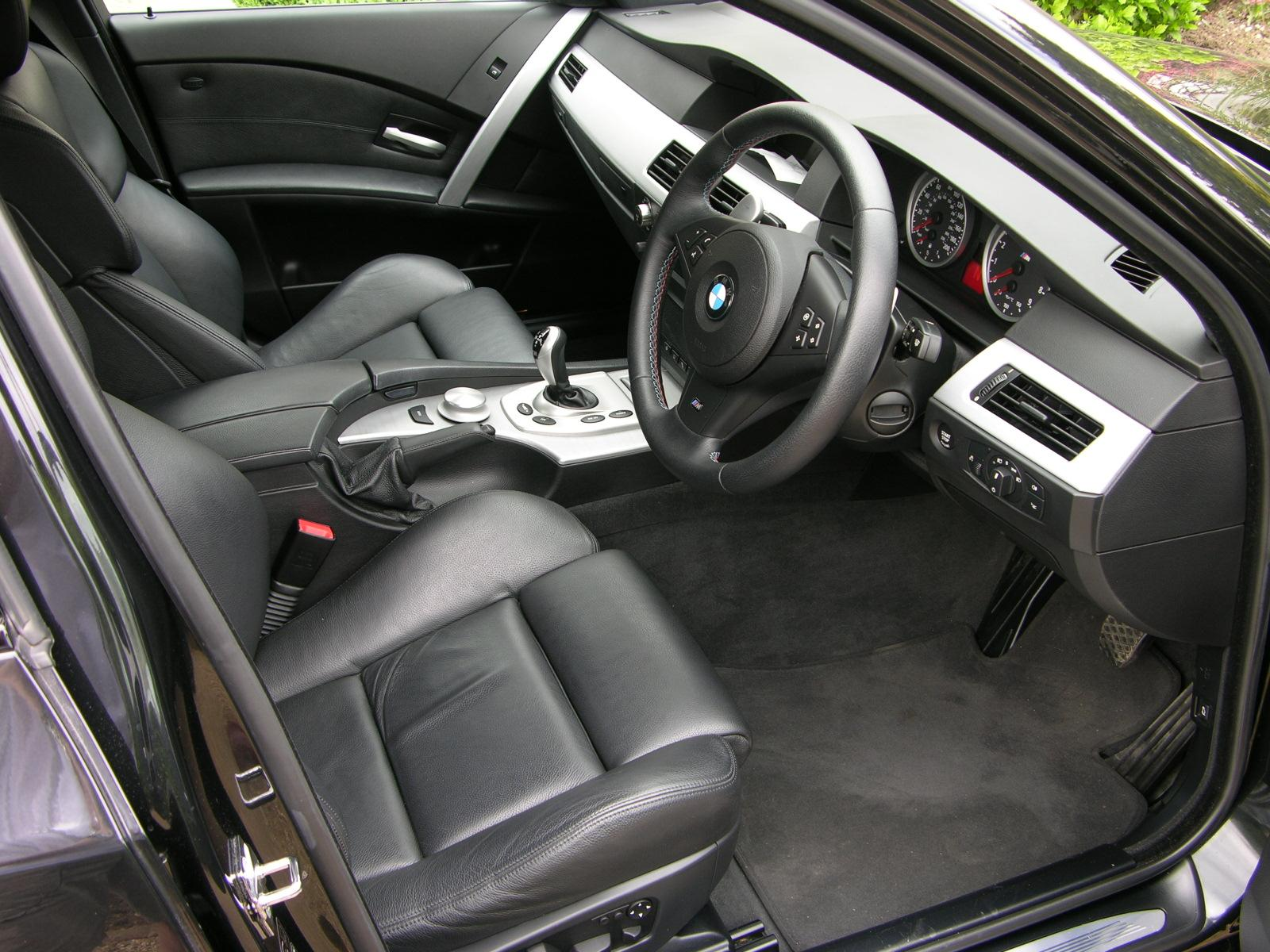
2006 M5 interior (SMG)

The M5 uses the SMG-III 7-speed single-clutch automated manual transmission, that performs gear shifts in 65–250 milliseconds, depending on the gear shifting mode.

- The SMG-III includes launch control, a hill holder, shift-lock avoidance (by briefly disengaging the clutch during downshifts) and an automatic shift mode. However, many reviews have observed the automatic mode of the transmission at low or frequent stop start speeds as being less smooth than that of a conventional automatic transmission.

In North America, a conventional six-speed manual transmission was announced in October 2006. The SMG-III remained the default transmission in North America, while the manual was available as a no cost option. The six-speed manual M5 was marginally slower in certain tests, as the dynamic stability control could not be disengaged unlike the SMG version (however this was later made possible and a retrofit was released for earlier cars). In North America, the launch control for SMG transmissions is set at 1,500 rpm, instead of the 4,000 rpm used in other regions. A total of 1,366 North American market cars were produced with manual transmission, making the take rate about 14%.

== F10 M5 (2011–2016) ==
BMW M5 (F10)
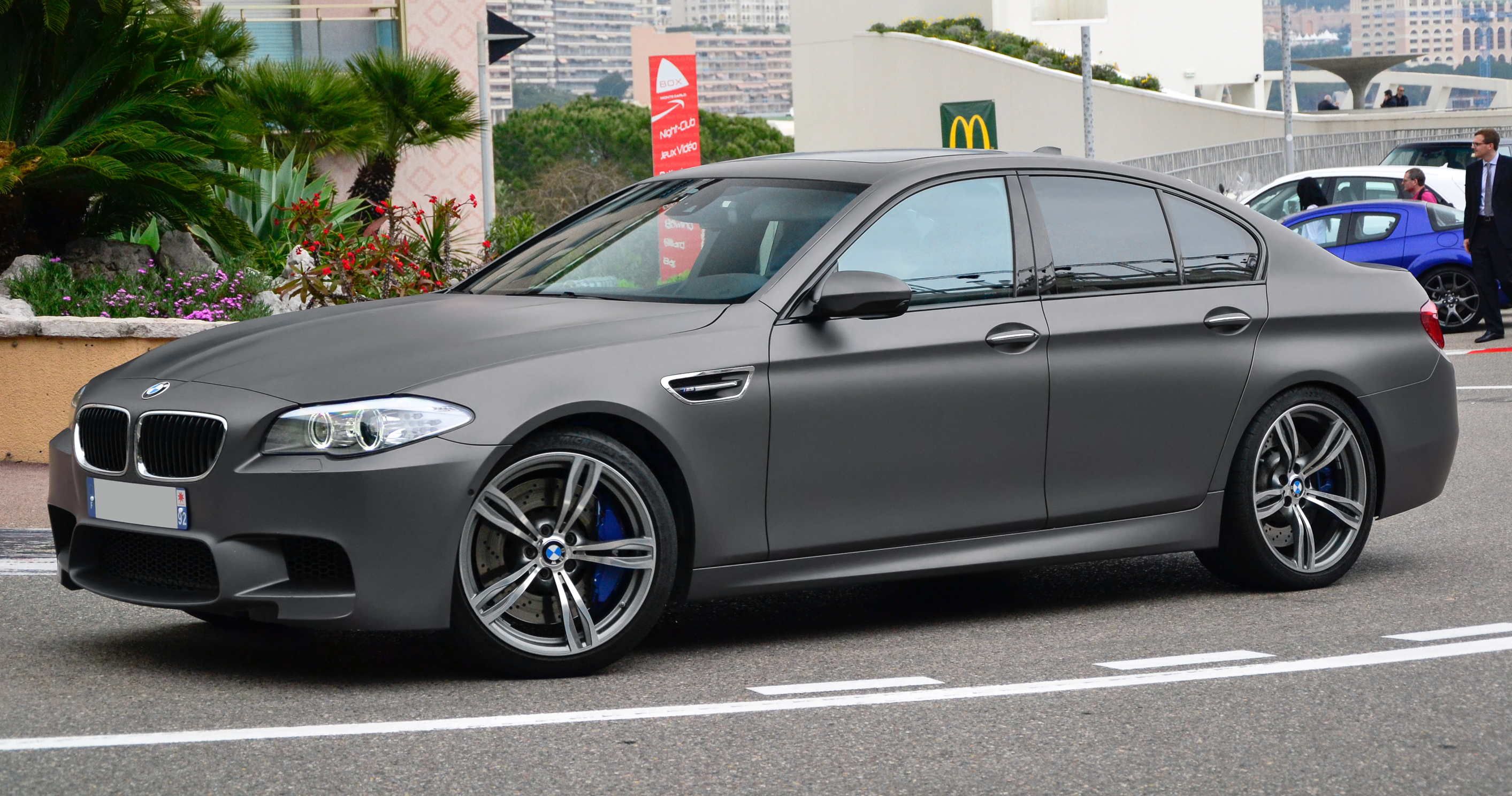

Overview
- Production: 2011–2016
- Model years: 2012–2016
- Designer: Ulf Weidhase, Jacek Fröhlich

Body and chassis
- Body style: 4-door saloon
- Layout: Front-engine, rear-wheel-drive
- Related: BMW 5 Series (F10)

Powertrain
- Engine: 4.4 L S63 twin-turbo V8
- Transmission: 7-speed dual-clutch; 6-speed manual (US and Canada only)

Dimensions
- Wheelbase: 2,970 mm (116.9 in)
- Length: 4,910 mm (193.3 in)
- Width: 1,891 mm (74.4 in)
- Height: 1,451 mm (57.1 in)
- Curb weight: 1,990 kg (4,387 lb)

The F10 M5 was unveiled at the 2011 Frankfurt Motor Show and sales began in November 2011. It is powered by a twin-turbocharged V8 engine, making it the first turbocharged M5 model. The gearbox in most markets is a 7-speed Getrag 7DCI600 dual-clutch transmission marking the first time an M5 has used a dual-clutch automatic transmission. A traditional 6-speed manual transmission was also available in the United States and Canada.

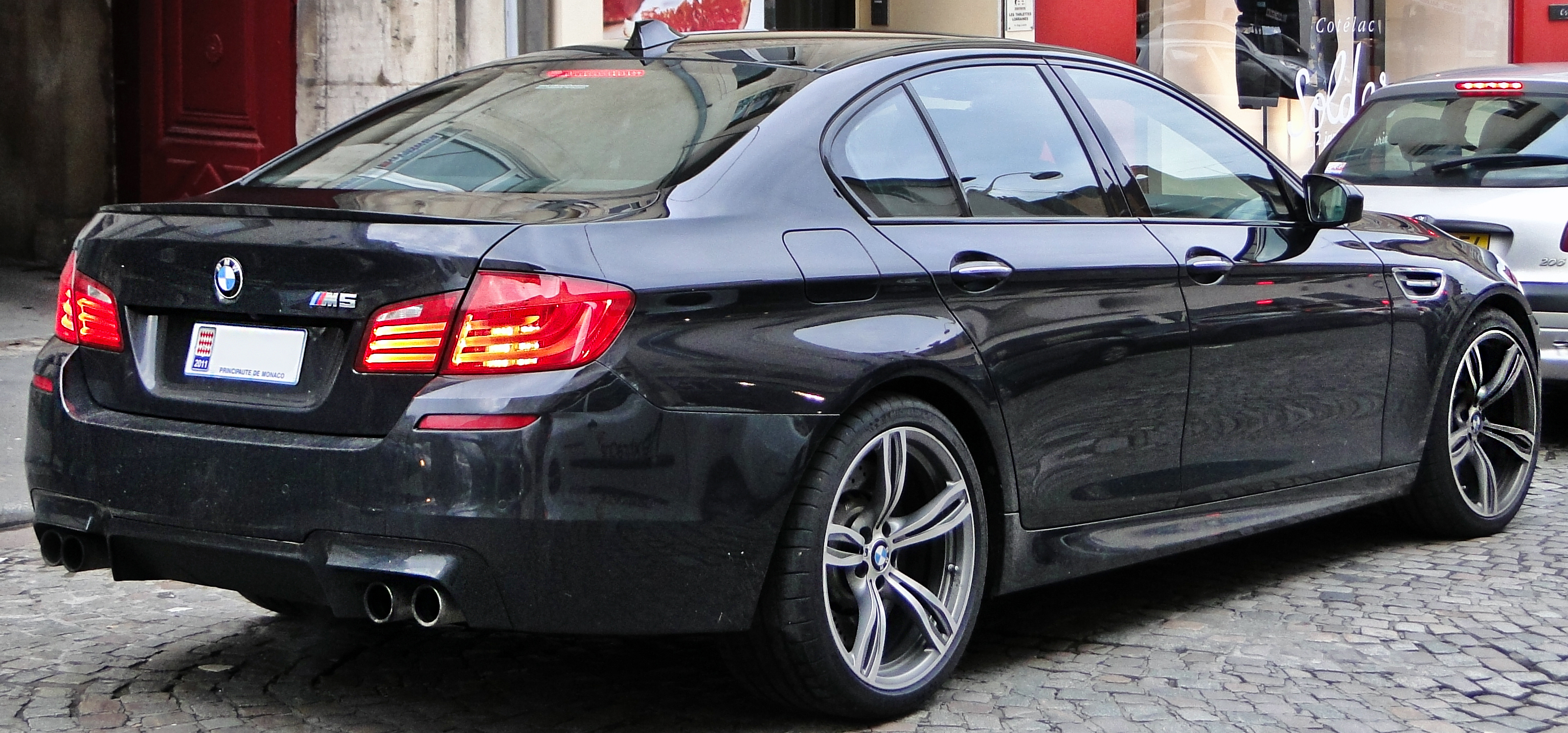
Rear view

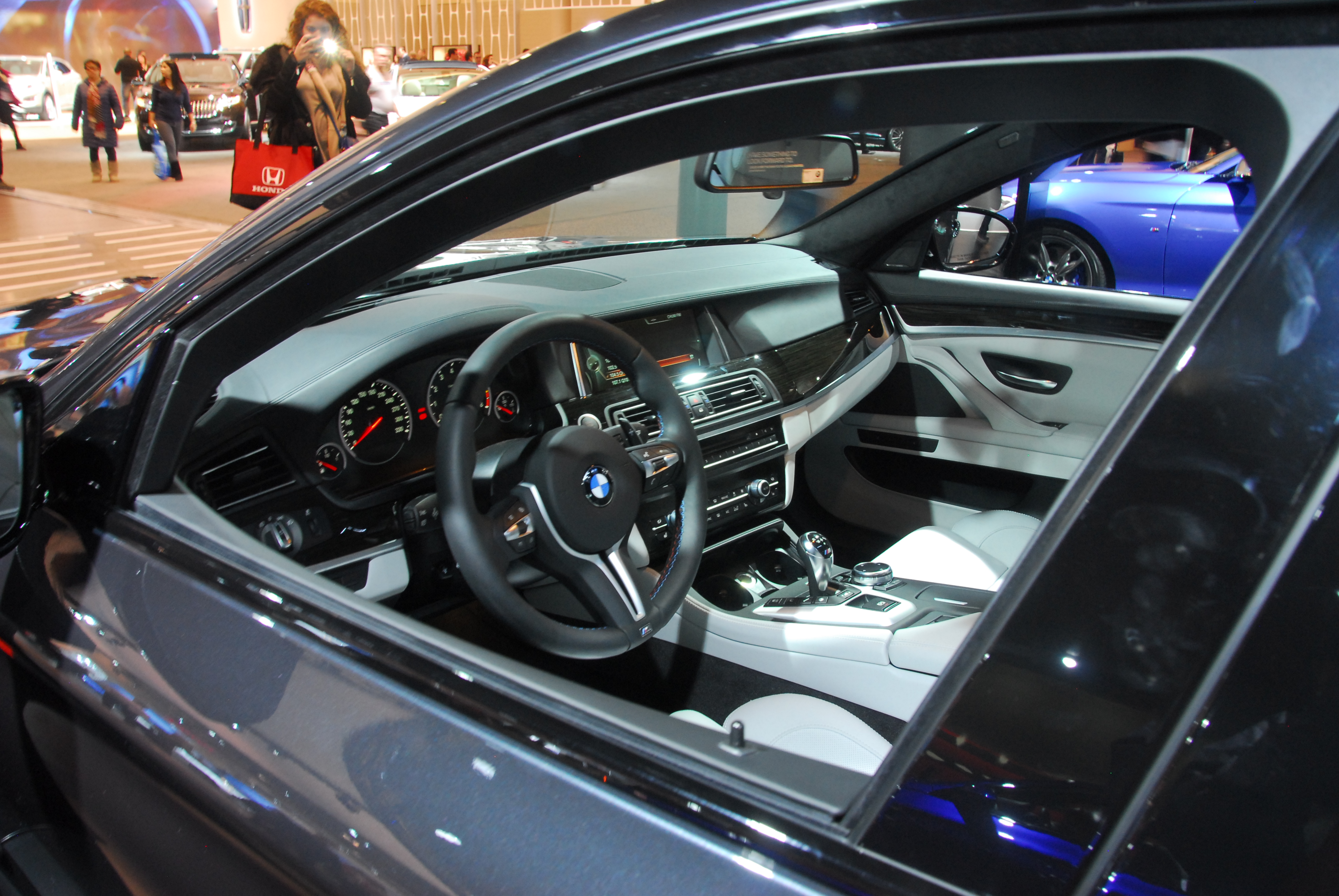
Interior

The S63B44TU engine is an upgraded version of the 4.4 L (269 cu in) twin-turbocharged V8 first introduced in the 2010 E70 X5 M, generating a maximum power output of 412 kW (560 PS; 553 hp) at 6,000–7,000 rpm and 680 N⋅m (502 lb⋅ft) at 1,500–5,750 rpm. This results in an official 0 to 100 km/h (62 mph) acceleration time of 4.4 seconds and top speed (with the optional M Driver's Package fitted) of 305 km/h (190 mph). The F10 M5 has a reported Nürburgring lap time of 7:55.

An Active M-Differential provides torque vectoring between the rear wheels, which are 19-inches in standard trim. Optional 20-inch wheels are fitted with 265/35/20 front and 295/30/20 rear Michelin Pilot Super Sport tyres. Standard brakes are 6-piston front calipers with carbon ceramic brakes optional. The F10 M5 weighs 1,945 kg (4,288 lb), which is 90 kg (198 lb) more than its predecessor. The F10 M5 was praised for its improved gearbox and fuel economy; however, the engine sound, steering feel and increased weight were criticised.

The M5 was produced alongside regular 5 Series models at the BMW Dingolfing Plant in Germany. Production ended in October 2016. In total, 19,533 cars were produced, of which 8,088 were produced for North American market, 6,281 for other LHD markets, and 5,164 in right-hand drive. 577 North American market cars came with manual transmission, making the take rate 7%.

In 2014, the M5 Competition Package was introduced. The Competition Package increases peak engine power to 423 kW (575 PS; 567 hp) and has a revised suspension setup (bushings, springs, dampers, anti-roll bars) which lowers the car 10 mm (0.4 in). In 2015, the power output of the M5's Competition Package was raised to 441 kW (600 PS; 591 hp) and 700 N⋅m (516 lb⋅ft).

=== M Performance Parts ===
M Performance Parts include an M Performance exhaust, a carbon fibre spoiler, a sport steering wheel, sport pedals, side skirts, a diffuser and carbon fibre mirrors.

=== Special editions ===
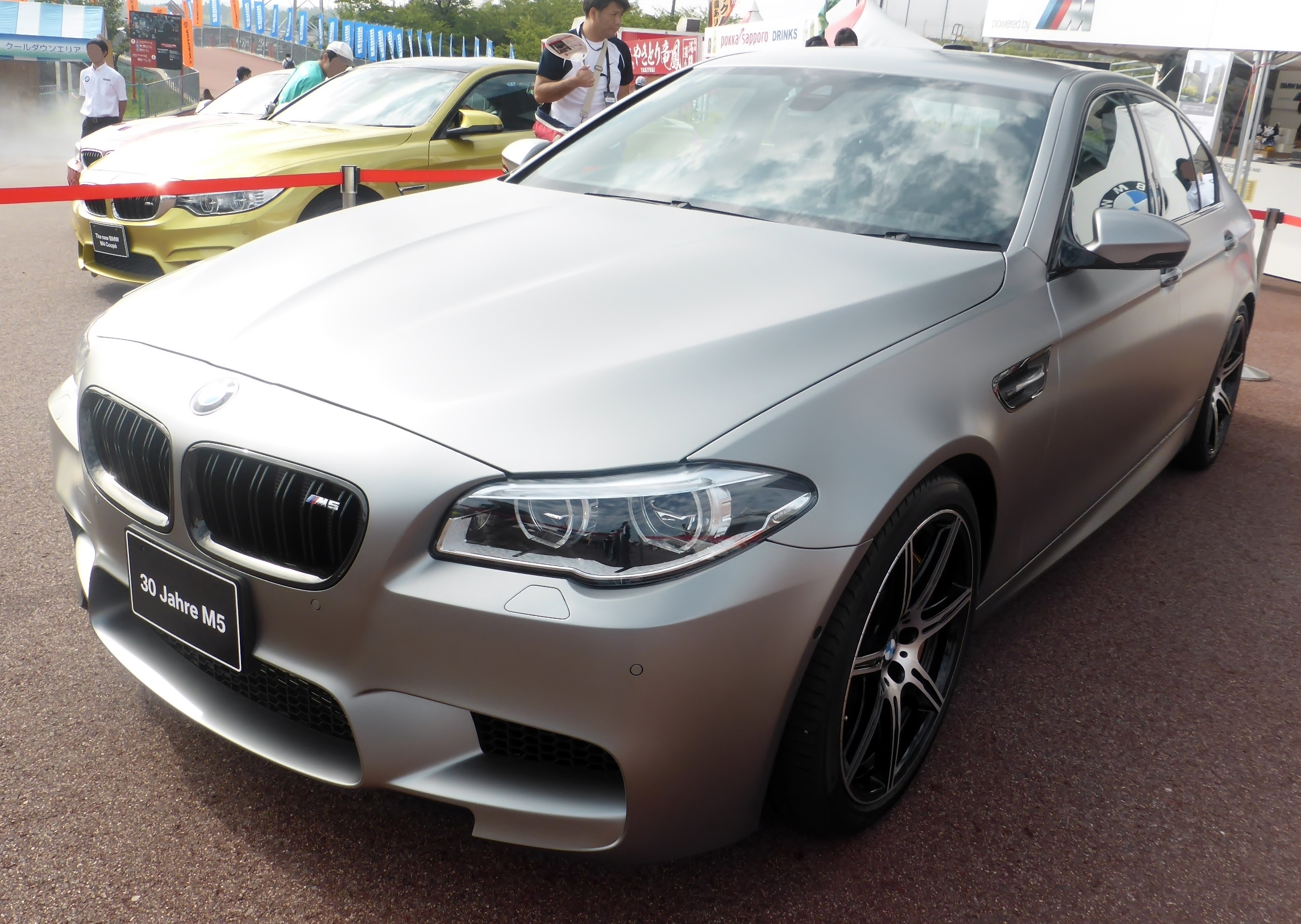
30 Jahre M5 (F10)

To celebrate the M5's 30th anniversary in 2015, BMW built 300 special edition models, named "30 Jahre BMW M5". All 300 cars came in BMW special edition paint in the Individual colour shade called Frozen Dark Silver metallic. On the interior, "30 Jahre M5" is embroidered on the front door sill finishers and the seat backrests, and a plaque bearing "30 Jahre M5" and "1/300" inscriptions is placed on the dashboard.

Instead of this special edition, US and South African buyers received the very similar M5 Pure Metal Silver Edition. Becoming available in July 2016, it was painted a multi-layered, highly reflective Pure Metal Silver Metallic colour and was given various sorts of extra trim and a sportier suspension. Production was limited to 50 examples in the United States and 20 examples for South Africa. Power increased somewhat, to 441 kW (600 PS; 591 hp) at 6,250 rpm with torque up to 700 N⋅m (516 lb⋅ft), thanks to a slight increase in boost. Thanks to the M5 Competition Pack ("M Drivers Package" in the US), the top speed was increased to 305 km/h (190 mph).

== F90 M5 (2017–2023) ==
BMW M5 (F90)
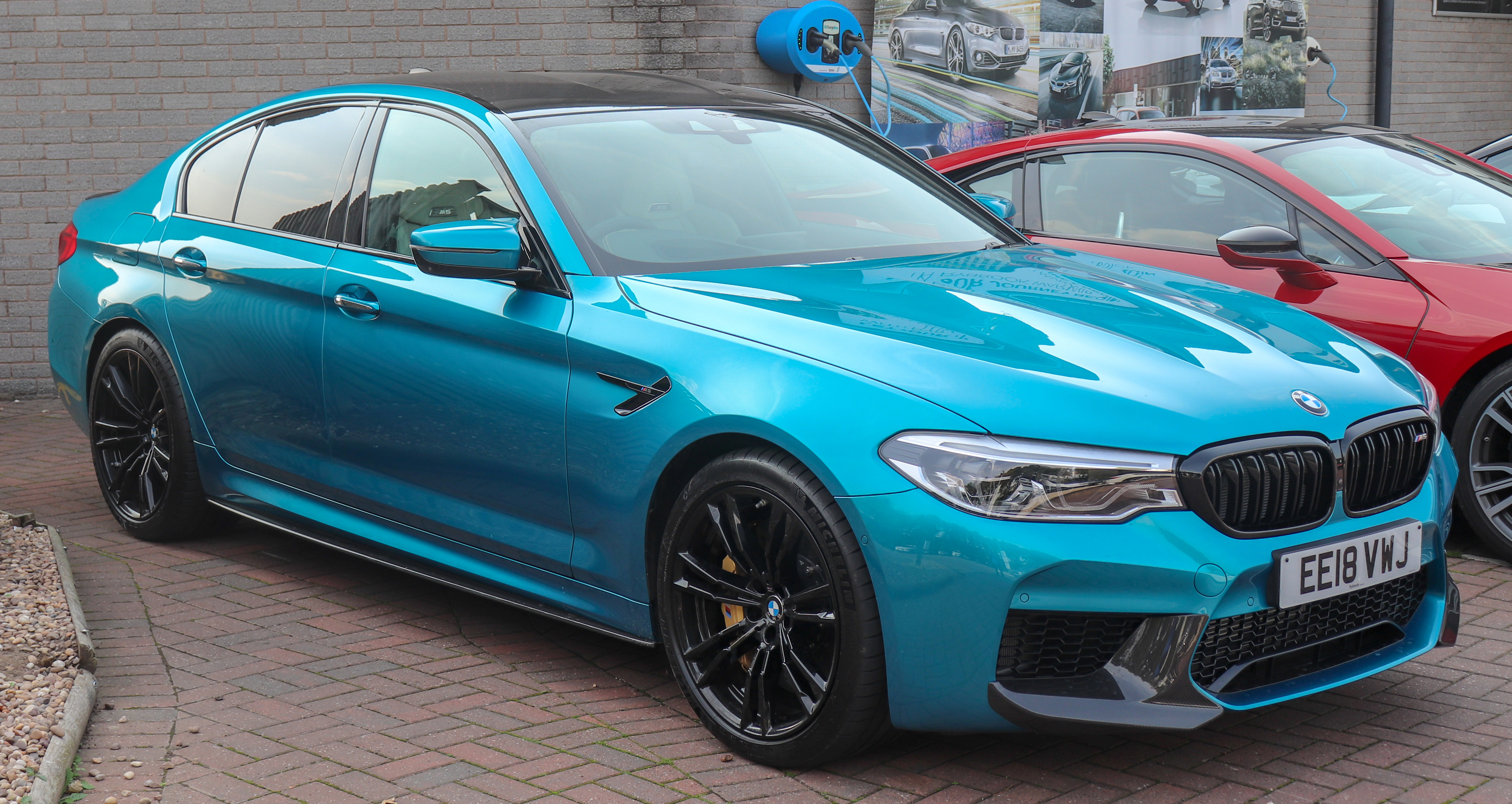

Overview
- Production: 2017–2023
- Model years: 2018–2023
- Designer: Seungmo Lim

Body and chassis
- Body style: 4-door saloon
- Layout: Front-engine, all-wheel-drive
- Platform: Cluster Architecture (CLAR)
- Related: BMW 5 Series (G30)

Powertrain
- Engine: 4.4 L S63 twin-turbo V8
- Transmission: 8-speed ZF GA8HP75Z Steptronic automatic

Dimensions
- Wheelbase: 2,982 mm (117.4 in)
- Length: 4,965 mm (195.47 in)
- Width: 1,903 mm (74.92 in)
- Height: 1,473 mm (57.99 in)
- Curb weight: 1,982 kg (4,370 lb)

The F90 M5 is based on the G30 5 Series and uses an all-wheel drive ("xDrive") powertrain, being the first time that an M5 has not been rear-wheel drive. However the all-wheel drive system is biased towards the rear wheels. It can also be configured to send power to the rear wheels only, if the electronic stability control (ESC) is disabled. The transmission is an 8-speed ZF GA8HP75Z automatic.

The exterior of the M5 was designed by Seungmo Lim. The car was unveiled at the Gamescom in August 2017, to promote the launch of Need for Speed Payback. The M5 was also shown at the Frankfurt Motor Show (IAA) in September 2017. The M5 is produced alongside regular 5 Series models at the BMW Dingolfing Plant in Germany.

The F90 M5 accelerates from a standstill to 100 km/h (62 mph) in 3.4 seconds, and to 200 km/h (124 mph) in 11.1 seconds. In imperial measurements 60 mph (97 km/h) is reached in 2.8 seconds and 100 mph (161 km/h) in 6.6 seconds. The standing 400m (quarter mile) is achieved in 10.9 seconds, making this iteration of the M5 a 10-second car. The top speed is limited to 250 km/h (155 mph), or 305 km/h (190 mph) with the optional M Driver's Pack. Despite the added weight of the all-wheel drive components, the F90 M5 is 40 kg (88 lb) lighter than the previous generation M5.

In December 2017, the F90 M5 set the Guinness World Record for "Longest continuous vehicle drift" and "Longest twin vehicle drift (water assisted)" on a wet skidpad, with distances of 374 and 79 km (232 and 49 mi) respectively. The F90 M5 recorded a Nürburgring lap time of 7:38.92 in a test by sport auto.

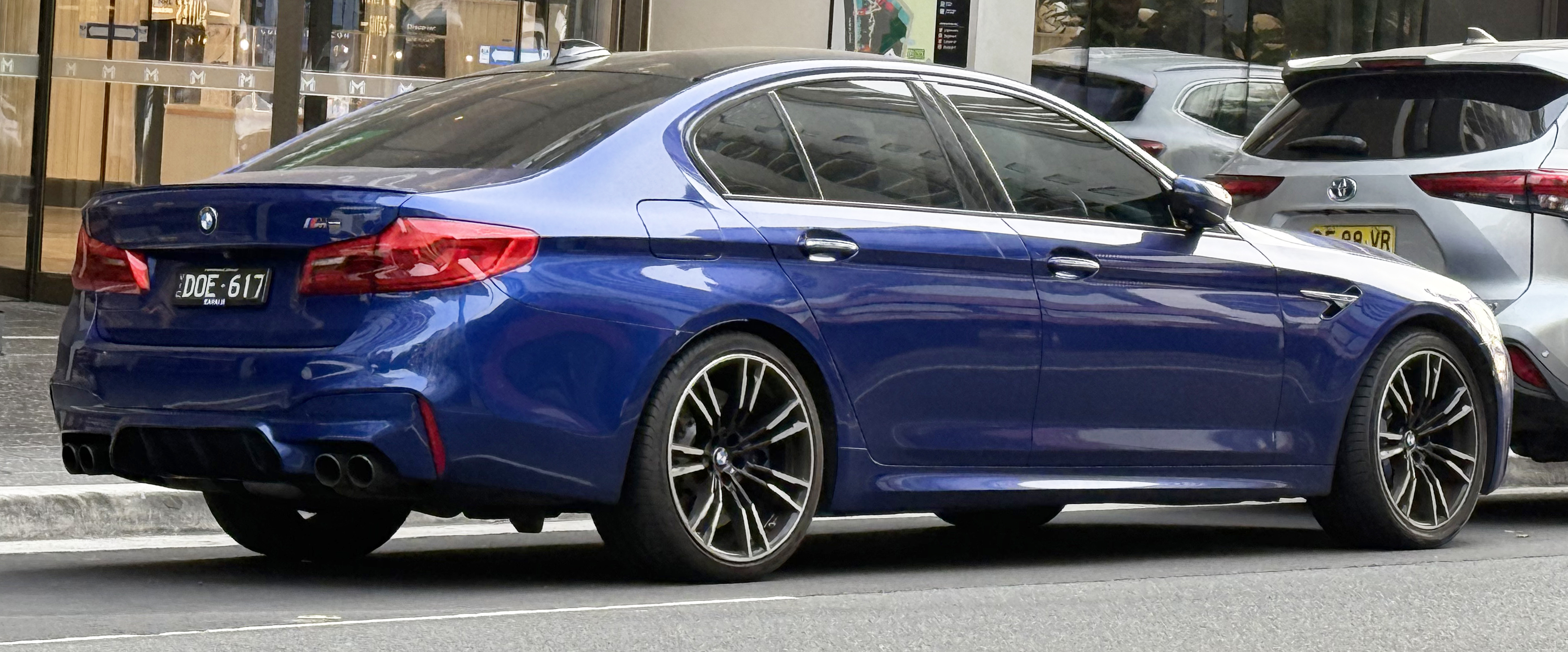
BMW M5 (Australia)

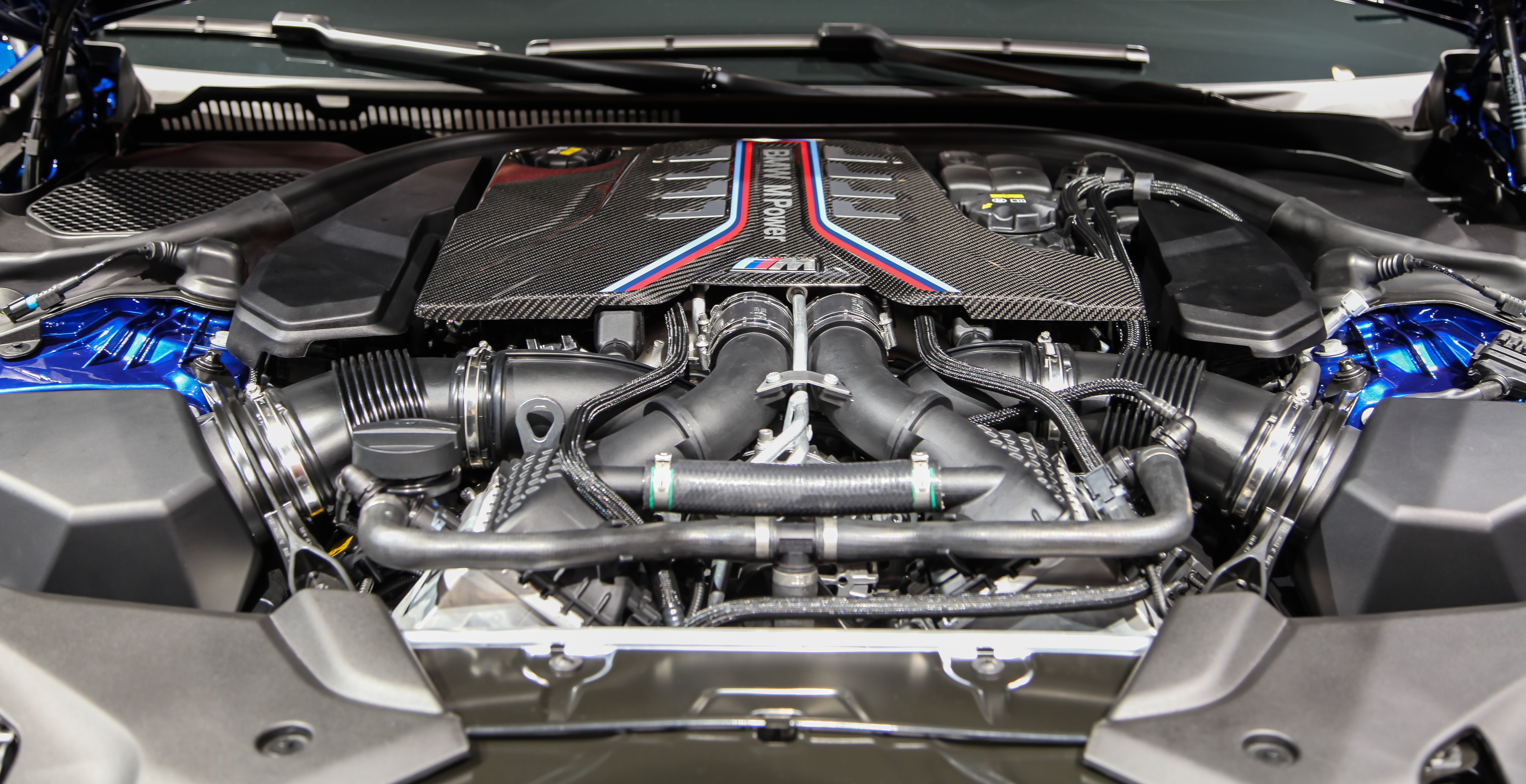
BMW S63 twin-turbocharged V8 engine

=== Engine and transmission ===
The engine is an evolution of the S63 from the previous generation. With a power output of 441 kW (600 PS; 591 hp) the new M5 has the same power as the limited edition "Competition Package" and "30 Jahre M5" models of the previous generation, while the torque has been raised to 750 N⋅m (553 lb⋅ft), 70 N⋅m (52 lb⋅ft) more than in the previous M5.

The transmission is the eight-speed ZF 8HP automatic transmission. The F90 is the first M5 to use a torque converter automatic transmission (compared with the previous generation's dual-clutch transmission), which BMW states was chosen for its durability and because shift times are not significantly slower than a dual-clutch transmission. The manual transmission previously offered in North America was discontinued.

=== Competition Package ===
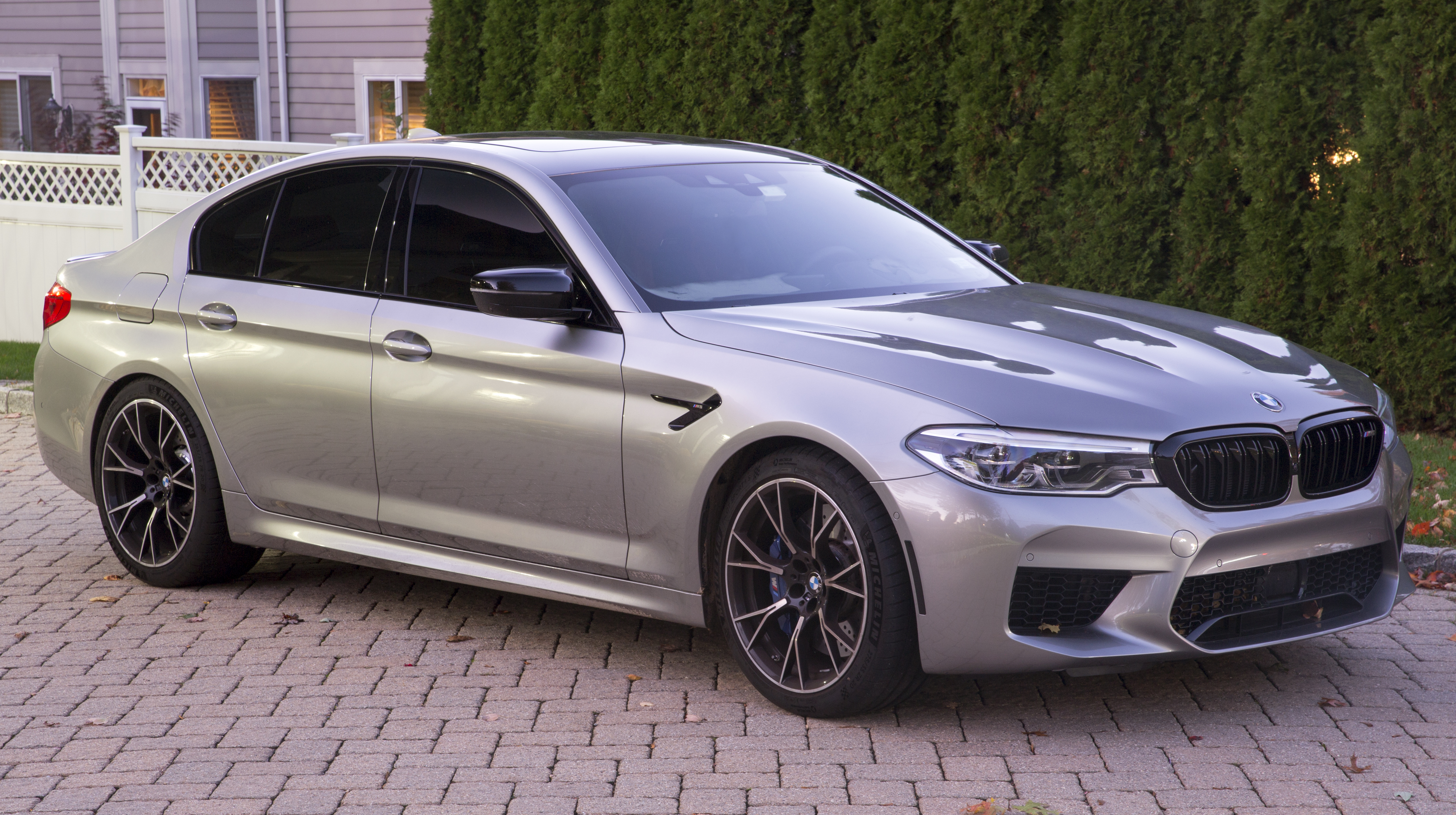
M5 Competition

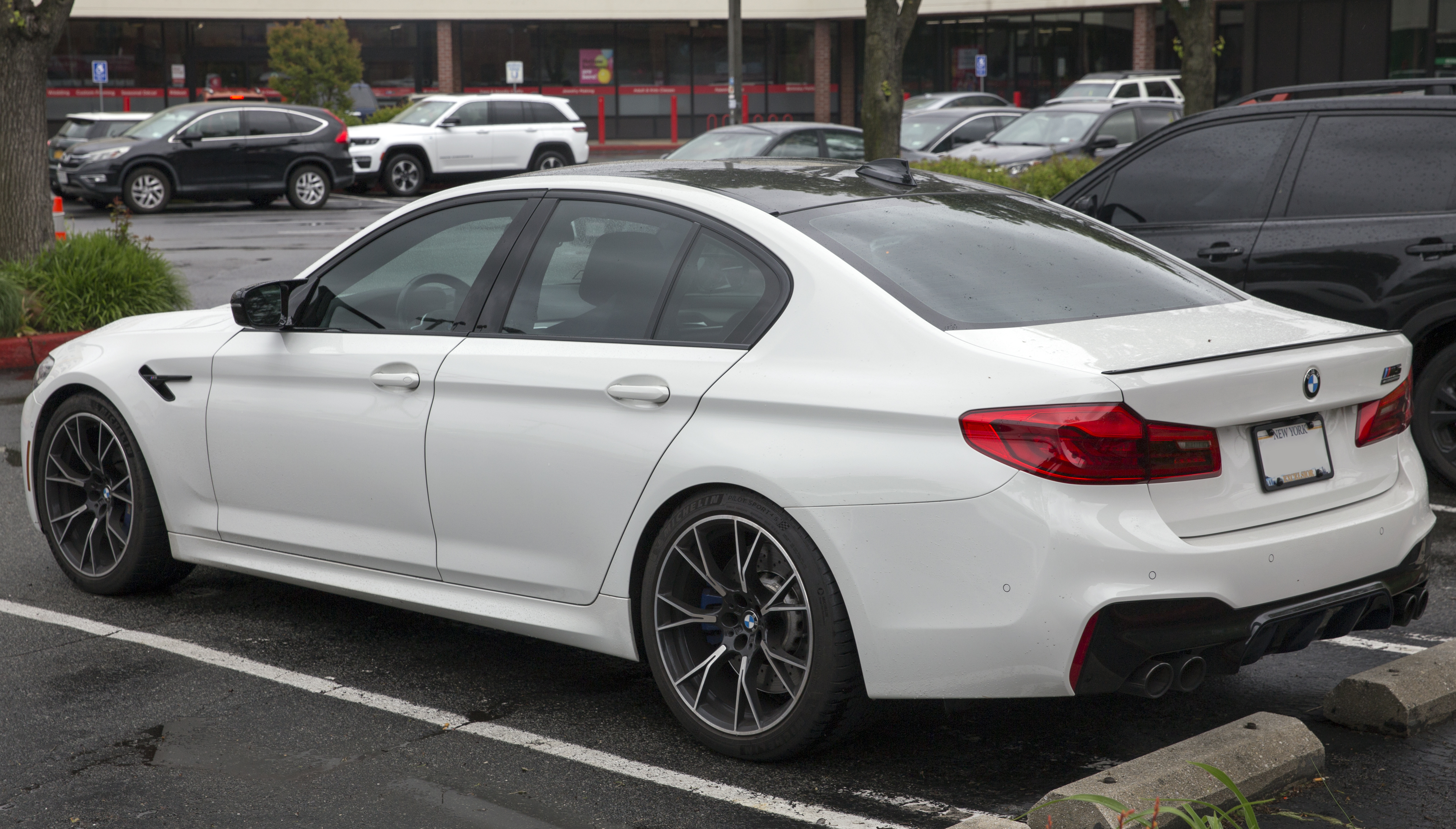
M5 Competition

The "Competition Package" was introduced in August 2018, with power increased to 460 kW (617 hp; 625 PS) at 6,000 rpm and torque remaining unchanged at 750 N⋅m (553 lb⋅ft) between 1,800 and 5,800 rpm. The official zero to 100 km/h (62 mph) acceleration time was reduced by 0.1 seconds compared with the regular M5 meaning zero to 100 km/h (62 mph) takes 3.1 seconds in accordance with BMW. Other changes include stiffer springs, increased front camber, a 7 mm (0.3 in) lower ride height, revised wheels and a redesigned exhaust system with a particulate filter added. In a test by sport auto the M5 Competition lapped the Nürburgring in 7:35.90. Although advertised at 460 kW (617 hp) (measured at the crank) the M5 Competition in Car and Driver's dyno test showed 460 kW (617 hp; 626 PS) at the wheels, suggesting a higher output than advertised.

=== Facelift ===
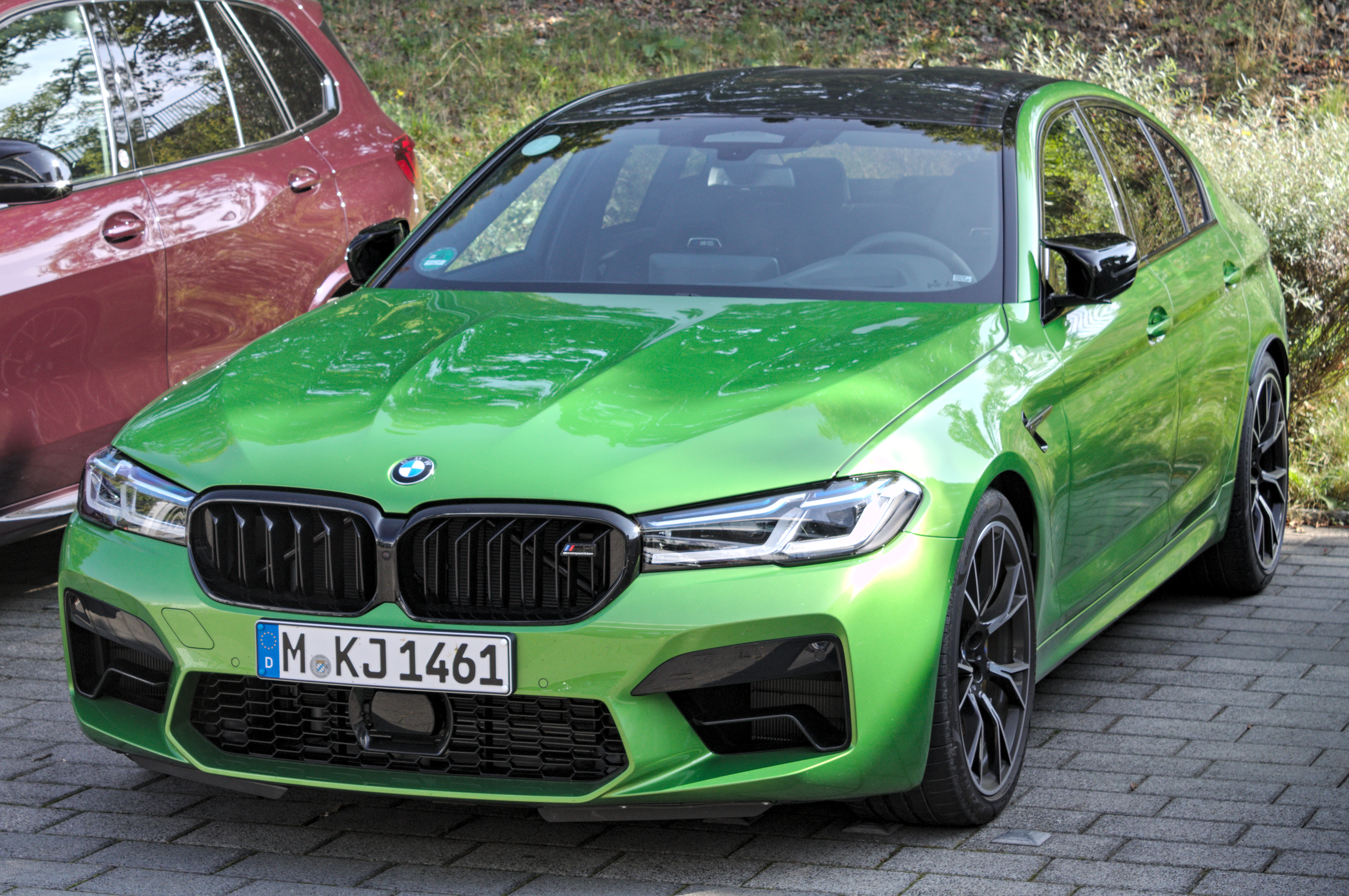
BMW M5 LCI

The F90 M5 facelift was unveiled in June 2020 for the 2021 model year. Major highlights of the facelift included revised headlamps and taillamps with the headlamps featuring a minimalist L-shaped design for the daytime running lights. The front bumper and rear bumpers were also redesigned, now featuring an overall sharp design. The base model didn't receive any mechanical changes while the M5 Competition now has revised shock absorbers and tuning for the adjustable suspension system. The variant also gets a new "Track" mode which when enabled shuts off all driver aids and the infotainment system for a more focused driving experience. Five new exterior colours were added to the colour options which include Motegi Red, Brands Hatch Grey, Tanzanite Blue II, Individual Aventurine Red and Frozen Bluestone.

On the interior, the M5 now has a 12.3-inch infotainment display replacing the previous 10.25-inch unit. The system was also upgraded to iDrive 7.0 from the previous NBT EVO ID6. New features for the infotainment system include wireless Android Auto functionality, natural speech recognition, and BMW's cloud-based navigation that provides faster route calculations and more up-to-date traffic information. Two new upholstery options were added to the interior those being black leather and beige Alcantara upholstery. The facelift M5 was made available for sale in August 2020.

=== M5 CS (Competition Sport) ===
This is the first ever CS version of the M5, the car entered production in March 2021. Its notable differences include:

- increased engine power by ten horsepower to 467 kW (635 PS; 626 hp),
- 116 kg (256 lb) lighter than the regular M5, with an exact weight of 1,866 kg (4,114 lb),
- Four bucket seats, with the Nürburgring track layout printed on the headrests, in place of the standard seating,
- Gold-coloured exterior trims,
- M Carbon ceramic brakes fitted as standard,
- Two heat extractor vents in the hood.

Carbon fiber-reinforced polymers (CFRP) are used for the hood, front splitter, exterior mirror caps, lip spoiler and the rear diffuser, contributing to a weight saving of 70 kg over the M5 Competition. Despite these improvements, the top speed remains the same at 305 km/h (190 mph), and it only comes in three colours (two of which are BMW Individual colours): Brands Hatch Grey Metallic, Frozen Brands Hatch Grey Metallic, and Frozen Deep Green Metallic.

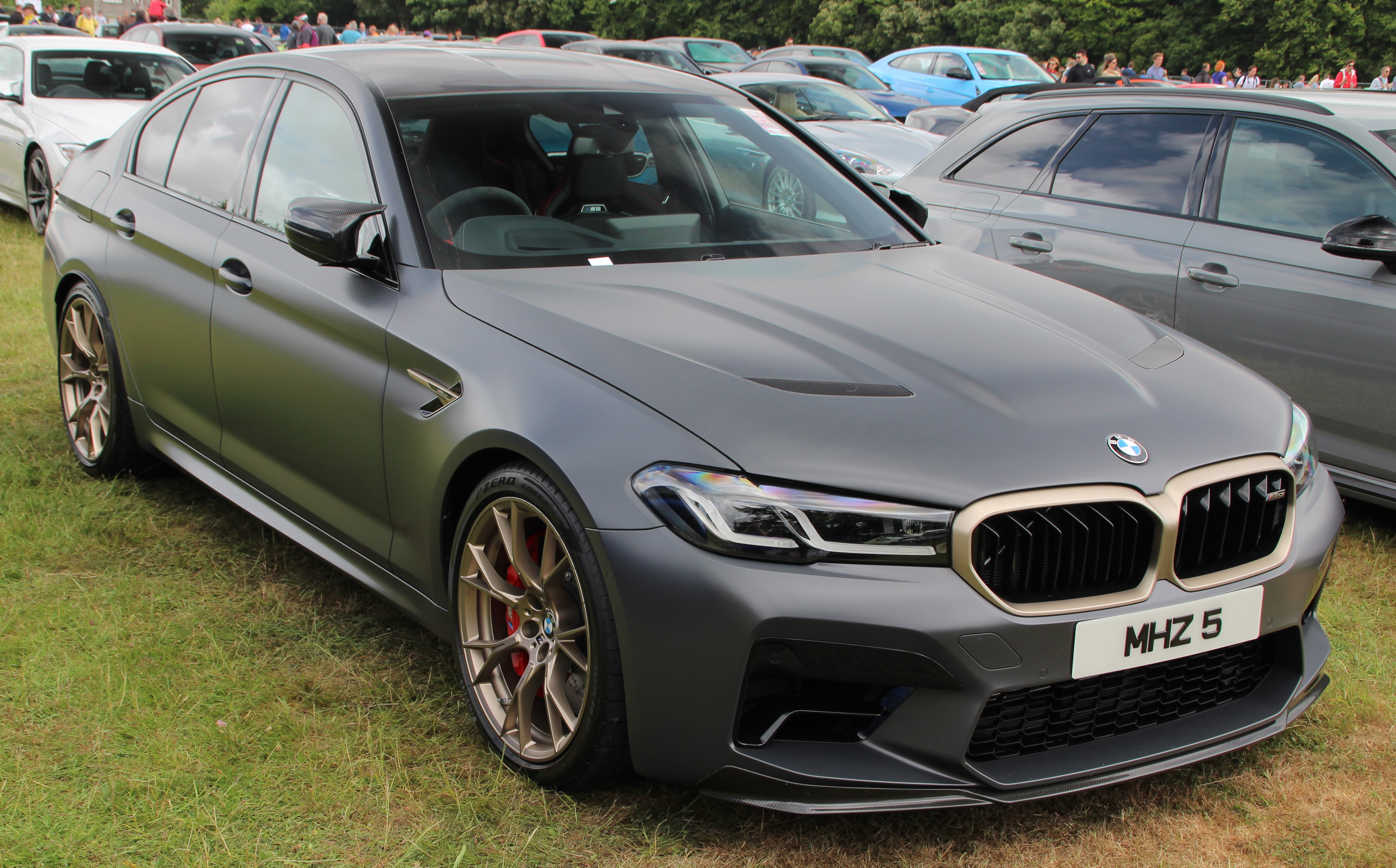
2021 M5 CS

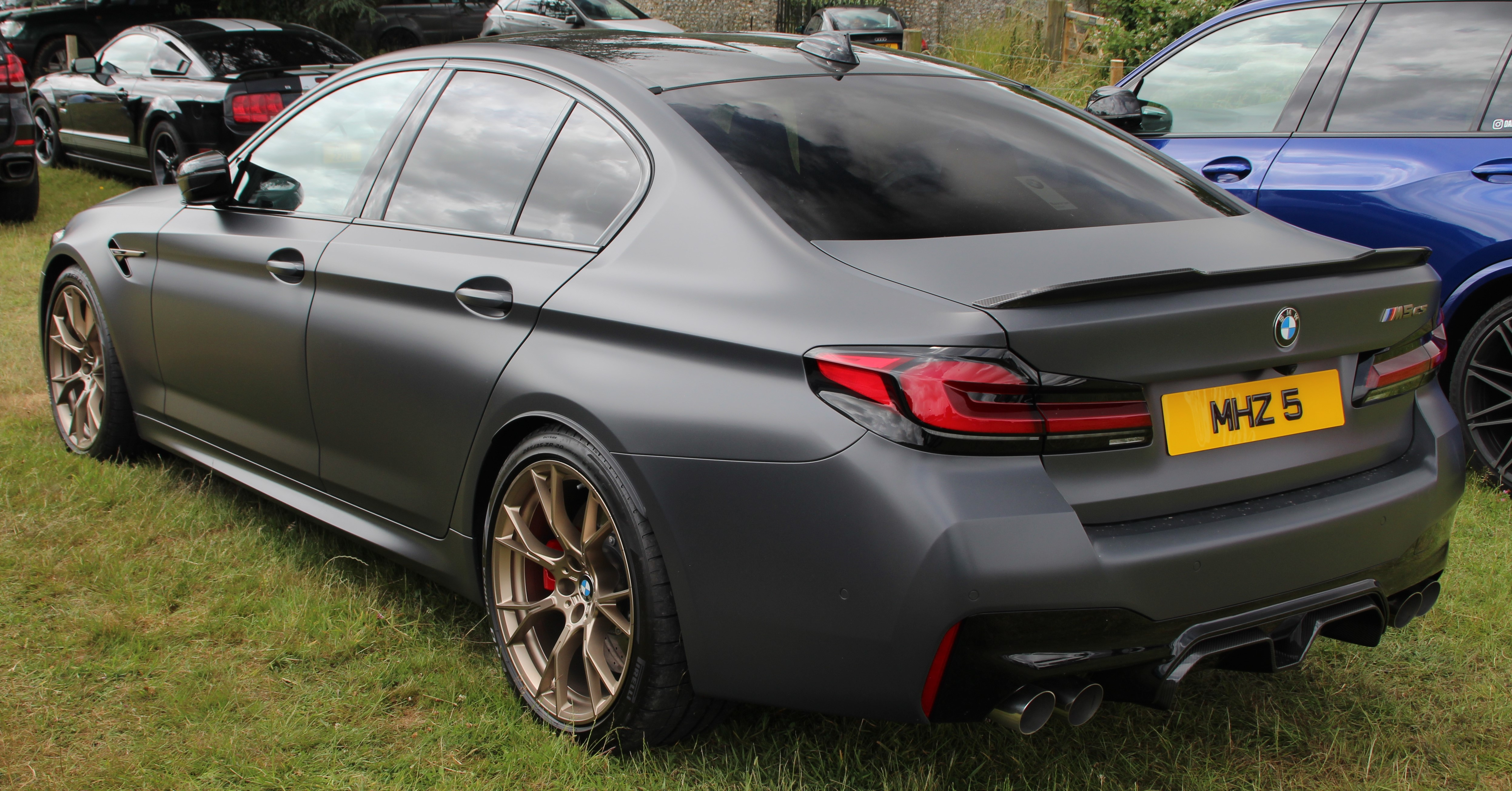
2021 M5 CS rear

=== M Performance Parts ===
The M5 can be fitted with M Performance Parts which are similar to the ones used in the CS. These include a splitter, side skirts, spoiler, diffuser and carbon fibre parts.

=== Special editions ===
BMW made a 400-unit special edition for its debut of the F90 M5 with an individual Frozen Dark Red Metallic colour and an individual smoke white interior with Piano Black wood trim that includes a "1/400" inscription right below the iDrive control knob. BMW called it the First Edition M5, and oddly enough they were produced in mid-2018.

To celebrate the 35th anniversary of the M5 in 2019, BMW built 350 units of the "35 Jahre M5". All 350 cars came in BMW special edition paint in the Individual colour shade called the BMW Individual Frozen Dark Grey II. On the interior, "35 Jahre M5" is embroidered on the front door sill finishers and the seat backrests, and plaque bearing "35 Jahre M5" and "1/350" inscriptions is placed on the dashboard.

== G90/G99 M5 (2024–present) ==
BMW M5 (G90/G99)
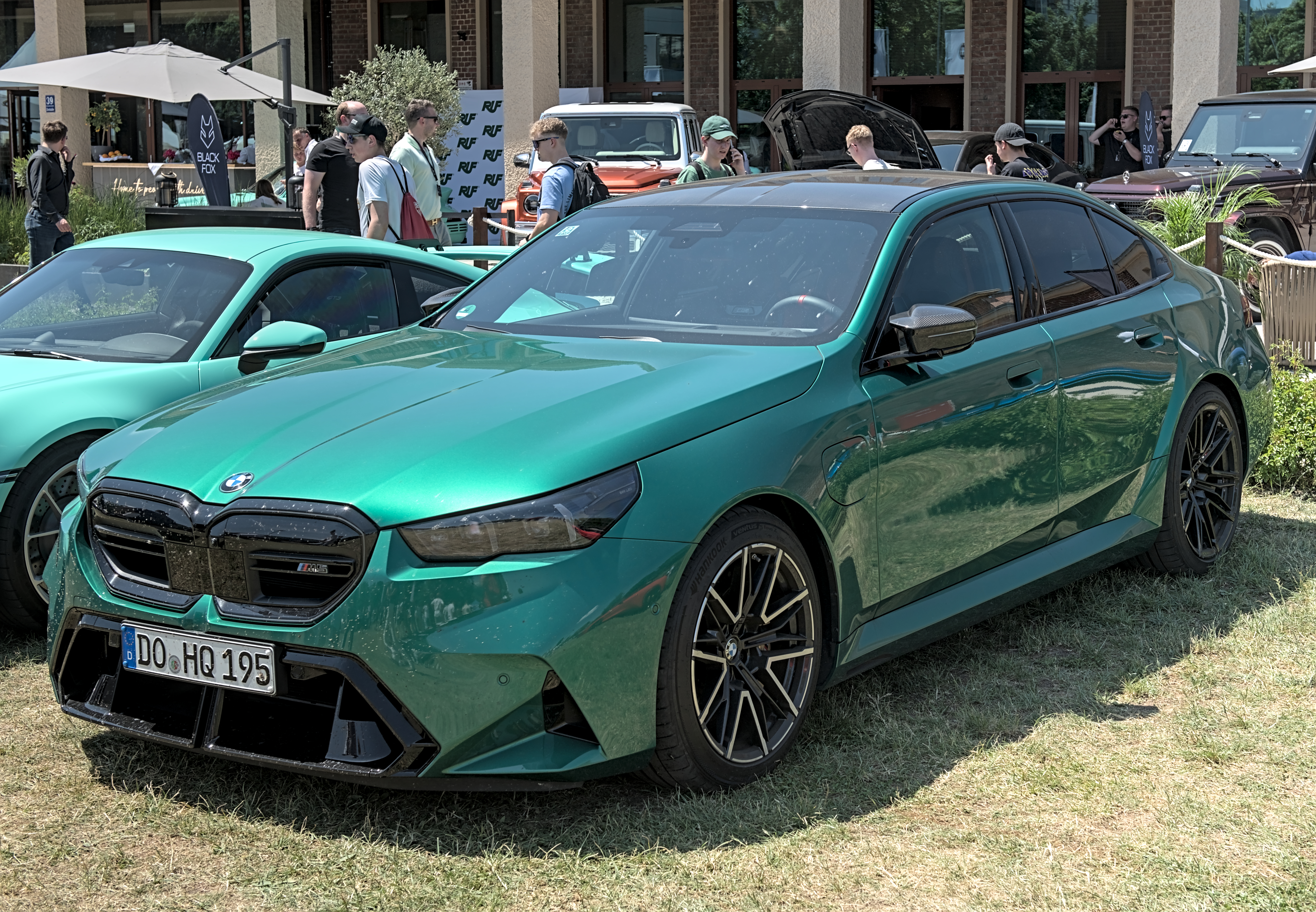

Overview
- Manufacturer: BMW
- Production: 2024–present
- Model years: 2025-present
- Designer: José Casas

Body and chassis
- Body style: 4-door saloon (G90); 5-door estate (G99)
- Layout: Front-engine, all-wheel-drive (xDrive)
- Platform: Cluster Architecture (CLAR)
- Related: BMW 5 Series (G60)

Powertrain
- Engine: Petrol plug-in hybrid: 4.4 L S68 twin-turbo V8
- Electric motor: Permanent magnet synchronous motor
- Power output: 535 kW (727 PS; 717 hp)
- Transmission: 8-speed ZF 8HP automatic
- Hybrid drivetrain: PHEV

Dimensions
- Wheelbase: 3,006 mm (118.3 in)
- Length: 5,096 mm (200.6 in)
- Width: 1,970 mm (77.6 in)
- Height: 1,510 mm (59.4 in)
- Curb weight: 2,510 kg (5,533 lb)

The G90 M5 is based on the G60 5 Series and shares its powertrain with the XM. BMW M confirmed an estate version on 26 June 2023. This is the first time that the M5 Touring is sold in North America. and the first time the M5 has come in an estate body style since the E61. It was showcased and announced in June 2024 and became available in November 2024.

=== Powertrain ===
The G90 M5 is BMW M's first saloon car to be a plug-in hybrid, being powered by the 4.4-litre twin-turbocharged S68 V8 engine, paired with an electric motor, which is integrated into the 8-speed automatic torque-converter gearbox. This hybrid setup generates a total system power output of 535 kW (727 PS; 717 hp) and 1,000 N⋅m (738 lb⋅ft) of torque. Of that, the 4.4-litre twin-turbo V8 S68 engine, which can also be found in the XM and the X5M, contributes 430 kW (585 PS; 577 hp) and 750 N⋅m (553 lb⋅ft), with the electric motor making up the rest, contributing 145 kW (197 PS; 194 hp) and 280 N⋅m (207 lb⋅ft).

=== Weight ===
The G90 M5 weighs 2,435 kg (5,368 lb) in European spec, 2,445 kg (5,390 lb) in North American spec), which makes it approximately 500 kg (1,100 lb) heavier than the previous F90 M5. The significant increase in weight was criticised heavily. Despite this increased weight, BMW claims the G90 M5 can still achieve a 0-100 km/h (62 mph) time of 3.5 seconds, and reach 0-200 km/h (120 mph) in 10.9 seconds. Its electronically limited top speed of 250 km/h (160 mph) can be raised to 305 km/h (190 mph) with the optional M Driver's Pack. Although it is fast, this is the first time in M5 history where the newer model's power to weight ratio isn't higher than its predecessor due to the added weight. The previous F90 M5 could hit 0-100 km/h (62 mph) in 3.3 seconds, whereas the G90 M5 takes 3.5 seconds. However, this was done because as Frank Van Meel, the BMW M CEO says, "Keeping the V8 and making the car comply with stricter emissions regulations was only possible with a plug-in hybrid setup. In addition, the PHEV allows the M5 to dodge the huge taxes applied in some countries on high-emissions vehicles."

Power-to-Weight Ratio of BMW M5 Models
Model	Power/Weight Ratio
E28 M5	200
E34 M5	206
E39 M5	236
E60 M5	289
F10 M5	321
F90 M5	335
G90 M5 (Present)	299

=== Driving modes ===
The hybrid system offers multiple driving modes: • HYBRID Mode balances performance and efficiency. • ELECTRIC Mode allows speeds up to 140 km/h (87 mph) on electric power alone. Its 18.6 kWh battery provides a claimed electric-only range of 67 km (42 mi) in Europe (WLTP). • eCONTROL Mode optimises energy recuperation to preserve battery charge. • Dynamic and Dynamic Plus can adjust cooling and the drive system to keep peak performance over an extended period of time or maximise performance in short bursts.

=== Features ===
BMW has retained the M xDrive all-wheel-drive system from the F90 with a rear-wheel bias, allowing for differing power amounts that can be sent to the rear wheels and includes a rear-wheel-drive-only mode. The exterior design incorporates signature M elements, such as flared wheel arches, a sculpted front end, and illuminated glow kidney grills. It rides on 20-inch front and 21-inch rear wheels, with the option for M Carbon ceramic brakes for enhanced stopping power. Inside, the G90 offers 20 mm more rear legroom than its predecessor, thanks to a longer wheelbase. The interior showcases a Curved Display and an updated iDrive system from its predecessor which can be controlled by natural speech, touch, or smartphone integration. Standard features include a Bowers & Wilkins Surround Sound System, four-zone climate control, and a heated steering wheel.

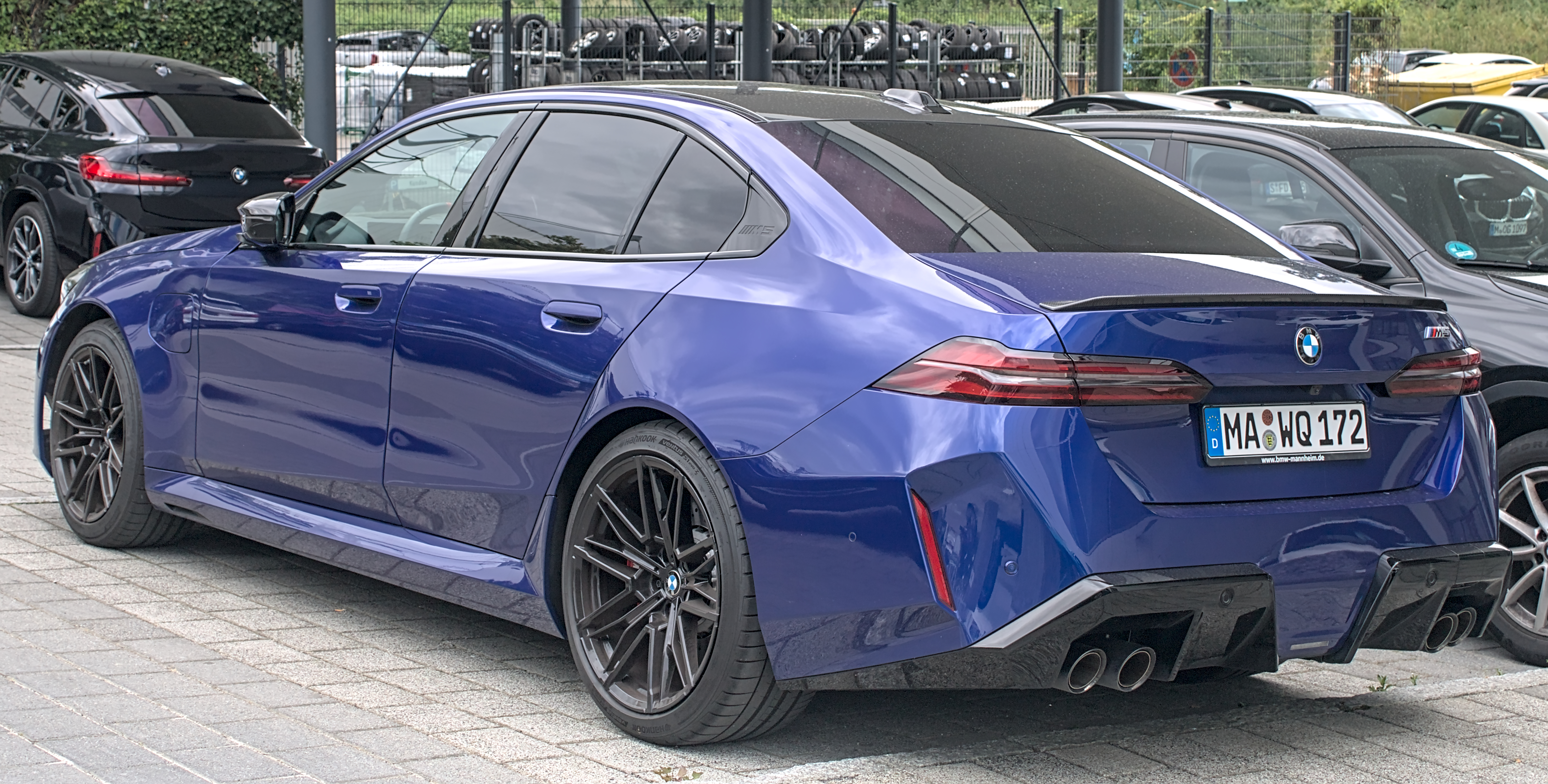
Rear view

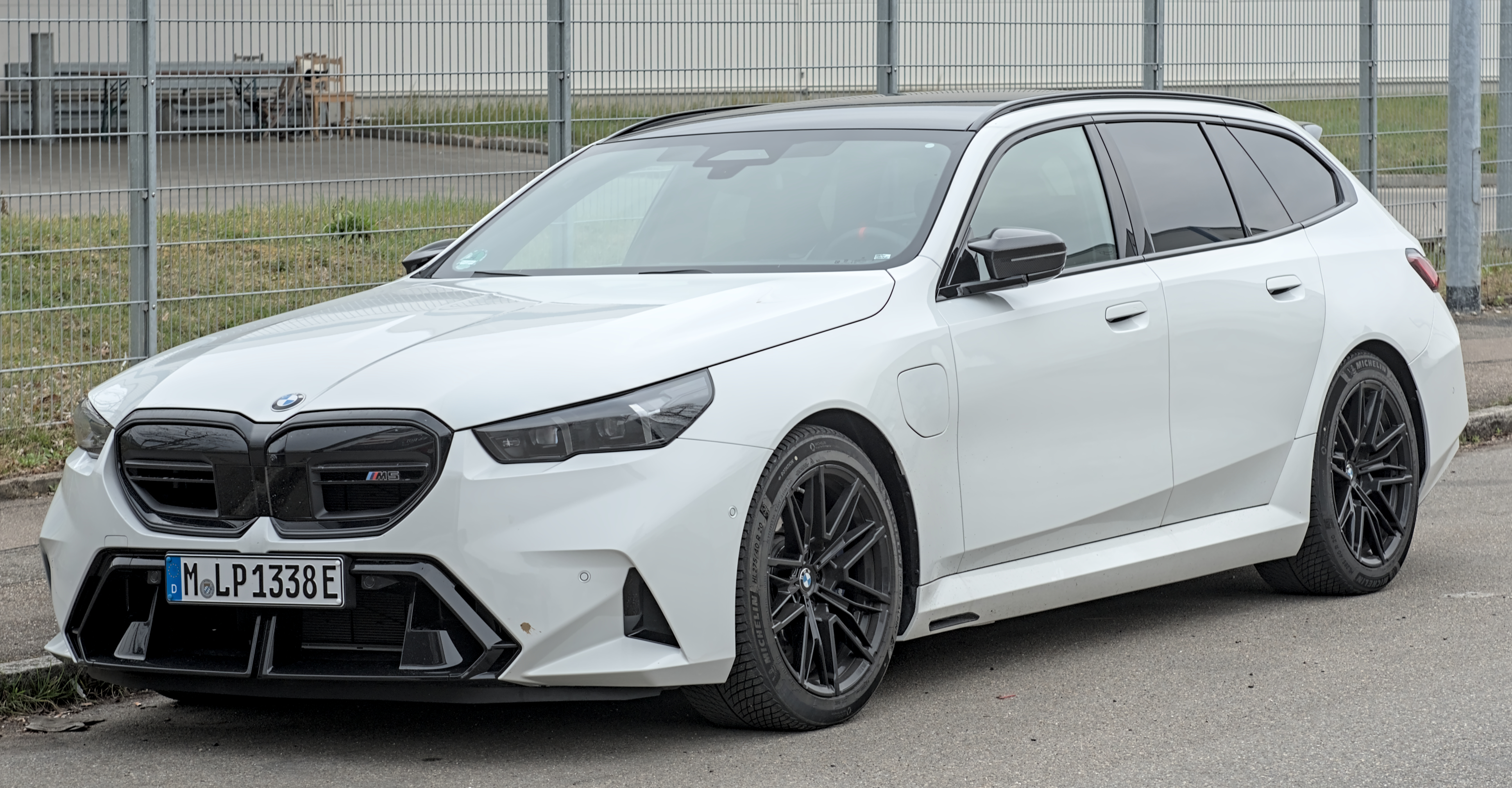
BMW M5 Touring (G99)

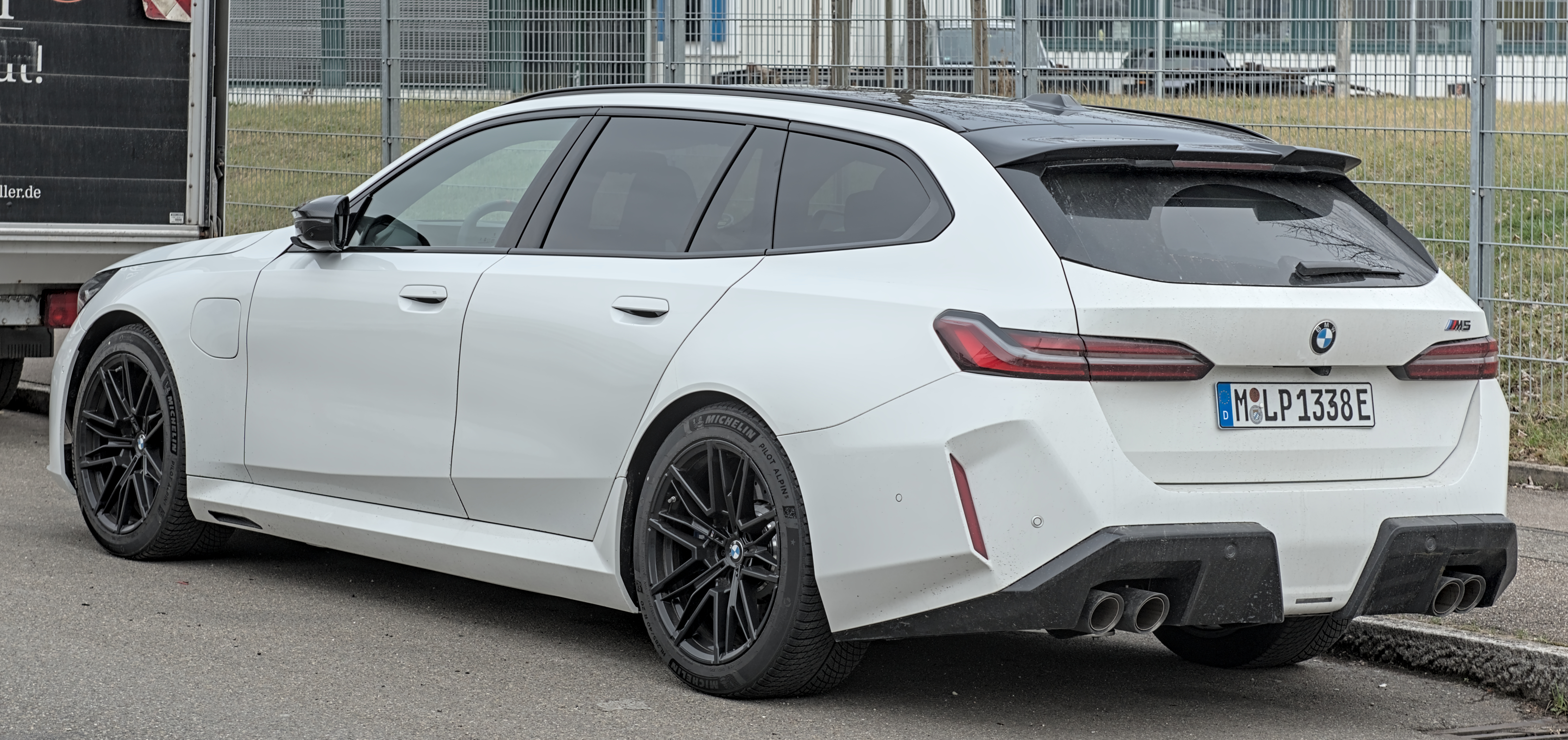
M5 Touring (rear view)

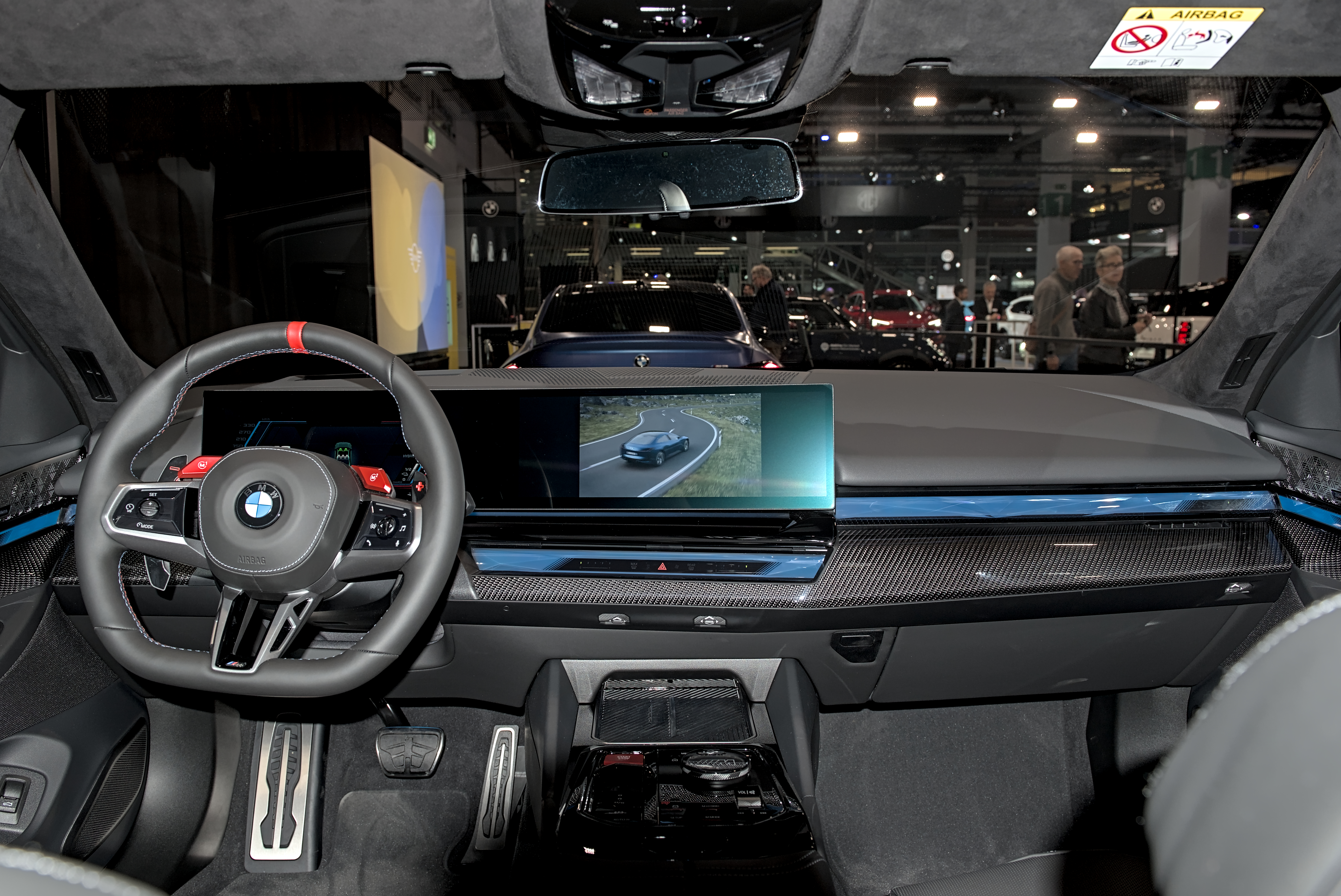
Interior (G90)

=== Pricing and release ===
Priced starting at $119,500, the G90 M5 made its global debut at the Goodwood Festival of Speed in July 2024. Production began in the same month at BMW's Dingolfing plant, with the initial market launch in November 2024. The M5 Touring variant was introduced for the 2025 model year in the US.

== See also ==
- BMW 5 Series
- BMW M6
- BMW M
- BMW 5 Series (G60)
