= S38 =

S38 may refer to:

- BMW S38, an automobile engine
- S38: In case of insufficient ventilation wear suitable respiratory equipment, a safety phrase
- Short S.38, a British biplane
- Sikorsky S-38, a 1928 American amphibious sesquiplane
- Sulfur-38, an isotope of sulfur
- USS S-38 (SS-143), a submarine of the United States Navy
