= BMW 5 Series =

Executive car

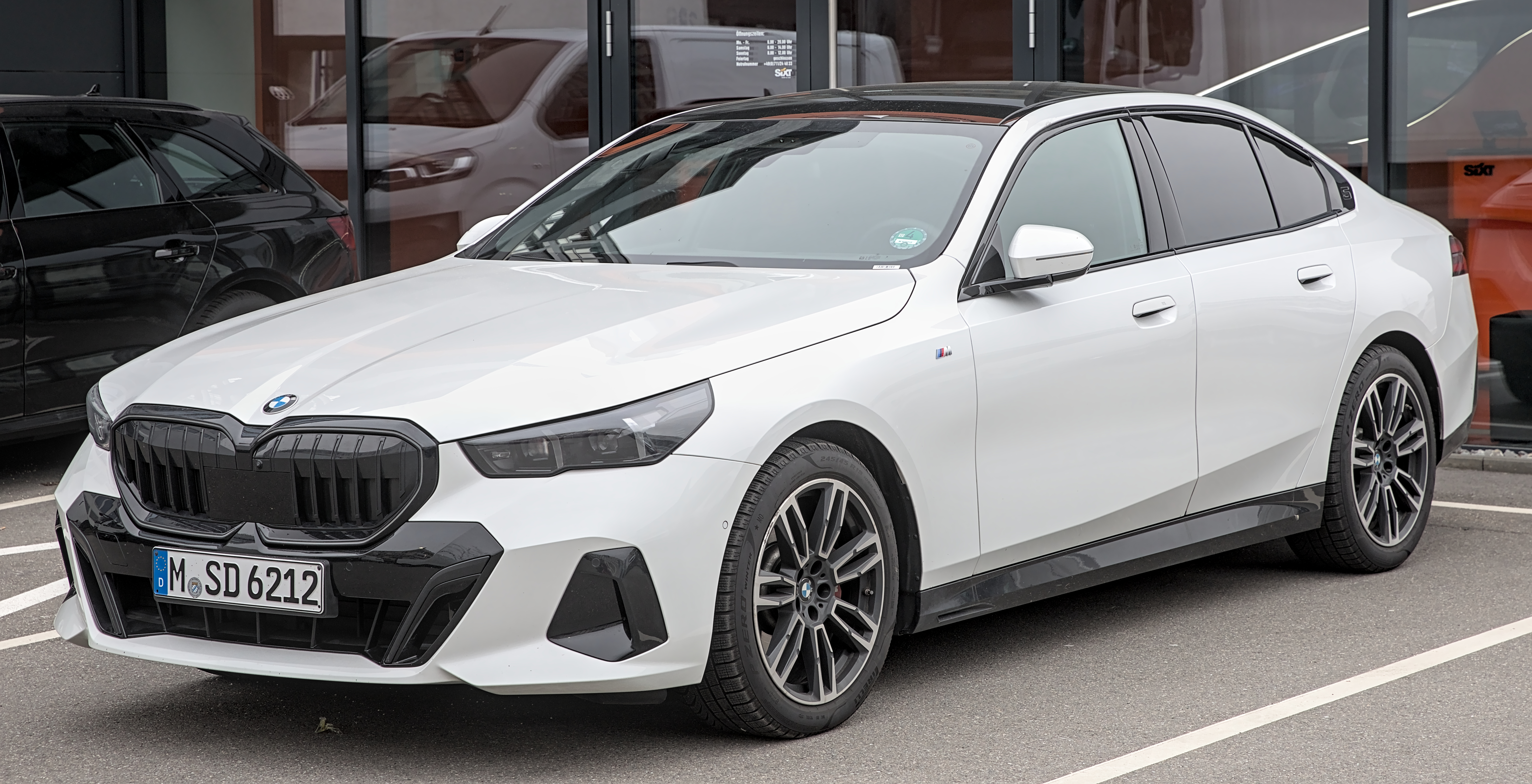

Overview
- Manufacturer: BMW
- Production: 1972–present

Body and chassis
- Class: Executive car (E)
- Body style: 4-door sedan 5-door wagon 5-door fastback (F07)
- Layout: Front-engine, rear-wheel-drive Front-engine, all-wheel-drive (xDrive)

Chronology
- Predecessor: BMW New Class

The BMW 5 Series is an executive car manufactured and marketed by BMW since 1972. It is the successor to the BMW New Class sedans and is currently in its eighth generation. The car is sold as either a sedan or, since 1991, a station wagon (marketed as "Touring"). A 5-door fastback (marketed as "Gran Turismo") was sold between 2009 and 2017. Each successive generation has been given an internal G-code designation since 2017. Previously, a F-code designation was used between 2010 and 2016, while an E-code designation was used between 1972 and 2010. These are used to distinguish each model and generation from each other.

The first generation of the 5 Series was powered by naturally aspirated four-cylinder and six-cylinder petrol engines. Following generations have been powered by four-cylinder, six-cylinder, V8 and V10 engines that are either naturally aspirated or turbocharged. Since 1982, diesel engines have been included in the 5 Series range.

The 5 Series is BMW's second-best-selling model after the 3 Series. On 29 January 2008, the 5 millionth 5 Series was manufactured, a 530d sedan in Carbon Black Metallic. It is BMW’s oldest nameplate still in production and the first model line to use "Series" in the name, debuting the three-digit model naming convention still used today. Since the E28, all generations of 5 Series have included an "M" model, called the BMW M5.

== First generation (E12; 1972) ==
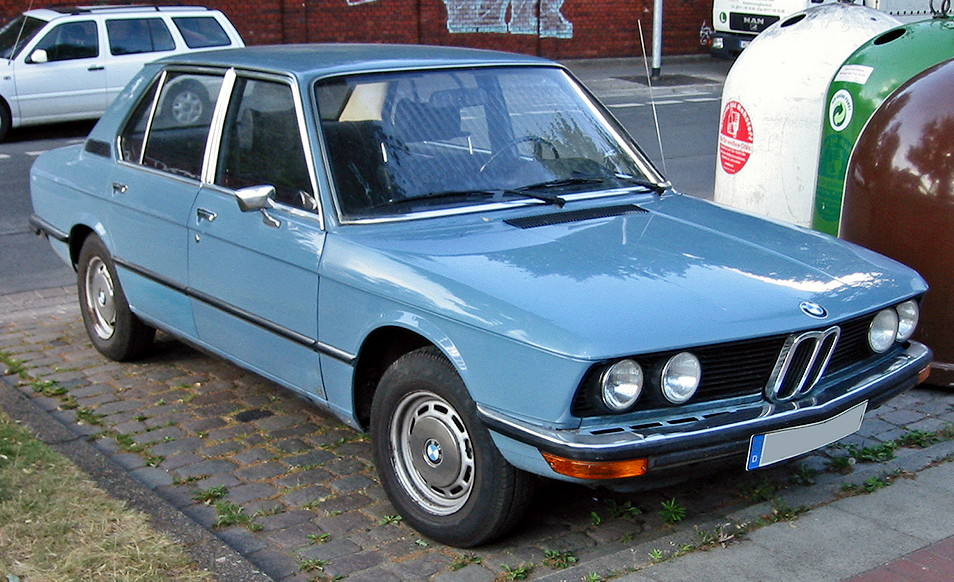
E12 front

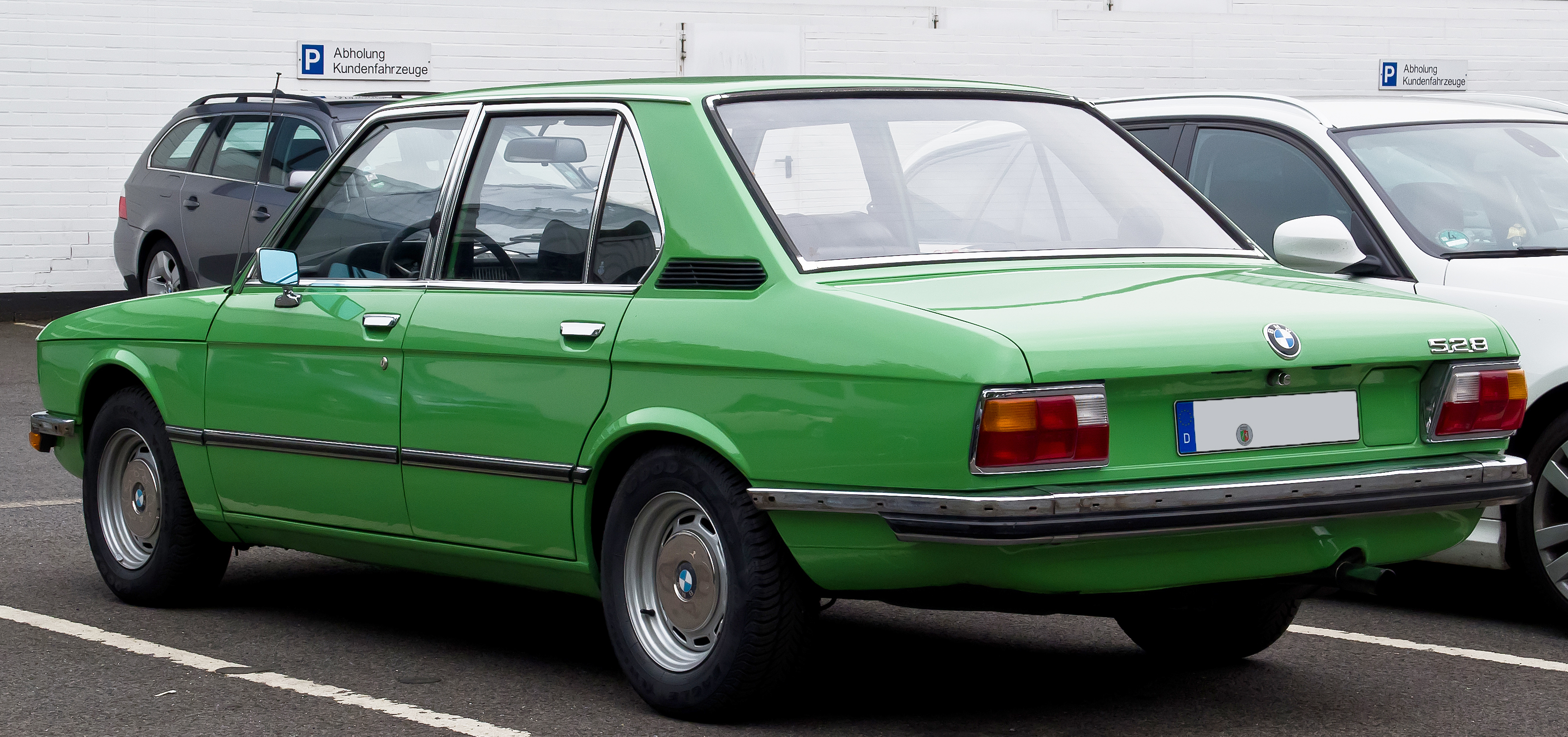
E12 rear

The E12 is the first generation of 5 Series, and was manufactured from 1972 to 1981. It replaced the New Class sedans and was produced in the sedan body style. The initial models were powered by four-cylinder engines, with a six-cylinder engine introduced a year later.

There was no M5 model for the E12, however the E12 M535i is considered the predecessor to the M5.

The E12 was replaced by the E28 in 1981, with South African production continuing until September 1985. The later South African models received the E28's interior; this model is called the E12/8.

== Second generation (E28; 1981) ==
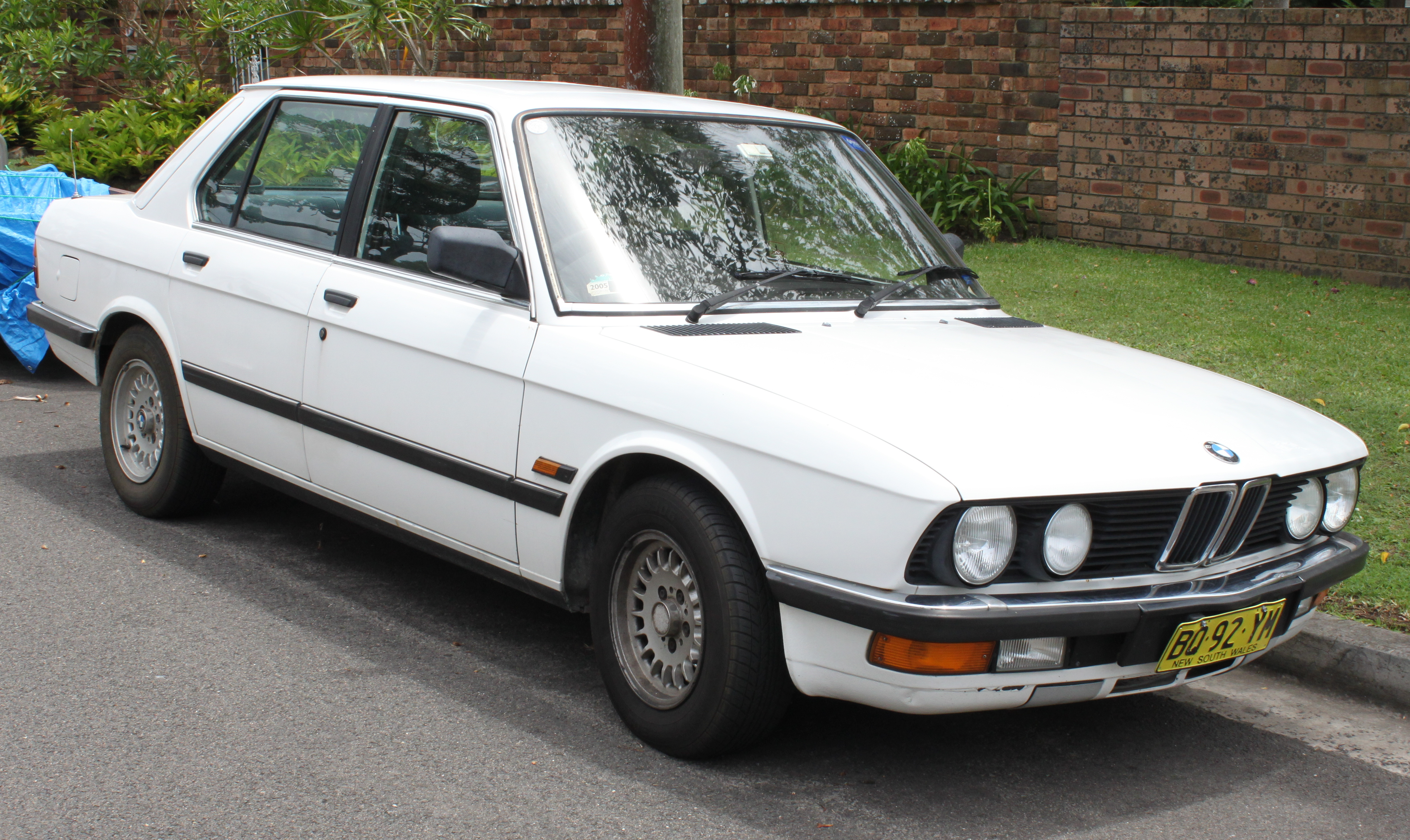
E28 front

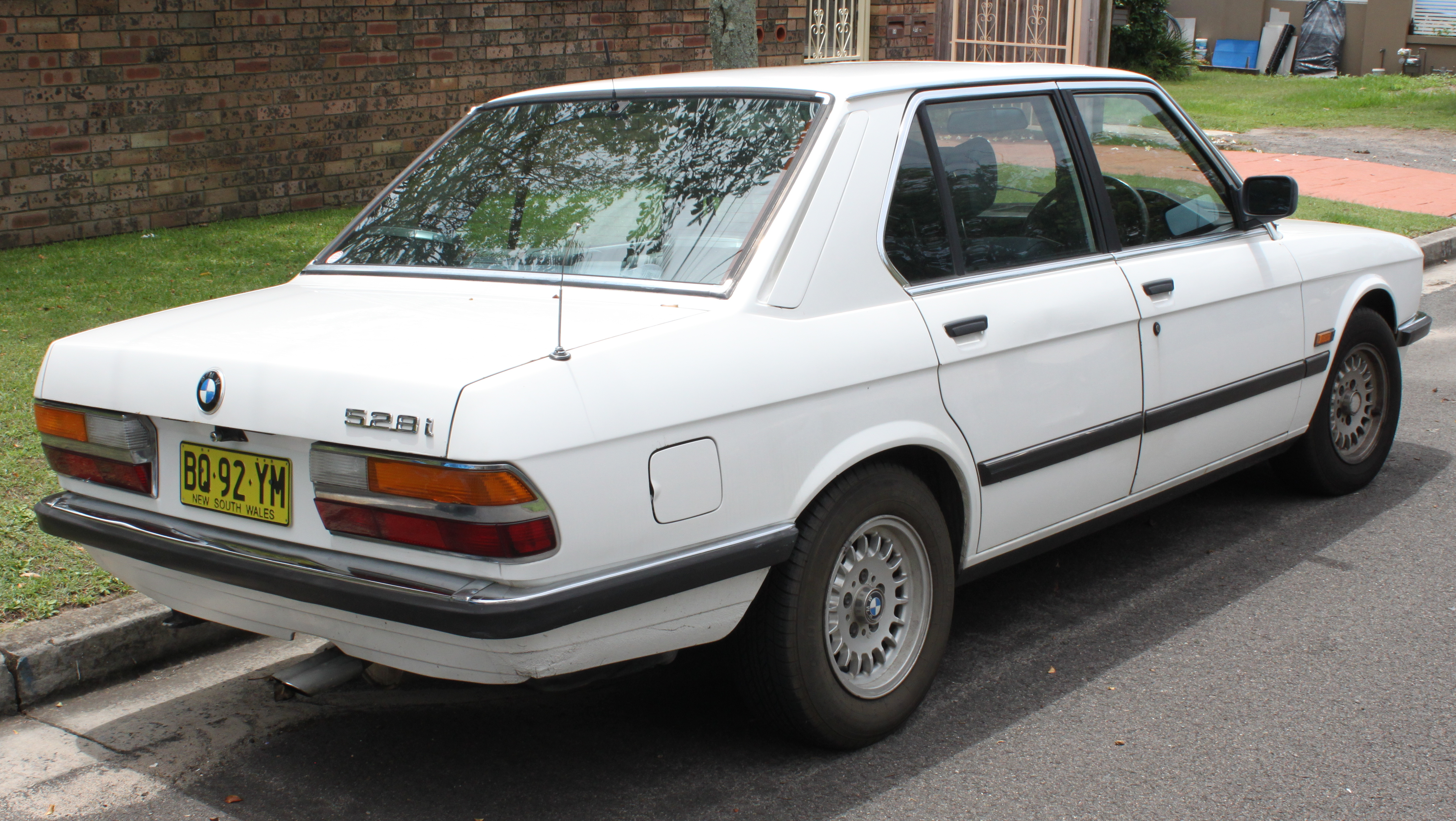
E28 rear

The E28 is the second generation of 5 Series, manufactured from 1981 to 1988 as a sedan. It was initially offered with petrol four-cylinder and six-cylinder engines.

In 1983, a diesel engine became available for the first time in a 5 Series. The E28 was the first 5 Series with the centre console angled towards the driver and the option of anti-lock brakes (ABS).

The E28 M5 began a line of M5 high performance models that has continued through every generation since. It was powered by the S38B35 and the M88/3 six-cylinder engines.

== Third generation (E34; 1988) ==
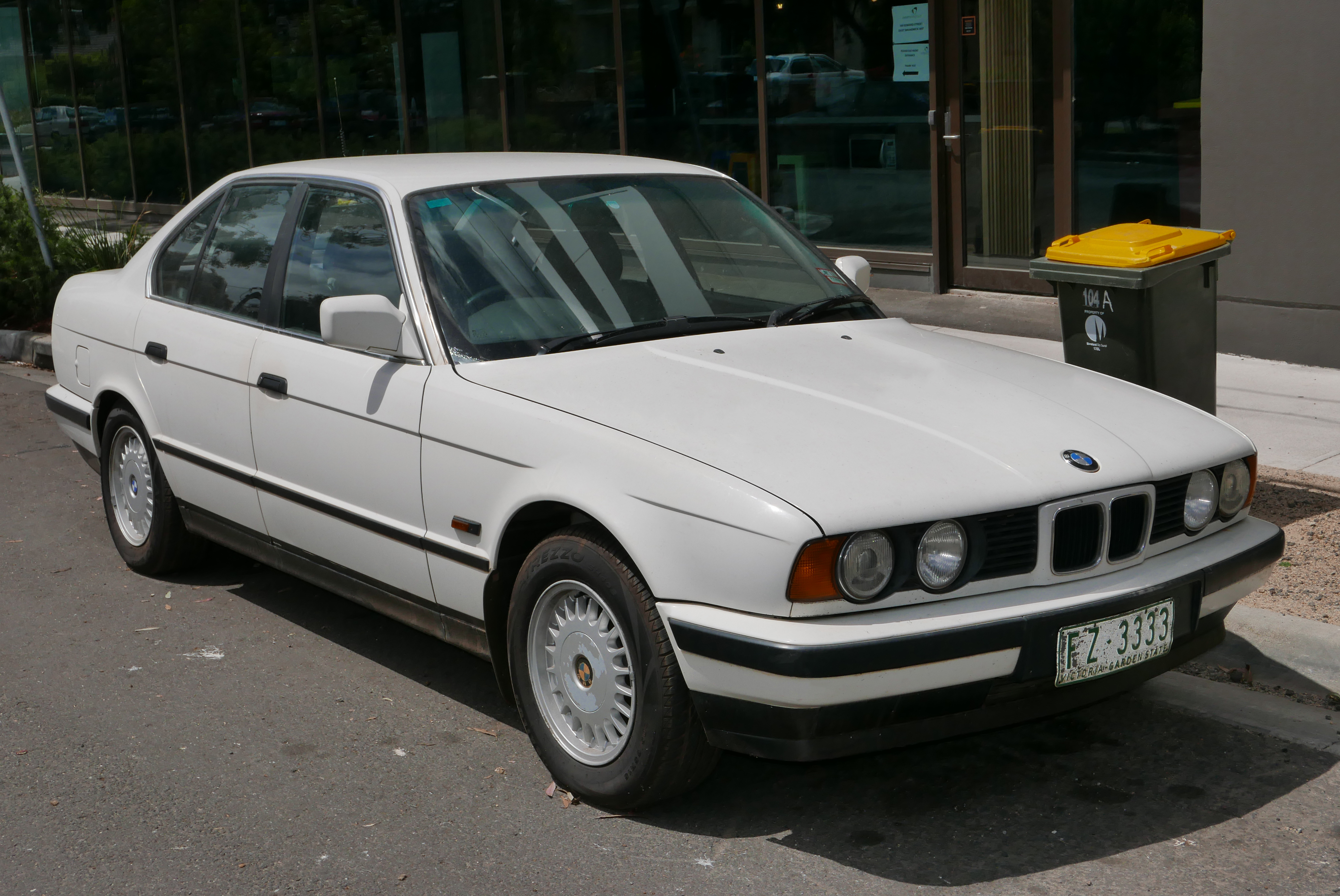
E34 front

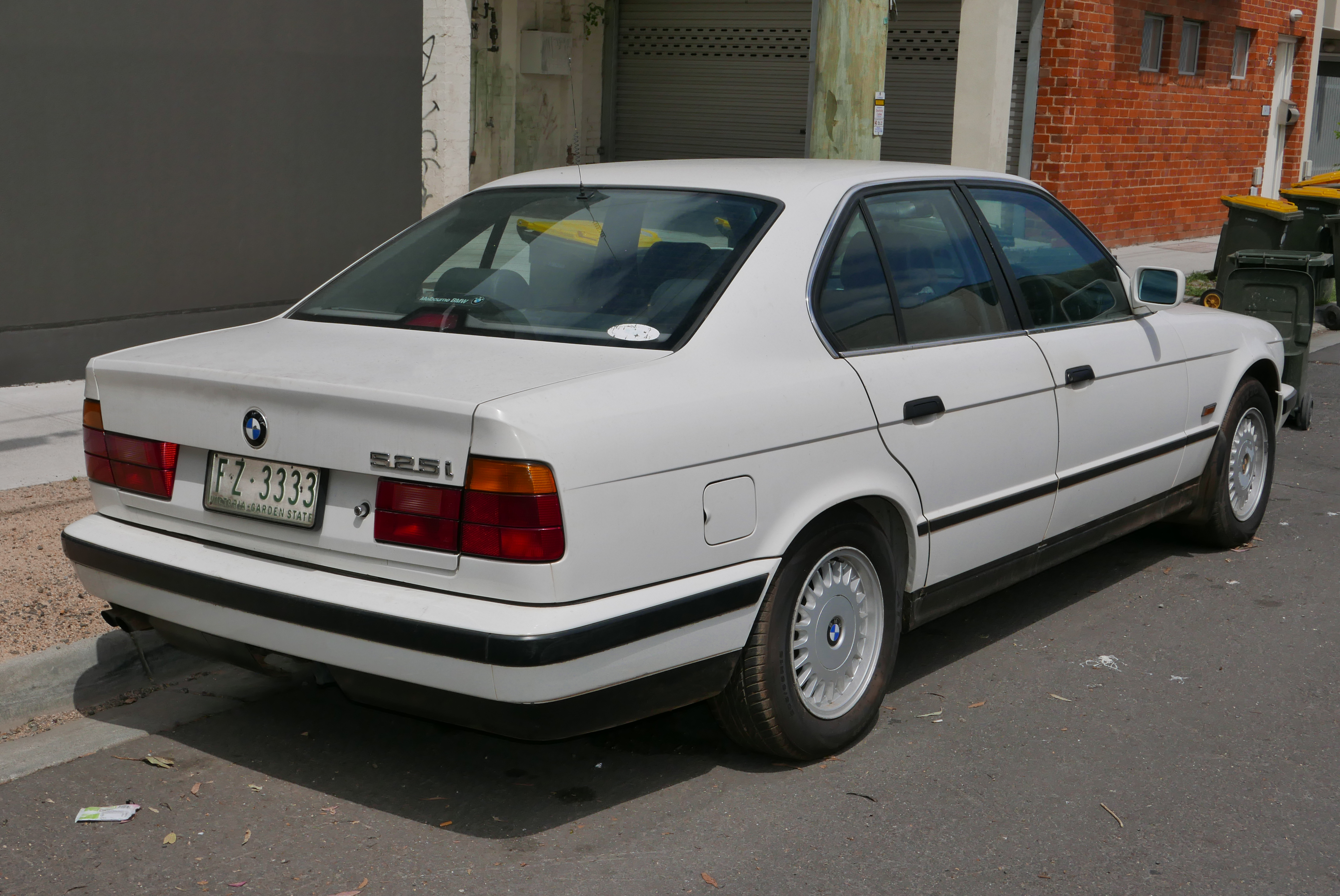
E34 rear

The E34 is the third generation of the 5 Series, manufactured from 1988 to 1996. It was launched in the sedan body style, with the range expanded in 1990 to include the "Touring" wagon/estate body style.

The E34 was the first 5 Series to be available with the wagon body style, all-wheel drive and V8 engines. It also saw the introduction of stability control (ASC), traction control (ASC+T), a 6-speed manual transmission and adjustable damping (EDC) to the 5 Series range.

Nine different engine families were used over its lifetime, consisting of four-cylinder, six-cylinder and V8 petrol engines, and six-cylinder diesel engines.

The E34 M5 is powered by the S38 six-cylinder engine and was produced in sedan and wagon body styles.

== Fourth generation (E39; 1995) ==
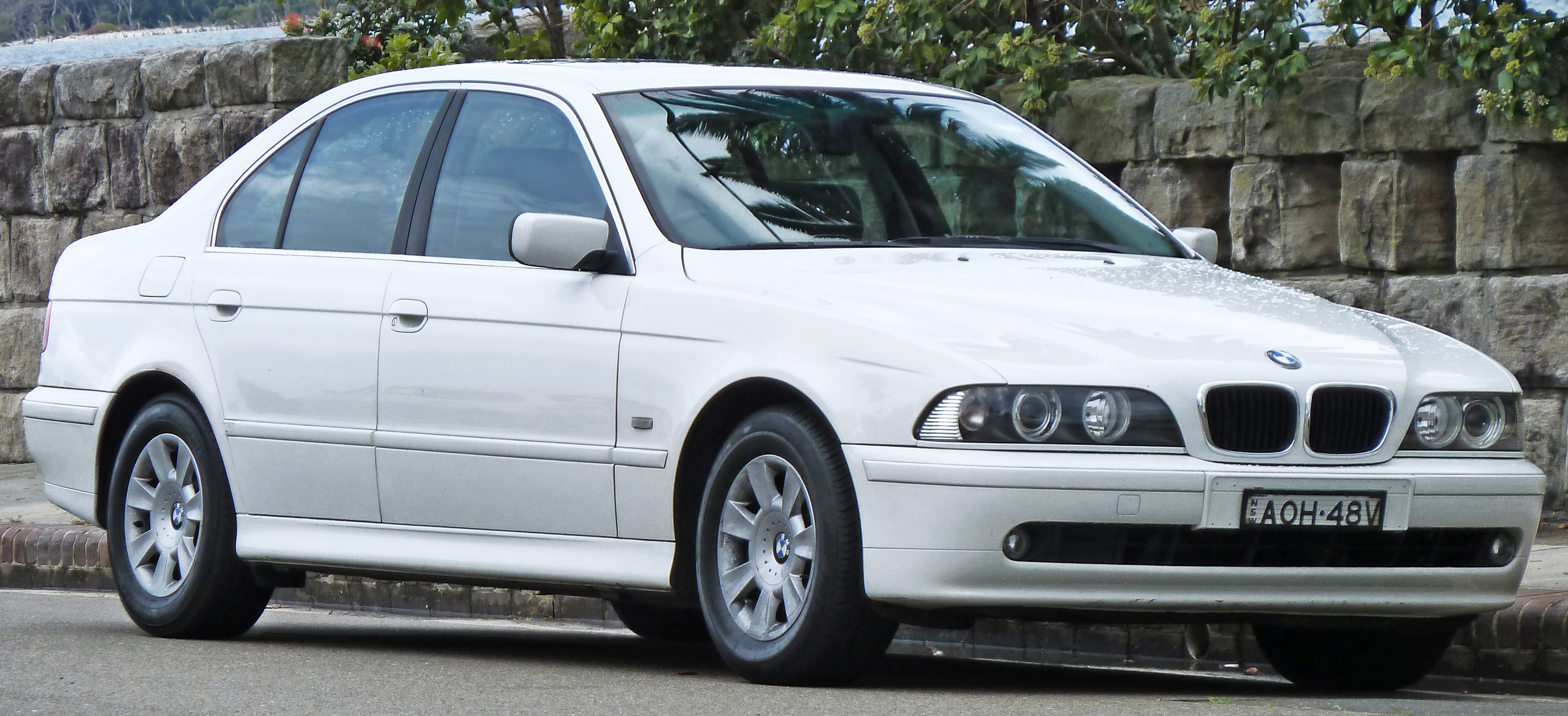
E39 front

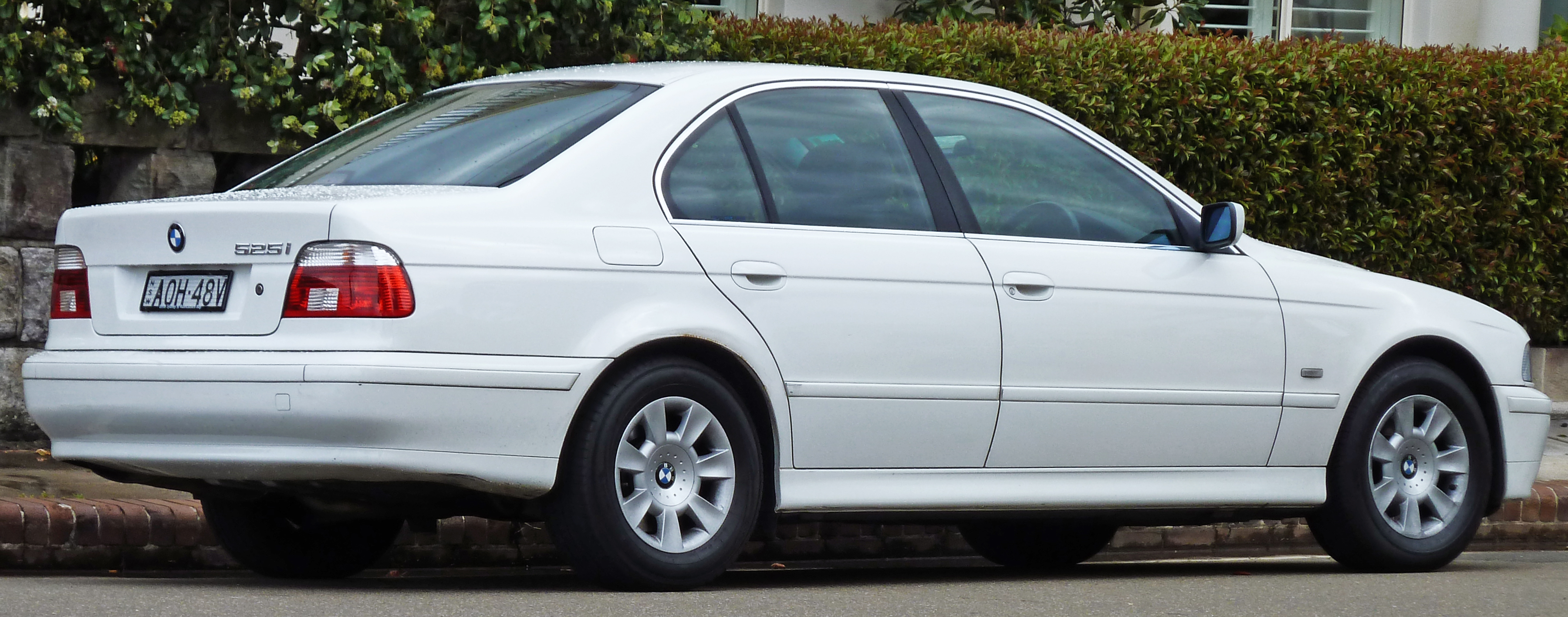
E39 rear

The E39 is the fourth generation of 5 Series, which was manufactured from 1995 to 2004. It was launched in the sedan body style, with the wagon/estate body style (marketed as "Touring") introduced in 1996.

The E39 was the first 5 Series to use aluminium components in the front suspension. The proportion of chassis components using aluminium significantly increased for the E39, in order to reduce weight. It was also the first 5 Series where a four-cylinder diesel engine was available.

V8 models used recirculating ball steering (as per previous 5 Series generations), however rack and pinion steering was used for the first time, in the four-cylinder and six-cylinder models. Unlike its E34 predecessor and E60 successor, the E39 was not available with all-wheel drive.

The E39 M5 sedan was introduced in 1998, powered by the 4.9-litre S62 V8 engine.

== Fifth generation (E60/E61; 2003) ==
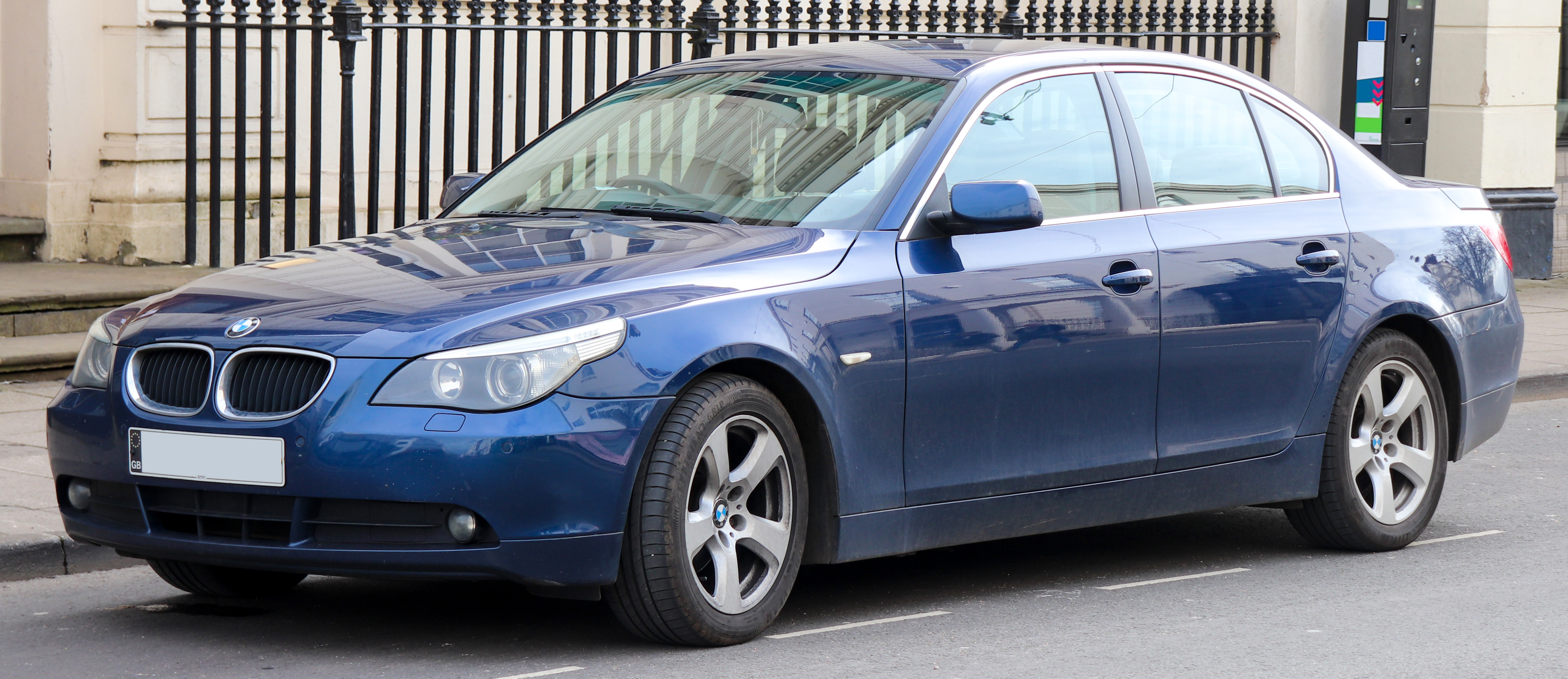
E60 front

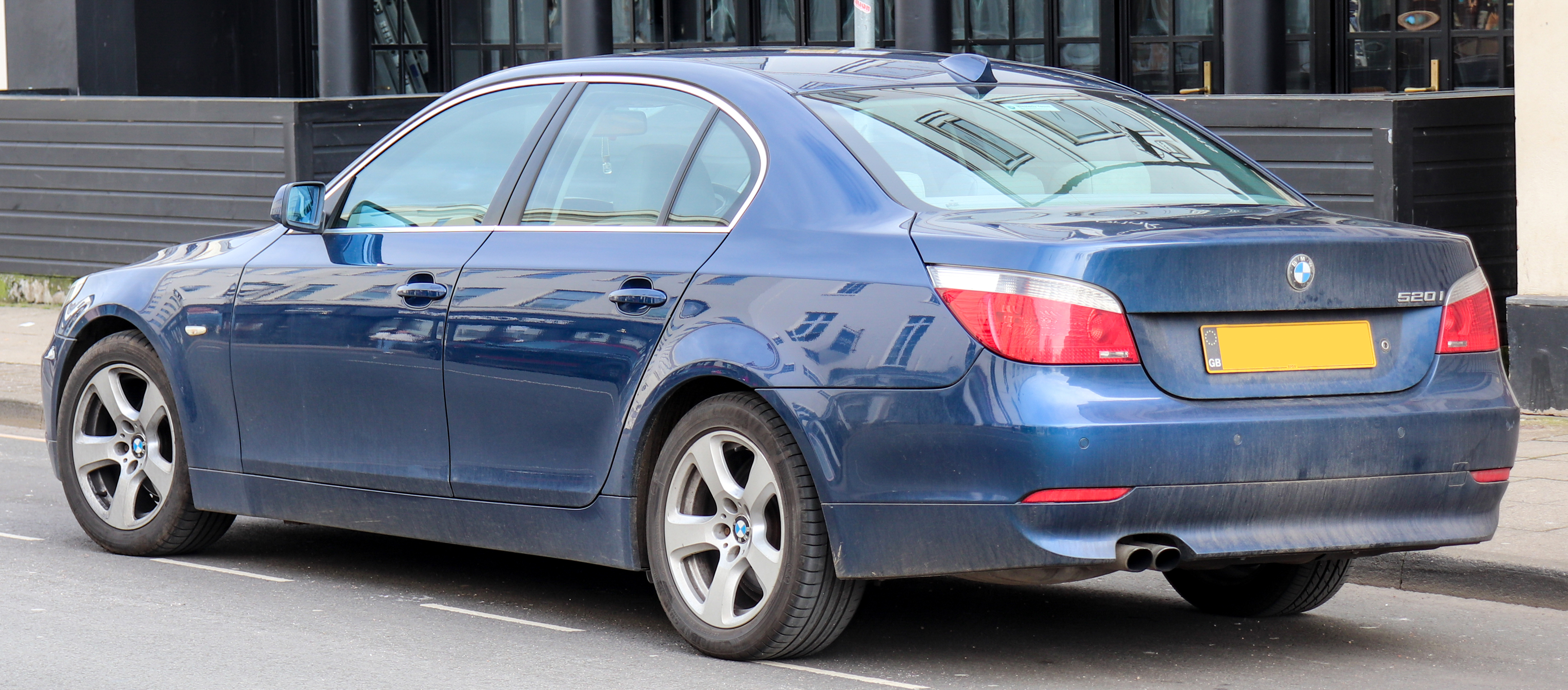
E60 rear

The E60/E61 is the fifth generation of the 5 Series, which was sold from 2003 to 2010. The body styles of the range are:

- 4-door sedan/saloon (E60 model code)
- 5-door estate/wagon (E61 model code, marketed as "Touring")

The E60 generation introduced various electronic features to the 5 Series, including iDrive, head-up display, active cruise control, active steering and voice control. The E60 also was the first 5 Series available with a turbocharged petrol engine, a 6-speed automatic transmission and regenerative braking. New safety features for the E60 included adaptive headlights, night vision, active headrests, Lane Departure Warning, and high intensity emergency brake lights. Unlike the three previous generations of 5 Series and the F10 successor, the E60/E61 centre console is not angled towards the driver.

The E60/E61 M5 was released in 2005 and was powered by the S85 V10 engine. It was sold in the sedan and wagon body styles, with most cars using a 7-speed automated manual transmission ("SMG III"). However, in the North American Markets, there was the option to buy the BMW M5 in a manual version.

== Sixth generation (F10/F11/F07/F18; 2010) ==
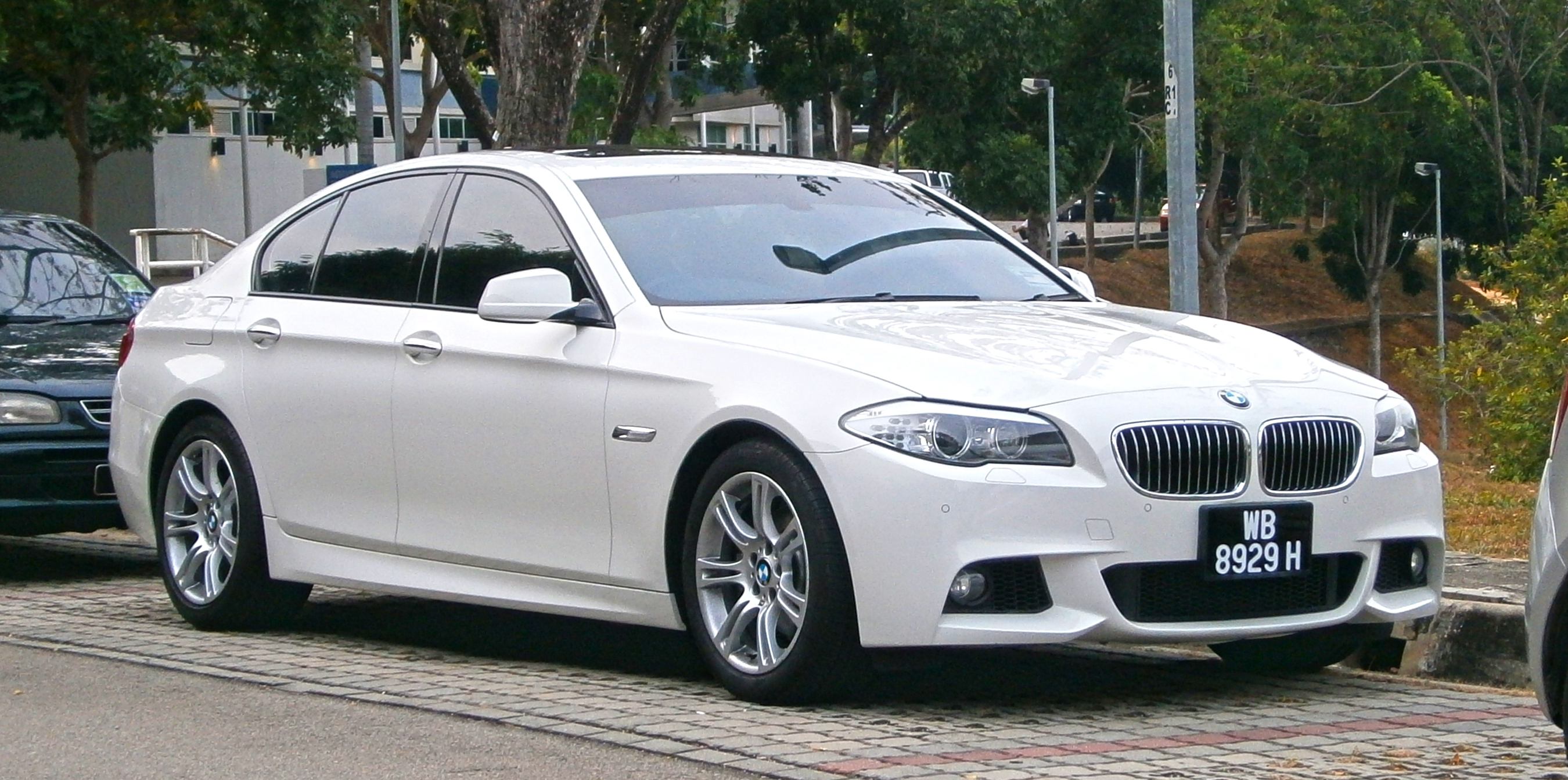
F10 front

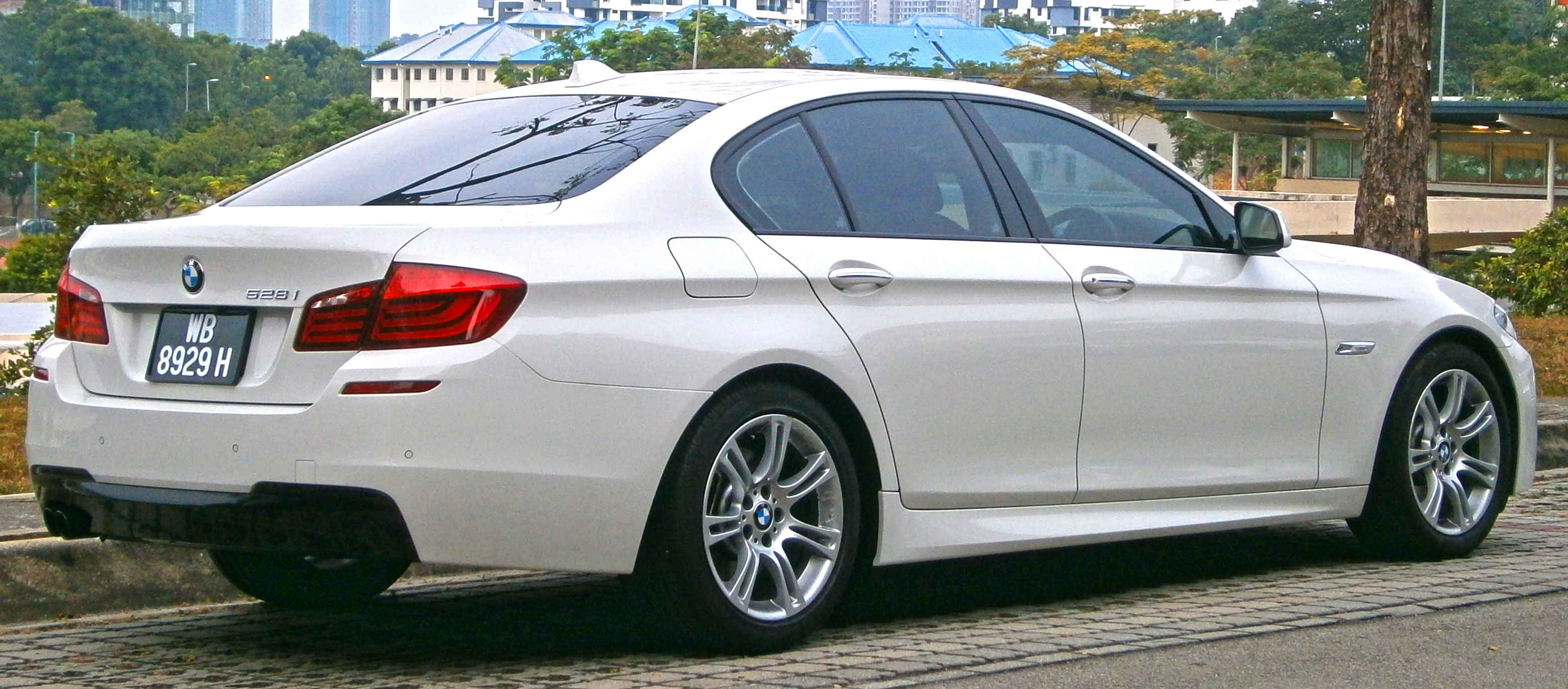
F10 rear

The BMW F10/F11/F07/F18 is the sixth generation of the BMW 5 Series, which was manufactured from 2010 to 2017. The body styles of the range are:

- 4-door sedan/saloon (F10)
- 5-door estate/wagon (F11, marketed as "Touring")
- 5-door fastback (F07, marketed as "Gran Turismo")
- 4-door long wheelbase sedan (F18, sold only in China and the Middle East)

The F07 Gran Turismo was the only 5 Series to date produced as a fastback. The F10 was also the first 5 Series to offer a hybrid drivetrain, a turbocharged V8 engine, an 8-speed automatic transmission, a dual-clutch transmission, active rear-wheel steering (called "Integral Active Steering"), electric power steering, double-wishbone front suspension, an LCD instrument cluster (called "Black Panel Display") and automatic parking (called "Parking Assistant").

The F10 M5 was powered by the S63 twin-turbo V8 engine with a 7-speed dual clutch transmission. It was the first M5 to use a turbocharged engine. Like the previous generation, the F10 M5 was sold in North America with a manual transmission.

== Seventh generation (G30/G31/G38; 2017) ==
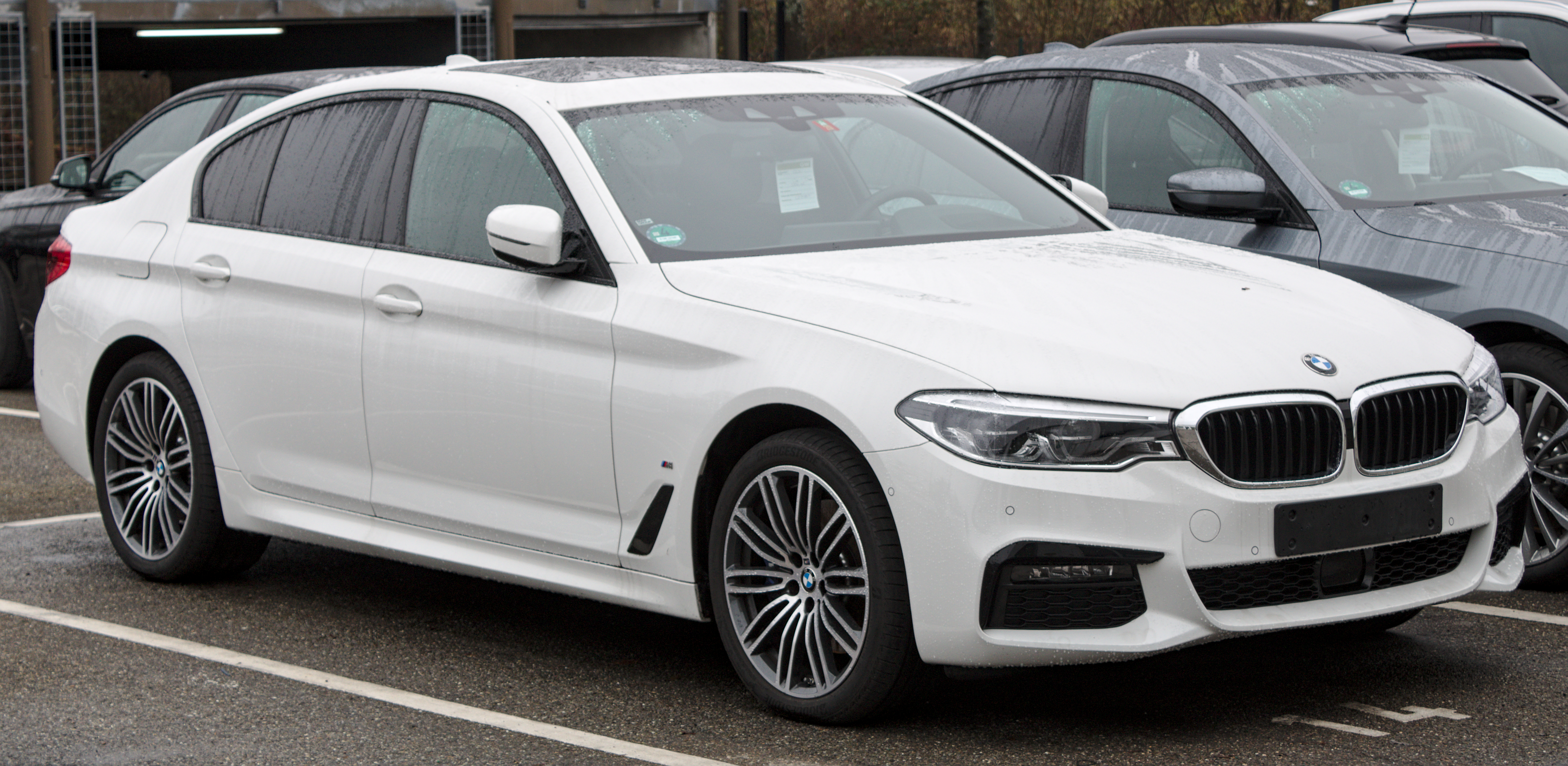
G30 front

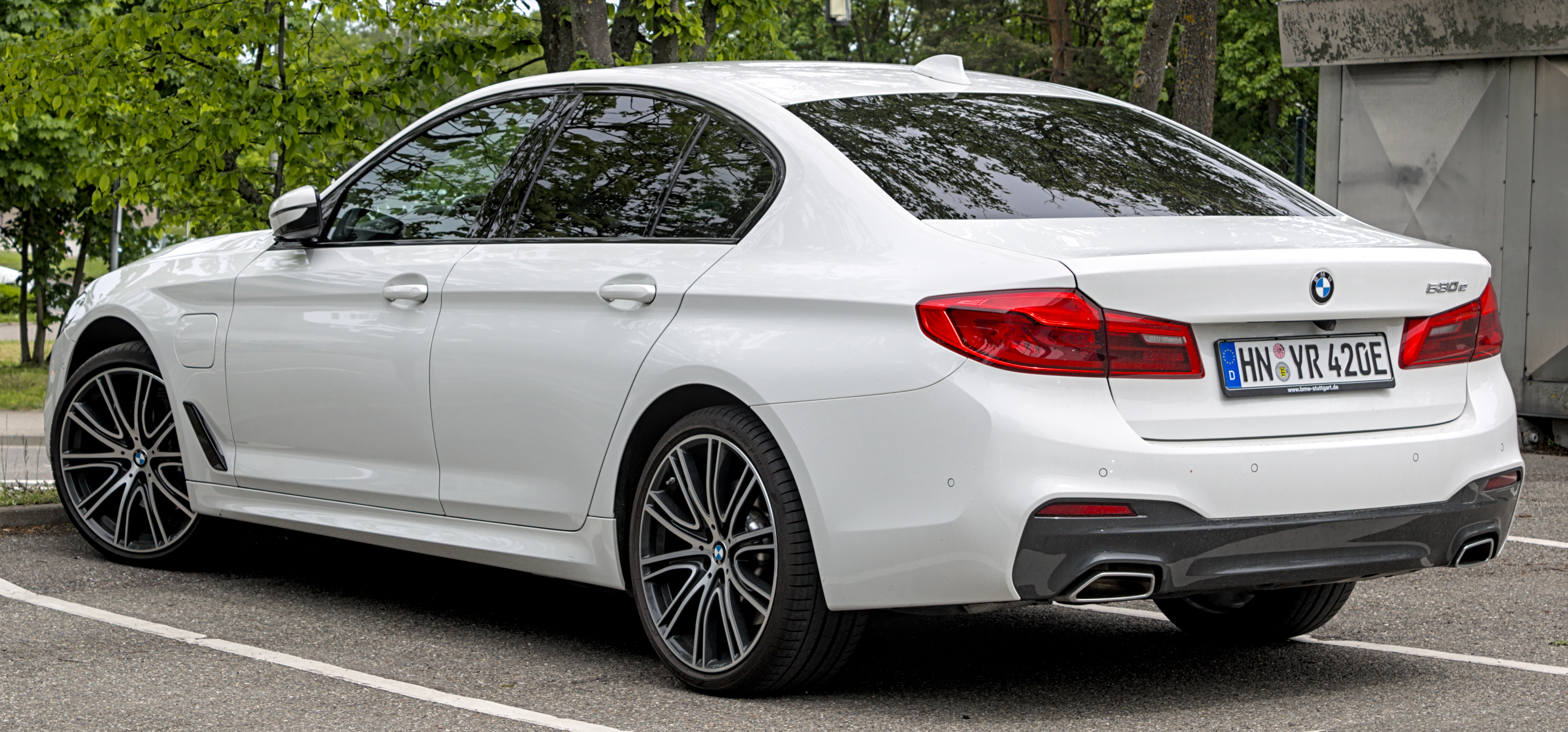
G30 rear

The BMW G30/G31/G38 is the seventh generation of the 5 Series. It was officially announced in October 2016, and sales began in February 2017.

Body styles included:

- 4-door sedan/saloon (G30)
- 5-door wagon/estate (G31)
- 4-door long-wheelbase saloon (G38)

The fastback 5 Series GT model from the previous generation is no longer offered, and was moved to the 6 Series range.

The G30 is based on the same modular platform as the 7 Series (G11). The G30 is the first 5 Series to be offered with a plug-in hybrid powertrain, the 530e iPerformance, which would have the advanced driver-assistance systems found in the 7 Series.

The F90 M5 is the M5 performance model for the G30 generation, and is the first M5 to employ an all-wheel drive powertrain. The X-Drive system allowed for the front differential to disconnect and provide a rear-wheel drive experience to the vehicle. It is powered by an upgraded version of the S63 twin-turbo V8 engine used in the previous generation F10 M5. The 5 Series received a facelift in 2020, retaining the same mechanics and engines.

== Eighth generation (G60/G61/G68; 2024) ==
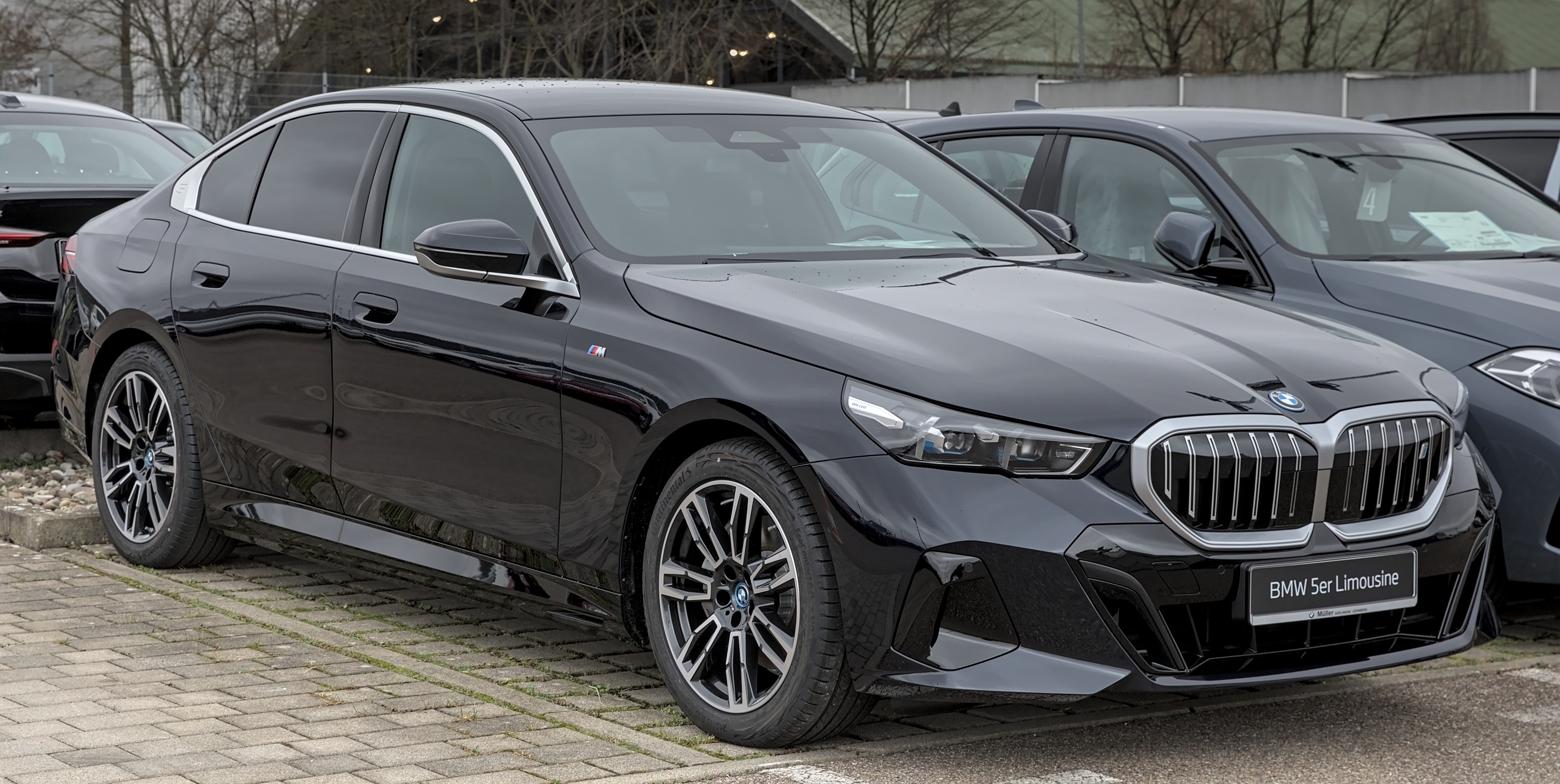
G60 front

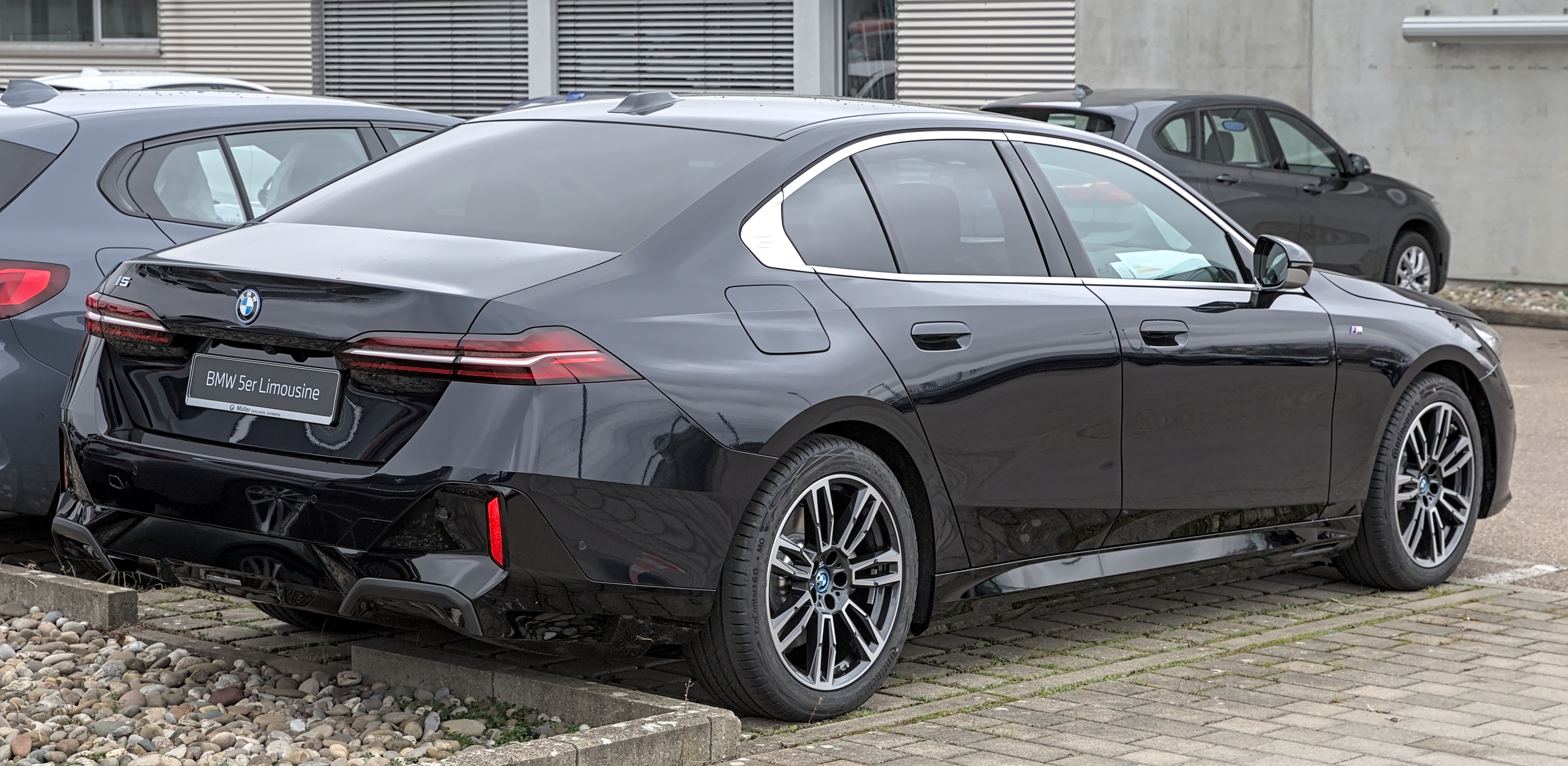
G60 rear

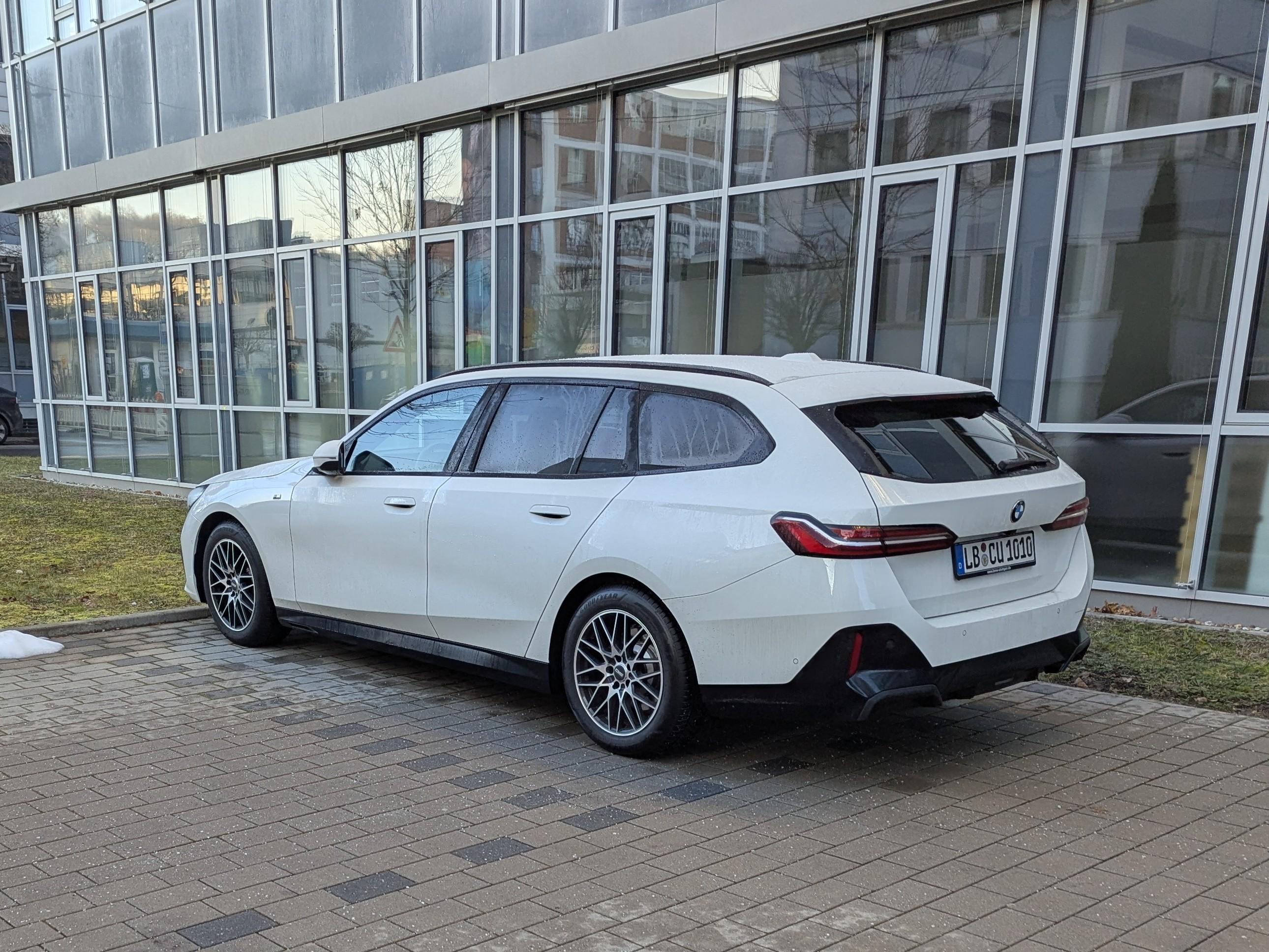
G60 Touring (Wagon) rear

The BMW G60/G61/G68 is the eighth generation of the 5 Series. It was revealed on May 24, 2023, and commenced production in the summer of 2023 at BMW's Dingolfing Plant, with first deliveries beginning around October 2023.

Body styles included:

- 4-door sedan/saloon (G60)
- 5-door wagon/estate (G61)
- 4-door long-wheelbase saloon (G68)

The fastback 6 Series Gran Turismo model has been discontinued. The 5-series will be offered in 530i, 540i, and 550e trims, with the 530i containing a 255-hp turbocharged 2.0-liter four-cylinder, offered with rear or all wheel drive. The 540i is standard with all-wheel drive as well as a 375-hp turbocharged inline-six engine. All variants—excluding the plug-in hybrid variants—feature a 48-volt mild hybrid system; this system consists of a 20 Ah lithium-ion and an electric motor/integrated starter-generator rated at 13 kW (17 hp) and 200 N⋅m (150 lbf⋅ft). The 5 Series is claimed to be powerful enough to hit 60 miles per hour in 4.5 seconds by BMW.

The eighth generation BMW 5 Series is also offered with a battery electric powertrain, dubbed the "i5". Three models are offered; the entry-level, rear-wheel-drive eDrive40 model, the mid-range, all-wheel-drive xDrive40, and the range topping M60 xDrive model.

== Production and sales ==
Year	Total production	% of total BMW production	US sales	China sales					Indonesia sales				
Year	Total production	% of total BMW production	US sales	5-series	PHEV	M5	i5	Total	5-series	PHEV	M5	i5	Total
1972	14,126	7.7%					—						
1973	49,899	24.8%					—						
1974	54,227	29.4%					—						
1975	80,746	35.6%					—						
1976	89,715	32.6%					—						
1977	85,318	29.6%					—						
1978	96,065	29.9%					—						
1979	105,115	31.4%					—						
1980	92,190	27.2%					—						
1981	87,332	25.0%					—						
1982	143,376	38.0%					—						
1983	129,978	30.8%					—						
1984	107,592	24.8%					—						
1985	111,000	25.2%					—						
1986	91,000	20.4%					—						
1987	83,300	18.1%					—						
1988	155,900	31.4%					—						
1989	202,300	38.7%					—						
1990	200,000	38.0%					—		1,005				1,005
1991	184,000	33.3%					—		821				821
1992	173,000	29.7%					—		217				217
1993	150,000	28.1%					—		413				413
1994	150,000	26.2%					—		715				715
1995	124,000	20.8%	22,637				—		437				437
1996	190,000	29.5%	22,775				—		559				559
1997	228,800	33.9%	-				—		1,077				1,077
1998	221,600	31.7%	-				—		202				202
1999	201,400	26.8%	38,218				—		79				79
2000	191,546	23.3%	39,703				—		223				223
2001	193,948	22.0%	40,005				—		376				376
2002	172,323	18.9%	40,842				—		199				199
2003	185,481	20.0%	46,964				—		159				159
2004	229,598	22.4%	45,584				—		471				471
2005	228,389	20.3%	52,722				—		348		4		352
2006	232,193	19.6%	56,756				—		116		0		116
2007	230,845	18.1%	54,142				—		211		1		212
2008	202,287	16.8%	45,915				—		152		0		152
2009	175,982	16.5%	40,109				—		208		0		208
2010	211,968	17.3%	39,488				—	42,076	354		0		354
2011	332,501	24.1%	51,491				—		450		0		450
2012	359,016	23.3%	56,798				—		600		27		627
2013	366,992	22.2%	56,863				—		588		24		612
2014	373,053	20.6%	52,704				—	78,827	490		4		494
2015	347,096	18.2%	44,162				—	147,200	542		0		542
2016	331,410	16.5%	32,408				—	154,795	333		1		334
2017	347,313	16.6%	40,658				—	120,320	359		1		360
2018	381,749	18.0%	43,937				—	133,110	419		0		419
2019	353,268	16.2%	38,709				—	135,897	414		1		415
2020*	322,457	15.9%	26,875				—	146,658	258	3	2		263
2021*	326,212	14.7%	24,523				—	172,813	243	1	1		245
2022*	315,590	15.0%	20,857				—	161,659	280	0	1		281
2023*	273,877	12.3%	20,667	143,993	8,436	100	—	136,745	411	0	0		411
2024*	250,674	11.4%	25,316	92,227	453	18	8,264		358	2	0	117	477
2025			27,109	124,361	—	110	6,886		127	1	0	123	251

* 5 Series and 6 Series combined

== See also ==
- List of BMW vehicles
