= BMW 6 Series (E24) =

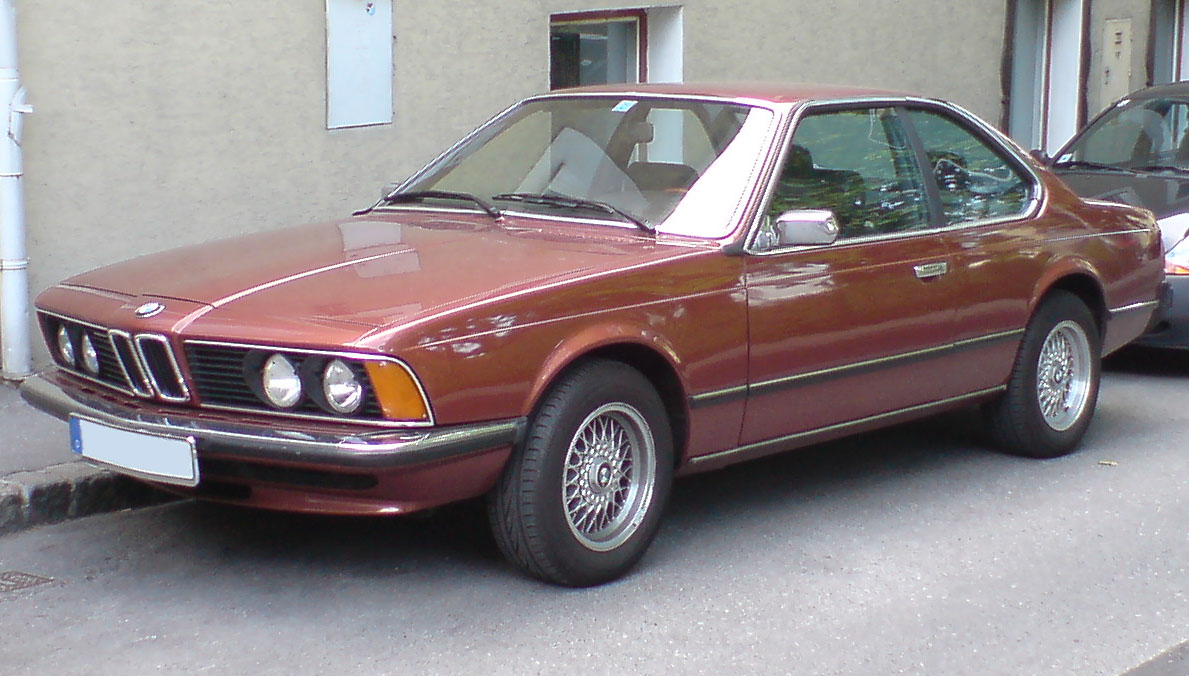

Overview
- Manufacturer: BMW
- Model code: E24
- Production: January 1976 – April 1989; 86,216 produced
- Assembly: West Germany: Karmann (1976–1977); West Germany: Dingolfing (1977–1989)
- Designer: Paul Bracq

Body and chassis
- Class: Grand tourer
- Body style: 2-door coupé
- Layout: Front-engine, rear-wheel-drive

Powertrain
- Engine: Petrol: 2.8 L M30B28 I6; 3.0 L M30B30 I6; 3.2 L M30B32 I6; 3.4 L M30B34/M30B35 I6; 3.5 L M90 I6; 3.5 L M88/S38 DOHC I6

Dimensions
- Wheelbase: 2,630 mm (103.5 in)
- Length: 4,755 mm (187.2 in); US: 4,923 mm (193.8 in)
- Width: 1,725 mm (67.9 in)
- Height: 1,365 mm (53.7 in)
- Curb weight: 1,450–1,619 kg (3,197–3,569 lb)

Chronology
- Predecessor: BMW E9
- Successor: BMW 6 Series (E63)

The BMW E24 is the first generation of BMW 6 Series range of grand tourer cars, which was produced from January 1976 to 1989 and replaced the BMW E9 coupé.

The E24 was produced solely in a 2-door coupé body style. All models used petrol straight-six engines, with the majority (aside from the M635CSi/M6 model) using a version of the BMW M30 engine family. The E24 shared many parts with the E12 5 series, and in 1982 was updated with parts from the newly released E28 5 series.

The M635CSi is the first of the BMW M6 model line and is powered by the M88/3 straight-six engine. In North America, the vehicle is badged as "M6" and uses the less powerful BMW S38 engine.

The eventual successor to the nameplate, the E63 6 Series, was released in 2004 after a 16-year hiatus. Although the E31 8 Series was introduced as production of the E24 was ending, the 8 Series is considered a separate model line and therefore not a successor to the E24.

== Development and production ==
The E24 was designed by Paul Bracq. Unlike its E9 predecessor, the body of the E24 has a B pillar. The initial proposal for the E24 was based on a BMW E9 3.0 CS with an increased height, in order to make it easier for customers to enter and exit the vehicle. However, Bob Lutz rejected the proposal, eventually leading to the shape of the E24 in its production form.

Production of the 633CSi started in January 1976 with the carburetted 630CS following in February 1976. A total of 86,216 cars were built prior to production ending in April 1989.

Originally the bodies were manufactured by Karmann, but production was later taken in-house to the BMW Group Plant Dingolfing. Early series one E24s in original condition are now quite rare, particularly Karmann assembled cars (look for the Karmann build plate in the left door frame) produced before August 1977.

== Design ==
Suspension and steering

Front suspension consists of MacPherson struts and the rear suspension is independent semi-trailing arms. In 1982, the front suspension was upgraded to include twin-pivot lower control arms and the geometry of the rear suspension was revised.

The steering uses a recirculating ball system with power assistance.

Engines

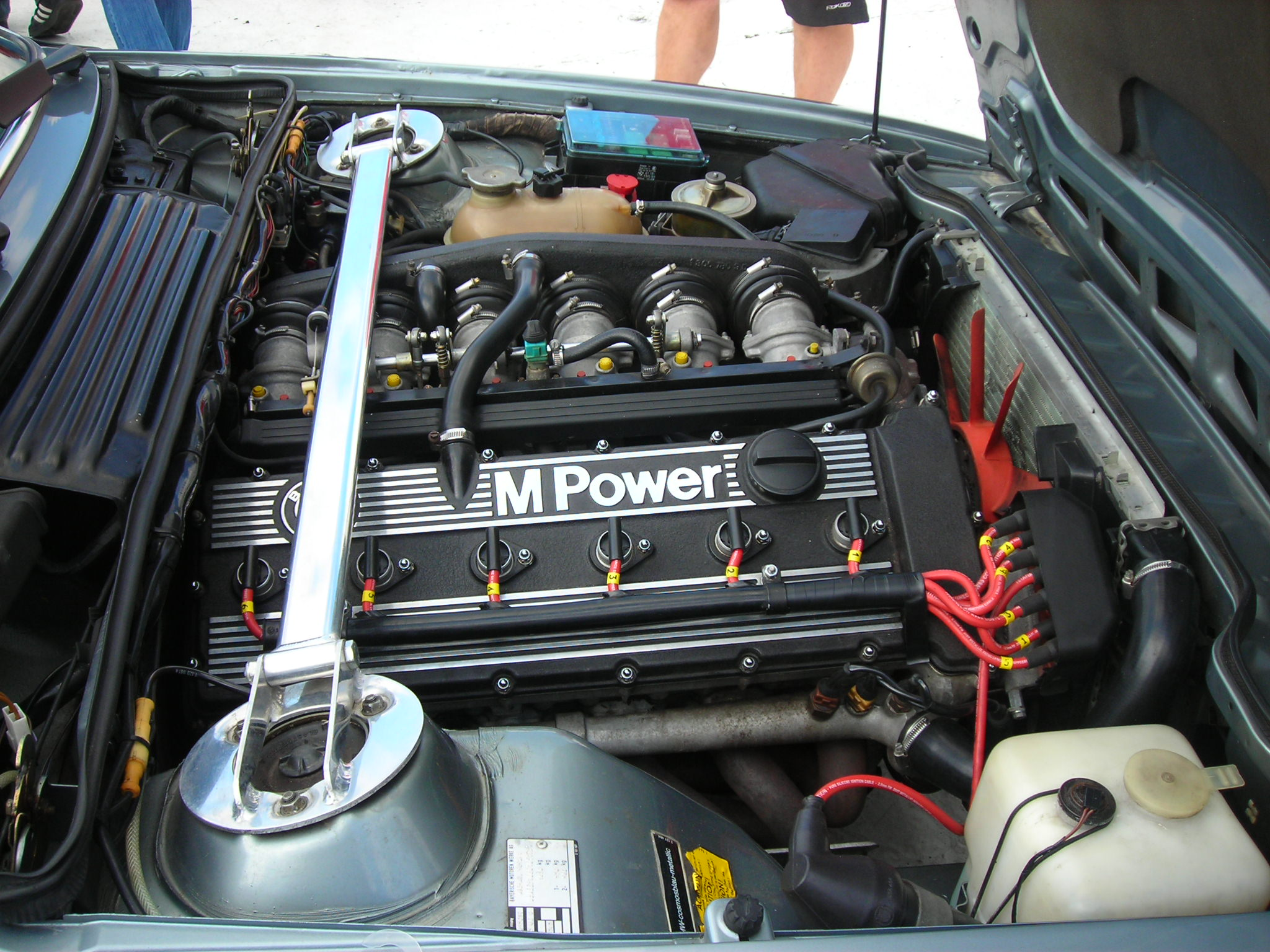
BMW M88/3 engine used in the M635CSi model

Figures in the upper table are for European specification models. The second half of the table covers US (and Canadian, often also as sold in Japan) market specifications.

Model	Years	Engine	Displacement	Power	Torque	Cat.
628CSi	1979–1987	M30B28; SOHC I6	2788 cc	135 kW (184 PS; 181 hp) at 5,800 rpm	235 N⋅m (173 lb⋅ft) at 4,200 rpm	–
630CS	1976–1979	M30B30V; SOHC I6	2986 cc	136 kW (185 PS; 182 hp) at 5,800 rpm	255 N⋅m (188 lb⋅ft) at 3,500 rpm	–
633CSi	1976–1979	M30B32; SOHC I6	3210 cc	147 kW (200 PS; 197 hp) at 5,500 rpm	285 N⋅m (210 lb⋅ft) at 4,300 rpm	–
633CSi	1979–1984	M30B32; SOHC I6	3210 cc	145 kW (197 PS; 194 hp) at 5,500 rpm	280 N⋅m (207 lb⋅ft) at 4,250 rpm	–
635CSi	1978–1982	M90; SOHC I6	3453 cc	160 kW (218 PS; 215 hp) at 5,200 rpm	304 N⋅m (224 lb⋅ft) at 4,000 rpm	–
635CSi	1982–1987	M30B34; SOHC I6	3430 cc	160 kW (218 PS; 215 hp) at 5,500 rpm	310 N⋅m (229 lb⋅ft) at 4,000 rpm	–
635CSi	1985–1987	M30B34; SOHC I6	3430 cc	136 kW (185 PS; 182 hp) at 5,400 rpm	290 N⋅m (214 lb⋅ft) at 4,000 rpm	●
635CSi	1987–1989	M30B35; SOHC I6	3430 cc	162 kW (220 PS; 217 hp) at 5,700 rpm	310 N⋅m (229 lb⋅ft) at 4,000 rpm	–
635CSi	1987–1989	M30B35; SOHC I6	3430 cc	155 kW (211 PS; 208 hp) at 5,700 rpm	305 N⋅m (225 lb⋅ft) at 4,000 rpm	●
M635CSi	1984–1989	M88/3; DOHC I6	3453 cc	210 kW (286 PS; 282 hp) at 6,500 rpm	340 N⋅m (251 lb⋅ft) at 4,500 rpm	–
M635CSi	1986–1989	S38B35; DOHC I6	3453 cc	191 kW (260 PS; 256 hp) at 6,500 rpm	330 N⋅m (243 lb⋅ft) at 4,500 rpm	●
US market specifications
Model	Model years	Engine	Displacement	Power	Torque	Cat.
630CSi	1977–1978	M30B30; SOHC I6	2986 cc	131 kW (176 hp) at 5,500 rpm	251 N⋅m (185 lb⋅ft) at 4,500 rpm	●
633CSi	1978–1979	M30B32; SOHC I6	3210 cc	132 kW (177 hp) at 5,500 rpm	266 N⋅m (196 lb⋅ft) at 4,000 rpm	●
633CSi	1980–1981	M30B32; SOHC I6	3210 cc	130 kW (174 hp) at 5,200 rpm	255 N⋅m (188 lb⋅ft) at 4,200 rpm	●
633CSi	1982–1984	M30B32; SOHC I6	3210 cc	135 kW (181 hp) at 6,000 rpm	264 N⋅m (195 lb⋅ft) at 4,000 rpm	●
635CSi; L6	1985–1987; 1987 (L6)	M30B34; SOHC I6	3430 cc	136 kW (182 hp) at 5,400 rpm	290 N⋅m (214 lb⋅ft) at 4,000 rpm	●
635CSi; L6	1988–1989	M30B35; SOHC I6	3430 cc	155 kW (208 hp) at 5,700 rpm	305 N⋅m (225 lb⋅ft) at 4,000 rpm	●
M6	1987–1989*	S38B35; DOHC I6	3453 cc	191 kW (256 hp) at 6,500 rpm	329 N⋅m (243 lb⋅ft) at 4,500 rpm	●

Transmissions

Initially, the E24 was available with a 4-speed manual transmission (Getrag 262), a 5-speed manual transmission (Getrag 265), or a 3-speed automatic transmission (ZF 3HP22).

In 1983 the automatic transmission was upgraded to a 4-speed ZF 4HP22.

== M635CSi / M6 model ==
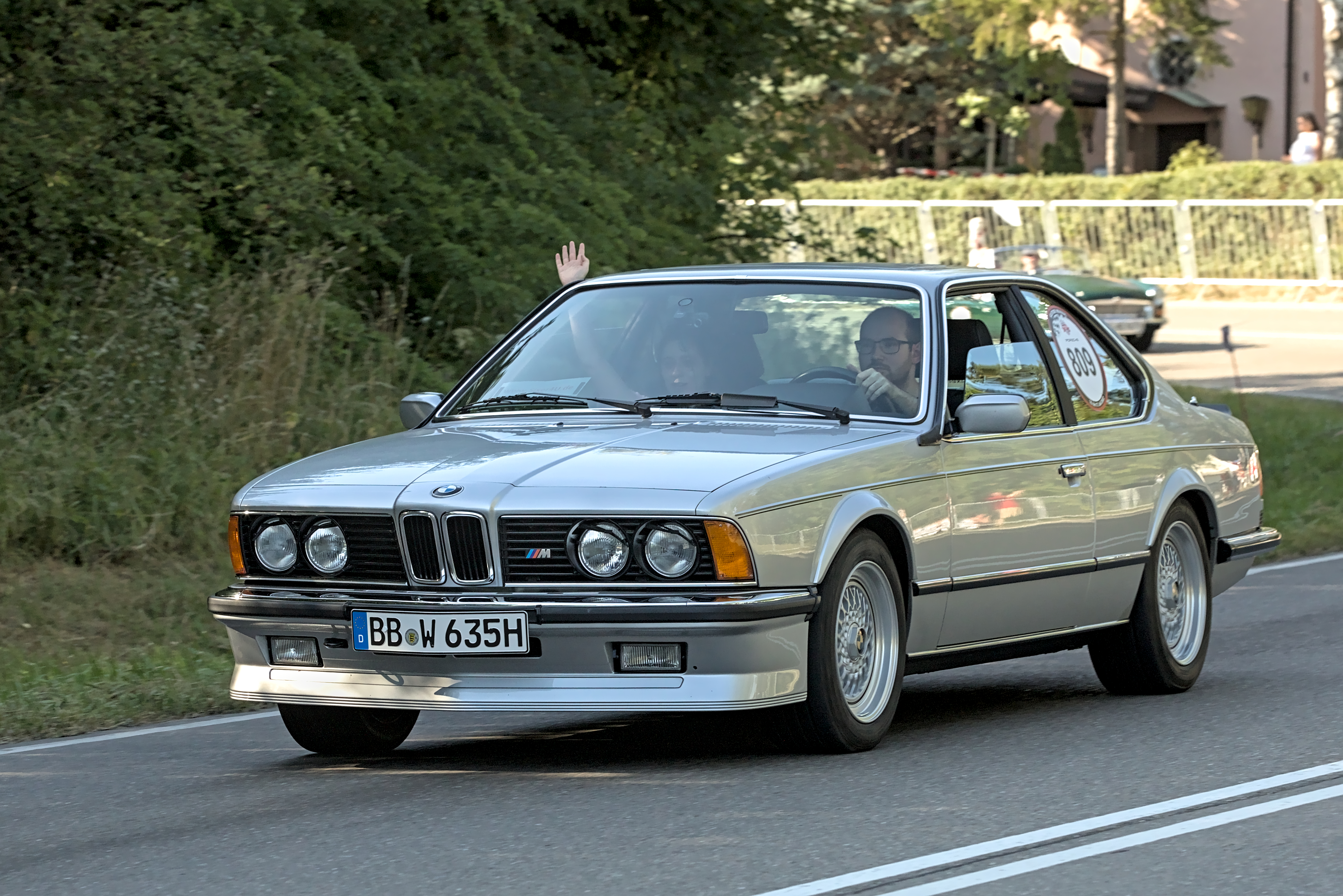
European-spec M635CSi model

The M635CSi model, introduced at the Frankfurt Motor Show in 1983, is the first in the line of M6 models. In 1987, the equivalent model for the North American (U.S. and Canada) market was introduced and badged simply 'M6'.

The M635CSi is powered by a 210 kW (286 PS) version of the BMW M88/3 straight-six engine. The North American M6 vehicle is powered by the detuned 191 kW (256 hp; 260 PS) version of the BMW S38 straight-six engine, which has a lower compression ratio and uses a catalytic converter.

Over its production run from 1983 through 1989, 5,855 M635CSi/M6 cars were built, 1,767 of which were for the North American market, and 524 right hand drive cars for the United Kingdom.

== Yearly changes ==
=== 1976 ===
The new 6 Series coupé, using the model code E24, was introduced to the press in March 1976, suggesting production commenced in 1975.

Initially there were two models available: 630 CS (Coupé Sports) and 633 CSI (Coupé Sports Injected). Karmann constructed the 6 series coupé, as well as the earlier BMW coupés. There were a total of 1665 units of the 630 CS (plus 410 630 CSi, bound for the United States) and 2858 units of the 633 CSi (this number also includes right-hand drive cars) produced in the first year, amongst a total of 4,933 E24s produced for the year.

=== 1977 ===
Production of E24 continued in 1977 at Karmann as a complete assembly until August, when only the steel body shell was made by Karmann and then shipped to BMW's plant in Dingolfing for assembly.

Karmann-bodied cars are now rare and highly collectable, particularly in original condition in early factory colours such as orange (028 Phönix), green (079 Mintgrün), and yellow (070 Golf) - the latter very rare.

=== 1978 ===
In July 1978, the more powerful 635CSi variant was introduced. The 635CSi featured a close-ratio 5-speed gearbox and a single piece black rear spoiler. The M90 engine was a single overhead cam version of the M1's M88 engine, its bigger bore and shorter stroke resulted in 160 kW (218 PS; 215 hp) and increased torque. The aerodynamic changes reduced uplift at high speeds by almost 15 percent over the other E24 models.

=== 1979 ===
In 1979 the carburetted 630CS was replaced with the 628CSi; this car had a fuel-injected 2.8-litre engine taken from the E12 528i. An anti-lock braking system became available as an option.

=== 1980 ===
In 1980, the fuel-injection systems changed from Bosch L-jetronic to Bosch Motronic. The 635CSi central locking system could now be operated from the passenger door and trunk.

=== 1982 facelift ===
In 1982 (1983 model year in the US), the E24 was updated with parts from E28 5 Series, resulting changes to exterior styling, engines, chassis, suspension, electronics and the interior. The struts in the new front suspension were double-linked ones, making the car less likely to dip under hard braking. The new rear axle was nearly identical to the trailing arm layout of the E28 528i, with a new pitman arm to control camber changes. Meanwhile, the ventilated rear discs had proven a needless complication and were replaced with solid ones. The rust protection was improved considerably along with the facelift.

The 635CSi engine was updated to the 3,430 cc (209 cu in) M30B34, which used a smaller bore and longer stroke than the previous 3,453 cc (211 cu in) M90 engine. The 635CSi became available with a wide-ratio 5-speed manual or a 4-speed automatic transmission.

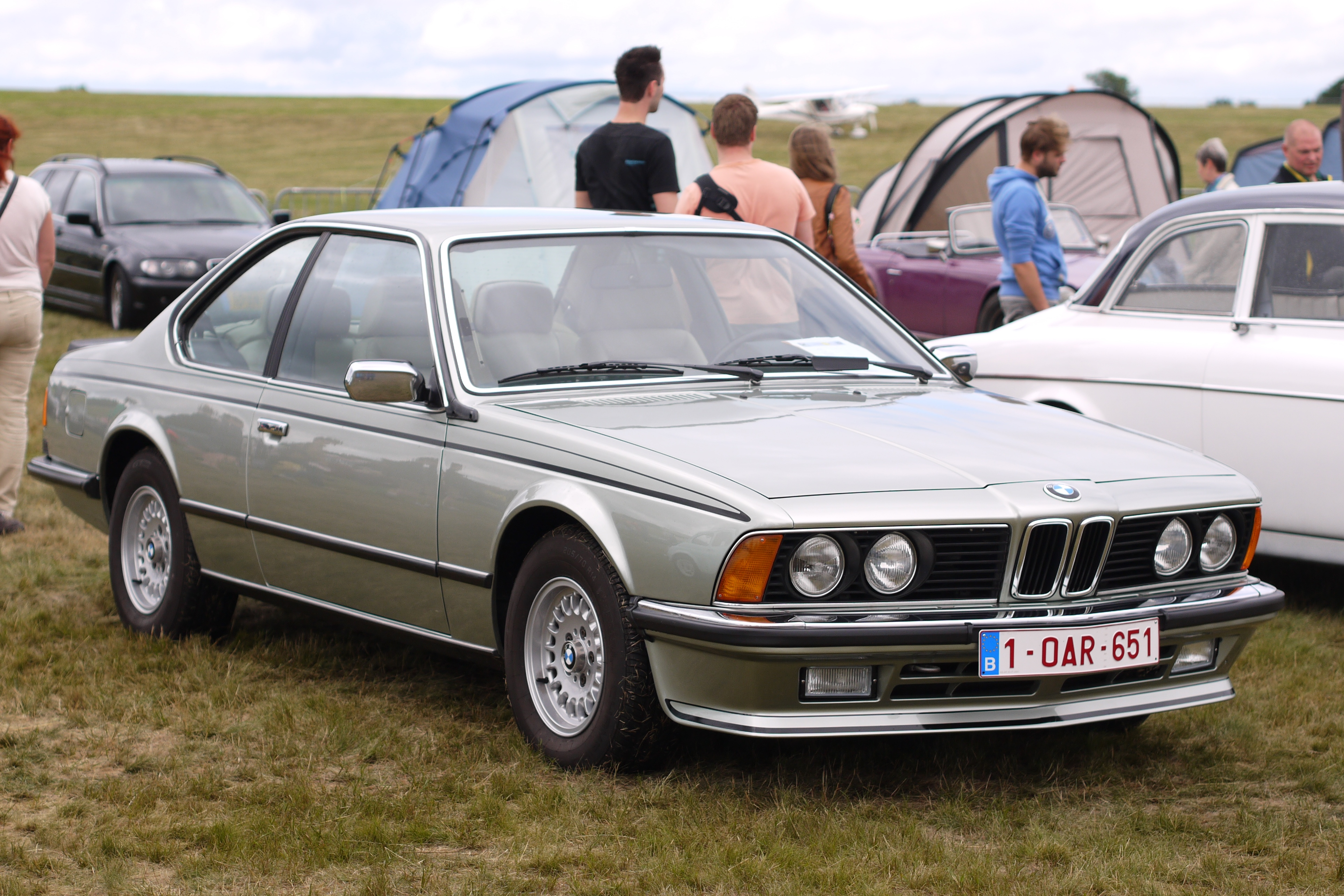
Post-facelift model (front)

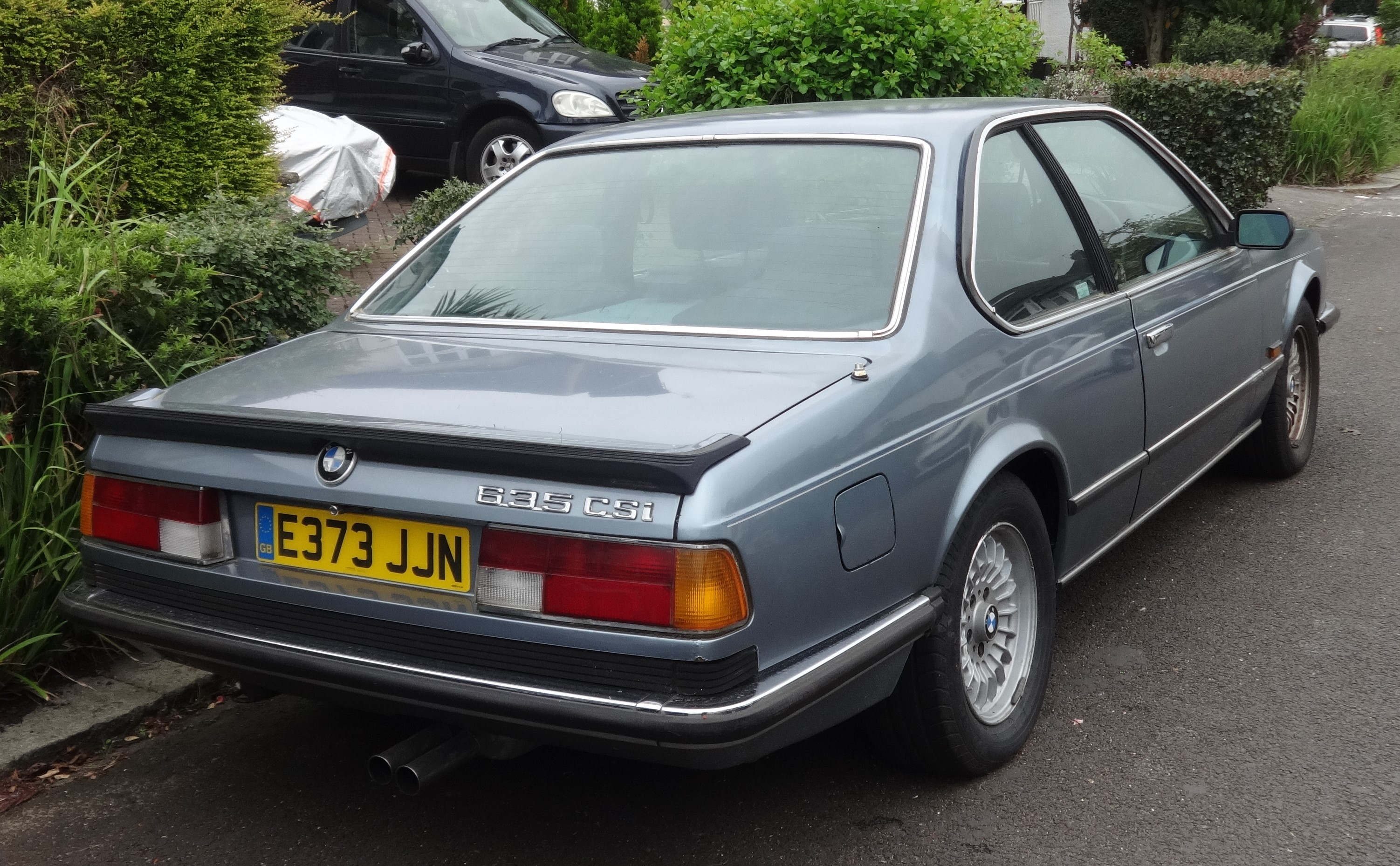
Post-facelift model (rear)

=== 1987 ===
E24s produced after June 1987 were fitted with ellipsoid headlamps, as per the recently introduced E32 7 Series. The front and rear bumpers and spoilers were redesigned to use a single design worldwide (prior to this, models sold in North America used a different design from the rest of the world).

The 635CSi engine was updated to the higher compression M30B35, which resulted in a power increase of 19 kW (25 hp) for engines with catalytic converters.

== North American and Japanese models ==
The extended bumpers required by U.S. crash legislation resulted in U.S. models having an increase in length of approximately 180 mm (7.1 in) to 4,923 mm (193.8 in). Although other markets offered multiple E24 models, in North America only one model was available at any given time (aside from the M6).

=== 630CSi ===
The 6 series was released in the US as the 630CSi in March 1977, with the 633CSi replacing it during the 1978 model year. The US market version received larger bumpers and side marker lights, as required by federal legislation. The 630CSi is powered by a fuel-injected version of the 630CS engine. This 3.0 litre engine produces 176 hp (131 kW) and 185 lb⋅ft (251 N⋅m).

=== 633CSi ===
The 633CSi arrived in USA in September 1977 (for the 1978 model year), replacing the original 630. In United States/Japan specification, the 633CSi was powered by a 135 kW (181 hp) version of the M30B32 engine. Output later dropped to 130 kW (174 hp).

In September 1980 (1981 model year), the manual transmission for US cars was upgraded from a 4-speed to a 5-speed. A 3-speed automatic transmission was optional.

In September 1982, North American and Japanese market models received a major facelift, as per the models sold in the rest of the world.

=== 635CSi ===
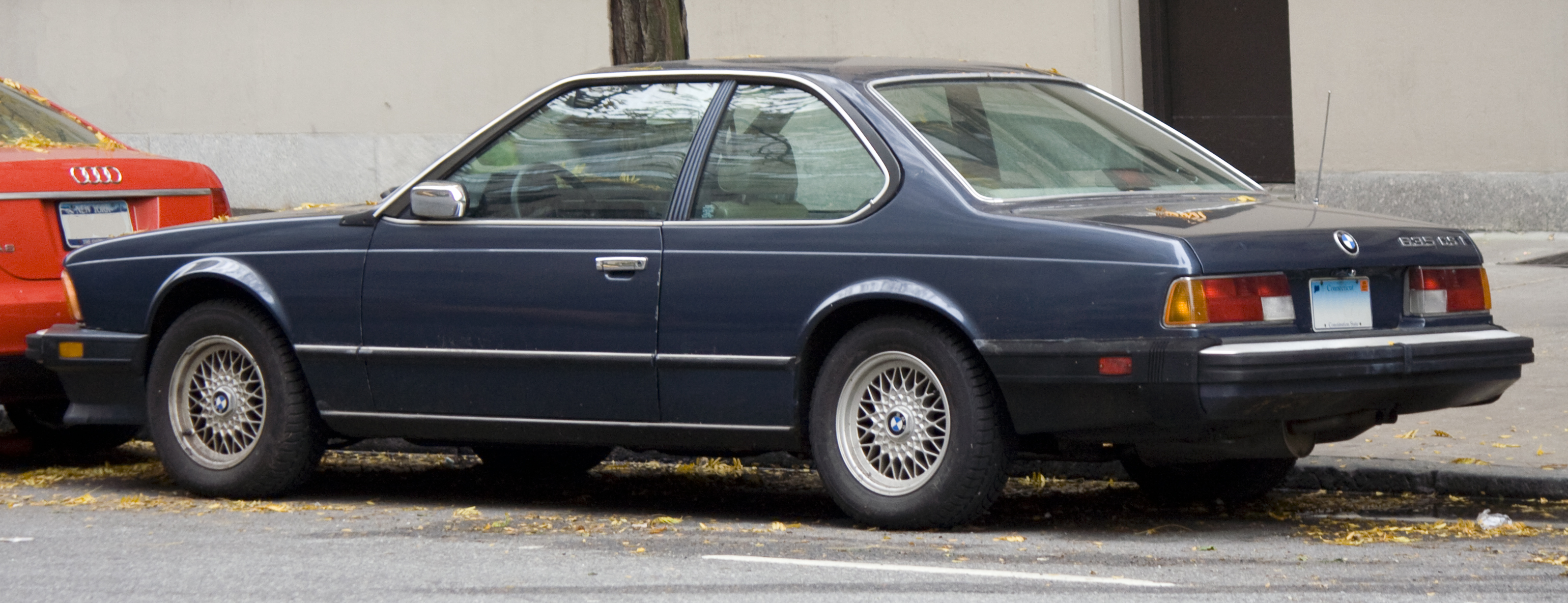
635CSi (U.S. version)

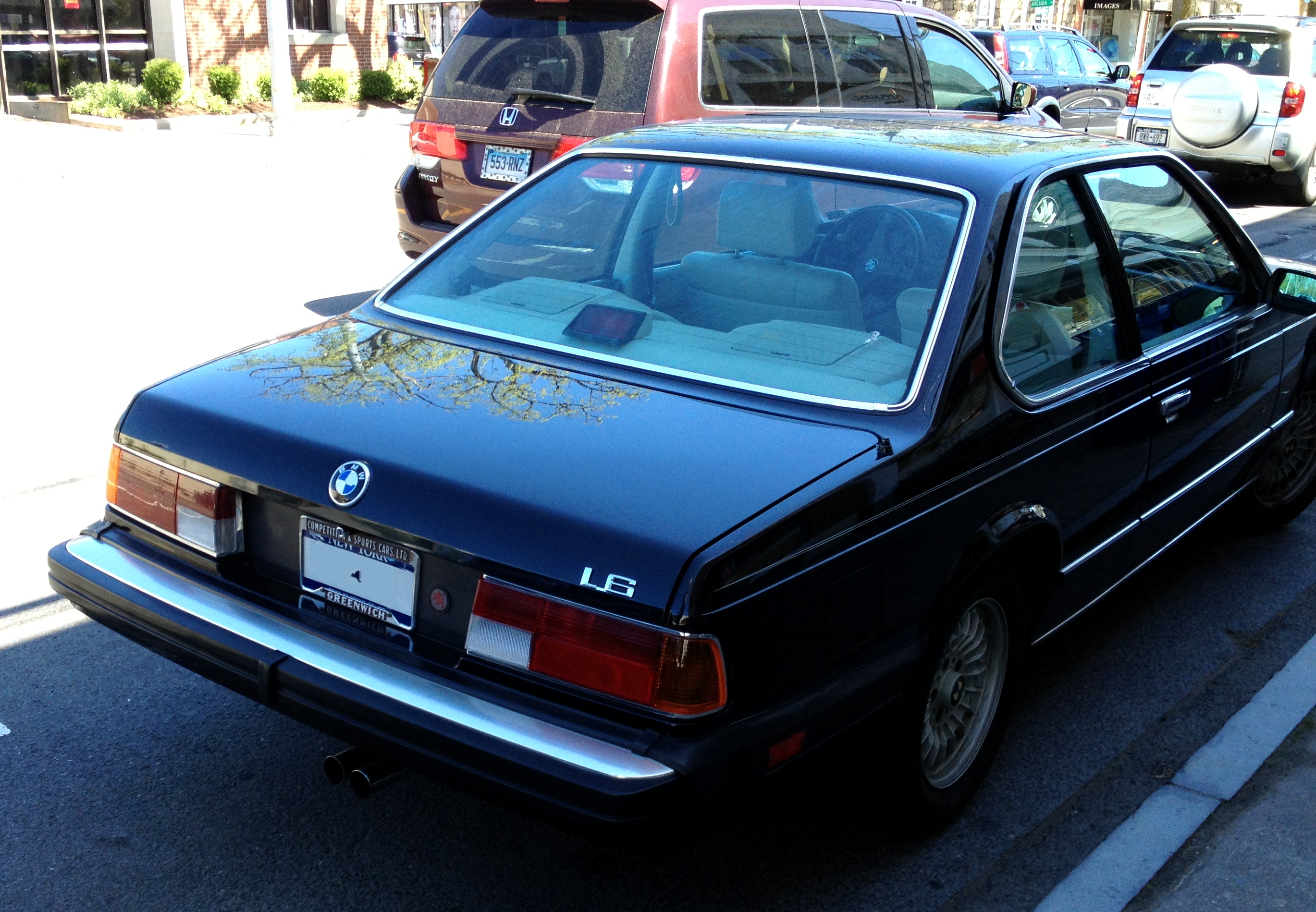
The rear of a BMW L6

In November 1984, for the 1985 model year, the 633CSi was replaced by the 635CSi for the North American Market. This model uses the M30B34 engine, which produces 182 hp (136 kW) and 214 lb⋅ft (290 N⋅m) at 4,000 rpm. An L6 "luxury edition" version of the 635CSi was available in North America for the 1987 model year. The L6 featured leather headliner and trim and an automatic gearbox.

In 1988 the engine was upgraded to the M30B35. This engine has a capacity of 3.4 Litres (despite the model code and the "3.5" inscribed on the intake manifold) and produces 155 kW (208 hp) and 305 N⋅m (225 lbf⋅ft) torque. This upgraded engine resulted in catalytic converter equipped United States models offering similar performance to European models. Self-leveling rear suspension was added to the 635CSi and M6 features list.

=== M6 ===
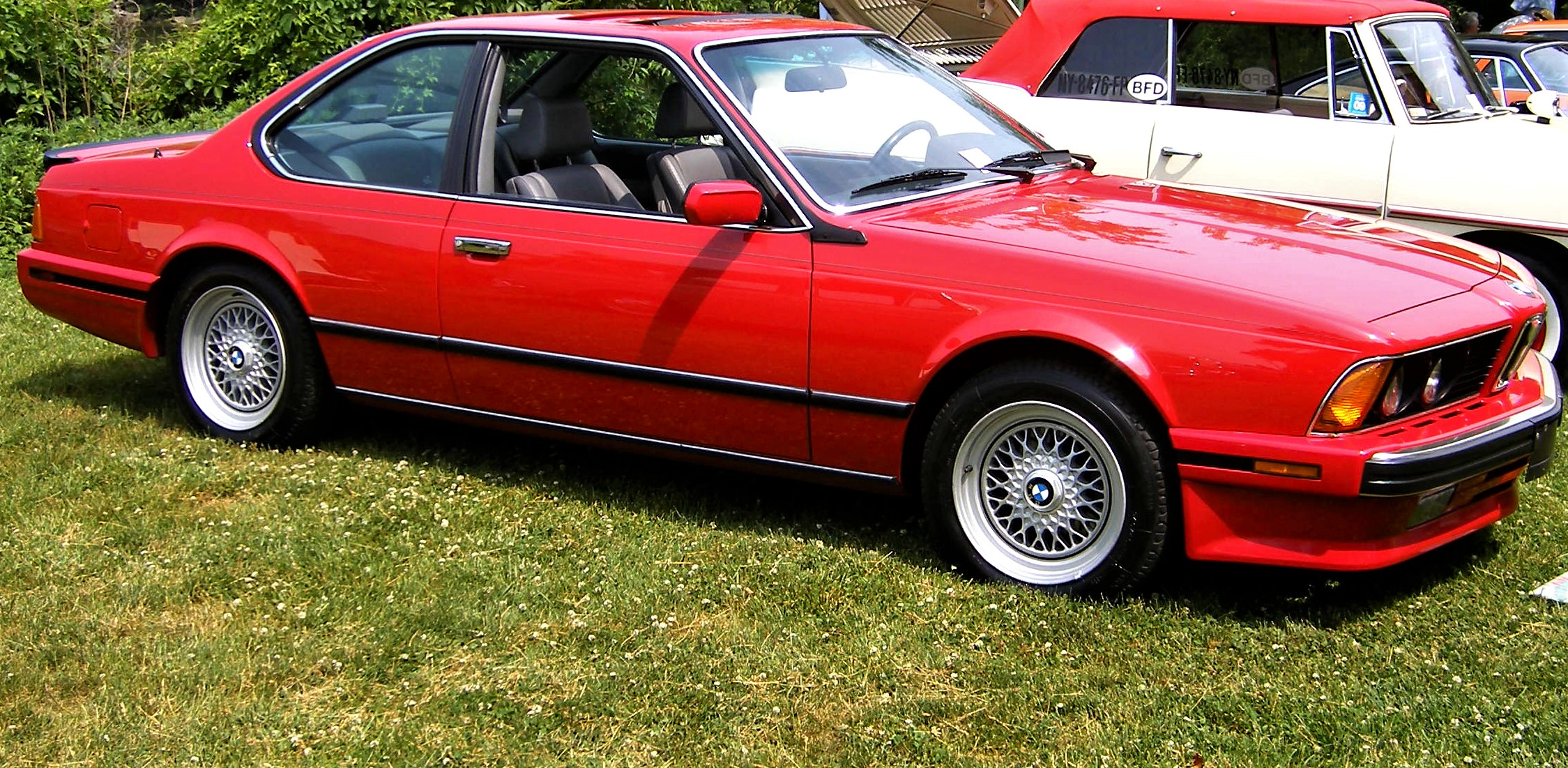
M6 (U.S. version)

In 1987, North America and Japan received their equivalent of the M635CSi, called simply the M6. The main difference between the M6 and its European counterpart, is that the S38 engine is used instead of the M88. Compared with the M88, the S38 has a catalytic converter, the compression ratio reduced to 9.8:1, a double row timing chain, a shorter camshaft duration and a simplified exhaust manifold. The power output for the North American E24 M6 is 256 hp (191 kW), which is 22 kW (30 hp) less than the European M635CSi.

Standard equipment on the United States market M6 cars included many features which were optional on the European cars, including heated power seats, self-leveling rear suspension, beverage chiller (cooled by an air-conditioning system) between the rear seats, air-conditioning vents for rear seat occupants, sunshade for rear occupants and an 8-speaker premium sound system.

== Motorsport ==
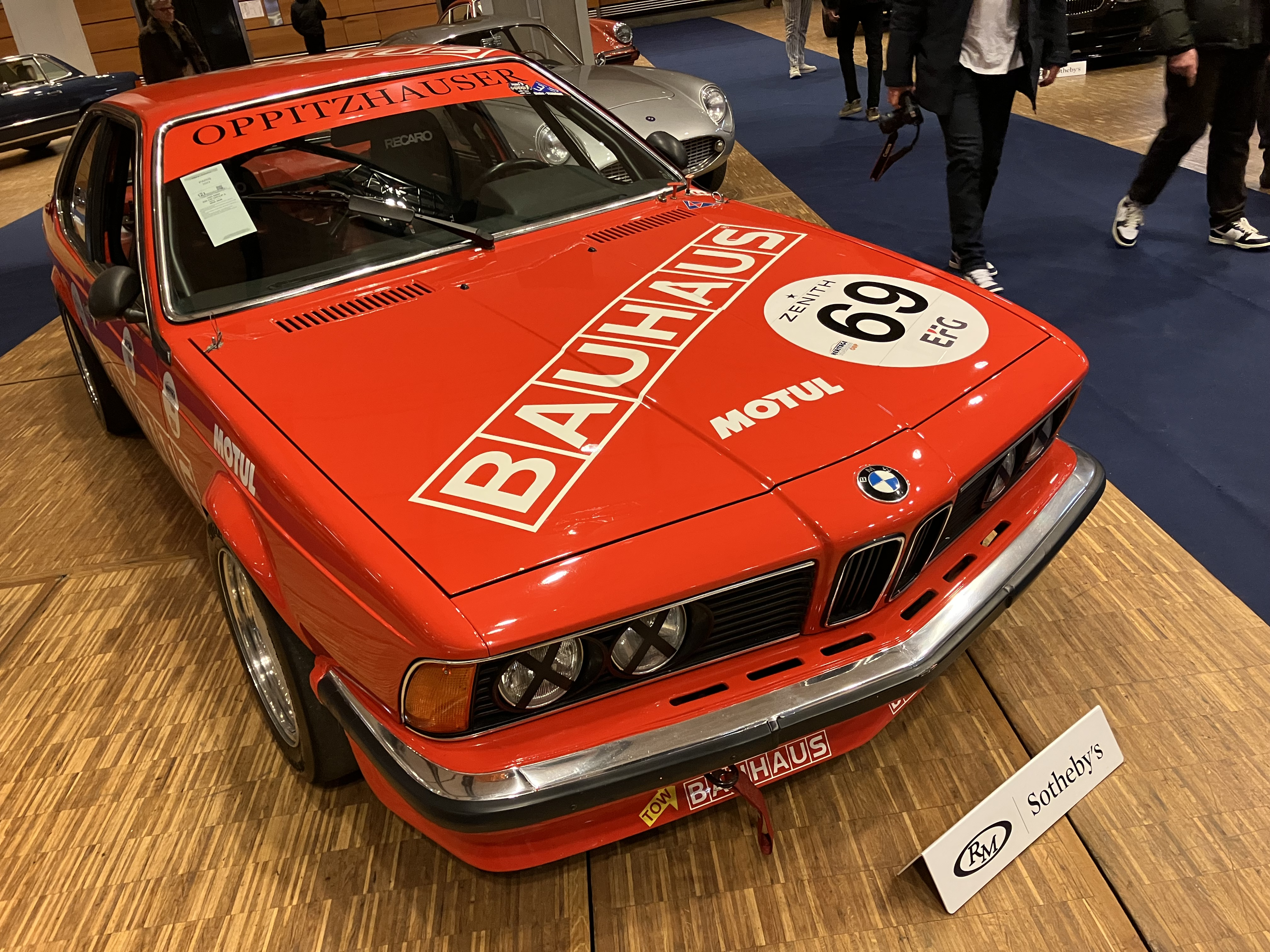
1983 BMW 635 CSi Group A

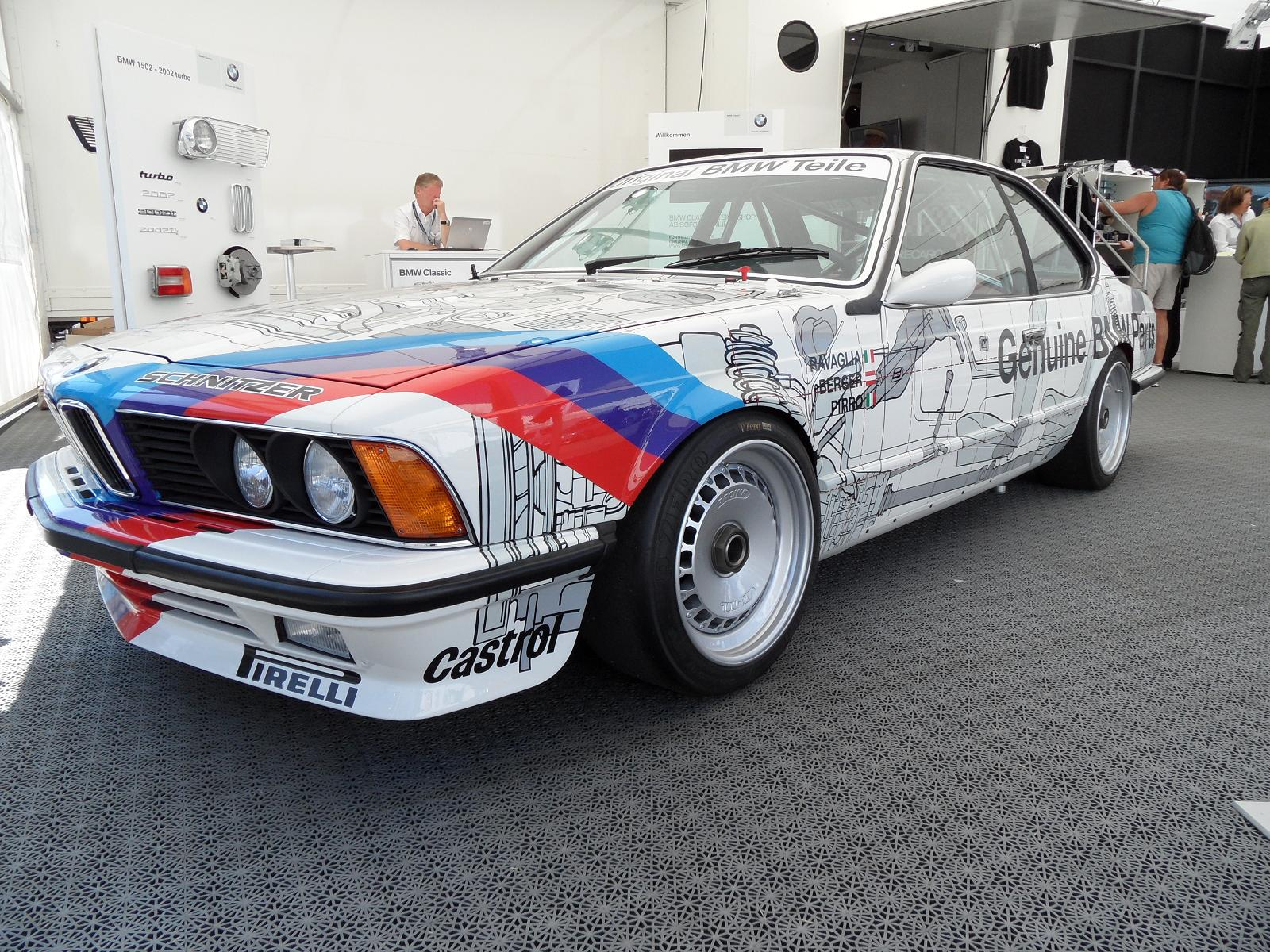
A 1986 BMW 635CSi which finished 3rd at that year's 24 Hours of Spa

In 1982, the European Touring Car Championship transitioned to Group A regulations, prompting BMW to move from the 3.0 CSL to the 635 CSi. BMW Motorsport produced approximately 50 competition chassis between 1983 and 1985.

Achievements in championships and series:

- European Touring Car Championship (Group A); 3 titles (1981, 1983 and 1986)
- Deutsche Tourenwagen Meisterschaft; 1 title (1984)
- Belgian Touring Car Championship (Group N); 1 title (1984)
- Australian Touring Car Championship; 1 title (1985)
- Australian Endurance Championship; 2 titles (1985 and 1986)
- Australian Manufacturers' Championship; 1 title (1985)
- AMSCAR Series; 1 title (1985)
- European Hill Climb Championship; 1 title (1985)
- New Zealand Touring Car Championship; 2 titles (1985 and 1987)
- New Zealand Benson & Hedges Saloon Car Series; 1 title (1985)
- Nissan-Mobil 500 Series (New Zealand); 1 title (1985)
- Japanese Touring Car Championship; 1 titles (1985)

Race wins:

- RAC Tourist Trophy; 2 wins (1980 and 1984)
- 4h/500 km of Monza; 3 wins (1980, 1981 and 1983)
- Guia Race; 1 win (1983)
- Spa 24 Hours; 3 wins (1983, 1985 and 1986)
- 24 Hours Nürburgring; 2 wins (1984 and 1985)
- Sandown 500; 1 win (1985)
