= BMW M88 =

BMW M88 engine
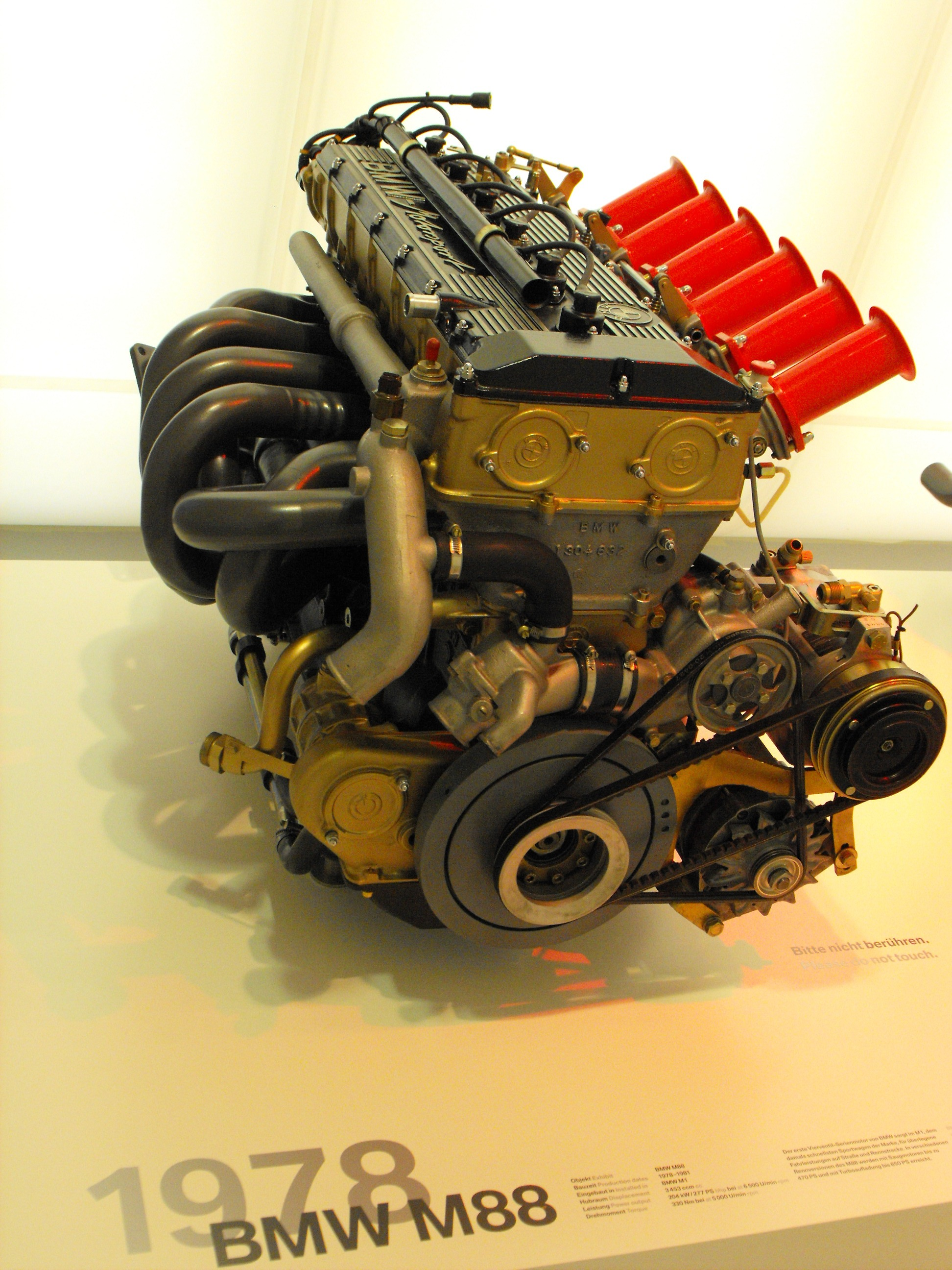

Overview
- Manufacturer: BMW
- Also called: BMW M30B35LE; BMW M90
- Production: 1978–1989

Layout
- Configuration: Straight-6
- Displacement: 3.5 L (3,453 cc)
- Cylinder bore: 93.4 mm (3.7 in)
- Piston stroke: 84 mm (3.3 in)
- Cylinder block material: Cast iron
- Cylinder head material: Aluminium
- Valvetrain: DOHC (M88); SOHC (M30B35LE/M90)

Combustion
- Fuel type: Petrol

Chronology
- Predecessor: None
- Successor: BMW S38

The BMW M88 is a straight-6 DOHC petrol engine which was produced from 1978 to 1989. It is based on the DOHC version of the BMW M49 engine, which was used in the BMW 3.0CSi racing cars.

The M88 was produced alongside the BMW M30 engine, as the higher performance engine. In North America up until 1989, the BMW S38 engine was used instead of the M88. In 1989, an updated version of the S38 became the worldwide replacement for the M88. The M30B35LE is a SOHC engine which is based on the M88/1; this is sometimes referred to as the M90.

== Design ==
BMW engineers used a DOHC valvetrain on a production engine for the first time on the M88, with the camshafts driven by a single-row timing chain. Kugelfischer fuel injection was used with individual throttle valves and the distinctive six individual throttle bodies.

The construction is an aluminium cylinder head and a cast iron block. The bore is 93.4 mm (3.68 in) and the stroke is 84.0 mm (3.31 in), resulting in a displacement of 3,453 cc (210.7 cu in).

== Versions ==
Engine code	Power	Torque	Years	Note
M88	204 kW (277 PS; 273 hp) at 6,500 rpm	330 N⋅m (243 lb⋅ft) at 5,000 rpm	1978-1981	BMW M1
M88/1	346 kW (470 PS; 464 hp) at 9,000 rpm	390 N⋅m (288 lb⋅ft) at 7,000 rpm	1979-1980	Gr.4 Procar
M88/2	up to 625–735 kW (850–1,000 PS; 838–986 hp) at 9,000 rpm	847–1,017 N⋅m (625–750 lb⋅ft) at 7,000 rpm	1979-1981	Gr. 5 turbo
M88/3	210 kW (286 PS; 282 hp) at 6,500 rpm	340 N⋅m (251 lb⋅ft) at 4,500 rpm	1983–1989	M635 CSi, M5, 745i (South Africa only)
M30B35LE/M90	160 kW (218 PS; 215 hp) at 5,200 rpm	304 N⋅m (224 lb⋅ft) at 4,000 rpm	1978–1982	SOHC

=== M88 ===
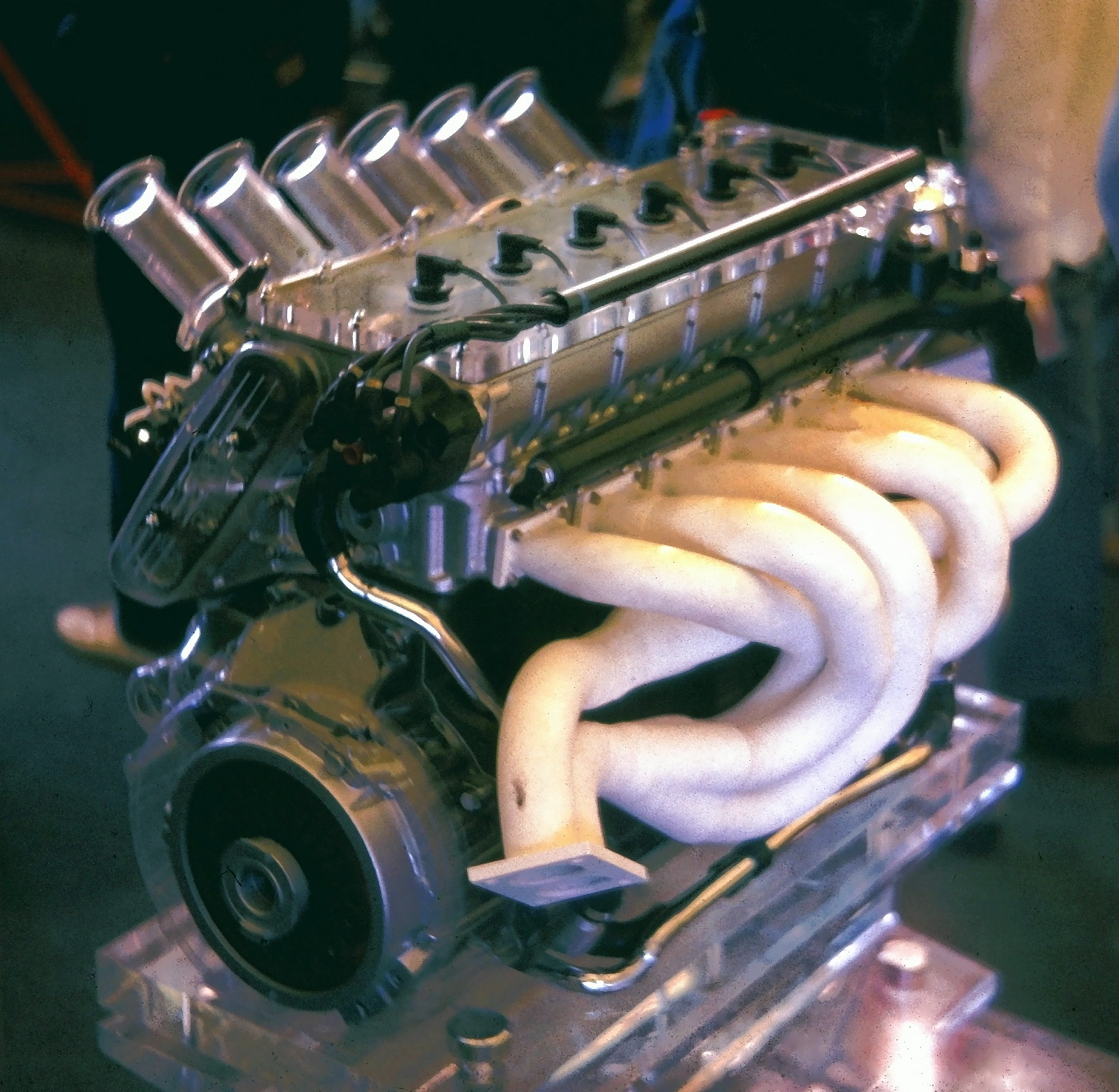
M88/1 with some parts replaced with Plexiglas for display purposes

The M88 was the original iteration of the engine and was fitted to the BMW M1. It produces 277 PS (204 kW; 273 hp) at 6,500 rpm and 330 N⋅m (240 lb⋅ft) at 5,500 rpm. A dry sump is used.

Applications:

- 1978-1981 M1

=== M88/1 ===
For the BMW M1 Procar single-make series, the M88 engine was bored out marginally to reach 3,498 cc (3.5 L). This racing version, called the M88/1, met the Group 4 regulations. This race engine produced 350 kW (480 PS; 470 hp) in Procar specifications. This version had forged pistons, sharper camshafts, bigger valves, as well as oil cooling for the transmission and rear differential.

Applications:

- 1979-1980 Procar BMW M1

=== M88/2 ===
For Group 5 racing, the M88 engine was turbocharged and became known as the M88/2. It was downsleeved and had a shorter stroke to displace 3,191 cc (3.2 L), which with the 1.4 turbo factor placed it in the 4.5-liter class. This race engine produced up to 670 kW (910 PS; 900 hp).

Applications:

- Group 5 racing cars (BMW M1 Group 5 page)

=== M88/3 ===
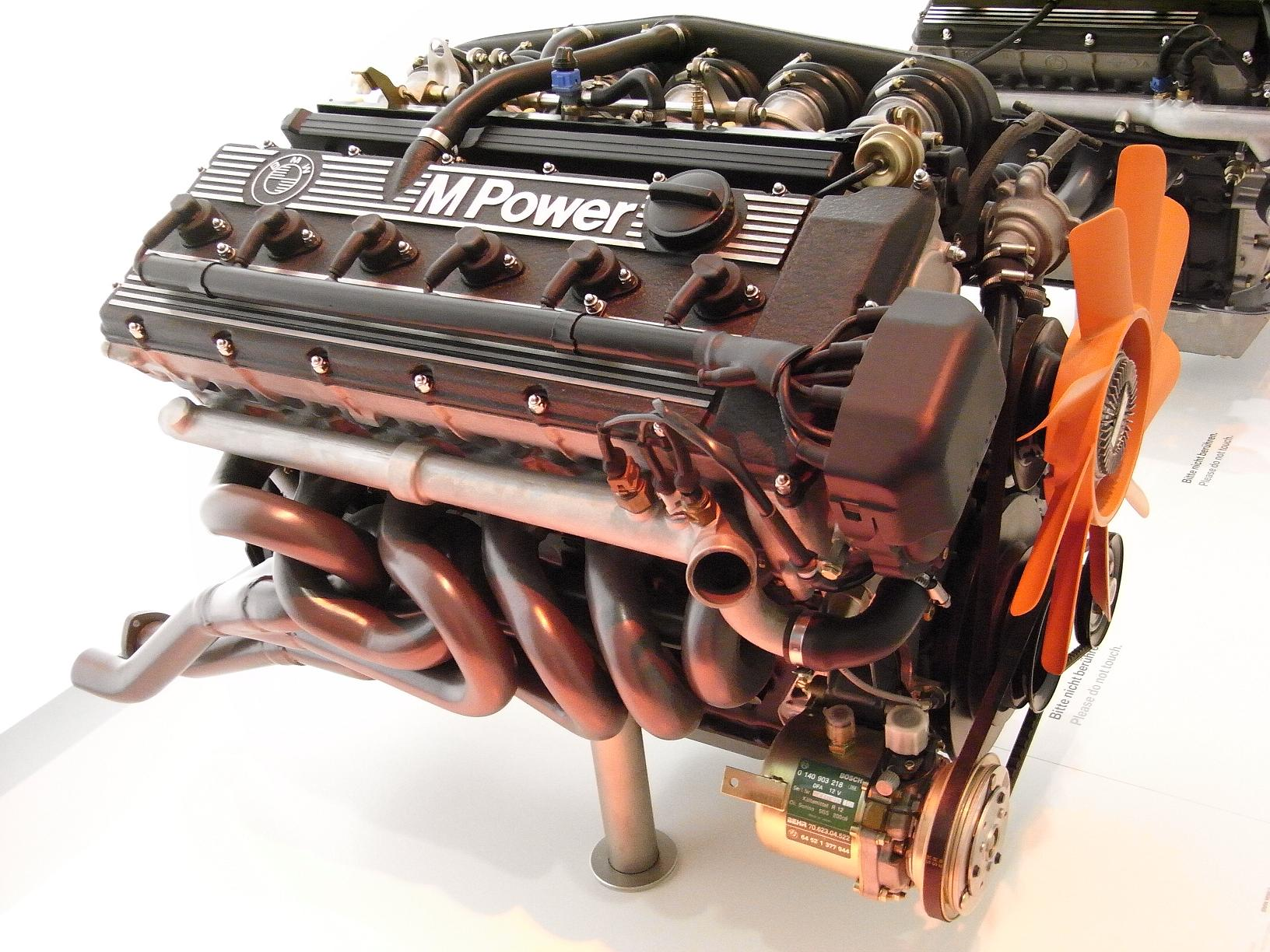
M88/3 iteration used in the E24 M635CSi and E28 M5.

The M88/1 engine was modified for use in the E24 M635CSi and E28 M5 and was known as the M88/3. The Kugelfischer fuel injection was replaced with Bosch Motronic producing 210 kW (290 PS; 280 hp) at 6,500 rpm and 340 N⋅m (250 lb⋅ft) at 4,500 rpm. It has a compression ratio of 10.5:1.

The M88/3 was also fitted to the South African BMW 745i, due to packaging problems with the turbocharged M102 engine which was used in other markets.

Applications:

- 1983-1989 E24 M635CSi
- 1984-1987 E28 M5
- 1984-1987 E23 745i (South Africa only)

== M30B35LE ==
The M30B35LE is a lower performance, two-valve, SOHC version of the M88/1 engine, also known as the M90. It utilizes the same block as the M88 and maintains the same bore and stroke, but borrows its head from the BMW M30 engine family. Depending on year, this engine uses either Bosch Motronic or Bosch L-Jetronic as its engine management system. Typically identified by a white L painted on the block behind the oil filter housing and coolant water passages on the side of the block.

As sold in Europe and most other markets (except North America), this engine used a compression ratio of 9.3:1, did not have a catalytic converter, and produced 160 kW (220 PS; 210 hp).

Applications:

- 1979-1981 E12 M535i
- 1978-1982 E24 635CSi
- 1978-1982 E23 735i

== See also ==
- BMW S14 - Four-cylinder engine based on the M88
