= BMW S38 =

BMW S38 engine
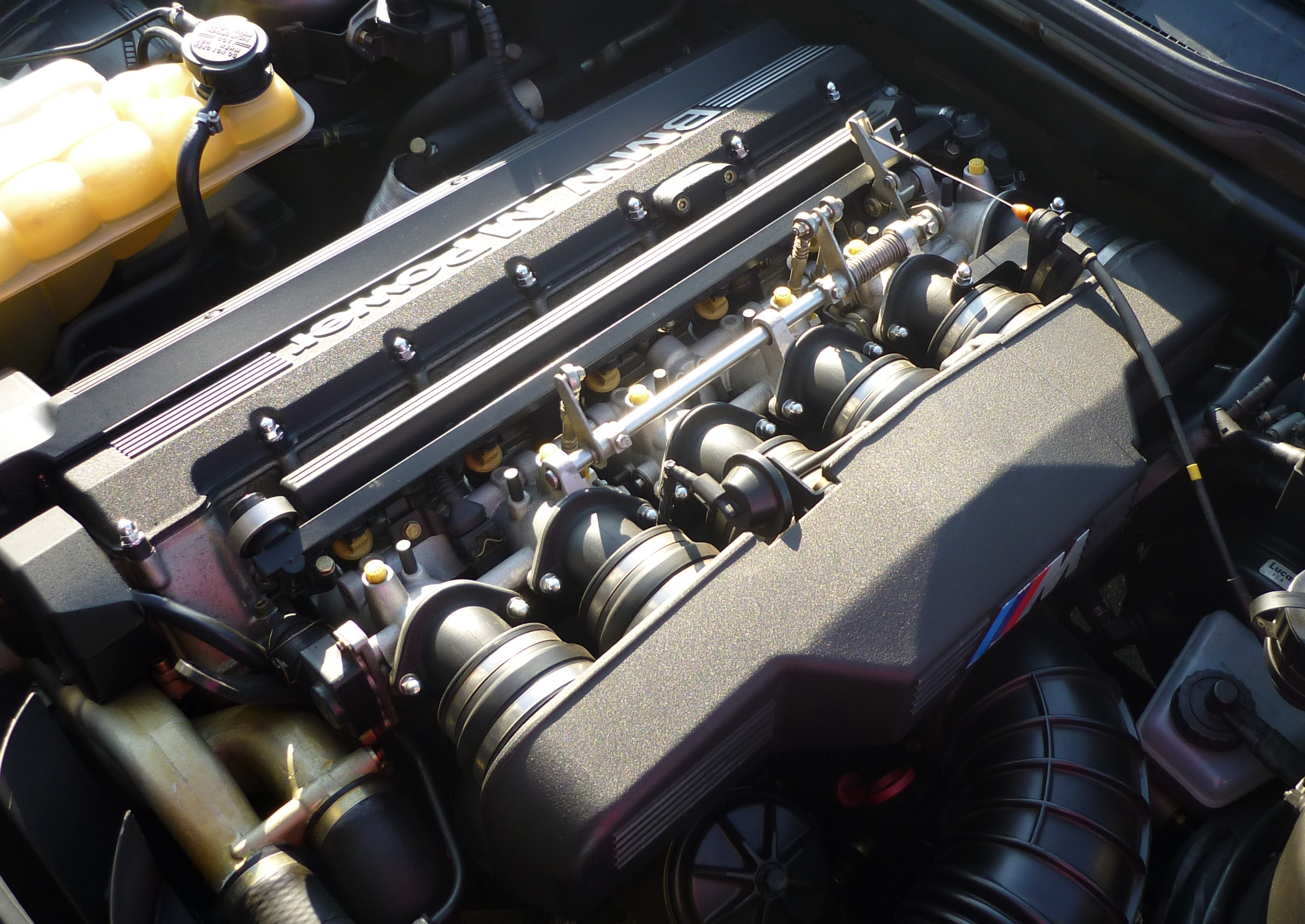
- S38B36

Overview
- Production: 1984–1995

Layout
- Configuration: Straight-6
- Displacement: 3.5 L (3,453 cc); 3.5 L (3,535 cc); 3.8 L (3,795 cc)
- Cylinder bore: 93.4 mm (3.68 in); 94.6 mm (3.72 in)
- Piston stroke: 84 mm (3.31 in); 86 mm (3.39 in); 90 mm (3.54 in)
- Cylinder block material: Cast iron
- Cylinder head material: Aluminium
- Valvetrain: DOHC

Combustion
- Fuel type: Petrol

Chronology
- Predecessor: BMW M88
- Successor: None

The BMW S38 is a straight-6 DOHC petrol engine which replaced the M88 and was produced from 1984–1995. The S38 was originally produced for North America as an equivalent to the M88 with slightly lower power output. In 1989, power output of the S38 was increased and it became the worldwide replacement for the M88.

In 1998, the BMW M5 switched to the S62 V8 engine. There is therefore no direct successor to the S38, however the BMW S50 engine took over as BMW's high performance straight-6 engine.

== Design ==
The S38 is based on the M88/3 engine. Compared to the M88/3, the S38 has a lower compression ratio (9.8:1), simplified exhaust manifold, catalytic converter, dual-row timing chain and a shorter camshaft duration. As per the M88/3, the S38 uses a DOHC valvetrain with shim-and-bucket valve actuation. Air intake is via six individual throttle bodies with intake trumpets, fed by a cast aluminum intake plenum.

== Versions ==
Version	Displacement	Power	Torque	Years
S38B35	3,453 cc (210.7 cu in)	190 kW (255 hp) at 6,500 rpm	330 N⋅m (243 lb⋅ft) at 4,500 rpm	1986–1989
S38B36	3,535 cc (215.7 cu in)	232 kW (311 hp) at 6,900 rpm	360 N⋅m (266 lb⋅ft) at 4,750 rpm	1989–1993
S38B38	3,795 cc (231.6 cu in)	250 kW (335 hp) at 6,900 rpm	400 N⋅m (295 lb⋅ft) at 4,750 rpm	1991–1995

=== S38B35 ===
The initial version of the S38 has a bore of 93.4 mm (3.7 in) and a stroke of 84 mm (3.3 in).

Applications:

- 1986–1987 E28 M5 - Canada, Japan and US
- 1986–1988 E24 M6 - Canada, Japan and US
- 1987–1989 E24 M635CSi - models with catalytic converter

=== S38B36 ===
For the S38B36, the displacement was increased to 3,535 cc (216 cu in). This was achieved by increasing the stroke by 2 mm (0.079 in) to 86 mm (3.39 in), by using a new forged steel crankshaft. Other changes included revised camshafts, compression ratio increasing to 10:1, a variable-length inlet manifold (to improve low-rev torque), equal length stainless steel exhaust headers a hotwire mass airflow sensor (MAF) and Bosch Motronic engine management.

Applications:

- 1988–1992 E34 M5 (worldwide)
- 1989–1993 E34 M5 - Canada and US

=== S38B38 ===
In late 1991, BMW further enlarged the S38 engine to 3,795 cc (231.6 cu in), by increasing the bore to 94.6 mm (3.72 in) and the stroke to 90 mm (3.54 in). Power increased to 250 kW (335 hp) at 6,900 rpm and torque increased to 400 N⋅m (295 lb⋅ft) at 4,750 rpm.

The engine management was upgraded to Motronic 3.3 and the ignition system was upgraded to coil-on-plug ignition. Other changes included the compression ratio increasing to 10.5:1, a dual-mass flywheel, larger intake and exhaust valves, lighter pistons, and the throttle bodies increasing by 4 mm (0.16 in) to 50 mm (2.0 in).

Applications:

- 1991–1995 E34 M5 - European-specification
