= Nico Menzel =

German racing driver (born 1997)

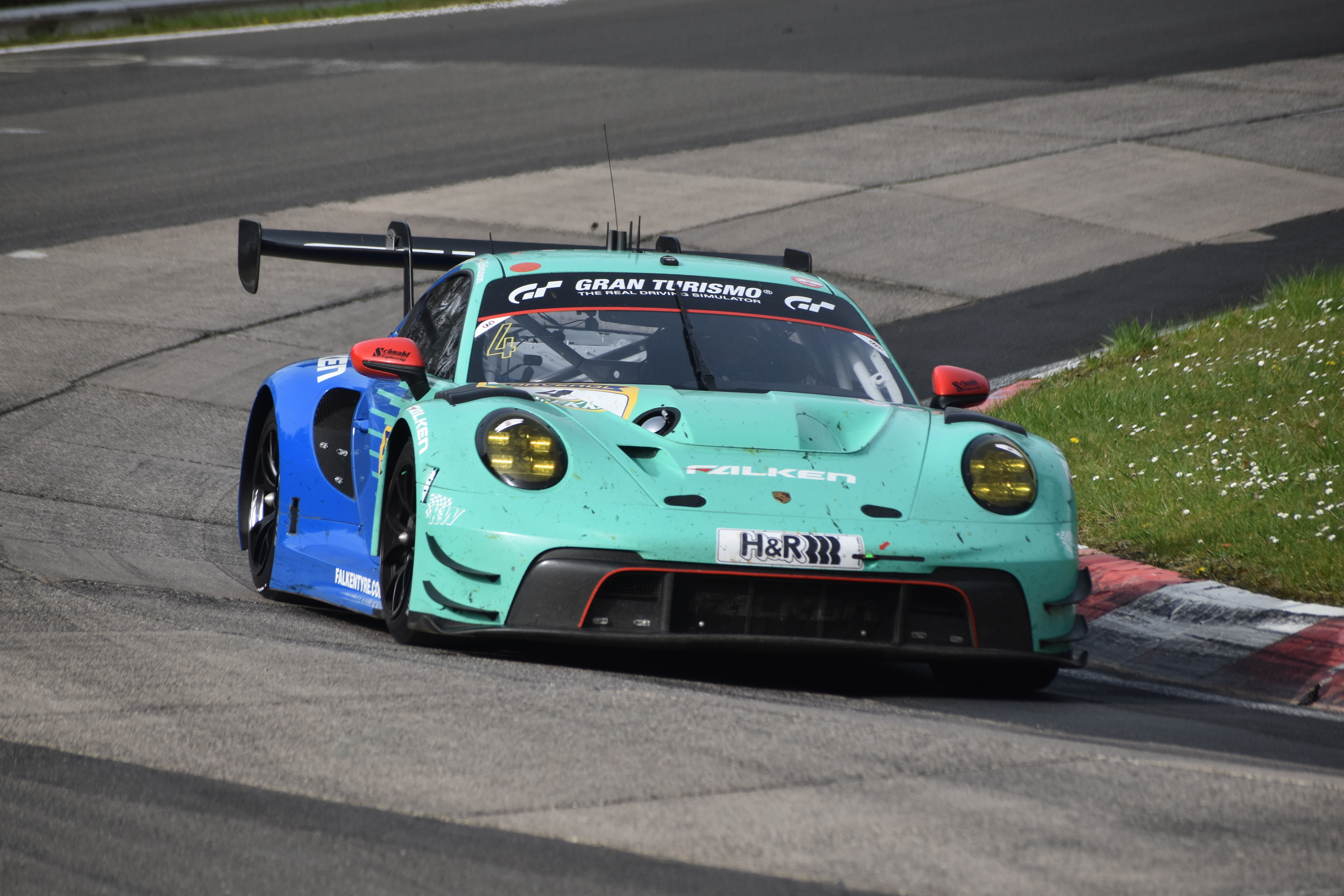
- Menzel's Falken Porsche in 2024
- Nationality: (Germany) German
- Born: 11 December 1997 (age 28) Adenau, Germany
- Relatives: Christian Menzel (father)
- Categorisation: FIA Silver (until 2022); FIA Gold (2023–)

Championship titles
- 2016: Porsche Carrera Cup Asia

Nico Menzel (born 11 December 1997) is a German racing driver who last competed in the Nürburgring Langstrecken-Serie for Dunlop Motorsport, and previously for Falken Motorsports.

Menzel is a Porsche contracted driver, and has won Porsche Carrera Cup Asia in 2016, as well as the 24 Hours of Nürburgring in class in both 2020 and 2021.

== Early career ==
Following a career in karts, Menzel made his single-seater debut in 2013, racing in the final edition of the Formula BMW Talent Cup. Having taken one win in the test races, Menzel won race two at the Grand Final held at Oschersleben and finished runner-up to Robin Hansson in the standings. In 2014, Menzel joined Schiller Motorsport to compete in the final season of the ADAC Formel Masters. Menzel scored a best result of fifth at Zandvoort and concluded the season 12th in points.

Leaving single-seaters after 2014, Menzel moved to Asia for 2015, joining Team StarChase in Porsche Carrera Cup Asia. Having taken his maiden win at Sepang, Menzel finished third in the standings in his maiden season in the series. Returning to Porsche Carrera Cup Asia for 2016, Menzel beat Maxime Jousse to the title despite not scoring any overall wins throughout the season.

== GT career ==
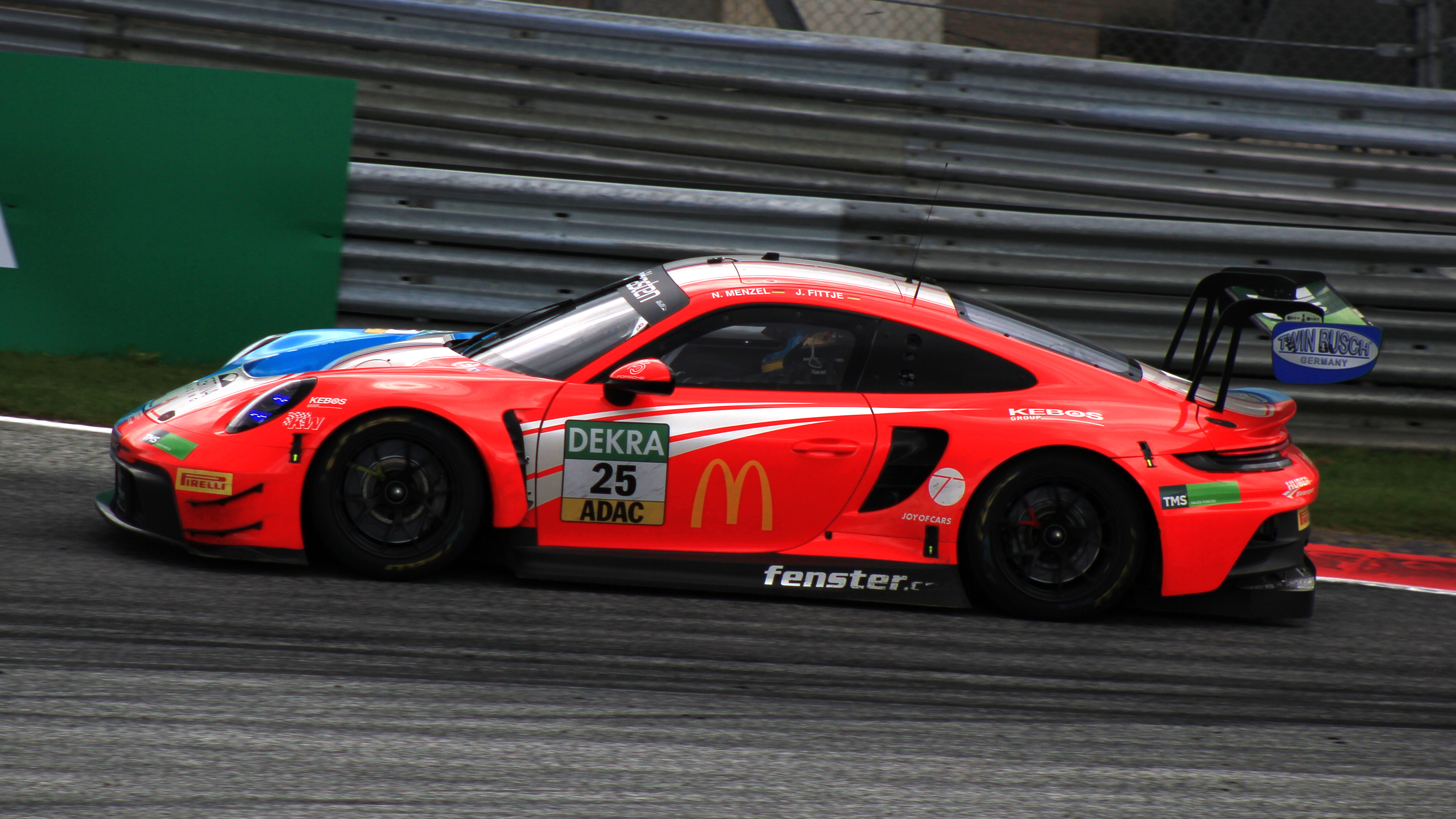
Menzel at the Red Bull Ring round of the 2023 ADAC GT Masters season

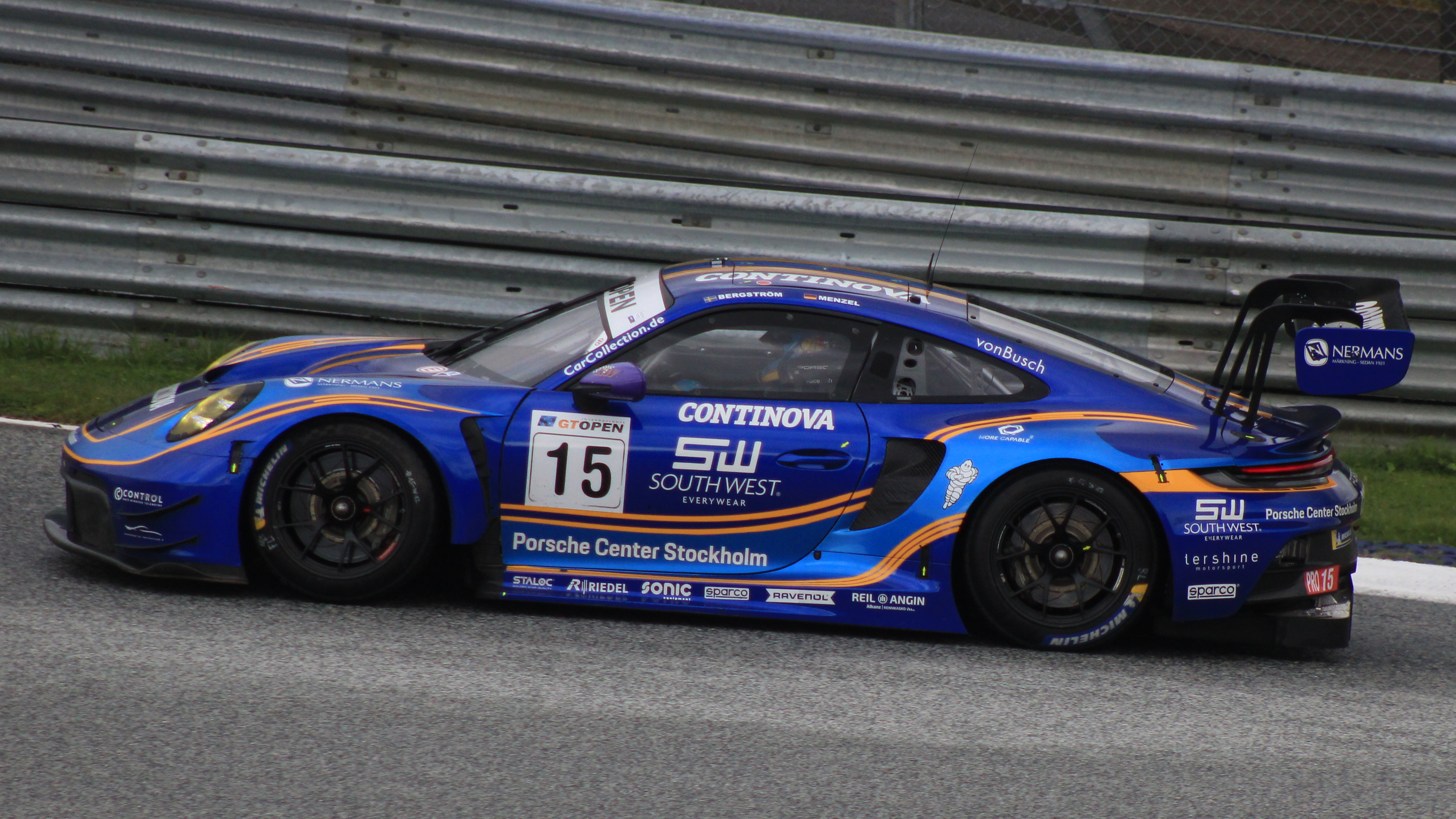
Menzel at the Red Bull Ring round of the 2024 International GT Open season

During 2016, Menzel joined the BMW Motorsport Junior programme alongside Ricky Collard. Towards the end of the year, Menzel made his debut in GT3 machinery, taking part in the VLN Series, where he scored a best result of second at the final round of the season in just his second race in the category.

Having been set to make his international GT3 debut at the 2017 Bathurst 12 Hour, Menzel's car suffered a crash in qualifying, which damaged the chassis and thus was retired before the race started. Menzel's main program for 2017 was in the Blancpain GT Series Endurance Cup, where he competed for Walkenhorst Motorsport alongside Christian Krognes and Mikkel Jensen.

Despite a disappointing season in Blancpain GT Series Endurance Cup, Menzel retained BMW junior status for 2018, joining RN Vision STS in GT4 European Series alongside Beitske Visser. Taking his maiden GT4 win in race two at Hungaroring, Menzel won race one at Nürburgring and ended the season with a second-place finish in the season finale to end the year ninth in the standings.

Over the following two years, Menzel raced full-time in the Nürburgring Langstrecken-Serie, competing for Mühlner Motorsport in the Cayman Cup in 2019, along with a one-off SP9 outing with KCMG at that year's 24 Hours of Nürburgring. Whilst in 2020, Menzel primarily competed in the SP7 class of the series with Huber Motorsport, and also competed in the 24 Hours of Nürburgring for the same team, albeit in SP9 Pro-Am, where he won in class and finished 15th overall in the red-flagged race.

In 2021, Menzel stayed with Huber Motorsport to contest the Nürburgring Langstrecken-Serie in SP9 Pro-Am class. Menzel also made his debut in the 24 Hours of Spa and scored another class win at the 24 Hours of Nürburgring. Following a class podium at the 2022 24 Hours of Nürburgring, Menzel joined main Porsche customer Falken Motorsports for the 2023 Nürburgring Langstrecken-Serie and that year's edition of the 24 Hours of Nürburgring.

During 2023, Menzel also competed for Huber Motorsport in ADAC GT Masters alongside Jannes Fittje. Menzel won race two at Norisring from pole position and scored four more podiums across the season to finish third in the standings. Menzel was retained by Falken Motorsports and took two wins, with one of which being in the qualifying races for the 2024 24 Hours of Nürburgring. In late February 2024, Menzel joined Car Collection Motorsport to compete in the International GT Open alongside Gustav Bergström. Scoring a win at Barcelona from pole position, Menzel ended the season sixth in points.

In early March 2025, it was announced that Menzel would remain with Falken Motorsports for another NLS season along with another participation at the 24 Hours of Nürburgring. Running on a part-time schedule in NLS, Menzel scored a lone overall win at the NLS10 alongside Dorian Boccolacci. During 2025, Menzel also competed in GT World Challenge Asia for GTO Racing Team, scoring a Pro-Am win in Beijing to end the year 11th in the class standings. Menzel returned to the NLS for 2026, as he remained with Schnabl Engineering under the Dunlop Motorsport brand, a season in which he took two overall wins at NLS6 and NLS10. During 2026, Menzel also raced part-time in the GT World Challenge Europe Endurance Cup for Tsunami RT and Boutsen VDS, in which he took a Gold Cup podium with the latter at the Nürburgring.

== Personal life ==
Menzel is the son of 1998 Nürburgring 24 Hours winner Christian Menzel.

== Racing record ==
=== Racing career summary ===
Season	Series	Team	Races	Wins	Poles	F/Laps	Podiums	Points	Position
2013	Formula BMW Talent Cup	N/A	3	1	0	0	2	40	**2nd**
2014	ADAC Formel Masters	Schiller Motorsport	24	0	0	0	0	36	12th
2015	Porsche Carrera Cup Asia	PICC Team Starchase	14	2	2	3	6	192	**3rd**
2015	Porsche Supercup	Market Leader by Project 1	3	0	0	0	0	0	30th
2016	Porsche Carrera Cup Asia	PICC Team Starchase	12	0	1	0	8	208	**1st**
2016	Porsche Carrera Cup Germany	Rookie Team Deutsche Post by Project 1	2	0	0	0	0	0	NC†
2016	VLN Series – SP9	BMW Team RBM	1	0	1	0	1	0	NC
2017	Intercontinental GT Challenge	Walkenhorst Motorsport	1	0	0	0	0	0	NC
2017	Bathurst 12 Hour – APP	Walkenhorst Motorsport	0	0	0	0	0	—N/a	DNS
2017	Blancpain GT Series Endurance Cup	Walkenhorst Motorsport	5	0	0	0	0	0	NC
2017	Blancpain GT Series Endurance Cup – Pro-Am	Walkenhorst Motorsport	1	0	0	0	0	21	21st
2017	VLN Series – SP9	Walkenhorst Motorsport	2	0	0	0	0	0	NC
2017	24 Hours of Nürburgring – SP9	Walkenhorst Motorsport	1	0	0	0	0	—N/a	DNF
2017	Blancpain GT Series Asia – Pro-Am	FIST - Team AAI	2	0	0	0	0	0	NC†
2017	24H Series – A6Pro	Wochenspiegel Team Monschau	1	0	0	0	1	33	NC
2018	GT4 European Series – Silver	RN Vision STS	10	2	0	0	3	92	9th
2018	24 Hours of Nürburgring – SP8T	Securtal Sorg Rennsport	1	0	0	0	0	—N/a	6th
2018	24H GT Series – A6 Pro	Wochenspiegel Team Monschau	1	0	0	0	0	0	NC†
2018	VLN Series – SP9 Pro	Wochenspiegel Team Monschau	6	0	0	0	1	8.75	40th
2019	VLN Series – Cayman GT4	Mühlner Motorsport	8	5	0	0	6	55.26	**3rd**
2019	VLN Series – SP9 Pro	KCMG	1	0	0	1	0	4.25	75th
2019	24 Hours of Nürburgring – SP9	KCMG	1	0	0	0	0	—N/a	DNF
2019	24H GT Series – A6	Wochenspiegel Team Monschau	2	0	0	0	0	6	26th
2020	Nürburgring Langstrecken-Serie – SP7	Huber Motorsport	5	1	0	0	3	24.53	5th
2020	24 Hours of Nürburgring – SP9 Pro-Am	Huber Motorsport	1	1	0	0	1	—N/a	**1st**
2021	Nürburgring Langstrecken-Serie – SP9 Pro-Am	Huber Motorsport	5	3	2	0	4	0	NC
2021	Intercontinental GT Challenge	Huber Motorsport	1	0	0	0	0	0	NC
2021	GT World Challenge Europe Endurance Cup – Am	Huber Motorsport	1	0	0	0	1	36	**2nd**
2021	24 Hours of Nürburgring – SP9 Pro-Am	Huber Motorsport	1	1	0	0	1	—N/a	**1st**
2022	Nürburgring Langstrecken-Serie – SP9 Pro-Am	Huber Motorsport	1	1	0	0	1	0	NC
2022	24 Hours of Nürburgring – SP9 Pro-Am	Huber Motorsport	1	0	0	0	1	—N/a	**3rd**
2022	GT World Challenge Europe Endurance Cup – Pro-Am	Herberth Motorsport	1	0	0	0	0	34	8th
2023	ADAC GT Masters	Huber Motorsport	12	1	1	0	5	165	**3rd**
2023	Nürburgring Langstrecken-Serie – SP9 Pro	Falken Motorsports	3	0	0	0	0	0	NC
2023	24 Hours of Nürburgring – SP9 Pro	Falken Motorsports	1	0	0	0	0	—N/a	8th
2023	GT World Challenge Europe Endurance Cup – Pro-Am	Car Collection Motorsport	1	0	0	0	1	39	9th
2023	Italian GT Endurance Championship – GT Cup	Centro Porsche Ticino	2	1	0	0	1	0	NC
2024	Le Mans Cup – GT3	High Class Racing	1	0	0	0	0	12	16th
2024	Intercontinental GT Challenge	Falken Motorsports	1	0	0	0	0	6	21st
2024	Nürburgring Langstrecken-Serie – SP9 Pro	Falken Motorsports	3	2	0	0	2	0	NC
2024	24 Hours of Nürburgring – SP9 Pro	Falken Motorsports	1	0	0	0	0	—N/a	9th
2024	International GT Open	Car Collection Motorsport	14	1	1	1	4	86	6th
2024–25	Asian Le Mans Series – GT	Car Collection Motorsport	6	0	0	0	0	6	22nd
2025	6 Hour of Portimão	A-Workx	1	0	0	0	0	—N/a	5th
2025	GT World Challenge Asia	GTO Racing Team	12	0	0	0	1	28	22nd
2025	GT World Challenge Asia – Pro-Am	GTO Racing Team	12	1	0	0	1	67	11th
2025	Nürburgring Langstrecken-Serie - SP9 Pro	Falken Motorsports	5	1	1	1	3	0	NC
2025	24 Hours of Nürburgring – SP9 Pro	Falken Motorsports	1	0	0	0	0	—N/a	DNF
2025	Intercontinental GT Challenge	Falken Motorsports	1	0	0	0	0	0	NC
2025	Intercontinental GT Challenge	Phantom Global Racing	1	0	0	0	0	0	NC
2026	Nürburgring Langstrecken-Serie – SP9 Pro	Dunlop Motorsports	5	2	0	0	3	33	NC
2026	24 Hours of Nürburgring – SP9 Pro	Dunlop Motorsports	1	0	0	0	0	—N/a	DNF
2026	Intercontinental GT Challenge	Dunlop Motorsports	1	0	0	0	0	0	NC
2026	Intercontinental GT Challenge	Tsunami RT	1	0	0	0	0	0	NC
2026	GT World Challenge Europe Endurance Cup	Tsunami RT	1	0	0	0	0	4	30th
2026	GT World Challenge Europe Endurance Cup	Boutsen VDS	1	0	0	0	0	4	30th
2026	GT World Challenge Europe Endurance Cup – Gold	Boutsen VDS	1	0	0	0	1	18	17th
2026	China GT Championship – GT3	Phantom Global Racing	2	0	0	0	0	0*	NC*
2026	Nürburgring Langstrecken-Serie – SP9 Pro-Am	Goroyan RT by Car Collection	1	0	0	0	1	14	NC

=== Complete ADAC Formel Masters results ===
(key) (Races in bold indicate pole position) (Races in italics indicate fastest lap)

Year	Team	1	2	3	4	5	6	7	8	9	10	11	12	13	14	15	16	17	18	19	20	21	22	23	24	DC	Points
2014	Schiller Motorsport	OSC; 1; 9	OSC; 2; 11	OSC; 3 Ret	ZAN; 1 Ret	ZAN; 2 Ret	ZAN; 3; 5	LAU; 1; 13	LAU; 2; 9	LAU; 3; 11	RBR; 1; 7	RBR; 2; 8	RBR; 3; 11	SVK; 1; 11	SVK; 2; 11	SVK; 3; 10	NÜR; 1; 11	NÜR; 2; 11	NÜR; 3; 8	SAC; 1; 12	SAC; 2 Ret	SAC; 3; 9	HOC; 1; 10	HOC; 2; 7	HOC; 3; 8	12th	36

=== Complete Porsche Supercup results ===
(key) (Races in bold indicate pole position) (Races in italics indicate fastest lap)

Year	Team	1	2	3	4	5	6	7	8	9	10	11	Pos.	Pts
2015	Market Leader by Project 1	CAT	MON	RBR	SIL	HUN; DSQ	SPA; 31†	SPA; 25	MNZ	MNZ	USA	USA	30th	0

=== Complete GT World Challenge Europe results ===
==== GT World Challenge Europe Endurance Cup ====
Year	Team	Car	Class	1	2	3	4	5	6	7	Pos	Points
2017	Walkenhorst Motorsport	BMW M6 GT3	Pro	MNZ; Ret	SIL; 18	LEC; 26				CAT; Ret	NC	0
2017	Walkenhorst Motorsport	BMW M6 GT3	Pro-Am				SPA; 6H; 21	SPA; 12H; 23	SPA; 24H; 20		21st	21
2021	Huber Racing	Porsche 911 GT3 R	Am	MNZ	LEC	SPA; 6H; 51	SPA; 12H; 39	SPA; 24H; 38†	NÜR	CAT	2nd	36
2022	Herberth Motorsport	Porsche 911 GT3 R	Pro-Am	IMO	LEC	SPA; 6H; 27	SPA; 12H; 20	SPA; 24H; 43†	HOC	CAT	8th	34
2023	Car Collection Motorsport	Porsche 911 GT3 R (992)	Pro-Am	MNZ	LEC	SPA; 6H; 35	SPA; 12H; 36	SPA; 24H; 23	NÜR	CAT	9th	39
2026	Tsunami RT	Porsche 911 GT3 R (992.2)	Pro-Am	LEC	MNZ	SPA; 6H; 53	SPA; 12H; 47	SPA; 24H; 38			NC	0
2026	Boutsen VDS	Porsche 911 GT3 R (992.2)	Gold						NÜR; 8	ALG	17th	18

=== 24 Hours of Nürburgring results ===
Year	Team	Co-Drivers	Car	Class	Laps	Pos.	Class Pos.
2017	(Germany) Walkenhorst Motorsport	(Germany) Michele Di Martino (Finland) Matias Henkola (Norway) Christian Krognes	BMW M6 GT3	SP9	0	DNS	DNS
2018	(Germany) Securtal Sorg Rennsport	(Germany) Dirk Adorf (Netherlands) Tom Coronel (Netherlands) Beitske Visser	BMW M4 GT4	SP8T	92	102nd	6th
2019	(Hong Kong) KCMG	(Germany) Christer Jöns (Italy) Edoardo Liberati (France) Matthieu Vaxivière	Nissan GT-R Nismo GT3	SP9	65	DNF	DNF
2020	(Germany) Huber Motorsport	(Germany) Marco Holzer (Germany) Patrick Kolb (Italy) Lorenzo Rocco Di Torrepadula	Porsche 911 GT3 R	SP9; Pro-Am	82	15th	**1st**
2021	(Germany) Huber Motorsport	(Germany) Stefan Aust (Germany) Philipp Neuffer (Germany) Marco Seefried	Porsche 911 GT3 R	SP9; Pro-Am	59	8th	**1st**
2022	(Germany) Huber Motorsport	(Germany) Lars Kern (Germany) Klaus Rader (Germany) Joachim Thyssen	Porsche 911 GT3 R	SP9; Pro-Am	156	11th	**3rd**
2023	(Germany) Falken Motorsports	(Sweden) Joel Eriksson (Germany) Tim Heinemann (Austria) Martin Ragginger	Porsche 911 GT3 R (992)	SP9; Pro	160	10th	8th
2024	(Germany) Falken Motorsports	(Sweden) Joel Eriksson (Germany) Tim Heinemann (Austria) Martin Ragginger	Porsche 911 GT3 R (992)	SP9; Pro	50	10th	9th
2025	(Germany) Falken Motorsports	(France) Julien Andlauer (Germany) Sven Müller (Belgium) Alessio Picariello	Porsche 911 GT3 R (992)	SP9; Pro	23	DNF	DNF
2026	(Germany) Dunlop Motorsport	(France) Julien Andlauer (France) Dorian Boccolacci (Belgium) Alessio Picariello	Porsche 911 GT3 R (992.2)	SP9; Pro	62	DNF	DNF

=== Complete GT World Challenge Asia results ===
(key) (Races in bold indicate pole position) (Races in italics indicate fastest lap)

Year	Team	Car	Class	1	2	3	4	5	6	7	8	9	10	11	12	Pos.	Points
2017	FIST - Team AAI	BMW M6 GT3	Pro-Am	SEP; 1	SEP; 2	BUR; 1	BUR; 2	SUZ; 1	SUZ; 2	FUJ; 1	FUJ; 2	SHA; 1; 6	SHA; 2; 9	ZHE; 1	ZHE; 2	NC	0
2025	GTO Racing Team	Porsche 911 GT3 R (992)	Pro-Am	SEP; 1; 4	SEP; 2; 11	MAN; 1; 10	MAN; 2 Ret	BUR; 1; 7	BUR; 2; 10	FUJ; 1; 12	FUJ; 2; 5	OKA; 1 Ret	OKA; 2; 7	BEI; 1; 1	BEI; 2; 7	11th	67

=== Complete GT4 European Series results ===
(key) (Races in bold indicate pole position) (Races in italics indicate fastest lap)

Year	Team	Car	Class	1	2	3	4	5	6	7	8	9	10	11	12	Pos	Points
2018	RN Vision STS	BMW M4 GT4	Silver	ZOL; 1; 7	ZOL; 2; 7	BRH; 1	BRH; 2	MIS; 1 Ret	MIS; 2; 7	SPA; 1; 29	SPA; 2 Ret	HUN; 1; 13	HUN; 2; 1	NÜR; 1; 1	NÜR; 2; 2	9th	92

=== Complete ADAC GT Masters results ===
(key) (Races in bold indicate pole position) (Races in italics indicate fastest lap)

Year	Team	Car	1	2	3	4	5	6	7	8	9	10	11	12	DC	Points
2023	Huber Motorsport	Porsche 911 GT3 R (992)	HOC1; 1; 3	HOC1; 2; 6	NOR; 1; 2^{2}	**NOR**; **2**; 1^{1}	NÜR; 1; 9	NÜR; 2; 11	SAC; 1; 8^{3}†	SAC; 2; 7	RBR; 1; 3	RBR; 2; 4	HOC2; 1; 3^{3}	HOC2; 2; 4	3rd	165

=== Complete International GT Open results ===
(key) (Races in bold indicate pole position) (Races in italics indicate fastest lap)

Year	Team	Car	Class	1	2	3	4	5	6	7	8	9	10	11	12	13	14	Pos.	Points
2024	Car Collection Motorsport	Porsche 911 GT3 R (992)	Pro	ALG; 1; 7	ALG; 2; 5	HOC; 1; 9	HOC; 2; 3	SPA; Ret	HUN; 1; 8	HUN; 2; 2	LEC; 1; 12	LEC; 2; 8	RBR; 1; 2	RBR; 2; 7	**CAT**; **1**; 1	CAT; 2; 8	MNZ; 5	6th	86

=== Complete Asian Le Mans Series results ===
(key) (Races in bold indicate pole position) (Races in italics indicate fastest lap)

Year	Team	Class	Car	Engine	1	2	3	4	5	6	Pos.	Points
2024–25	Car Collection Motorsport	GT	Porsche 911 GT3 R (992)	Porsche 4.2 L Flat-6	SEP; 1; 9	SEP; 2; 15	DUB; 1; 12	DUB; 2; 9	ABU; 1; 15	ABU; 2; 16	22nd	6
