= 2019 24 Hours of Nürburgring =

Endurance motor race in Germany

Nürburgring 24h track (Nordschleife+GP Circuit without Mercedes-Arena)

The 2019 ADAC 24 Hours of Nürburgring was the 47th running of the 24 Hours of Nürburgring. It took place over 20–23 June 2019.

The race was won by Pierre Kaffer, Frank Stippler, Dries Vanthoor and Frédéric Vervisch in the #4 Phoenix Racing Audi R8 LMS Evo.

== Race ==
=== Race results ===
Class winners in bold.

Pos	Class	No.	Team / Entrant	Drivers	Vehicle	Laps
1	**SP9**	**4**	**(Germany) Audi Sport Team Phoenix**	**(Germany) Pierre Kaffer (Germany) Frank Stippler (Belgium) Dries Vanthoor (Belgium) Frédéric Vervisch**	**Audi R8 LMS Evo**	**157**
2	SP9	3	(Germany) Mercedes-AMG Team Black Falcon	(Germany) Maximilian Buhk (Germany) Hubert Haupt (Germany) Thomas Jäger (Germany) Luca Stolz	Mercedes-AMG GT3	156
3	SP9	14	(Germany) Audi Sport Team Car Collection	(Germany) Christopher Haase (Switzerland) Marcel Fässler (Germany) René Rast (Germany) Markus Winkelhock	Audi R8 LMS Evo	156
4	SP9	12	(Germany) Manthey Racing	(Italy) Matteo Cairoli (Germany) Lars Kern (Germany) Otto Klohs (Norway) Dennis Olsen	Porsche 911 GT3 R (17)	155
5	SP9	33	(Germany) Falken Motorsports	(United Kingdom) Peter Dumbreck (Netherlands) Stef Dusseldorp (Switzerland) Alexandre Imperatori (Germany) Jens Klingmann	BMW M6 GT3	155
6	SP9	18	(Germany) GetSpeed Performance	(Switzerland) Philip Ellis (Germany) Luca Ludwig (Netherlands) Jules Szymkowiak (Germany) Fabian Vettel	Mercedes-AMG GT3	155
7	SP9	5	(Germany) Phoenix Racing	(Netherlands) Jeroen Bleekemolen (Germany) Vincent Kolb (Germany) Kim-Luis Schramm (Germany) Frank Stippler	Audi R8 LMS Evo	154
8	**SP-X**	**705**	**(United States) Scuderia Cameron Glickenhaus**	**(Germany) Felipe Fernández Laser (France) Franck Mailleux (Germany) Thomas Mutsch (Sweden) Andreas Simonsen**	**Scuderia Cameron Glickenhaus SCG 003c**	**154**
9	SP9	45	(Japan) Kondo Racing	(Netherlands) Tom Coronel (Japan) Tomonobu Fujii (Japan) Tsugio Matsuda (Japan) Mitsunori Takaboshi	Nissan GT-R Nismo GT3	154
10	SP9	11	(Germany) Wochenspiegel Team Monschau	(Germany) Oliver Kainz (Germany) Daniel Keilwitz (Germany) Jochen Krumbach (Germany) Alexander Mattschull	Ferrari 488 GT3	153
11	SP9	8	(Germany) IronForce by Ring Police	(Belgium) Adrien De Leener (Luxembourg) Steve Jans (Germany) Lucas Luhr (Germany) Jan-Erik Slooten	Porsche 911 GT3 R (19)	153
12	SP9	22	(Germany) Wochenspiegel Team Monschau	(Netherlands) Indy Dontje (Germany) Hendrik Still (Germany) Georg Weiss (Germany) Leonard Weiss	Ferrari 488 GT3	152
13	SP9	17	(Germany) GetSpeed Performance	(United States) Janine Hill (Finland) Markus Palttala (Germany) Fabian Schiller (United States) John Shoffner	Mercedes-AMG GT3	150
14	**SP7**	**62**	**(Belgium) Mühlner Motorsport**	**(Germany) Marcel Hoppe (Germany) Moritz Kranz (Canada) Mark J. Thomas (Germany) Sebastian von Gartzen**	**Porsche 911 GT3 Cup**	**148**
15	SP9	15	(Germany) Car Collection Motorsport	(Germany) Stefan Aust (Germany) Oliver Bender (Germany) Christian Bollrath (Switzerland) Jean-Louis Hertenstein	Audi R8 LMS Evo	146
16	SP7	58	(Germany) Bonk Motorsport	(Germany) Ralf-Peter Bonk (United Kingdom) Bill Cameron (Germany) Arno Klasen	Porsche 911 GT3 Cup	146
17	**SP10**	**70**	**(Germany) Black Falcon Team Identica**	**(Germany) Marek Böckmann (Switzerland) Yannick Mettler (Germany) Tobias Müller (Estonia) Tristan Viidas**	**Mercedes-AMG GT4**	**145**
18	**SP3T**	**88**	**(Japan) Subaru Tecnica International**	**(Japan) Takuto Iguchi (Germany) Tim Schrick (Netherlands) Carlo van Dam (Japan) Hideki Yamauchi**	**Subaru WRX STI GT N24**	**145**
19	**SP8**	**148**	**(Germany) Giti Tire Motorsport by RaceIng**	**(Switzerland) Rahel Frey (Germany) Bernhard Henzel (Bulgaria) Pavel Lefterov (Germany) Frank Schmickler**	**Audi R8 LMS BE**	**145**
20	SP9	44	(Germany) Falken Motorsports	(Austria) Klaus Bachler (Germany) Jörg Bergmeister (Austria) Martin Ragginger (Germany) Dirk Werner	Porsche 911 GT3 R (19)	145
21	**AT**	**320**	**(Germany) Team Care For Climate**	**(Germany) Axel Duffner (Germany) Daniel Schellhaas (Germany) Thomas von Löwis of Menar**	**Porsche 911 GT3 Cup**	**144**
22	SP7	64	(Germany) Black Falcon Team Textar	(United States) Peter Ludwig (Germany) Maik Rosenberg (Switzerland) Takis Spiliopoulos (United States) Dennis Trebing	Porsche 911 GT3 Cup MR	144
23	SP7	61	(Germany) Team 9und11 Racing	(Germany) Georg Goder (Germany) Ralf Oehme (Germany) Tim Scheerbarth (Germany) Martin Schlüter	Porsche 911 GT3 Cup	143
24	SP10	71	(Switzerland) Hofor Racing by Bonk Motorsport	(Austria) Michael Fischer (Germany) Claudia Hürtgen (Austria) Thomas Jäger (Germany) Michael Schrey	BMW M4 GT4	142
25	SP7	63	(Germany) Huber Motorsport	(Germany) Ulrich Berg (Germany) Patrick Kolb (United States) Jonathan Miller (Germany) Johannes Stengel	Porsche 911 GT3 Cup	142
26	**SP6**	**80**	**(Germany) Schmickler Performance powered by Ravenol**	**(Germany) Michael Grassl (Switzerland) Ivan Jacoma (Germany) Claudius Karch (Germany) Achim Wawer**	**Porsche Cayman GT4 Clubsport MR**	**142**
27	**SP8T**	**37**	**(United Kingdom) AMR Performance Centre**	**(United Kingdom) Alex Brundle (United Kingdom) Peter Cate (United Kingdom) Jamie Chadwick**	**Aston Martin Vantage AMR GT4**	**142**
28	**Cup 3**	**310**	**(Germany) Team Mathol Racing e.V.**	**(Germany) Marc Keilwerth (Germany) Montana (Switzerland) Rüdiger Schicht (Argentina) Marcos Adolfo Vázquez**	**Porsche 718 Cayman GT4 Clubsport**	**141**
29	SP3T	93	(Germany) Bonk Motorsport	(Germany) Hermann Bock (Germany) Achim Nett (Germany) Jürgen Nett (Germany) Max Partl	Audi RS 3 LMS TCR	140
30	Cup 3	306	(Germany) Schmickler Performance by Ravenol	(Switzerland) Roger Kurzen (Germany) Rolf Buchstaller (Germany) Winfried Assmann (Germany) Kai Riemer	Porsche 718 Cayman GT4 Clubsport	140
31	**Kl. Cup**	**240**	**(Germany) Pixum Team Adrenalin Motorsport**	**(Germany) Norbert Fischer (Germany) Yannick Fübrich (Norway) Oskar Sandberg (Germany) Daniel Zils**	**BMW M240i Racing**	**140**
32	Kl. Cup	247	(Germany) Team Avia Sorg Rennsport	(Germany) Heiko Eichenberg (Norway) Inge Hansesaetre (Norway) Sindre Setsaas (United Kingdom) Will Tregurtha	BMW M240i Racing	140
33	SP10	74	(Germany) Leutheuser Racing & Events	(Germany) Rudi Adams (Switzerland) Manuel Amweg (Germany) Arne Hoffmeister (Germany) Florian Wolf	BMW M4 GT4	140
34	Kl. Cup	235	(Germany) FK Performance Motorsport	(Germany) Marc Ehret (Finland) Juha Hannonen (Germany) Christian Konnerth (United Kingdom) Ben Tuck	BMW M240i Racing	139
35	SP10	73	(Czech Republic) KKraemer Racing powered by REWITEC	(United States) Jean-Francois Brunot (United Kingdom) Charles Ladell (United Kingdom) Charlie Robertson (United Kingdom) Colin White	Ginetta G55 GT4	139
36	SP7	66	(Germany) QA Racing by Kurt Ecke	(Germany) Kurt Ecke (Germany) Steffen Schlichenheimer (Germany) Andreas Sczepansky (Germany) Matthias Wasel	Porsche 911 GT3 Cup	139
37	SP8T	51	(Germany) Team Speedline Racing	(Germany) Michael Funke (Germany) Philipp Göschel (Germany) Sven Schädler (Germany) Frank Weishar	BMW M4 GT4	138
38	**TCR**	**172**	**(Italy) Team Castrol Honda Racing**	**(Germany) Dominik Fugel (Portugal) Tiago Monteiro (Germany) Markus Oestreich (Germany) Cedrik Totz**	**Honda Civic Type R TCR (FK8)**	**138**
39	SP10	72	(Germany) Car Collection Motorsport	(France) Olivier Baharian (France) Thierry Blaise (France) Guillaume Roman (France) Mathieu Sentis	Audi R8 LMS GT4	137
40	SP8T	90	(Japan) Toyota Gazoo Racing	(Belgium) Herwig Daenens (Germany) Uwe Kleen (Japan) Akio Toyoda ("Morizo") (Japan) Masahiro Sasaki	Toyota GR Supra GT4	137
41	SP9	19	(Japan) Bandoh Racing with Novel Racing	(Germany) Dominik Farnbacher (Austria) Marco Seefried (Germany) Michael Tischner (Japan) Hiroki Yoshimoto	Lexus RC F GT3	136
42	Cup 3	305	(Czech Republic) KKraemer Racing powered by REWITEC	(Germany) Sascha Kloft (Germany) Karsten Krämer (Germany) Noah Nagelsdiek (Russia) Alexey Veremenko	Porsche Cayman GT4 Clubsport MR	136
43	SP8	53	(Germany) Giti Tire Motorsport by WS Racing	(China) Li Fei (China) Rainey He (Hong Kong) Sunny Wong (Hong Kong) Andy Yan	Audi R8 LMS GT4	136
44	TCR	171	(South Korea) Hyundai Motorsport	(Germany) Marc Basseng (Germany) Manuel Lauck (Belgium) Nico Verdonck (Germany) Moritz Oestreich	Hyundai Veloster N TCR	136
45	Kl. Cup	241	(Germany) Pixum Team Adrenalin Motorsport	(Germany) Stefan Kruse (Germany) Marcel Lenerz (Italy) Francesco Merlini (Germany) Thorsten Wolter	BMW M240i Racing	135
46	Cup 3	303	(Belgium) Mühlner Motorsport	(Germany) Thorsten Jung (Germany) Moritz Kranz (Germany) Michael Rebhan (Germany) Alexander Schula	Porsche Cayman GT4 Clubsport MR	135
47	SP8T	36	(United Kingdom) AMR Performance Centre	(Germany) Christian Gebhardt (United Kingdom) Chris Goodwin (United Kingdom) Darren Turner	Aston Martin Vantage AMR GT4	134
48	Kl. Cup	244	(Germany) Team Scheid Honert Motorsport	(Germany) Nico Otto (Germany) Hendrik van Danwitz (Germany) Jörg Weidinger (Germany) Nick Wüstenhagen	BMW M240i Racing	134
49	**V6**	**133**	**(Germany) Black Falcon Team Textar**	**(Russia) Alexander Akimenkov (Germany) Ronny Lethmate (Luxembourg) Carlos Rivas (Russia) Vasilii Selivanov**	**Porsche 911 Carrera**	**134**
50	Cup 3	309	(Germany) Team Mathol Racing e.V.	(Germany) Henning Cramer (Germany) Thorsten Held (Germany) Jörg Kittelmann (Germany) Max Walter von Bär	Porsche Cayman GT4 Clubsport MR	134
51	SP6	125	(Germany) SetupWizzard Racing	(Germany) Michael Czyborra (Germany) Mario Farnbacher (Germany) Mathias Hüttenrauch (Germany) Hannes Plesse	Porsche 911 GT3 Cup	134
52	Kl. Cup	243	(Germany) Leutheuser Racing & Events	(Germany) Klaus-Dieter Frommer (Germany) Mark Hellerich (Germany) Michael Hess (Germany) Florian Naumann	BMW M240i Racing	133
53	**SP-Pro**	**56**	**(Japan) Toyota Gazoo Racing**	**(Japan) Naoya Gamou (Japan) Takamitsu Matsui (Japan) Yuichi Nakayama (Japan) Takeshi Tsuchiya**	**Lexus LC N24 GT**	**133**
54	**V5**	**146**	**(Germany) FK Performance Motorsport**	**(Germany) Fabian Finck (Germany) Fabio Grosse (Germany) Jens Moetefindt (Luxembourg) Yann Munhowen**	**Porsche Cayman**	**132**
55	**Cup-X**	**110**	**(Germany) Teichmann Racing**	**(Luxembourg) Daniel Bohr (Germany) Michael Brüggenkamp (Germany) Robert Schröder (Germany) Andreas Tasche**	**KTM X-Bow GT4**	**132**
56	SP8T	52	(Germany) Team Speedline Racing	(Germany) Hans-Martin Gass (Germany) Heiko Hahn (Germany) Christian Heuchemer (Germany) Thomas Heuchemer	BMW Schirmer-M2 GT	131
57	V6	132	(Germany) Black Falcon Team Textar	(Germany) Christoph Hoffmann (Germany) Carsten Palluth (Germany) Tobias Wahl (United Kingdom) Robert Woodside	Porsche 911 Carrera	131
58	Kl. Cup	236	(Germany) FK Performance Motorsport	(Germany) Stefan Branner (Germany) Andreas Schaflitzl (Germany) Ethan Tremblay	BMW M240i Racing	130
59	Kl. Cup	237	(Germany) FK Performance Motorsport	(Germany) Simon Klemund (Germany) Andreas Ott (Luxembourg) Alain Pier (Germany) Hans Wehrmann	BMW M240i Racing	129
60	Kl. Cup	239	(Germany) Hofor Racing by Bonk Motorsport	(Germany) Axel Burghardt (Japan) Ryusho Konishi (Germany) Thomas Leyherr (Japan) Ryu Seya	BMW M240i Racing	129
61	**SP3**	**115**	**(Japan) TMG United (Toyota Gazoo Racing)**	**(Germany) Adrian Brusius (Germany) Alex Fielenbach (Germany) Lars Peucker (Germany) Finn Unteroberdörster**	**Toyota GT86 Cup**	**129**
62	Kl. Cup	242	(Germany) Pixum Team Adrenalin Motorsport	(Italy) Alessandro Cremascoli (Germany) Stephan Kuhs (Germany) Jacek Pydys (Austria) Jeff Young	BMW M240i Racing	129
63	SP3T	96	(Germany) MSC Sinzig e.V. im ADAC	(Germany) Volker Garrn (Germany) Knut Kluge (Germany) Stefan Lohn (Germany) Jens Wulf	Volkswagen Golf VII GTI	129
64	**V4**	**150**	**(Germany) Pixum Team Adrenalin Motorsport**	**(Germany) Philipp Kowalski (Germany) Christoph Magg (Germany) John Lee Schambony (Germany) Philipp Stahlschmidt**	**BMW E90 325i**	**127**
65	V5	145	(Czech Republic) KRS Krumbach Racing Service	(Denmark) Henrik Bollerslev (Luxembourg) Charles Kauffman (Germany) André Krumbach (Switzerland) Marco Timbal	Porsche Cayman GT4 Clubsport MR	127
66	Cup 3	304	(Germany) MKR Engineering	(Germany) Maximilian Bernau (Germany) Thomas Bernau (Switzerland) Benedikt Frei (Switzerland) Viktor Schyrba	Porsche Cayman GT4 Clubsport MR	126
67	SP3	123	(Germany) Pit lane AMC Sankt Vith	(Belgium) Brody (Belgium) Jacques Derenne (Belgium) Olivier Muytjens	Toyota GT86 Cup	125
68	Kl. Cup	246	(Germany) Team Avia Sorg Rennsport	(United States) Lance Boicelli (United States) Cameron Evans (United Kingdom) Charlie Postins (United States) Scott Smith	BMW M240i Racing	125
69	V6	991	(Germany) MRC RaceWorld	(Germany) Guido Heinrich (Czech Republic) Milan Kodidek (Germany) Ralf Weiner (Switzerland) Guido Wirtz	Porsche 911 Carrera	125
70	V4	326	(Germany) MRC RaceWorld	(Germany) Christian Andreas Franz (Germany) Daniel Jolk (Germany) Sascha Korte (Germany) Michael Mönch	BMW E90 325i	124
71	SP8T	46	(Germany) Black Falcon Team Knuffi	(Germany) Stefan Karg (Turkey) Mustafa-Mehmet Kaya (Germany) Reinhold Renger (Germany) Mike Stursberg	Mercedes-AMG GT4	123
72	V4	153	(Germany) HARD Speed Motorsport	(Germany) Nick Hancke (Germany) Elmar Jurek (Germany) Maik Kraske (Germany) Thomas Schöffner	BMW E90 325i	123
73	V4	147	(Belgium) JJ Motorsport	(Belgium) Bruno Beulen (Belgium) Pieter Denys (Belgium) Gregory Eyckmans (Finland) Rory Penttinen	BMW E90 325i	123
74	SP7	69	(Germany) Clickvers.de Team	(Germany) Robin Chrzanowski (Germany) Kersten Jodexnis (New Zealand) Peter Scharmach (Germany) Marco Schelp	Porsche 911 GT3 Cup MR	123
75	V4	151	(Germany) Pixum Team Adrenalin Motorsport	(Sweden) Dan Berghult (United Kingdom) Benjamin Lyons (Switzerland) Juha Miettinen (Germany) Kevin Warum	BMW E90 325i	120
76	**V2T**	**162**	**(Germany) Manheller Racing**	**(Austria) Markus Fischer (United Kingdom) Martin Owen (Japan) Yutaka Seki (Germany) Kurt Strube**	**BMW F30 330i**	**120**
77	V4	155	(Germany) Team Avia Sorg Rennsport	(Germany) Oliver Frisse (Germany) Torsten Kratz (United Kingdom) Joseph Moore (Germany) Björn Simon	BMW E90 325i	119
78	V5	140	(Germany) Pixum Team Adrenalin Motorsport	(United States) James Briody (Germany) Christian Teichert (Switzerland) Markus Zünd (Switzerland) Urs Zünd	Porsche 981 Cayman	119
79	SP3	120	Toyota Gazoo Racing Team Thailand	(Thailand) Arthit Ruengsomboon (Taiwan) Chen Jian Hong (Japan) Naoki Kawamura (Thailand) Grant Supaphongs	Toyota C-HR Cup	119
80	SP3T	95	(Germany) Team Avia Sorg Rennsport	(Switzerland) Peter Haener (Germany) Christoph Hewer (Germany) Rudolf Speich (Germany) Roland Waschkau	Audi RS3	118
81	**SP6**	**81**	**(Switzerland) Hofor-Racing**	**(Switzerland) Martin Kroll (Switzerland) Roland Eggimann (Germany) Christian Titze (Austria) Gustav Engljähringer**	**BMW M3 CSL**	**118**
82	Cup-X	112	(Germany) Teichmann Racing GmbH	(Norway) Christian Bjørn-Hansen (Norway) Runar Vatne (Germany) Georg Griesemann (Germany) Christoph Dupré	KTM X-Bow GT4	118
83	AT	109	(Germany) OVR Racing Cologne	(Germany) Ralph Caba (Germany) Oliver Sprungmann (Germany) Patrick Rehs	Ford Mustang GT	116
84	**SP3**	**127**	**(Germany) Manheller Racing**	**(Switzerland) Dominic Tranchet (Germany) Moritz Gusenbauer (Germany) Werner Gusenbauer (United Kingdom) Christopher Chadwick**	**Toyota GT86**	**116**
85	SP5	84	(Germany) Leutheuser Racing&Events	(Germany) Harald Rettich (France) Fabrice Reicher (Austria) Richard Purtscher (Germany) Uwe Legermann	BMW 1 M-Coupe	116
86	SP4	325	(Germany) MRC RaceWorld	(Germany) Daniel Niermann (Germany) Sebastian Schemmann (Germany) Paul Martin Dose (Germany) Hans Joachim Legermann	BMW E90 325i	115
87	V4	154	(Germany) rent2Drive-Familia-racing	(Germany) Richard Gresek (Germany) Philipp Gresek (United Kingdom) Dale Lomas (Germany) Moritz Gusenbauer	BMW E90 325i	114
88	Cup-X	60	(Germany) RaceUnion	(Germany) Stephan Brodmerkel (Germany) Torleif Nytröen (Germany) Karlheinz Teichmann	KTM X-Bow	110
89	SP3	114	(Germany) aufkleben.de - Motorsport	(Germany) Michael Uelwer (Germany) Volker Kühn (Germany) Marc Wylach (Germany) Sebastian Bohrer	Renault Clio Sport	110
90	V2T	164	(Germany) TJ-Racing-Team	(Germany) Andreas Kunert (Portugal) Carlos Antunes Tavares (Switzerland) Herbie Schmidt (France) Francois Wales	Opel Astra OPC	109
91	V4	152	(Germany) Oepen Motorsport	(Germany) Ingo Oepen (Germany) Sven Hoffmann (Germany) Thorsten Köppert (Germany) Klaus Müller	BMW E46 325CI	108
92	SP10	77	(Germany) Pixum Team Adrenalin Motorsport	(Germany) Philipp Leisen (Germany) Danny Brink (Germany) Christopher Rink	BMW M4 GT4	106
93	TCR	170	(South Korea) Hyundai Motorsport N	(Austria) Harald Proczyk (Germany) Peter Terting (Germany) Andreas Gülden (Germany) Manuel Lauck	Hyundai i30 Fastback N	103
94	SP3T	91	(Germany) Giti Tire Motorsport by WS Racing	(Germany) Ulrich Schmidt (Germany) Ralf Lammering (Germany) Mario Hendrick (United Kingdom) David Drinkwater	Volkswagen Golf VI GTI	101
95	V5	142	(Germany) QTQ-Raceperformance Florian Quante	(Germany) Florian Quante (Germany) Bernd Kleeschulte (Liechtenstein) Matthias Kaiser	BMW E36 M3	99
96	V2T	160	(Germany) Hyundai Team Engstler	(Germany) Franz Engstler (Germany) Luca Engstler (Germany) Guido Naumann (South Korea) Byung Hyi Kang	Hyundai i30 Fastback N	97
97	SP4T	85	(Germany) MSC Sinzig	(Argentina) Jose Visir (Argentina) Eduardo Romanelli (Argentina) Alejandro Chahwan (Argentina) Frederico Braga	VW Golf 5 R-Line GTI	96
98	SP8	20	(Germany) Ring Racing with Novel Racing	(Japan) Yoshinobu Koyama (Japan) Tohjiro Azuma (Japan) Taketoshi Matsui (Japan) Kota Sasaki	Lexus RCF	95
99	AT	13	(Germany) skate-aid e.V.	(Germany) Bernd Albrecht (Germany) Titus Dittmann (Germany) Reinhard Schall (Germany) Michael Lachmayer	Dodge Viper Competition Coupe	92
100	SP4	130	(Italy) Ring-Speed Motorsport	(Italy) Mauro Simoncini (Switzerland) Simone Barin (Switzerland) Roberto Barin (Italy) Bruno Barbaro	BMW 325 CI Coupe	90
101	SP3	126	(Germany) MSC Sinzig e.V. im ADAC	(Germany) Ralph Liesenfeld (Germany) Achim Ewenz (Germany) David Schneider (Germany) Raphael Klingmann	VW Golf 3 16V	86
NC	SP3	122	(Germany) AvD	(Germany) Olaf Beckmann (Germany) Peter Hass (Germany) Volker Strycek (Germany) Jürgen Schulten	Opel Manta (Flying Fox) GT	28
DNF	SP9 PRO	29	(Germany) Audi Sport Team Land	(Germany) Christopher Mies (Germany) René Rast (South Africa) Kelvin van der Linde (Germany) Christopher Haase	Audi R8 LMS Evo	139
DNF	SP9 PRO	16	(Germany) GetSpeed Performance	(Netherlands) Renger van der Zande (France) Tristan Vautier (Germany) Jan Seyffarth (Germany) Kenneth Heyer	Mercedes-AMG GT3	139
DNF	SP9 PRO	6	(Germany) Mercedes-AMG Team Black Falcon	(Germany) Patrick Assenheimer (Germany) Nico Bastian (Netherlands) Yelmer Buurman (Italy) Gabriele Piana	Mercedes-AMG GT3	138
DNF	SP9	30	(Germany) Frikadelli Racing Team	(Germany) Klaus Abbelen (Germany) Alexander Müller (Germany) Robert Renauer (Austria) Thomas Preining	Porsche 911 GT3 R (19)	135
DNF	SP9	31	(Germany) Frikadelli Racing Team	(France) Romain Dumas (Australia) Matt Campbell (Germany) Sven Müller (France) Mathieu Jaminet	Porsche 911 GT3 R (19)	134
DNF	SP9	7	(Germany) Konrad Motorsport GmbH	(Italy) Marco Mapelli (Zimbabwe) Axcil Jefferies (Germany) Michele Di Martino (United Kingdom) Michael Lyons	Lamborghini Huracan GT3 Evo	126
DNF	SP9	48	(Germany) Mercedes-AMG Team Mann Filter	(Germany) Christian Hohenadel (Germany) Lance David Arnold (Italy) Raffaele Marciello (Germany) Maximilian Götz	Mercedes-AMG GT3	120
DNF	SP3	118	(Germany) TJ-Racing-Team MSC Adenau e.V.	(Germany) Tobias Jung (Germany) Daniel Jenichen (Germany) Christian Rziczny (Germany) Bernd Kupper	Opel Calibra TJ-R	113
DNF	TCR	173	(Germany) FEV Racing	(Germany) Benedikt Gentgen (Germany) Martin Pischinger (Germany) Lukas Thiele (Germany) Andre Gies	Seat Cupra TCR	107
DNF	AT	420	(Germany) TEAM CARE FOR CLIMATE	(Germany) Thomas Kiefer (Germany) Andreas Patzelt (Belgium) Denis Dupont (Japan) Hisanao Kurata	Porsche Cayman GT4 CS	102
DNF	V5	144	(Austria) GTronix 360 Team mcchip-dkr	(Japan) Kohei Fukuda (Germany) Ben Bünnagel (Germany) Markus Diederich (Germany) Thomas D. Hetzer	Porsche Cayman 981	101
DNF	SP6	78	(Germany) rent2Drive-FAMILIA-racing	(Germany) 'Der Bommel' (Germany) Dirk Vleugels (Germany) Carsten Welschar (Germany) Andreas Riedl	Porsche 997 GT3 Cup	96
DNF	V5	141	(Germany) Pixum Team Adrenalin Motorsport	(Germany) Ulrich Korn (Luxembourg) Charles Oakes (Norway) Einar Thorsen (Germany) Matthias Beckwermert	Porsche Cayman	95
DNF	SP10	76	(Germany) Prosport-Performance GmbH	(Germany) Christoph Breuer (Netherlands) Kay van Berlo (Germany) Alexander Mies (Germany) Mike David Ortmann	Aston Martin V8 Vantage GT4	92
DNF	SP3T	92	(Germany) Giti Tire Motorsports by WS Racing	(Austria) Fritz Rabensteiner (Germany) Uwe Stein (Germany) Christian Meurer (Germany) Manuel Braun	Volkswagen Golf VI GTI	81
DNF	SP10	68	(Germany) Prosport-Performance GmbH	(Germany) Jörg Viebahn (Denmark) Nicolaj Møller Madsen (Finland) Joonas Lappalainen	Aston Martin V8 Vantage GT4	72
DNF	SP3	116	(Germany) MSC Adenau	(Germany) Stephan Epp (Germany) Gerrit Holthaus (Germany) Michael Bohrer (Germany) Christopher Bruchmann	Renault Clio Cup	71
DNF	SP9	39	(Hong Kong) KCMG	(Germany) Nico Menzel (Italy) Edoardo Liberati (Germany) Christer Jöns (France) Matthieu Vaxivière	Nissan GT-R Nismo GT3	65
DNF	V3T	718		(Germany) Ralf Zensen (Germany) Fabian Peitzmeier (Germany) Michael Küke (Germany) Edgar Salewsky	Porsche 718	65
DNF	CUP3	302	(Germany) Aimpoint Racing by Rothfuss Best Gabion	(Germany) Axel Friedhoff (Germany) Max Friedhoff (Germany) Jan Kasperlik (United States) Andres Serrano	Porsche Cayman GT4 CS	64
DNF	SP8	777		(Germany) Stephan Woelflick (Germany) Jürgen Gagstatter (Switzerland) Urs Bressan (Germany) Jens Ludmann	Ford Mustang GT	64
DNF	SP9	100	(Germany) Walkenhorst Motorsport	(Germany) Henry Walkenhorst (Germany) Andreas Ziegler (Germany) Jörn Schmidt-Staade (France) Jordan Tresson	BMW M6 GT3	62
DNF	SP3T	94	(Luxembourg) TWM-Motorsport	(Luxembourg) Mike Schmit (Germany) Michael Eichhorn (Germany) Raphael Hundeborn (Germany) Robin Strycek	Opel Astra	62
DNF	SP9 PRO	1	(Germany) Manthey Racing	(Austria) Richard Lietz (France) Frédéric Makowiecki (France) Patrick Pilet (United Kingdom) Nick Tandy	Porsche 911 GT3 R (911 II)	61
DNF	SP10	75	(Germany) Team Avia Sorg Rennsport	(Germany) Stefan Beyer (Germany) Emin Akata (Germany) Olaf Meyer (Germany) Fidel Leib	BMW M4 GT4	60
DNF	SP3T	89	(Germany) Girls Only Team by WS Racing	(Switzerland) Jasmin Preisig (Germany) Carrie Schreiner (Germany) Ronja Aßmann	Volkswagen Golf VII GTI TCR	59
DNF	CUP3	301	(Germany) ESBA-Racing	(Germany) Ulf Ehninger (Germany) Tim Neuser (United States) Andreas Gabler (Italy) Marco Ferraro	Porsche Cayman GT4 CS	58
DNF	SP3	121	(United Arab Emirates) Roadrunner Racing	(Germany) Jürgen Peter (Japan) Junichi Umemoto (Japan) Kouichi Okmura	Renault Clio Cup	58
DNF	Kl. Cup	245	(Germany) Team Avia Sorg Rennsport	(Spain) Joaquin Capsi Segura (Spain) Alvaro Fontes (Spain) Antonio Castillo (Spain) Guillermo Aso	BMW M240i Racing	55
DNF	Kl. Cup	238	(Germany) Walkenhorst Motorsport	(Germany) Michael Mohr (New Zealand) Guy Stewart (Germany) Florian Weber (Germany) Jörg Breuer	BMW M240i Racing	55
DNF	SP4T	159	(Germany) Köppen Motorsport	(Germany) Franco Arcidiancone (Germany) Axel Wiegner (Netherlands) Marco Van Ramshorst (Germany) Alexander Müller	Porsche Cayman 718 GTS	53
DNF	SP9 PRO	2	(Germany) Mercedes-AMG Team Black Falcon	(United Kingdom) Adam Christodoulou (Germany) Maro Engel (Germany) Manuel Metzger (Germany) Dirk Müller	Mercedes-AMG GT3	49
DNF	SP8	49	(Germany) rent2Drive-Familia-racing	(Germany) David Ackermann (Russia) Dmitriy Lukovnikov (Hungary) Csaba Walter (Germany) Jörg Wiskirchen	Porsche 991 GT3 Cup MR	49
DNF	Cup-X	111	(Germany) Teichmann Racing GmbH	(Austria) Laura Kraihamer (Austria) Reinhard Kofler (Germany) Maik Rönnefarth (Germany) "Maximilian"	KTM X-BOW GT4	48
DNF	SP9 PRO	38	(Hong Kong) KCMG	(Germany) Philipp Wlazik (Germany) Christian Menzel (Brazil) João Paulo de Oliveira (Australia) Josh Burdon	Nissan GT-R Nismo GT3 2018	40
DNF	V4	157	(Germany) Team Avia Sorg Rennsport	(Germany) Jürgen Huber (Germany) Simon Sagmeister (Germany) Andreas Schmidt (Germany) Cyril Kalbassi	BMW M3 Sedan (E90)	39
DNF	V6	135	(Germany) Team Mathol Racing e.V	(Germany) Wolfgang Weber (Argentina) Roberto Falcon (Germany) Daniel Schwerfeld	Porsche Cayman S	35
DNF	SP9-LG	50	(Switzerland) Team Speedline Racing by Ronal Group	(Germany) Peter Posavac (Germany) Rolf Scheibner (Germany) Dirk Heldmann (Germany) Jörg Müller	BMW Z4 GT3	35
DNF	SP9	42	(Germany) BMW Team Schnitzer	(Brazil) Augusto Farfus (Germany) Martin Tomczyk (South Africa) Sheldon van der Linde (Germany) Timo Scheider	BMW M6 GT3	29
DNF	V6	134	(Germany) Team Avia Sorg Rennsport	(Italy) Alberto Carobbio (Italy) Ugo Vicenzi (South Korea) Jang Han Choi (Switzerland) Stefan Meier	Eibach-Porsche Cayman S	28
DNF	SP8T	54	(Germany) Team Avia Sorg Rennsport	(Denmark) Niels Borum (New Zealand) Michael Eden (New Zealand) Wayne Moore	HS Gebäudetechnik-BMW 325i	25
DNF	SP9	98	(Germany) Rowe Racing	(Austria) Philipp Eng (United States) Connor De Phillippi (United Kingdom) Tom Blomqvist (Denmark) Mikkel Jensen	BMW M6 GT3	22
DNF	SP3	117	(Germany) MSC Adenau	(Germany) Tobias Overbeck (Germany) Daniel Overbeck (Germany) Thomas Overbeck (Germany) Michael Lindmayer	Renault Clio RS	22
DNF	SP8	35	(United Kingdom) AMR Performance Centre	(Germany) Marco Müller (New Zealand) Tony Richards (United States) David Thilenius (Germany) Heinz Jürgen Kroner	Aston Martin Vantage GT8	21
DNF	SP3	86	(Japan) Toyota Gazoo Racing	(Japan) Hisashi Yabuki (Belgium) Herwig Daenens	Toyota GT86 Cup	21
DNF	V2T	161	(Germany) rent2Drive-Familia-racing	(Germany) Axel Jahn (Germany) Oliver Greven (Germany) Andrei Sidorenko (Germany) Thomas Müller	Renault Megane RS	20
DNF	SP8T	40	(Germany) Schubert Motorsport	(Germany) Christopher Dreyspring (Netherlands) Ricardo van der Ende (Germany) Christopher Brück	BMW M2 Competition	19
DNF	V6	131	(Germany) Pixum Team Adrenalin Motorsport	(Germany) Christian Büllesbach (Germany) Andreas Schettler (Germany) Ioannis Smyrlis (Spain) Carlos Arimon	Porsche Cayman S	19
DNF	SP9	55	(Switzerland) Octane 126 Sponsor: Serliana	(Germany) Björn Grossmann (Switzerland) Simon Trummer (Switzerland) Jonathan Hirschi (Switzerland) Alexander Prinz	Ferrari 488 GT3	13
DNF	SP9	101	(Germany) Walkenhorst Motorsport	(Norway) Christian Krognes (United Kingdom) David Pittard (Spain) Lucas Ordóñez (United Kingdom) Nick Yelloly	BMW M6 GT3	10
DNF	SP9	99	(Germany) Rowe Racing	(Netherlands) Nicky Catsburg (Germany) Marco Wittmann (Finland) Jesse Krohn (United States) John Edwards	BMW M6 GT3	8
DNF	SP 6	82	(Switzerland) Hofor-Racing	(Switzerland) Martin Kroll (Switzerland) Michael Kroll (Switzerland) Alexander Prinz (Netherlands) Christiaan Frankenhout	BMW M3 GTR	1
DSQ	SP9 Pro	911	(Germany) Manthey Racing	(New Zealand) Earl Bamber (Denmark) Michael Christensen (France) Kévin Estre (Belgium) Laurens Vanthoor	Porsche 911 GT3 R (19)	156 (Note: Manthey Racing #911 was disqualified after the car was found to have exceeded the 494 hp limit stipulated in the Balance of Performance. The car finished second prior to the disqualification.)
DNS	V4	158	(Germany) Team Avia Sorg Rennsport	(Turkey) Ersin Yücesan (Turkey) Emir Aşarı (Germany) Lucas Schmidt (Switzerland) Mark Benz	BGStechnic-BMW 325i	0
DNS	SP3	119	Toyota Gazoo Racing Team Thailand	(Thailand) Suttipong Smittachartch (Thailand) Nattavude Charoensukhawatana (Thailand) Nattapong Hortongkum (Thailand) Manat Kulapalanont	Toyota C-HR Cup	0
DNS	SP7	59	(United States) CP Racing	(United States) Charles Putman (United States) Charles Espenlaub (United States) Joe Foster (Belgium) Xavier Maassen	Porsche 991 GT3 Cup Gen 2 (19)	0

== Bibliography ==
- Jörg-Richard Ufer & Tim Upietz. 24 Stunden Nürburgring Nordschleife 2019. Gruppe C Motorsport Verlag. ISBN 978-3-928540-99-5.
