= 2013 Formula BMW Talent Cup =

Seasons
- ← 2012 none →

The 2013 Formula BMW Talent Cup was the third and final Formula BMW Talent Cup season.

== Drivers ==
No.	Driver
2	(Switzerland) David Droux
4	(Netherlands) Jules Szymkowiak
3	(South Africa) Michael Philip Wolf
5	(Australia) James Allen
6	(Sweden) Robin Hansson
8	(Turkey) Kaan Önder
9	(Germany) Florian Stüger
11	(Germany) Nico Menzel
12	(Germany) Vivianne Mainusch
14	(Israel) Bar Baruch
15	(Germany) Michael Waldherr

== Race calendar ==
Round		Circuit	Date	Winning driver
1	R1	(Austria) Red Bull Ring, Spielberg	10–11 July	(Netherlands) Jules Szymkowiak
1	R2	(Austria) Red Bull Ring, Spielberg	10–11 July	(Netherlands) Jules Szymkowiak
2	R1	Automotodróm Slovakia Ring, Orechová Potôň	6–8 August	(Netherlands) Jules Szymkowiak
2	R2	Automotodróm Slovakia Ring, Orechová Potôň	6–8 August	(Netherlands) Jules Szymkowiak
2	R3	Automotodróm Slovakia Ring, Orechová Potôň	6–8 August	(Turkey) Kaan Önder
3	R1	(Hungary) Hungaroring, Budapest	16–18 August	(Turkey) Kaan Önder
3	R2	(Hungary) Hungaroring, Budapest	16–18 August	(Germany) Nico Menzel
Grand Final
4	R1	(Germany) Motorsport Arena Oschersleben	13–15 September	(Sweden) Robin Hansson
4	R2	(Germany) Motorsport Arena Oschersleben	13–15 September	(Germany) Nico Menzel
4	R3	(Germany) Motorsport Arena Oschersleben	13–15 September	(Germany) Michael Waldherr

== Championship standings ==
Pos.	Driver	Points
Grand Final
1	(Sweden) Robin Hansson	49
2	(Germany) Nico Menzel	40
3	(Germany) Michael Waldherr	39
4	(Germany) Florian Stüger	37
5	(Australia) James Allen	31
6	(Netherlands) Jules Szymkowiak	30
7	(Turkey) Kaan Önder	28
8	(Switzerland) David Droux	20
9	(Israel) Bar Baruch	18
10	(South Africa) Michael Philip Wolf	5
11	(Germany) Vivianne Mainusch	4
	(Germany) Valentin Zimmermann	
Pos.	Driver	Points
