= Jules Szymkowiak =

Dutch racing driver (born 1995

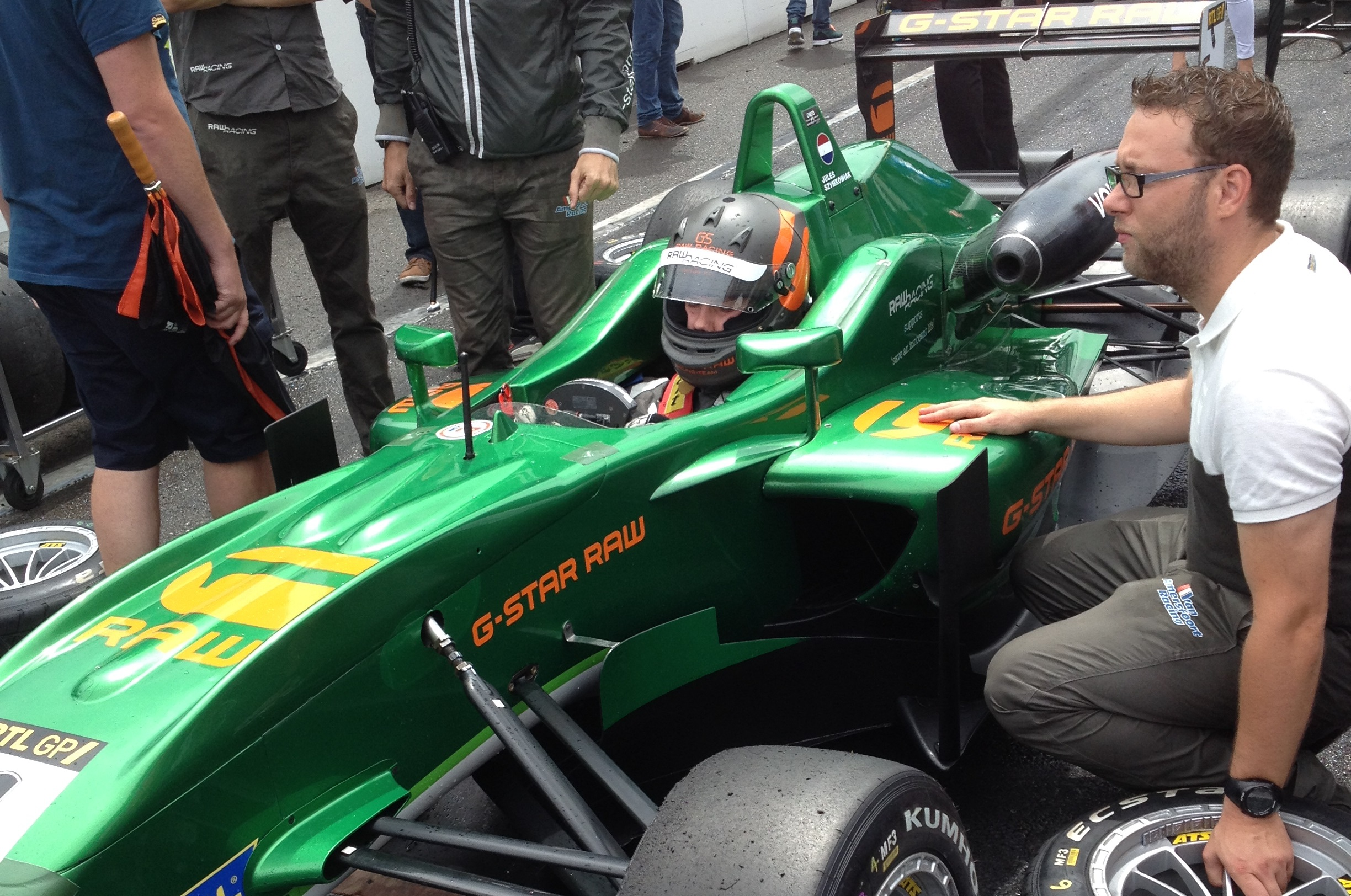
- Nationality: (Netherlands) Dutch
- Born: 1 October 1995 (age 31) Heerlen, Limburg
- Categorisation: FIA Silver

Previous series
- 2014 2013: FIA F3 Europe; Formula BMW

Championship titles
- 2015 and 2017: Blancpain GT Silver Cup

Awards
- Sean Edwards Trophy (2016)

Jules Szymkowiak (born 1 October 1995 in Heerlen, Limburg) is a Dutch racing driver. After competing in the FIA Formula 3 European Championship he transferred to GT-racing in various GT3 championships.

== Career ==
=== Single seaters ===
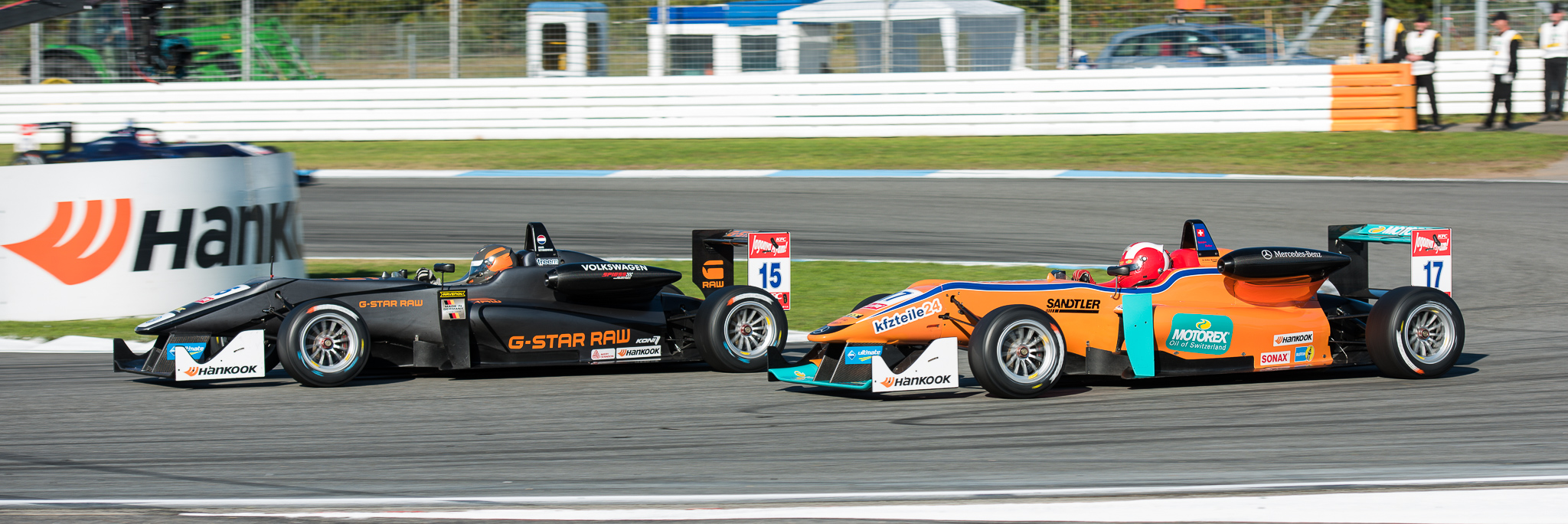
Szymkowiak (left) at the Hockenheimring in 2014.

After karting in various Rotax Max powered classes, Szymkowiak was selected to compete in the Formula BMW Talent Cup in 2013. The Dutch driver won four races during the season, two at the Red Bull Ring and two at the Slovakia Ring. At the championship Grand Final at Motorsport Arena Oschersleben, Szymkowiak finished second in the first race, retired in the second race, and placed sixth in the third race. He had to settle for sixth in the overall standings.

For 2014, Szymkowiak was announced to race with Van Amersfoort Racing in the FIA Formula 3 European Championship. Former Formula One driver Adrian Sutil advised on Szymkowiak transitioning into Formula 3. At the Hungaroring, Szymkowiak scored his best result of sixth. During the season, he scored seventeen points placing twentieth in the series.

=== GT racing ===
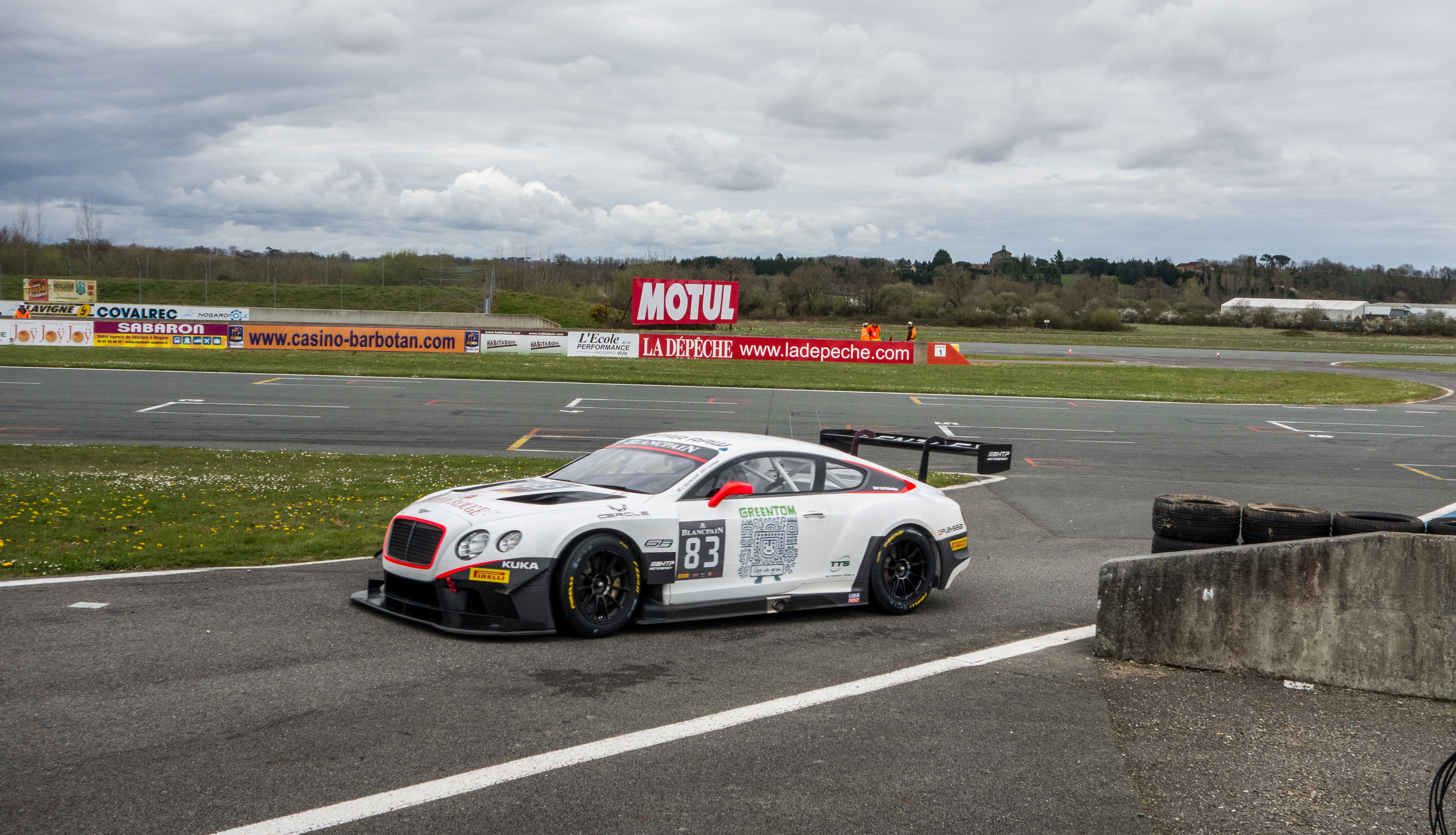
Szymkowiak at Nogaro 2015.

Szymkowiak made his GT3 racing debut with HTP Motorsport in a Bentley Continental GT. The rookie landed his HTP racing seat by filling in an application form. In the 2015 Blancpain Sprint Series, he shared his car with three different drivers during the season, Olivier Lombard, Tom Dillmann and Max van Splunteren. In the overall classification, Szymkowiak scored a couple of sixth places as his best result. As a silver graded driver, he qualified for the Silver Cup. In the Silver Cup, he scored nine class victories out of thirteen races dominating the championship. To qualify to race GT3 machinery in the VLN and the 24 Hours of Nürburgring, Szymkowiak needed a DMSB Permit Nordschleife Grade A. To receive the permit, Szymkowiak raced in the 2015 DMV Münsterlandpokal entered on two cars, one BMW M235i and one Honda Civic Type-R. With HTP Motorsport switching to the new Mercedes-AMG GT, Szymkowiak got a new teammate for the Blancpain GT Sprint Series, Bernd Schneider. The duo won their first race at Brands Hatch. The duo scored another two podium finishes placing them fourth in the series championship. As a rising talent, he won the Sean Edwards Trophy, over other finalists Dries Vanthoor and Luca Stolz. For 2017, Szymkowiak partnered with Fabian Schiller again qualifying to compete in the Silver Cup classification. The duo scored a second place overall finish at the season opener at Misano. They also won the Silver Cup classification seven times, again winning the championship.

== Racing record ==
=== Career summary ===
Season	Series	Team	Races	Wins	Poles	F/Laps	Podiums	Points	Position
2013	Formula BMW Talent Cup	BMW Motorsport	3	0	?	?	1	30	6th
2014	FIA Formula 3 European Championship	Van Amersfoort Racing	33	0	0	0	0	17	20th
2014	Zandvoort Masters	Van Amersfoort Racing	1	0	0	0	0	N/A	5th
2015	Blancpain GT Sprint Series	Bentley Team HTP	13	0	0	0	0	18	18th
2016	Blancpain GT Series Sprint Cup	HTP Motorsport	10	1	0	2	3	59	4th
2017	Blancpain GT Series Sprint Cup	HTP Motorsport	10	0	0	0	1	22	11th
2017	Blancpain GT Series Asia - GT3	GruppeM Racing Team	11	0	0	0	0	82	5th
2017	International GT Open	SPS Automotive Performance	2	0	0	0	0	0	NC
2018	Blancpain GT Series Endurance Cup	AKKA ASP Team	5	0	0	0	0	0	NC
2019	ADAC GT4 Germany	Racing One	2	0	0	0	0	0	NC
2019	24 Hours of Nürburgring - SP9	GetSpeed Performance	1	0	0	0	0	N/A	6th
2020	24 Hours of Nürburgring - SP9	Hella Pagid - racing one	1	0	0	0	0	N/A	18th
2022	24 Hours of Nürburgring - SP9	Hella Pagid - racing one	1	0	0	0	0	N/A	DNF
2025	Ultimate Cup European Series - GT Endurance Cup - Porsche Cup	Driv'n							

=== Complete FIA European Formula 3 Championship results ===
(key)

Year	Entrant	Engine	1	2	3	4	5	6	7	8	9	10	11	12	13	14	15	16	17	18	19	20	21	22	23	24	25	26	27	28	29	30	31	32	33	DC	Points
2014	Van Amersfoort Racing	Volkswagen	SIL; 1; 19	SIL; 2; 24	SIL; 3; 20	HOC; 1 Ret	HOC; 2; 16	HOC; 3; 16	PAU; 1; 19	PAU; 2 Ret	PAU; 3; 14	HUN; 1; 6	HUN; 2; 19	HUN; 3; 15	SPA; 1; 9	SPA; 2 Ret	SPA; 3; 8	NOR; 1; 18	NOR; 2 Ret	NOR; 3 Ret	MSC; 1; 11	MSC; 2; 12	MSC; 3; 13	RBR; 1 Ret	RBR; 2; 9	RBR; 3; 15	NÜR; 1; 17	NÜR; 2; 14	NÜR; 3; 10	IMO; 1 Ret	IMO; 2; 15	IMO; 3; 14	HOC; 1; 22	HOC; 2; 15	HOC; 3; 20	20th	17

=== Complete Blancpain GT Series Sprint Cup results ===
Year	Team	Car	Class	1	2	3	4	5	6	7	8	9	10	11	12	13	14	Pos.	Points
2015	Bentley Team HTP	Bentley Continental GT3	Silver	NOG; QR; Ret	NOG; CR; 14	BRH; QR; 13	BRH; CR; 12	ZOL; QR; 8	ZOL; CR; 6	MOS; QR; 8	MOS; CR; 10	ALG; QR; 8	ALG; CR; Ret	MIS; QR; Ret	MIS; CR; DNS	ZAN; QR; 7	ZAN; CR; 6	18th	18
2016	HTP Motorsport	Mercedes-AMG GT3	Pro	MIS; QR; Ret	MIS; CR; 7	BRH; QR; 1	BRH; CR; 2	NÜR; QR; 8	NÜR; CR; 3	HUN; QR; 5	HUN; CR; 5	CAT; QR; 10	CAT; CR; 31					4th	59
2017	HTP Motorsport	Mercedes-AMG GT3	Silver	MIS; QR; 2	MIS; CR; 12	BRH; QR; 16	BRH; CR; 17	ZOL; QR; 17	ZOL; CR; 8	HUN; QR; 14	HUN; CR; 8	NÜR; CR; 9	NÜR; CR; 6					11th	22

=== Complete Blancpain Endurance Series results ===
Year	Team	Car	Class	1	2	3	4	5	Pos.	Pts
2016	HTP Motorsport	Mercedes-AMG GT3	Pro	MON	SIL	LEC; Ret	SPA	NÜR	-	0
