= BMW M6 =

High performance version of the BMW 6 Series

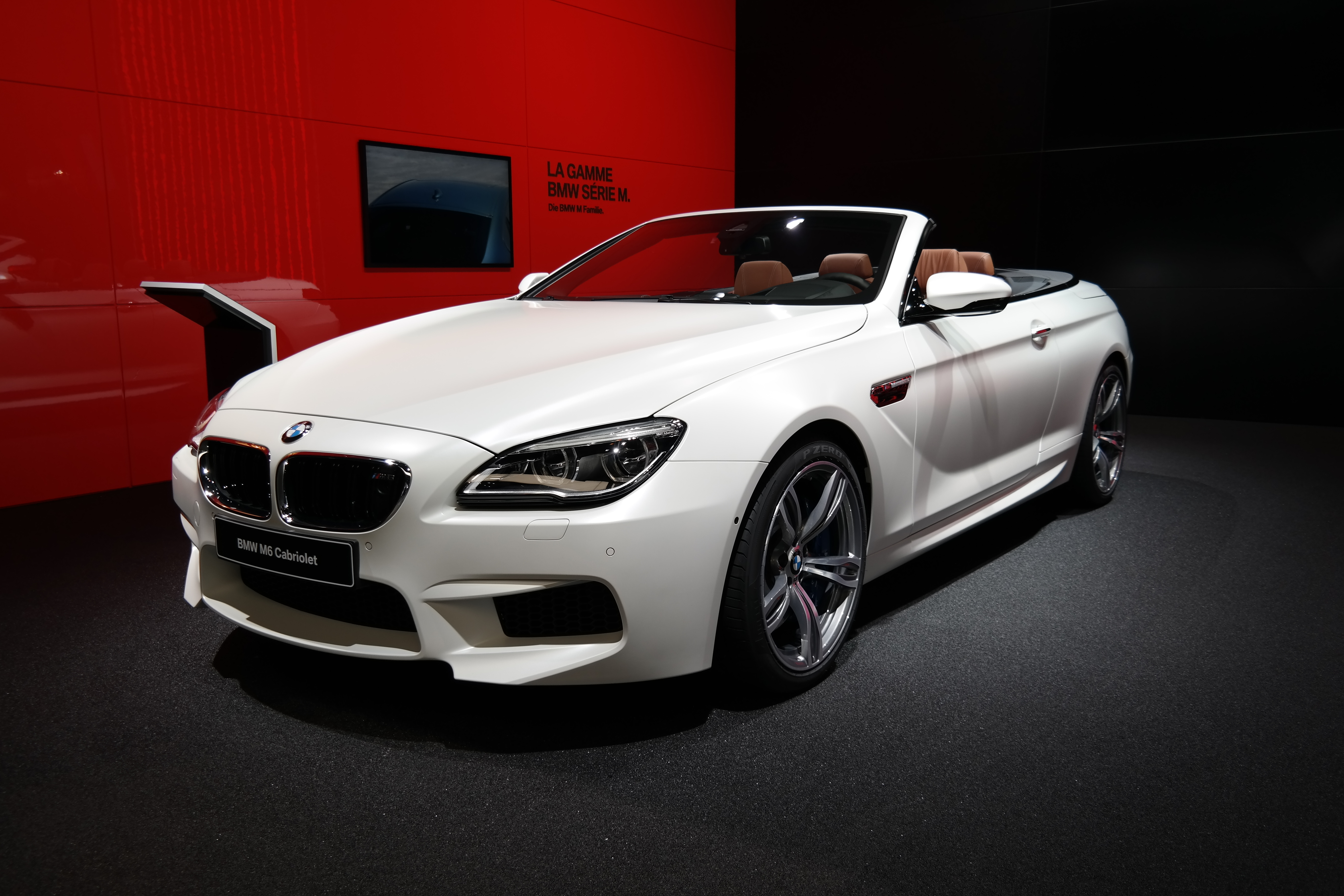

Overview
- Manufacturer: BMW M
- Production: 1983–1989; 2005–2019
- Assembly: Germany: Dingolfing

Body and chassis
- Class: Grand tourer (S)
- Layout: Front-engine, rear-wheel-drive
- Related: BMW 6 Series; BMW M5

Chronology
- Successor: BMW M8 (F91/F92/F93)

The BMW M6 is a high-performance version of the 6 Series marketed under the BMW M sub-brand from 1983 to 2019 (with a hiatus from 1990 to 2004).

Introduced in the coupe body style, the M6 was also built in convertible and fastback sedan ('Gran Coupe') body styles for later generations. An M6 model was built for each of the first three generations of the 6 Series. Production of the M6 ended in 2019 and it was replaced by the BMW M8 in 2019.

== E24 M635CSi/M6 (1983–1989) ==
BMW M635CSi / M6 (E24)
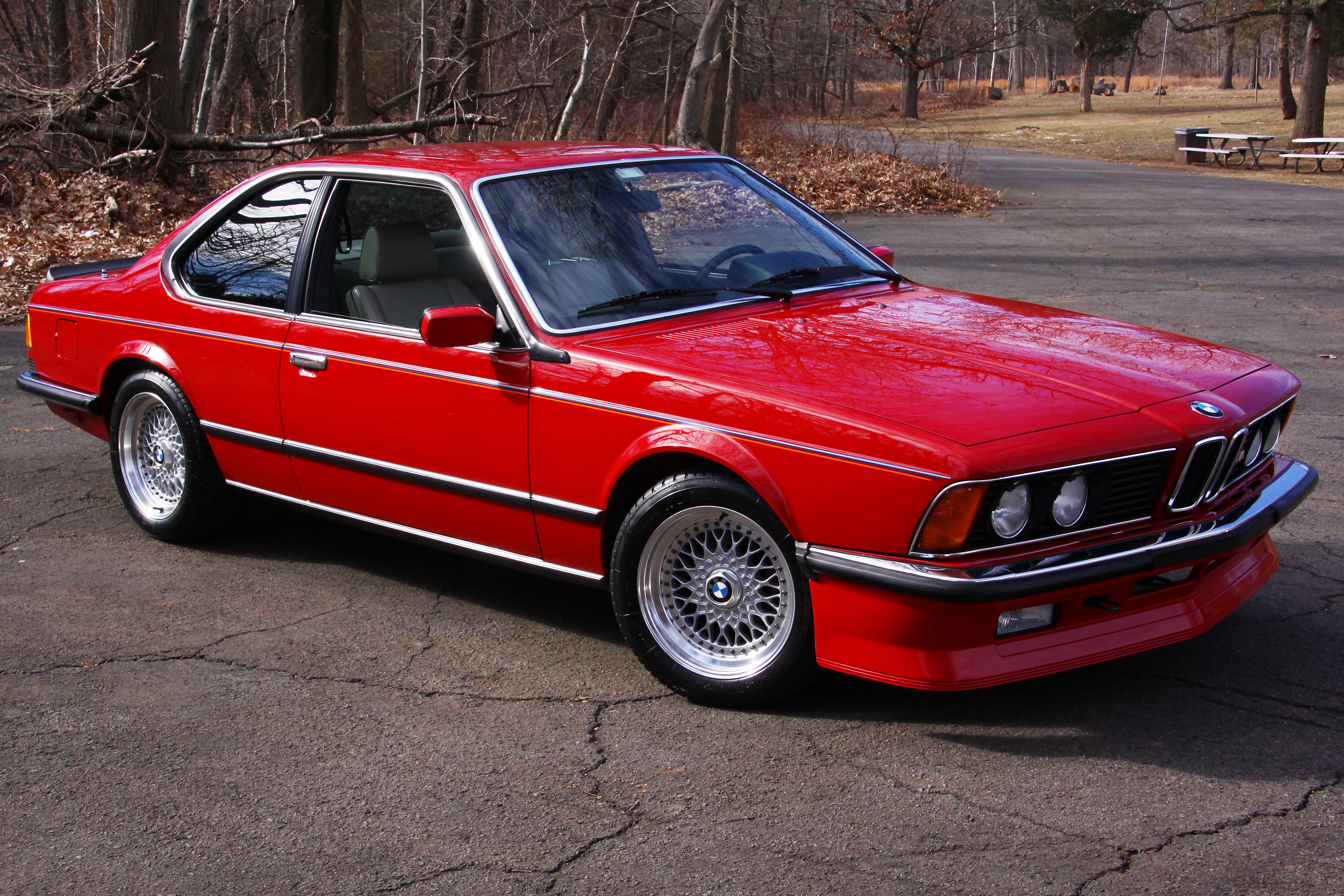

Overview
- Production: 1983–1989
- Designer: Paul Bracq

Body and chassis
- Body style: 2-door coupé
- Layout: Front-engine, rear-wheel-drive

Powertrain
- Engine: 3.5 L M88/S38 I6
- Transmission: 5-speed manual

Dimensions
- Wheelbase: 2,620 mm (103 in)
- Length: 4,755 mm (187.2 in) (Note: 4,923 mm (193.8 in) for U.S. models)
- Width: 1,725 mm (67.9 in)
- Height: 1,354 mm (53.3 in)

The M6 lineage began in 1983 with the M635CSi model of the E24 6 Series range, which was powered by the M88/3 DOHC straight-six engine (which was a modified version of the engine used in the BMW M1). In most countries, the model was badged the M635CSi, however the equivalent model in North America and Japan was simply badged as "M6".

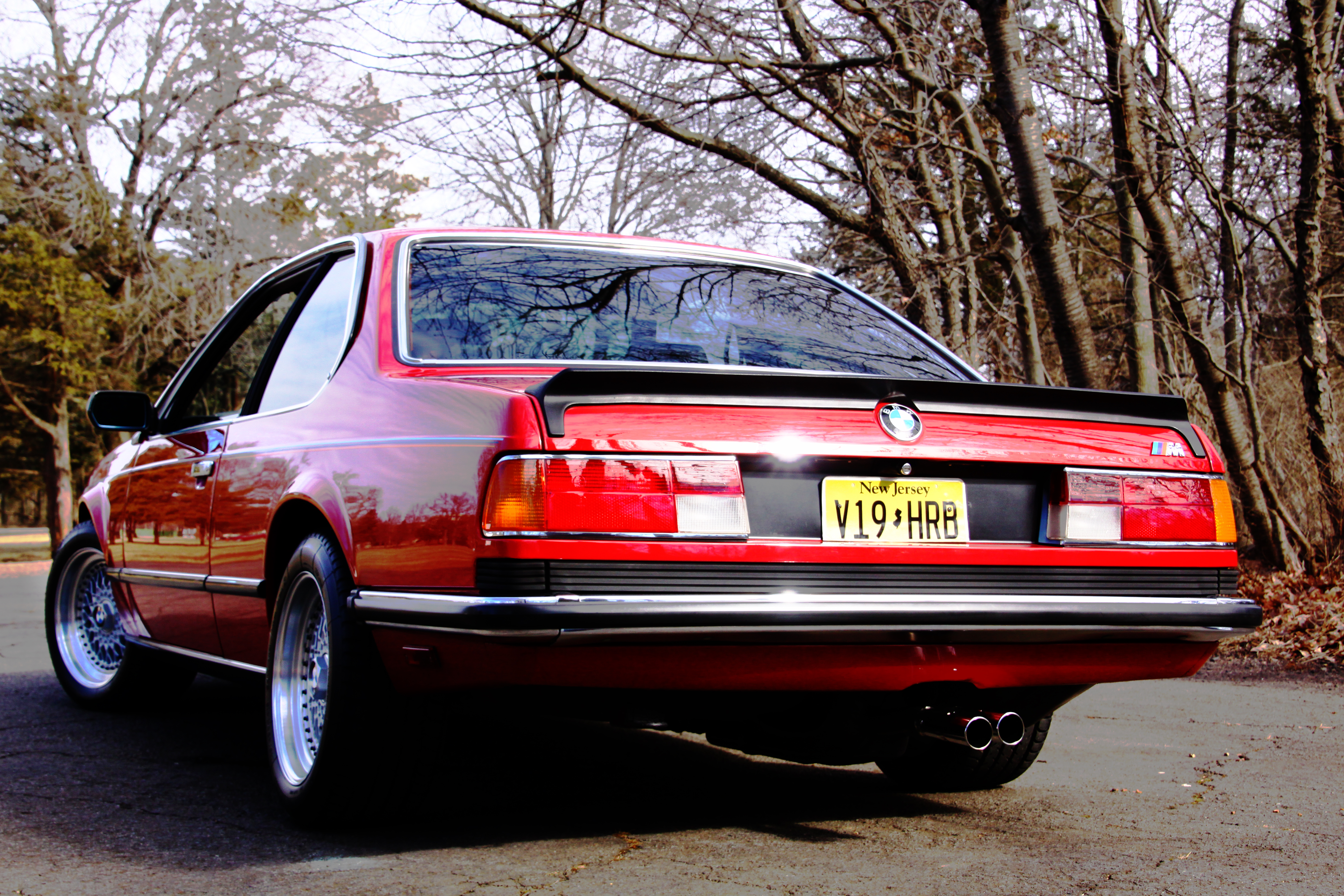
Rear view

The European-specification M635CSi used the M88/3 engine (without a catalytic converter), which produced 210 kW (286 PS; 282 hp) at 6,500 rpm and 340 N⋅m (251 lb⋅ft) at 4,500 rpm. The M6 version, sold in North America and Japan, used the S38B35 engine (with catalytic converter), which produced 256 hp (191 kW; 260 PS) and 330 N⋅m (243 lb⋅ft) at the same engine speeds. The catalyzed engine was also used in European and other market cars beginning in the summer of 1987, with identical specifications to the federalized engine. The sole transmission for all models was a 5-speed Getrag 280 manual transmission.

Other changes included BBS RS wheels, a rear lip spoiler, a larger front air dam, larger front brakes and revised suspension with a 10 mm (0.4 in) lower ride height.

The E24 series became a "world car" for the 1988 and 1989 model years, sporting the same bumpers and aerodynamic treatments as its high-performance counterparts across all markets.

According to BMW, the car can accelerate from 0–97 km/h (0–60 mph) in 5.8 and 6.8 seconds for the European and North American versions respectively. The curb weights of the 1987 models are 1,515 kg (3,340 lb) for the M635 CSi and 1,619 kg (3,569 lb) for the M6. A top speed of 255 km/h (158 mph) made the European M635CSi the second fastest BMW automobile ever built at the time, next to the M1. The quarter mile time for the M635 CSi has been recorded at 14.5 seconds while 161 km/h (100 mph) is achieved in 15 seconds.

A total of 5,855 cars were produced. Of these, 1,677 cars were imported to North America. Due to the elongated front and rear bumpers, the length of the U.S. models is 4,923 mm (193.8 in).

Production of the E24 M635CSi/M6 ended in 1989.

== E63/64 M6 (2005–2011) ==
BMW M6 (E63/E64)
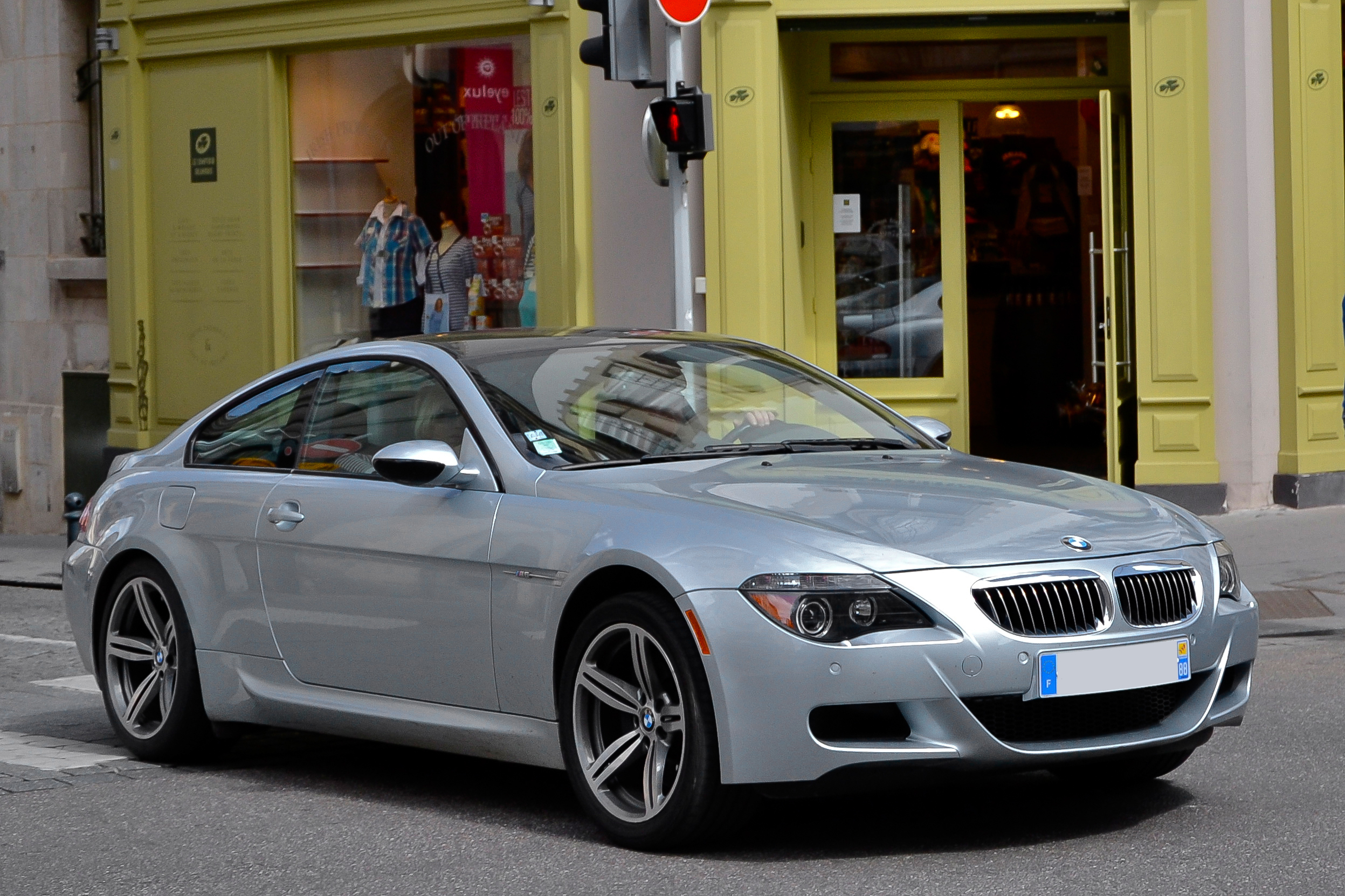

Overview
- Production: 2005–2011
- Designer: Adrian van Hooydonk

Body and chassis
- Body style: 2-door coupé (E63); 2-door convertible (E64)
- Layout: Front-engine, rear-wheel-drive

Powertrain
- Engine: 5.0 L S85 petrol V10
- Transmission: 7-speed SMG-III; 6-speed manual (U.S. only)

Dimensions
- Wheelbase: 2,781 mm (109.5 in)
- Length: 4,872 mm (191.8 in)
- Width: 1,854 mm (73.0 in)
- Height: 1,377 mm (54.2 in)

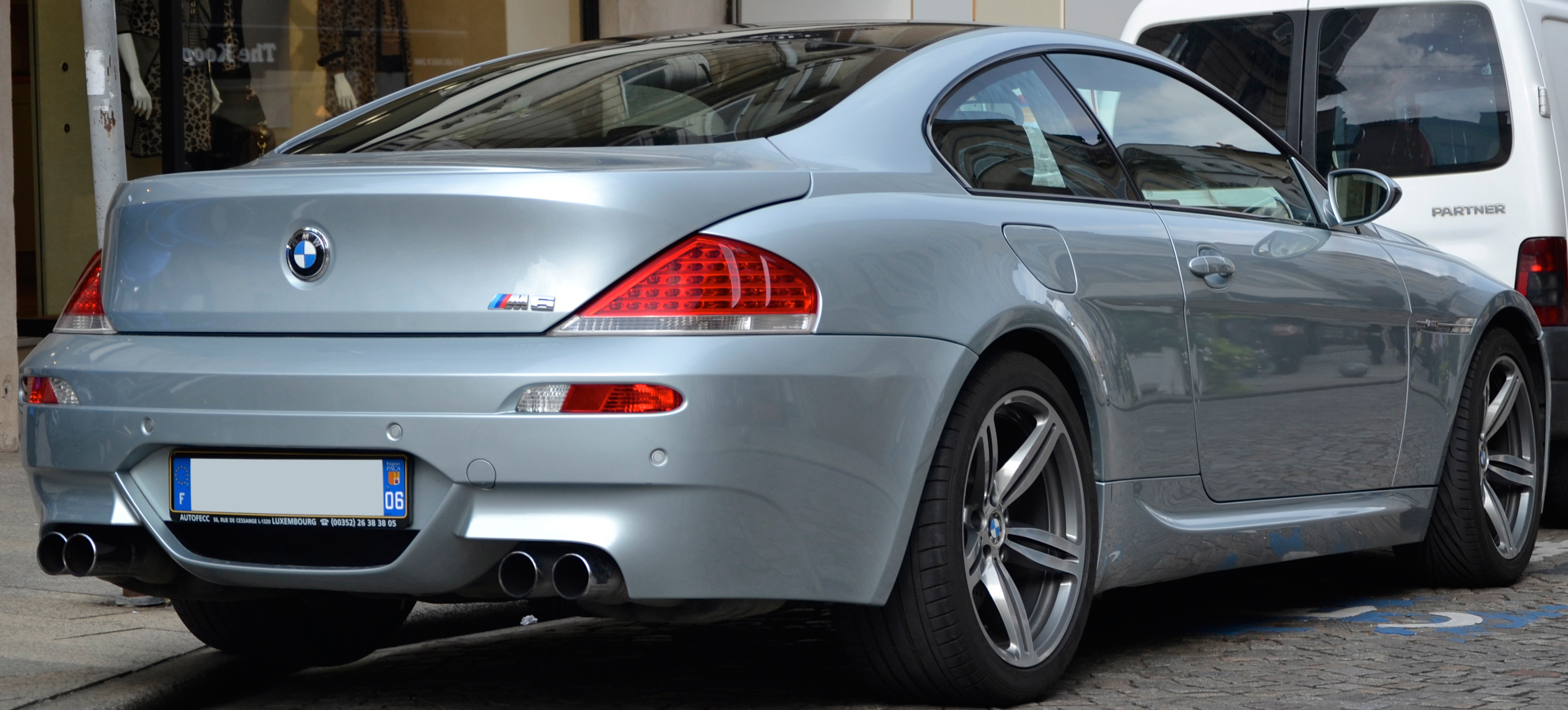
Coupe

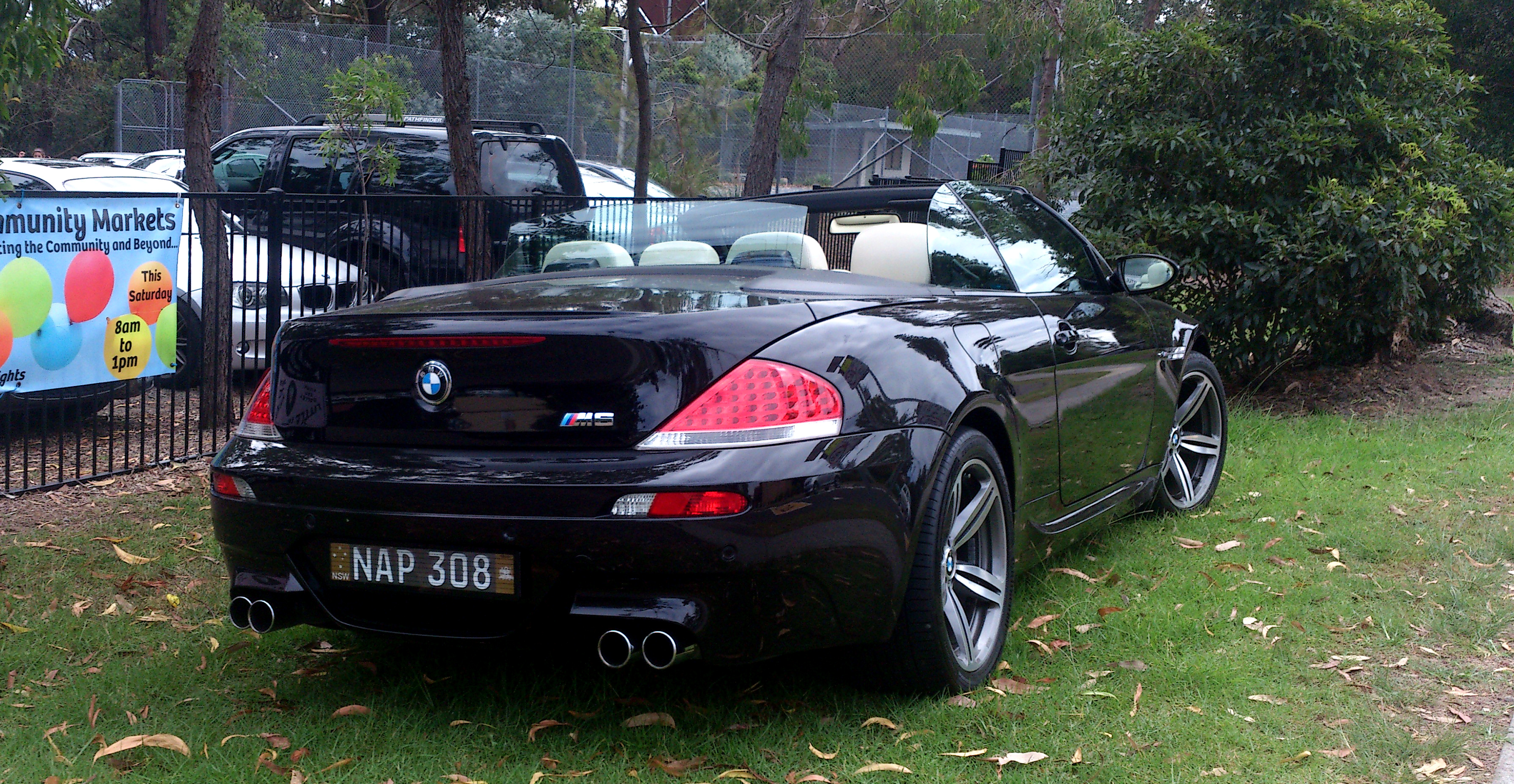
Convertible

Following a hiatus in M6 production for 16 years, the M6 version of the E63/E64 6 Series was introduced in 2005. The M6 uses the same BMW S85 V10 engine and SMG-III automated manual gearbox as the E60 M5.

The M6 was produced as both a coupé (E63 model code) and a convertible (E64 model code). The exterior styling was overseen by Karl Elmitt.

The M6 had two modes for engine power: a "P400" mode in which the engine has a rated power output of 294 kW (394 hp) and a "P500" mode in which the engine has a rated power output of 373 kW (500 hp). Manufacturer claimed performance included a 0–100 km/h (62 mph) acceleration time of 4.6 seconds. The top speed was electronically limited to 250 km/h (155 mph) or 305 km/h (190 mph) if the optional M-driver's package is fitted.

The coupe version weighs 1,785 kg (3,935 lb), and the convertible version weighs 2,005 kg (4,420 lb). Weight reduction measures include a (coupe-only) carbon fibre roof (a first for a regular BMW production model, last used on the E46 M3 CSL), thermoplastic quarter panels, aluminium doors, aluminium bonnet and a thermo-fibre plastic boot lid.

From 2007 a 6-speed manual gearbox was offered in North America, only 701 examples were produced with a manual gearbox (323 Coupes and 378 Convertibles).

In September 2010, BMW announced they had ended production of the M6, with sales over the five-year run totalling 9,087 for the coupe and 5,065 for the convertible.

=== Competition Package ===
From 2009 a Competition Package was offered which included front and rear suspension lowered by 12mm and 10mm respectively, wider wheels with Pirelli P Zero Corsa tyres, and optimised ABS, stability control and M Differential settings to improve cornering. On the exterior, the Competition Package features a new bonnet with ‘precision lines’ as well as redesigned wheels.

=== Competition Special Edition ===
In 2009, simultaneously presented with the Competition Package, a special edition of only 100 units was announced. All of the 100 units received the name BMW M6 Competition and include the Competition Package, plus a special matte paint color for the exterior named 'Frozen Gray Metallic'. The interior uses a special trim of Merino leather in either light gray two-tone finish with contrasting stitching or black. All cars included custom floor mats with ‘M6 Competition’ labelling.

== F06/F12/F13 M6 (2012–2019) ==
BMW M6 (F06/F12/F13)
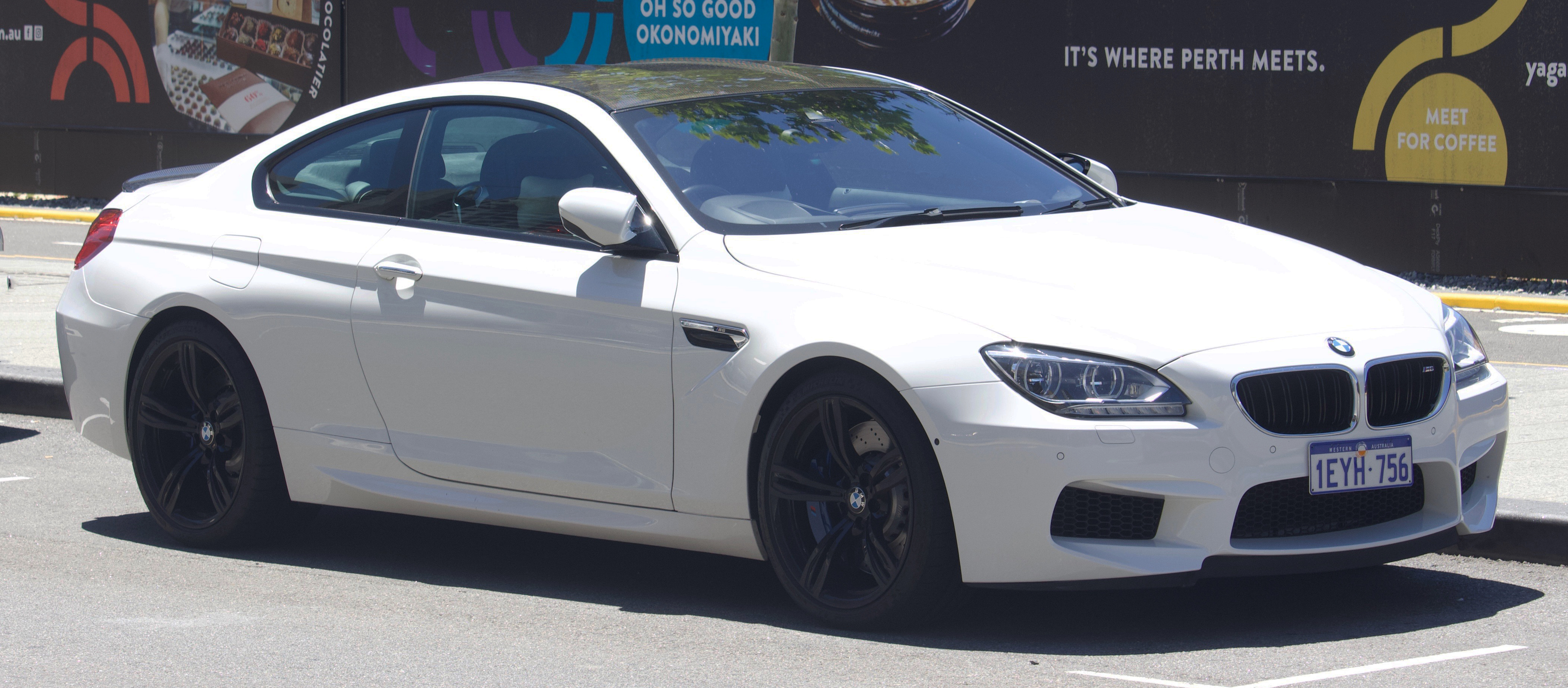

Overview
- Production: 2012–2019
- Model years: 2013–2019
- Designer: Nader Faghihzadeh

Body and chassis
- Body style: 2-door convertible (F12); 2-door coupé (F13); 4-door sedan (F06 "Gran Coupe")
- Layout: Front-engine, rear-wheel-drive

Powertrain
- Engine: 4.4 L S63 twin-turbo petrol V8
- Transmission: 7-speed dual-clutch; 6-speed manual

Dimensions
- Wheelbase: 2,850 mm (112.2 in)
- Length: 4,897 mm (192.8 in)
- Width: 1,919 mm (75.56 in)
- Height: 1,369 mm (53.9 in)

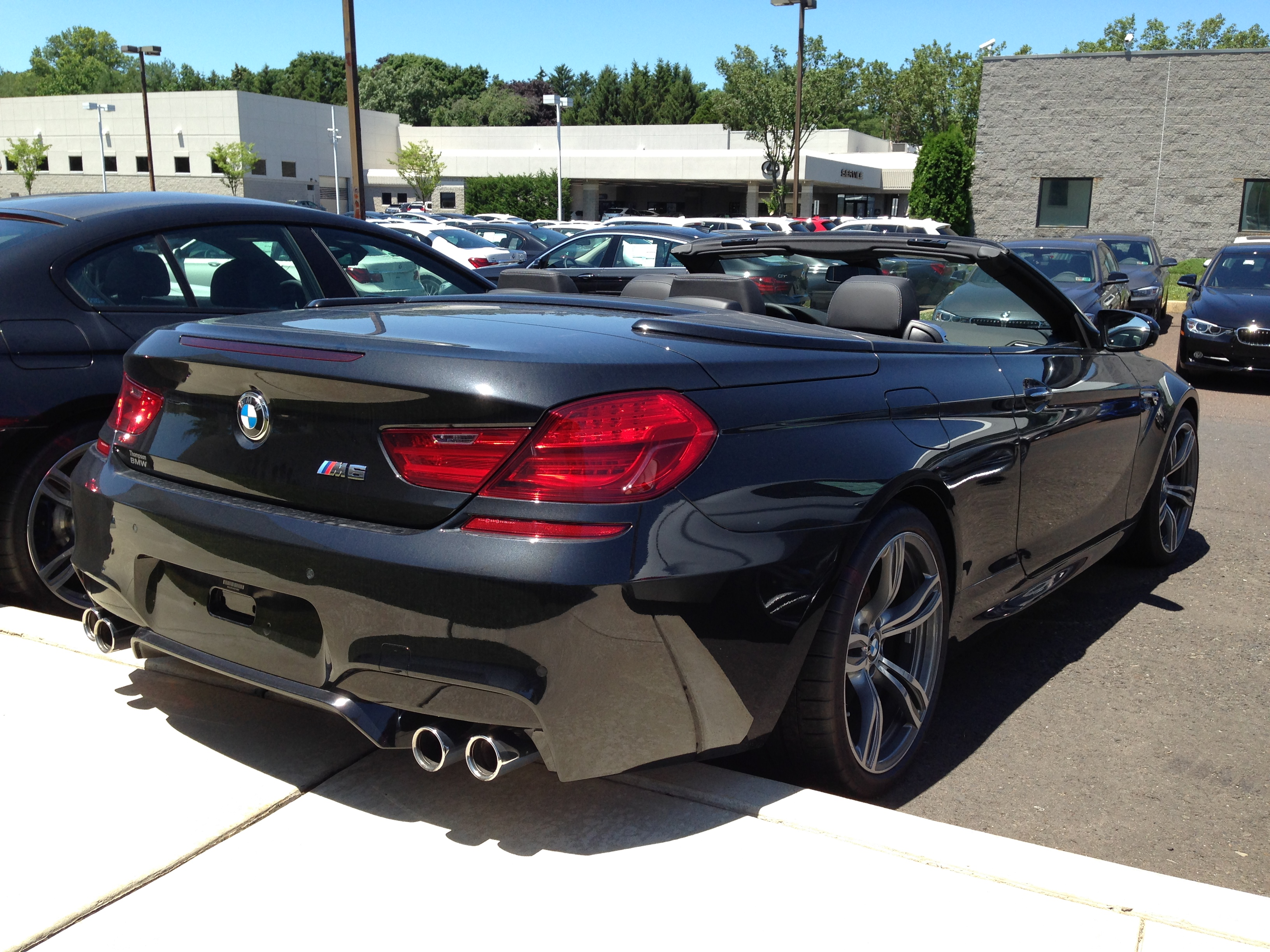
F12 Convertible

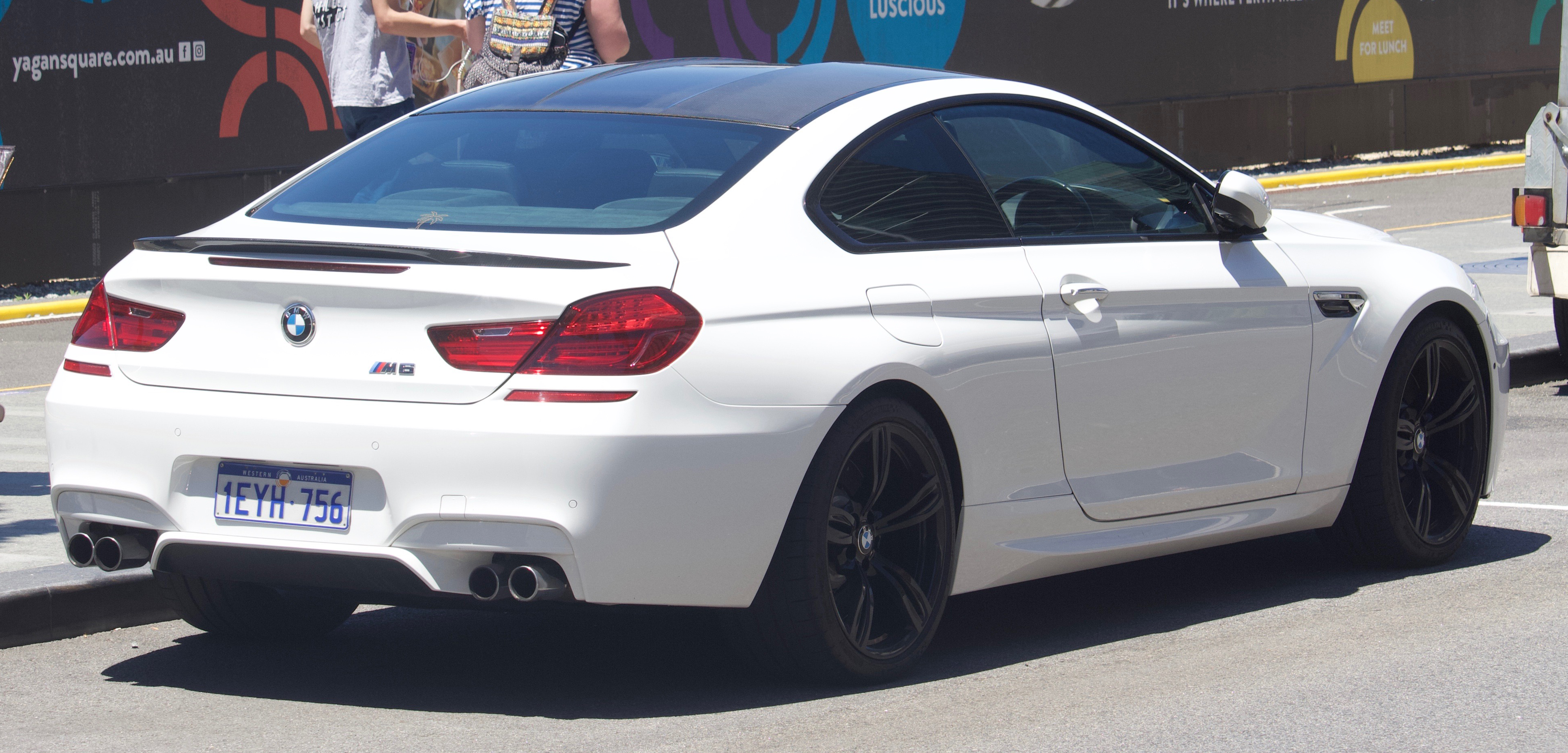
F13 Coupé

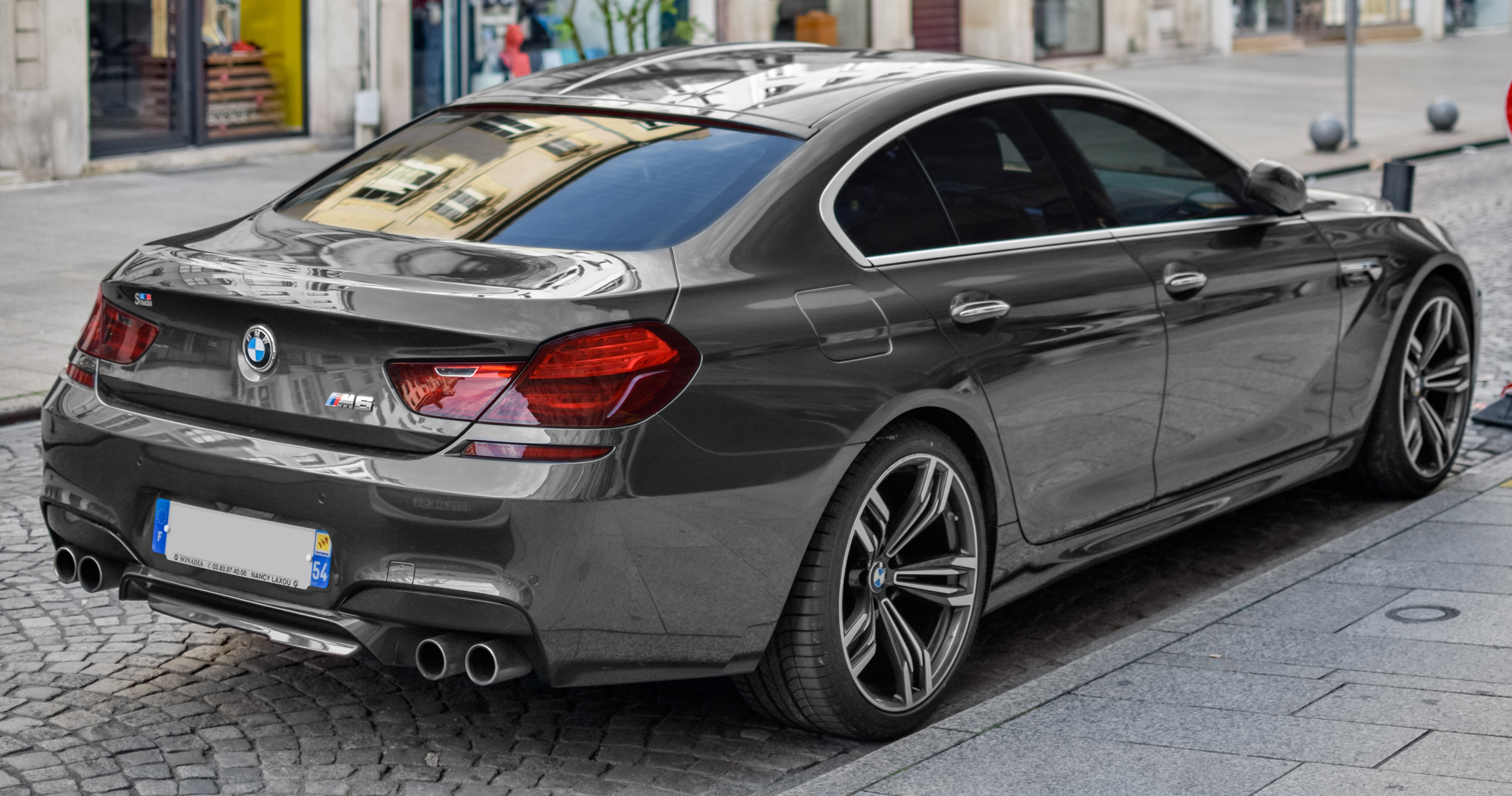
F06 Gran Coupé

The new model is based on the F12/F13/F06 6 Series, and shares its 7-speed dual clutch ("M-DCT") transmission and BMW S63 twin-turbo V8 engine with the F10 M5.

The official performance figures state the acceleration time from 0–100 km/h (0–62 mph) in 4.2 seconds for the coupe and Gran Coupé, and 4.3 seconds for the convertible. The top speed is electronically limited to 250 km/h (155 mph), or 305 km/h (190 mph) with the optional M-driver's package. The differential is an electronically actuated ("Active M") limited slip differential. The curb weight for the coupe is 1,850 kg (4,070 lb). The curb weight of the convertible is 2,055 kg (4,531 lb), and the curb weight of the Gran Coupé is 1,950 kg (4,299 lb).

The front of the car has a newly designed M kidney grille with an “M6” badge – a homage to the first generation of the M6. The lead exterior designer of the F12/F13/F06 6 Series was Nader Faghihzadeh.

M Performance Parts can be fitted to all M6 models. These include black kidney grilles, a sport exhaust system that reduces weight, a carbon fibre diffuser, a carbon fibre spoiler, a carbon fibre sport steering wheel and a carbon fibre gear selector.

=== Competition Package ===
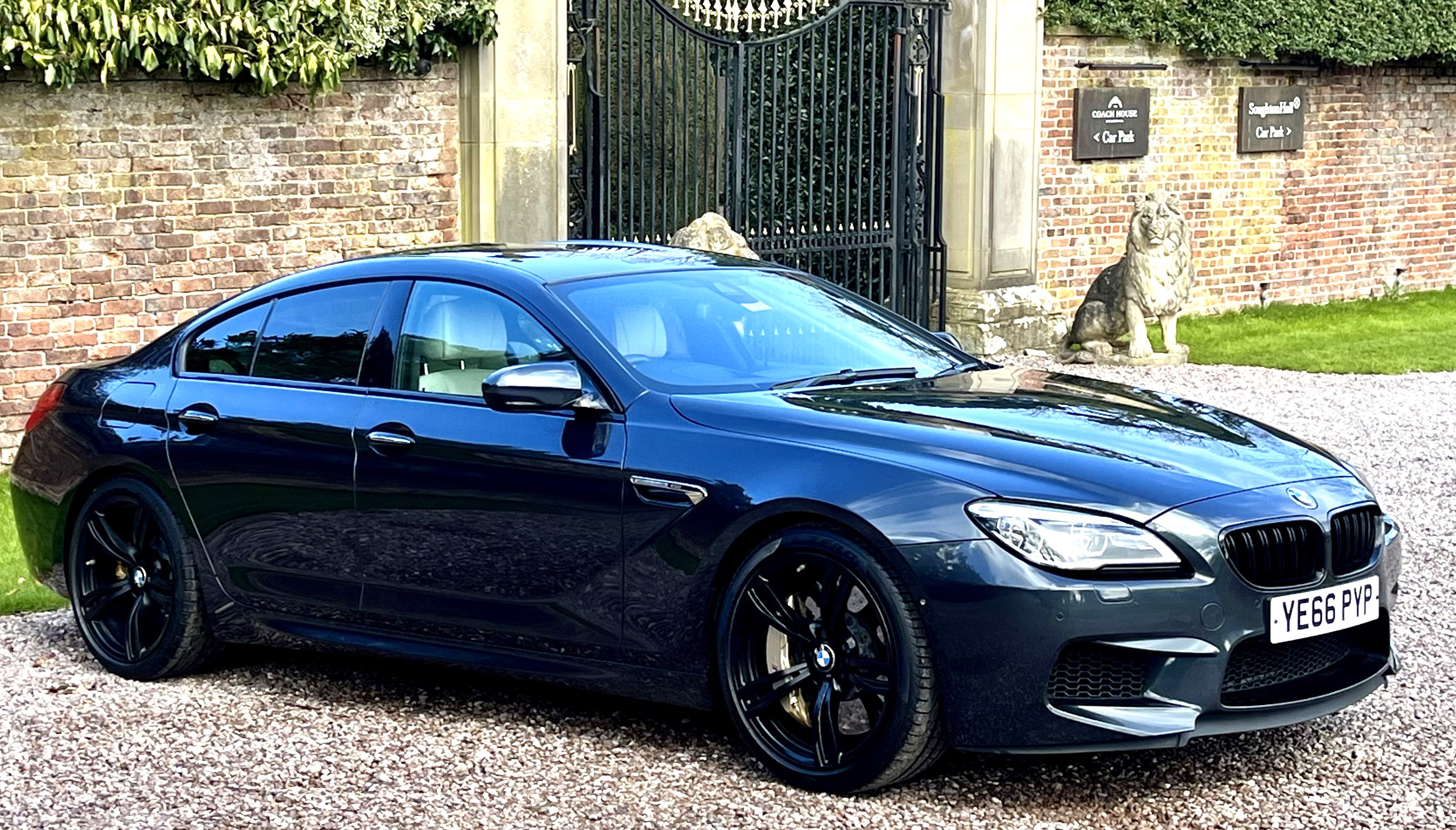
2016 M6 Competition Gran Coupe (F06), with gold calipers & ceramic discs

With the 2014 Competition Package, the M6 comes with a sportier exhaust system with black tips; stiffer springs, dampers, and anti-roll bars; more direct steering than the base M6; and an updated version of the M6’s twin-turbocharged V8 engine, now rated at 423 kW (567 hp) and 680 N⋅m (502 lb⋅ft) of torque. This results in a 0 to 100 km/h (62 mph) acceleration time of 3.9 seconds for the coupe and Gran Coupe versions. In 2016, the Competition Pack engine was upgraded to 441 kW (591 hp) and 700 N⋅m (516 lb⋅ft) of torque, resulting in a 0 to 100 km/h (62 mph) acceleration time of 3.8 seconds for the coupe and Gran Coupe versions.

== Motorsport ==
=== M6 GT3 ===
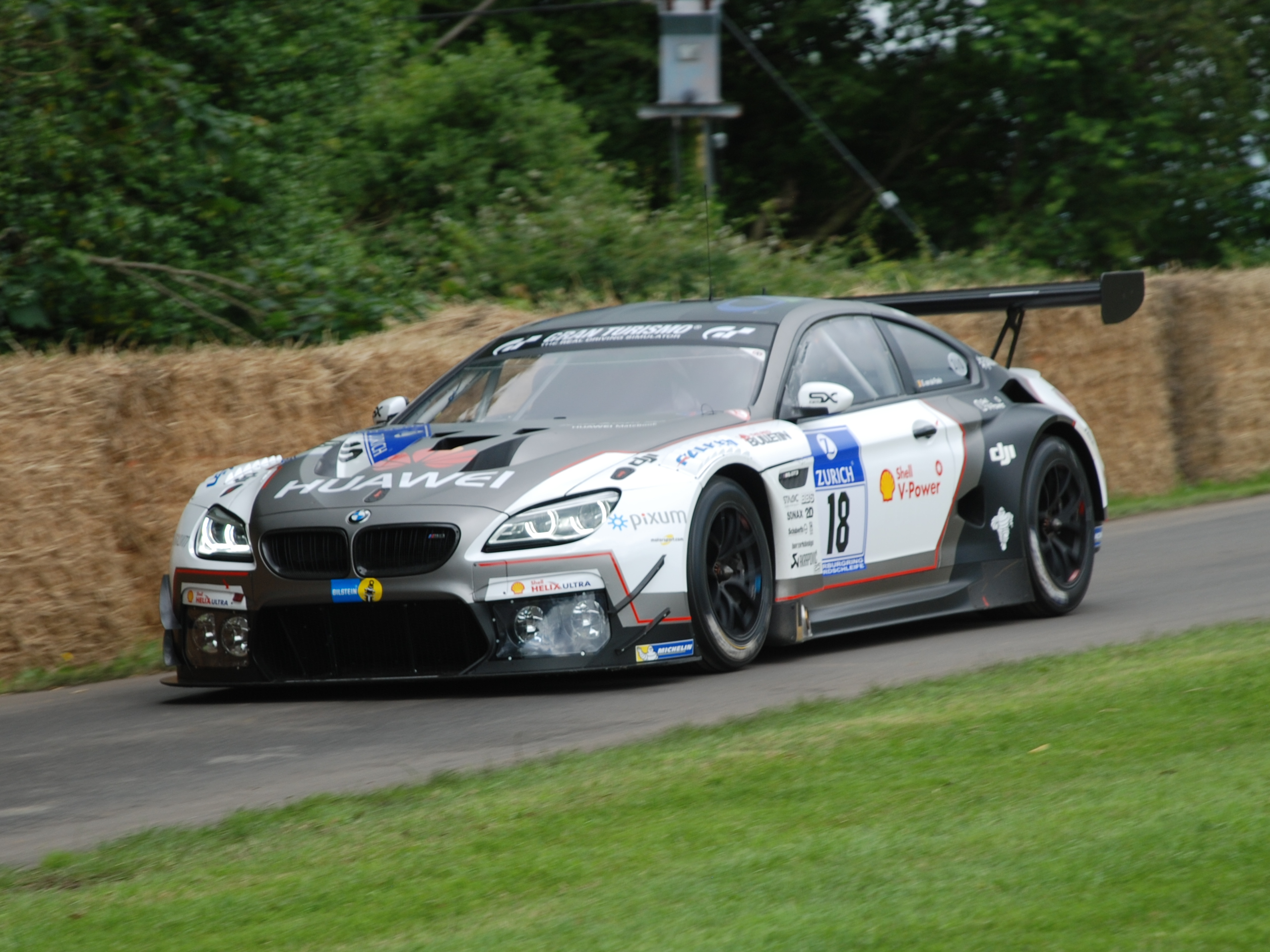
The BMW M6 GT3 at the 2016 Goodwood Festival of Speed.

Around the start of 2015, BMW Motorsport began developing a replacement for the successful BMW Z4 GT3 which already had been in action since 2010, where they selected the M6 as the base model. Throughout the year, the factory engineered the M6 to match FIA GT3 specifications. Emphasis was placed on safety with BMW Motorsport producing an "FIA-approved safety cell in accordance with the very latest safety standards". Unlike the Z4 GT3, which used an engine derived from the BMW M3, the engine of the M6 GT3 was virtually unchanged from that of the production model of the M6 (and the BMW M5). The engine only faced some modifications for use in motorsport. In May 2015, at Dingolfing, BMW works driver Jörg Müller drove the M6 GT3 on its first roll-out to contribute a milestone to its development, and later the M6 GT3 was revealed near the end of the year.

The M6 GT3 showed its success on its debut year in 2016 when Rowe Racing clinched overall victory at the 2016 24 Hours of Spa with BMW works drivers Philipp Eng, Maxime Martin, and Alexander Sims at the wheel. The car also saw success in championships around the world, with wins in the VLN, Italian GT Championship, and Super GT Championship.

=== M6 GTLM ===
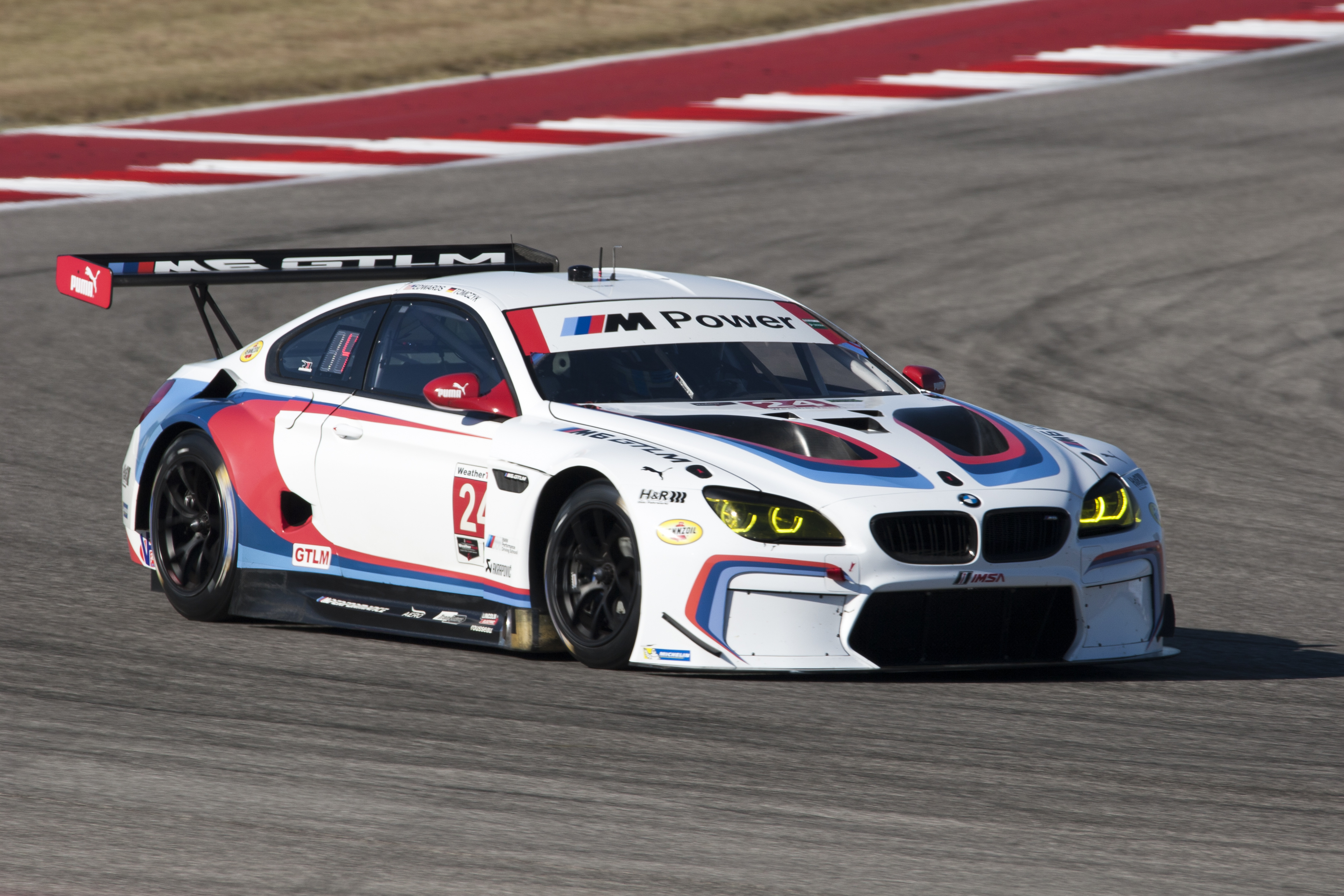
The BMW M6 GTLM at Circuit of the Americas.

The BMW M6 GTLM is the racing version of the M6 created to participate in the IMSA WeatherTech SportsCar Championship and intended to replace the BMW Z4 GTE. The cars are entered by BMW Team RLL, debuting in 2016, with no wins in its debut season. The car would earn four class wins during the 2017 season before being replaced by the BMW M8 GTE for 2018.

== See also ==
- BMW M5
- BMW 6 Series
- BMW M8
