= Angel Eyes =

Angel Eyes may refer to:

== Film and television ==
- Angel Eyes (film), a 2001 American romantic drama
- Angel Eyes, a character in the 1966 film The Good, the Bad and the Ugly
- Angel Eyes (TV series), a 2014 South Korean TV series
- "Angel Eyes" (Taggart), a television episode

== Music ==
=== Albums ===
- Angel Eyes (Dave Brubeck album), 1964
- Angel Eyes (Duke Pearson album), 1968
- Angel Eyes (Gene Ammons album), 1965
- Angel Eyes (Joe Bonner album), 1976
- Angel Eyes (Kiki Dee album), 1987
- Angel Eyes (Stanley Cowell album), 1994
- Angel Eyes (Willie Nelson album), 1984
- Angel Eyes: Ballads & Slow Jams, by Jimmy Smith, 1996
- Angel Eyes (EP) or the title song, by Riot, 1997
- Angel Eyes, by Tamara Walker, 2002

=== Songs ===
- "Angel Eyes" (1946 song), a jazz standard written by Earl Brent and Matt Dennis
- "Angel Eyes" (The Jeff Healey Band song), 1989; covered by Paulini, 2004
- "Angel Eyes" (Jerry Cantrell song), 2002
- "Angel Eyes" (Lime song), 1983
- "Angel Eyes" (Love and Theft song), 2011
- "Angel Eyes" (Raghav song), 2005
- "Angel Eyes" (Roxy Music song), 1979
- "Angel Eyes (Home and Away)", by Wet Wet Wet, 1987
- "Angeleyes", by ABBA, 1979
- "I'll Never Let You Go (Angel Eyes)", by Steelheart, 1990
- "Angel Eyes", by Ace of Base from The Bridge, 1995
- "Angel Eyes", by Axel Rudi Pell from Tales of the Crown, 2008
- "Angel Eyes", by Heartsdales, 2005
- "Angel Eyes", by Jim Brickman, 1994
- "Angel Eyes", by m.o.v.e from Grid, 2006
- "Angel Eyes", by New Years Day from Victim to Villain, 2013
- "Pretty Little Angel Eyes", by Curtis Lee, 1961

== Other ==
- Angel Eyes (novel), a 1981 novel by Loren D. Estleman
- Angel Eyes, a 1991 novel by Eric Van Lustbader
- Tōkidenshō Angel Eyes, 1990s all-female fighting arcade
- Halo headlights or angel eyes, a type of automotive front lighting
