= BMW 5 Series (E39) =

Fourth generation of BMW 5 Series

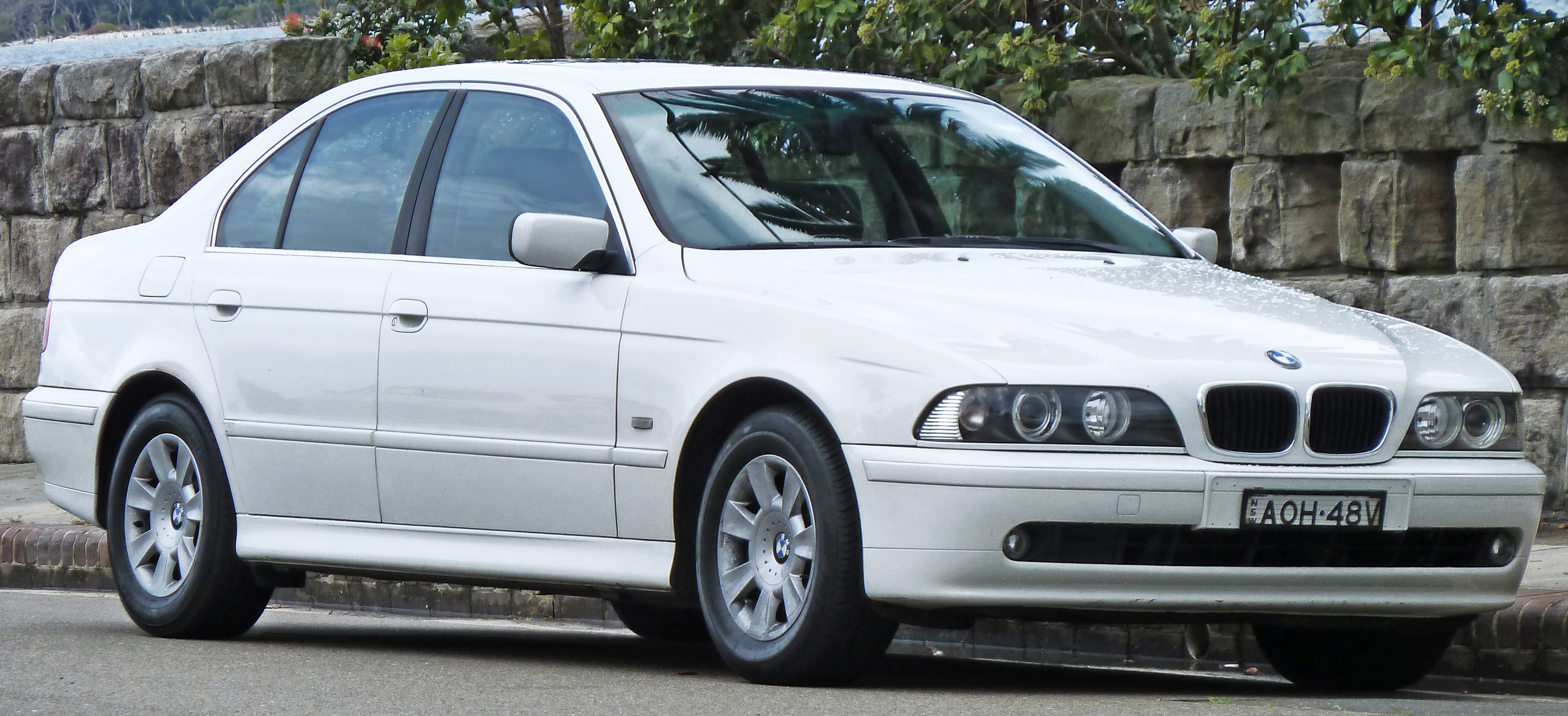
- Facelift BMW 525i sedan (Australia)

Overview
- Manufacturer: BMW
- Model code: E39
- Production: September 1995 – May 2004
- Assembly: Germany: Dingolfing; Egypt: 6th of October City (BAG); Indonesia: Jakarta (Gaya Motor); Russia: Kaliningrad (Avtotor)
- Designer: Joji Nagashima (1992)

Body and chassis
- Class: Executive car (E)
- Body style: 4-door saloon 5-door estate (Touring)
- Layout: FR layout
- Related: BMW M5 (E39); BMW 7 Series (E38)

Powertrain
- Engine: petrol: 2.0-2.8 L M52/M52TÜ I6; 2.2-3.0 L M54 I6; 3.5-4.4 L M62/M62TÜ V8; 4.9 L S62 V8; diesel: 2.0 L M47 turbo I4; 2.5 L M51 turbo I6; 2.5-2.9 L M57 turbo I6
- Transmission: 5-speed manual; 6-speed manual; 4-speed automatic; 5-speed automatic

Dimensions
- Wheelbase: 2,830 mm (111.4 in)
- Length: 4,775–4,805 mm (188.0–189.2 in)
- Width: 1,800 mm (70.9 in)
- Height: 1,435–1,445 mm (56.5–56.9 in)
- Curb weight: 1,500–1,845 kg (3,307–4,068 lb)

Chronology
- Predecessor: BMW 5 Series (E34)
- Successor: BMW 5 Series (E60)

The BMW E39 is the fourth generation of the BMW 5 Series range of executive cars, which was manufactured from 1995 to 2004. It was launched in the saloon body style, with the station wagon body style (marketed as "Touring") introduced in 1996. The E39 was replaced by the E60 5 Series in 2003, however E39 models remained in production until May 2004.

The proportion of chassis components using aluminium significantly increased for the E39, and it was the first 5 Series to use aluminium for all major components in the front suspension or any in the rear. It was also the first 5 Series where a four-cylinder diesel engine was available. Rack and pinion steering was used for four- and six-cylinder models, the first time that a 5 Series has used this steering system in significant volumes. Unlike its E34 predecessor and E60 successor, the E39 was not available with all-wheel drive.

The high performance E39 M5 saloon was introduced in 1998; it was the first M5 model to be powered by a V8 engine.

== Development and launch ==
Development for the E34's successor began in 1993, and ended in 1995. The final design by Joji Nagashima was selected in June 1992 and later frozen for production under new design chief Chris Bangle. With design selection in 1992, the series development phase began and took 39 months until start of production. The domestic German design patent was filed on 20 April 1994, with an E39 prototype.

Pre-production cars rolled off the pilot line from February 1995 starting with 523i and 528i models. This was followed by the 520i in March 1995, 525td/tds and 540i in April 1995 and 535i in October 1995. In May 1995 BMW published the first official photos of the E39. The E39 premiered in September 1995 at the Frankfurt Motor Show. Dealer demonstrator cars became available from September 1995 in continental Europe, commencing full scale production. In December 1995 sales of saloon models began on the European mainland. Production of wagon/estate models began in November 1996.

== Body styles ==
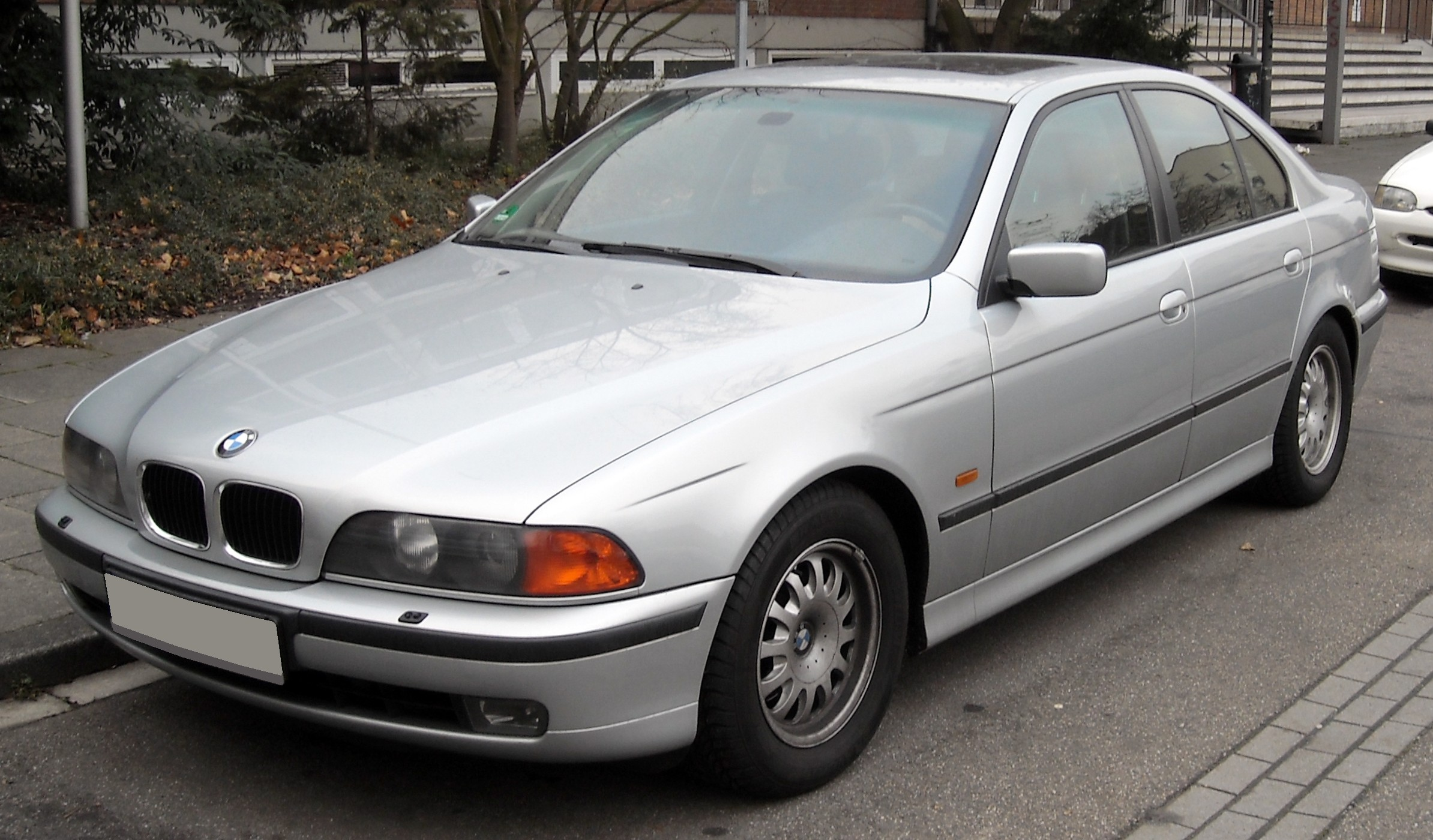
E39 saloon (pre-facelift; front)

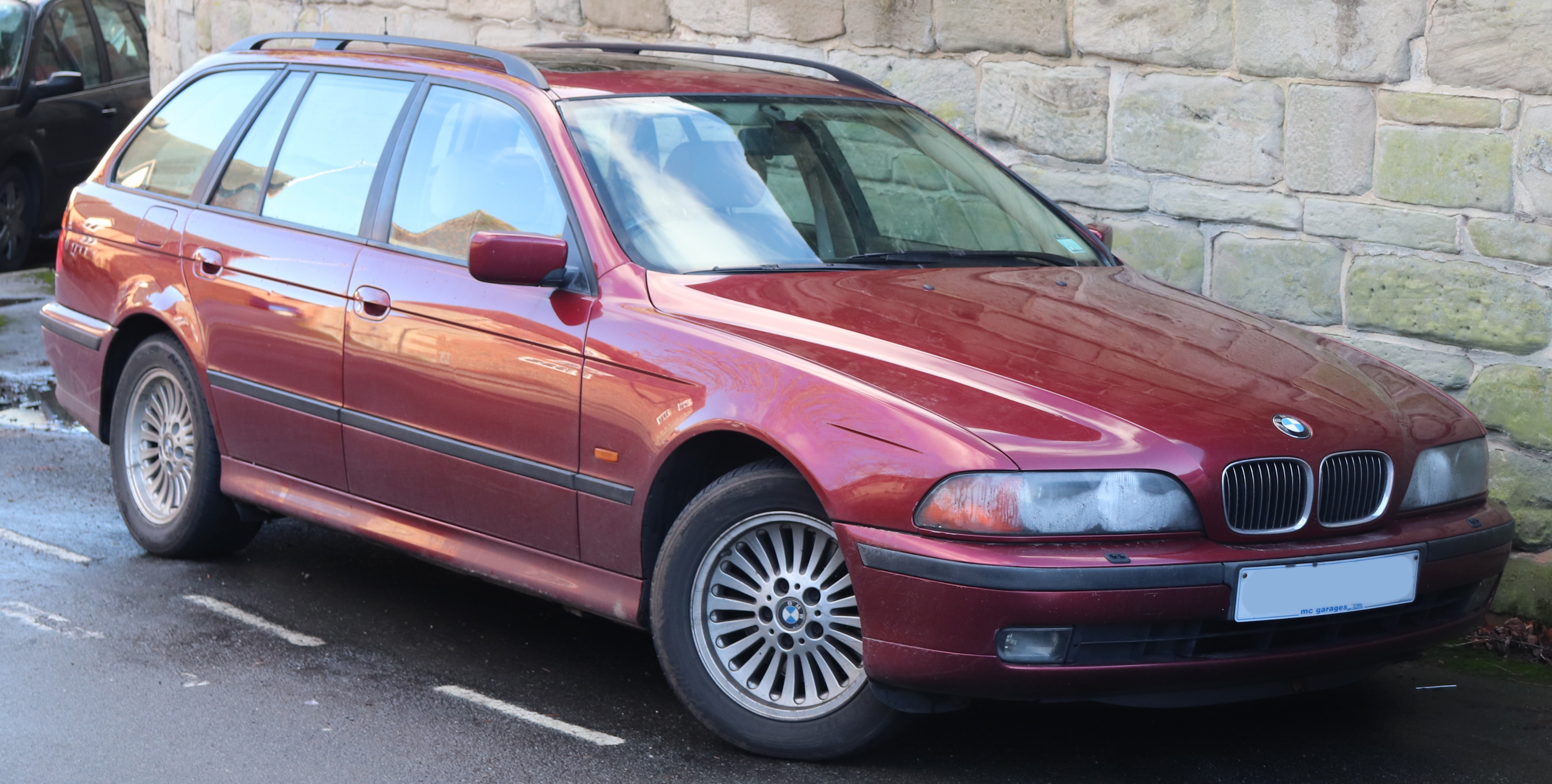
Pre-facelift 540i Touring (UK)

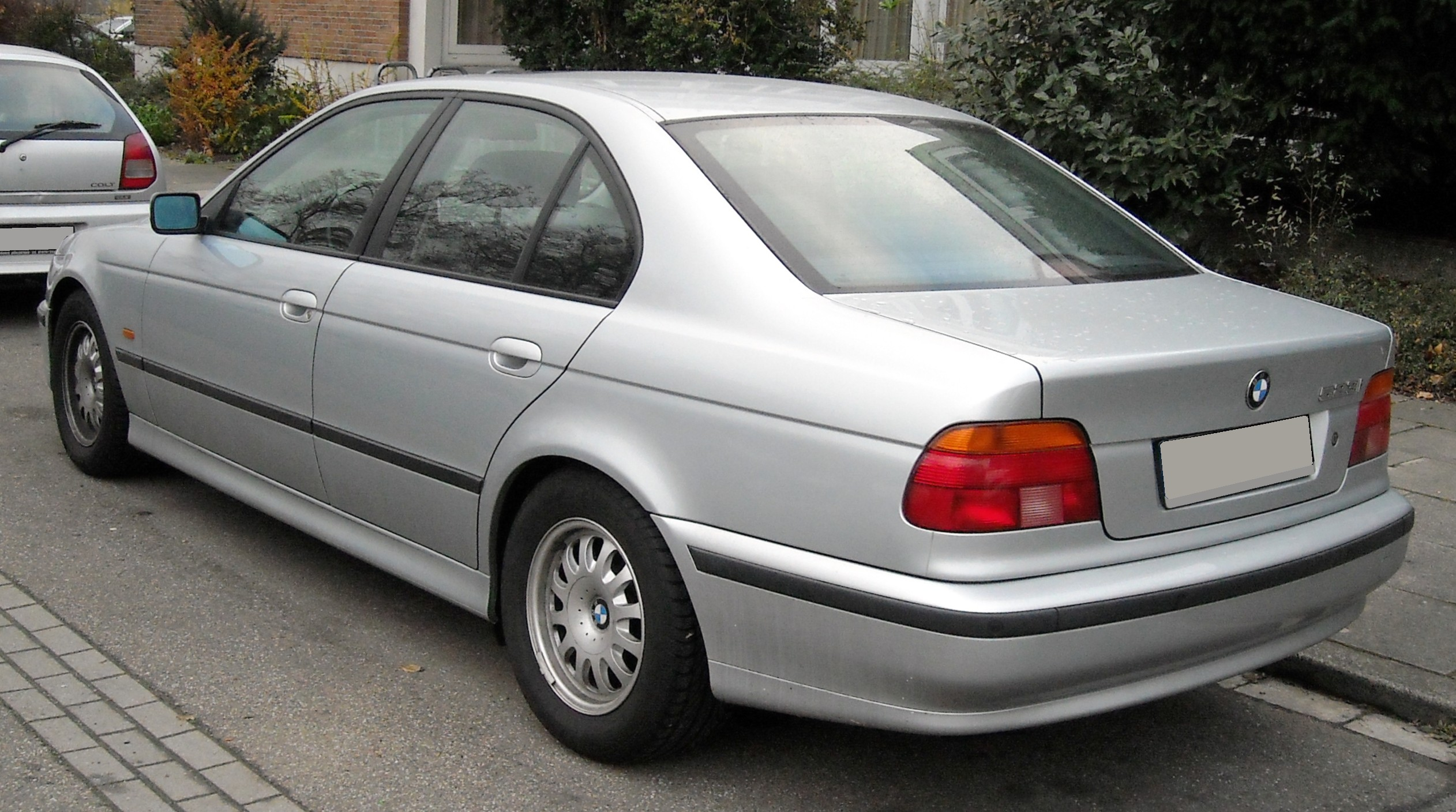
E39 saloon (pre-facelift; rear)

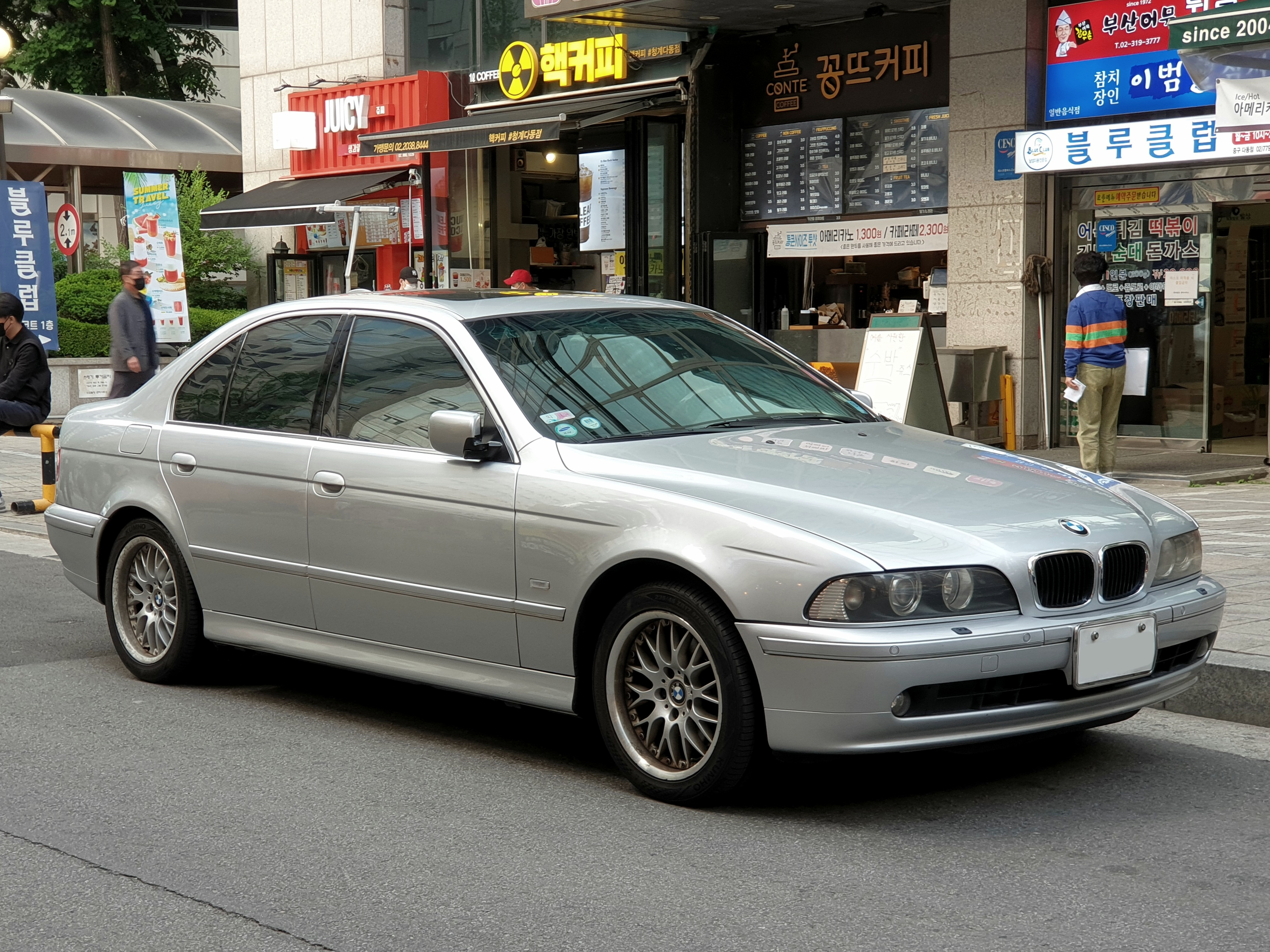
E39 saloon (facelift; South Korea)

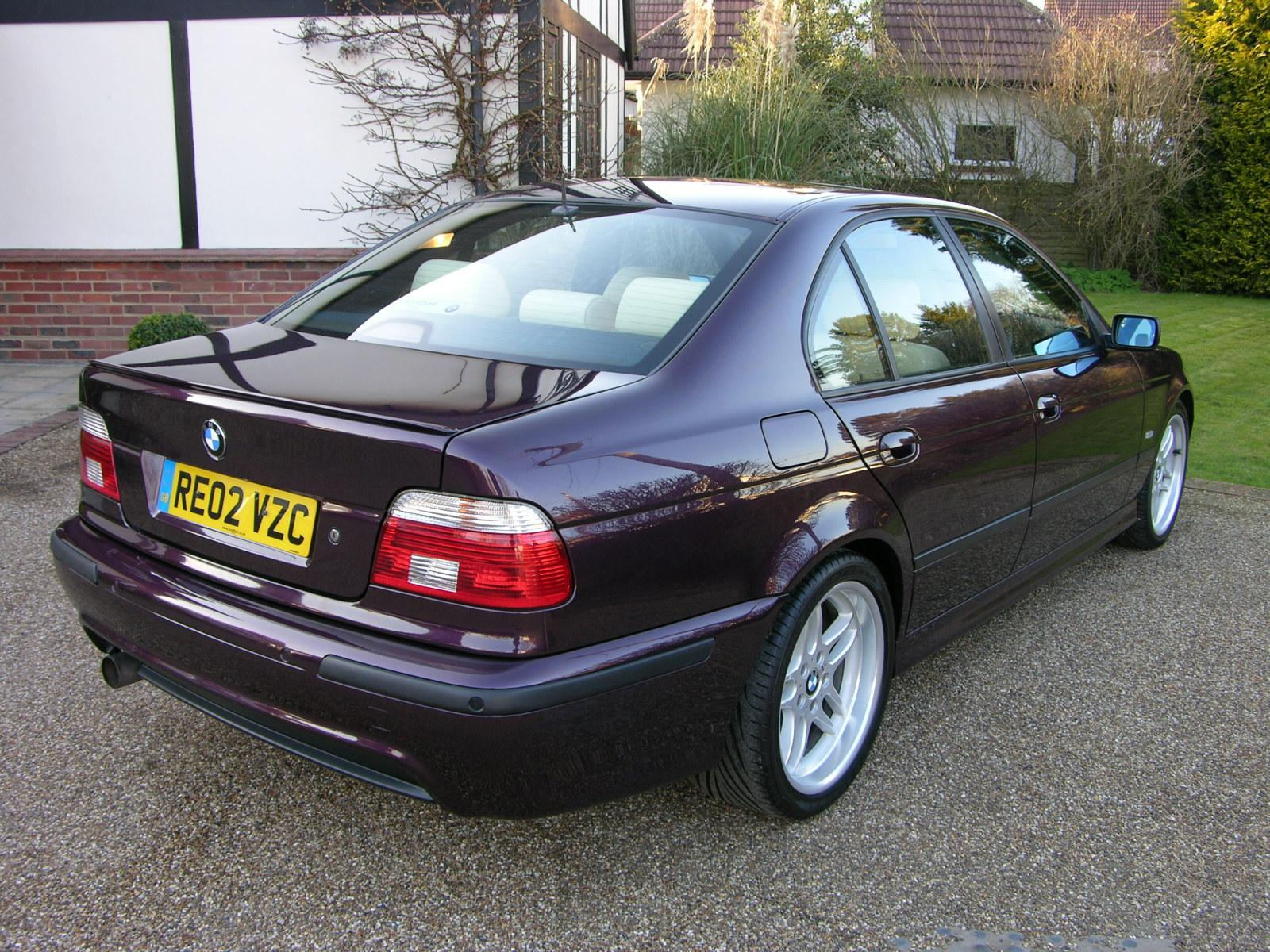
Facelift 530i Sport Individual (UK)

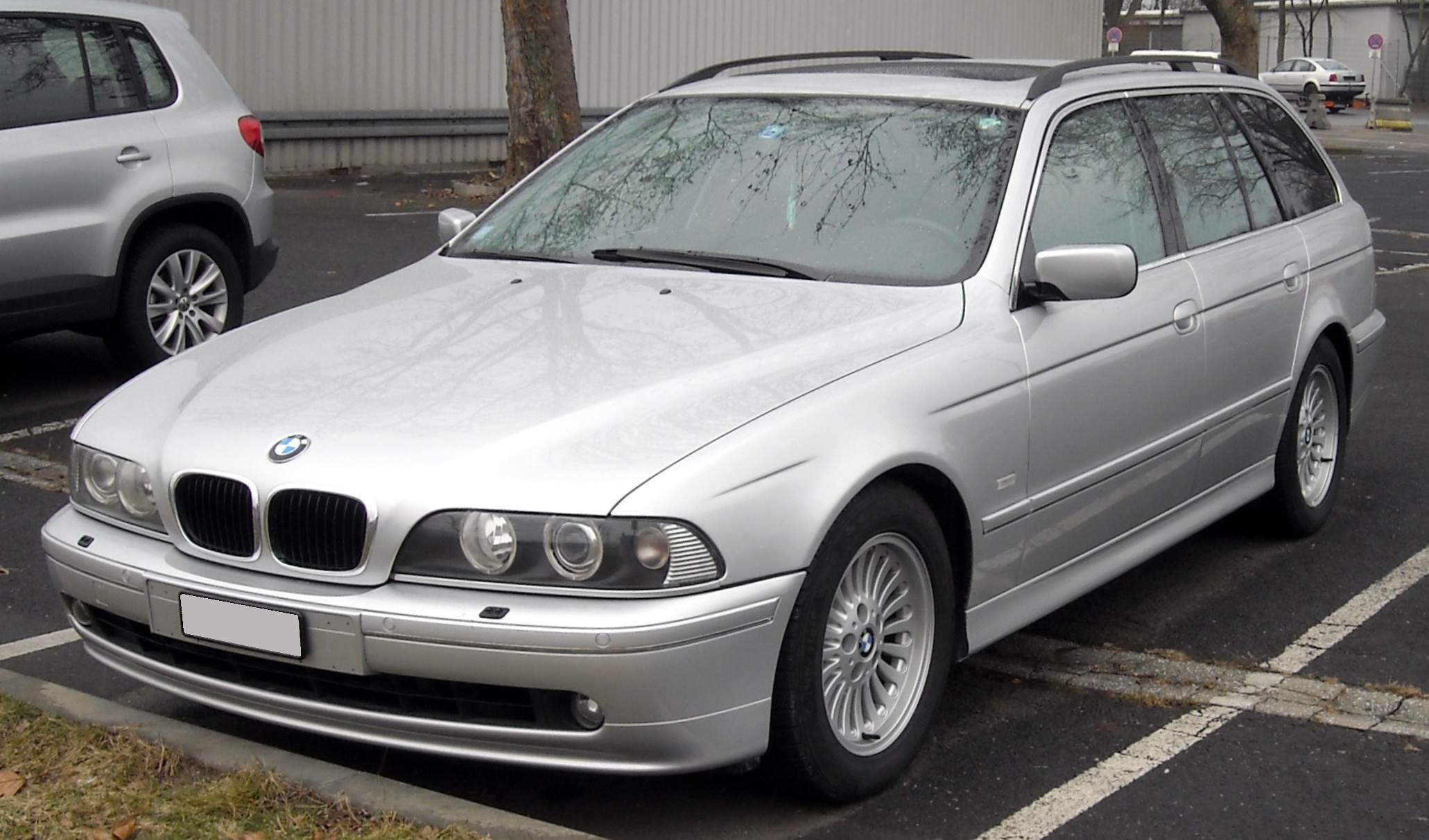
E39 Touring (facelift)

== Equipment ==
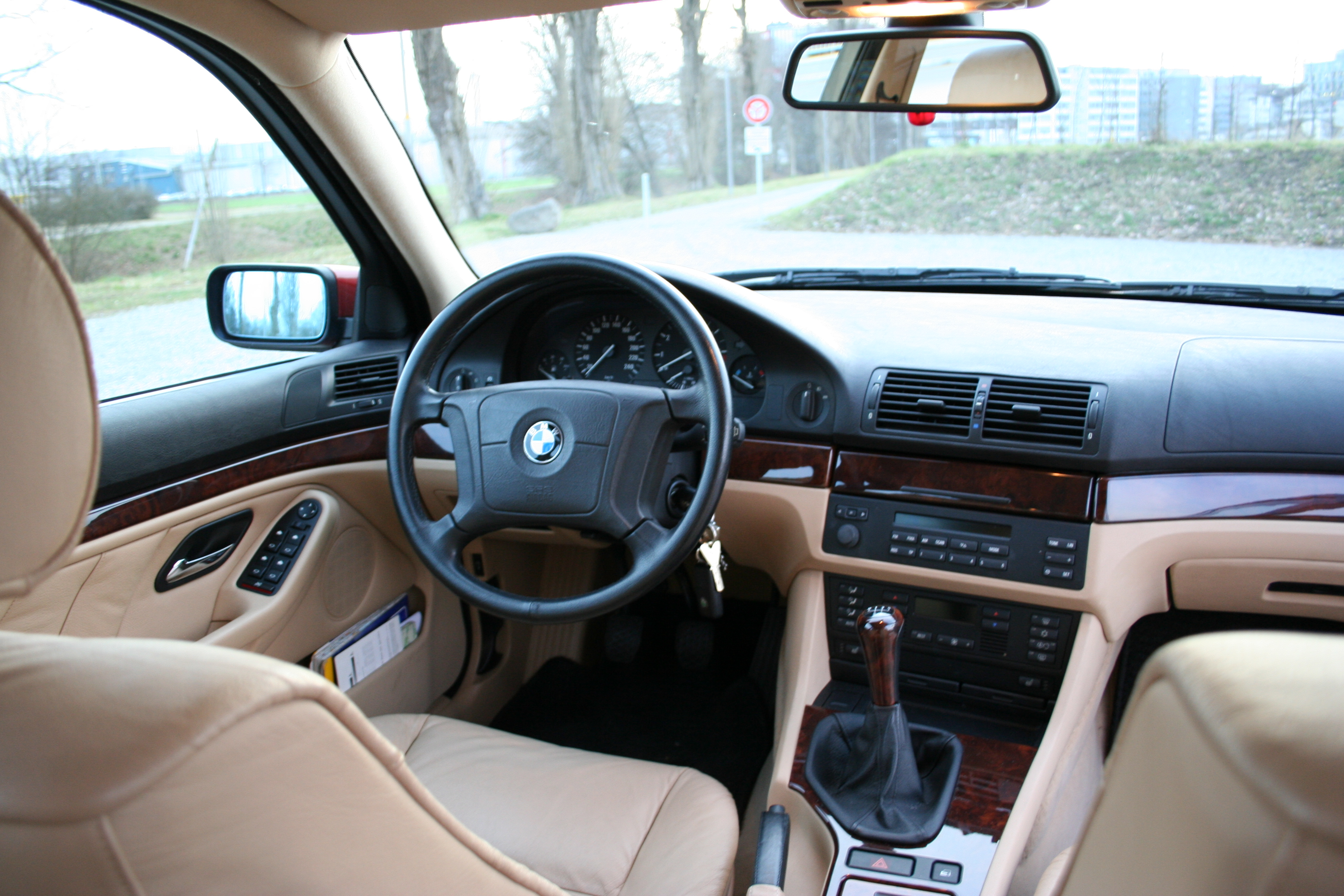
Interior: pre-facelift

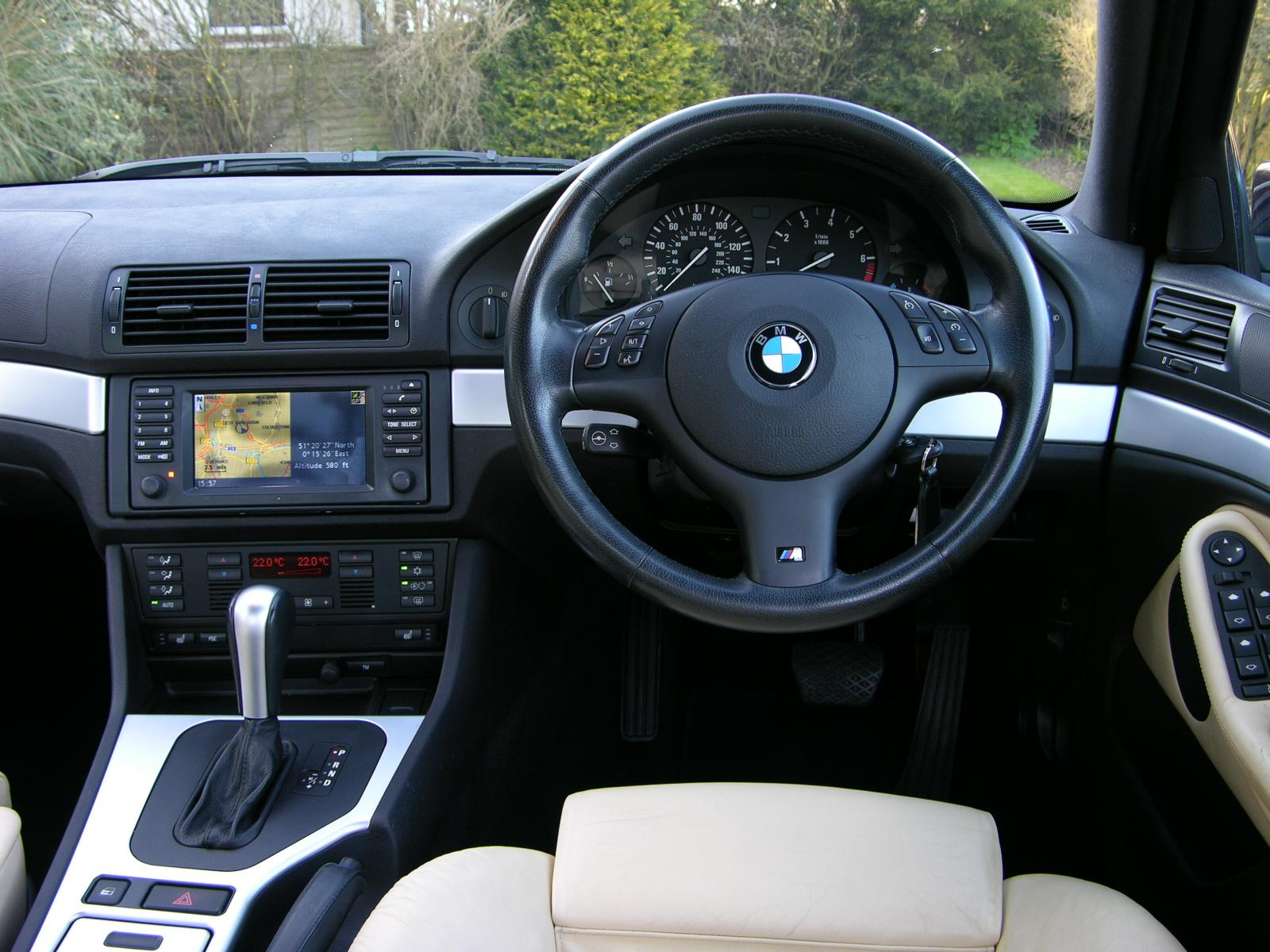
Interior: post-facelift (with M-sport steering wheel)

The E39 was one of the first vehicles (alongside the E38 7 Series) to have curtain airbags, which protect the occupants' heads in a side impact. Standard equipment on the launch models included dual front and side airbags, pretensioners and load limiters for the front seatbelts, anti-lock brakes, traction control, power steering, and air conditioning. Satellite navigation was also available, initially using maps on CD-ROMs, then moving to DVD maps in 2002. Some of the optional equipment included heated front seats and steering wheel, a voice entry system, a cordless car phone, and double glazed door side windows. Several models were available in Sports or Executive trim levels.

Special options available options on wagon models were either a roller blind or extending boot cover with patrician net for the rear boot area, roller sun visors for rear and side windows.

A "latent heat accumulator" was available as an option up until September 1999. The accumulator stores engine heat by converting a salt from solid to liquid form (phase transition). The insulated tank can store heat for several days. The next time the vehicle is started, this heat is automatically used to reduce exhaust emissions (by heating the engine up to operating temperature quicker), for cabin heating and window defrosting.

Separate to the latent heat accumulator is the Residual Heat function (activated by a button labelled "REST"), which allows the demister and cabin heater to use the heat of an engine that has recently been turned off (using an electric pump to push hot coolant through the heater core).

== Engines ==
=== Petrol engines ===
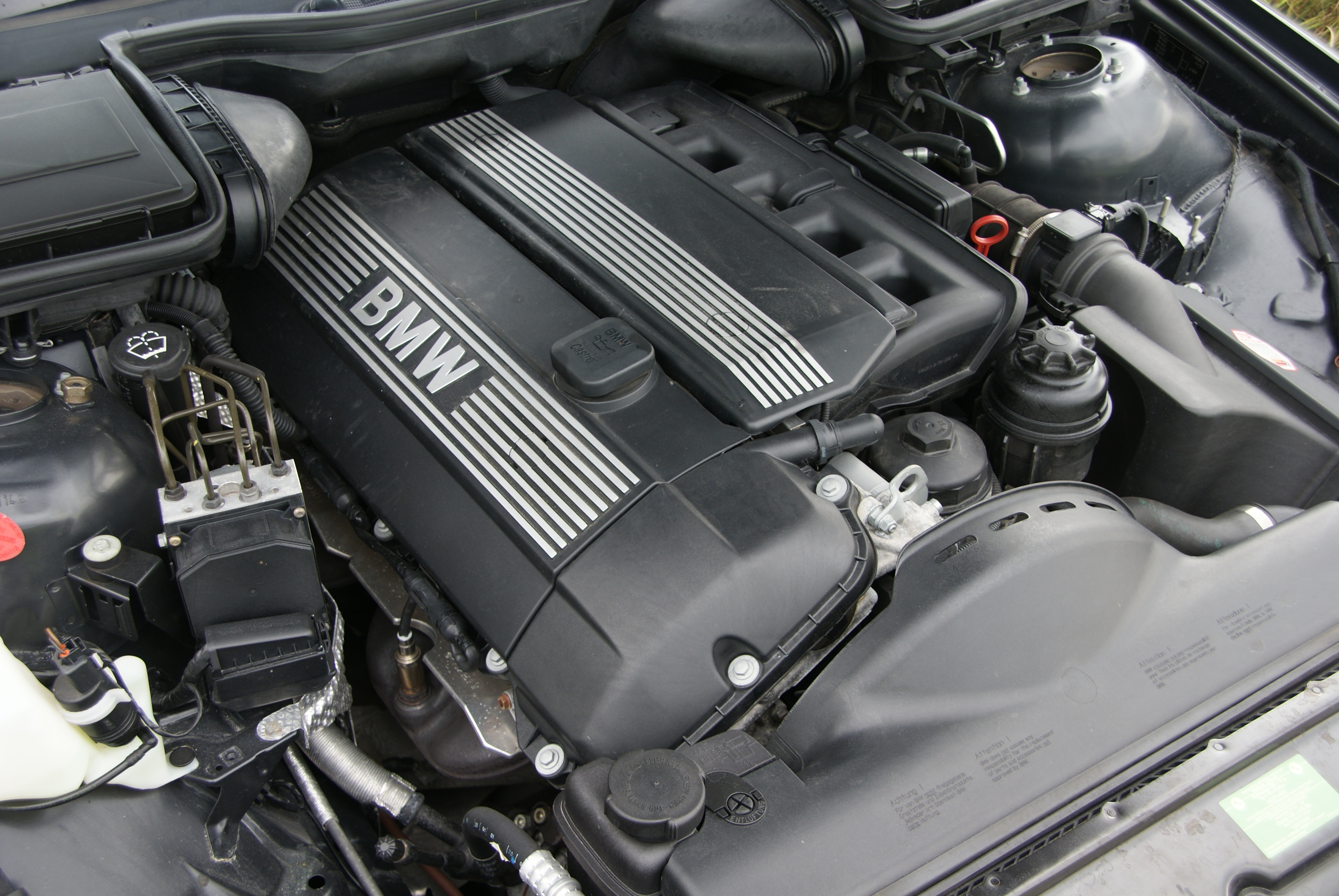
BMW M54 straight-6 engine

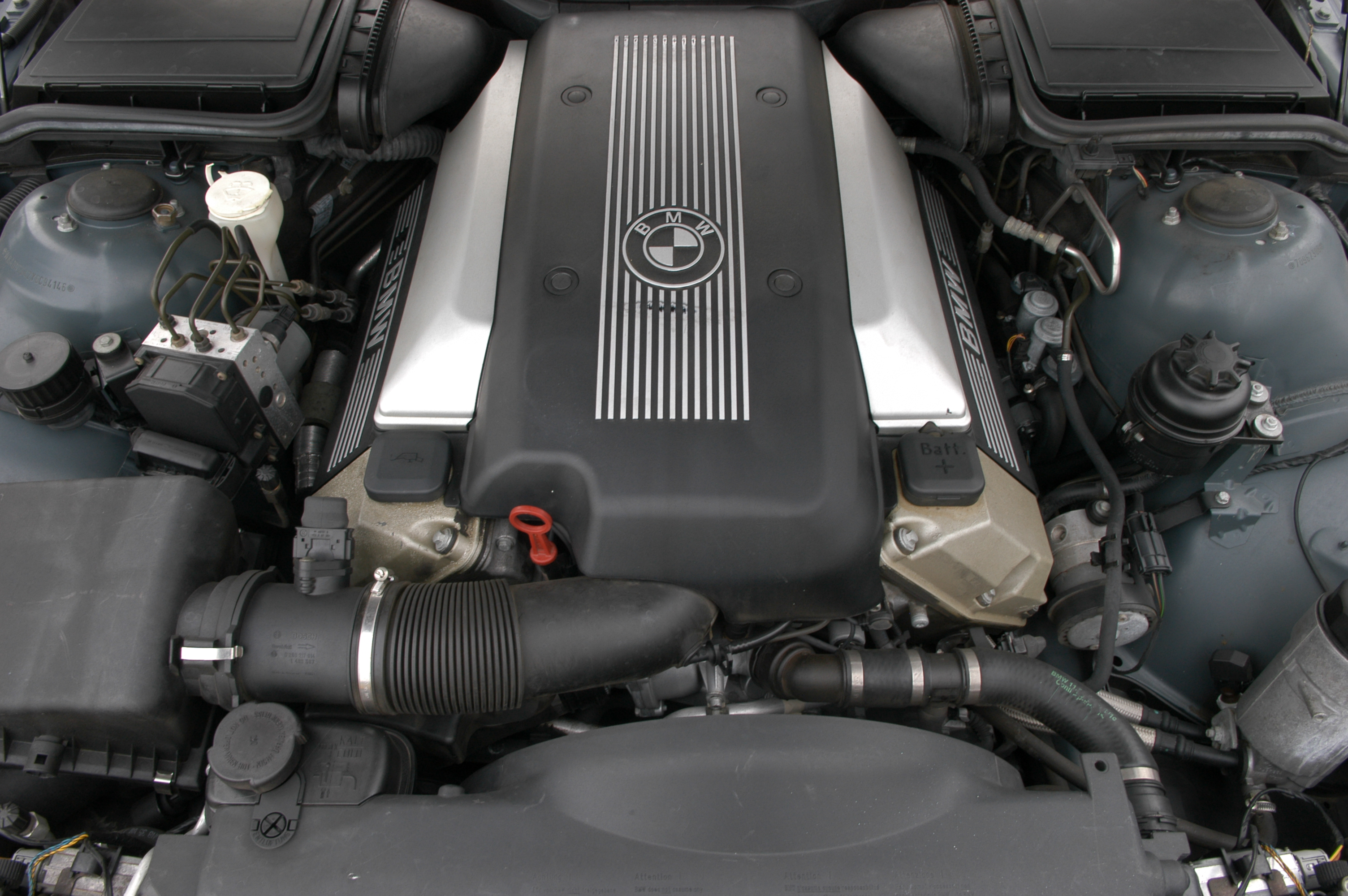
BMW M62 V8 engine

At launch, the petrol engines consisted of the BMW M52 straight-6 engines and the BMW M62 V8 engines. In late 1998, the "technical update" (TÜ) versions of these engines were introduced, introducing double VANOS to the M52 and single VANOS to the M62, primarily to increase torque at low rpm.

For the facelift of the model range in the year 2000, the M52 was replaced by the BMW M54 straight-6 engine and the version used in the 530i model topped the Ward's 10 Best Engines list in 2002 and 2003. The post-facelift V8 models (535i and 540i) continued to use the M62TÜ engine.

Specifications for European models are shown below.^{,}^{,}

Model	Years	Engine	Power	Torque
520i	1995–1998	1991 cc M52B20 straight-6	110 kW (150 PS; 148 hp) at 5,900 rpm	190 N⋅m (140 lb⋅ft) at 4,200 rpm
520i	1998–2000	1991 cc M52TÜB20 straight-6	110 kW (150 PS; 148 hp) at 5,900 rpm	190 N⋅m (140 lb⋅ft) at 3,500 rpm
520i	2000–2003	2171 cc M54B22 straight-6	125 kW (170 PS; 168 hp) at 6,100 rpm	210 N⋅m (155 lb⋅ft) at 3,500 rpm
523i	1995–1998	2494 cc M52B25 straight-6	125 kW (170 PS; 168 hp) at 5,500 rpm	245 N⋅m (181 lb⋅ft) at 3,950 rpm
523i	1998–2000	2494 cc M52TÜB25 straight-6	125 kW (170 PS; 168 hp) at 5,500 rpm	245 N⋅m (181 lb⋅ft) at 3,500 rpm
525i	2000–2003	2494 cc M54B25 straight-6	141 kW (192 PS; 189 hp) at 6,000 rpm	245 N⋅m (181 lb⋅ft) at 3,500 rpm
528i	1995–1998	2793 cc M52B28 straight-6	142 kW (193 PS; 190 hp) at 5,300 rpm	280 N⋅m (207 lb⋅ft) at 3,950 rpm
528i	1998–2001	2793 cc M52TÜB28 straight-6	142 kW (193 PS; 190 hp) at 5,500 rpm	280 N⋅m (207 lb⋅ft) at 3,500 rpm
530i	2000–2003	2979 cc M54B30 straight-6	170 kW (231 PS; 228 hp) at 5,900 rpm	300 N⋅m (221 lb⋅ft) at 3,500 rpm
535i	1996–1998	3498 cc M62B35 V8	173 kW (235 PS; 232 hp) at 5,700 rpm	320 N⋅m (236 lb⋅ft) at 3,300 rpm
535i	1998–2003	3498 cc M62TÜB35 V8	180 kW (245 PS; 241 hp) at 5,800 rpm	345 N⋅m (254 lb⋅ft) at 3,800 rpm
540i	1995–1998	4398 cc M62B44 V8	210 kW (286 PS; 282 hp) at 5,700 rpm	420 N⋅m (310 lb⋅ft) at 3,900 rpm
540i	1998–2003	4398 cc M62TÜB44 V8	210 kW (286 PS; 282 hp) at 5,400 rpm	440 N⋅m (325 lb⋅ft) at 3,600 rpm
M5	1998–2003	4941 cc S62B50 V8	294 kW (400 PS; 394 hp) at 6,600 rpm	500 N⋅m (369 lb⋅ft) at 3,800 rpm

=== Diesel engines ===
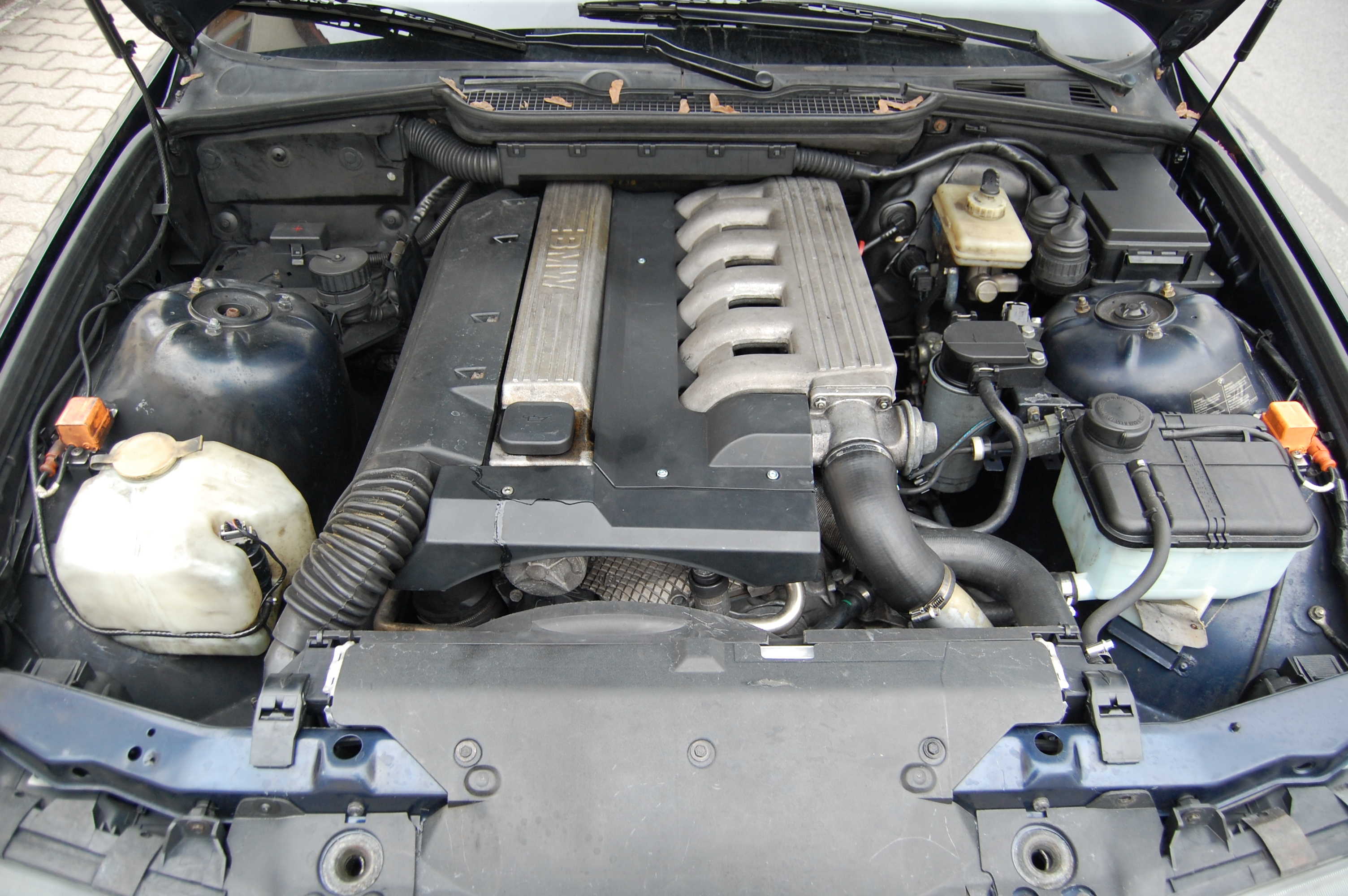
BMW M51 straight-6 engine (shown in an E36 3 Series)

The initial diesel models used the BMW M51, turbocharged straight-six engine carried over from its predecessor. In 1998, its successor the BMW M57 was introduced in the 530d model; however, the BMW M51 engine continued to be used for two more years in the 525td and 525tds models. In 1999, the M47 four-cylinder turbo-diesel was introduced in the 520d model; this is the only E39 model to use a four-cylinder engine.

Specifications for European models are shown below.^{,}^{,}

Model	Years	Engine- turbo	Power	Torque
520d	2000–2003	1951 cc M47D20 straight-4	100 kW (136 PS; 134 hp) at 4,000 rpm	280 N⋅m (207 lb⋅ft) at 1,750 rpm
525d	2000–2003	2497 cc M57D25 straight-6	120 kW (163 PS; 161 hp) at 4,000 rpm	350 N⋅m (258 lb⋅ft) at 2,000 rpm
525td	1996–2000	2497 cc M51D25TÜ UL straight-6	85 kW (116 PS; 114 hp) at 4,800 rpm	230 N⋅m (170 lb⋅ft) at 1,900 rpm
525tds	1996–2000	2497 cc M51D25TÜ OL straight-6	105 kW (143 PS; 141 hp) at 4,600 rpm	280 N⋅m (207 lb⋅ft) at 2,200 rpm
530d	1998–2000	2926 cc M57D30 straight-6	135 kW (184 PS; 181 hp) at 4,000 rpm	390 N⋅m (288 lb⋅ft) at 1,750 rpm
530d	2000–2003	2926 cc M57D30 straight-6	142 kW (193 PS; 190 hp) at 4,000 rpm	410 N⋅m (302 lb⋅ft) at 1,750 rpm

== Drivetrain ==
=== Manual transmissions ===
Six-cylinder petrol models and 535i were fitted with either the 5-speed Getrag 250G or ZF 320Z (S5-32) transmission, depending on the year and model. Diesel models with the M51 engine were fitted with the 5-speed ZF 260Z transmission, while the M57 diesel models were fitted with the 5-speed ZF 390 (S5-39DZ) transmission. 540i and M5 were fitted with the 6-speed Getrag 420G transmission.

=== Automatic transmissions ===
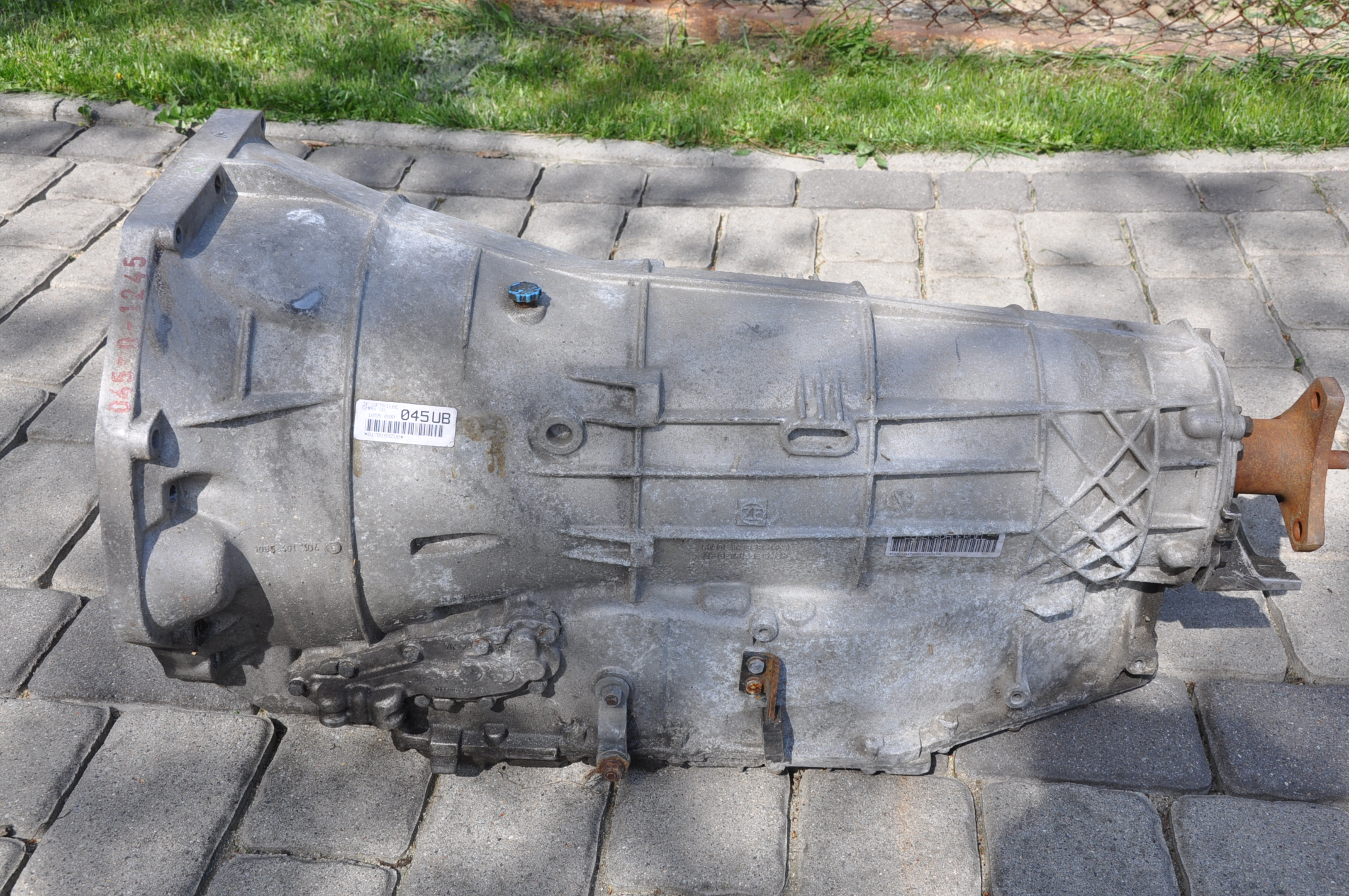
ZF 5HP-30 transmission

Some pre-facelift six-cylinder petrol models were fitted with the 4-speed GM 4L30-E (A4S270R) transmission. Six-cylinder pre-facelift cars built for the Japanese market were fitted with the Jatco 5R01 5 speed automatic transmission. All other six-cylinder models were fitted with 5-speed transmissions, either the GM 5L40-E (A5S360R), GM 5L40-E (A5S390R), or ZF 5HP19 (A5S325Z) transmission, depending on the year and model. V8 petrol models were fitted with either the 5-speed ZF 5HP24 (A5S440Z) or the 5-speed ZF 5HP30 (A5S560Z).

=== Differential ratios ===
The following differential ratios were used by the E39:

- 2.35: 530d, 525d manual
- 2.56: 520d
- 2.64: 525td/tds manual
- 2.81: 540i manual, 530d automatic
- 2.93: 528i/530i manual, 535i
- 3.07: 528iT/530iT manual, 525d automatic
- 3.15: 525i/525tds automatic, 523i automatic, 540i automatic
- 3.15 (LSD): M5
- 3.23: 525iT manual, 523iT
- 3.38/3.46: 525i Auto
- 3.46: 528i/530i (5-speed) automatic
- 4.10: 528i (4-speed) automatic

== Steering ==
Unusually, two different steering systems were used for the E39, depending on the engine. Models with four-cylinder and six-cylinder models use rack and pinion steering, the first time this system has been used in a 5 Series (except for the E34 525iX model). This system steers from the front of the axle. Models with V8 engines use recirculating ball steering, as per the previous generations of 5 Series.

== Chassis and body ==
Compared with its E34 predecessor, the E39's wheelbase grew by 68 mm (2.7 in) and overall length by 55 mm (2.2 in). Torsional rigidity was increased over the E34 by 40 percent, which reduces body flex and allows the suspension to operate more accurately, also improving ride quality. Structural dynamics were also an objective of the body design, so the body's frequencies for torsional twisting and bending are in separate ranges and above the natural frequency of the body. These frequencies are out of the range of engine and driveline vibrations, to avoid vibrations being amplified.

Due to a stiffer body shell, the weight of the chassis increased by 10 kg (22 lb), which is offset by the reduced weight of some aluminium suspension components. The wagon version was 85 mm (3.3 in) longer than the previous generation (E34) and weighed approximately 40 kg (88 lb) more.

== Suspension ==
The E39 was the first 5 Series to use aluminium for most components in the front suspension. The proportion of chassis components using aluminium significantly increased for the E39.

The front suspension consists of a double-jointed version of the MacPherson strut, with six-cylinder cars using an aluminium front subframe. Aluminium is used for the steering knuckles, outer strut tube and the spring pads, resulting in a weight saving of 21 kg (46 lb). V8 models also use aluminium in the steering box and several suspension links, to compensate for the heavier steel subframe.

The rear suspension consists of a four link design (called "Z-link"), which is similar to the system used by the E38 7 Series. The design minimises unintentional toe angle changes, which increases the stability of the handling.

=== Wagon self-levelling suspension ===
The Touring model was the first BMW model to use air suspension (self-levelling suspension was first used by BMW for the E23 7 Series with a closed-loop nitrogen system that operated in parallel with the steel springs). This "self leveling" system controls the ride height of the rear of the vehicle and is designed to keep the centre of the wheel a specified distance from the lip of the fender as the weight of the load in the boot area varies.

Instead of using a traditional coil springs, the system uses pneumatic springs paired with air reservoirs that are pressurised by an air compressor. The system is controlled by two Hall-effect sensors at the rear of the vehicle. These sensors tell the EHC (electric height control) if the rear ride height needs to be adjusted and adjust headlight height for vehicles equipped with xenon headlights. When a door or the rear hatch is opened and then closed, the control module will constantly monitor the input signals from the Hall sensors and will activate a correction if the ride height has change greater than 10 mm. During normal operation the system stays online but does not adjust to conditions such as potholes.

== M5 model ==
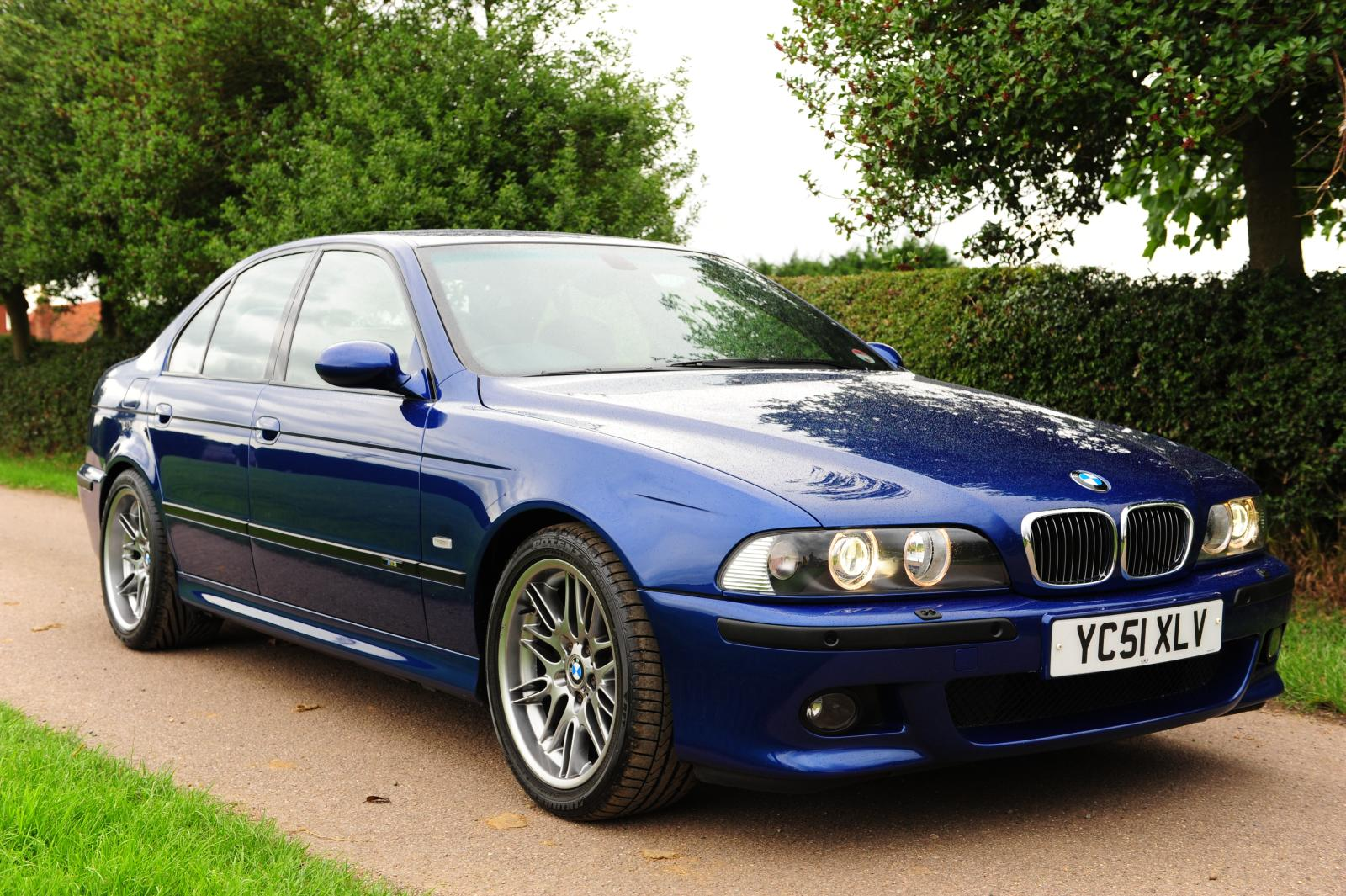
M5 front (post-facelift)

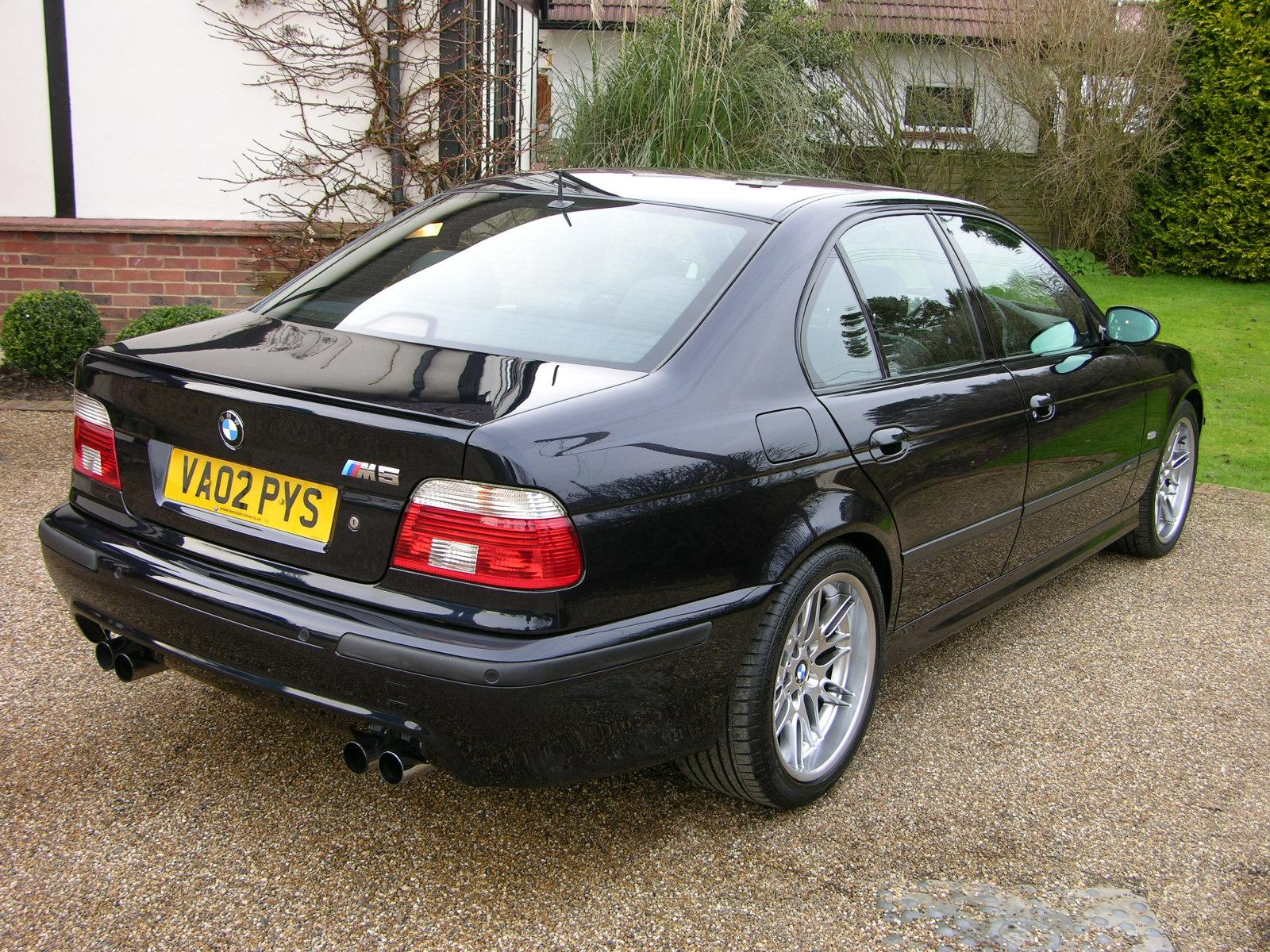
M5 rear (post-facelift)

The M5 model of the E39 was introduced in 1998 at the Geneva Motor Show and was produced from 1998 to 2003. It was powered by the S62 V8 engine producing 394 horsepower. All E39 M5 cars that were made were sold in the saloon body style with a 6-speed manual transmission. A single M5 Touring model was made, but was never sold or put into production.

== Alpina E39 models ==
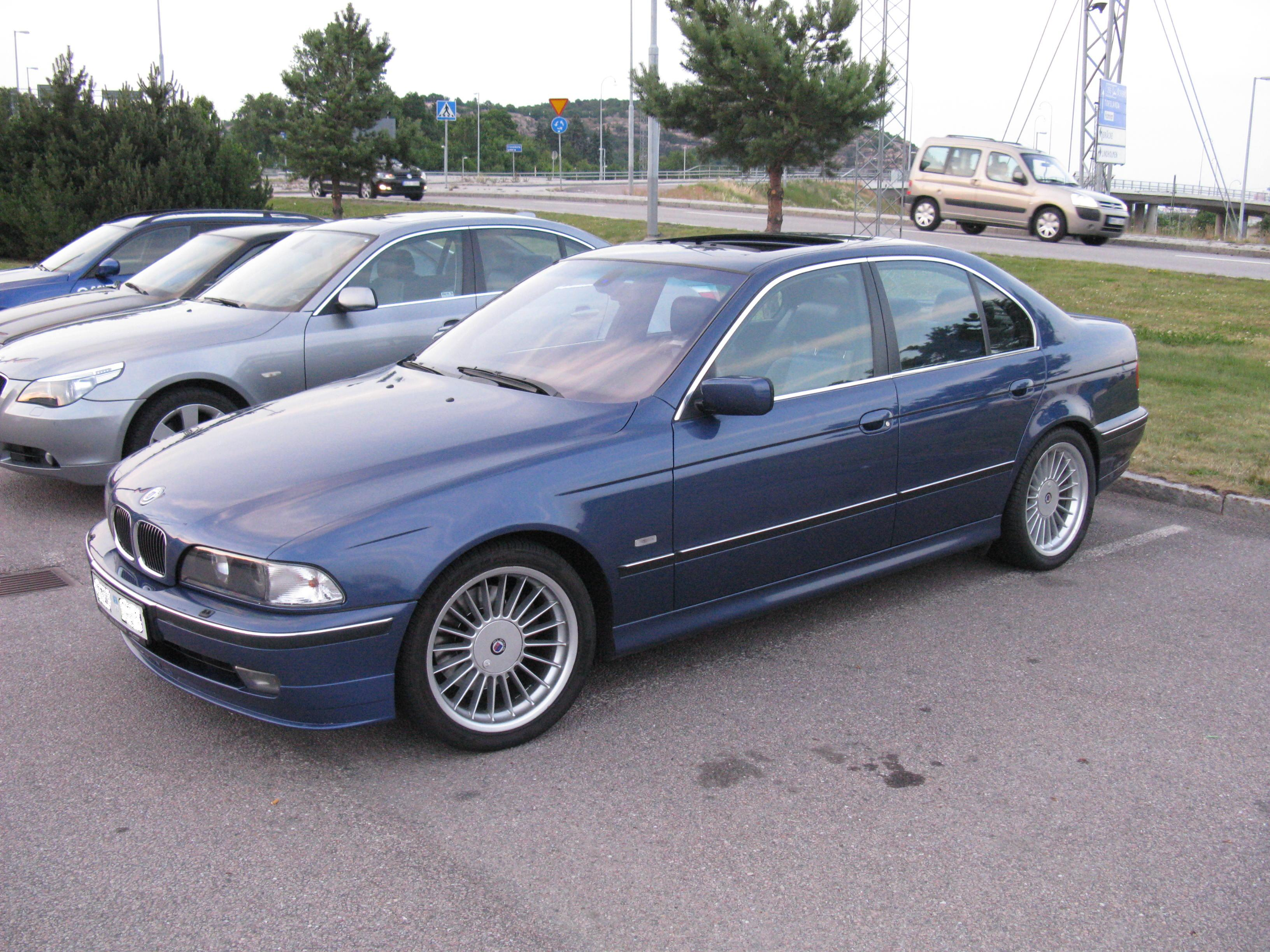
Alpina B10 V8

The Alpina B10 3.2, 3.3, V8 and V8S petrol-engined models were built in saloons and wagon body styles based on the E39 from January 1997 to May 2004.

The Alpina B10 3.2 was based on an E39 528i saloon produced by Alpina from August 1997 to December 1998. It was first shown to the public at the IAA Motor show in 1997. The engine is a 6 cylinder petrol producing 260 bhp and 330 nm of torque to the rear driving wheels. 0–60 miles per hour in 6.7 seconds and a top speed of 160 miles per hour. The B10 3.2 was only available to buy in a 5 speed manual ZF gearbox and only 260 were ever made.

The Alpina B10 3.3 was based on an E39 528i Touring produced by Alpina from February 1999 to October 2003. It was first shown to the public at the Geneva Motor show in 1999. The engine is a 6 cylinder petrol producing 280 bhp and 335 nm of torque to the rear driving wheels. 0–60 miles per hour in 6.3 seconds and a top speed of 162 miles per hour. The B10 3.3 was available to buy in a 5 speed manual ZF gearbox or a switchtronic gearbox and only 240 were ever made.

The Alpina B10 V8 pre-facelift was based on an E39 540i saloon produced by Alpina from January 1997 to October 1998. The engine is an 8 cylinder petrol producing 340 bhp and 470 nm of torque to the rear driving wheels. 0–60 miles per hour in 5.9 seconds and a top speed of 180 miles per hour. The steering wheel was hand stitched by a professional working for Alpina. The B10 V8 pre-facelift was available to buy in a 5 speed manual ZF gearbox or an automatic gearbox and with it being one of Alpina's most successful cars, roughly 1,300 were sold worldwide also including the post-facelift models, the Touring models and the B10 V8 S models.

The Alpina B10 V8 post-facelift was based on an E39 540i saloon produced by Alpina from September 2000 to February 2002. The engine is an 8 cylinder petrol producing 347 bhp and 480 nm of torque to the rear driving wheels. 0–60 miles per hour in 5.6 seconds and a top speed of 173 miles per hour. The B10 V8 post-facelift was available to buy in a 5 speed manual ZF gearbox or an automatic gearbox.

The Alpina B10 V8 Touring was based on an E39 540i Touring produced by Alpina from October 1998 to July 2000. The engine is an 8 cylinder petrol producing 347 bhp and 480 nm of torque to the rear driving wheels. 0–60 miles per hour in 6.2 seconds and a top speed of 173 miles per hour. The B10 V8 Touring was available to buy in a 5 speed manual ZF gearbox or an automatic gearbox.

The Alpina B10 V8 S was based on an E39 540i saloon produced by Alpina from January 2002 to May 2004. The engine is an 8 cylinder petrol producing 375 bhp and 510 nm of torque to the rear driving wheels. 0–60 miles per hour in 5.4 seconds and a top speed of 176 miles per hour. The B10 V8 S was available to buy in a 5 speed automatic.

The Alpina D10 Biturbo was the first diesel car produced by Alpina and was based on an E39 530d. The D10 was in production from April 2000 to October 2003. It was first shown to the public in 1999 at the Geneva Motor show The engine was a 6 cylinder diesel producing 500 nm of torque to the rear driving wheels. 0–60 miles per hour in 7.2 seconds and a top speed of 157 miles per hour. The D10 Biturbo was available to buy in a Getrag 6 speed manual or a ZF 5 speed automatic and only 94 were ever made.

The Alpina D10 was the first diesel model produced by Alpina and was introduced in February 2000. The engine, a 3.0 litre twin-turbocharged unit rated at 180 kW (241 hp) and 500 N⋅m (369 lb⋅ft) of torque, was based on the engine of the 530d model.

== Special protection line model ==
The 540i Protection light-armored vehicle was launched in Europe in September 1997 and in North America from January 1998. These models included aramid fibre armor, bullet-resistant glass that is coated with polycarbonate to reduce spall. The 540i Protection is rated to withstand the impact of handgun fire up to and including .44 Magnum, the glass is also protected from attack with blunt objects such as baseball bats and bricks. The additional security measures brought an additional weight of 130 kg (287 lb) compared to the normal 540i saloon. on request, an intercom system was available and from January 1998 run-flat wheels were available.

== Model year changes ==
Most changes occur in September each year, when the changes for the following model year go into production, as is typical BMW practice. Therefore, the changes for 1996 represent the 1997 model year, for example.

=== 1996 ===
- Station wagon (estate, marketed as "Touring") body style introduced.
- 525td model introduced.

=== 1997 ===
- On-board computer upgraded.
- Cornering Brake Control introduced.
- Rear side airbags introduced.

=== 1998 ===
- M5 model introduced. Lower-body rear side airbags were standard on the M5, remaining optional for other models.
- M52 straight-six engines updated to M52TÜ.
- M62 V8 engines updated to M62TU.
- 530d model introduced, using the new M57 straight-six turbo-diesel engine.
- Xenon headlights introduced.
- Parking sensors ("Park Distance Control") introduced.
- Self-levelling rear suspension introduced for Estate models.
- Stability control upgraded (from ASC+T to DSC).
- Self-Adjusting Clutch (SAC) introduced on the straight-six petrol engines.
- Air conditioning, electric rear windows and on board computer added to standard equipment
- Satellite navigation upgraded from MKI (or Mark I) to MKII. Like the MKI, the MKII uses a 4:3 screen and stores the maps on a CD.

=== 1999 ===
- Rain-sensing windshield wiping introduced (June 1999).
- Front seat airbags upgraded to dual stage.
- 520d model (using M47 inline-four engine) introduced, replaces the 525td model (M51 engine).
- 525d model (using M57 engine) replaces the 525tds model (M51 engine).

=== 2000 facelift ===
The E39 facelift (also known as LCI) models began production in September 2000 (for the 2001 model year).

- 520i, 525i and 530i models (using M54 engines) replace the 520i, 523i and 528i model (M52TU engines).
- 530d model receives power increase.
- Kidney grilles on all models are changed to those of the M5.
- Revised external door handles - now in plastic rather than metal.
- Revised "angel eye" headlights.
- Revised tail lights with LED running lights.
- Navigation screen updated from 4:3 to larger 16:9 widescreen.
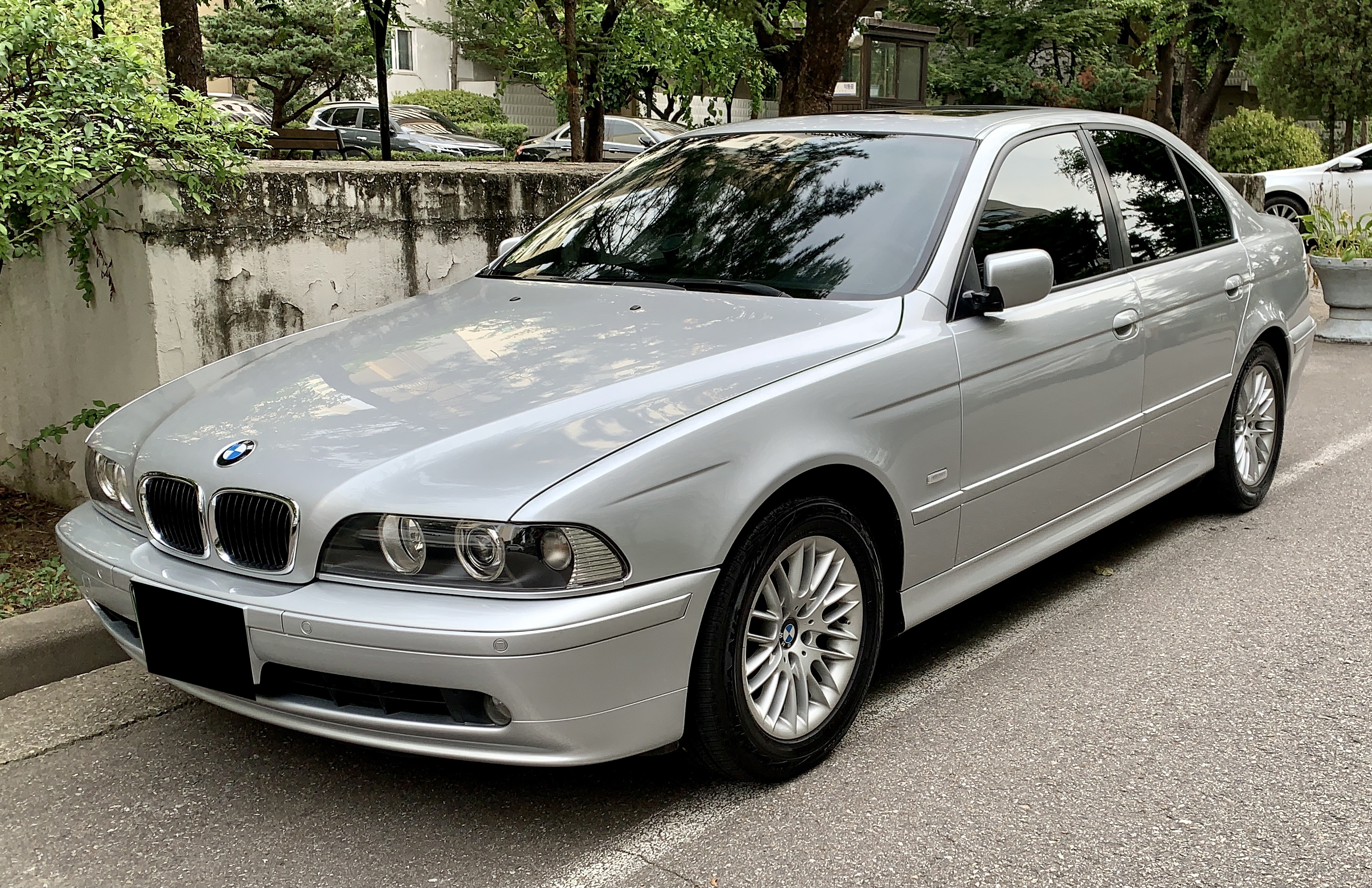
E39 saloon (facelift; front)

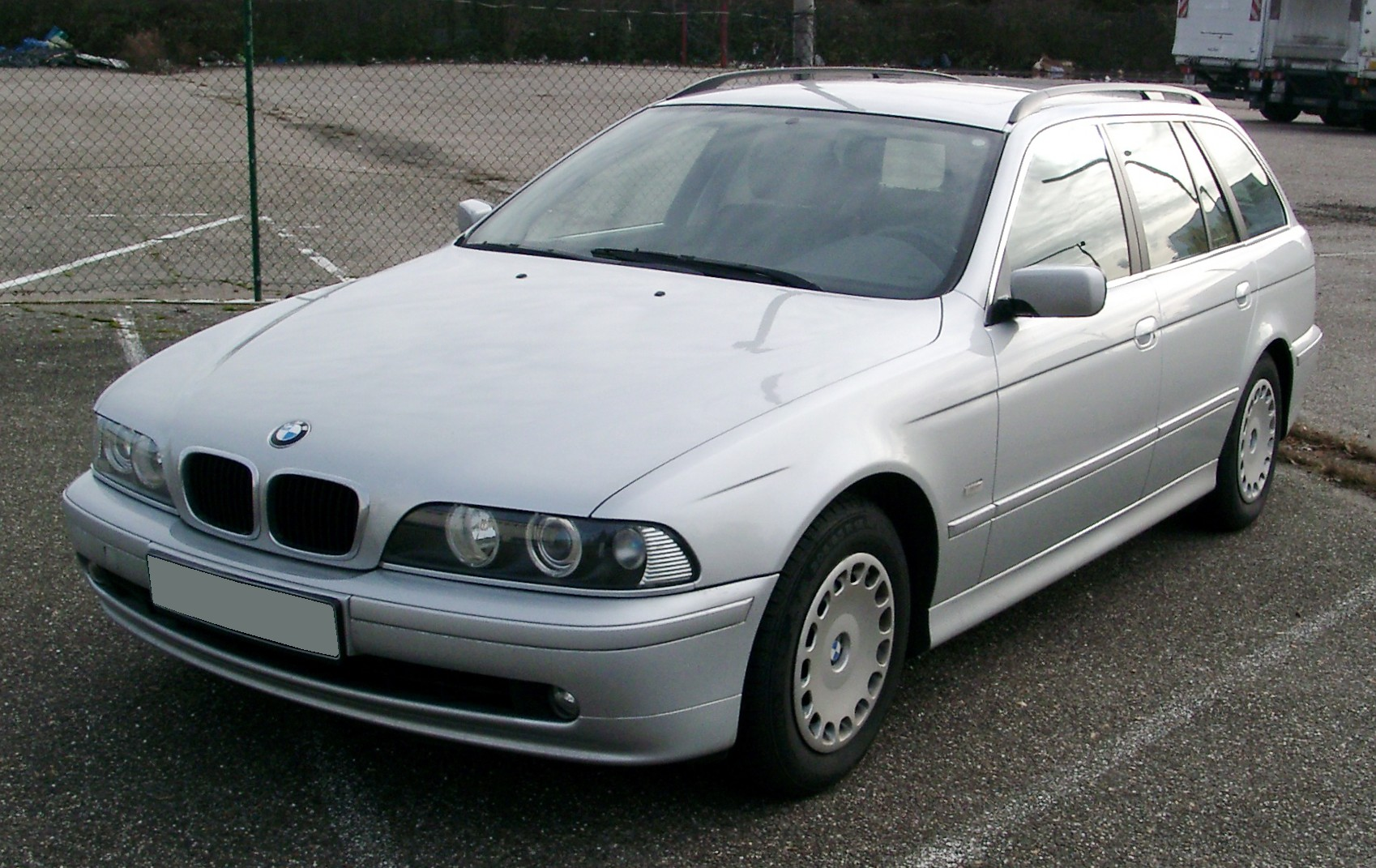
E39 Touring (facelift; front)

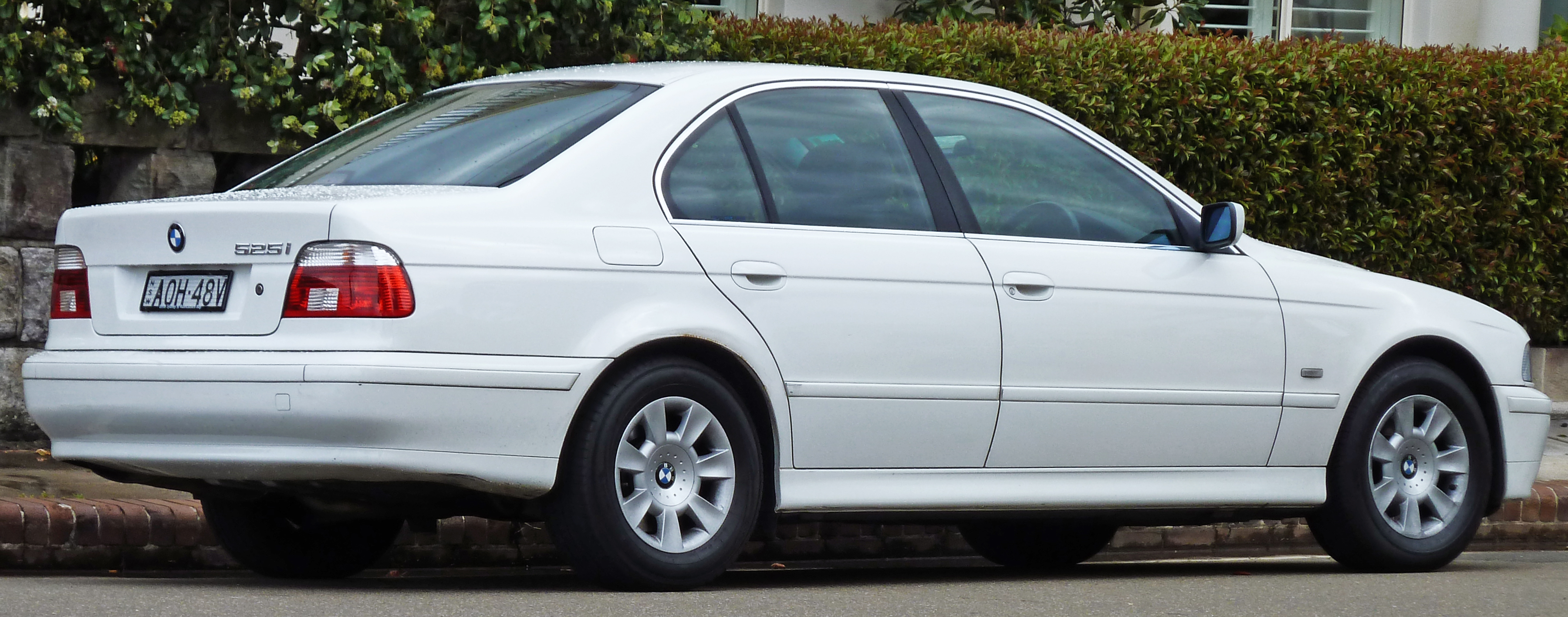
E39 saloon (facelift; rear)

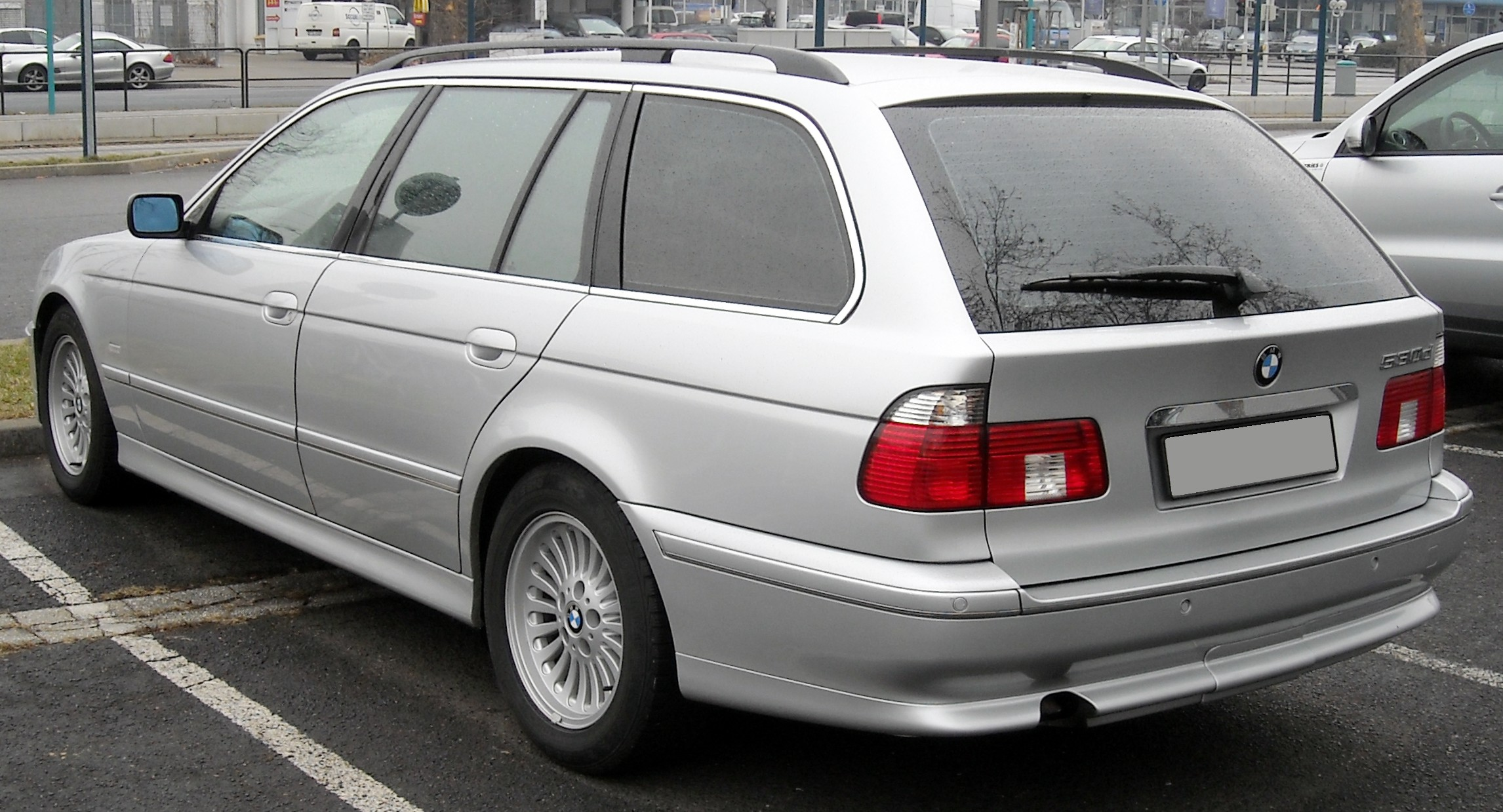
E39 Touring (facelift; rear)

=== 2001 ===
- Automatic transmission cars had the manual shift direction switched (to forwards for downshifts, backwards for upshifts).
- Front brakes were upgraded with 324 mm (12.8 in) discs and new calipers on six-cylinder models.
- Automatic headlights introduced.
- In-dash CD player becomes available on all models.
- Power passenger seat becomes standard on six-cylinder models and automatic climate control becomes standard on 525i.
- M Sport package introduced for the 540i

=== 2002 ===
- Navigation computer updated to “Mk IV” Used 2 DVD maps instead of 8 CDs).

=== 2003 ===
- Additional chrome trim added on the trunk (boot) and on the sides of the body.

== Country-specific model ranges ==
=== Germany ===
In its home country, the E39 was offered in the wide range of models. The extensive line up for pre-facelift models consisted of 520i, 523i, 528i, 535i, and 540i for the gasoline powered. The diesel-powered came as 525tds and 530d. Facelift was given in the year 2000. The 520i received the new 2171 cc engine which replaced the old 1991 cc unit. The 523i and 528i were replaced by the 525i and 530i respectively. The 520d came as the base model for diesel, and the 525tds was replaced by the 525d. The high-performance M5 was launched in 1998.

=== Indonesia ===
In Indonesia, the initial model range in 1996 was the 523i and 528i, with only the 523i available with a manual transmission. Following the September 2000 facelift, the line-up consisted of 520i, 525i and 530i. Indonesian models were assembled in Jakarta from complete knock-down kits.

=== Japan ===
The E39 sedan was launched for the Japanese market in June 1996 as the 525i and 528i, with 540i came two months later. The 528i Touring wagon was introduced in September 1997. The luxury Highline grades of 525i, 528i, and 540i sedan were added into the line up in March 1998, and the 528i Touring Highline joined in November 1998. A month later, the limited edition 528i Sport and 540i Sport became available with 17-inch alloy wheels and wider tires, sunroof, and upgraded sound system. In late 1999, the M-Sport version with aerodynamic body kit was offered for the 525i, 528i, and 540i. All the sedan models are available with either right-hand drive (RHD) or left-hand drive (LHD), while the Touring is RHD only.

The facelift model E39 was unveiled in November 2000. The 525i and 530i sedan were offered as base, Highline, and M-Sport grades, while the 540i could be ordered as Highline and M-Sport. The trim levels for 525i and 530i Touring wagon are base and Highline only. Multi-function steering wheel and DVD navigation system are standard equipment. In May 2001, the limited edition 525i and 530i Touring wagon with M-Sport Package were added to the line up.

The high-performance M5 sedan was introduced in April 1999 as LHD version only. Dynamic Stability Control is standard on the M5 and 540i Highline.

=== Malaysia ===
The E39 officially sold in Malaysia was locally assembled at the Shah Alam factory. Like the neighboring country Indonesia, the Malaysian models were the 523i and 528i for the pre-facelift, as well as 520i, 525i, and 530i for the facelift. All models have 5-speed automatic transmission.

=== United States ===
From 1997 to 1998, the E39 model range in North America consisted of the 528i and 540i, In 1999 the M5 was introduced along with station wagon (marketed as "sports wagon") versions of the 528i and 540i. For the 2001 model year, the 528i was discontinued and replaced by the 525i (525i Touring in estate/wagon format) and 530i (with no wagon variant in the US).

In 2001, the American market 540i's power output was increased to 216 kW (290 hp), unlike other markets where the 540i's power remained at 210 kW (282 hp). All North American models from factory arrived pre-wired for mobile phones; it was a dealer option to have a mobile phone installed into the centre console. The station wagon models were marketed as "Sports Wagon" and standard features included roof rails for mounting a roof rack.

In 2003 BMW sold the 540i M-Sport package as a limited production model in the United States, with 1,190 cars produced with a manual transmission. Upgrades included 18-inch wheels and various cosmetic features.

Sales in the United States for May 1999 to May 2000 were 19,294 vehicles. The following year, sales for May 2000 to May 2001 were 15,233 vehicles.

== Motorsport ==
The M5 was used by several teams in the Italian Superstars Series.

== Awards ==
Car and Driver featured the E39 in its "10Best list" six consecutive times, from 1997 to 2002. In 2001, Consumer Reports gave the 530i its highest car rating ever, declaring it the best car they had ever reviewed to date.

Other reviewers have also praised the E39 models.

== Safety ==
Euro NCAP scores (1998)
Adult Occupant:	4/5 stars
Pedestrian:	1/4 stars

The series tested for IIHS's "moderate overlap front" test and received 'Good' rating results, the highest available.

== Production ==
The first pilot production models were built in February 1995, with full-scale production starting in September that year. Most cars were built at the Dingolfing factory, with complete knock-down assembly used in Mexico, Indonesia and Russia. CKD production amounted to 17,280, with total production numbering 1,488,038 of which 266,209 units were Touring models.
