= Joji Nagashima =

Japanese automobile designer (born 1955)

- 永島譲二
- Born: 1955 (age 69–70); Tokyo, Japan
- Education: Master's degree in industrial design
- Alma mater: Wayne State University; Musashino Art University
- Occupation: Automotive designer
- Known for: BMW E90 design BMW E39 design

Joji Nagashima (born 1955; 永島譲二) is a Japanese automobile designer for BMW. He is best known for the exterior designs of the E90 versions of the BMW 3 Series, the E39 version of the BMW 5 Series, and the Z3 Roadster. As of November 2007, he held 22 patents in car design.

== Early life and career ==
Joji Nagashima was born in 1955 in Tokyo, Japan. He attended university in the United States, after which he relocated to Europe.

He worked at Opel in Germany and Renault in France, after which he joined BMW in 1988, where he continues to work. He trains and supervises young designers.

He designed the BMW Z3.

== Timeline ==
- 1955 – born in Tokyo
- 1978 – graduated from Musashino Art University Department of Craft and Industrial Design
- 1980 – Master's degree in industrial design at Wayne State University. Joined Opel
- 1986 – Joined Renault
- 1988 – Joined BMW
- 2009 – Visiting professor at Kyoto Seika University design department
- 2015 – Visiting professor at Tokyo University of Technology Design department

== List of design patents ==
=== 2005 ===
- D514,491 – Surface configuration of a trunk lid for a vehicle

=== 2004 ===
- D516,480 – Surface configuration of a side mirror for a vehicle
- D514,990 – Surface configuration of a front bumper for a vehicle
- D514,985 – Surface configuration of a vehicle, toy and/or other replicas
- D514,484 – Surface configuration of a hood for a vehicle
- D513,601 – Surface configuration of a trunk lid for a vehicle
- D512,675 – Front face of a vehicle wheel
- D512,673 – Surface configuration of a rear fender for a vehicle
- D511,725 – Surface configuration of a rear bumper for a vehicle
- D511,486 – Surface configuration of a front fender for a vehicle
- D511,129 – Surface configuration of a side door for a vehicle
- D511,128 – Surface configuration of a side door for a vehicle

=== 1995 ===
- D385,524 – Front face of a vehicle wheel
- D384,629 – Front face of a vehicle wheel

=== 1994 ===
- D406,252 – Automobile
- D375,715 – Exterior surface of a trunk lid for an automobile
- D374,206 – Exterior facing surface configuration of a side panel grille for an automobile
- D374,202 – Exterior surface of an automobile hood
- D374,201 – Exterior surface of a rear bumper for an automobile
- D372,695 – Exterior surface of a front bumper for an automobile
- D371,328 – Exterior surface configuration of an automobile
