= Tōkidenshō Angel Eyes =

1996 video game

- Arcade flyer
- Developer: Tecmo
- Publisher: Tecmo
- Composers: Hiroaki Takahashi; Takuya Hanaoka
- Platforms: Arcade, PlayStation
- Release: Arcade: JP: June 1996; PlayStation: JP: December 11, 1997
- Genre: Fighting
- Modes: Single-player, multiplayer

Tōkidenshō Angel Eyes (Note: Japanese: 闘姫伝承 ANGEL EYES, Hepburn: Tōkidenshō ANGEL EYES) is a 1996 fighting video game developed and published by Tecmo for arcades. It was released in Japan in June 1996, followed by an enhanced port with additional content to the PlayStation console in December 1997. It was Tecmo's first fighting game; some of the development team would work on Dead or Alive released later in 1996, spawning the franchise of the same name.

== Gameplay ==
Gameplay screenshot showcasing a match between Raiya Mikazuchi and Highway Star.

Tōkidenshō Angel Eyes is a two-dimensional fighting game featuring an all female cast. The original arcade game features eight playable characters with a wide array of character designs. Characters in the game include a biker girl, a volleyball player, a girl in a Japanese school uniform, a ninja girl, and one who uses a stuffed teddy bear to fight.

Attacks include standard punches and kicks as seen in many fighting games, but also includes special moves, and special techniques. Unique to the game however, is a system called "reverse combo correction" by fans and one of the planners who is inexperienced in fighting games. In a typical fighting game, as combo attacks are chained together, the damage decreases. However, in this game, the damage actually increases as the combo is chained. This results in each characters being able to carry out combos that instantly kill the opponent. Another feature is "homing jumps", which are special jumps which thrust you into your opponent.

== Development and release ==
Development began in 1994 after Ninja Gaiden II on the Neo Geo was cancelled. Tōkidenshō Angel Eyes was one of the first games to feature all female characters in a fighting game. Some of the characters in the game are traditional 2D sprites, while some of them are created from pre-rendered 3D models. The PlayStation version has 2D renditions of Kiriko, Reika and Lina as unlockable characters.

Tōkidenshō Angel Eyes was originally released in arcades only in Japan in June 1996. It was ported to the PlayStation and released on December 11, 1997. This port adds proper intros and endings for each character as part of a fully voiced story mode. It also had additional unlockable characters and an arranged soundtrack. Also released was a drama CD titled Tōkidenshō Drama Album, as well as a soundtrack CD.

On November 12, 2008, the PlayStation version of the game was re-released for the Japanese PlayStation Network's Game Archives, and was available to download for the PlayStation Portable and PlayStation 3. Hamster Corporation released the game as part of their Arcade Archives series for the Nintendo Switch and PlayStation 4 in October 2022, as well as the PlayStation version as part of their Console Archives series for the Nintendo Switch 2 and PlayStation 5 in August 2026.

== Reception ==
Reception

Review scores
Publication	Score
Famitsu	22/40
Ação Games - nº 125	8/10
Dengeki PlayStation	80/100, 90/100

Famitsu gave the game a score of 22 out of 40. Reviewers noted the unique nature of mixing pixel art and polygon characters, but noted it wasn't a major issue. They noted that it follows a trend of recent fighting games to include battles in the air, and noted they were fun but somewhat awkward.
