= Halo headlights =

Luminous rings in the headlight assembly

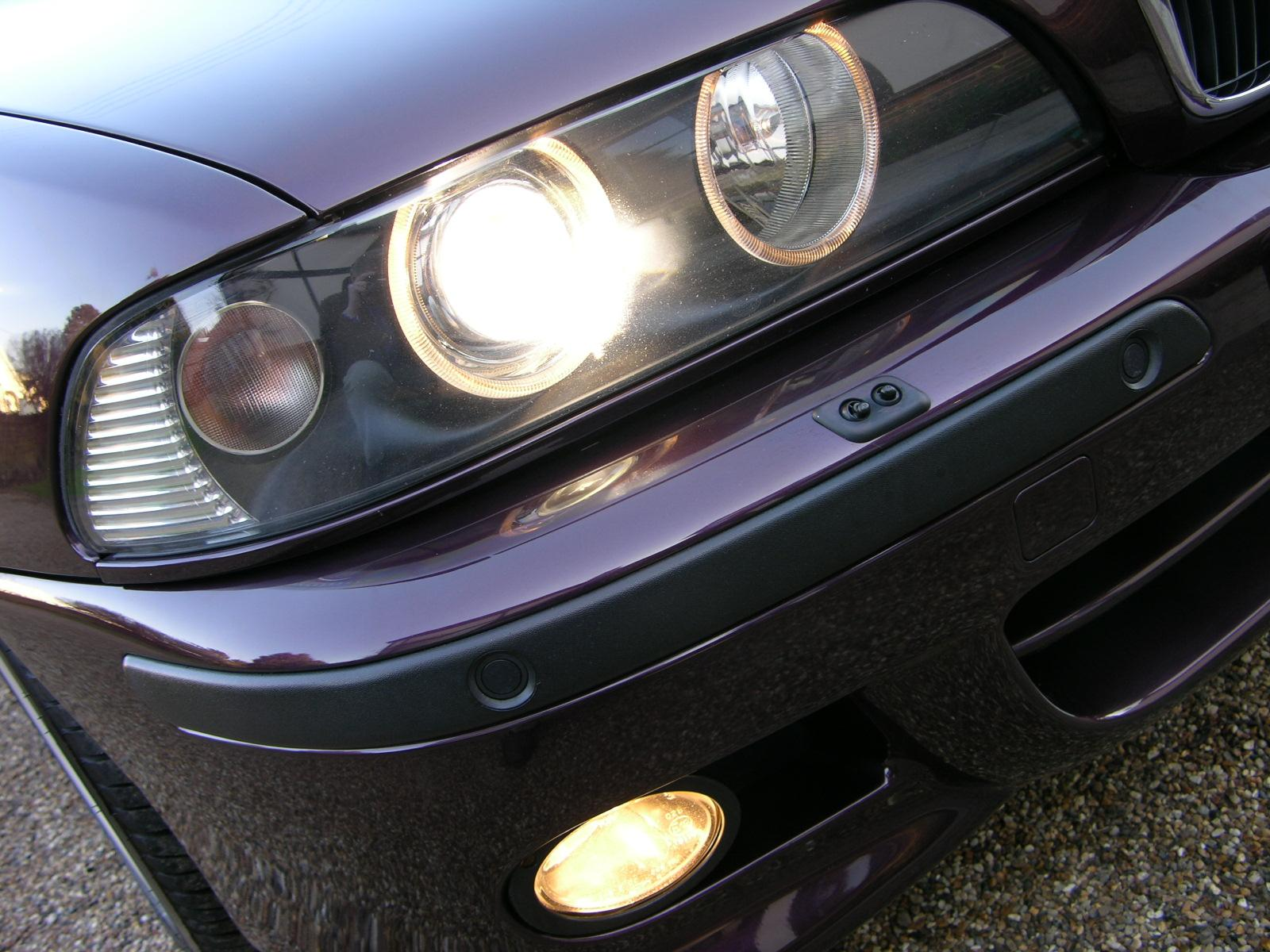
BMW 5 Series

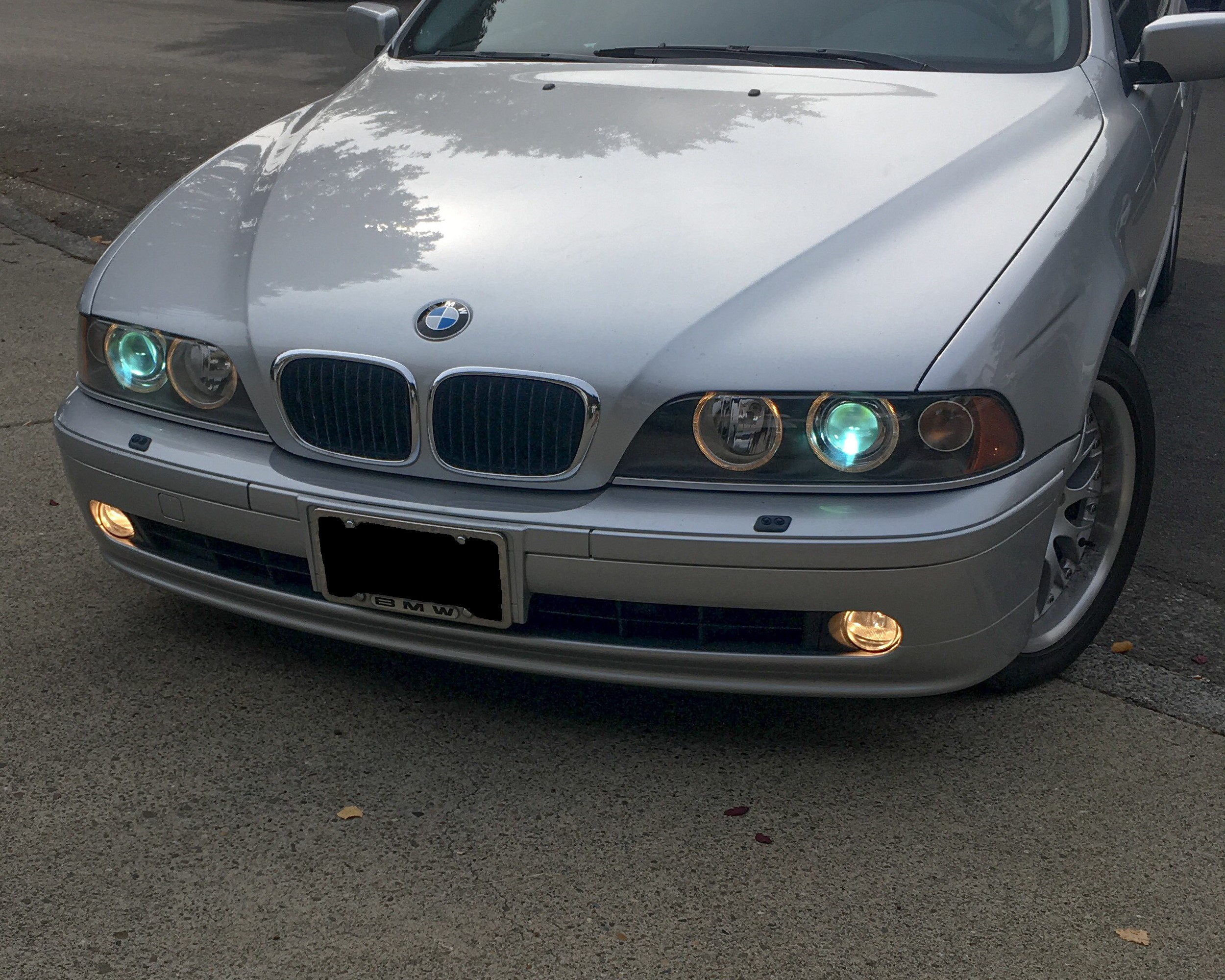
BMW 5 Series

Halo headlights (also known as halos, corona rings or angel eyes because of the distinctive arrangement of lights placed in a circular pattern) are automotive front lighting units with luminous rings inside the headlight assembly. Introduced in 2000 by BMW, halos were originally typical of this automaker's cars but soon became a popular customization option to enhance any vehicle's front end appearance.

== History ==
Since the time when early headlight technology was represented by an acetylene lamp with a reflecting mirror, headlights have evolved into the high-tech units that both create high-impact illumination and provide a way to customize the look of a vehicle.

Although composite headlight assemblies became widely used only in the 1980s, their bulky construction which utilized parabolic reflectors didn't allow for the freedom to create intricate designs. With an increasing use of less cumbersome projector lenses in the 2000s, automakers could implement innovative headlamp designs, including halo rings.

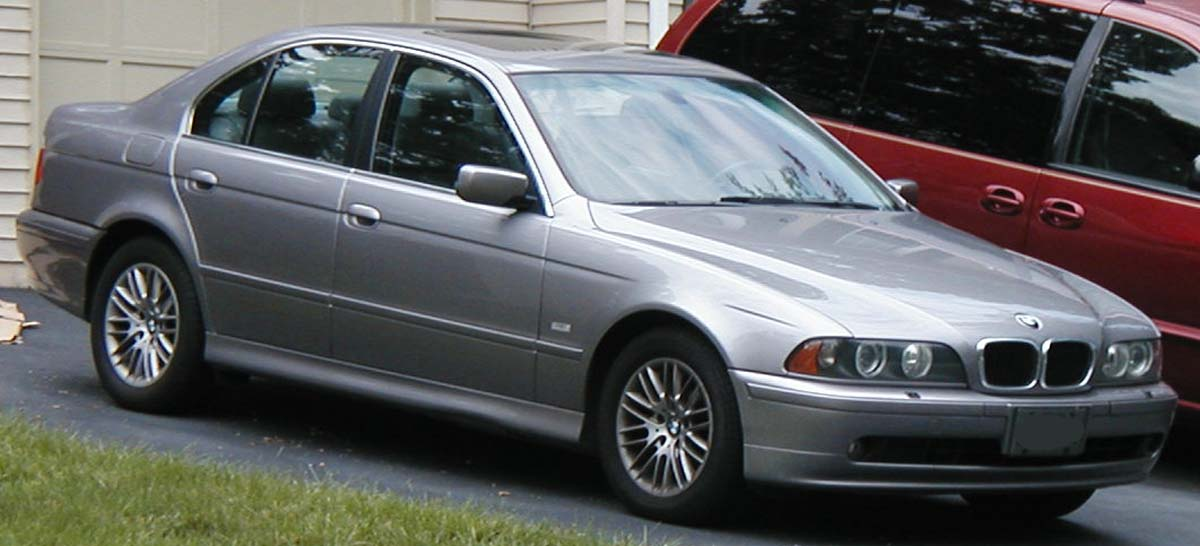
BMW 5 Series

Halo headlights were originally designed and first used by BMW on the 2001 BMW 5 Series (E39), a luxury sports sedan which soon entered Car and Driver's "10Best list". This was a breakthrough: halo headlights not only served as daytime running lights, but also created a revolutionary look that gave a sharp stance to a vehicle's front. BMW's inspiration behind their "angel eyes", had originally come as an homage to earlier BMW vehicles. The halo lights had been based on typical BMW headlight design, such as that of the cult classic E30 3 Series.

Halo headlights were called corona rings by BMW. Through constant improvement in technology, halo headlights could serve as daytime running lights (DRL) and also as evening city lights. Originally powering their halo headlights with halogen bulbs that used a fiber optic system to transmit the light along the ring channel, BMW soon replaced this source of illumination with super-bright energy-saving LEDs that powered corona light rings.

Modern BMW-designed halo rings are part of the BMW bi-xenon headlights. A signature element that served to distinguish BMW vehicles on the road, halo headlights were soon borrowed by other automakers. For instance, the Chevrolet Camaro and the Chevrolet Impala were equipped with halo-ring headlights.

Commenting on the new 2014 Chevrolet Impala design that utilized LED halo rings, Steve McCabe, the lead creative designer for Impala, said: “Impala’s new-look headlamps required a significant amount of attention to detail... As a result they help give the car a premium appearance.”

== Types ==
There are several types of halo rings:

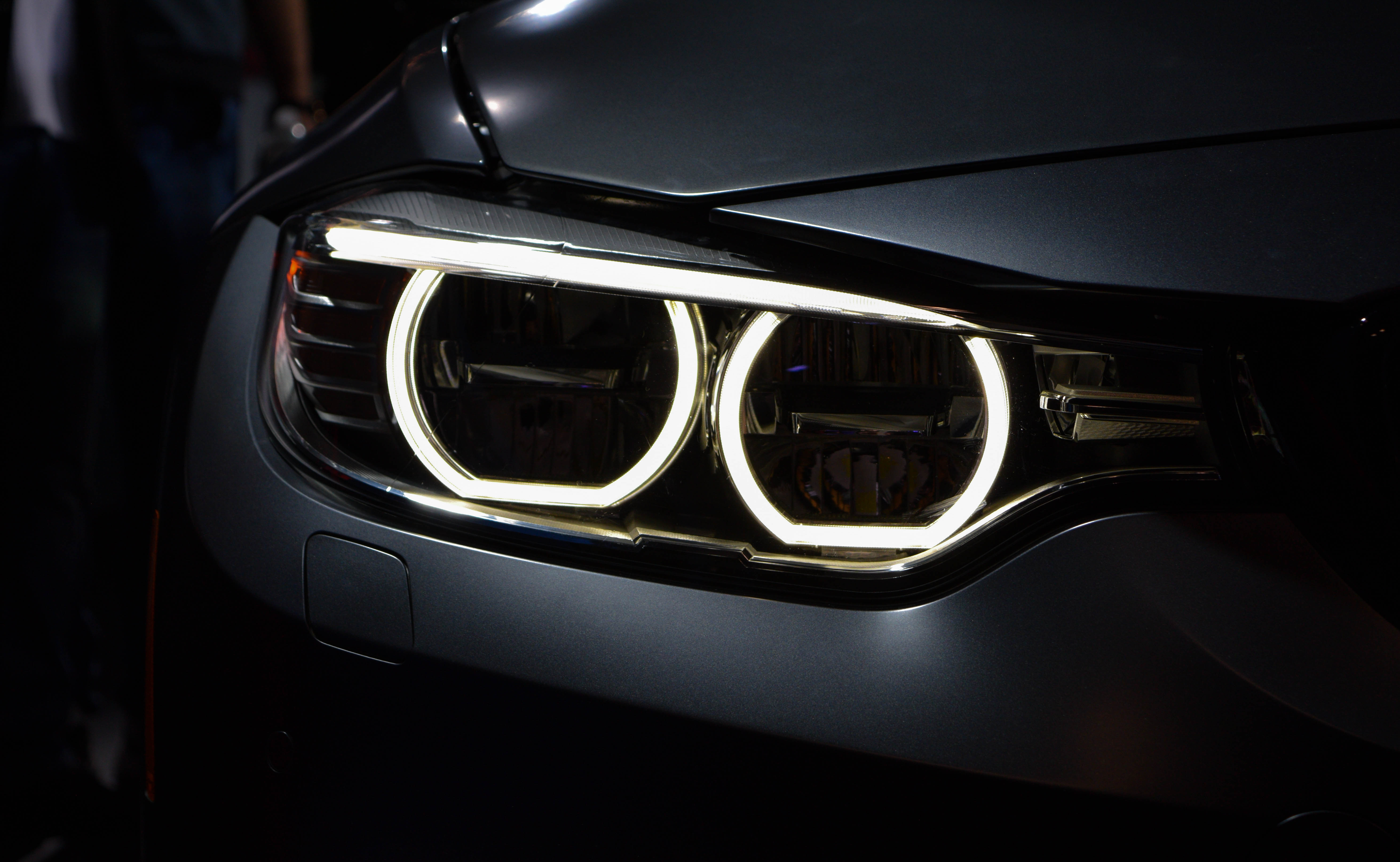
BMW M4 GTS Corona Rings

- Regular halo rings utilized by most automakers are illuminated by one or two incandescent bulbs that produce the distinctive “angel eyes” effect by creating bright and dark spots inside the enclosed ring.
- CCFL halo headlights use small cold cathode fluorescent lighting tubes filled with gas that burn cool, eliminating hotspots and discoloration. These rings are brighter and whiter than conventional halo rings that use incandescent bulbs.
- LED halo rings use bright light-emitting diodes. Because of a unique nature of LED lights that are made of layers of semiconductor material and can emit light of various colors depending on how these materials are chemically grouped, LED halo rings can change the light color on demand. Some colors fail to meet federal standards and are not street legal, intended for off-road use only.

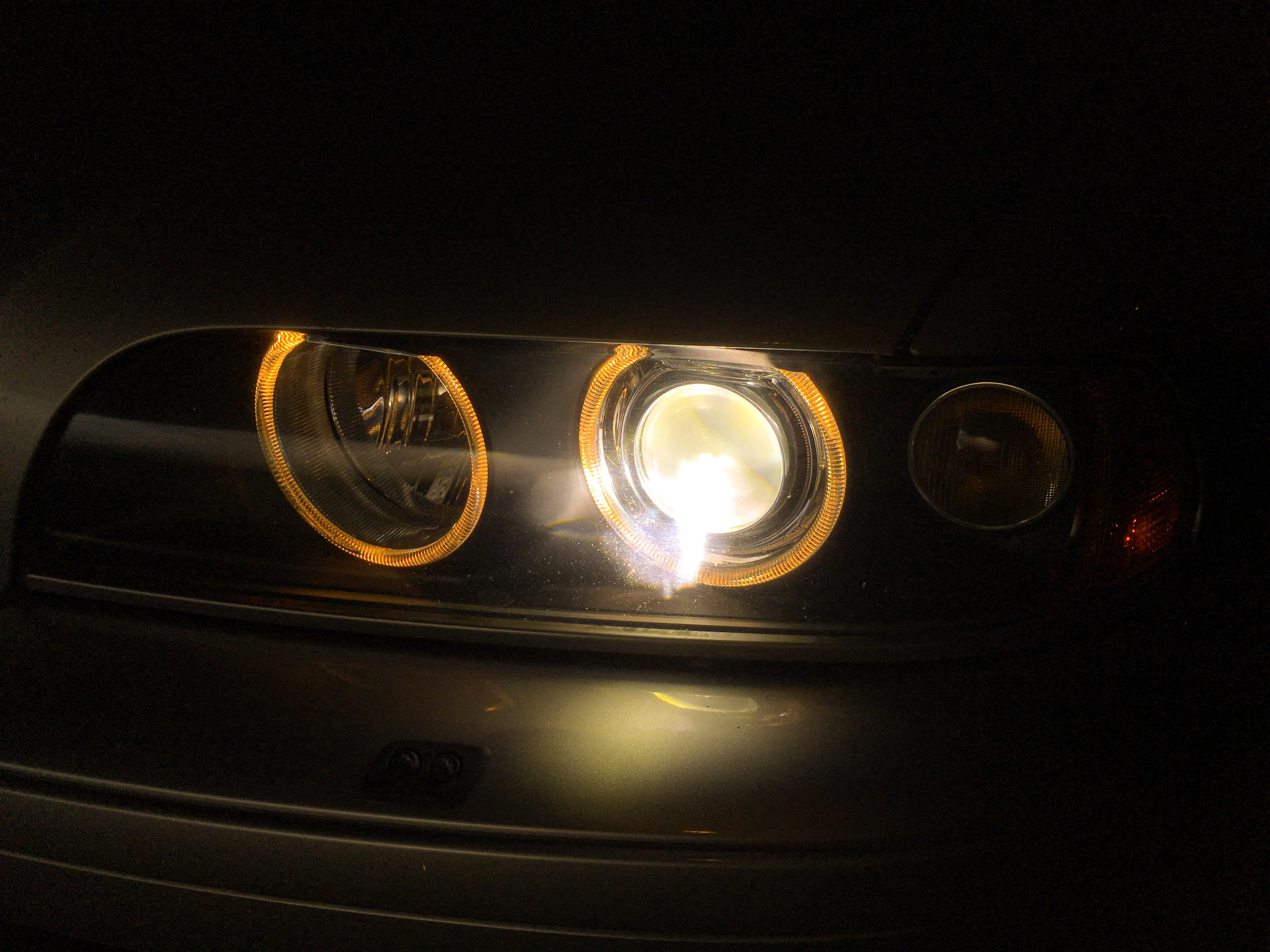
BMW 530i Incandescent Halo Rings

== Aftermarket LED halo rings ==
Aftermarket halo rings, often called "angel eyes," have evolved significantly since their inception in the early 2000s. Originally popularized by BMW’s factory-installed designs, halo rings initially used incandescent bulbs, cold cathode fluorescent lamp (CCFL) kits, or fiber-optic cables that transmitted light from hidden sources. While these early systems provided a distinctive look, they were limited in brightness, color options, and long-term durability.

The shift to LED-based halo kits began around 2007, offering greater energy efficiency, longer lifespan, and higher lumen output compared to CCFL systems. Early LED kits typically used side-emitting SMD LEDs mounted around the ring, which provided brighter illumination and improved durability. However, without proper diffuser lenses, these early designs sometimes exhibited uneven light distribution and visible hotspots

In 2008, an aftermarket manufacturer introduced one of the earliest forward-facing LED halo rings. By orienting LEDs toward onlookers, this design significantly enhanced brightness and visibility, transforming halo rings into both a functional lighting upgrade and a striking aesthetic feature. In 2011, the manufacturer released an external LED driver specifically for halo rings, isolating sensitive electronics from hostile thermal environments to significantly reduce failure rates and extend product longevity.

Subsequent advancements led to multicolor RGB and RGBW halo rings, offering full-spectrum color selection, dynamic lighting modes, and synchronization via wireless remotes or smartphone apps. Modern kits range from simple single-color white rings to complex digital pixel halos with zone control.

Today, aftermarket LED halo rings are available for a wide variety of vehicle makes and models, combining enhanced style, performance, and reliability that have cemented their status as a popular automotive modification.
