= Glossary of automotive design =

A glossary of terms relating to automotive design.

Some terms may be found at car classification.

== 0–9 ==
One-box form

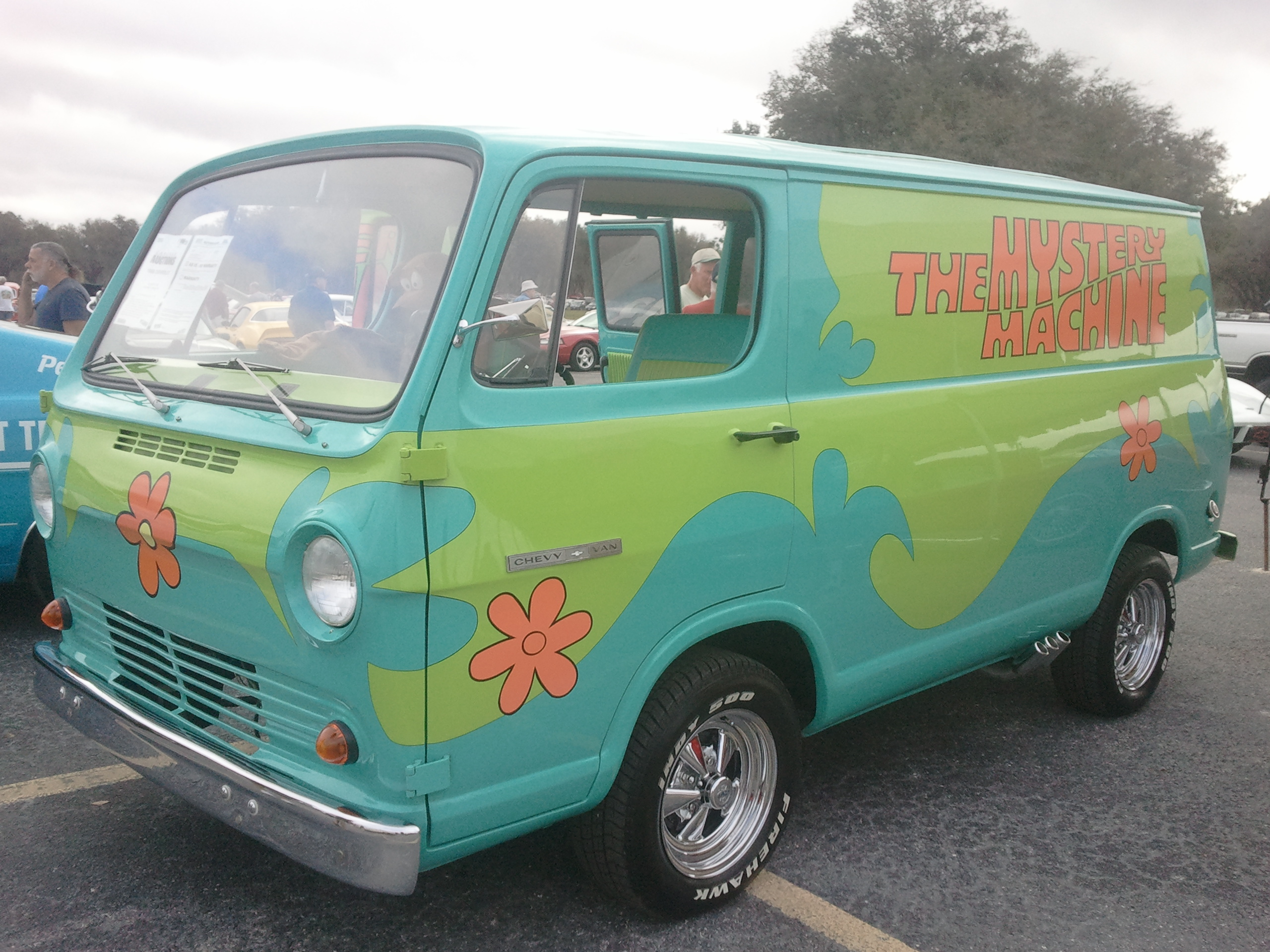
One-box form Chevrolet Van, replica of the Mystery Machine

A categorization based on overall form design using rough rectangle volumes. In the case of the one-box, also called a monospace or monovolume, it is a single continuous volume. Slight wedge formed front or rear are still generally placed in this category. E.g. buses and the original Ford Econoline. The equivalent French term is volume, which will sometimes be used by the British: "1-volume form".

Two-box form

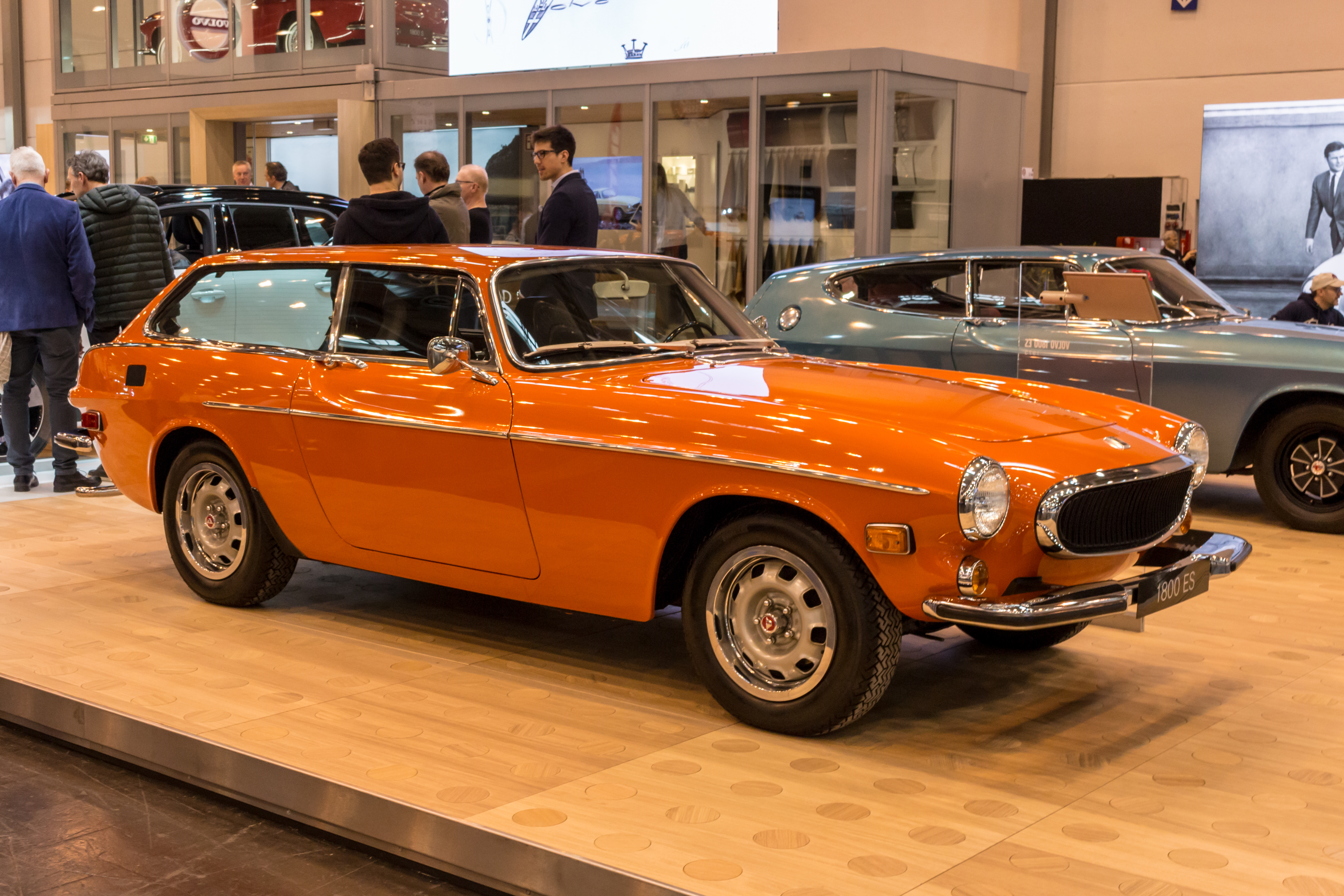
Two-box form Volvo P1800 ES shooting-brake

A categorization based on overall form design using rough rectangle volumes. In the case of the two-box form, there is usually a "box" representing a separate volume from the A-pillar forward and second box making up the rest. E.g., Station wagon, shooting-brake, Scion xB (2006). The equivalent French term is volume, which will sometimes be used by the British: "2-volume form".

Three-box form

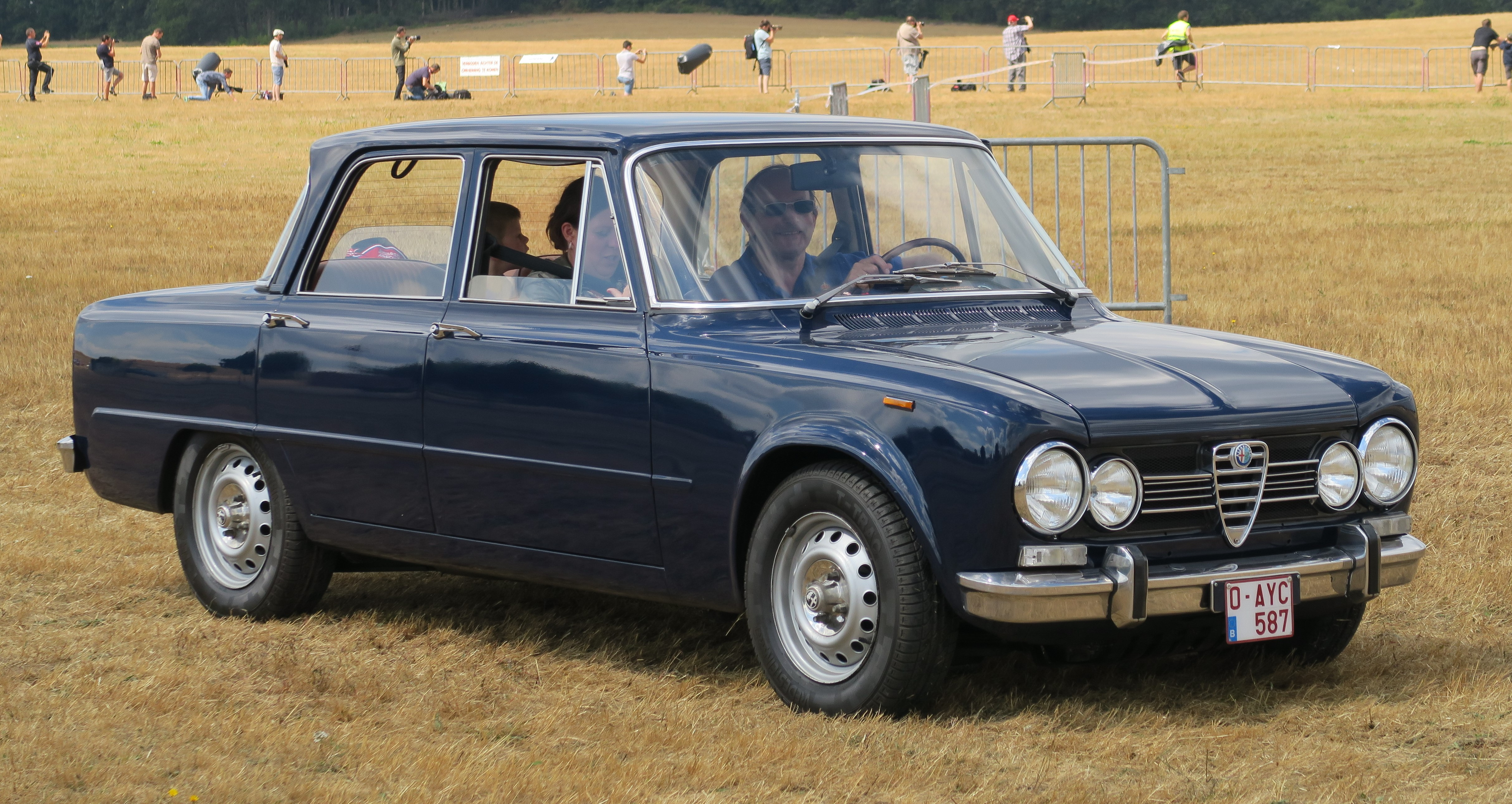
Three-box form Alfa Romeo Giulia (Type 105) sedan/saloon

A categorization based on overall form design using rough rectangle volumes. In the case of the three-box form, there is a "box" delineating a separate volume from the A-pillar forward, a second box comprising the passenger volume, and third box comprising the trunk area—e.g., a Sedan. The equivalent French term is volume, which will sometimes be used by the British: "3-volume form".

== A ==
A-line

The 1989 logo for the Opel Calibra emphasized the A-line

The line running over the car, from headlight to taillight, tracing the car's silhouette.

== B ==
Backlight

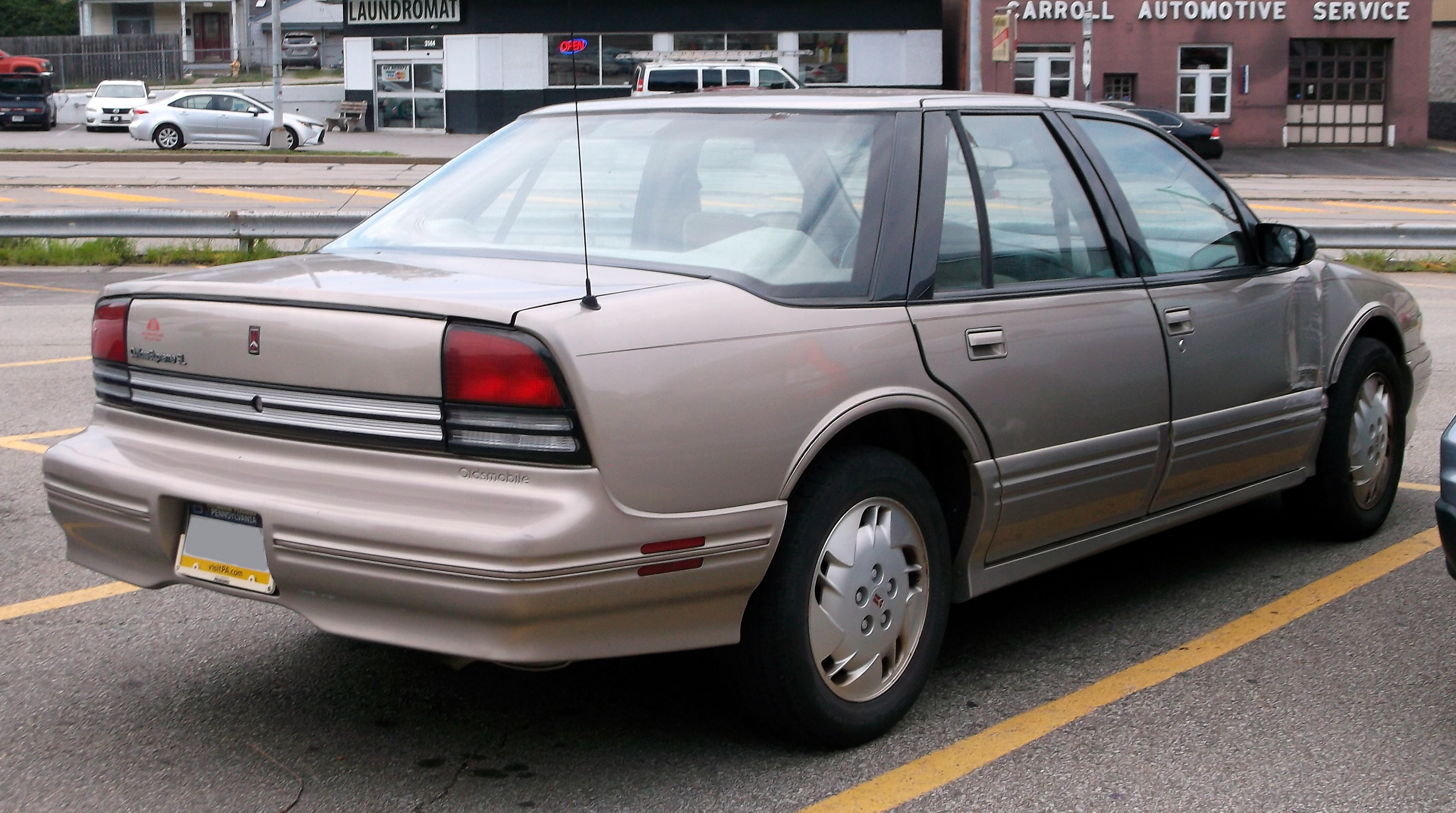
The backlight of the Oldsmobile Cutlass Supreme is curved to improve visibility

Rear glass panel.

Beltline

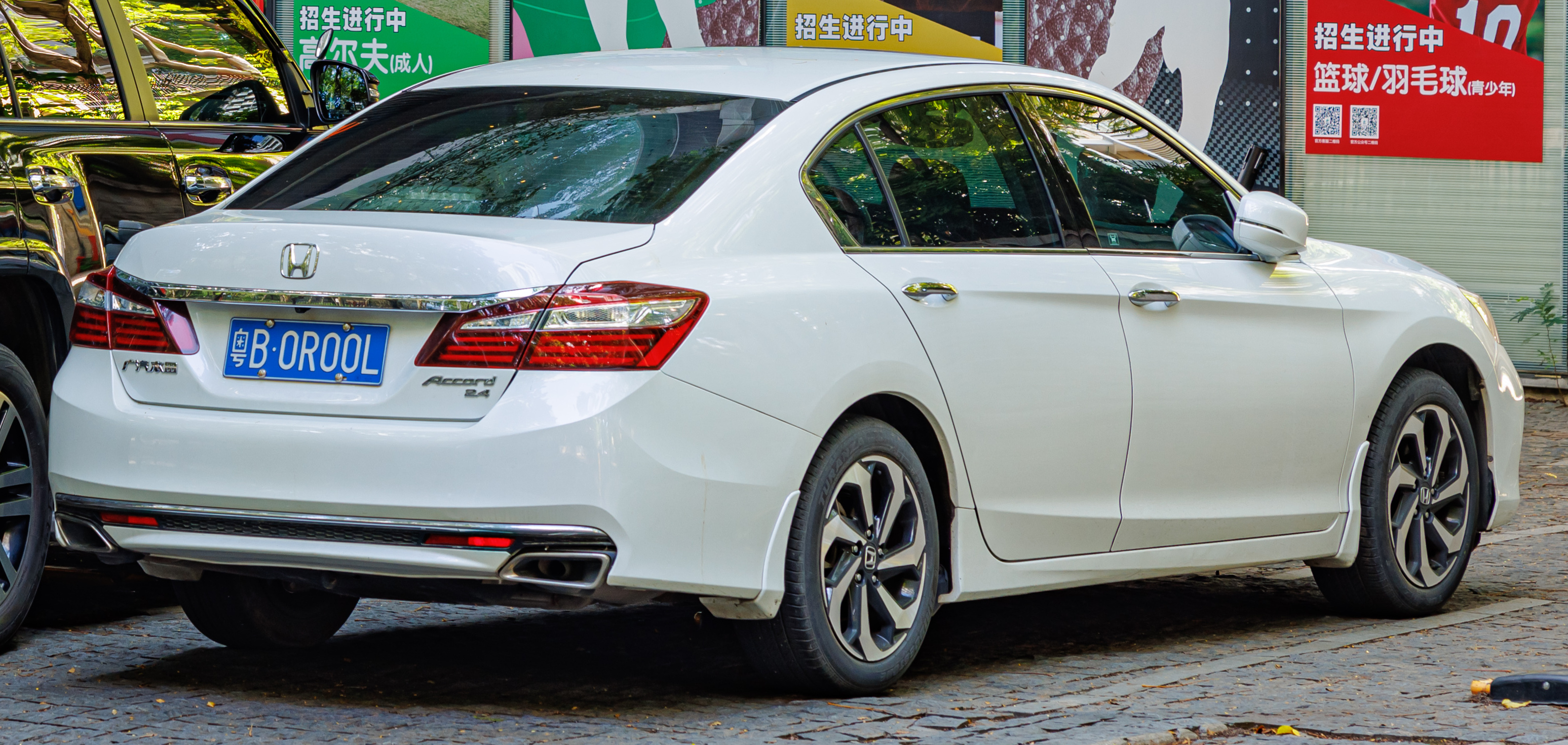
This Honda Accord carries a beltline crease running along the side through the door handles

The line running along the side of a car, defined by the boundary between the bottom of the greenhouse and the top of the body side. The beltline is not the same as the shoulder, which describes the shape of the body below the beltline, though these terms are sometimes used interchangeably.

Bezel

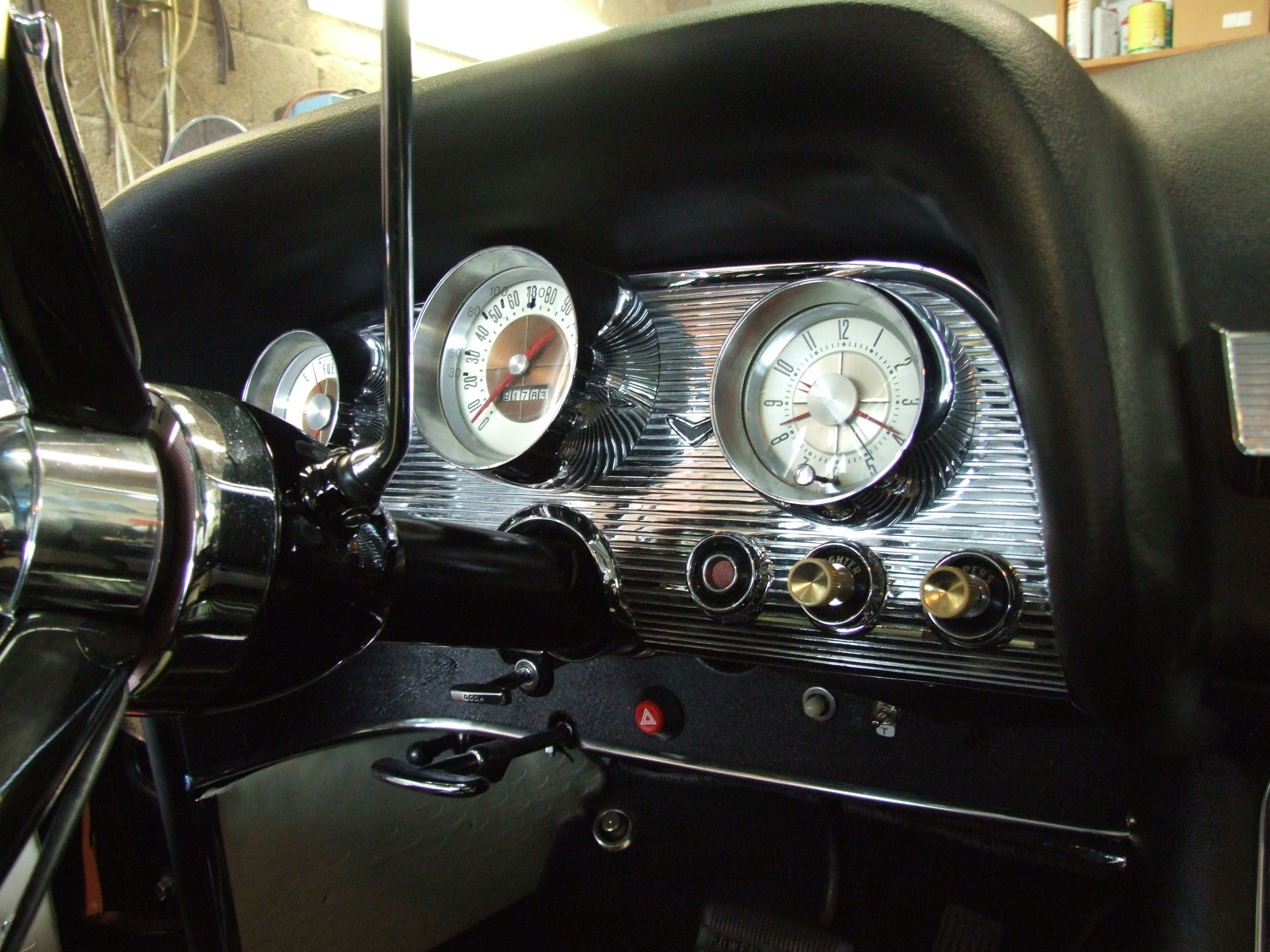
The instruments of this Ford Thunderbird are set in chrome bezels

The trim or bodywork that surrounds a light, holds the face of an instrument in position, or decoratively conceals gaps between bodywork and components as an escutcheon. Often chrome or plastic

Binnacle

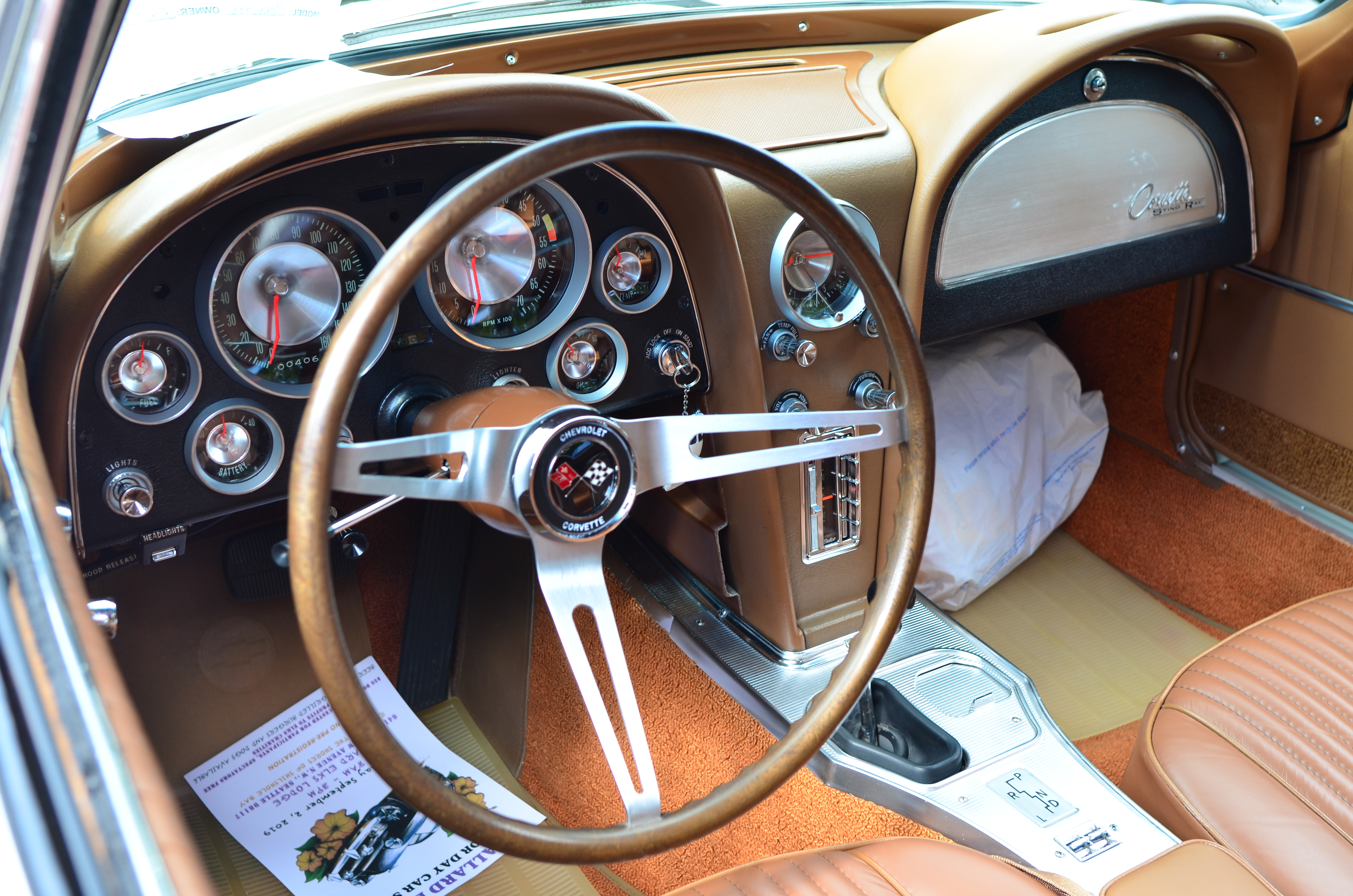
Twin binnacles of Chevrolet Corvette (C2)

The housing for the instrument cluster on top of or as part of the dashboard.

Boat tail

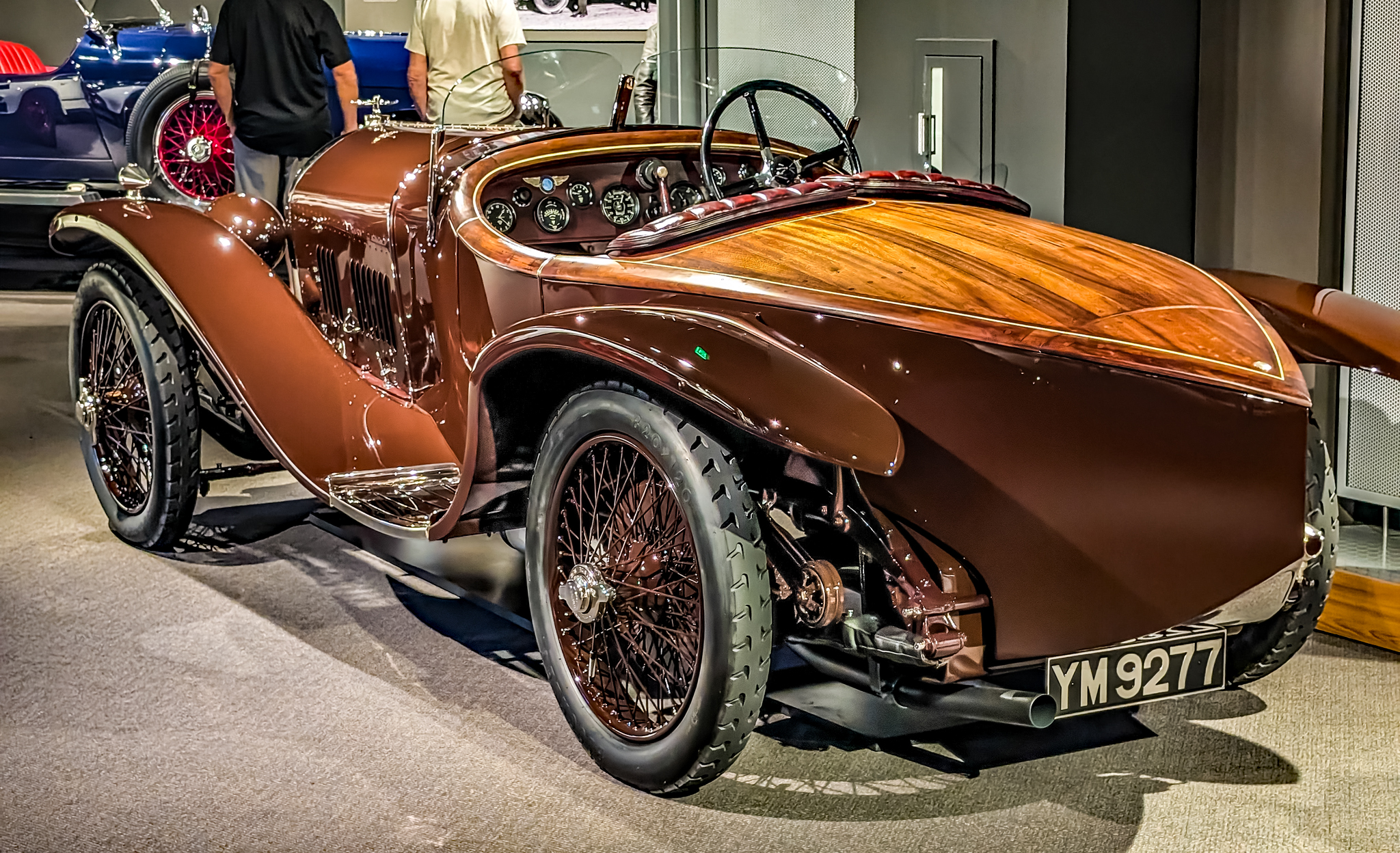
The use of wood on the rear of this 1926 Bentley 3 Litre Super Sport reflects a nautical aesthetic.

A tapered rear end design resembling the prow of a boat, popular on touring cars and American speedsters of the 1920s and 1930s.

Bonnet

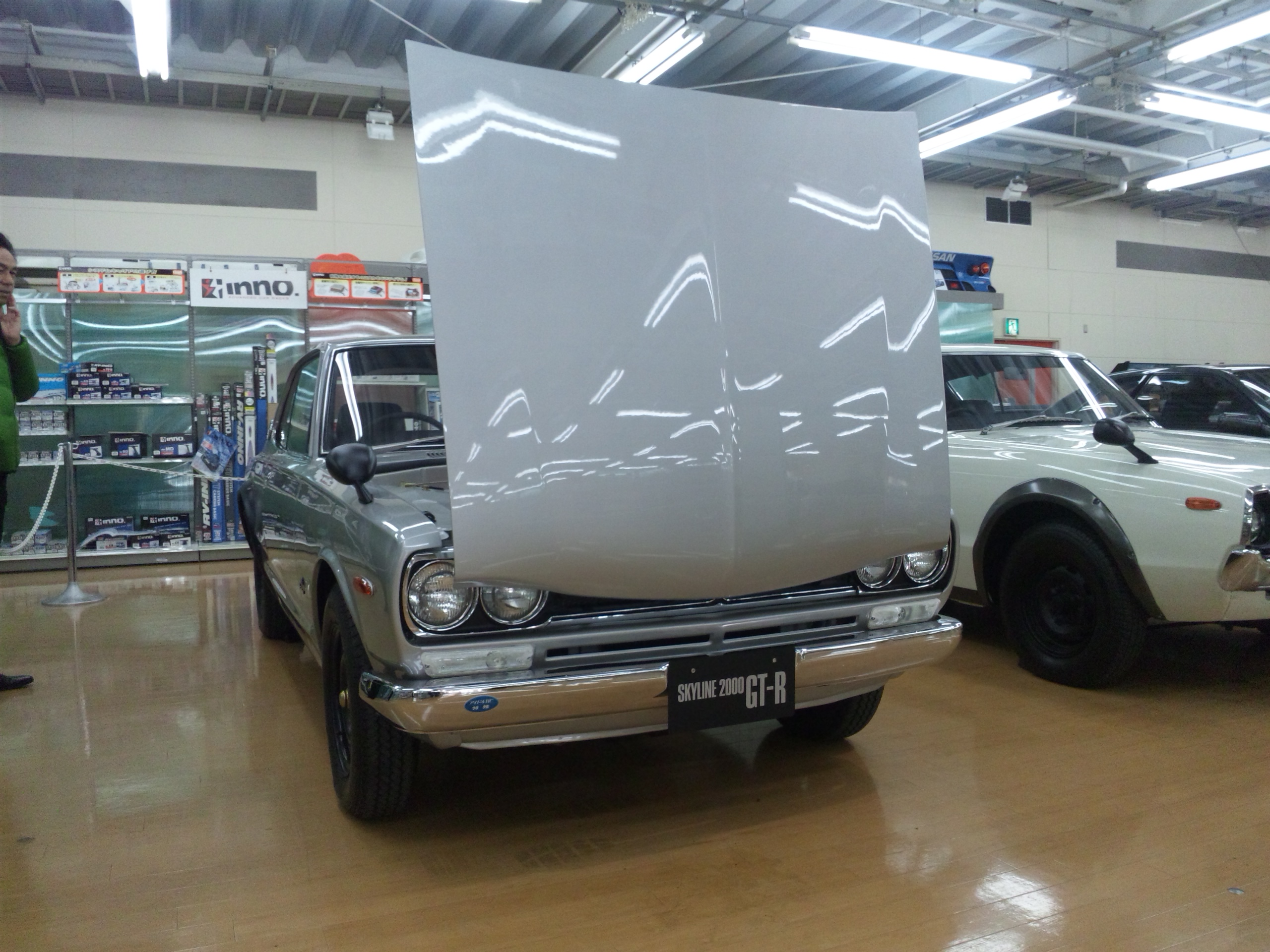
Front-hinged bonnet of a Nissan Skyline (KPGC10)

The body panel of the vehicle that covers the engine. Typically a horizontal surface, hinged at the cowl, but sometimes hinged at the headlights instead. Also known as a hood.

Boot

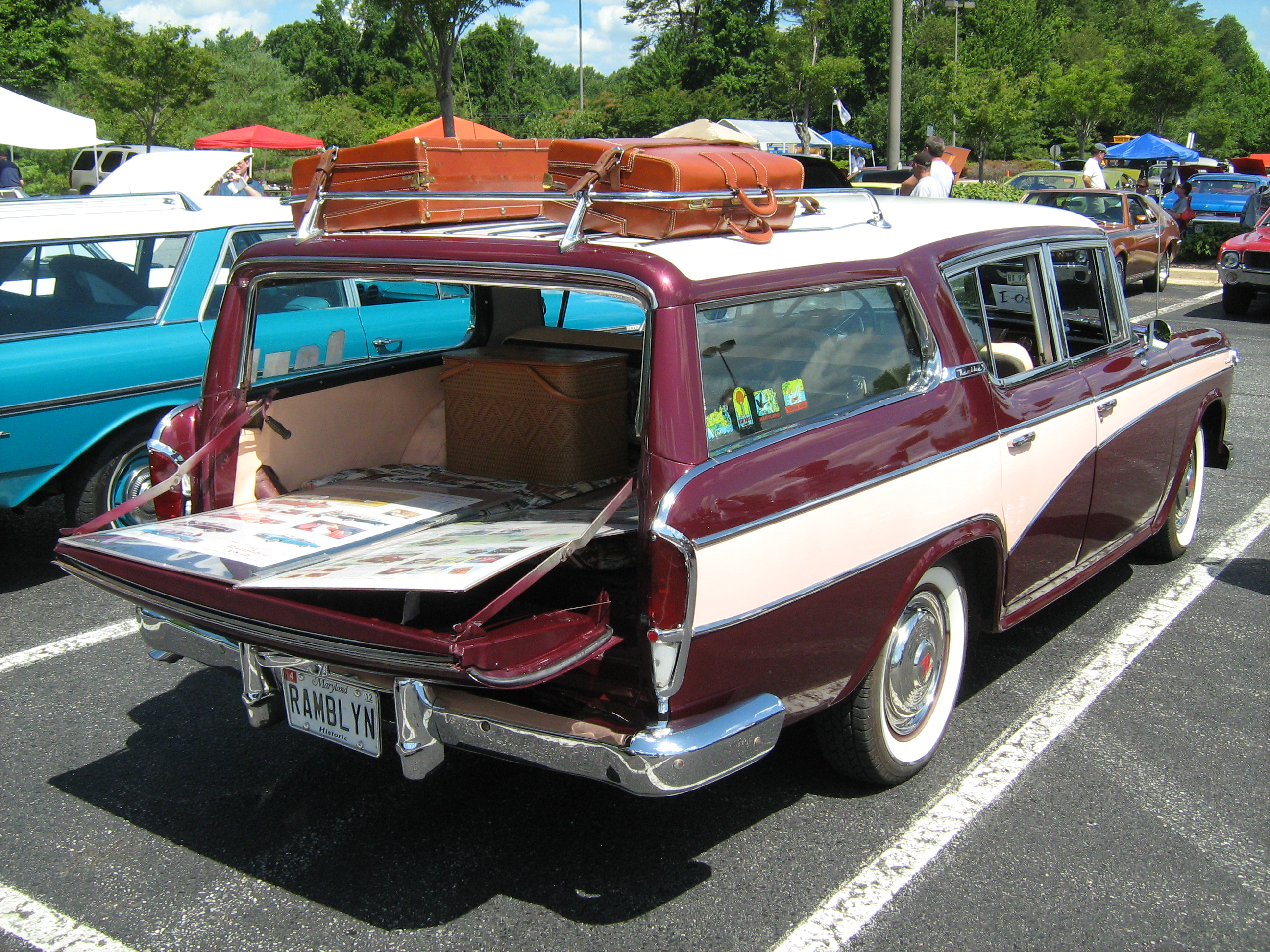
1957 Rambler Custom estate / station wagon with opened boot

The trunk or liftgate of the vehicle that opens for access to the cargo area. Typically at the rear of the vehicle.

Brightwork

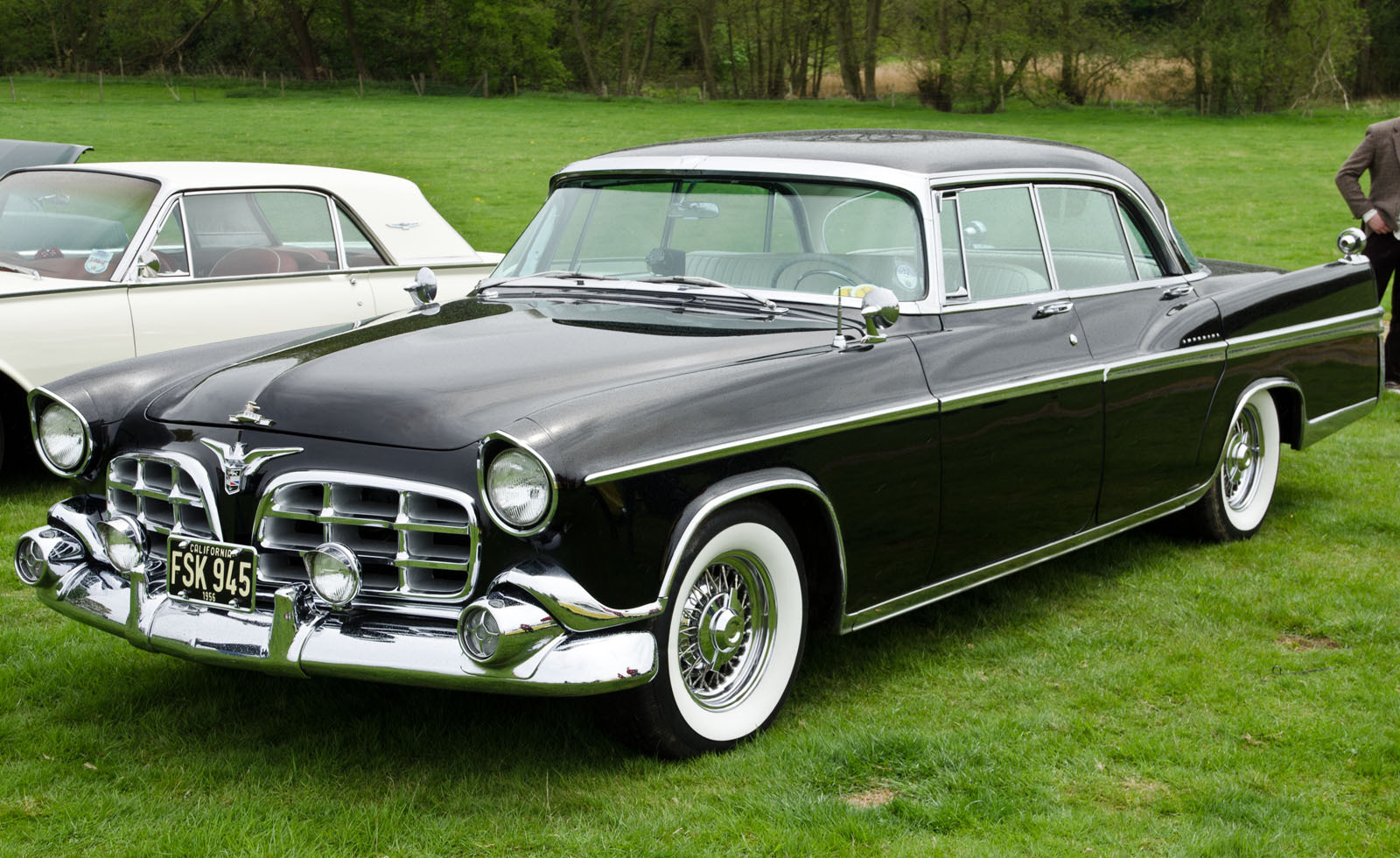
Virgil Exner's design for the 1955–56 Imperial included extensive brightwork in the grille, bumper, wheels, and window trim

Anything reflective added to a car to enhance appearance. May also be called chrome.

Body in White

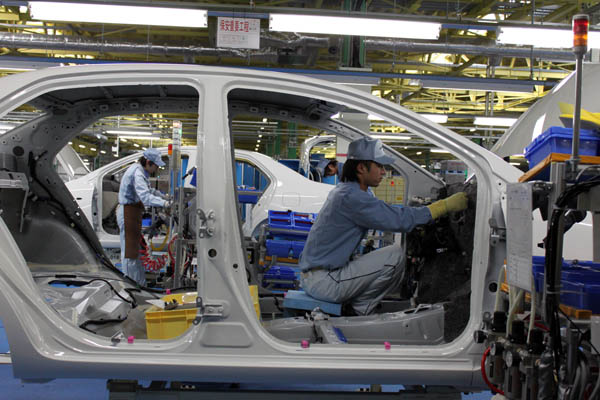
Worker fits components to this body in white of a Toyota Corolla at the Ōhira, Miyagi plant

Base chassis before customisation.

Butterfly doors

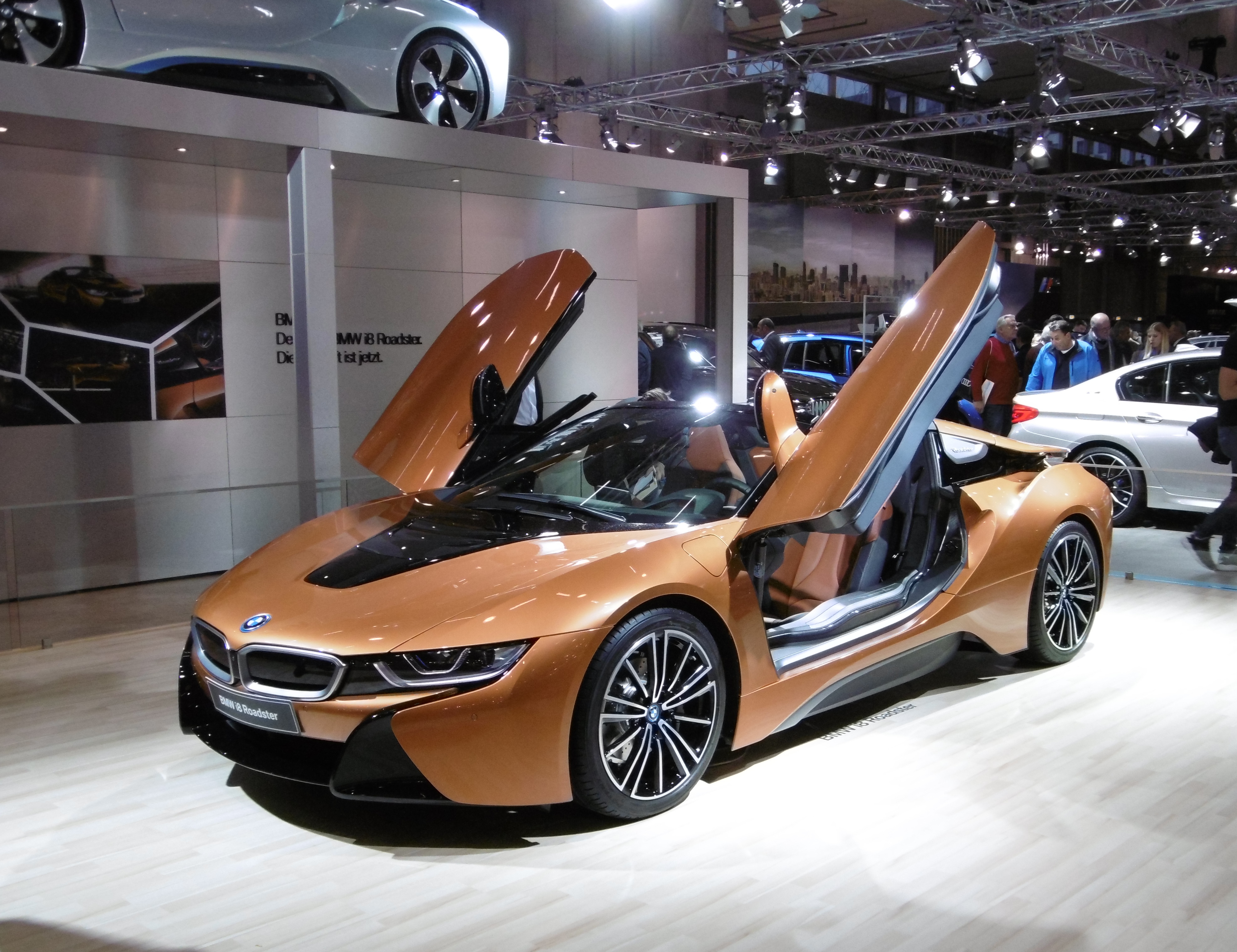
BMW i8 with open butterfly doors

A type of door sometimes seen on high-performance cars. They are similar to but distinguished from scissor doors by their hinge point. While scissor doors move straight up via hinge points at the bottom of the A-pillar, butterfly doors move up and out via hinges along the A-pillar.

Bustle back

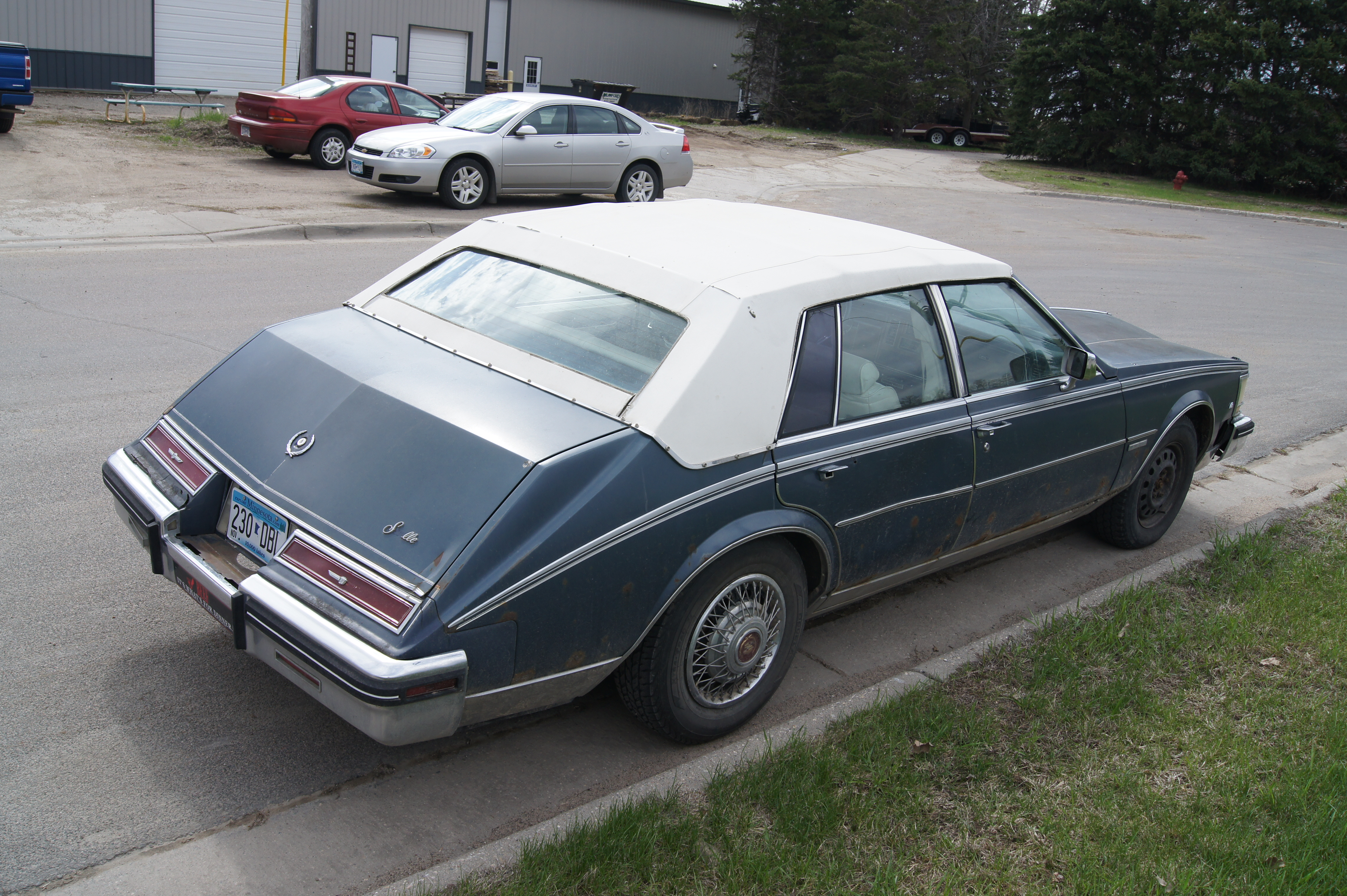
Bustle back of a Cadillac Seville

First seen on the second generation Cadillac Seville, this was a short lived design trend. Inspired by the English coachbuilder Hooper & Co.'s "Empress Line" designs from the early 1950s, these were a unique take on trunk–body integration allowing for a shortened trunk and a rakish rear end.

== C ==
Cab

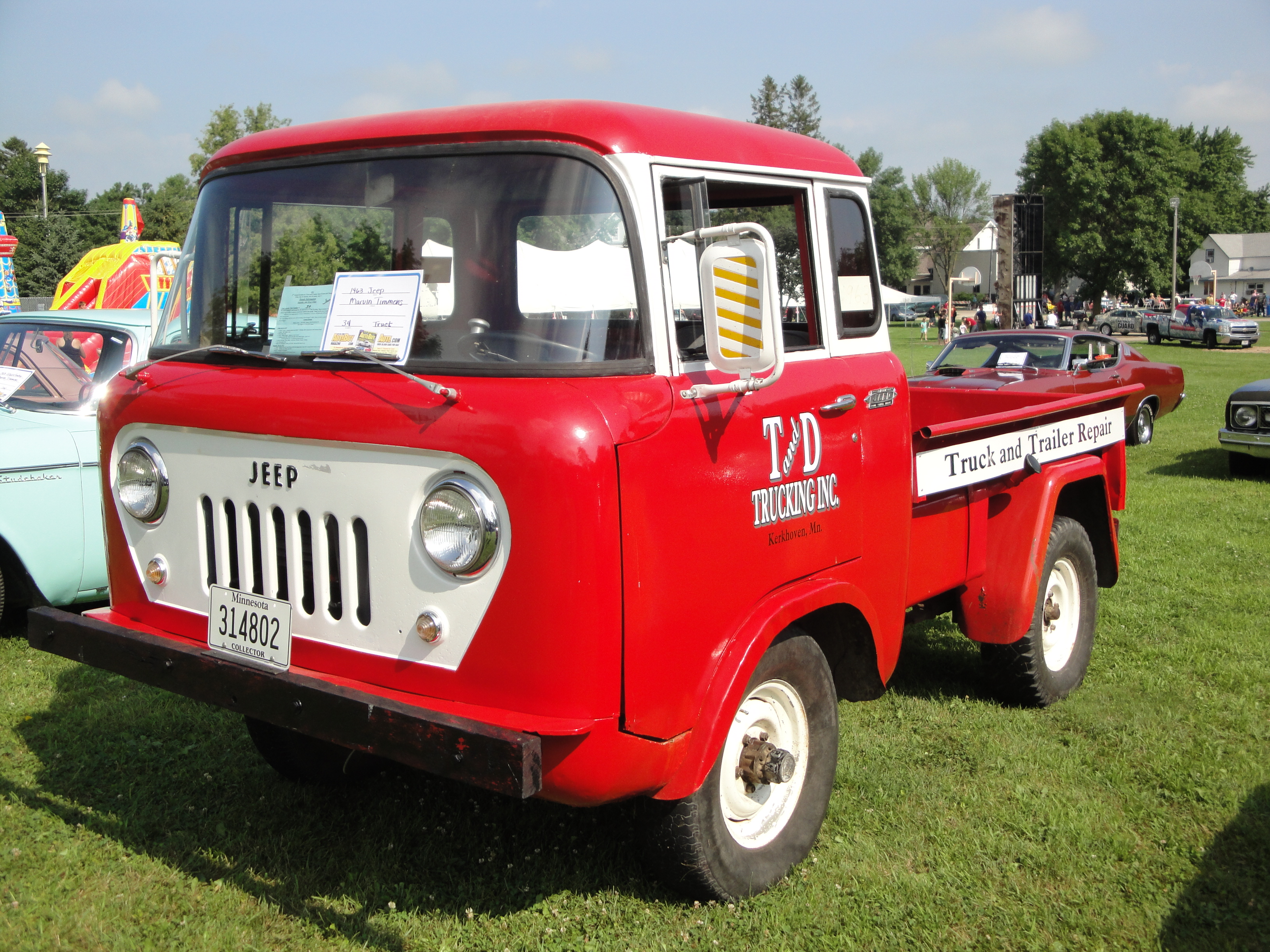
The cabin of the Jeep Forward Control is on top of the front axle

Short for cabin. The enclosed compartment of a vehicle which contains the driver and passengers.

Cab back

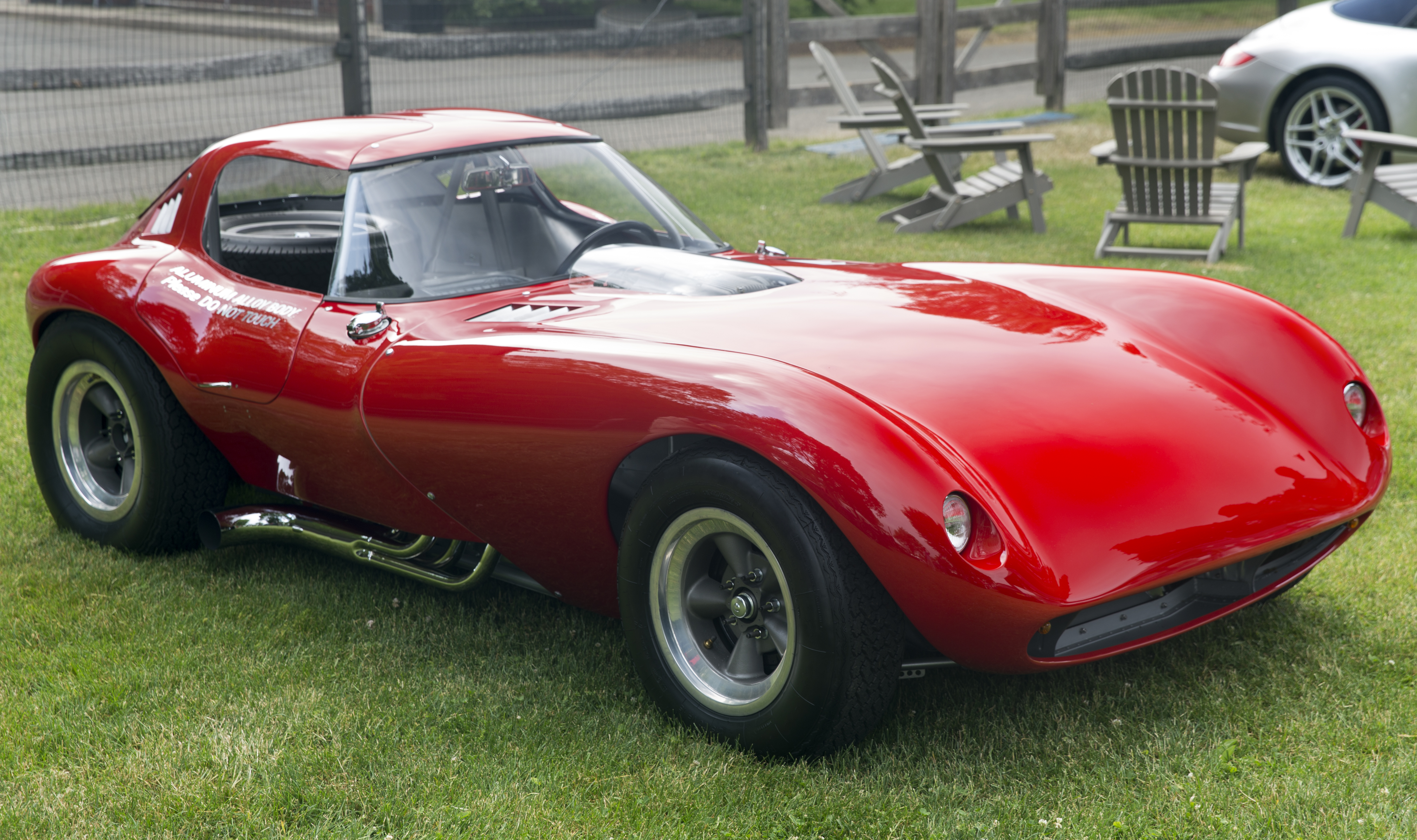
The Bill Thomas Cheetah has a long bonnet and short rear deck, typical of cab back designs

The cab of the vehicle is moved to the rear of the vehicle. Cars such as a 1970s Corvette could be considered cab back design.

Cab forward

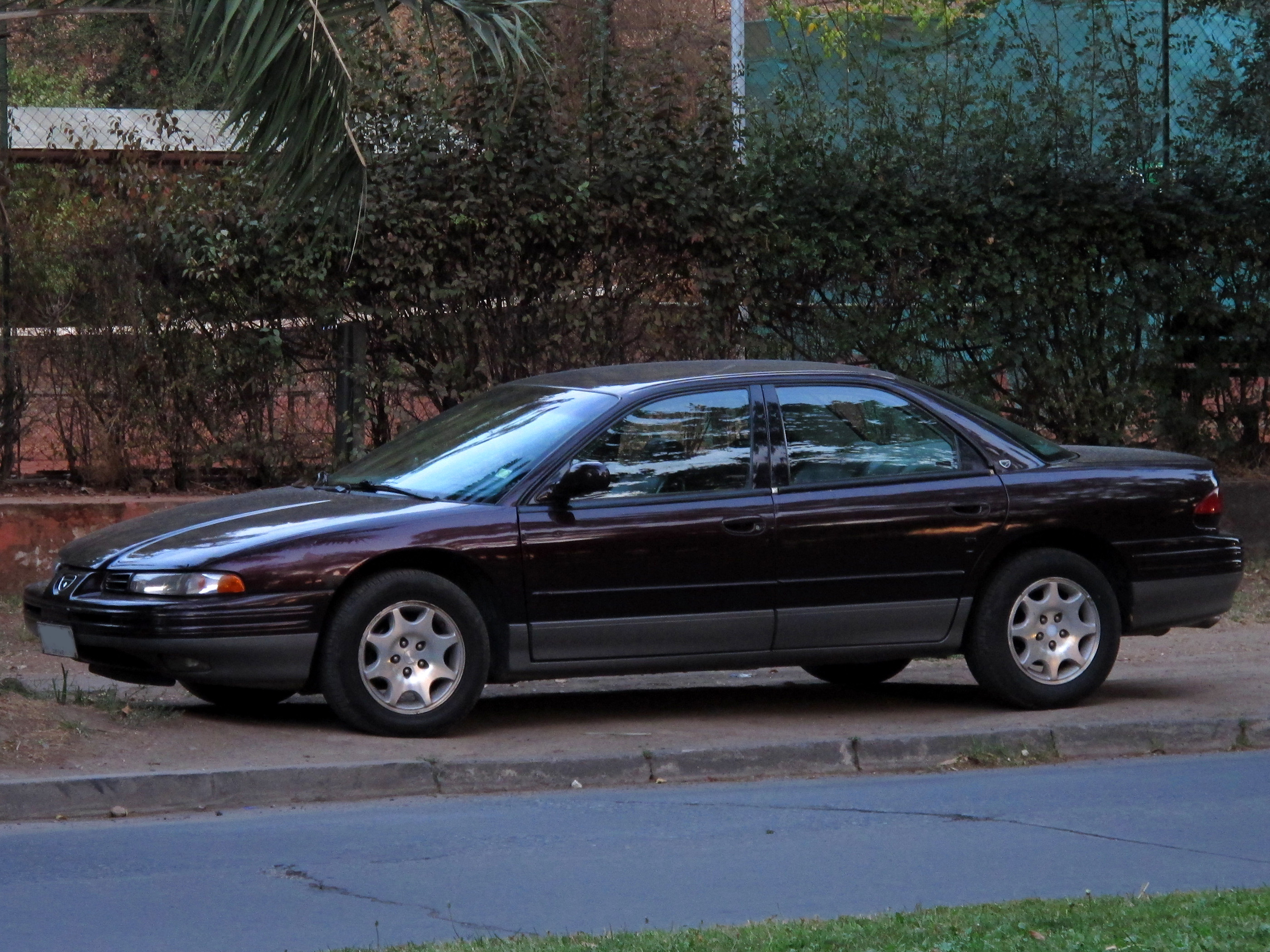
In cab forward designs like this Eagle Vision, the base of the windshield is pulled forward over the front wheels

The cab of the vehicle is pushed forward. This design aesthetic was popular with Chrysler in the 1990s with the introduction of their LH platform cars.

Carrosserie

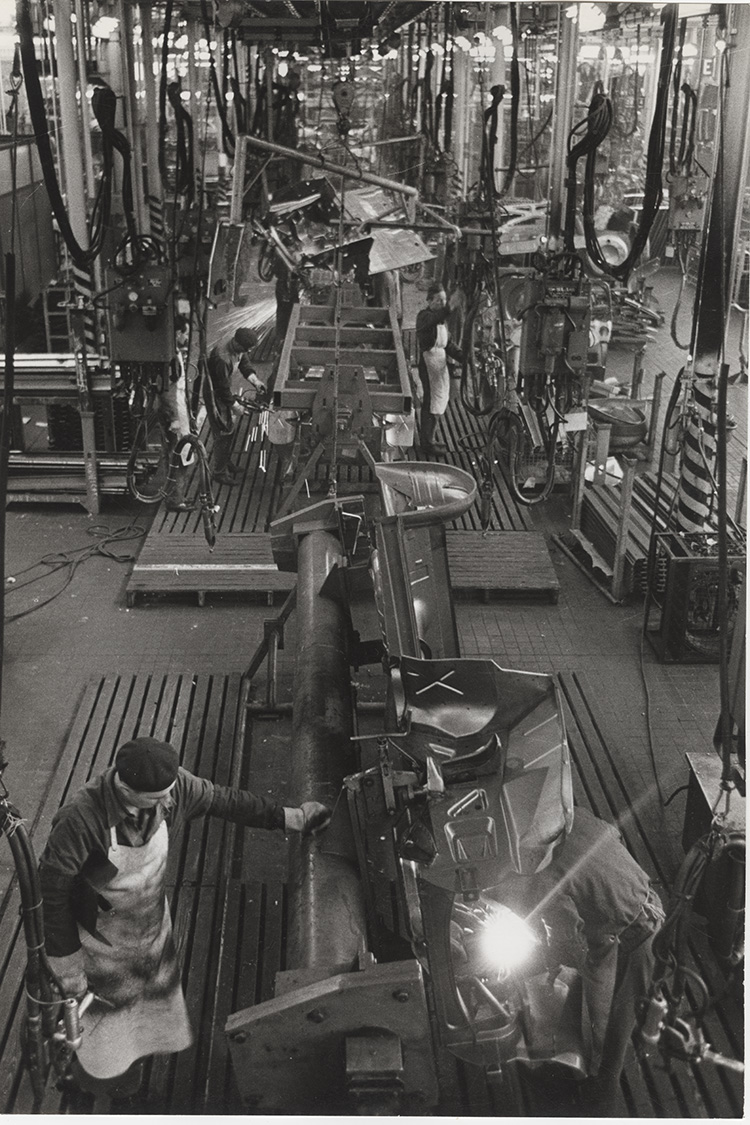
Workers at the Alfa Romeo Arese plant assembling bodies

Bodywork of a vehicle. Also the workshop at which automotive body work is built on a prototype or low volume production basis, typically with extensive handwork.

Character line

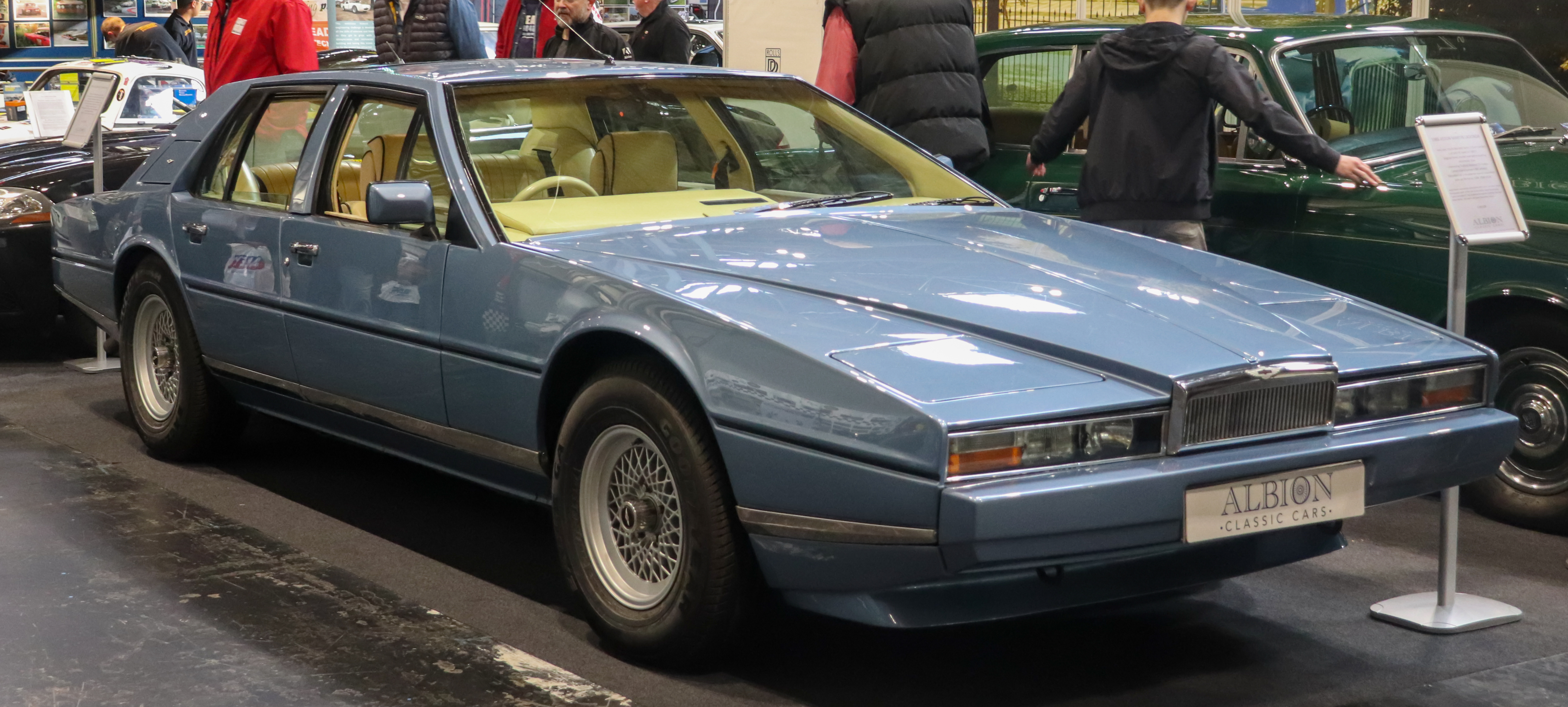
The distinct character line of this Aston Martin Lagonda (series 2) runs horizontally from tip to tail, interrupted at each wheel arch.

A line creased into the side of a car to give it visual interest. (interchangeable with swage line) Sometimes implemented by a rubbing strip.

Chrome

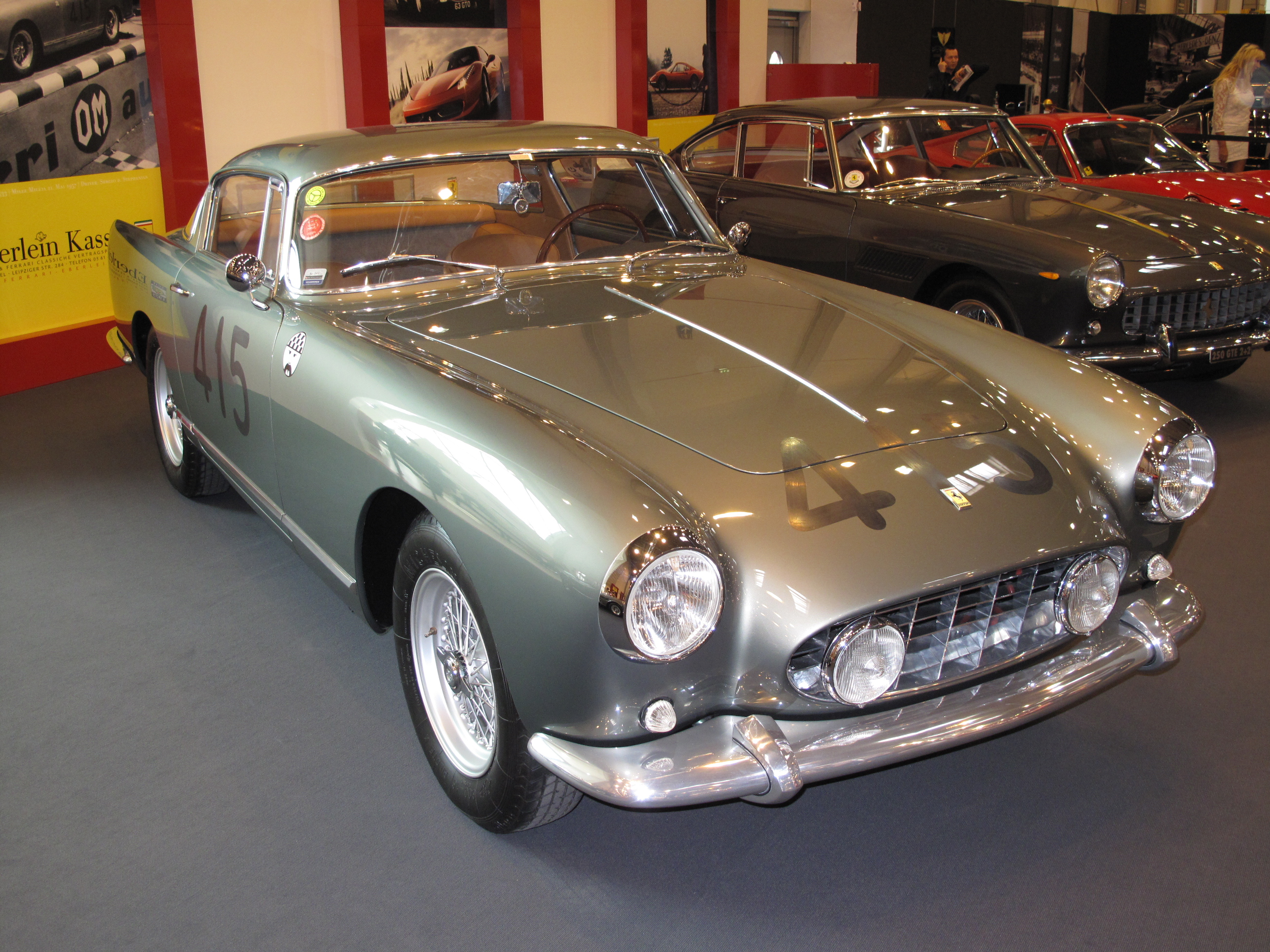
Chrome details on this Ferrari 250 GT Coupé "Boano" include the window frames, rear view mirrors, wiper arms, headlight bezels, front grille, and bumper.

Brightwork using chrome plating.

Cladding

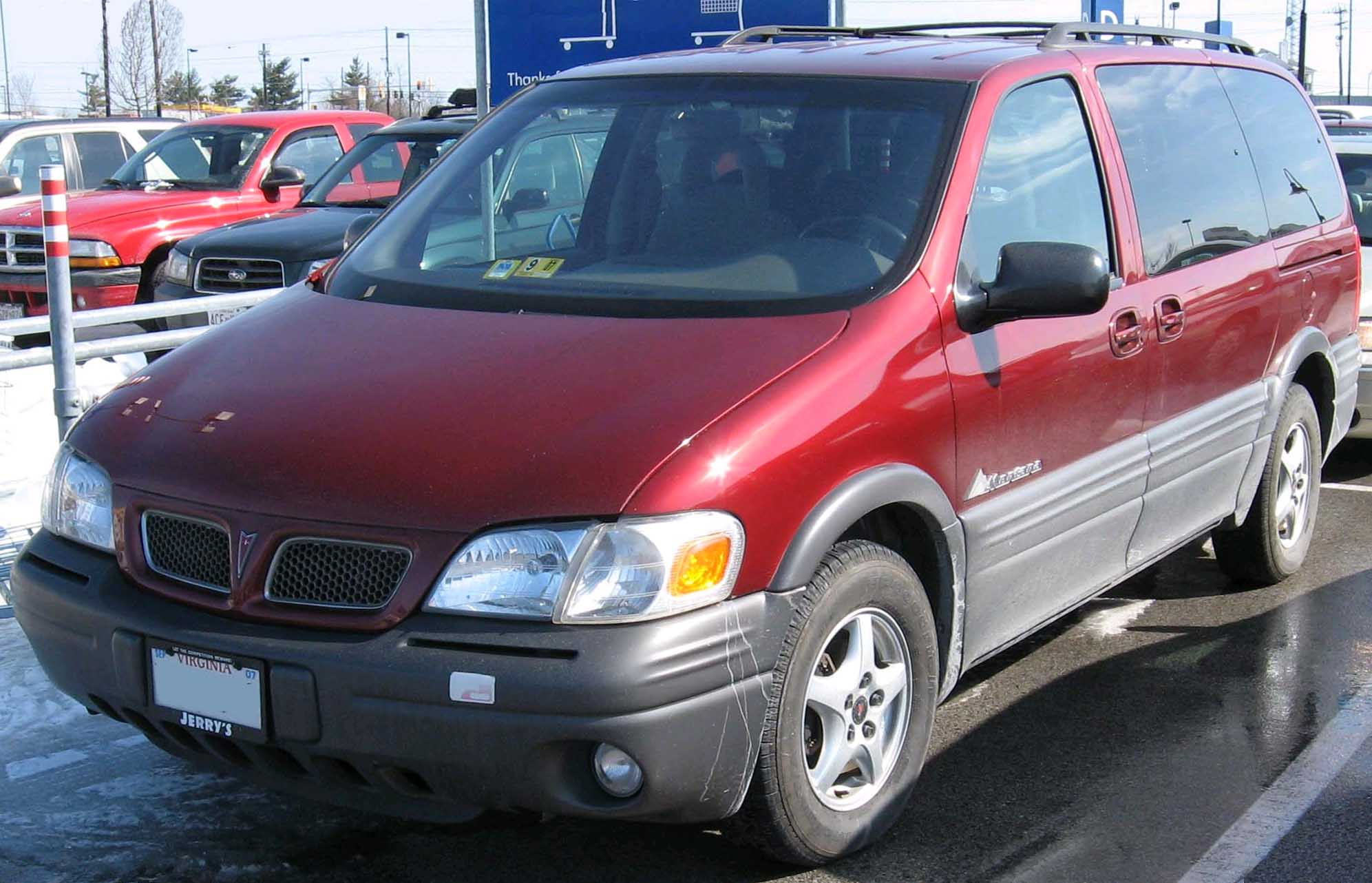
The gray plastic cladding of a Pontiac Montana contrasts with the red body panels

Material (usually plastic) added to exterior of the car which isn't structurally necessary. May be functional to keep out dirt/debris as in underbody cladding, or may be cosmetic.

Control panel

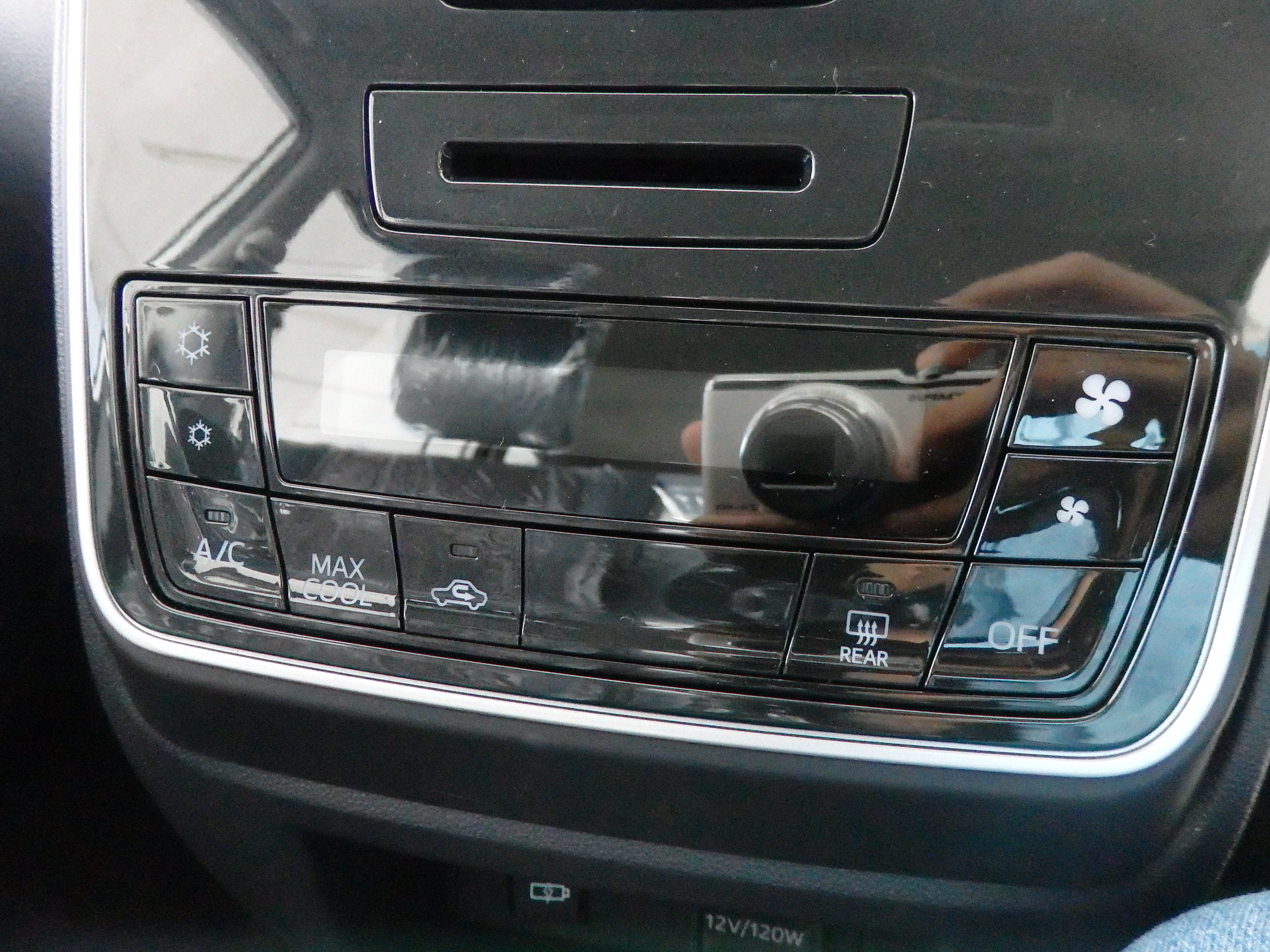
Control panel for HVAC functions in a Toyota Avanza

Generally used in a car or truck for heating and cooling inside car environment according to the passenger requirements. Basically it is divided into different modes, blower speed functions, AC, temperature, and fresh recirculation of air. Worldwide control panel manufacturers are BHTC, Delphi, Visteon, Valeo, etc.

Cowl

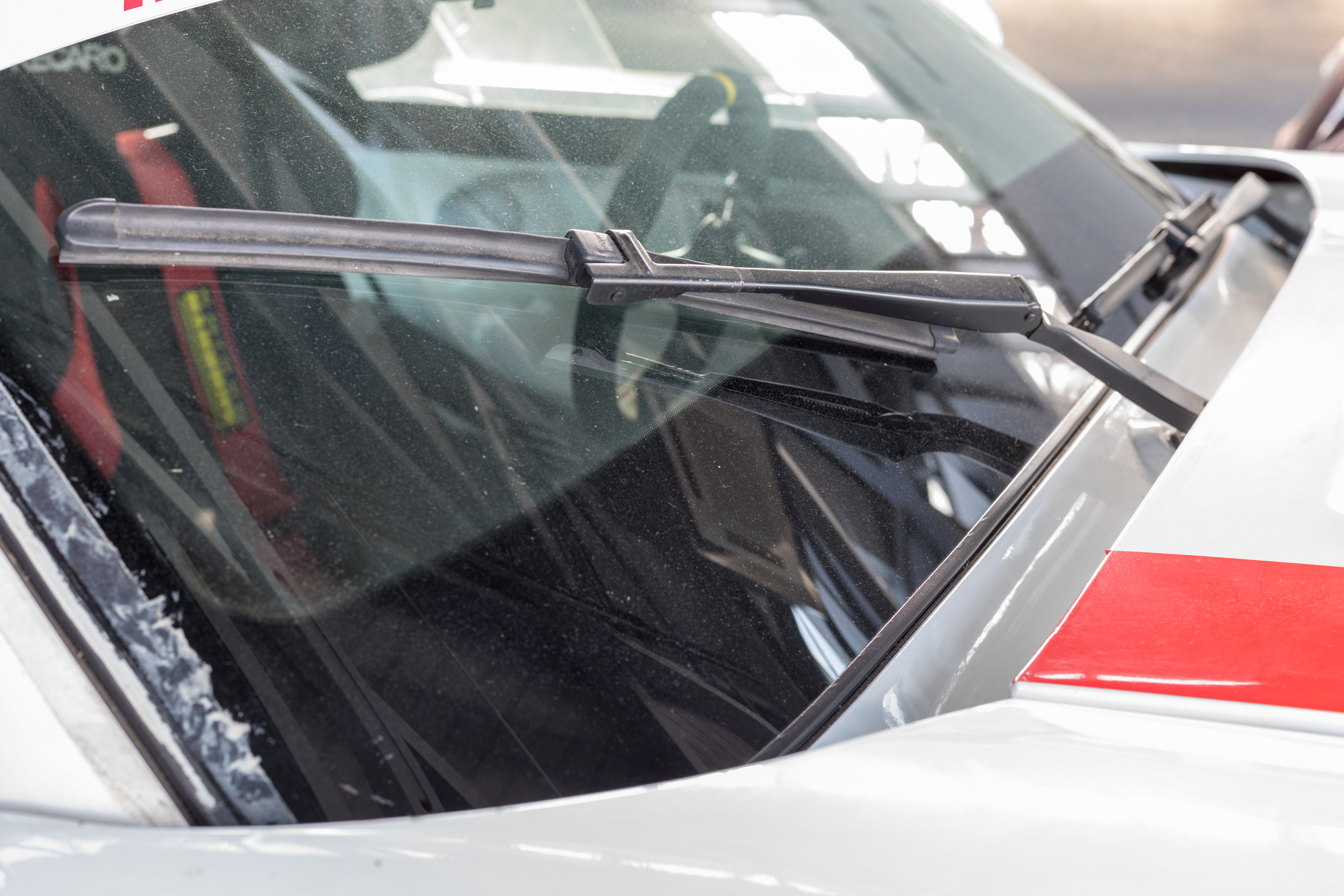
The cowl of this Wiesmann GT includes two openings for the wiper motors

The base of the windshield.

== D ==
Dagmar bumpers

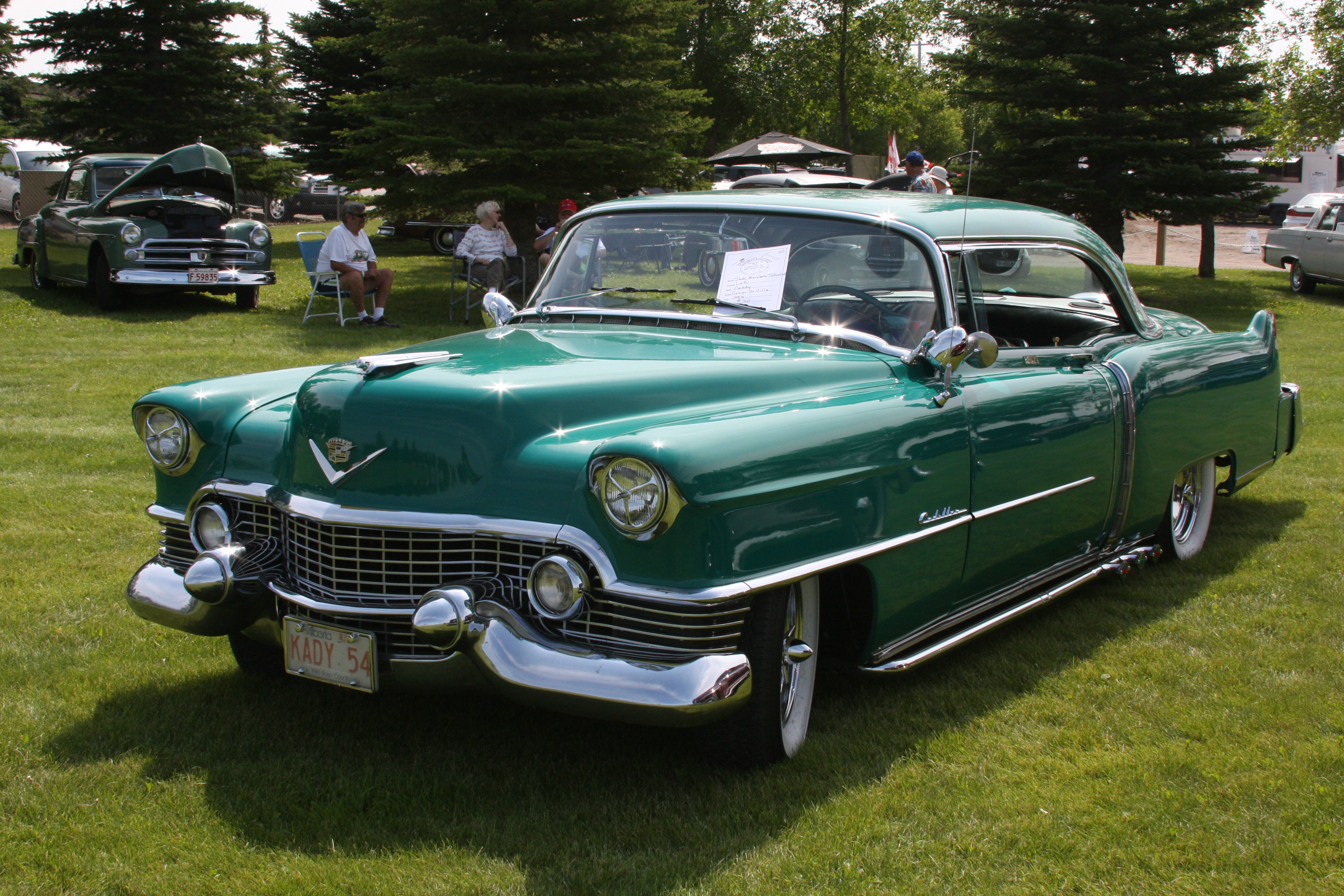
1954 Cadillac Coupe DeVille featuring prominent bullet-shaped Dagmar bumpers

A slang term for chrome conical shaped styling elements which began to appear on the front bumper/grille assemblies of certain American automobiles following World War II. The term is derived from the notable physical attributes of Dagmar, a buxom early 1950s television personality known for low-cut gowns and pronouncedly conical bra cups.

Daylight Opening (DLO)
refers to the window openings in the § Greenhouse of a vehicle
US DOT Term: For openings on the side of the vehicle, other than a door opening, the locus of all points where a horizontal line, perpendicular to the vehicle longitudinal centerline, is tangent to the periphery of the opening.
US DOT Term: For openings on the front and rear of the vehicle, other than a door opening, daylight opening means the locus of all points where a horizontal line, parallel to the vehicle longitudinal centerline is tangent to the periphery of the opening.
Daytime Running Lamp (DRL)

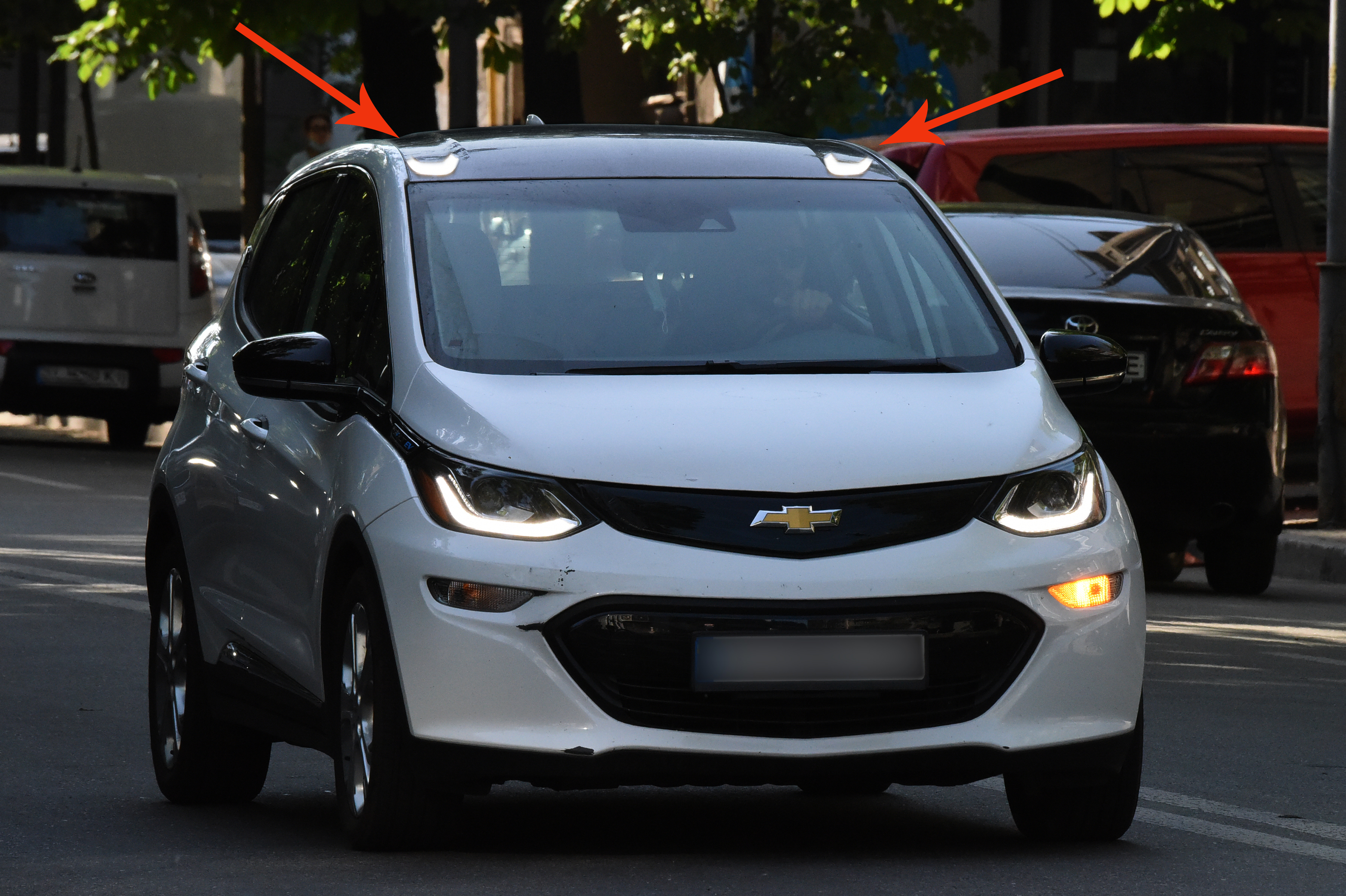
U-shaped daytime running lamps of a Chevrolet Bolt EV

A daytime running lamp (DRL, also daytime running light) is an automotive lighting and bicycle lighting device on the front of a roadgoing motor vehicle or bicycle,[1] automatically switched on when the vehicle is in drive, emitting white, yellow, or amber light. Their job isn't to help the driver see the road but to help other road users see the vehicle.

Dash-to-Axle (ratio)

Dash-to-axle ratios of a Mini and Lincoln Continental presidential limousine

The critical relationship between front wheel centers and the windshield base. The most notable differences can be seen between cars with front-engine, front-wheel drive layout and front mid-engine, rear-wheel drive layout: the former tend to have longer front overhangs with a smaller dash-to-axle ratios, while the latter have shorter front overhangs with much greater dash-to-axle. Most so called premium vehicles (equipped with rear wheel drive) feature a relatively long dash-to-axle ratio.

Deck
The horizontal surface at the rear of the car, which usually serves as the trunk lid.
Dog leg

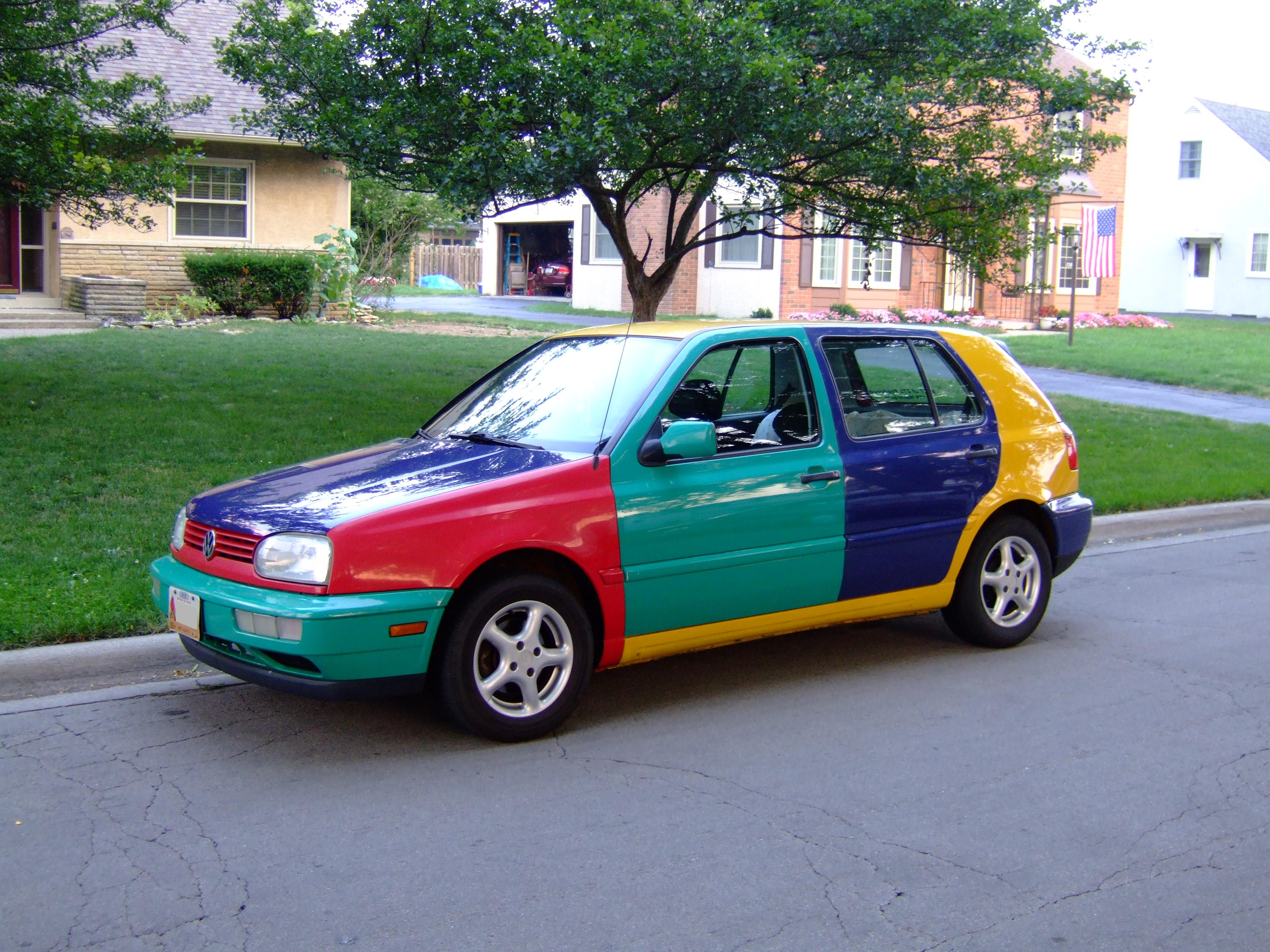
The Volkswagen Golf Harlequin features multi-color body panels; in this example, the dog leg is yellow, extending from the rocker to the roof

The area behind the rear door on a four-door car. This area is part of the quarter panel just behind the door and in front of the rear wheel house.

Down the Road Graphics (DRG)
The styling of the front end of the car, which people will instantly recognize and associate with a manufacturer. For example, the grille, lights and sometimes the DLO.
Droptop
A convertible

== F ==
Fairing

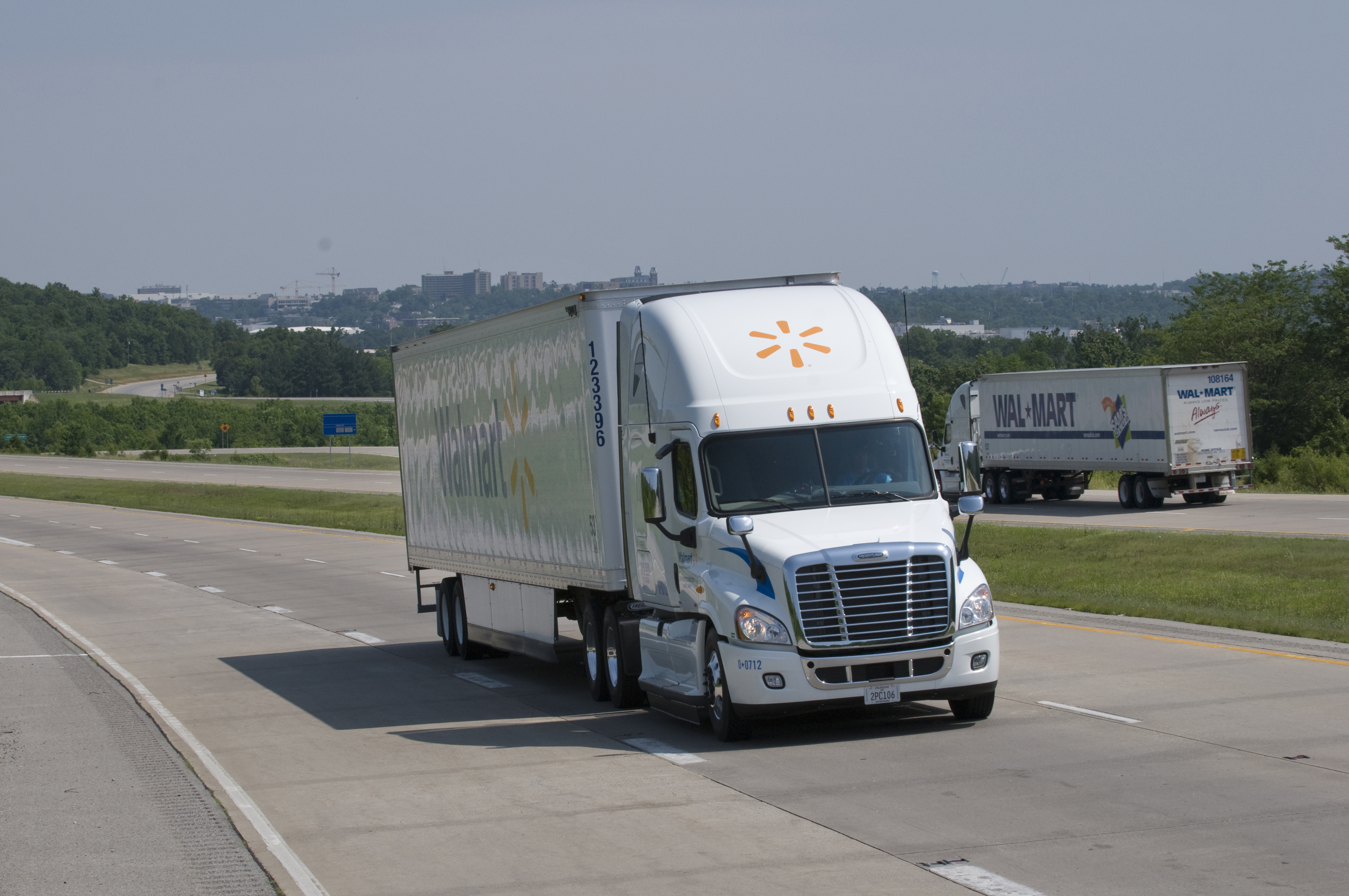
Many semi-trailer trucks have a fairing mounted on the roof of the cab to improve aerodynamics

An external structure added to increase streamlining, deflect wind, and reduce drag.

Fascia
The body-skin panel at the front of the car.
Fastback

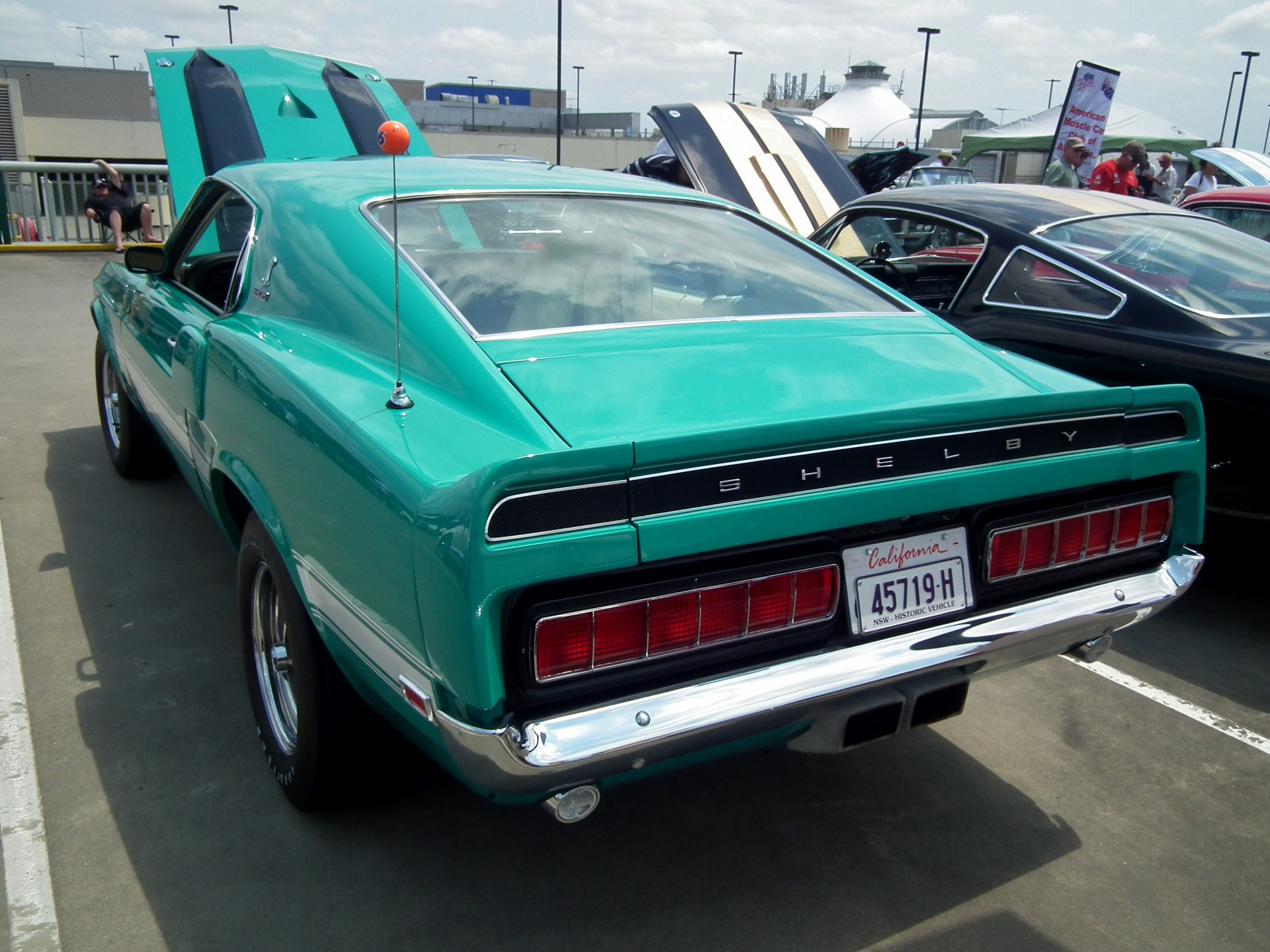
Shelby Mustang GT350 fastback

A car body style whose roofline slopes continuously down at the back found on cars with a single convex curve from the top to the rear bumper.

Fender (wings, UK)

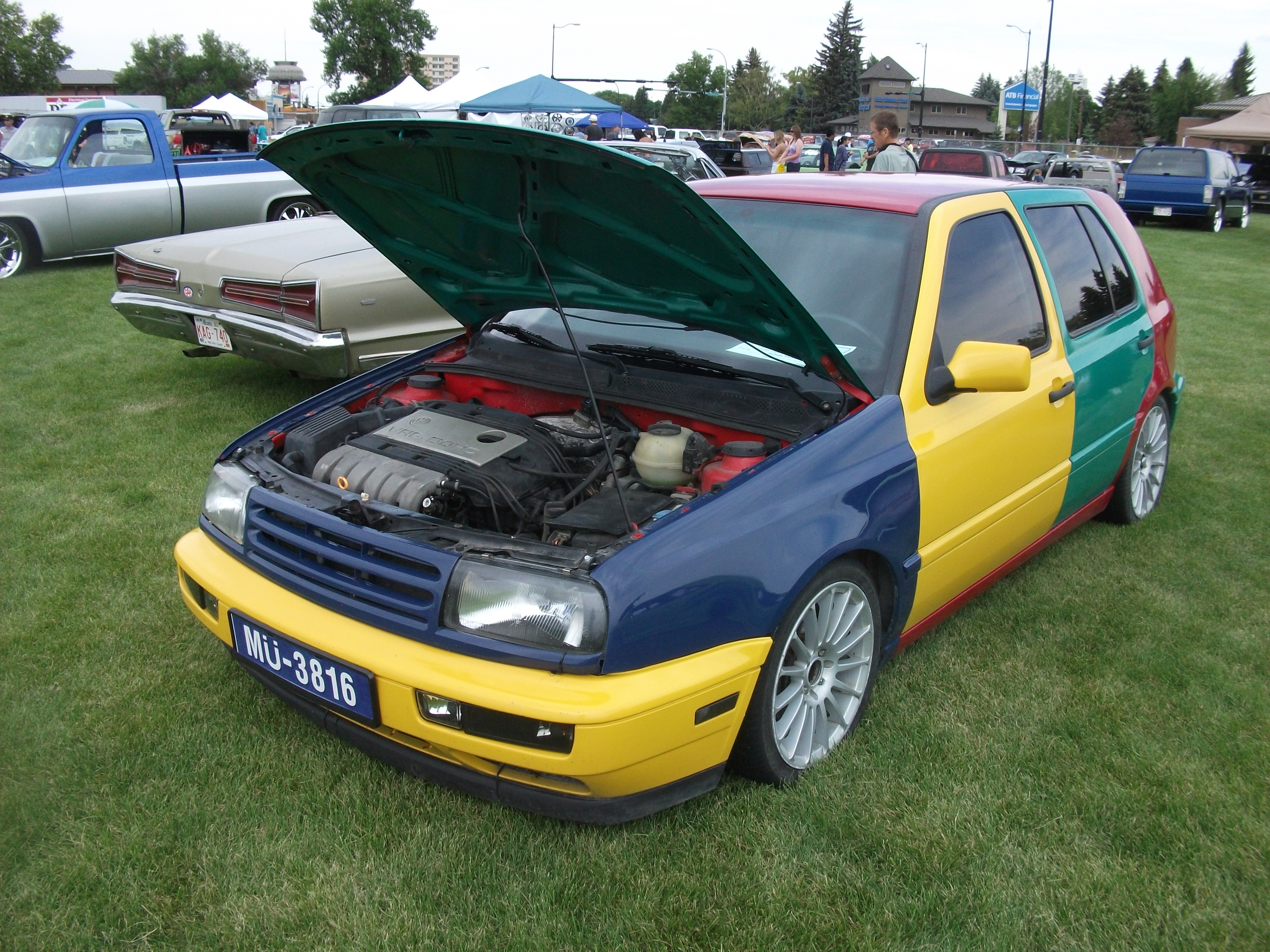
On this Volkswagen Golf Harlequin, the fender or wings are colored blue

Term for cowl covering the wheels of the vehicles. In more modern automobiles, this refers generally to the body panel or panels starting at the front "bumper" to the first door line excluding the engine hood. The opposite of the fender is the "quarter panel".

Fishtail Exhaust

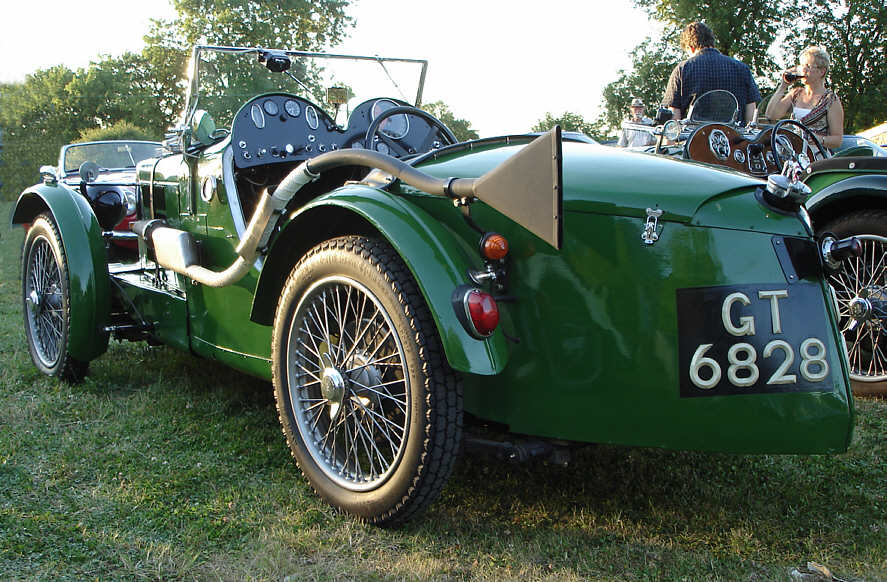
The MG C-type was fitted with a fishtail exhaust

An exhaust tip that widens into an elongated opening, resembling the tail of a fish, also seen on motorcycles and aircraft. In 1925 the Brooklands race track mandated the use of expansion boxes and fishtails as a measure against noise.

Frame-on-rail

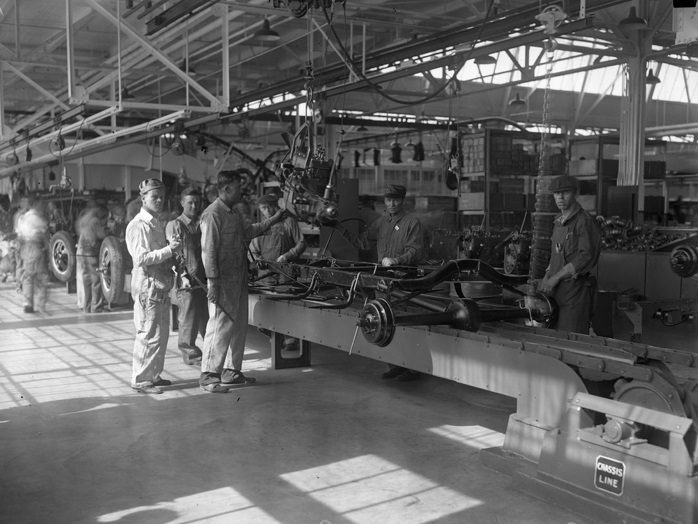
Workers fit an engine with transmission to the frame at the Ford Long Beach Assembly plant

Also known as body-on-frame. A design used in older (pre-unibody) cars, trucks, and SUVs. The power train and body are mounted to a rigid structural vehicle frame, also known as a rail, and the body is a distinct structure that is mounted to the frame. In some cases, the distinction between a body-on-frame and unibody construction are blurred; for example, subframes could be used to carry suspension components, or the body could be a separate module, such as the case of the BMW i3.

== G ==
Gill

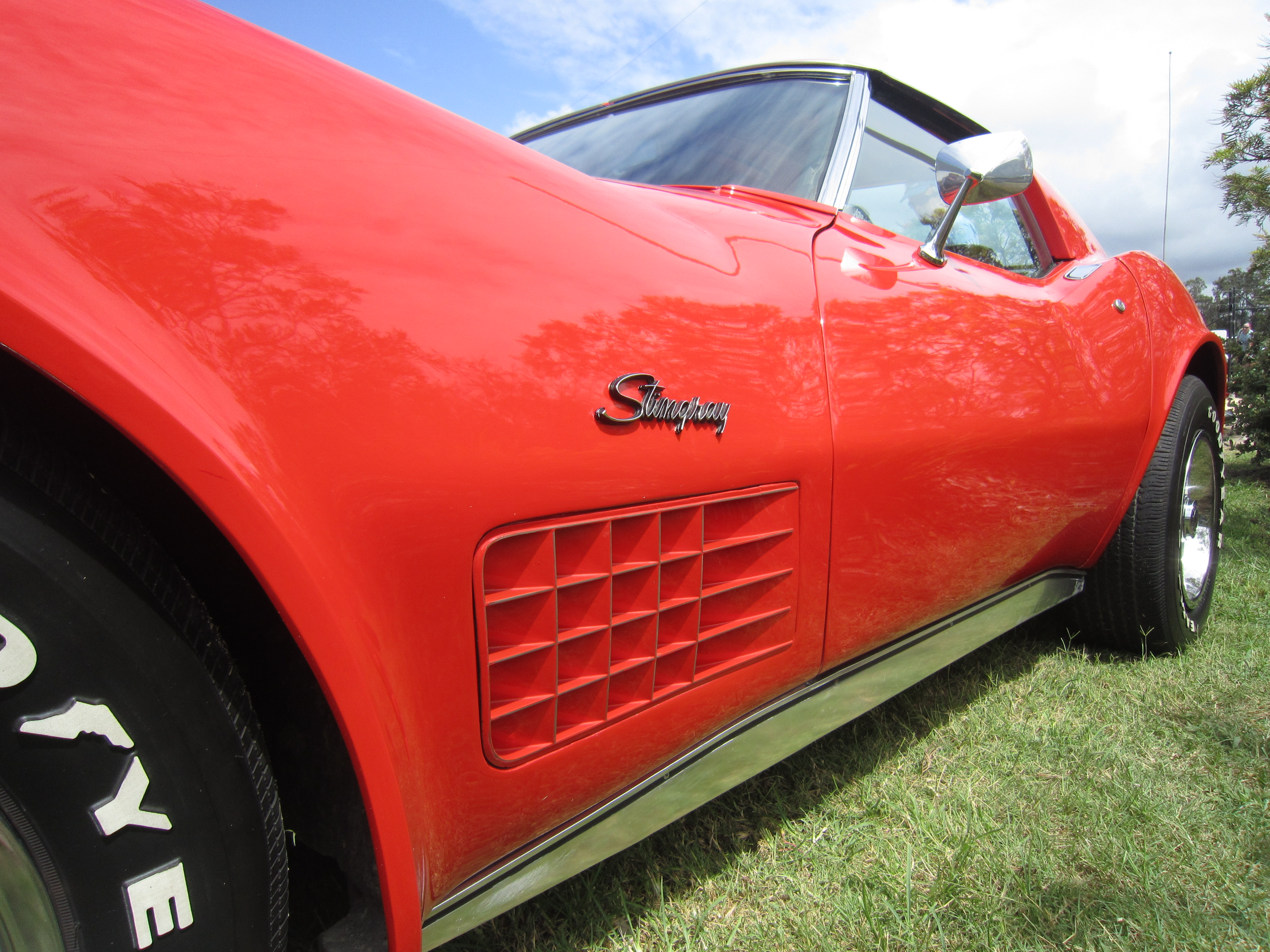
Decorative gill on Chevrolet Corvette (C3)

A vent on the side of the fender that can be used as hot-air outlet, but usually decorative.

Greenhouse
The glassed-in upper section of the car's body. Daylight Opening (DLO) in turn describes the actual window areas only.
Gull-wing door

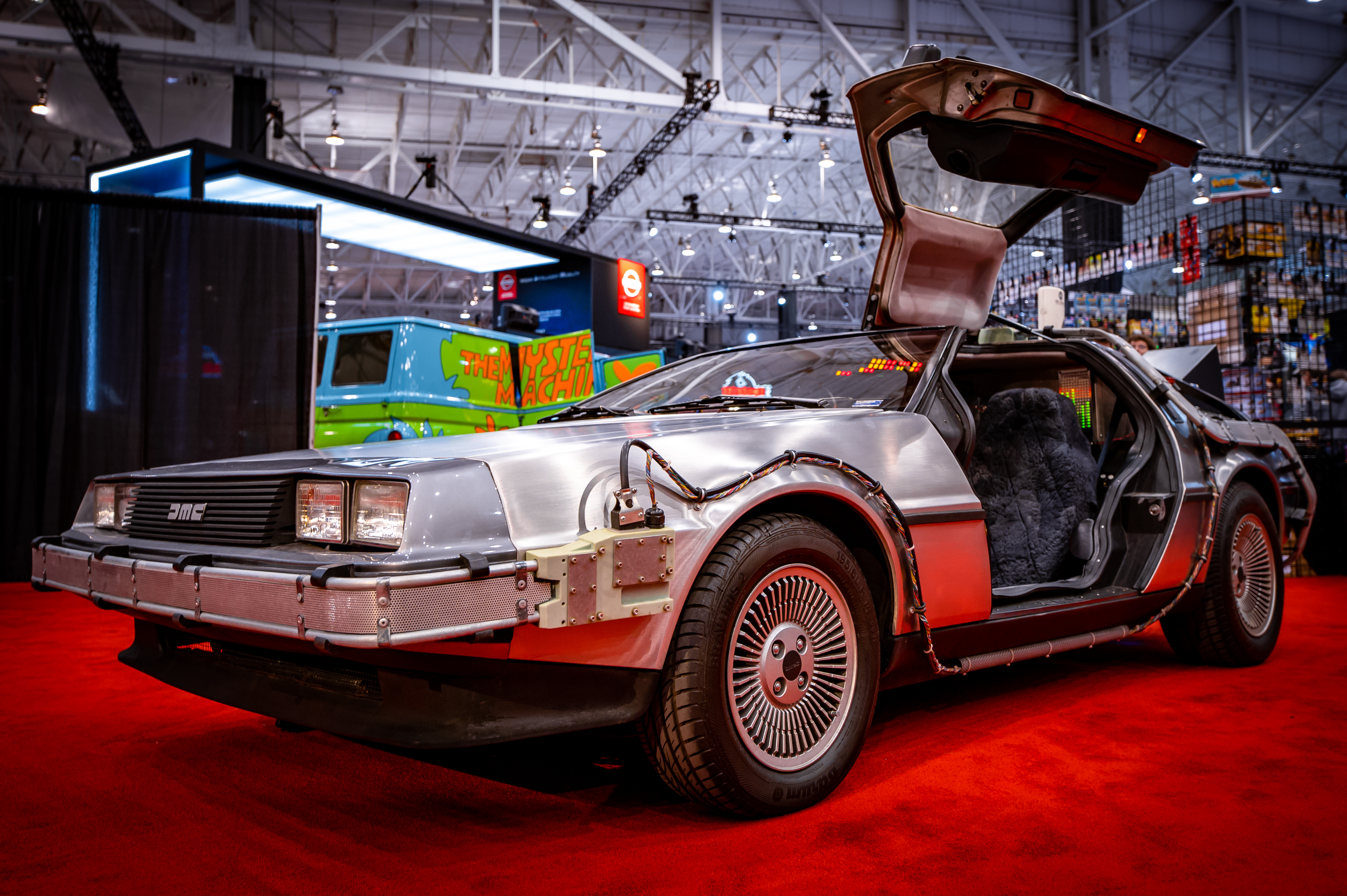
One gull-wing door is open on this DMC DeLorean, modified as a replica of the time machine from the Back to the Future films

Car doors that are hinged at the roof rather than the side, as pioneered by the 1952 Mercedes-Benz 300SL race car. Opening upwards, the doors evoke the image of a seagull's wings.

== H ==
Hardtop

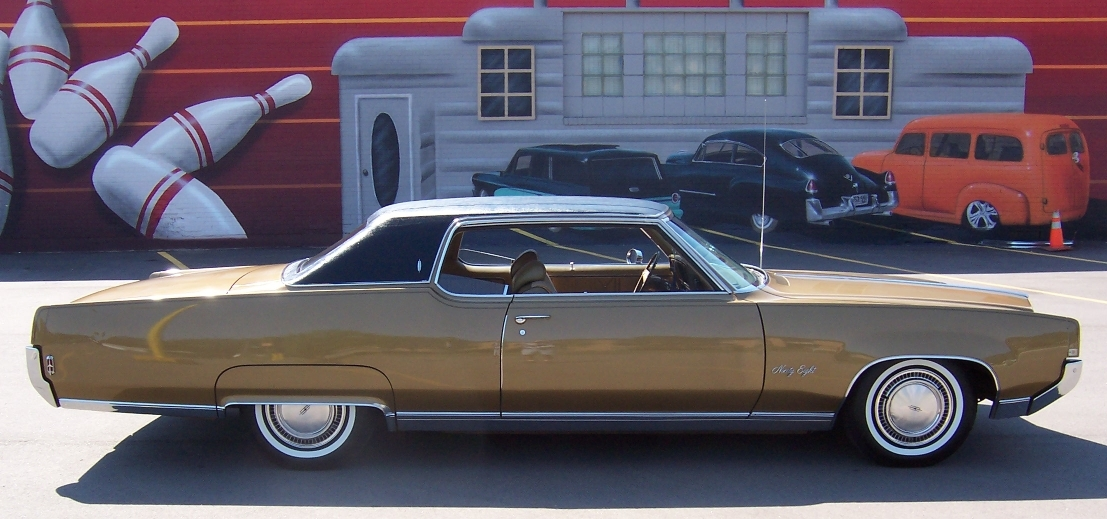
Oldsmobile Ninety-Eight hardtop coupe

A coupe or sedan lacking a center window post between the front windshield post and the rearmost window post or body section.

Header
The structural roof beam above the windshield. Alternatively, header can refer to the section of exhaust piping attached to the cylinder head.
Hofmeister kink

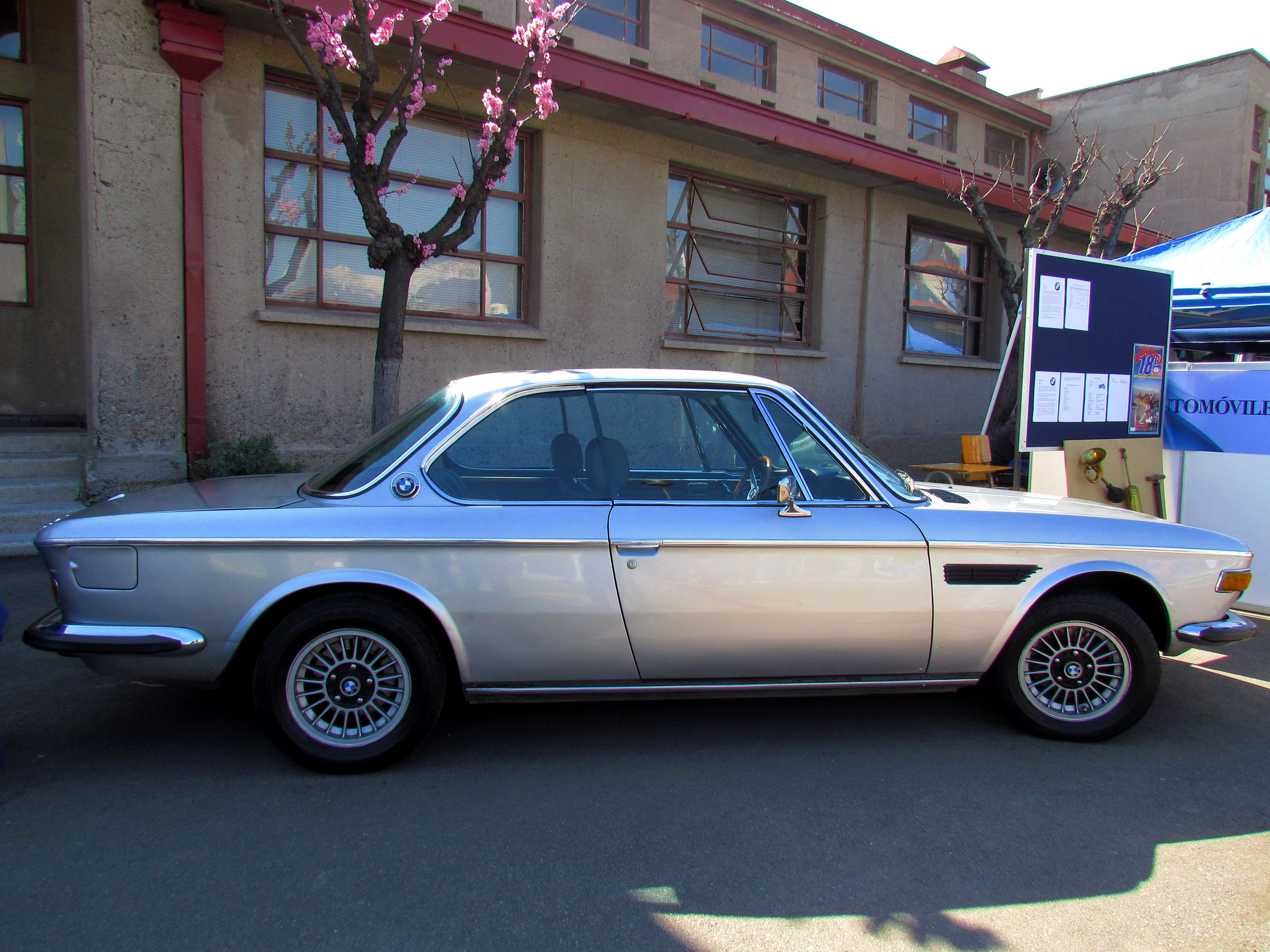
The Hofmeister kink at the base of the C-pillar of this BMW 3.0 CS is adorned with a BMW roundel

BMW's trademark reverse-sweep kick at the bottom of last roof pillar.
H-point (or HP (Hip Point))
The pivot point between the torso and upper leg portions of the body, either relative to the floor of the vehicle[1] or relative to the height above pavement level, as used in vehicle design.
Hood
The engine cover on vehicles when the engine is located forward or aft of the passenger compartment. Also known as a bonnet in English speaking countries outside North America with the exception of the Canadian Maritimes
HVAC
Heater, ventilation and air condition. A major package constraint both technically as well in interior design.

== I ==
IP

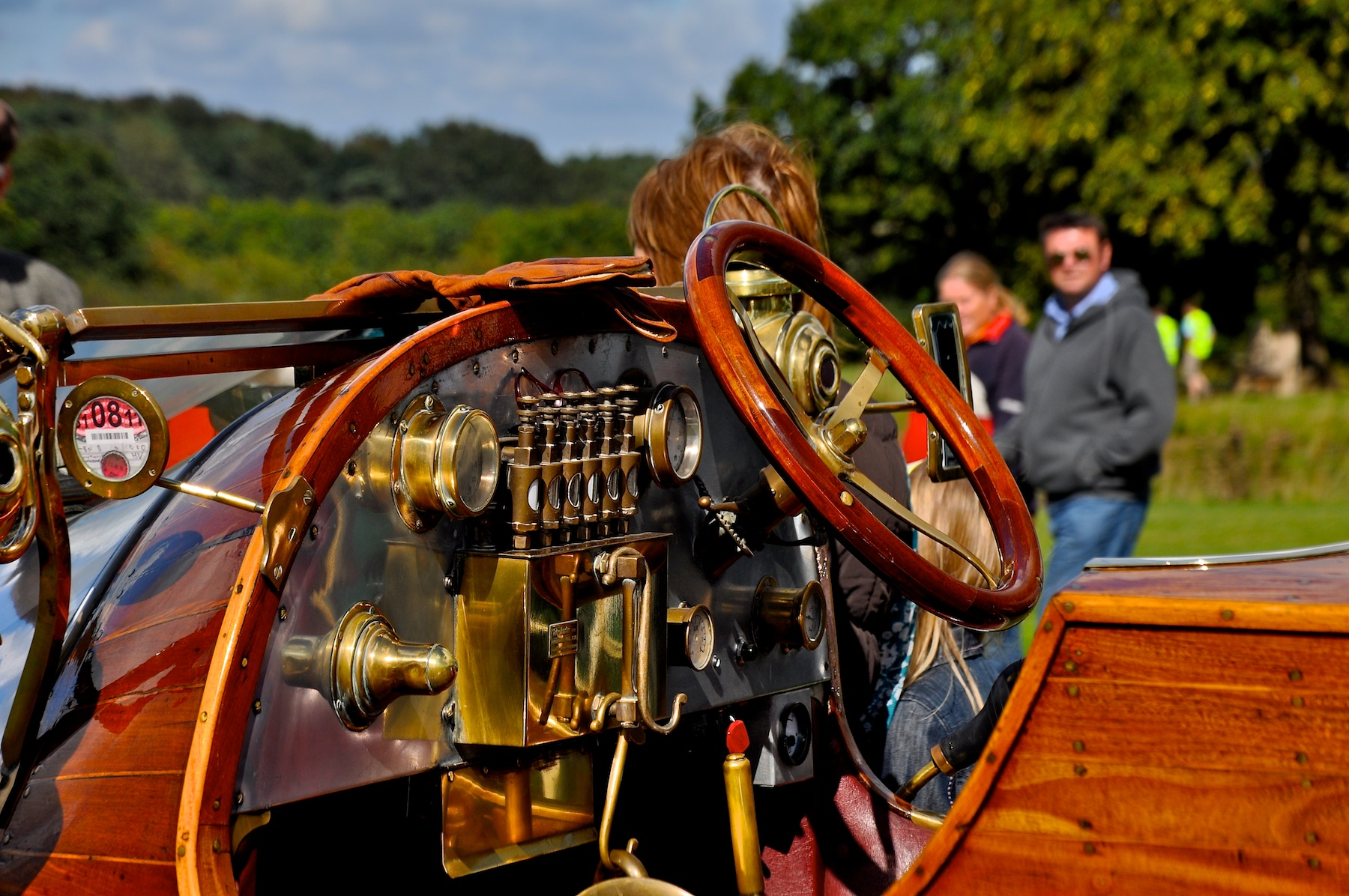
The instrument panel of Chitty Chitty Bang Bang, used in the film of the same name

Instrument Panel. The dashboard is termed the instrument panel in the automotive industry. Sometimes this term is confused with the instrument cluster, the group of speedometer, odometer and similar devices generally behind the steering wheel.

== K ==
Kammback

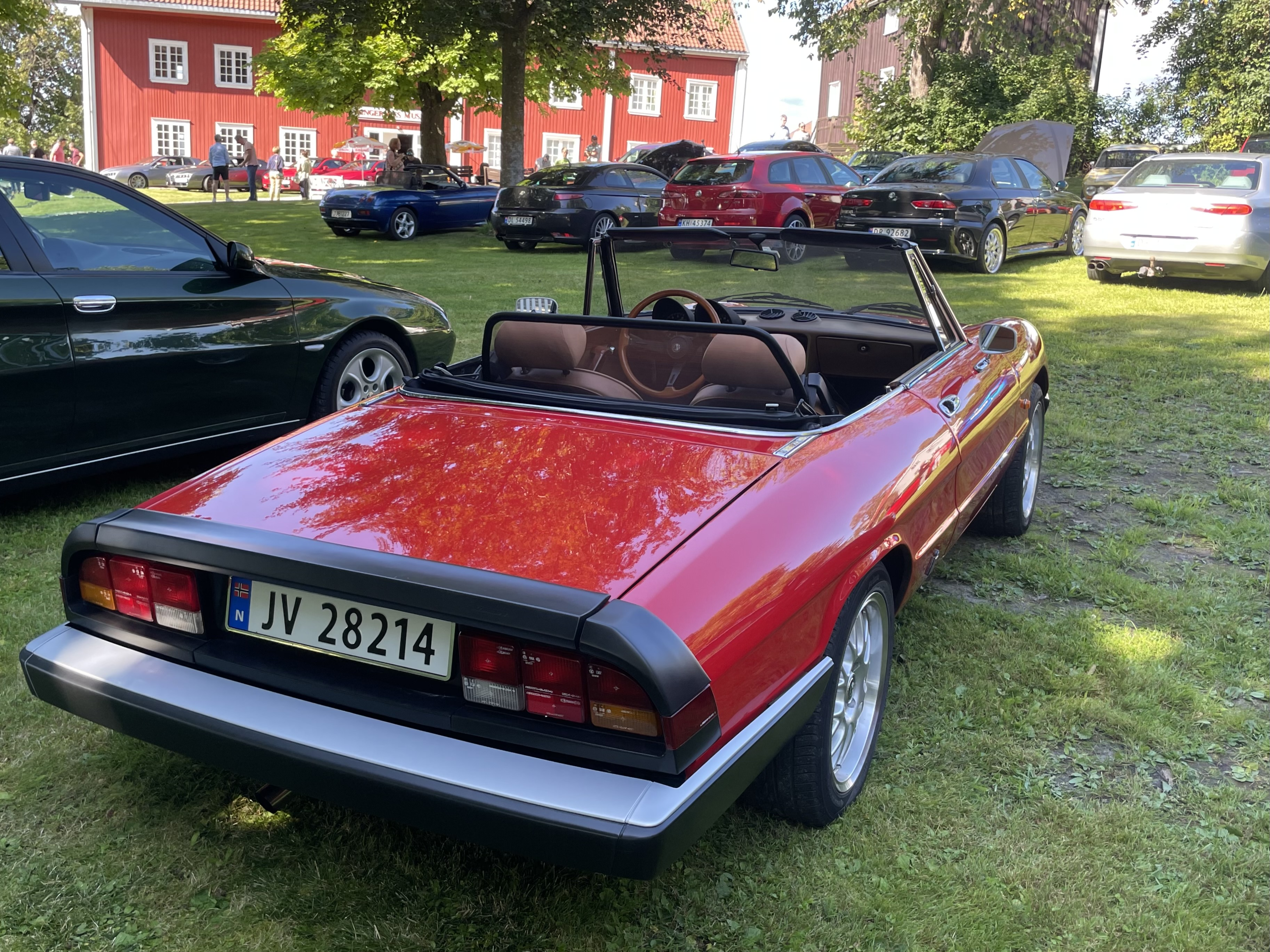
The styling update to the Alfa Romeo Spider in 1970 gave it a Kammback tail

A car body style that calls for a body with smooth contours that continues to a tail that is abruptly cut.

== L ==
Leafscreen
Plastic clips onto the base of the windscreen under the bonnet to protect from leaves and flowers.
Leafscreen retainer
Bonded to the base of the windscreen to provide a mounting surface for the leafscreen

== N ==
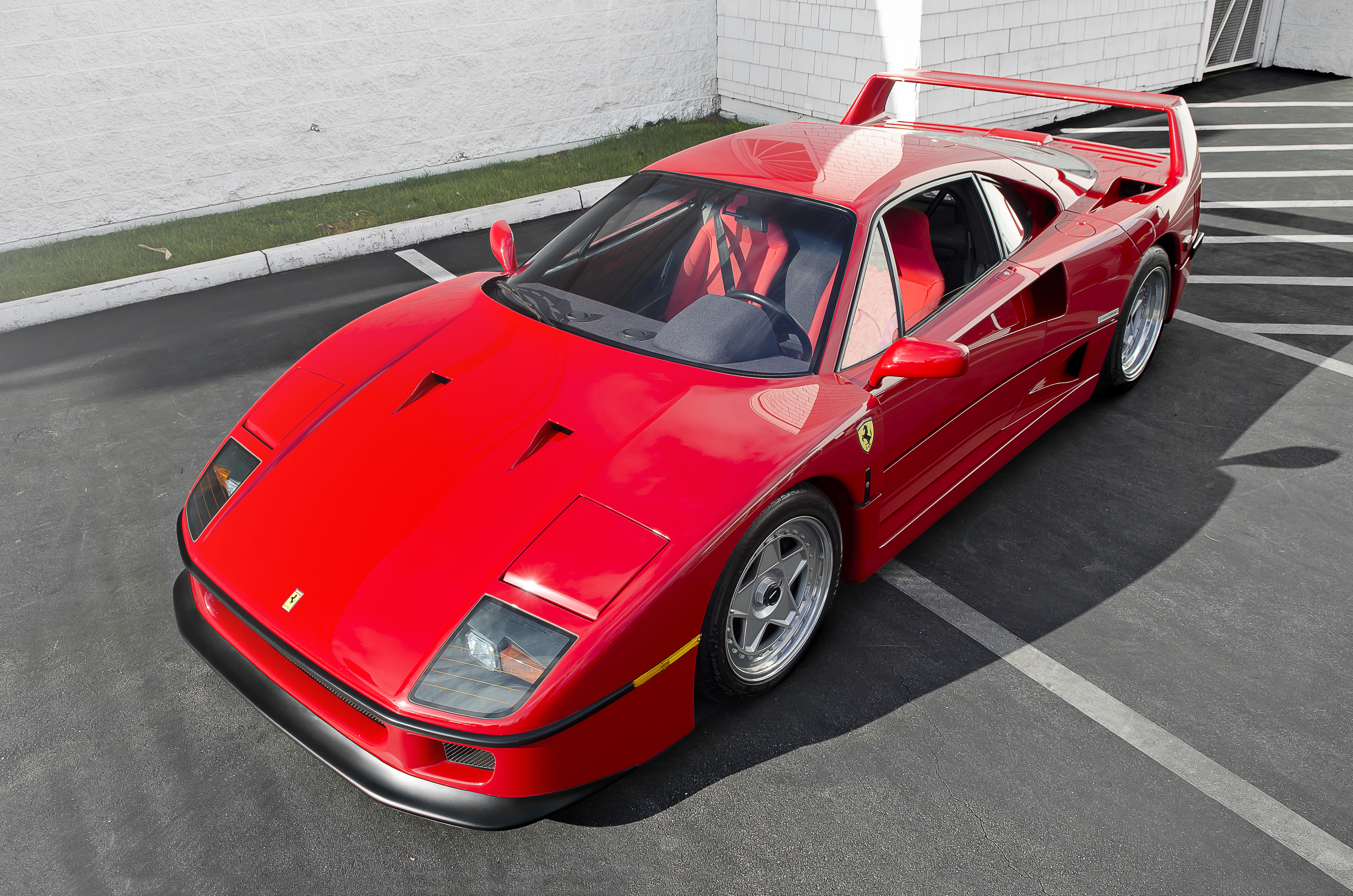
The Ferrari F40 features multiple NACA ducts at the front, rear, and sides

NACA duct
A distinctively shaped inlet that is flush and begins with a narrow, shallow inset and becomes progressively wider and deeper. The duct was developed to introduce cooling air into aircraft engine nacelles, while increasing the drag of the nacelle only minimally. The duct was developed at the National Advisory Committee for Aeronautics (NACA).

== O ==
Overhang

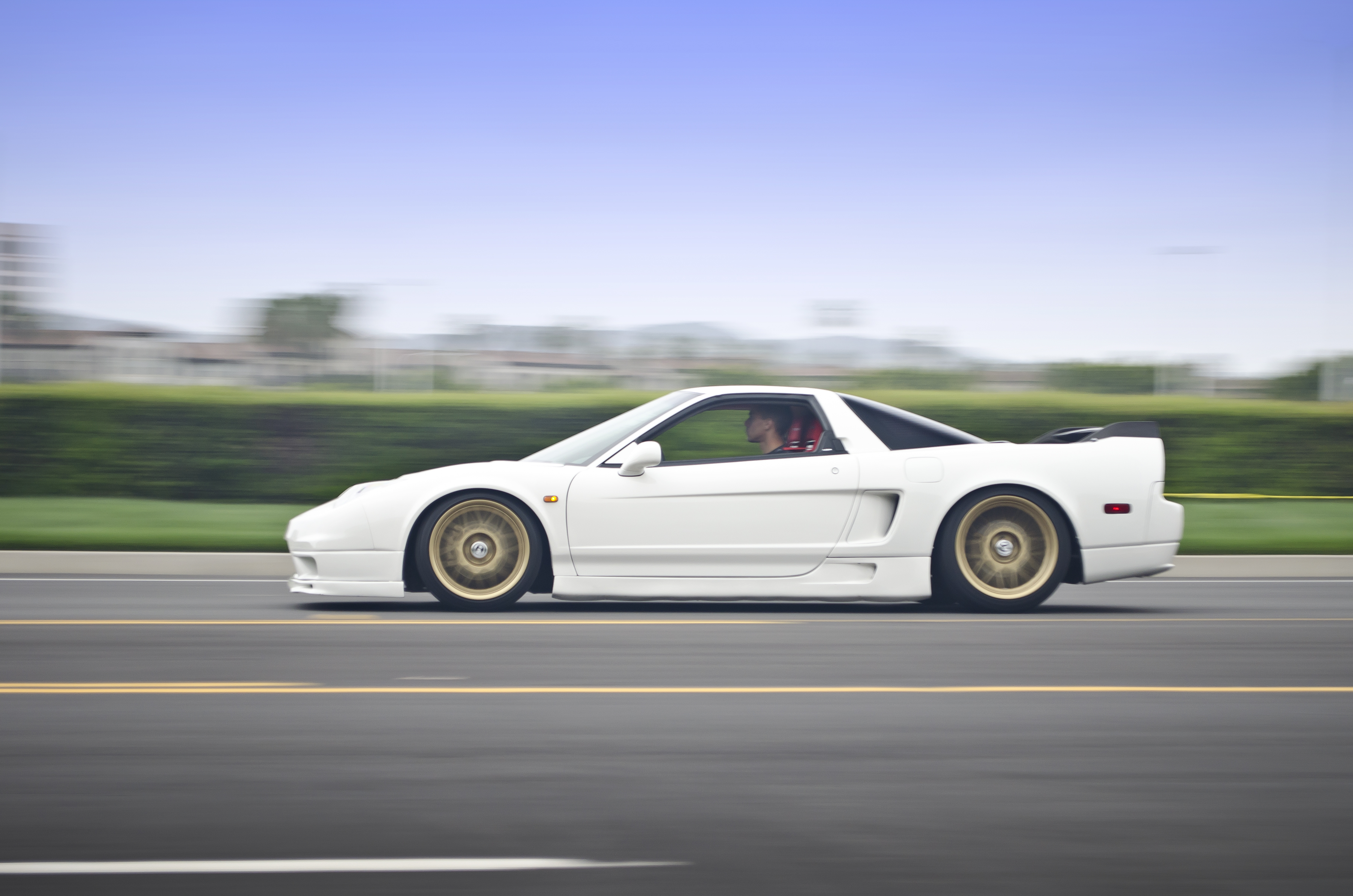
The front and rear overhangs of the Acura NSX refer to the body forward of the front wheels and aft of the rear wheels, respectively; OHR = 42.6%

The distance the car's body extends beyond the wheelbase at the front (front overhang) and rear (rear overhang). In car style design terms, this is the amount of body that is beyond the wheels or wheel arches. In general, the sum of the front and rear overhangs is equal to the overall length minus the wheelbase. Typically, the rear overhang is larger on rear-wheel drive cars, while the front overhang is larger on front-wheel drive cars. Journalist Paul Niedermeyer has proposed an overhang ratio, computed as $OHR = \frac{\left ( length - wheelbase \right )}{length}$.

Obscuration band

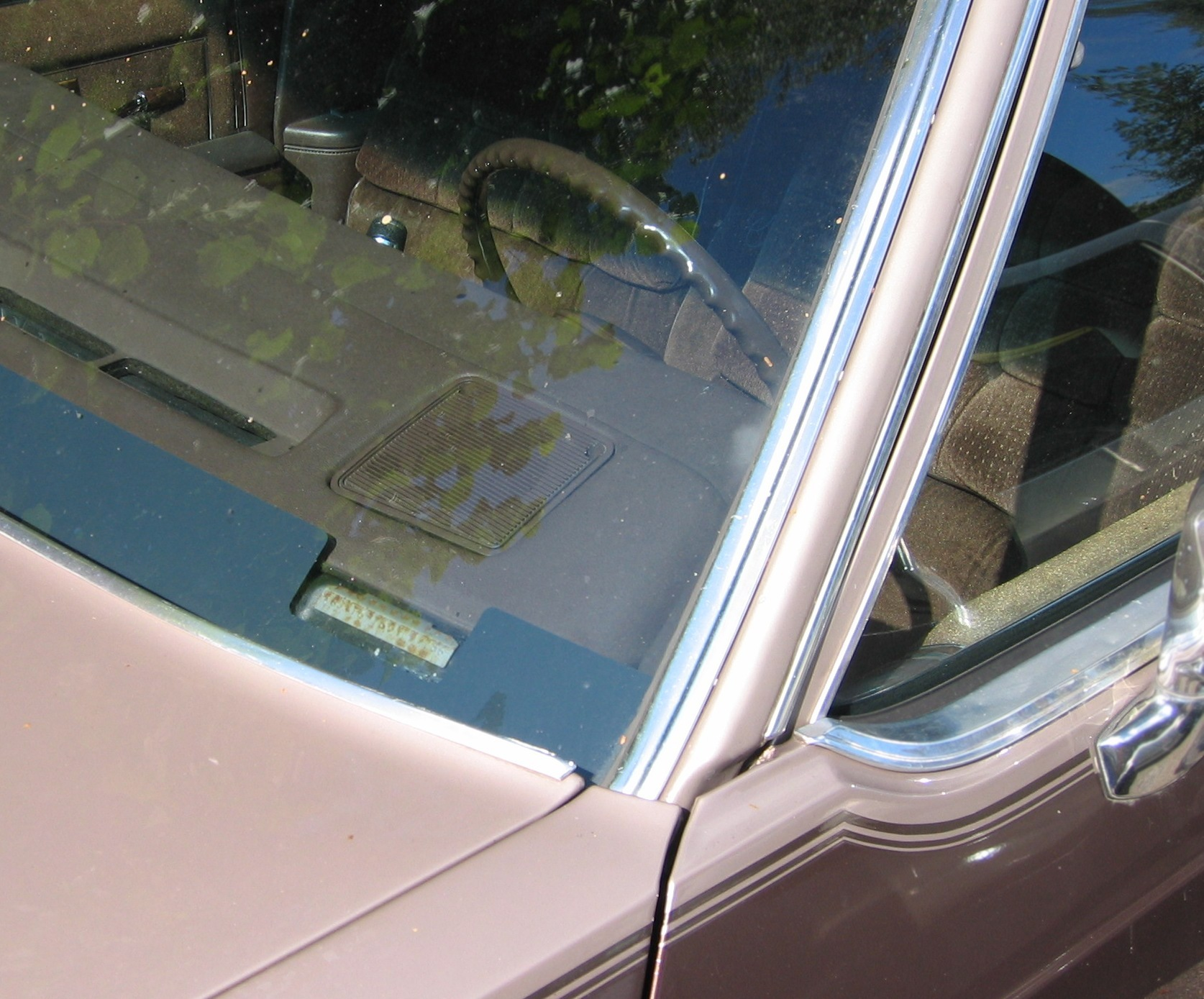
The obscuration band at the base of this windshield has a notch to display the vehicle identification number

Black graphite printed onto the glass to hide unsightly areas and improve aesthetics.

== P ==
Phaeton

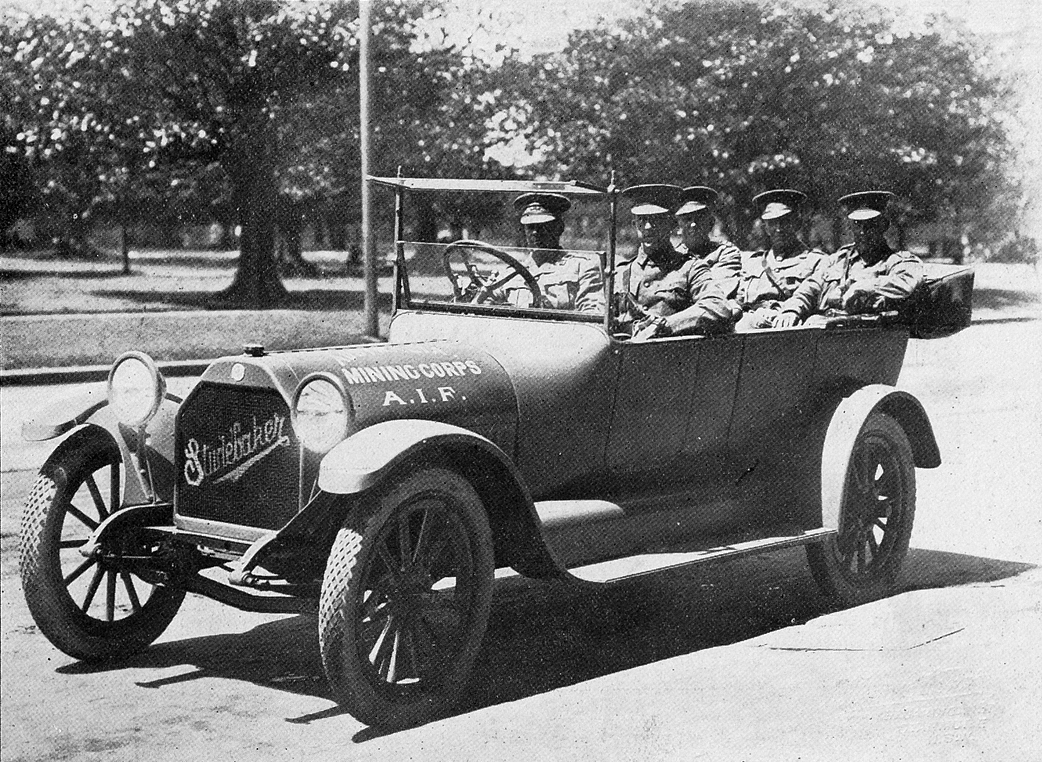
1916 Studebaker phaeton

An open vehicle, usually with 4 doors, with a removable and/or retractable cloth top and a windshield characterized by the lack of integrated glass side windows. Contemporary uses of this name do not always follow this original description or apply to an open vehicle.

Pillar

Labeled pillars

A structural member that connects the roof to the body of the car. Pillars are usually notated from front to back alphabetically (e.g. the A-pillar joins the windshield to the frontmost side windows, the B-pillar is next to the front occupants' heads, etc.).

The angle of the A-pillar and the § dash-to-axle are related. An imaginary line extending from the base of the A-pillar and following its angle will pass in front of the front axle for most front-wheel drive and mid-engined cars, while it will pass through or behind the front axle for most rear-wheel drive cars. Pulling the A-pillar forward increases cabin volume, but the car will tend to assume a § one box shape and the A-pillar position may interfere with the driver's vision.

The C-pillar usually is the last structural pillar in most § three box forms. Its angle and position defines the split between cargo volume and rear-seat passenger volume and headroom. In general, the base of the C-pillar is located over the rear wheel arch in most sedans (saloons) and coupes.

US DOT Term: Means any structure, excluding glazing and the vertical portion of door window frames, but including accompanying molding, attached components such as safety belt anchorages and coat hooks, that (1) supports either a roof or any other structure (such as a roll-bar) above the driver's head or (2) is located along a side edge of a window.
Plenum

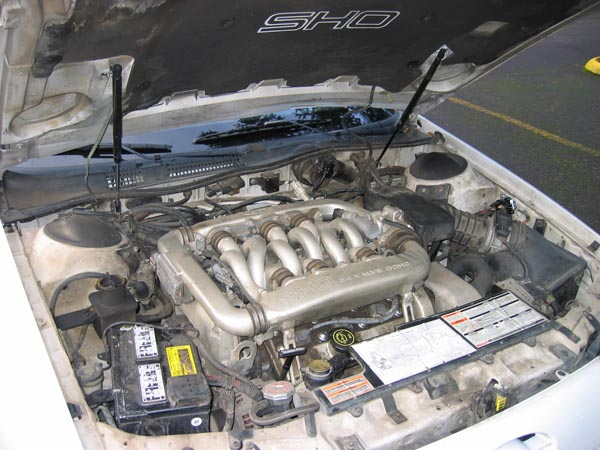
Ford Taurus SHO, showing the windshield wiper plenum at the base of the windshield and the serpentine intake manifold of the Yamaha-designed V6 engine

The area at the base of the windshield where the wipers are parked. Also refers to the main chamber in an intake manifold.

Ponton styling

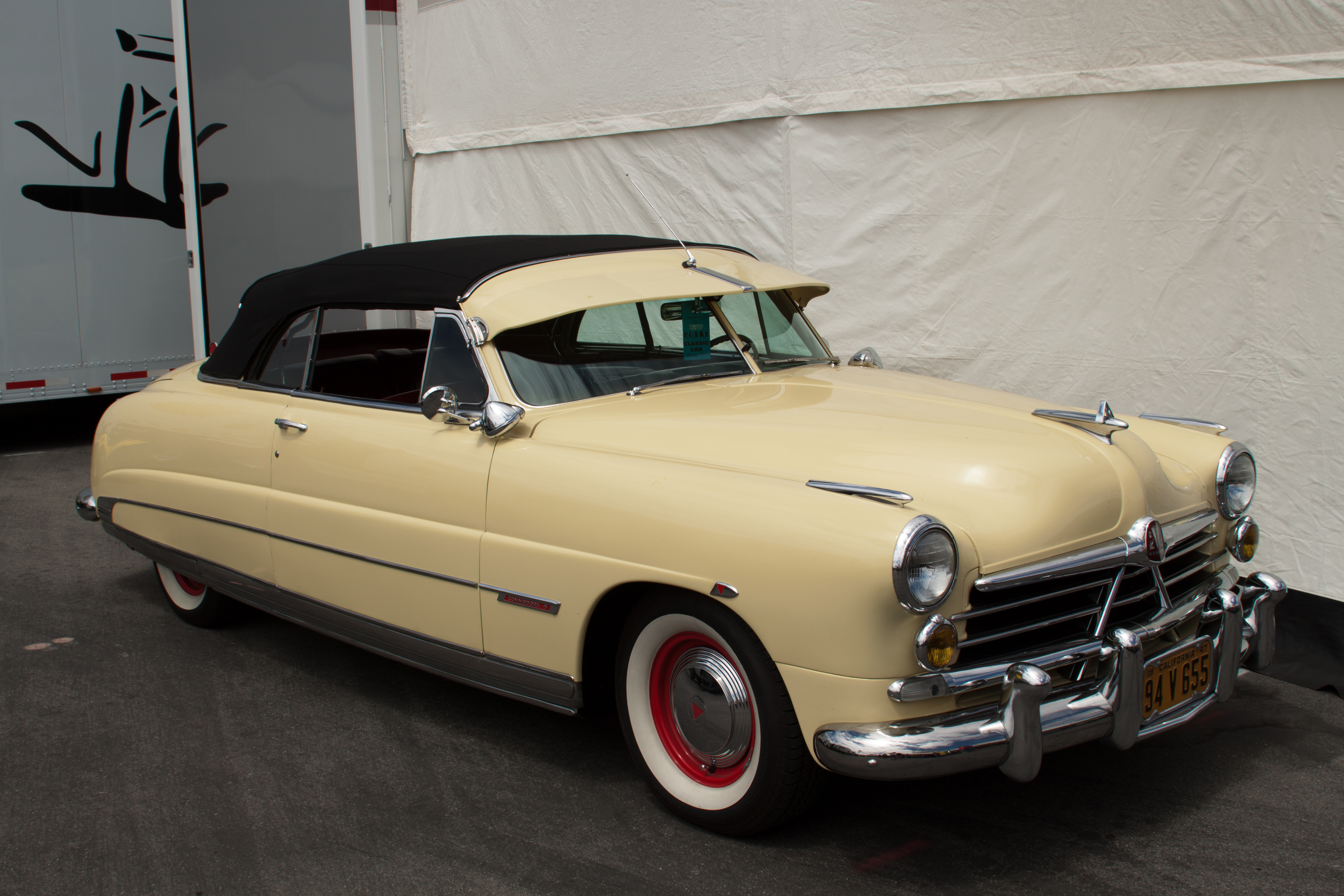
Like many manufacturers, Hudson adopted ponton styling for its postwar models. The front and rear fenders of this 1950 Commodore form an uninterrupted surface along the side of the car.

A 1930s–1960s design genre when distinct running boards and fully articulated fenders became less common and bodywork began to enclose the full width and uninterrupted length of a car in a markedly bulbous, slab-sided fashion.

Plug-in hybrid electric vehicle

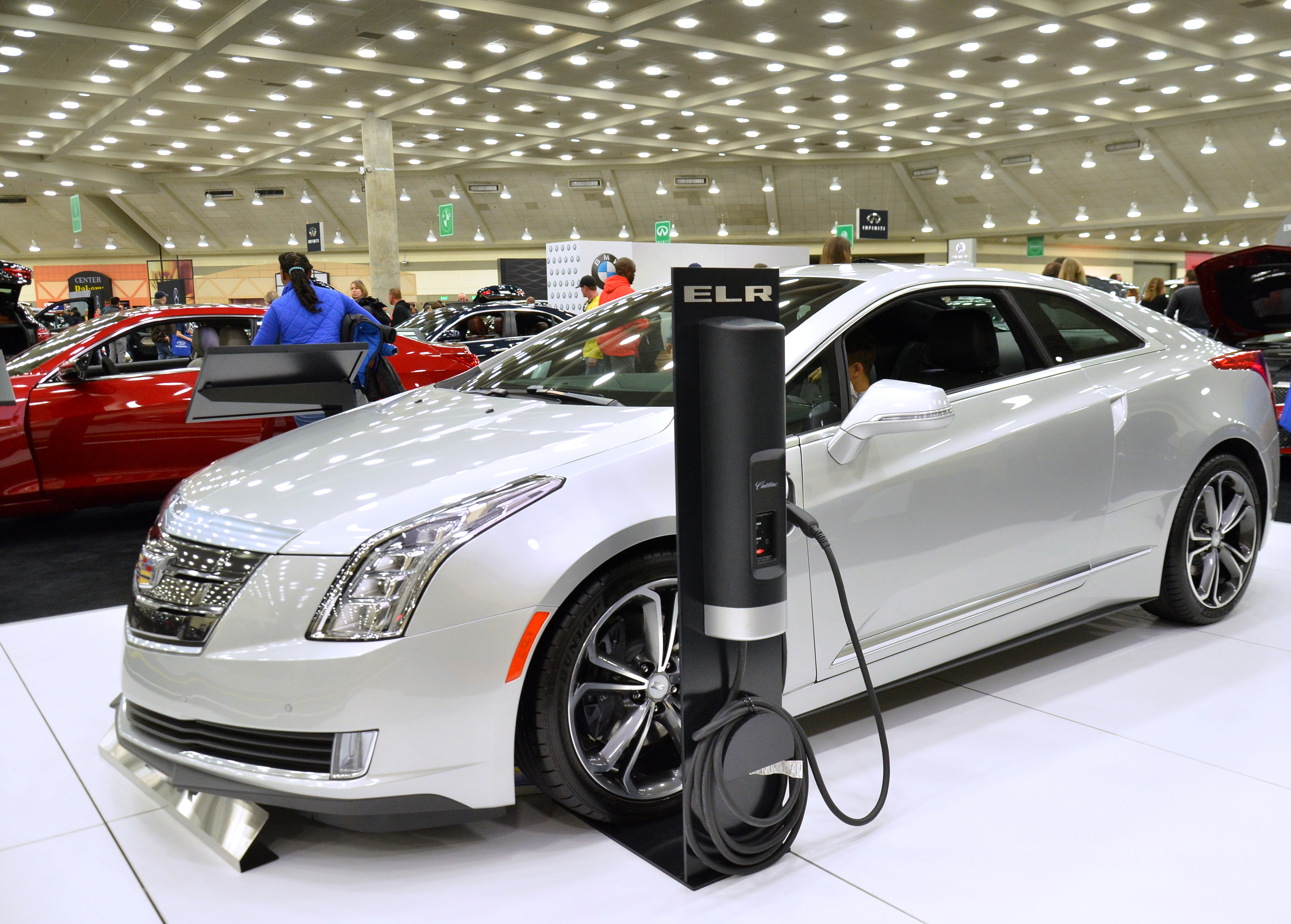
Cadillac ELR plug-in hybrid electric vehicle recharging its traction battery through a SAE J1772 connector

A hybrid vehicle that can be plugged into the electric grid to recharge its battery to reduce gasoline usage.

Powertrain

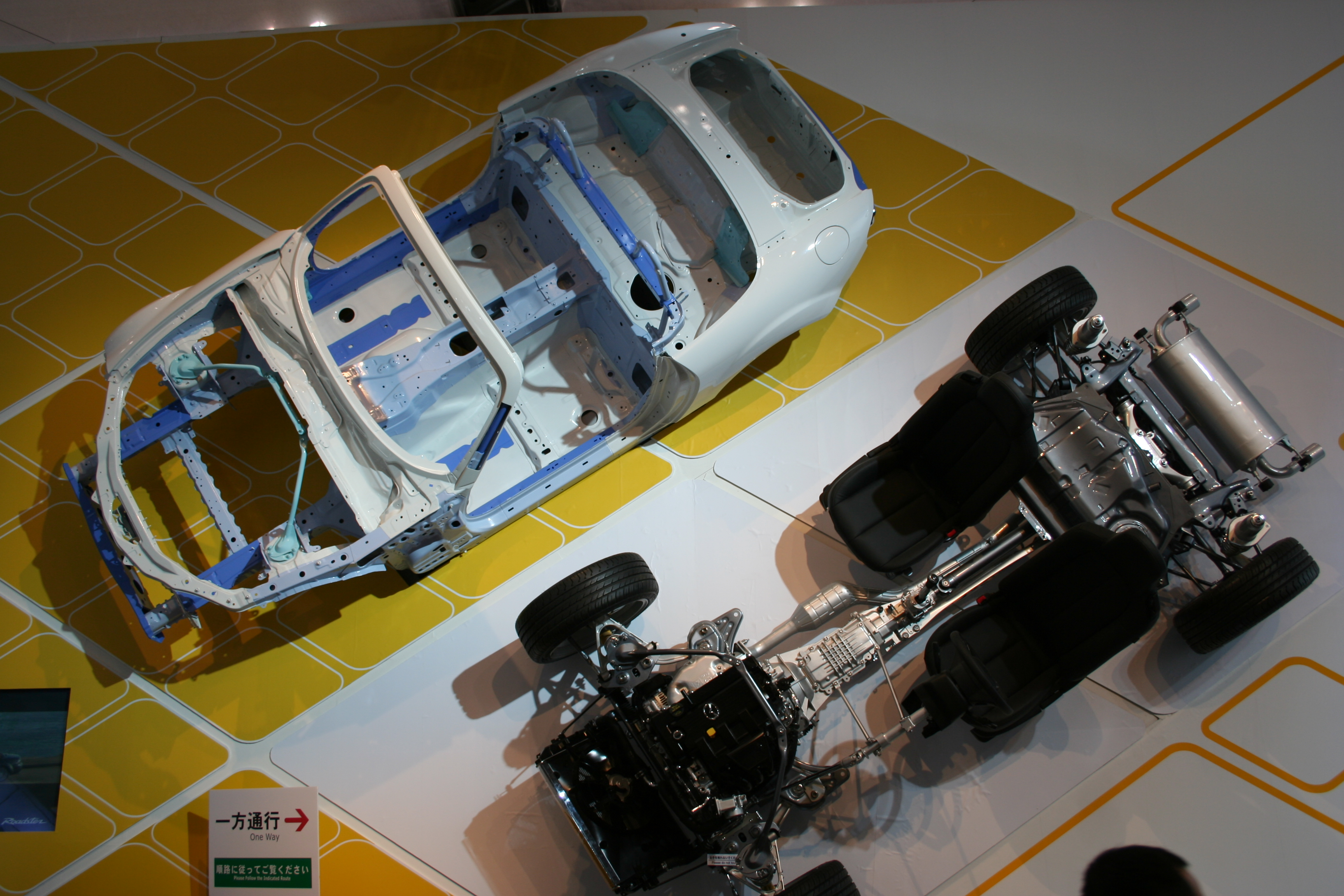
Mazda MX-5 (NC) with body (in white, left) removed to show chassis and powertrain

All the components that generate power and deliver it to the tyres.

== Q ==
Quarter-panel
(or rear quarter panel) refers to the panel at the back sides starting at the rear edge of the rearmost doors, bordered by at top by the trunk (boot) lid and at bottom by the rear wheel arches ending at the rear bumper. This is the opposite of the fender.
- Literally, the term originally referred to the rear quarter or the car's length.

== R ==
Rake

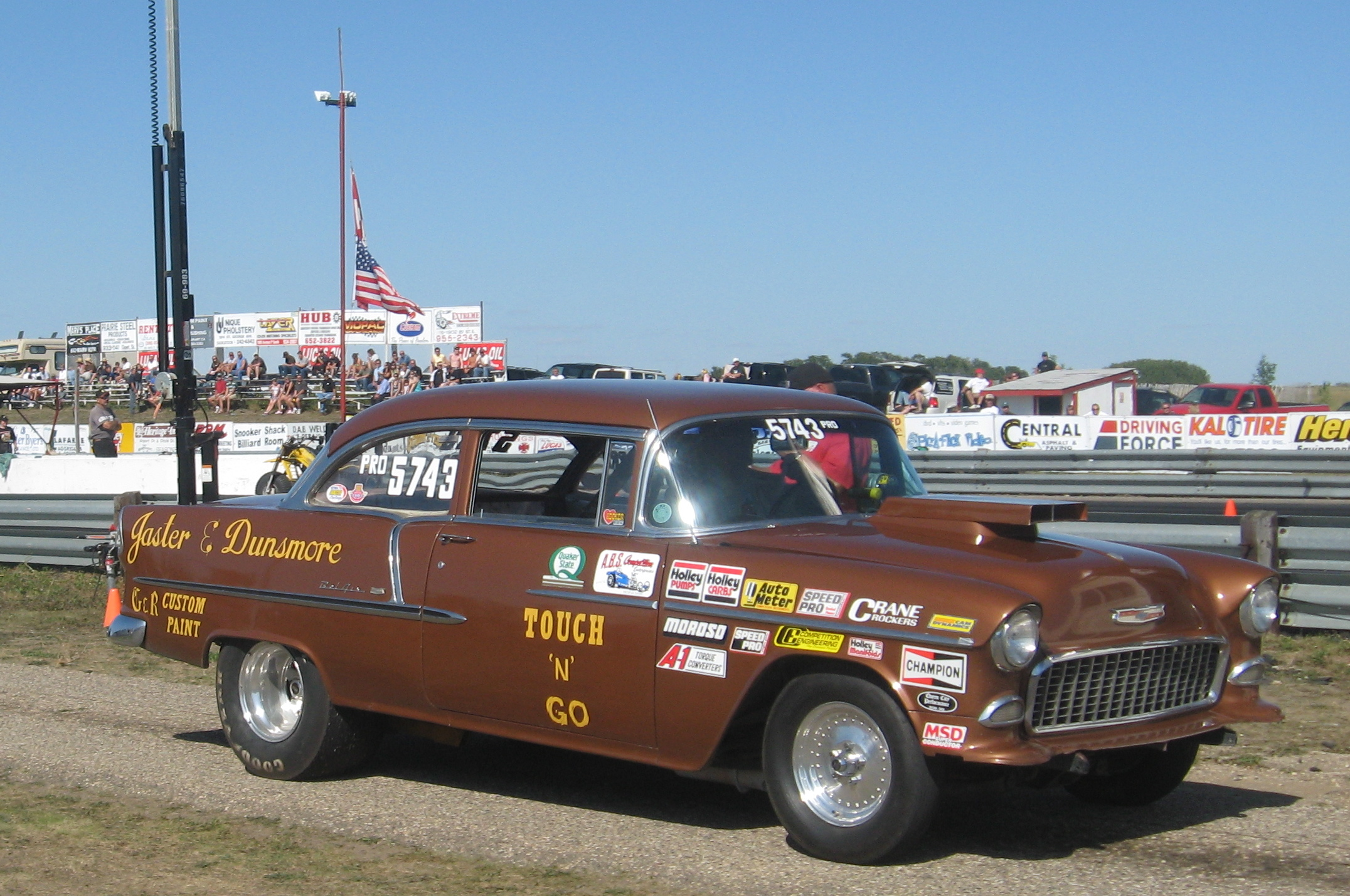
Customized Chevrolet Bel Air hot rod with positive rake

The first application of the term rake in vehicles was probably the tilting back of the windshield's top. Nowadays rake refers to the angle between the overall vehicle and the horizontal axis of the ground. If the back is higher than the front, the vehicle is said to have positive rake; if the front is higher than the back, this is negative rake. In early hot rod and custom cars, positive rake was created by varying tire size, and/or by suspension modification. In today's body design, positive rake is integral in some vehicles' styling, e.g. Mercedes E350 sedan, circa 2012/13.

Roadster

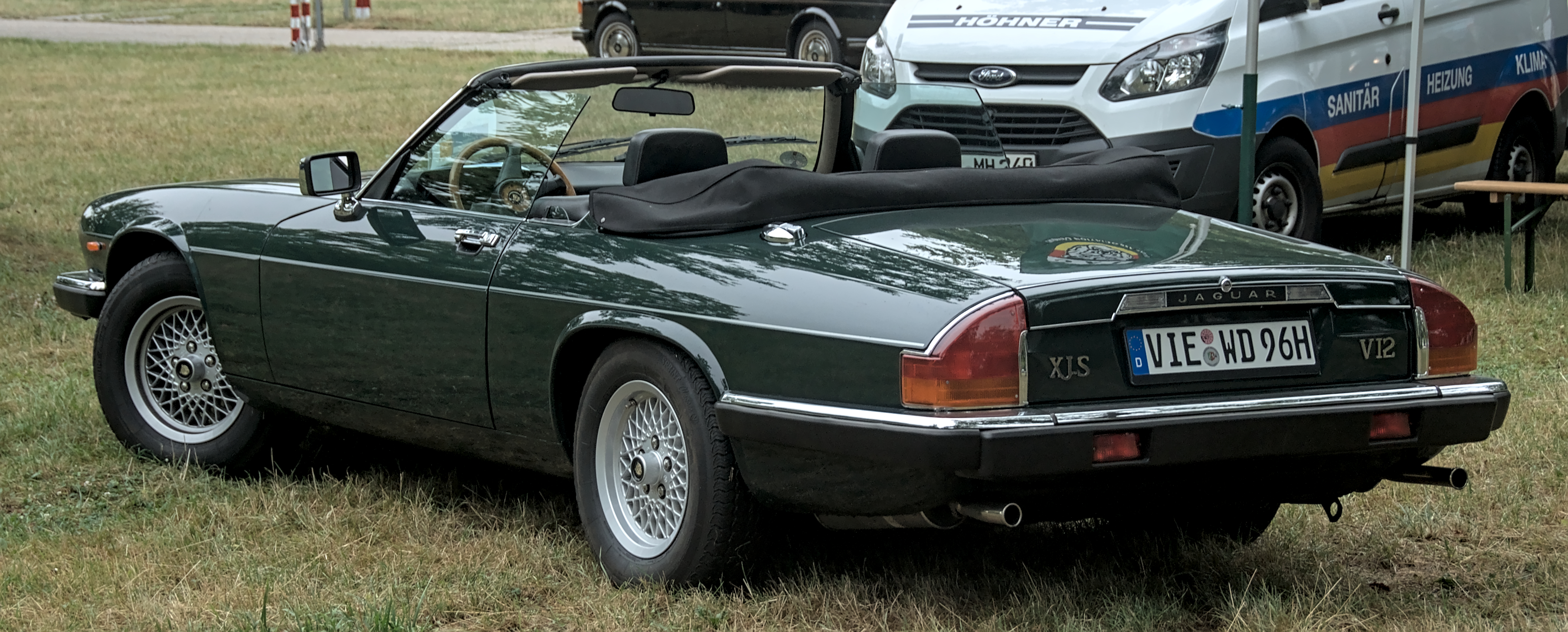
Jaguar XJ-S roadster

An open vehicle, usually with 2 doors, with a removable and/or retractable cloth top and a windshield characterized by the lack of integrated glass side windows. Contemporary uses of this name do not always follow this original description. A classical roadster is a two-seater with a long hood and a short back, which means the driver is sitting in the rear of the vehicle (close to the rear axle). Usually it is a rear-wheel-driven car.

Rocker

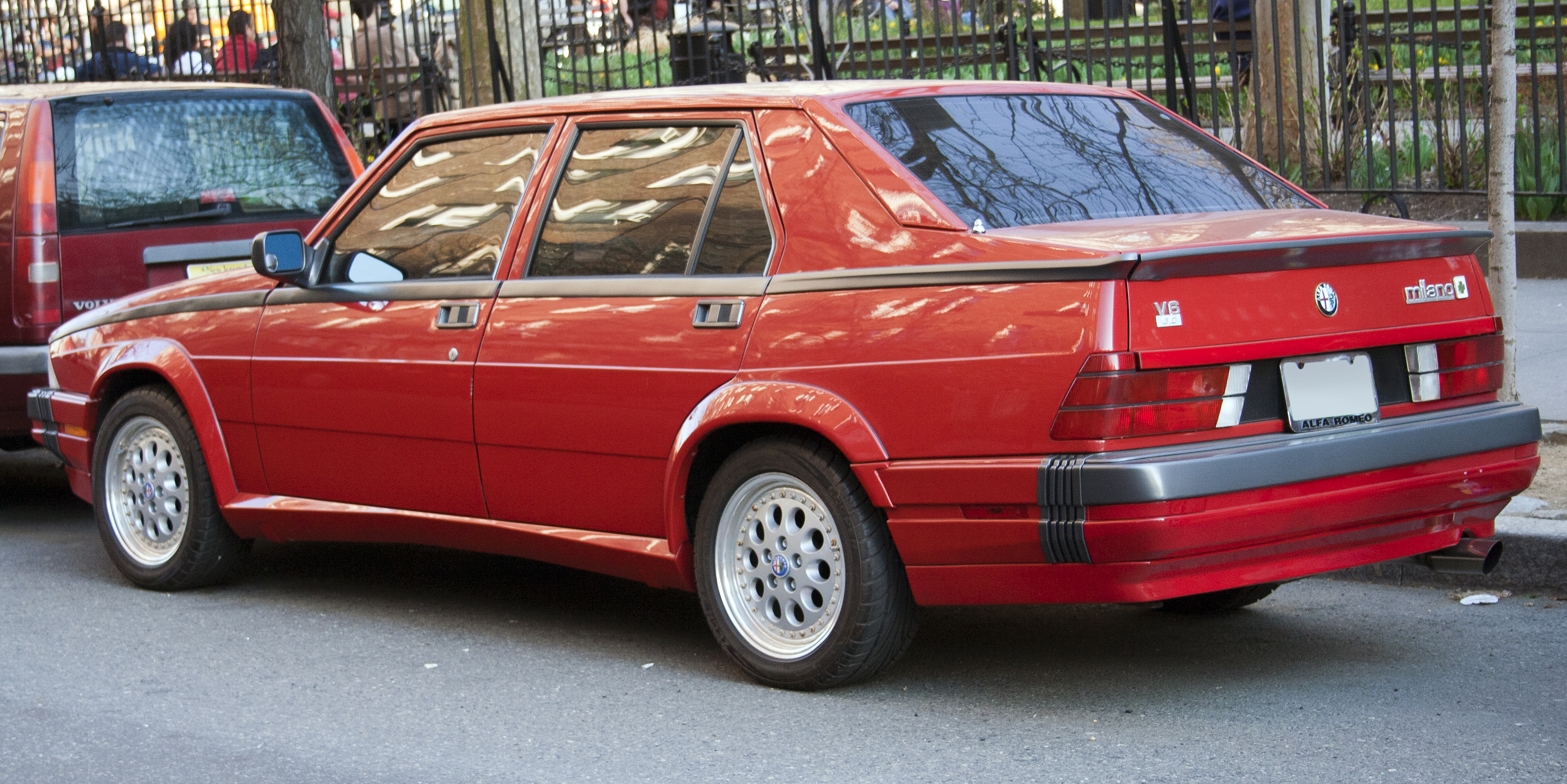
Alfa Romeo 75 with prominent extended body-colored rocker panels and fender flares

The body section below the base of the door openings sometimes called the "rocker panels", or § sills.

Rocker rail
Body armor protecting the Rocker, found mostly in off-road vehicles. Term coined by engineers at MetalCloak.
Rubbing strip

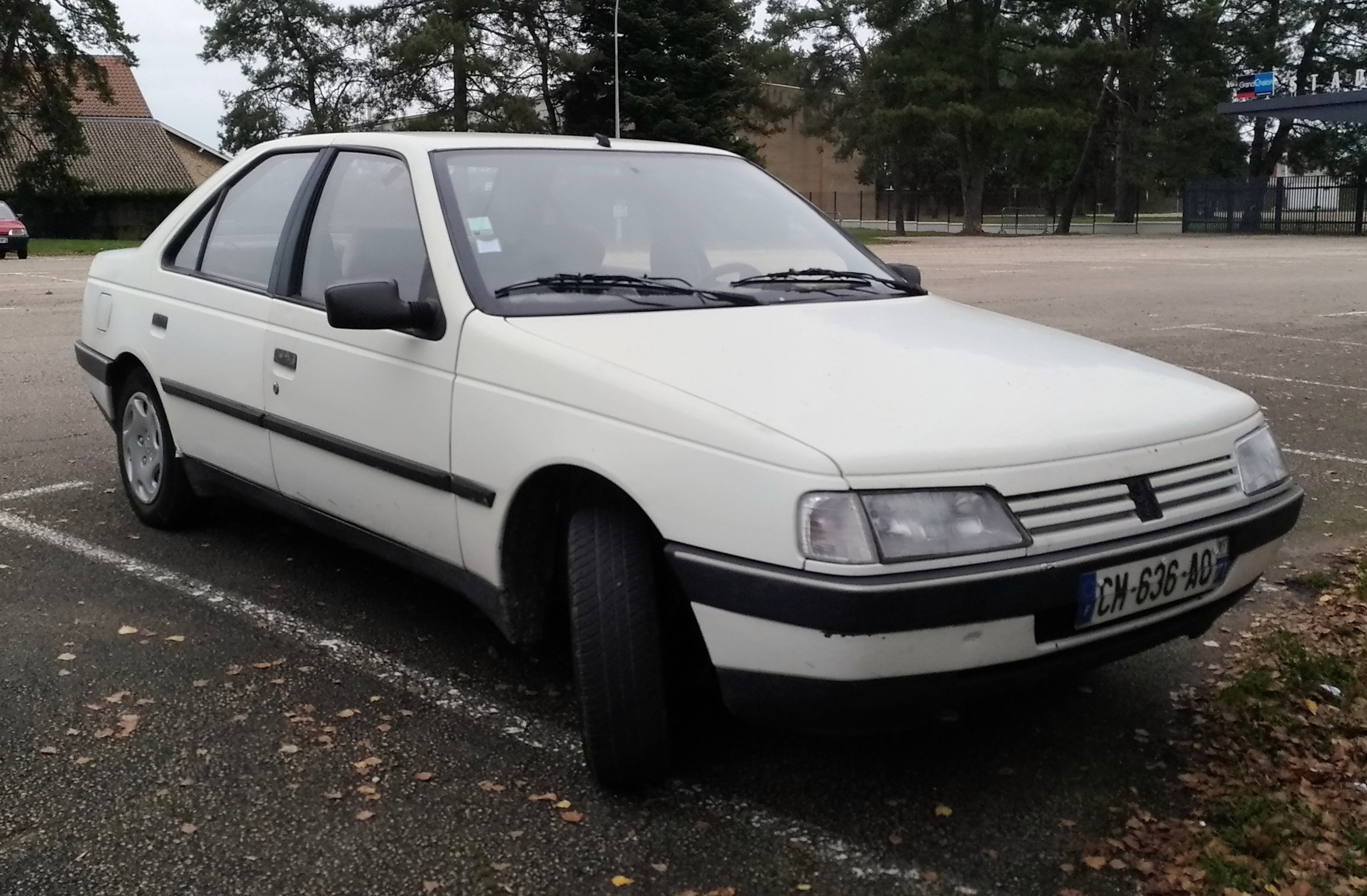
Peugeot 405 with prominent black rubbing strips running horizontally along the sides

Plastic/rubber line or moulding to prevent side-swiping along the doors.

== S ==
Saab hockey stick

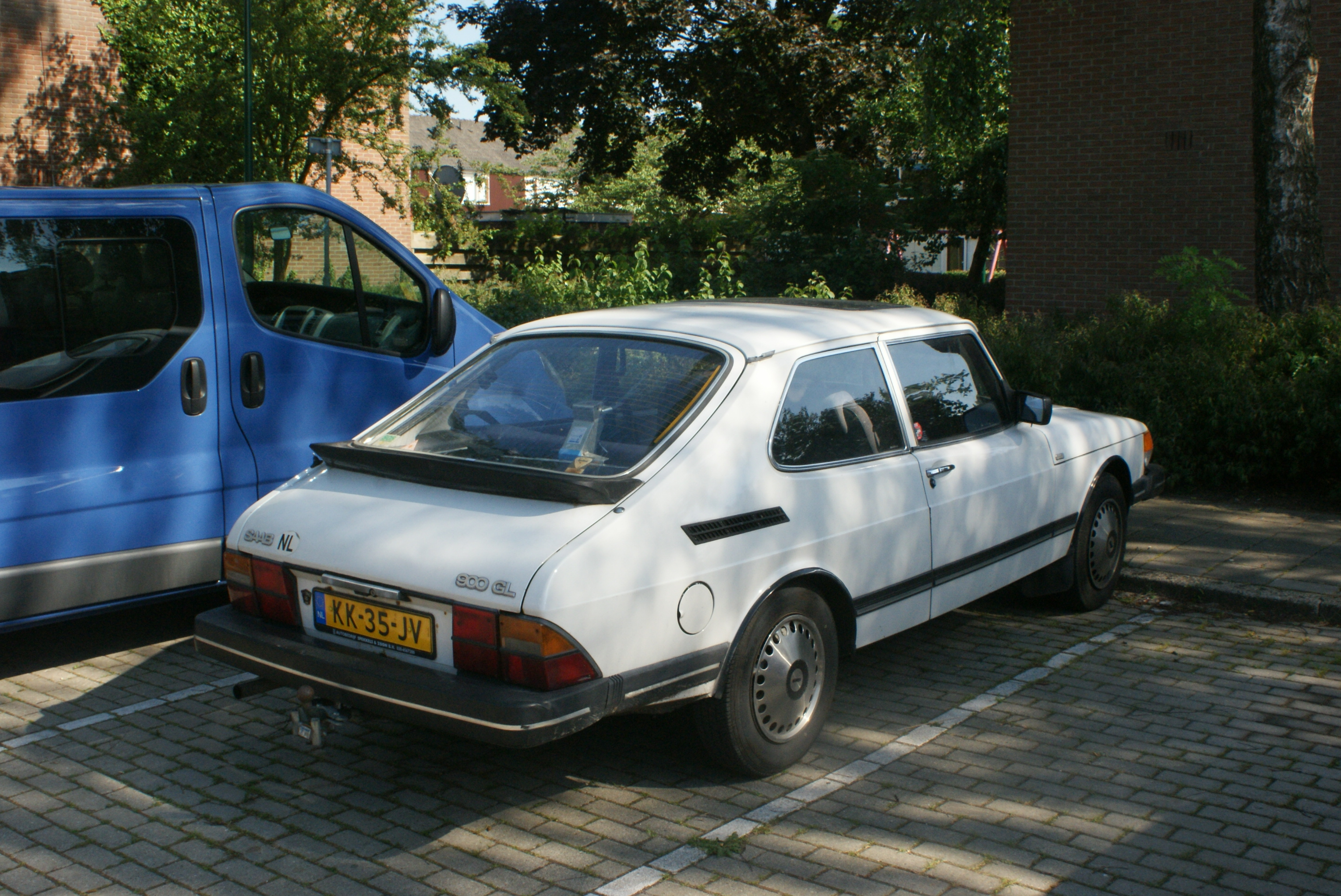
Saab hockey stick C-pillar curve on Saab 900 hatch

The hockey stick is an automotive design feature seen on nearly all Saab automobiles. It refers to the curve formed by the C-pillar in the rear corner at the base of the rear passenger window, which resembles the shape of an ice hockey stick or the Nike swoosh symbol.

Scissor doors

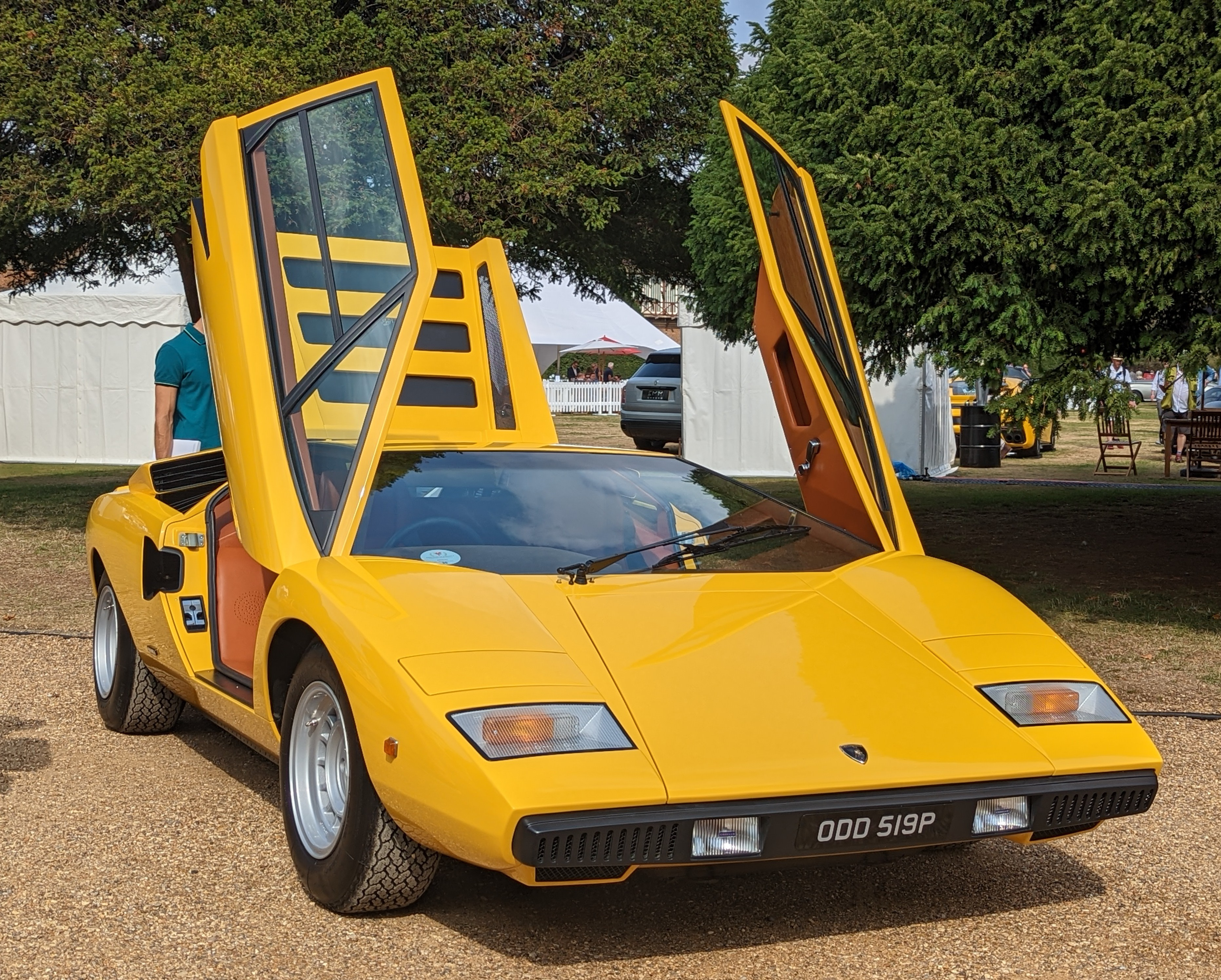
Lamborghini Countach LP400 with scissor doors open

(Lamborghini doors) are automobile doors that rotate vertically at a fixed hinge at the front of the door, rather than outward as with a conventional door.

Scoop

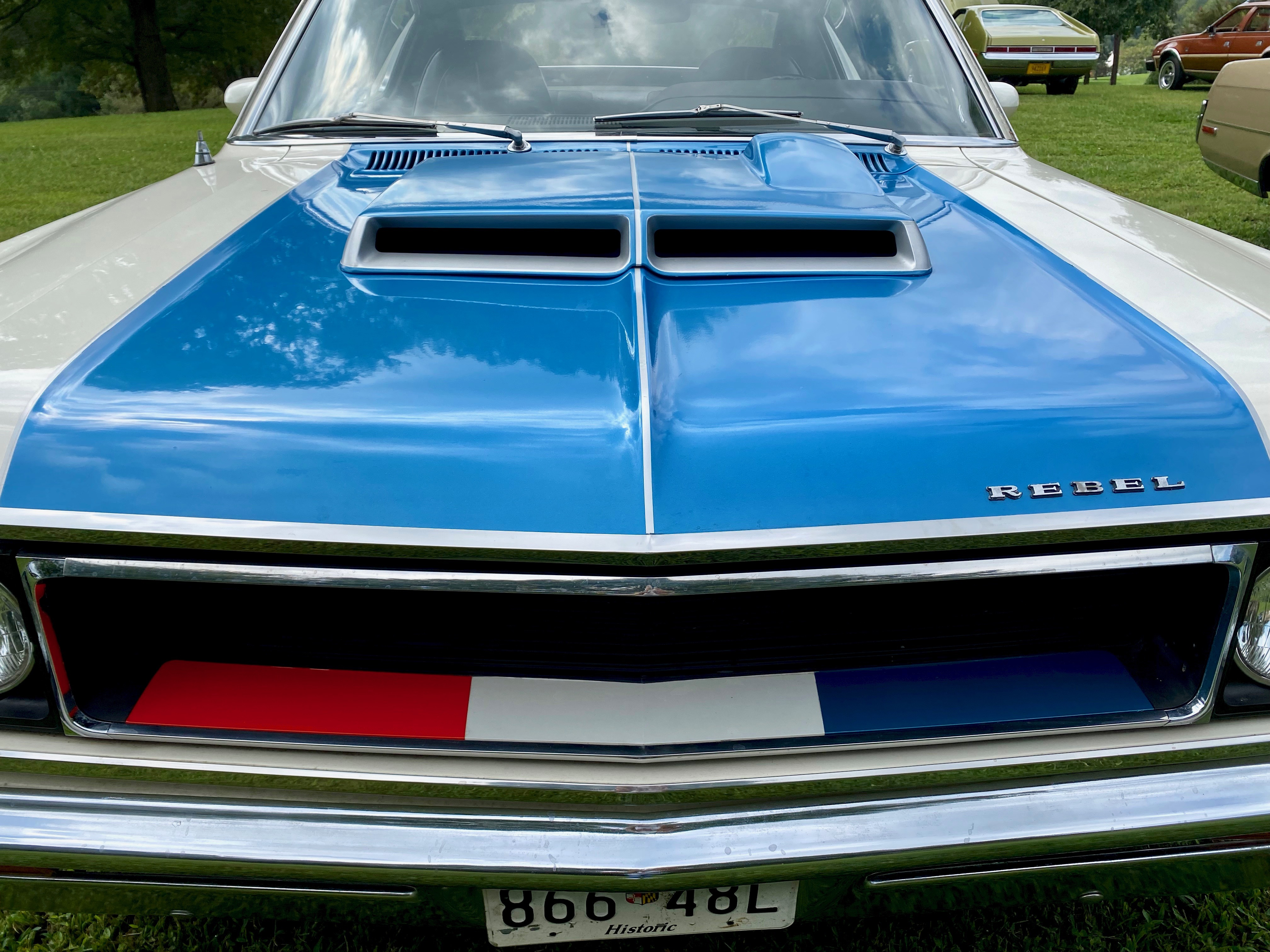
Intake scoop on top of the hood of an AMC Rebel "The Machine"

Inset or protrusion that implies the intake of air. May be functional for cooling/ventilation or purely ornamental. When mounted directly to the engine and allowed to protrude through the hood/bonnet, known as a shaker scoop as it vibrates in response to the throttle.

Scowling headlamps

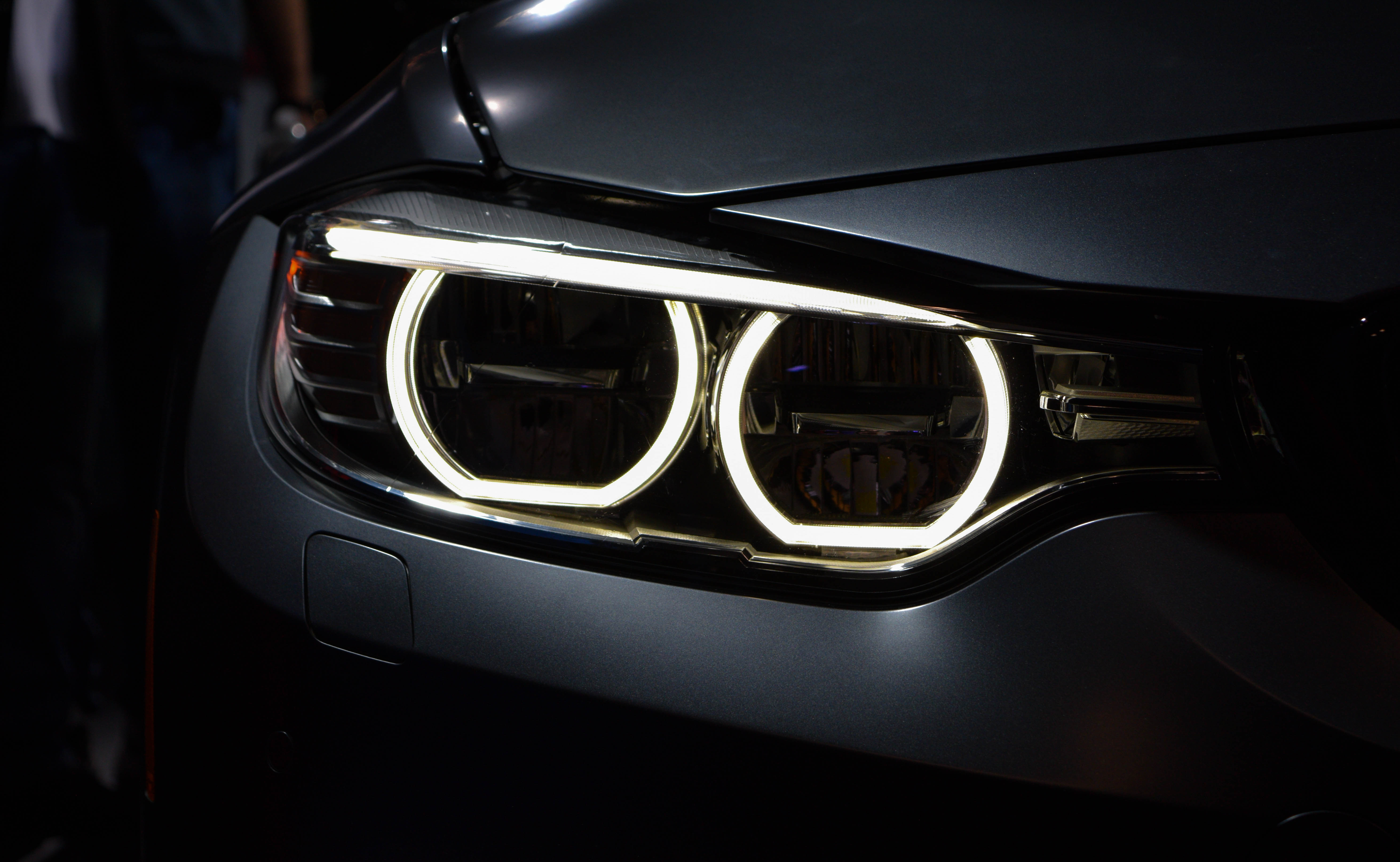
Scowling headlamps of the BMW M4 GTS

Headlamps styled along a V-shape as viewed from the front, giving the impression of a scowl.

Scuttle
The part of the body on a convertible or roadster where the windscreen is mounted. The term is used primarily in the UK.
Shooting-brake

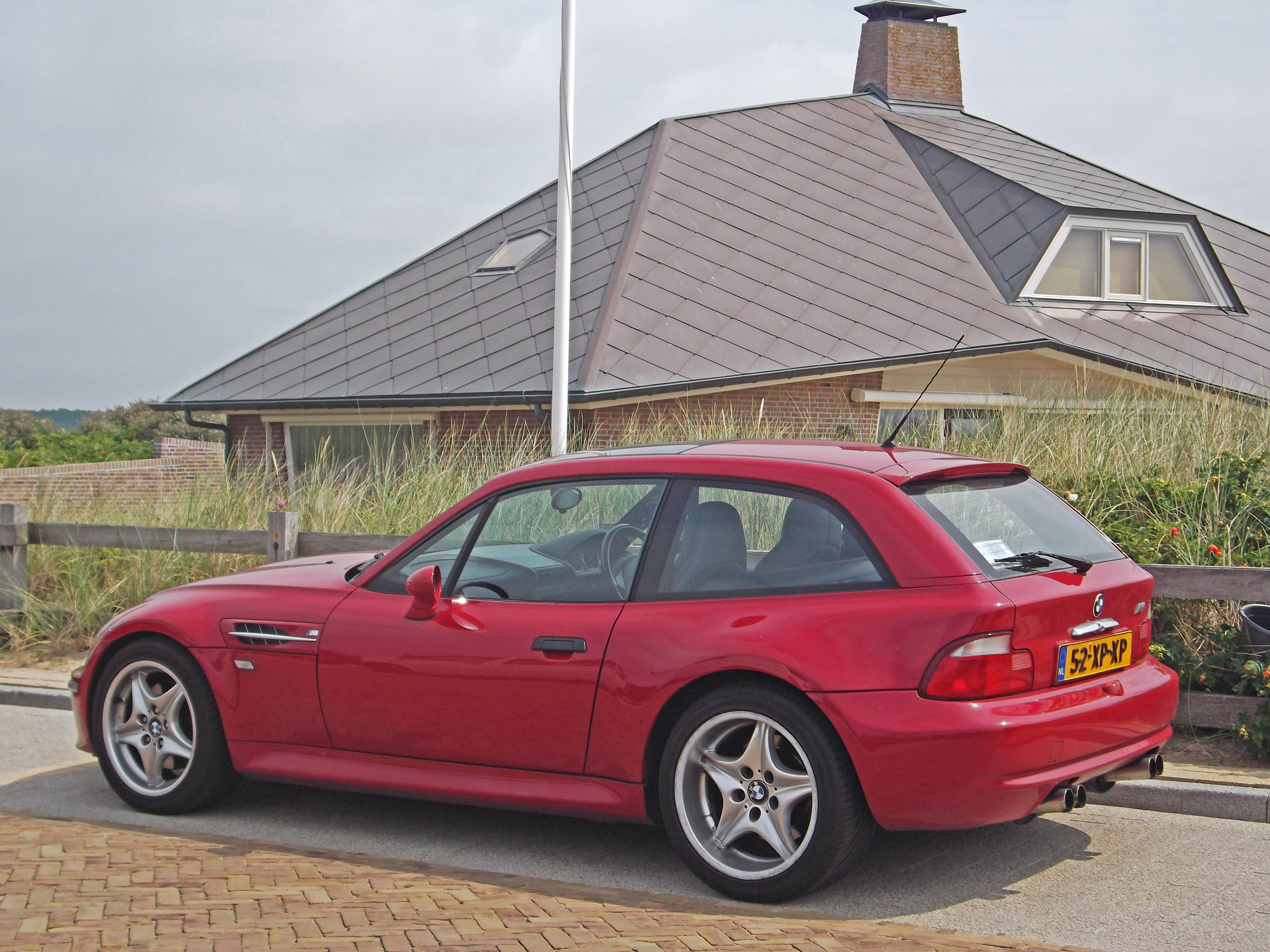
BMW M Coupe shooting-brake

Once a vehicle designed to carry hunters and sportsmen; now a station wagon or vehicle combining features of a station wagon and a coupe.

Shoulder

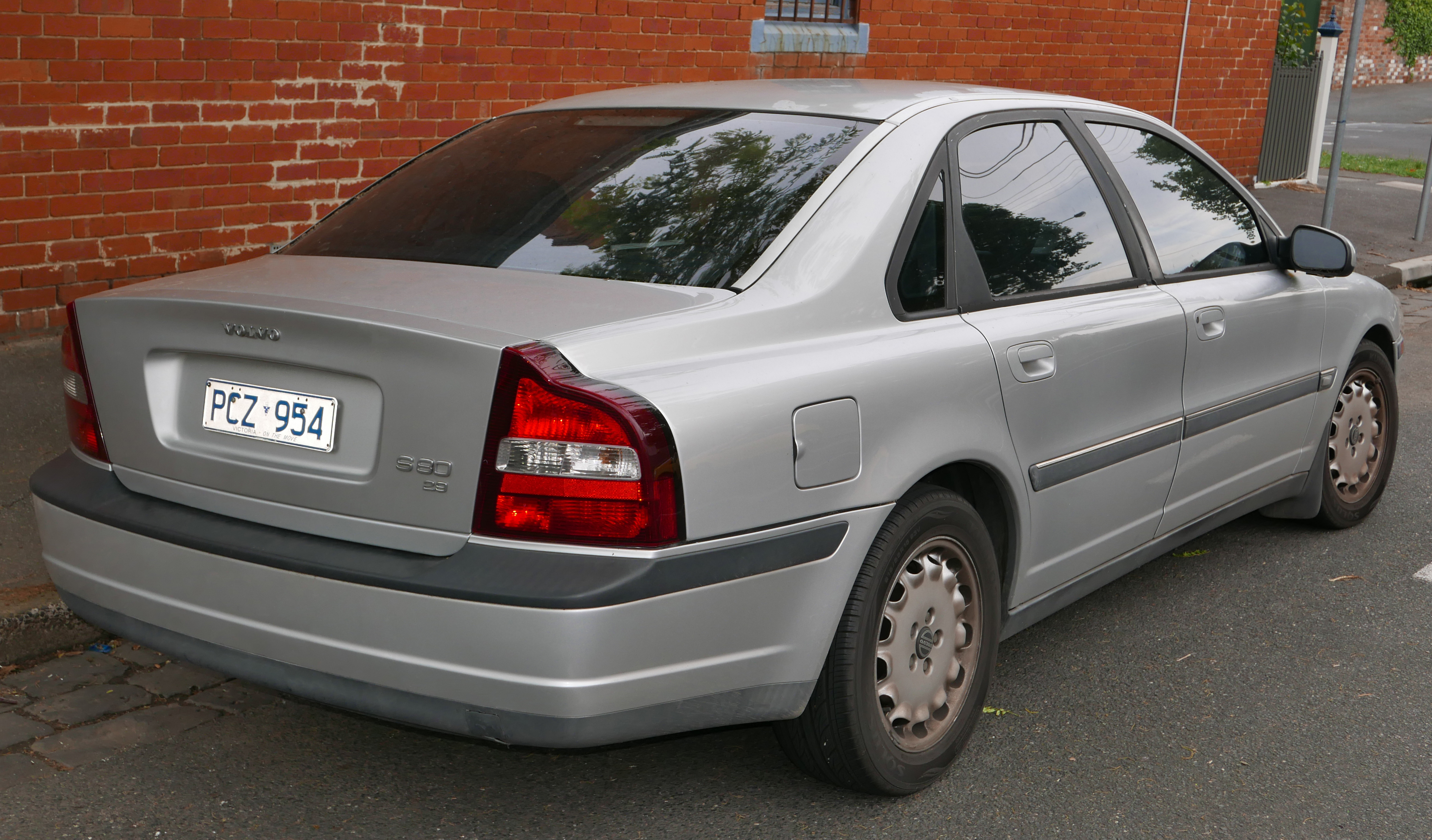
The shoulder line of a Volvo S80 (TS) extends from front to rear along the base of the greenhouse

A surface running along the car below the beltline which bends or creases into the vertical surface of the side of the car. The strongest example of this feature can be found on more modern of Volvo Cars.

Sill

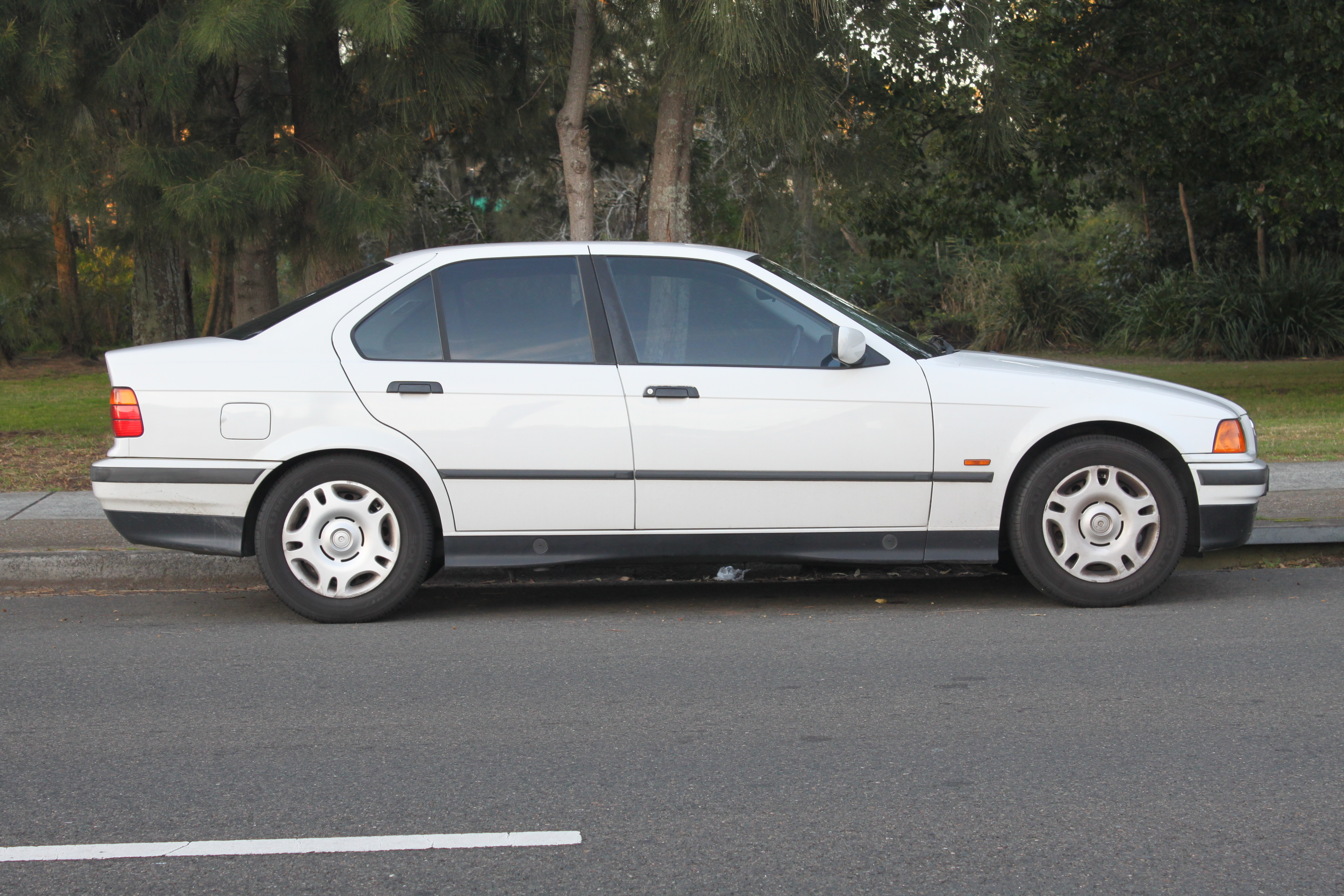
On lower trim levels of the BMW 3 Series (E36), the sill extensions below the door were left unpainted

The body section below the base of the door openings sometimes called the "rocker panels", or "rockers".

Sill line
Imaginary line drawn following the bottom edge of the greenhouse glass.
Six line
A line extending from the C-pillar down and around the rear wheel well.
Sixthlight

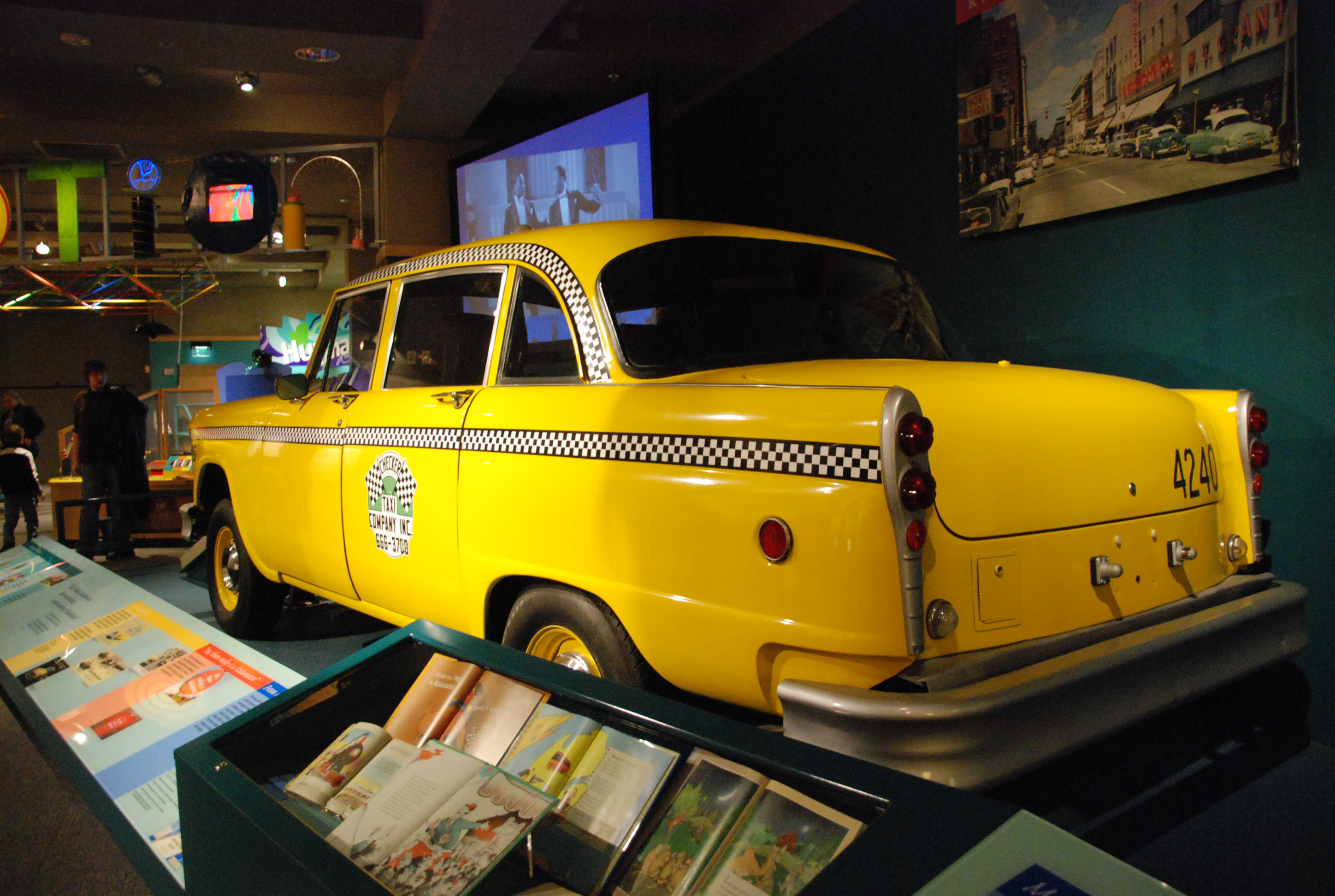
Checker A-11 taxi featured sixthlights for the rear-seat passengers

Also called quarter glass; fixed glass located in between the side-door and boot.
Softtop

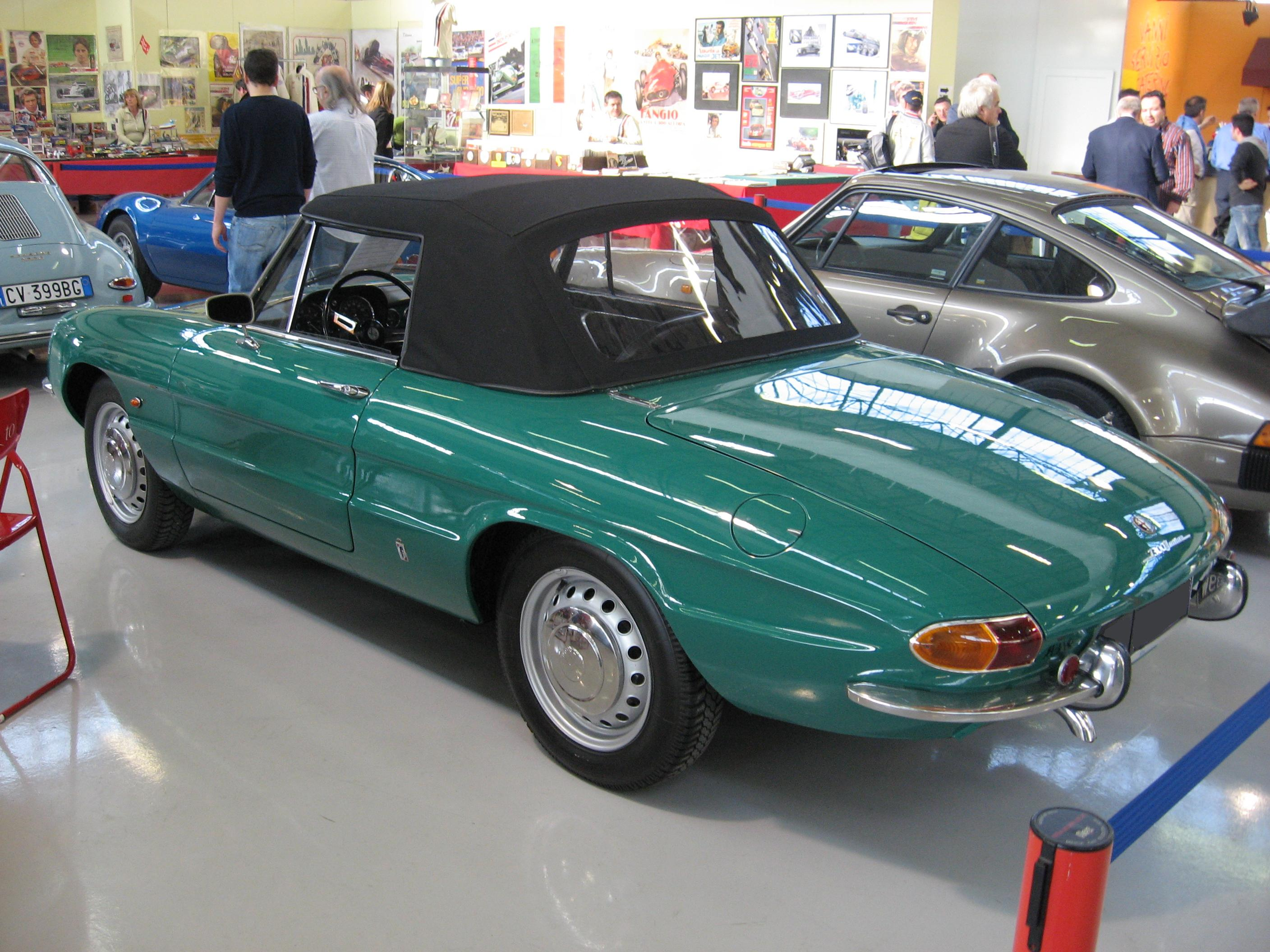
Alfa Romeo Spider with raised softtop

A convertible top which is made out of flexible materials like PVC or textile.

Spats

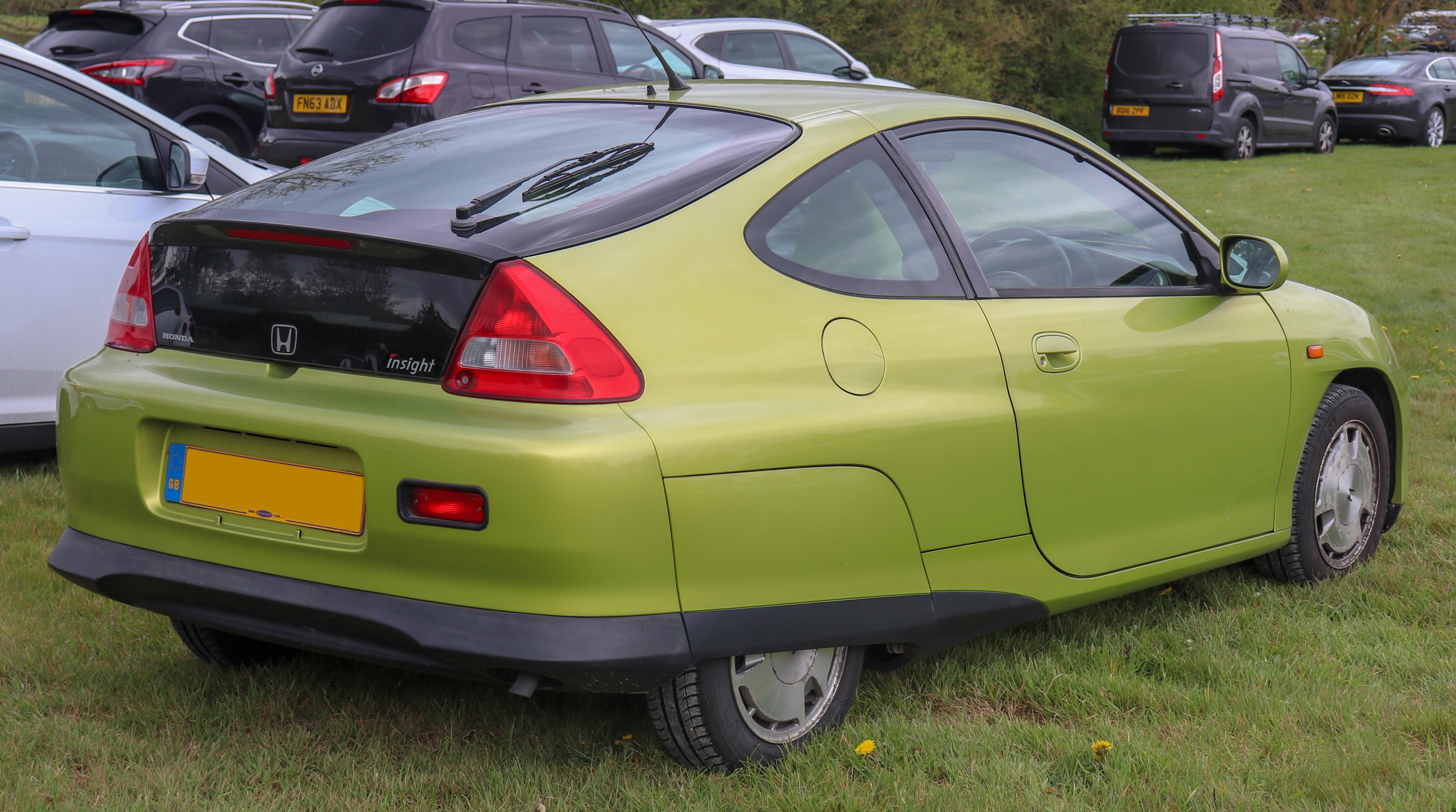
Honda Insight used spats on the rear wheel to reduce aerodynamic drag

Side covers for wheel arches, hiding the wheel—usually rear only. Also called fender skirts.

Split window

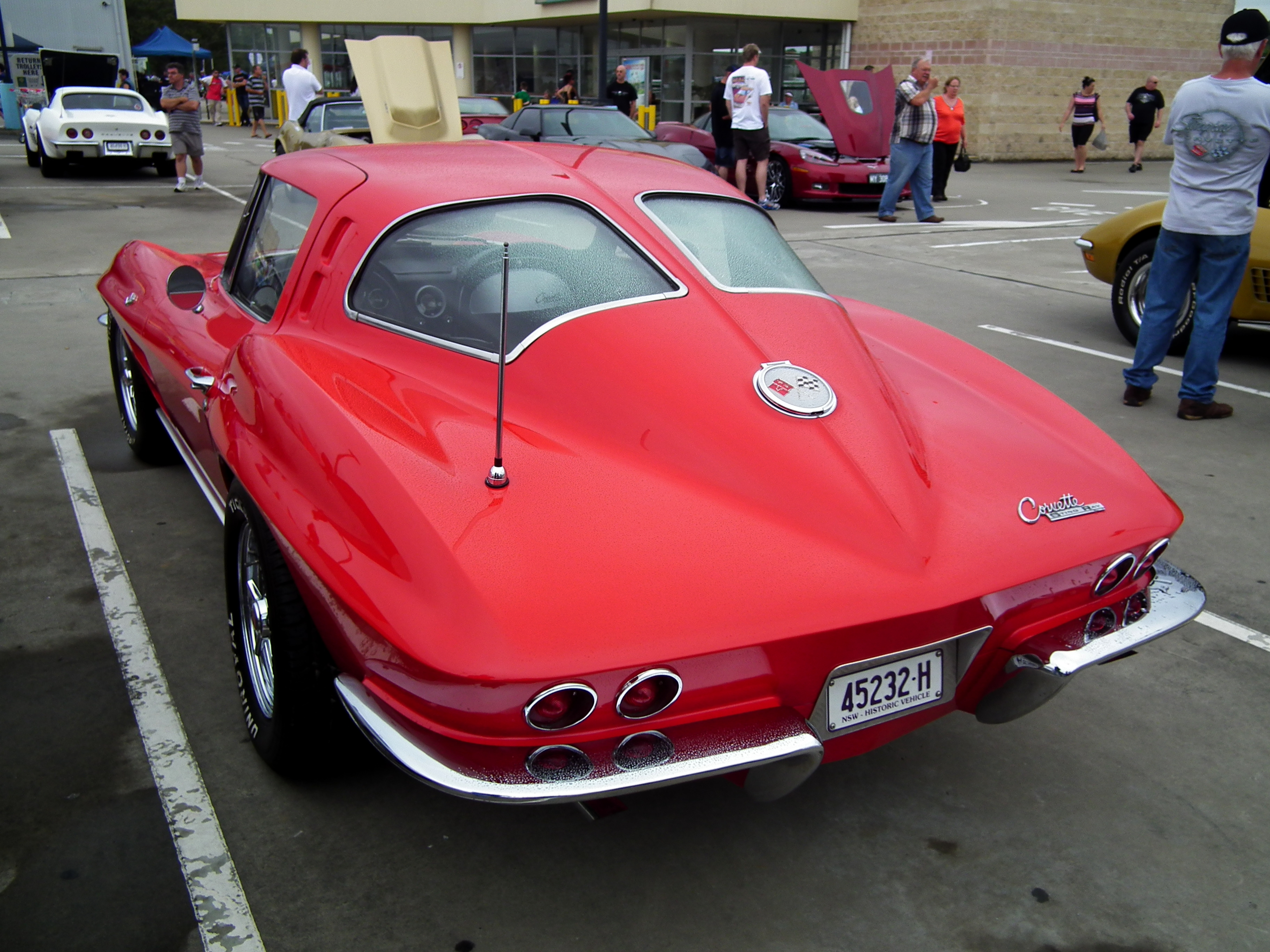
The divided rear window on this 1963 Chevrolet Corvette (C2) was only available for one model year.

A rear window (backlight) divided into two separate pieces of glass. Common in the 1930s, split rear windows fell out of fashion in part due to their impact on visibility.

Spoiler

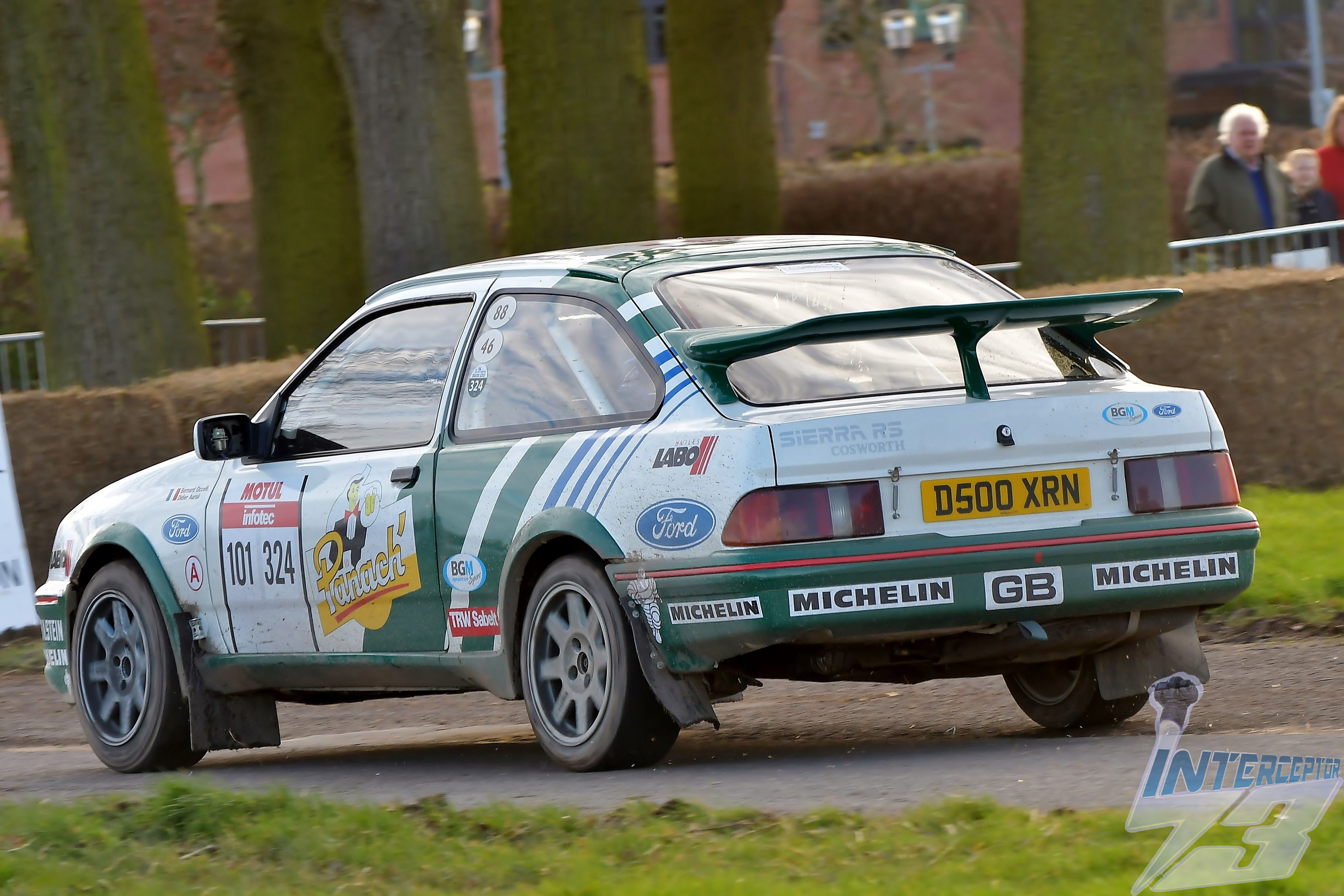
The large spoiler of the Ford Sierra RS Cosworth once campaigned by Didier Auriol bisects the rear backlight

A raised lip or wing which is used to "spoil" unfavorable air movement across the body. Some designs are more functional than others.

Staggered wheel fitment
The front and rear wheels are different widths. On sporty rear-wheel-drive cars, the rear tires are usually wider than the front.
Strake

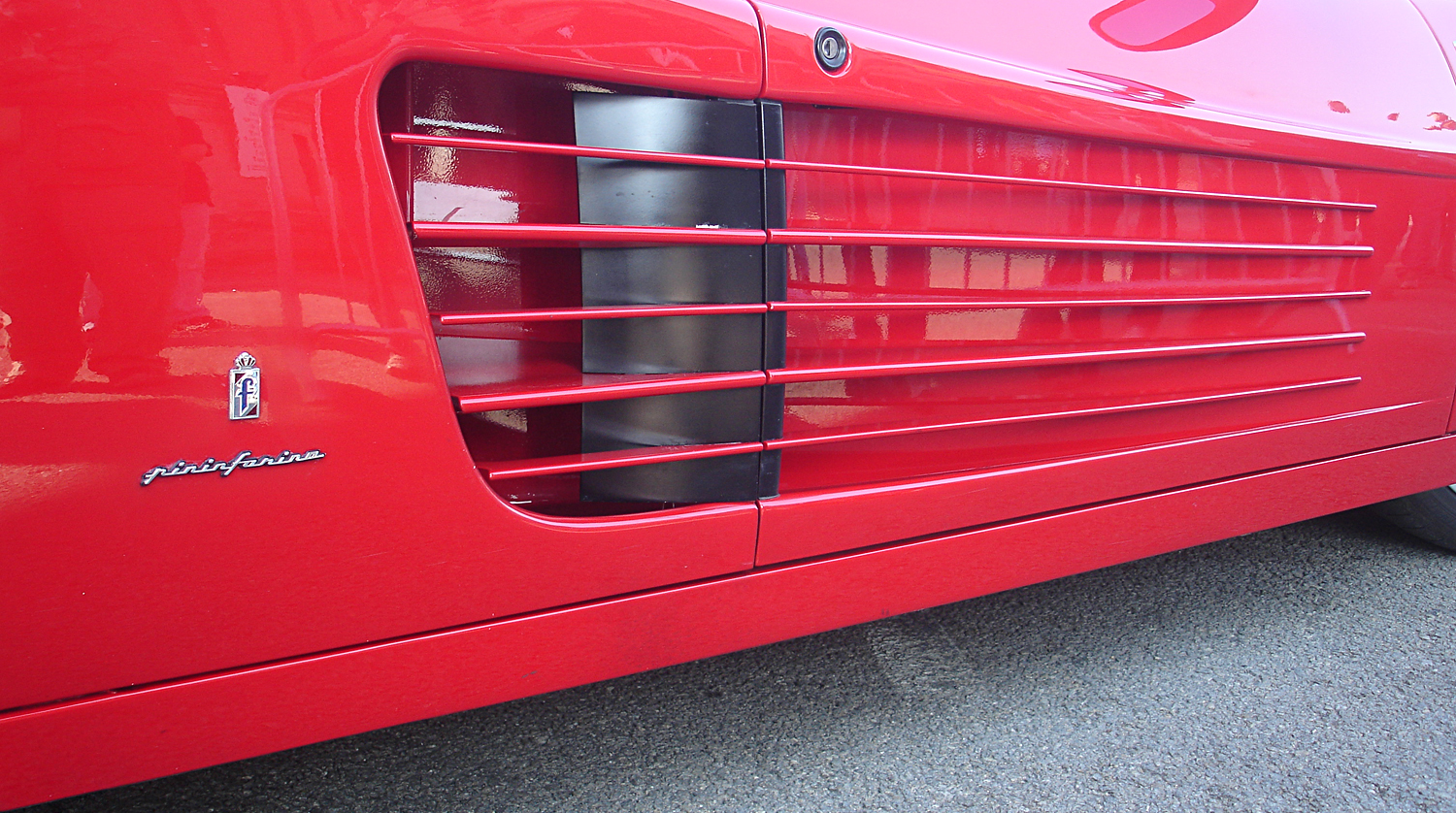
Prominent strakes on the side of the Ferrari 512TR extend onto the doors

Crease in the sheet metal intended as a "speed line" styling feature. Exemplified in the doors of the Ferrari Testarossa.

Suicide door

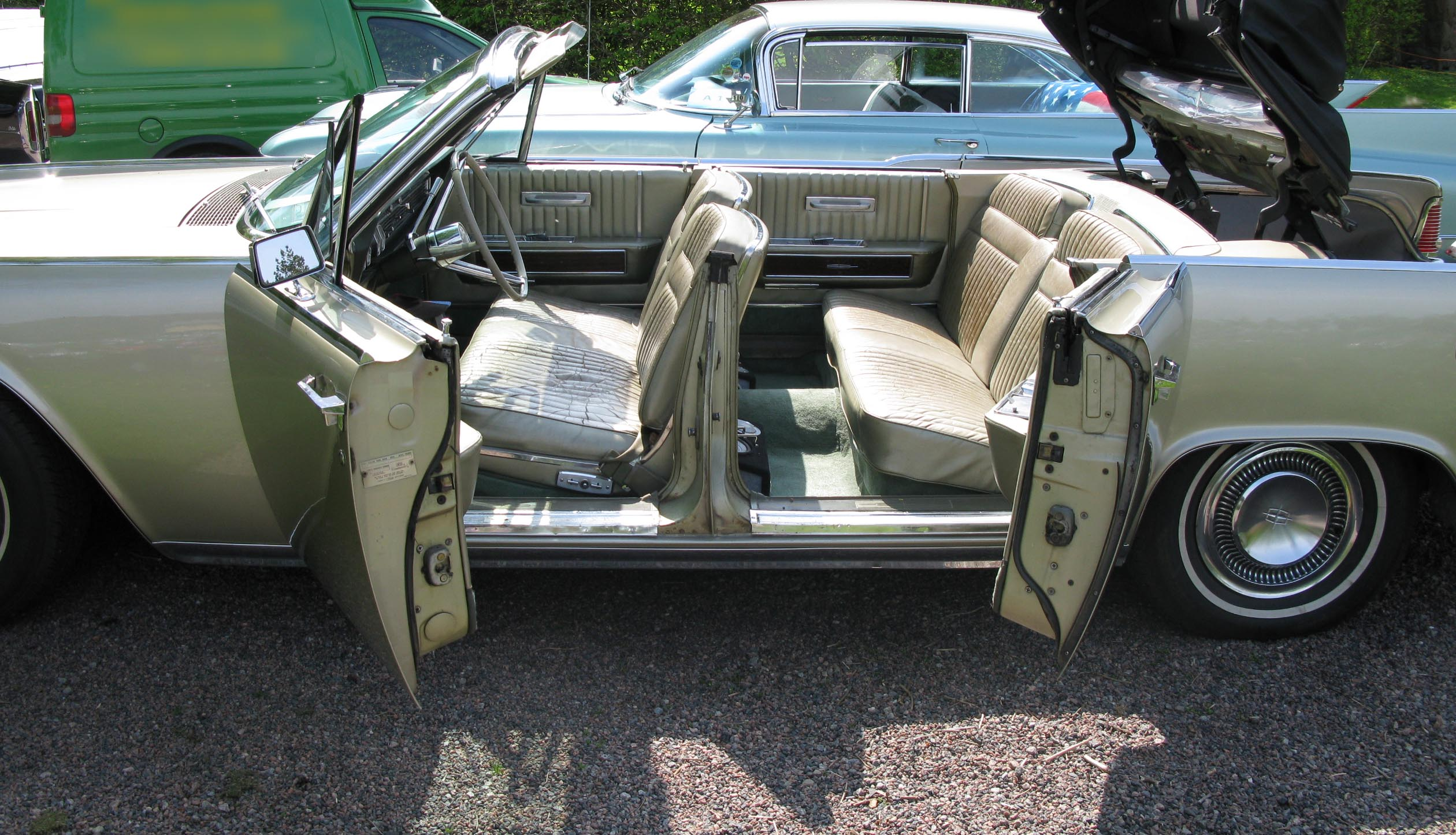
Lincoln Continental with front and rear suicide door open

Side doors hinged at the rear of the car with the latch at the front of the car. If accidentally opened while driving at a high speed, such doors would be blown backward.

Swage line

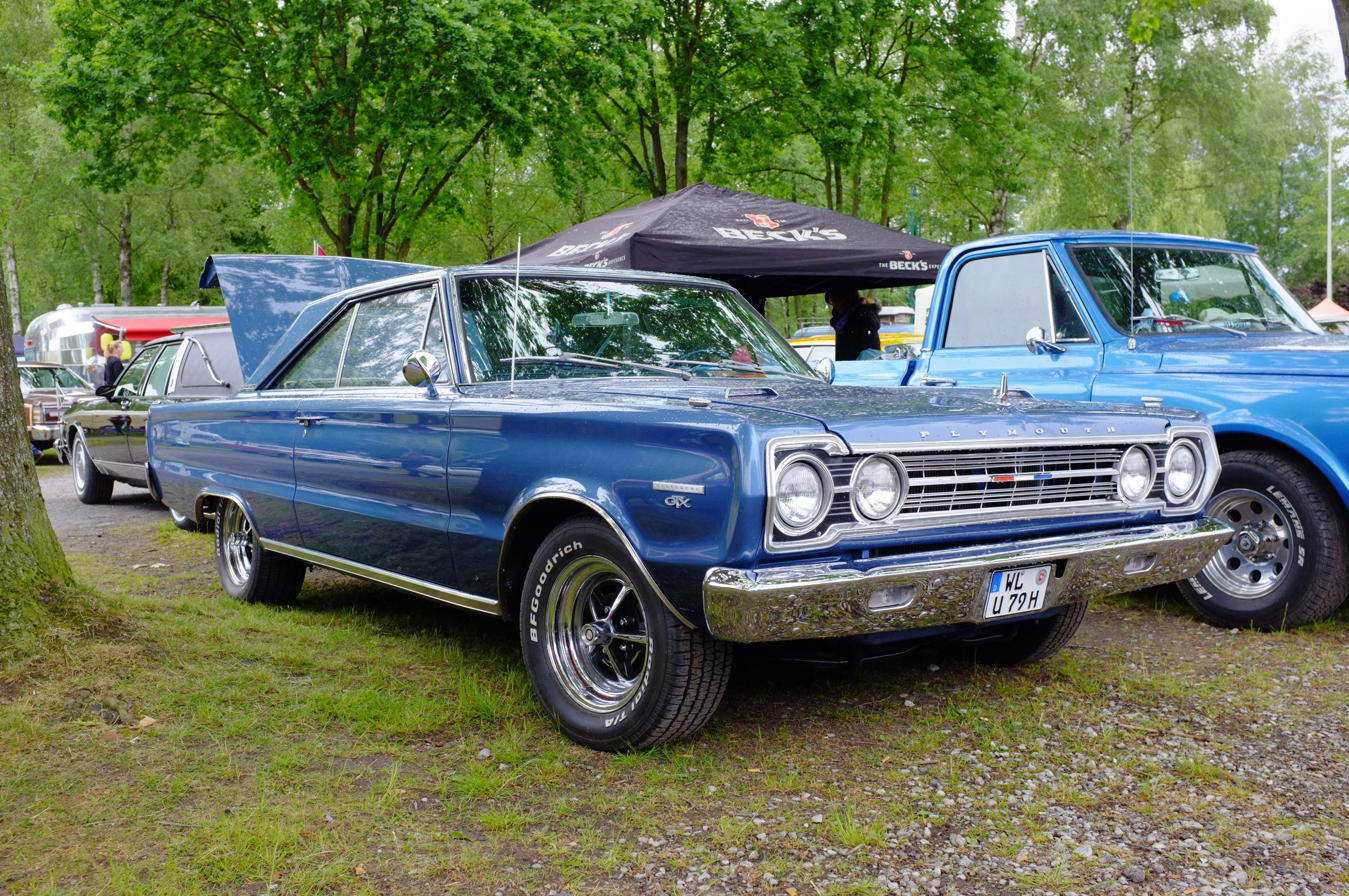
1967 Plymouth GTX with pronounced swage line running fore and aft

Crease or curvature in the side of the body used to create visual distinction. Sometimes the crease is functional and improves rigidity of the outer body (also known as character line).

Swan doors

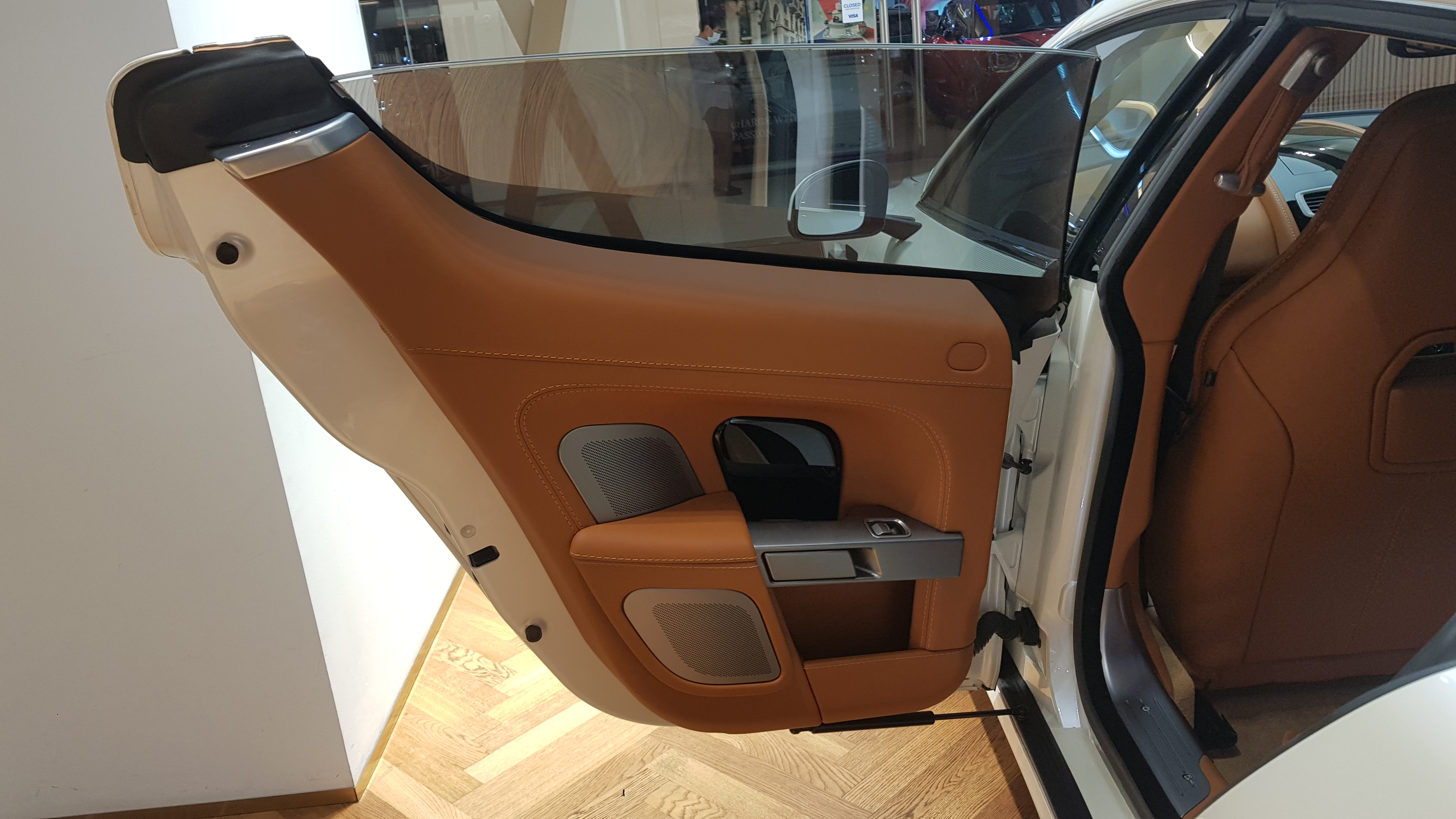
Open swan door on an Aston Martin Rapide S

Swan doors operate in a similar way to conventional car doors but unlike regular doors, they open at an upward angle. These help to prevent the bottom edges of doors on low cars from scraping on curbs. Common on Aston Martin cars.

Swedish kiss
A negative flick-out to a flat surface which frames trim sections or venting.

== T ==
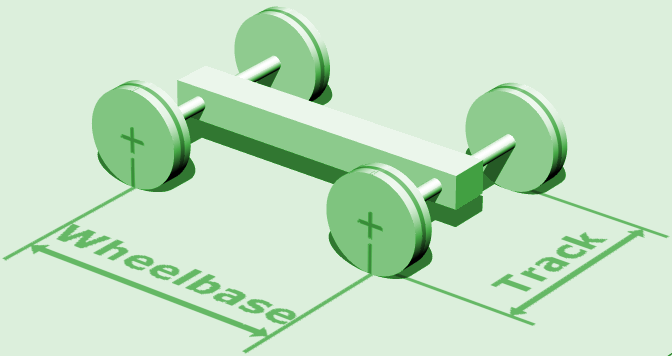
While wheelbase is measured axle-to-axle and generally does not change whether measured from the left or right side, track is measured wheel-to-wheel and may vary from front to rear

Track
The distance across the car between the base of the left and right wheels (like wheelbase, but side-to-side).

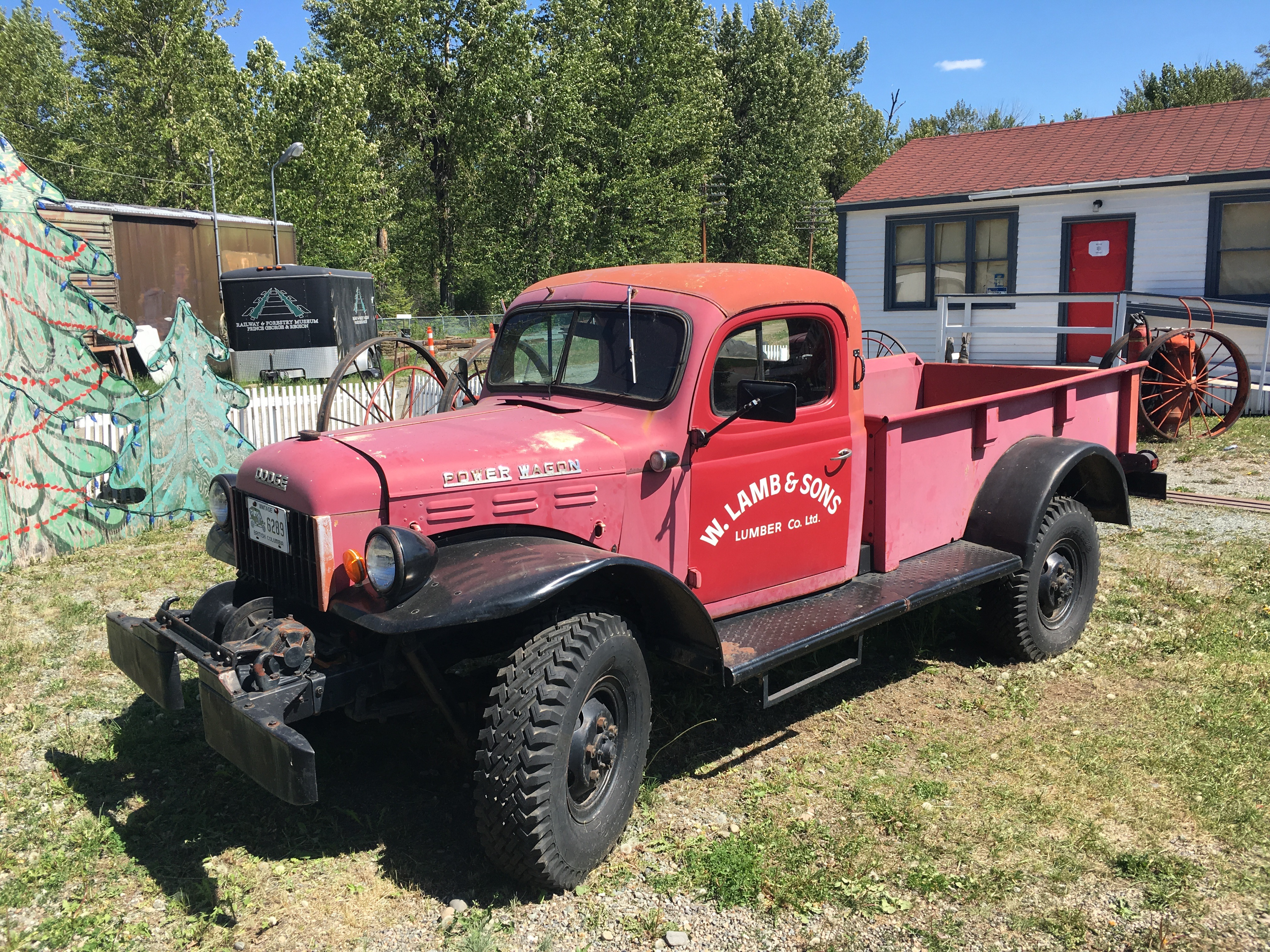
The Dodge Power Wagon truck was sold between 1945 and 1978

Truck
A typically large vehicle built using frame-on-rail construction consisting of a cab and a separate bed for cargo.

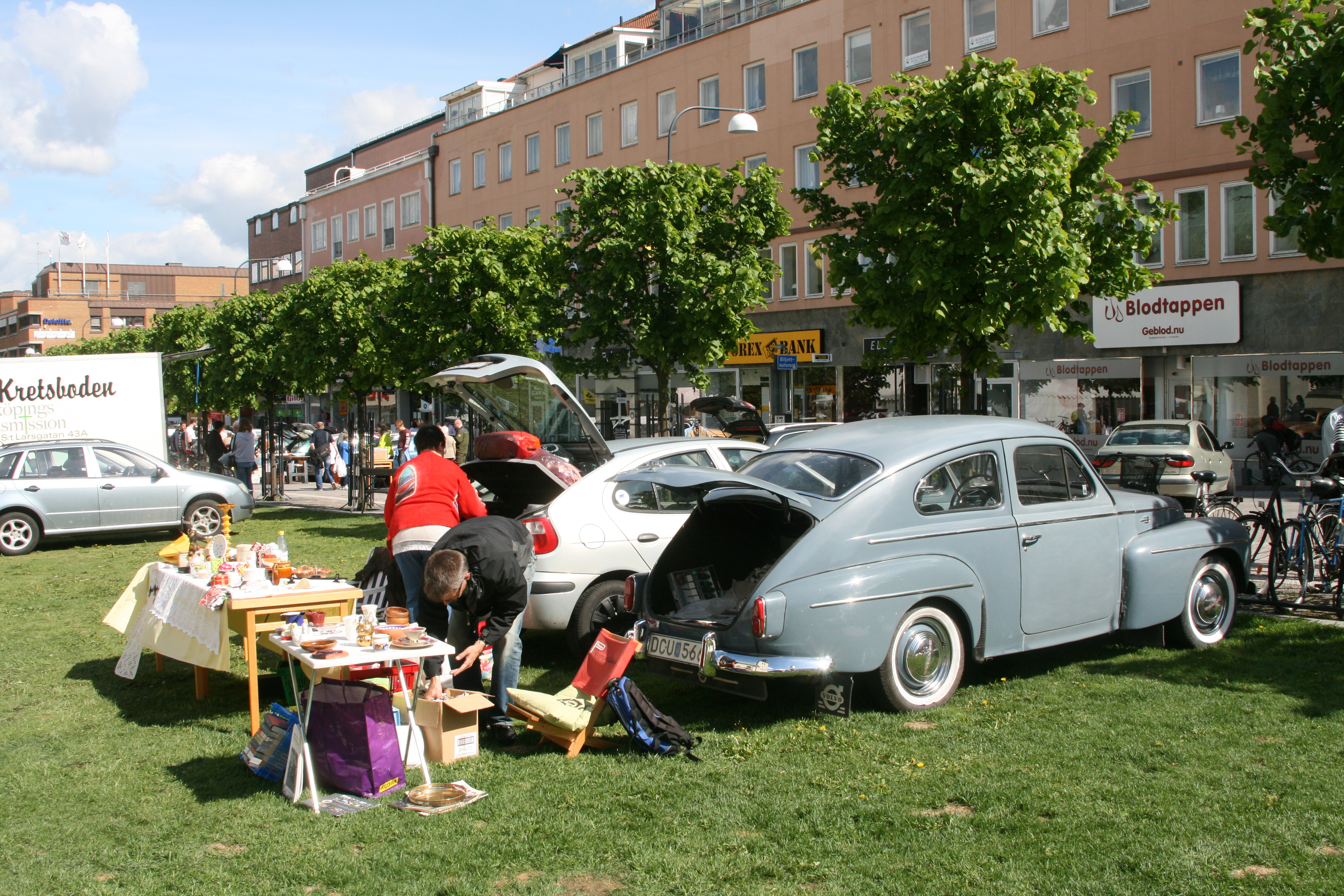
Car boot sales operate from the trunk or boot of an automobile

Trunk
(Boot in UK) Compartment for storage of cargo which is separate from the cab.

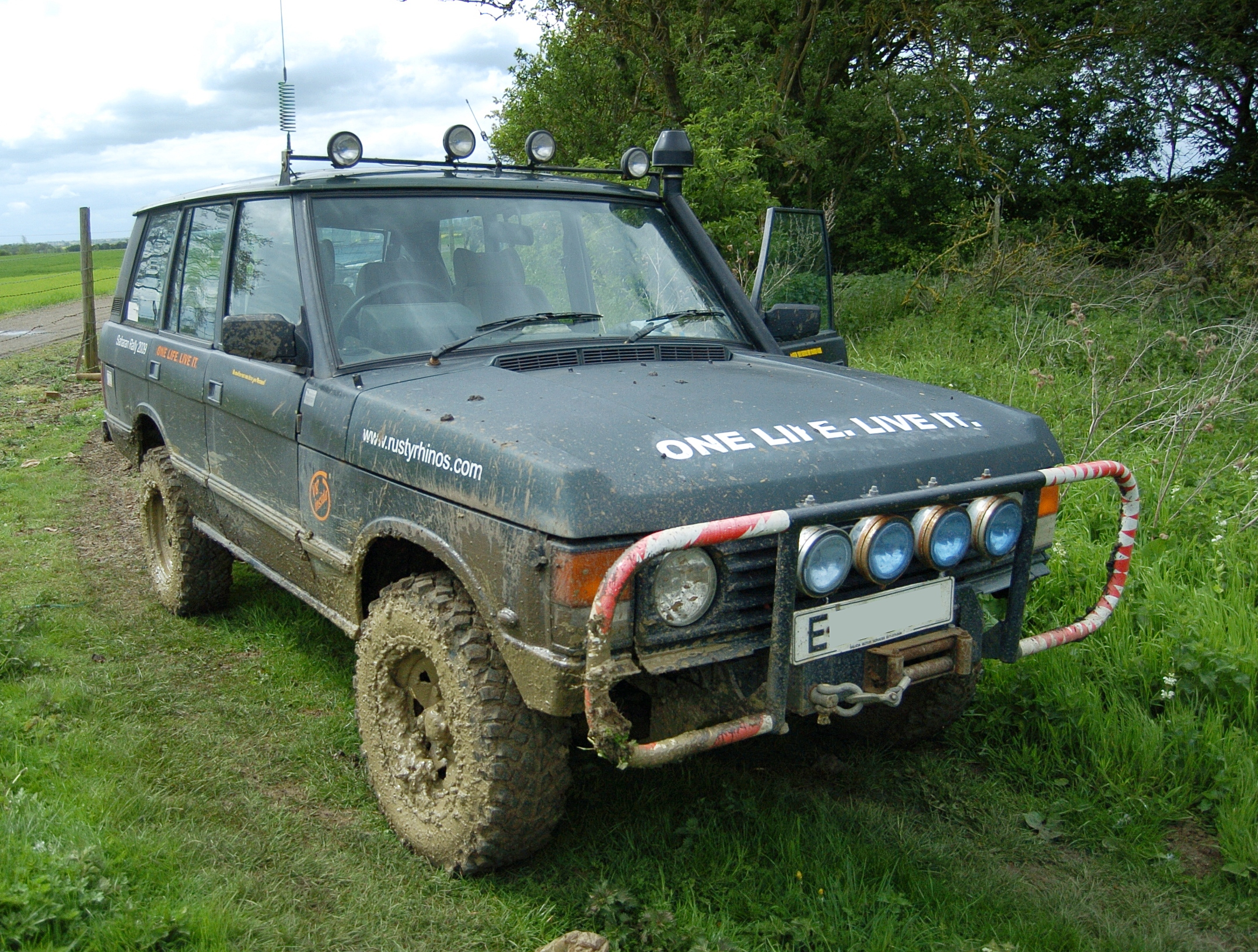
Range Rover Classic with a tube fender accessory protecting the front, replacing the bumper and carrying auxiliary lights and a winch

Tube Fender
Replacement fenders found on off-road vehicles designed as part of body armor for off-road vehicles. Used to protect the thin sheet metal bodies from damage while off-roading.

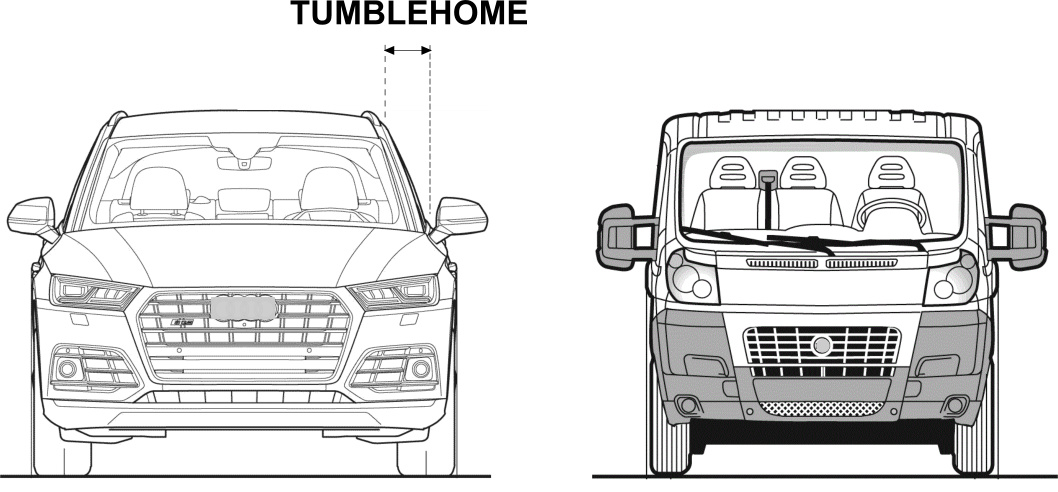
Illustration of tumblehome, comparing Audi Q7 with Fiat Ducato

Tumblehome
Refers to the way the sides of a car round inward toward the roof, specifically the sides of the greenhouse above the beltline. This term is borrowed from nautical description of marine vessels.

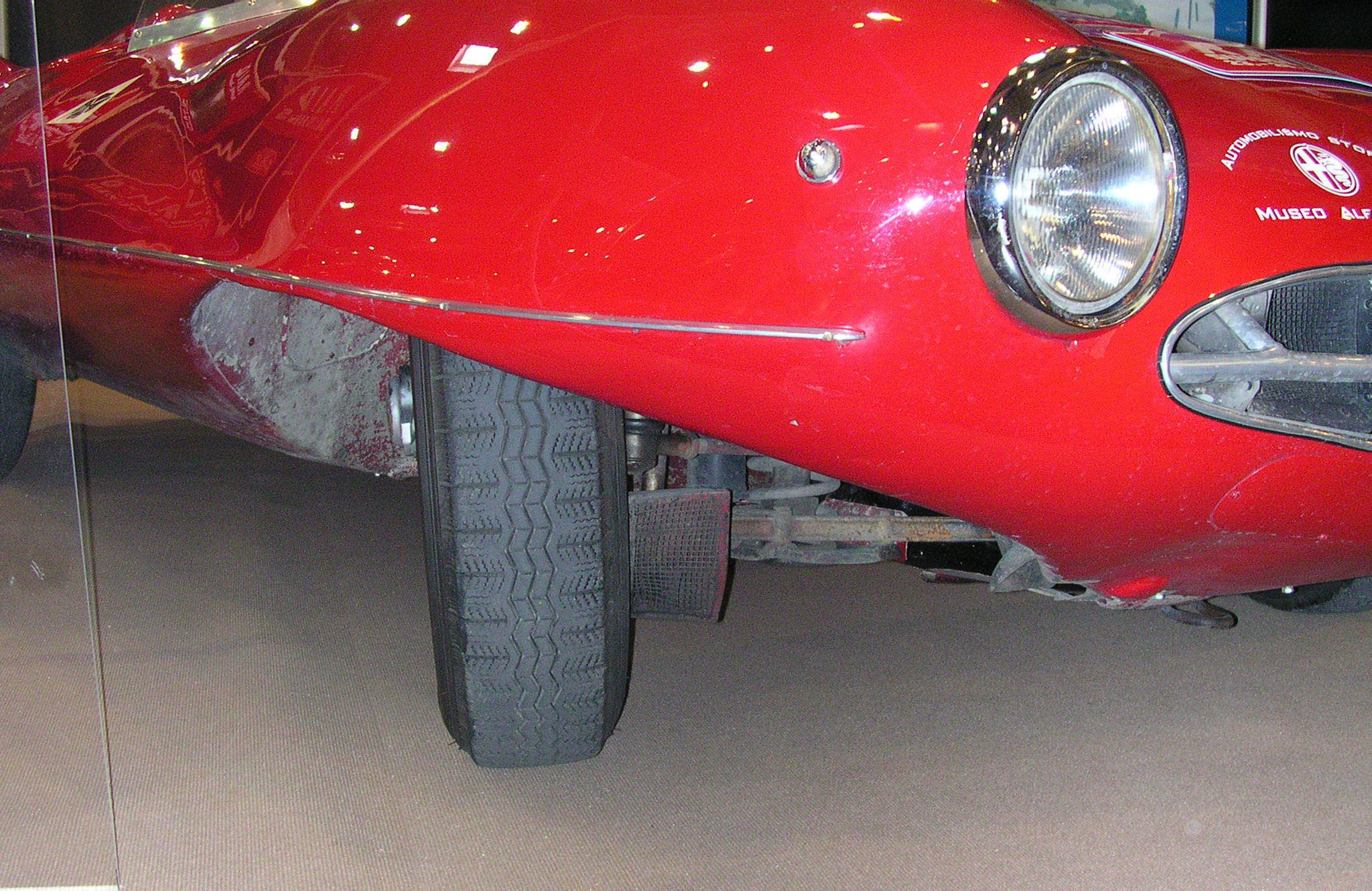
The Alfa Romeo Disco Volante has a pronounced turn under

Turn under
The shape of the rocker panel as it curves inward at the lower edge.

== W ==
Wedge

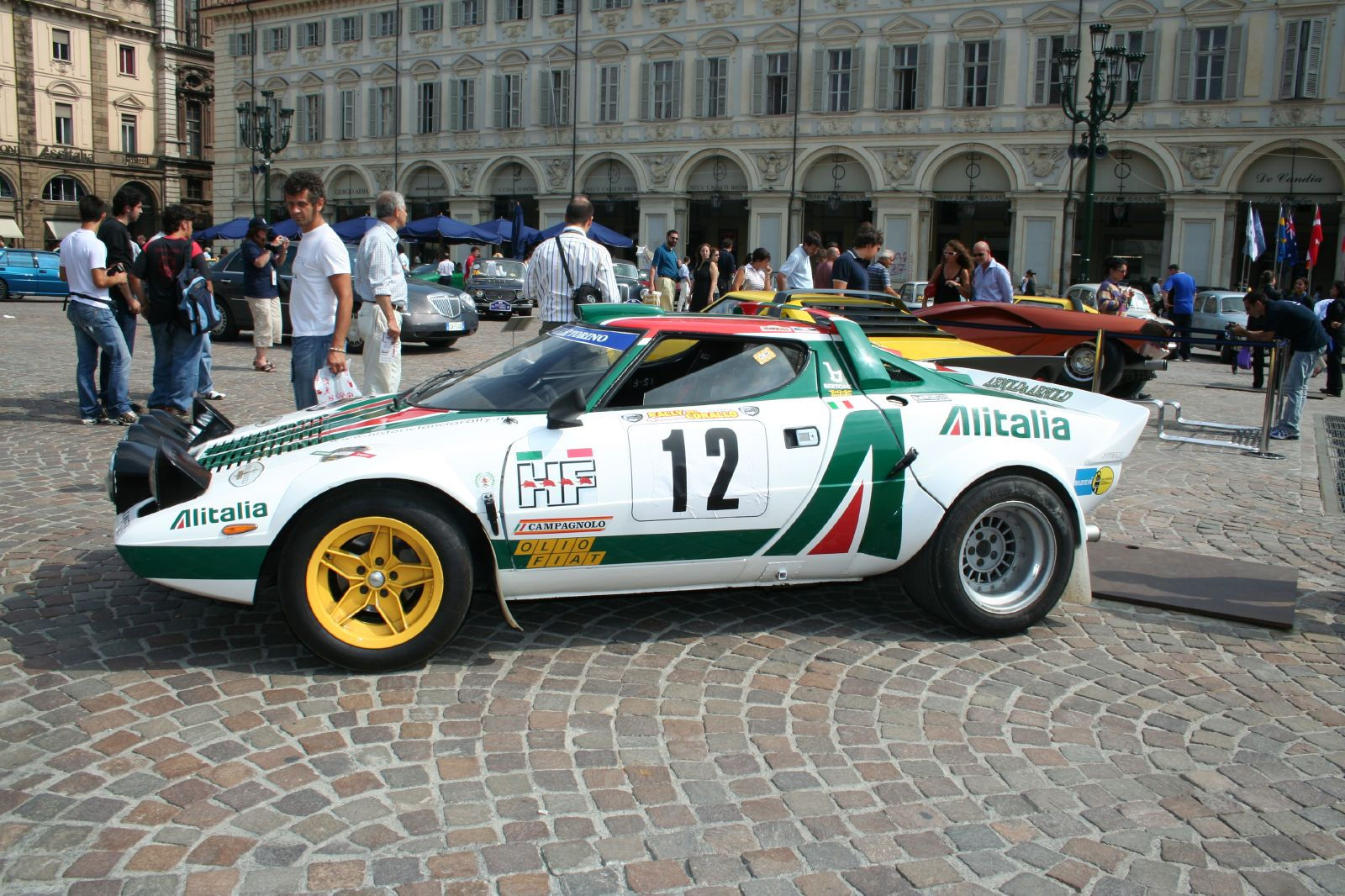
The Lancia Stratos HF is considered wedge-positive

Shape of the car as seen in the side profile. May be positive, negative or neutral. If the front is lower than the rear, then it is wedge-positive. If the rear is lower it is wedge-negative. If the car appears level from front to rear, then it is wedge neutral.

Wheel arch

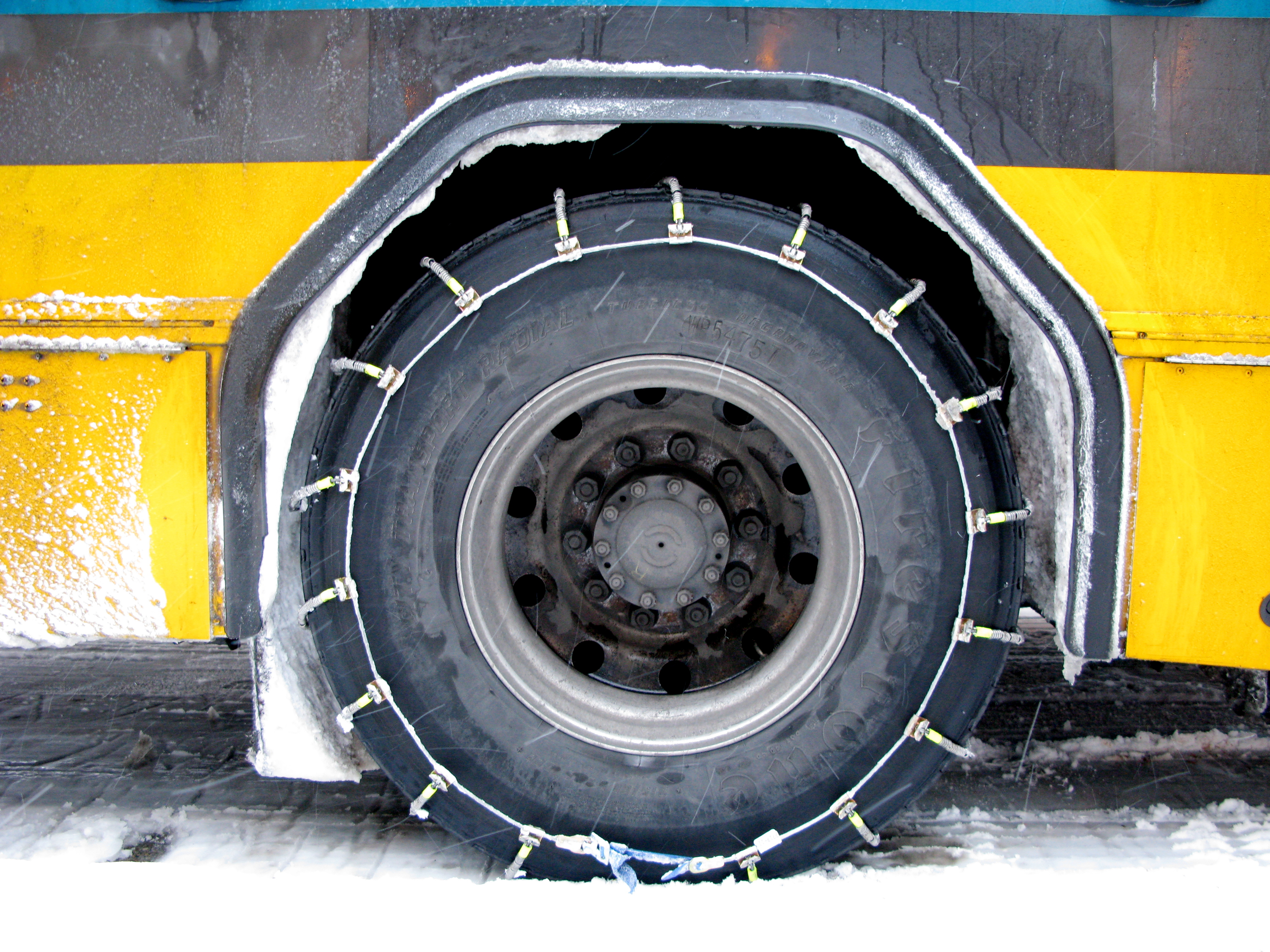
Gillig buses have an octagonal wheel arch as a signature styling detail

The visible opening in the side of a car allowing access to the wheel. In some cases, the wheel arch is covered with wheel spats for a more formal appearance or aerodynamic considerations.

Wheel arch gap

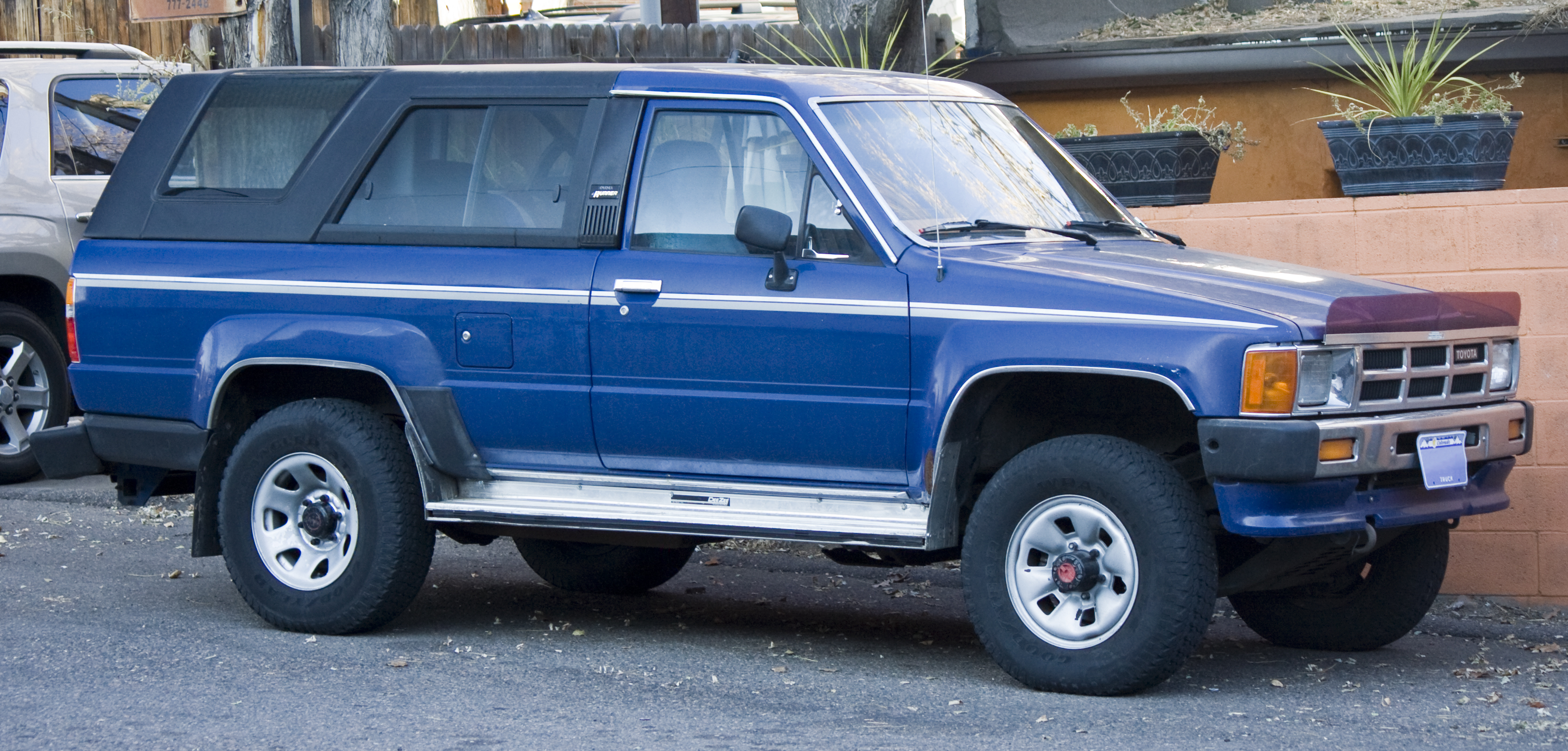
The wheel arch gap is pronounced on this Toyota 4Runner, to facilitate its intended off-road use

The space between the tire and the wheel well. Currently there is a trend towards smaller wheel arch gaps. Sometimes referred to as Dead Cat Space due to the fact that, in winter, many domestic cats try to seek shelter in wheel wells of recently parked cars in an attempt to stay warm.

Wheelbase

The wheelbase is measured from axle to axle

The distance measured along the vehicle's length between the centrelines of each axle, which may be approximated from where the front and rear wheels meet the ground. Cars have typical proportions that have a wheelbase of approximately three wheel diameters (±1/4) between the wheels, giving a wheelbase that is approximately four times the outer diameter of the wheel and tire.

Wheel well (also wheelhouse, wheelhousing, or bucket)

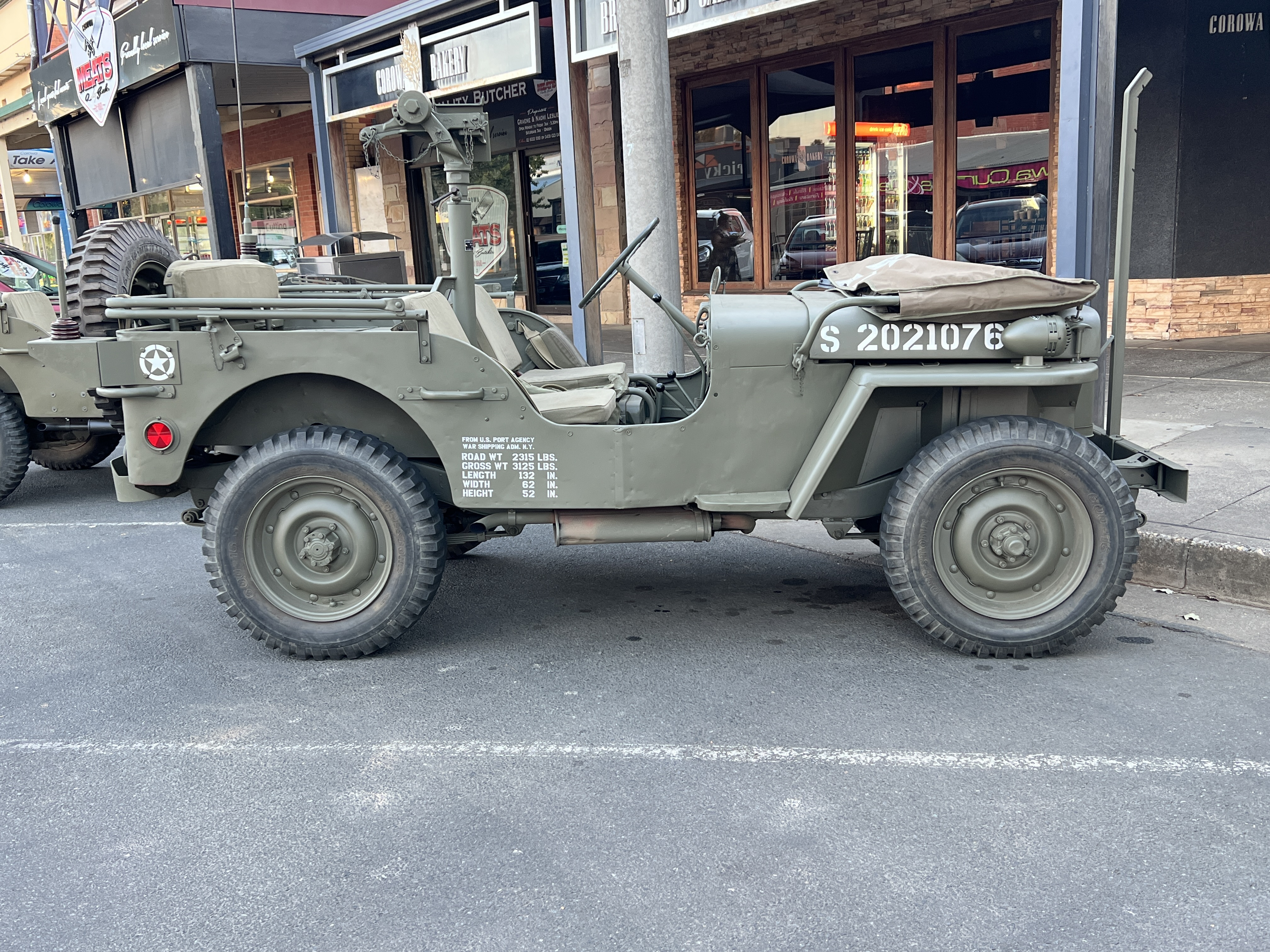
This Willys MB has a circular rear wheel well and an angled one for the front

The enclosure or space for the wheel.

Windshield trim

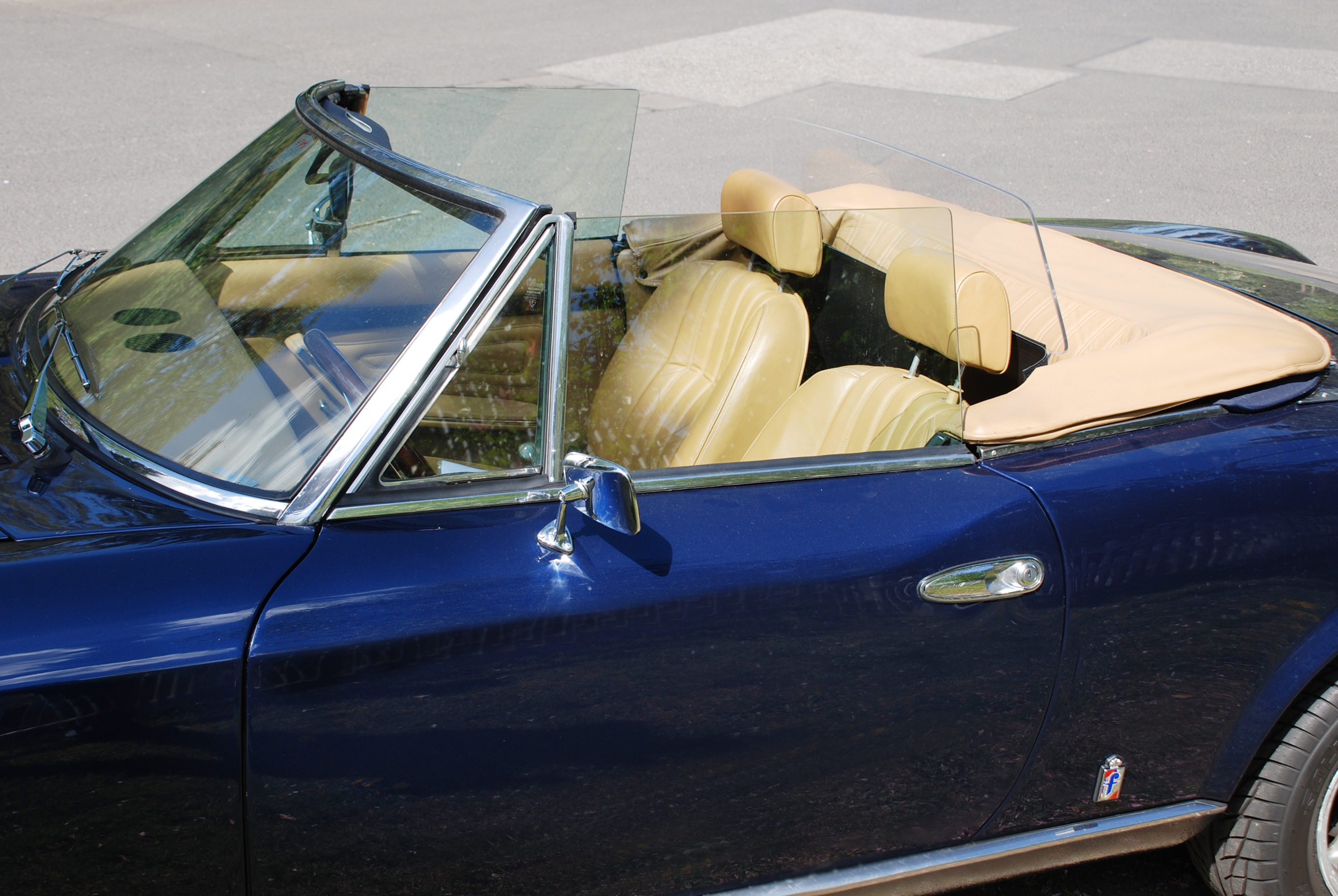
The Fiat 124 has chrome windshield trim

US DOT Term: Molding of any material between the windshield glazing and the exterior roof surface, including material that covers a part of either the windshield glazing or exterior roof surface.

Wings

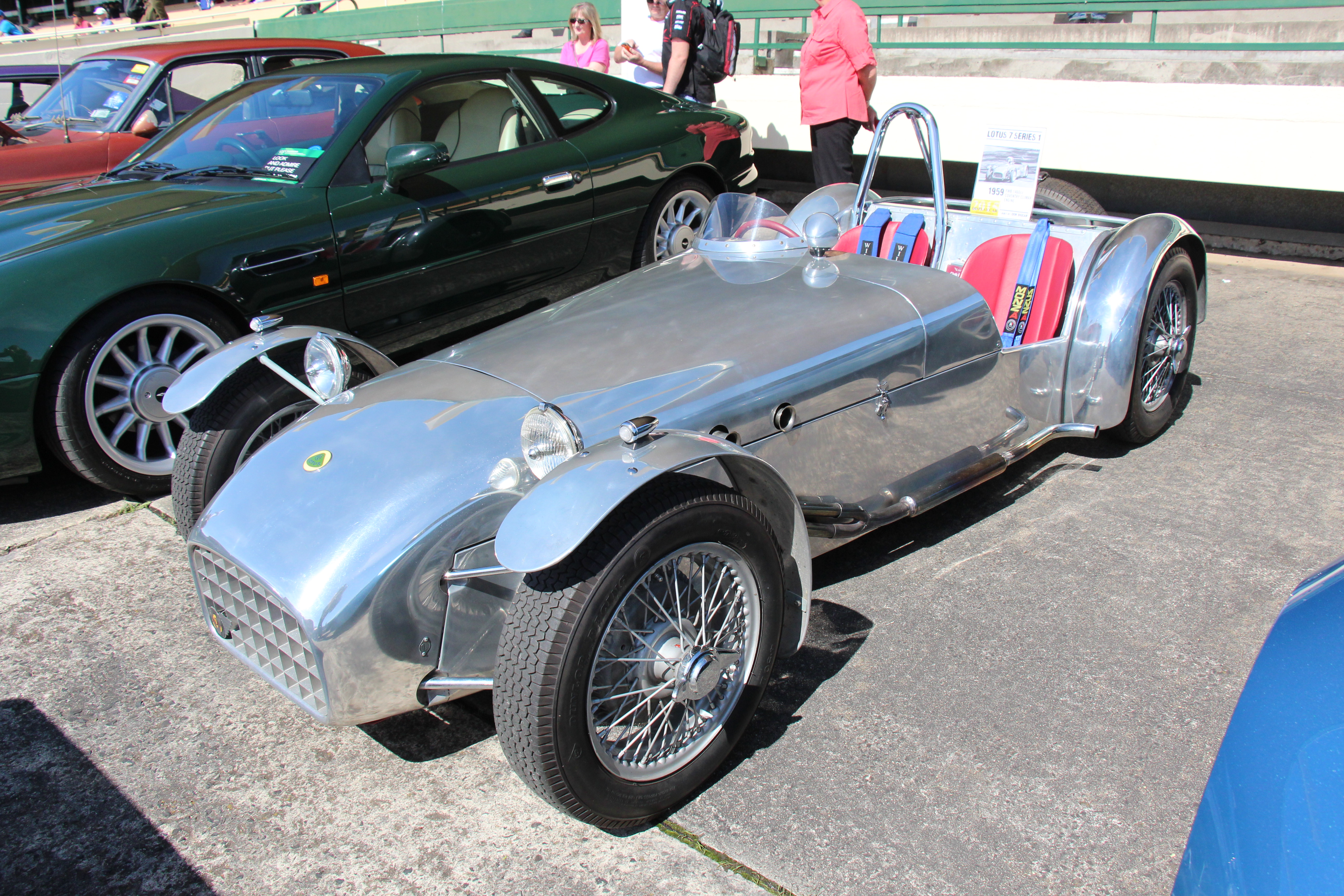
The Lotus Seven series of cars has front wings that are not integrated into the body

UK term for § Fender.

== See also ==
- Car body style
- Car classification
- Glossary of mechanical engineering
