= BMW 1600 =

The term BMW 1600 may refer to:

- an automobile produced as part of the BMW New Class range (1964–1966)
- an automobile produced as part of the BMW 02 Series (1966–1975)
