= Hofmeister kink =

Automotive design feature

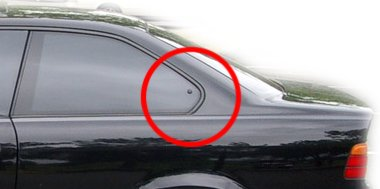
Hofmeister kink on a BMW E36 car

The Hofmeister kink (German: Hofmeister-Knick) is an automotive design feature consisting of a rearward/forward angle near the base of the rearmost pillar. It is named for Wilhelm Hofmeister, who was BMW's design chief from 1955 to 1970, though it appeared on other-brand cars made before Hofmeister's tenure at BMW.

Among the first cars to feature this design element were some 1949-model 2-door cars made by General Motors, including the Cadillac Club Coupe, Buick Sedanette, and Chevrolet Fleetline (Buick and Oldsmobile had similar body styles), as well as the 1958 Lancia Flaminia Sport Zagato and the 1961 Lancia Flavia Coupé.

The first BMWs to feature it were the BMW 3200 CS and the BMW 1500 shown at the Frankfurt Motor Show in September 1961 and was later named after then-BMW director of design, Wilhelm Hofmeister.

Although the Hofmeister kink is commonly associated with BMW vehicles, similar C-pillar kinks have appeared on cars of numerous brands for many years. The 1951 Kaiser shows a prominent Hofmeister kink. A Hofmeister kink can be seen on the Volkswagen Golf Mk1 of 1974, the Series II Fiat 127 of 1977, and the 1994 Chevrolet Impala SS.

== Gallery ==
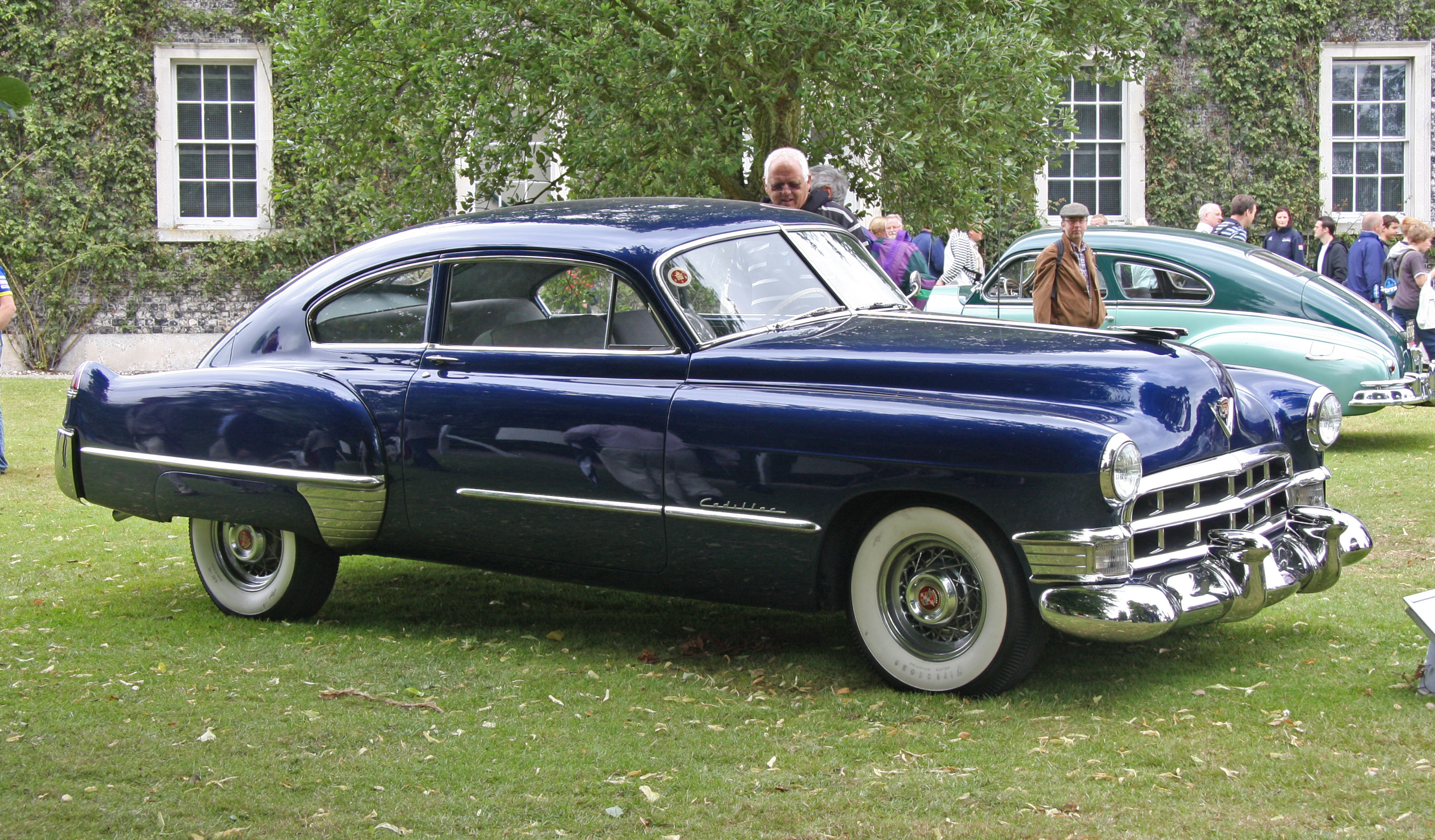
1949 Cadillac Series 61 fastback coupé

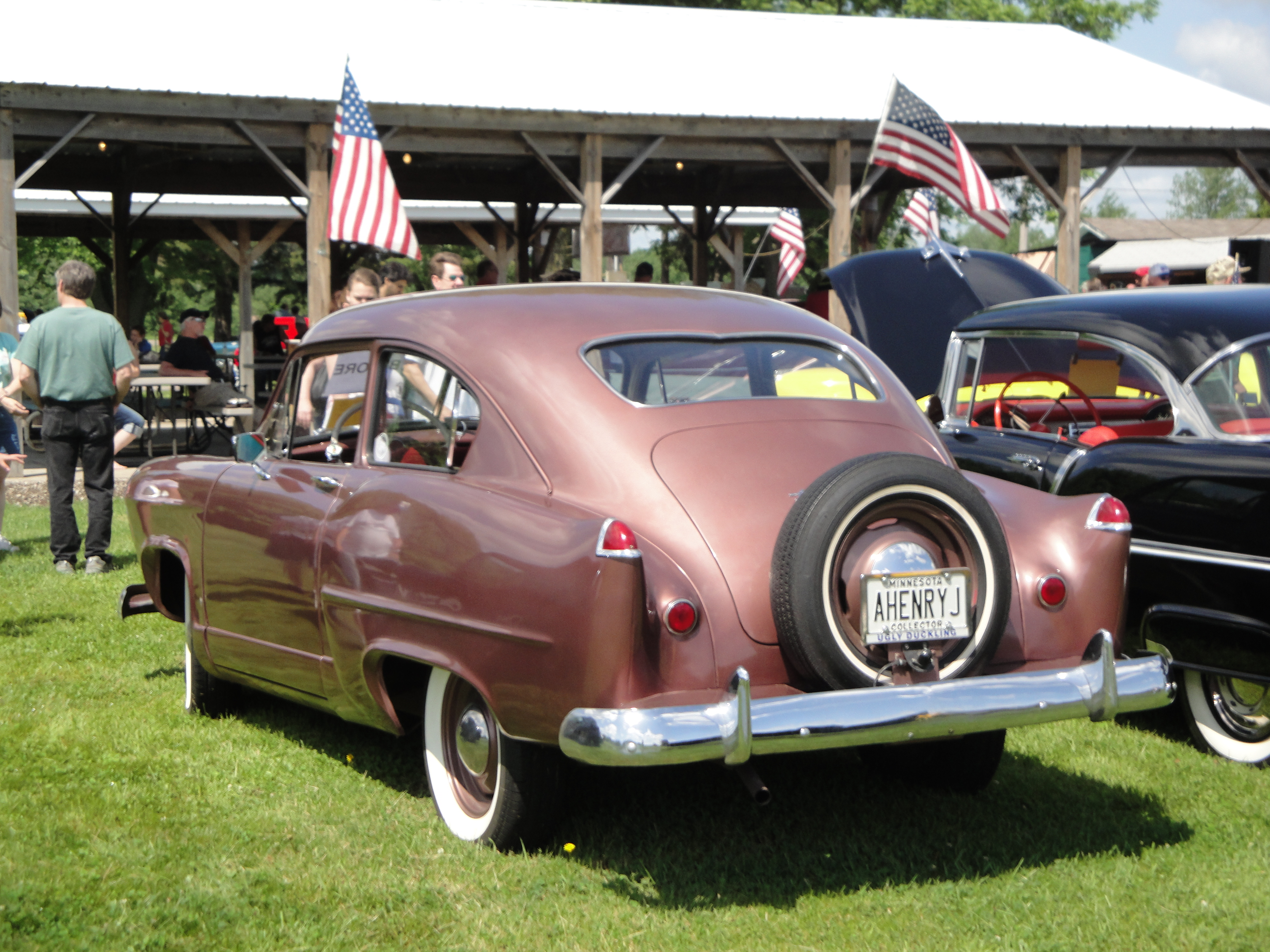
1951 Henry J

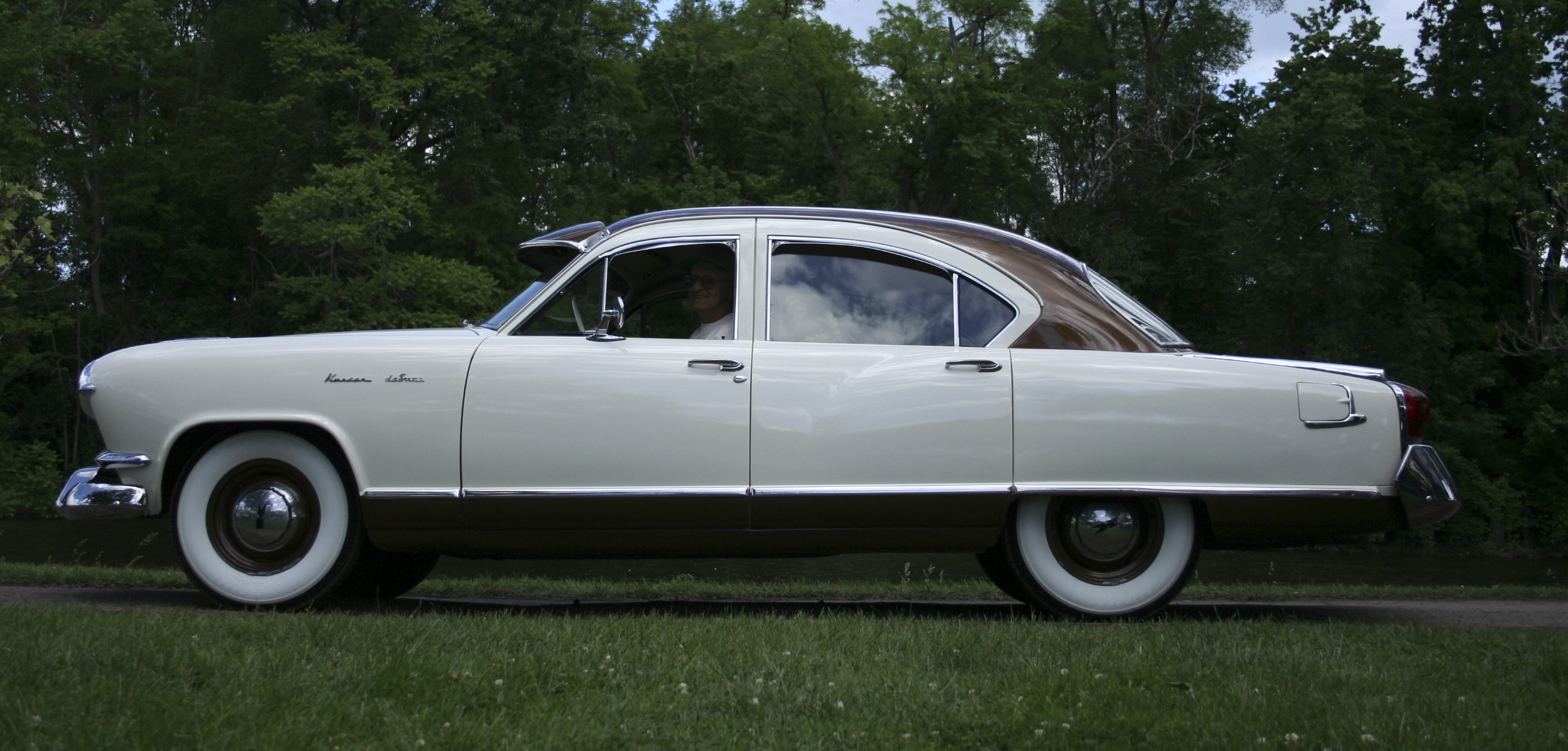
1953 Kaiser-Frazer

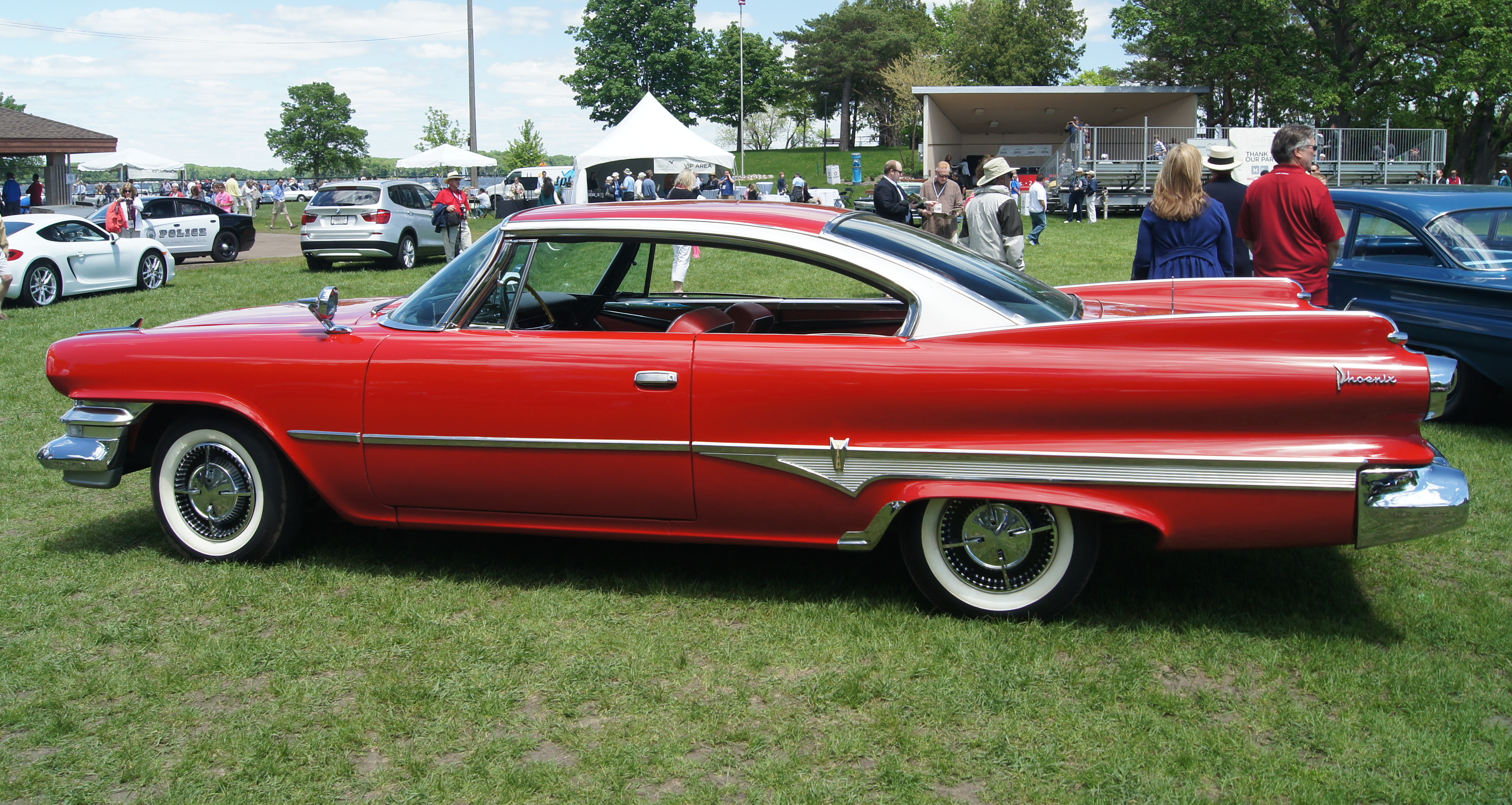
1960 Dodge Dart Phoenix Hardtop-Coupé

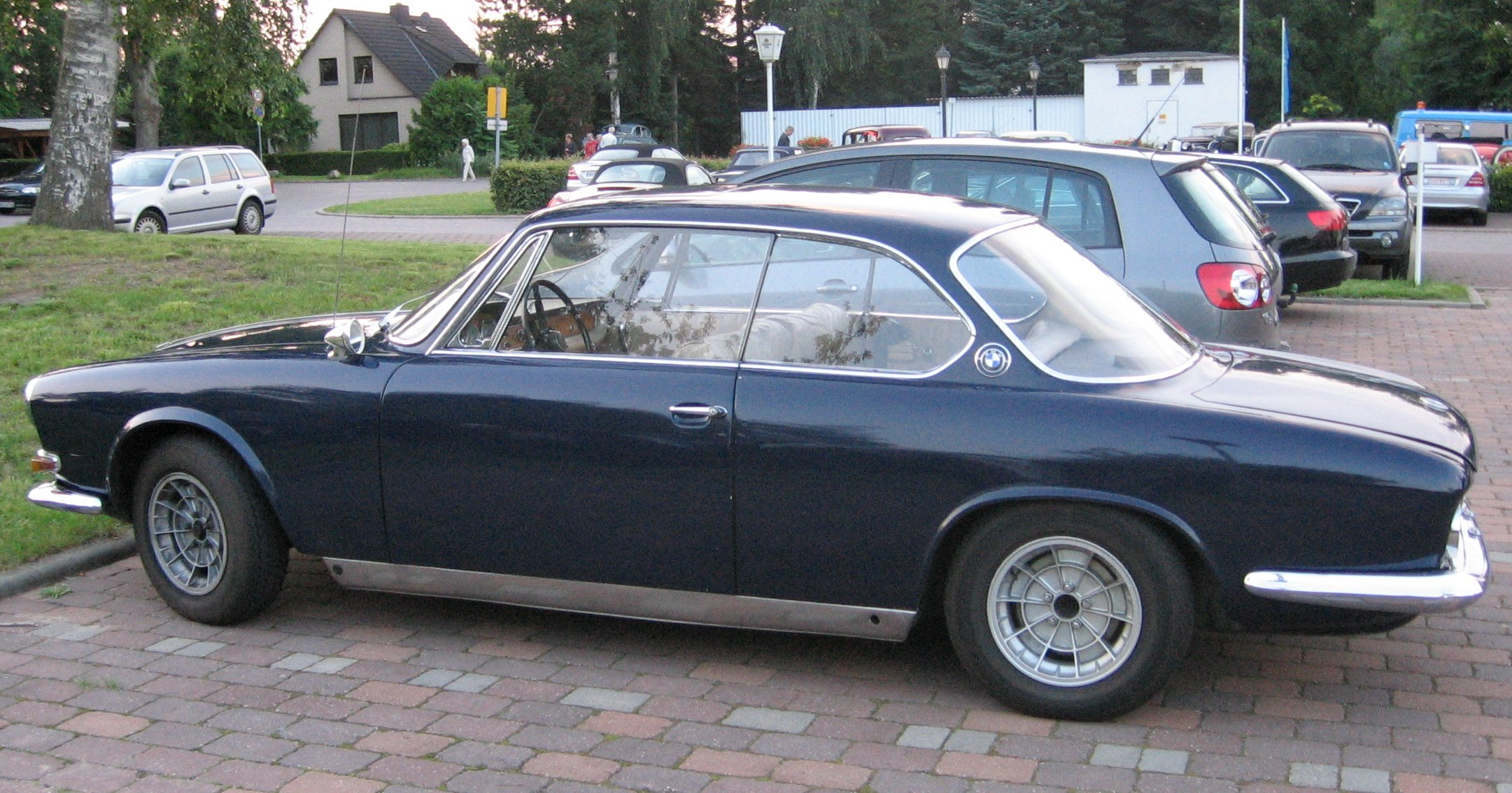
In some earlier models like this BMW 3200 CS, the widened base of the C-pillar was adorned with the BMW roundel.

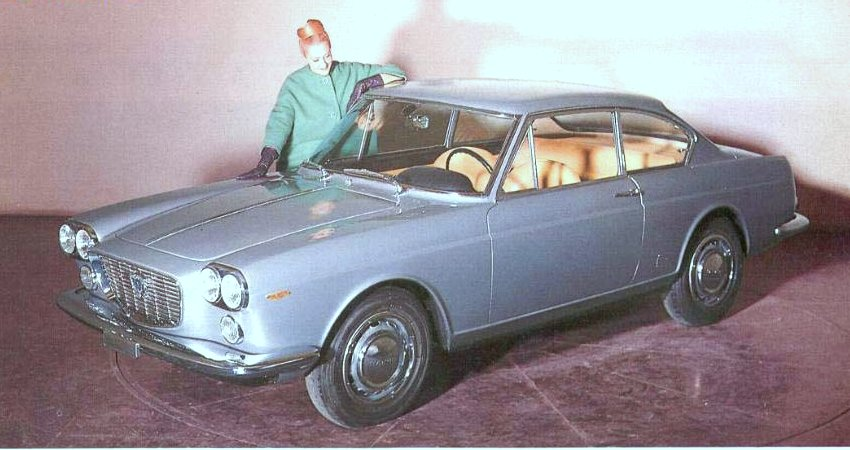
Lancia Flavia coupè

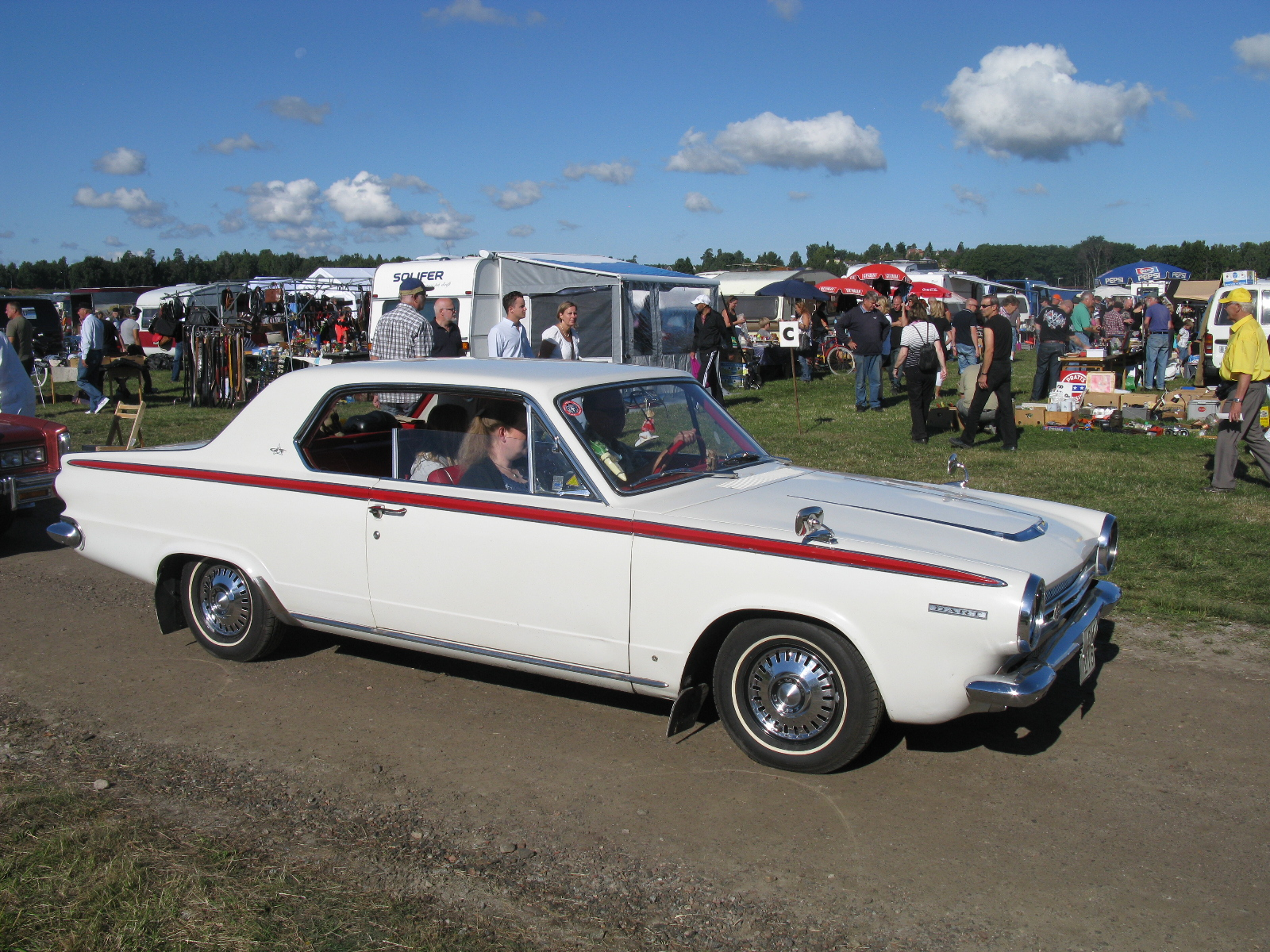
1964 Dodge Dart

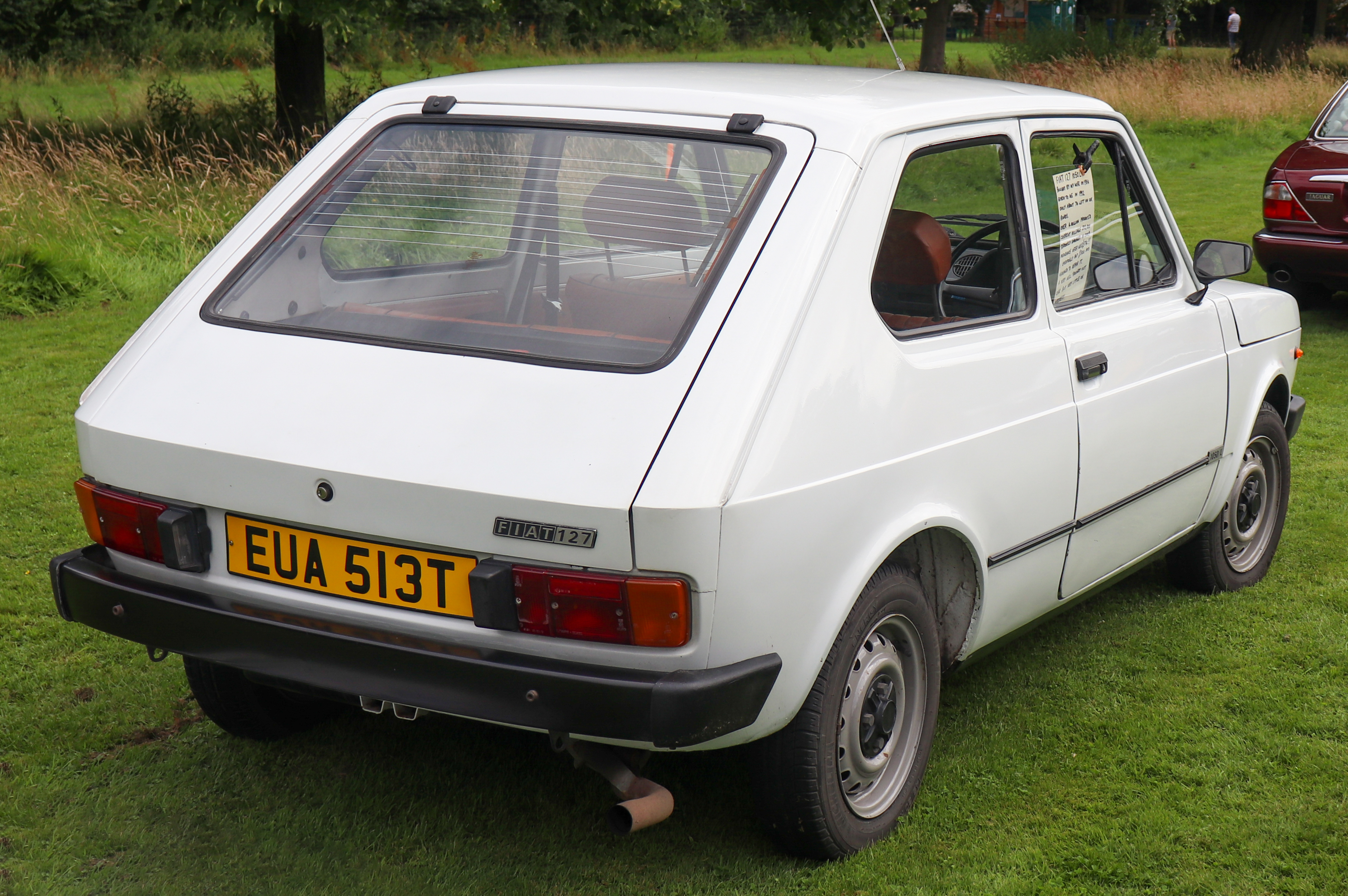
Fiat 127 Series 2 (1977)

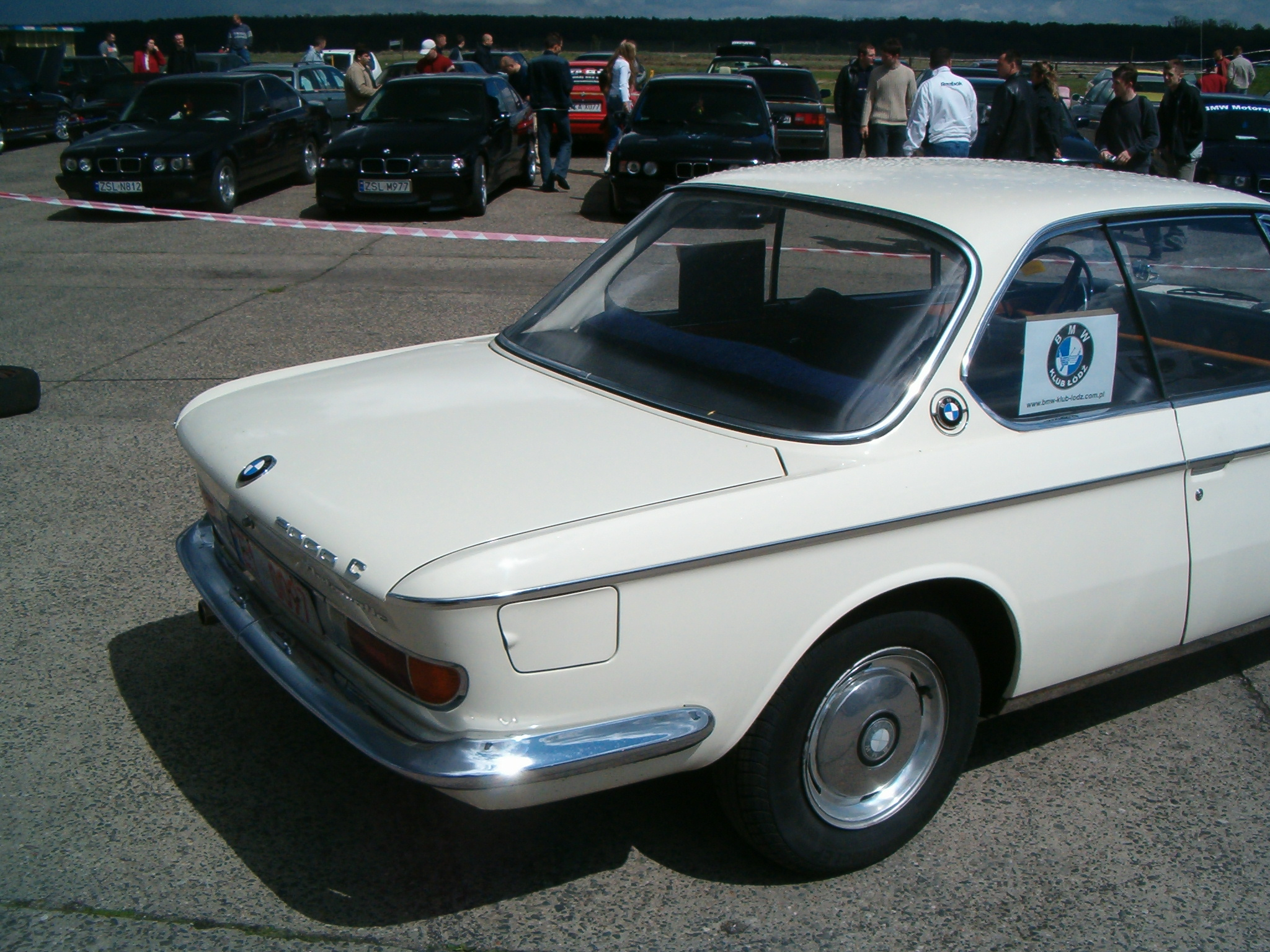
BMW 2000 CS

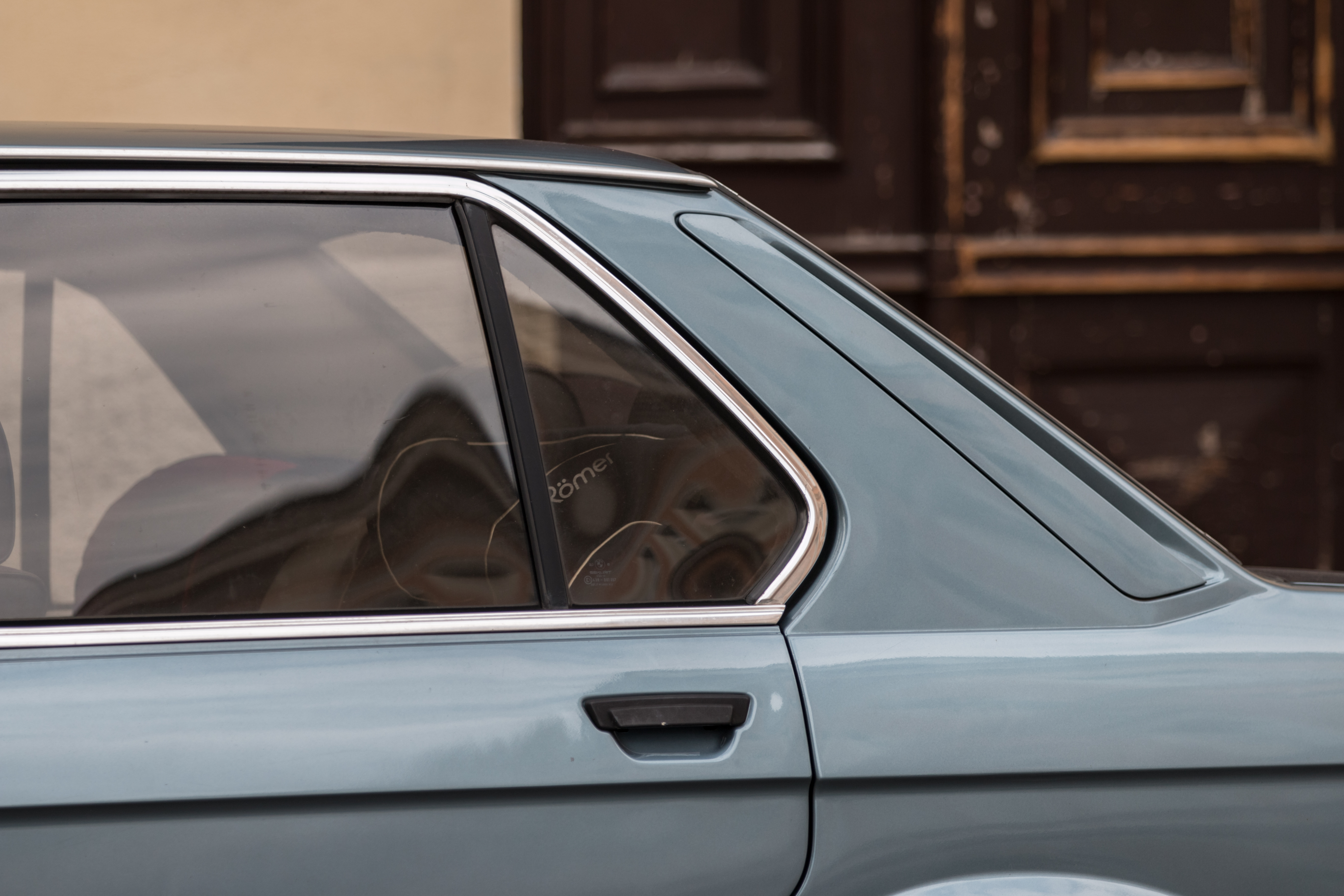
BMW E28

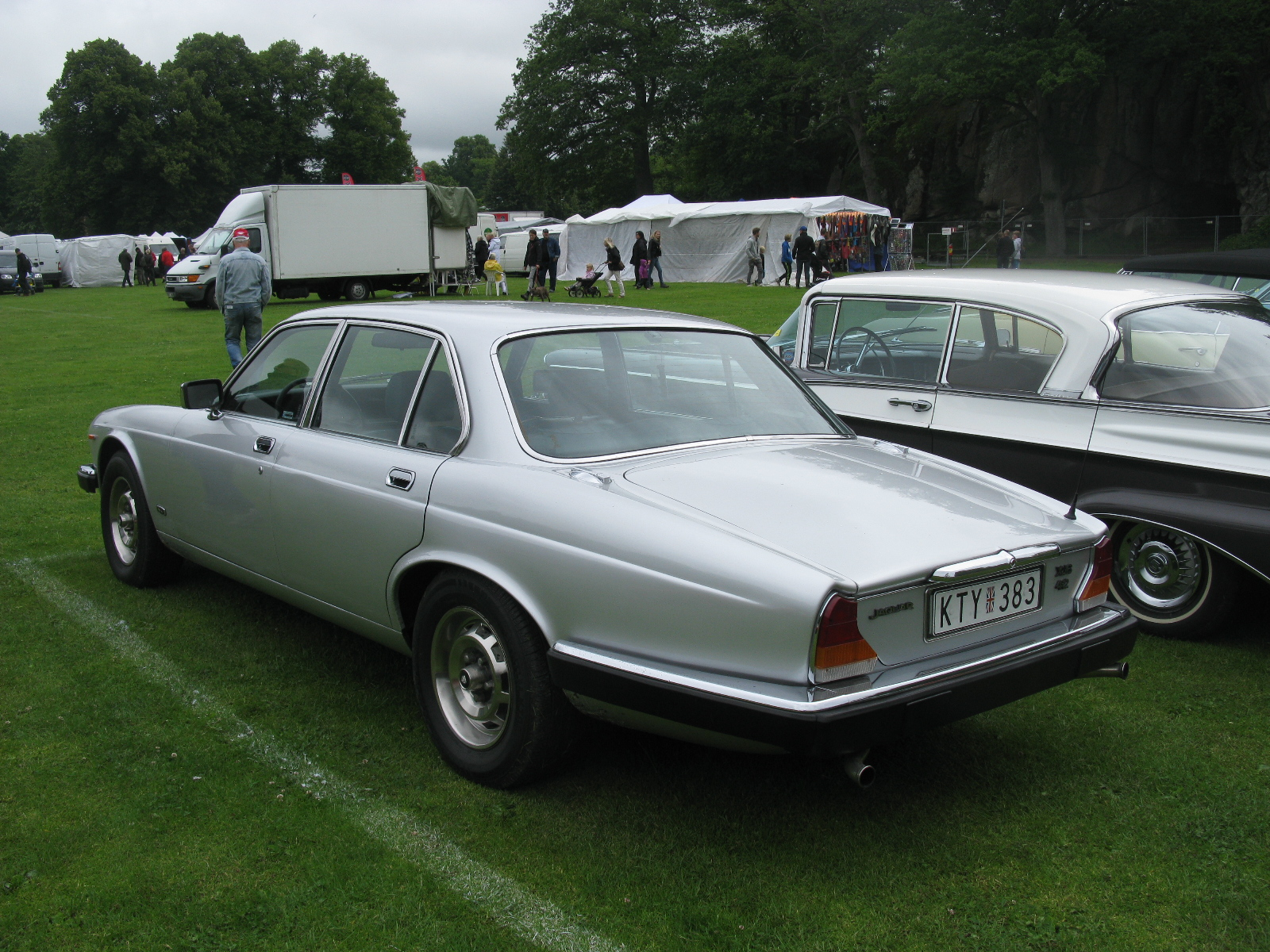
Jaguar XJ Series III

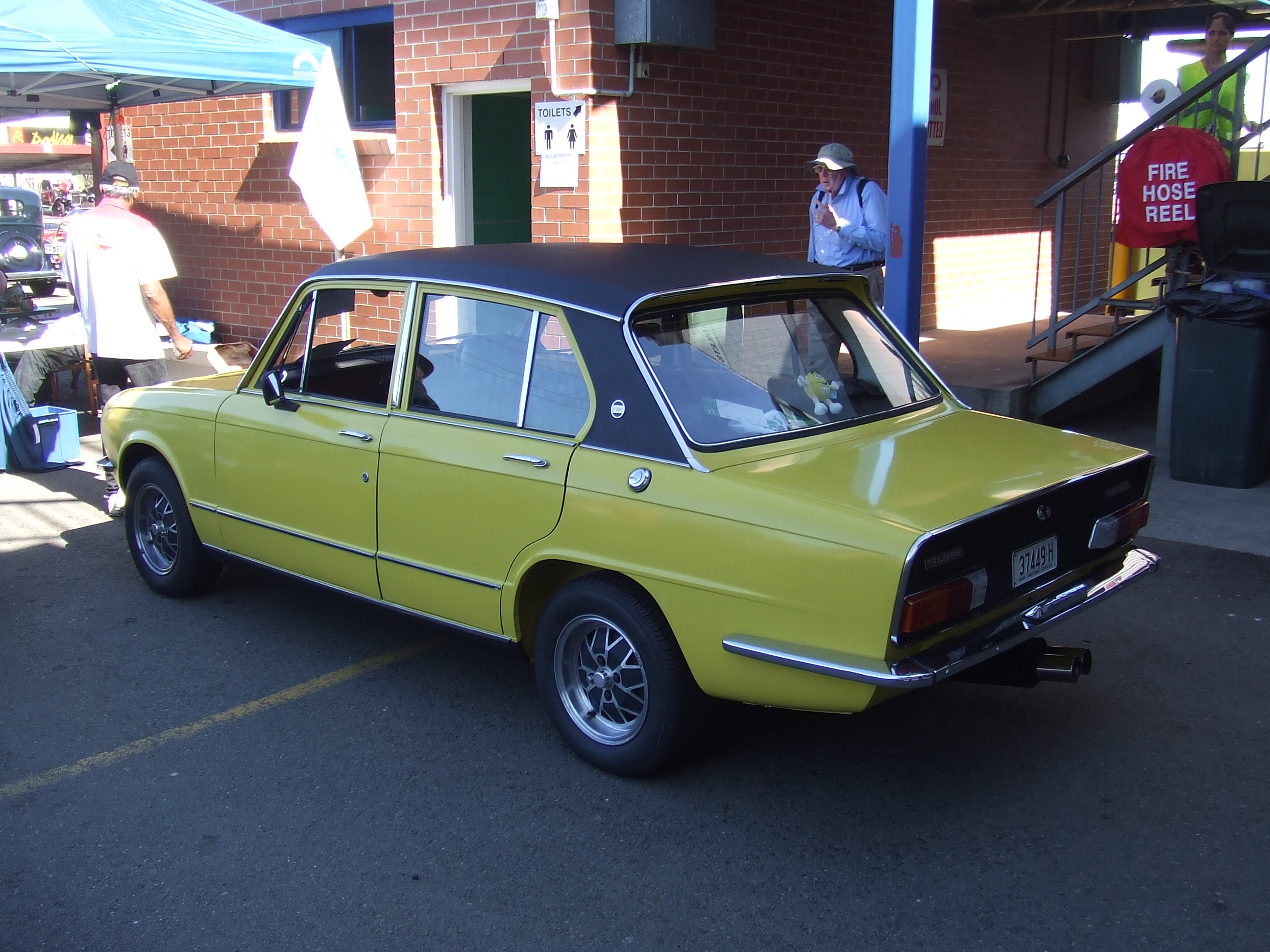
1973 Triumph Dolomite Sprint

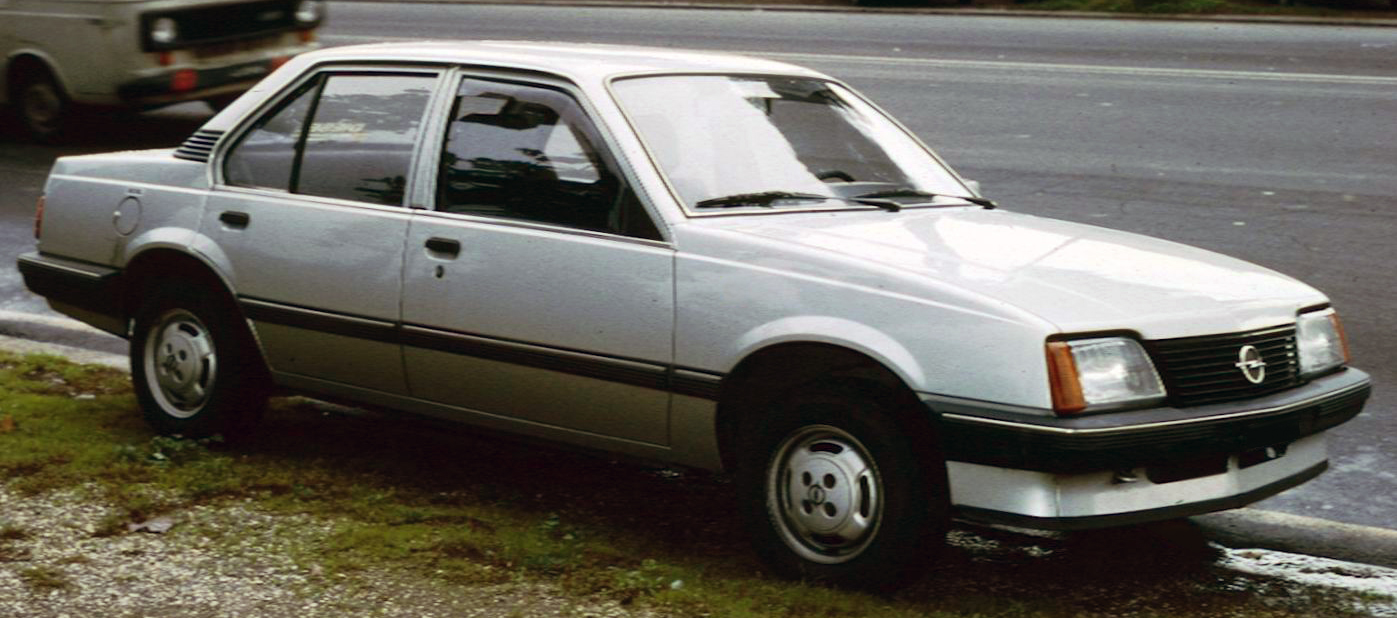
Opel Ascona C/Vauxhall Cavalier II

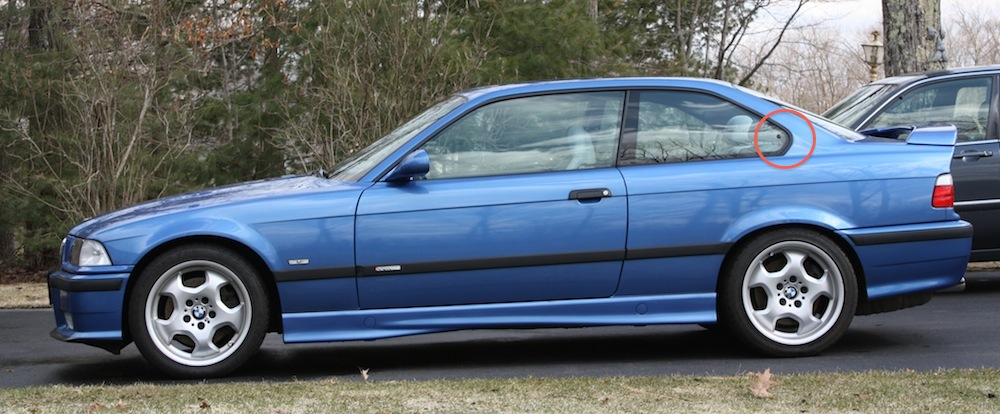
Hofmeister kink on an E36 M3

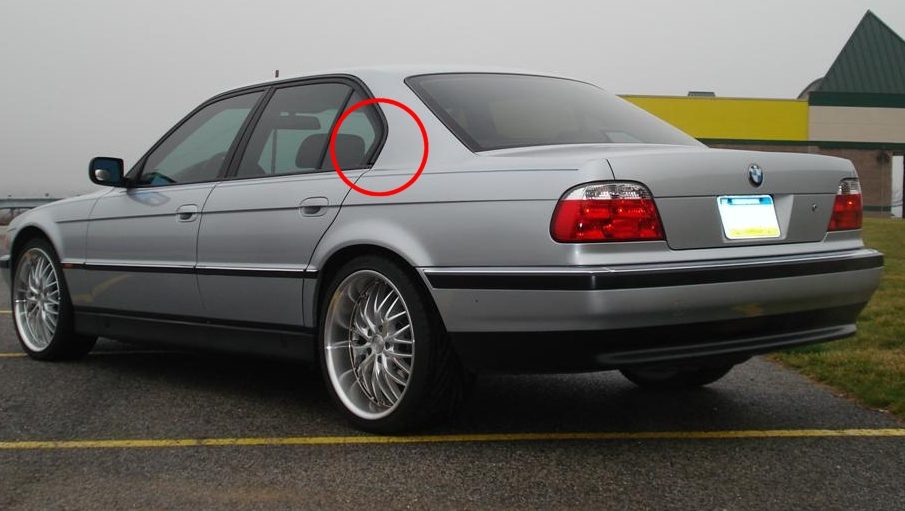
E38 740i

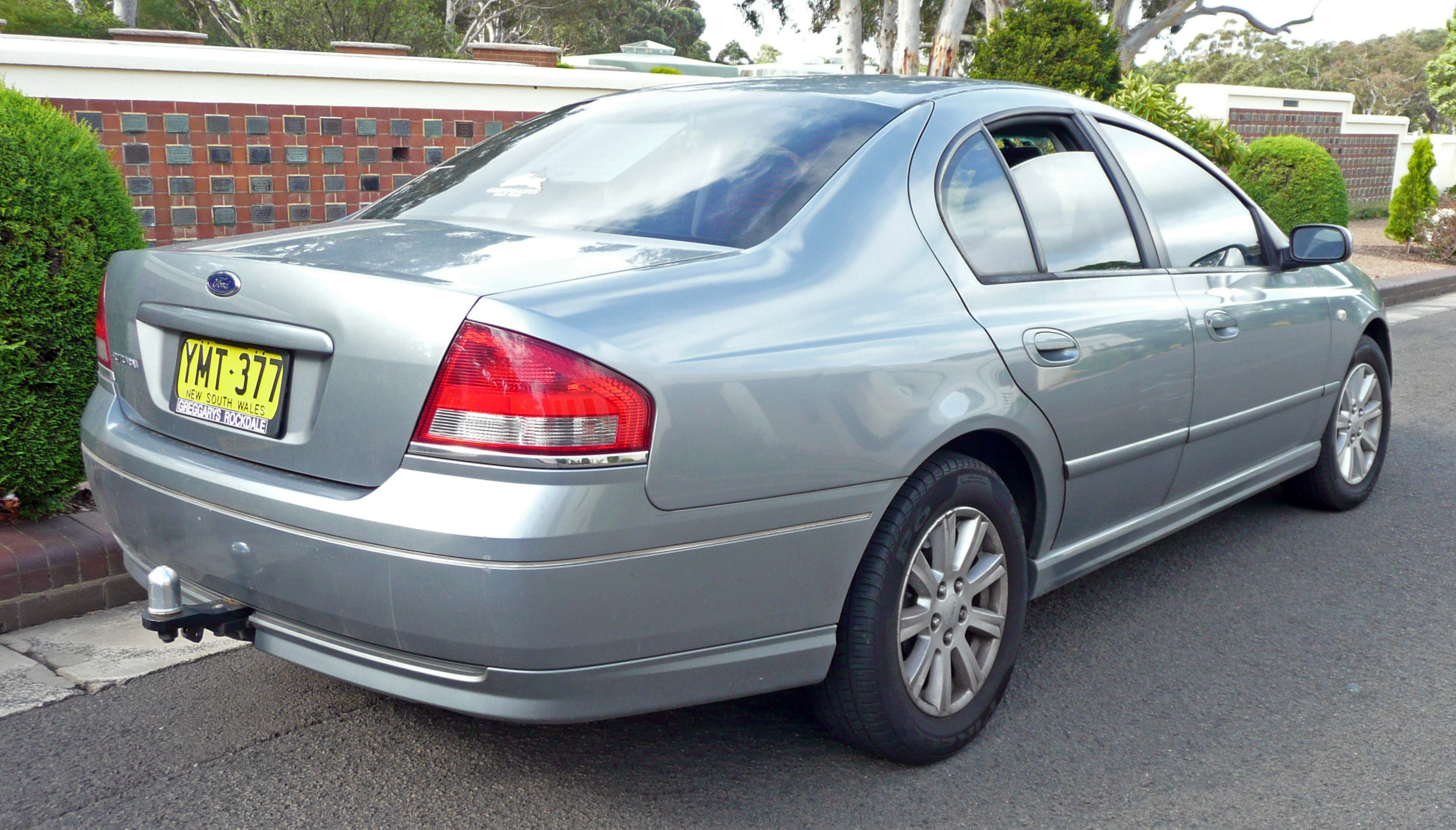
Australian Ford BA Falcon

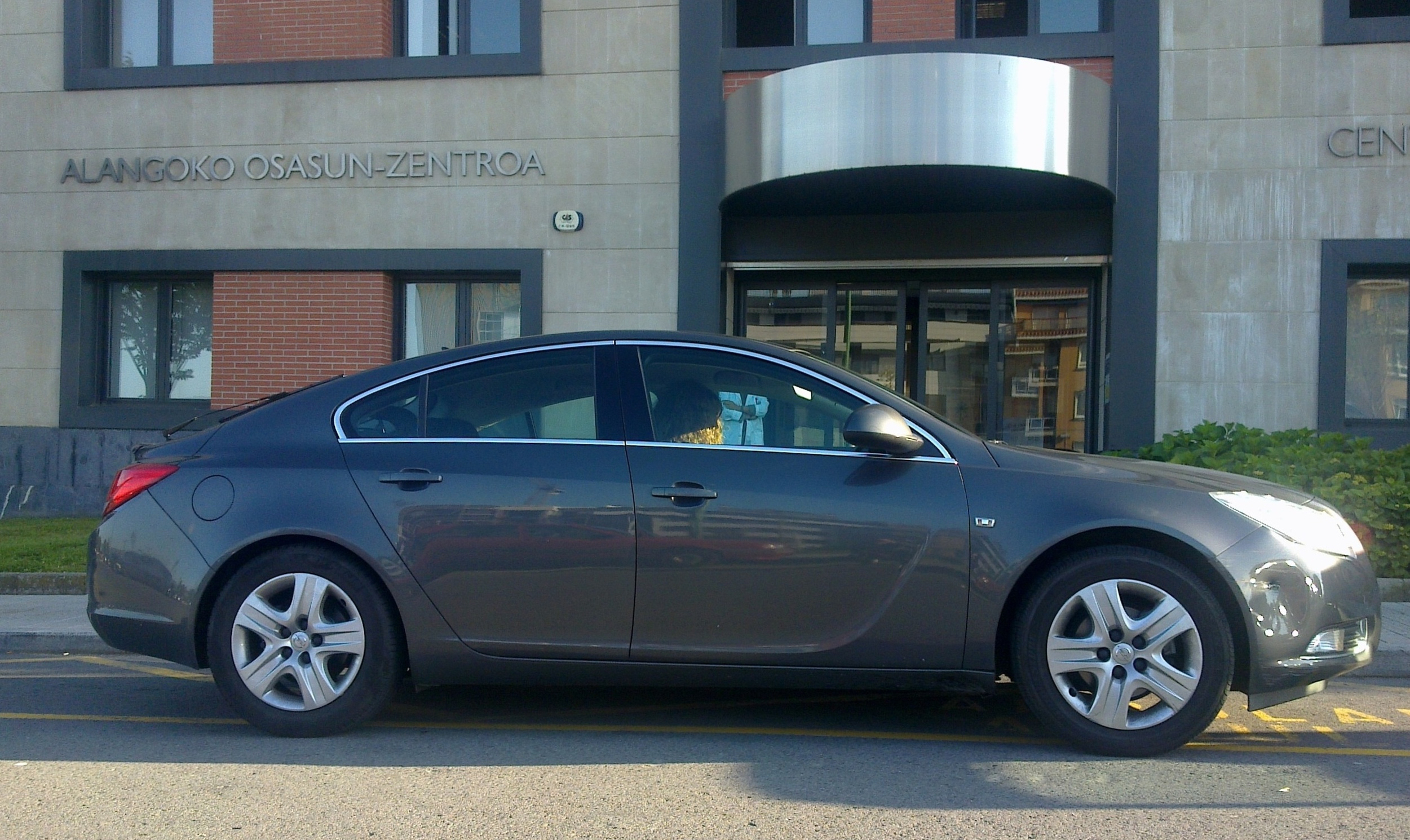
Opel Insignia A, 2008–2013

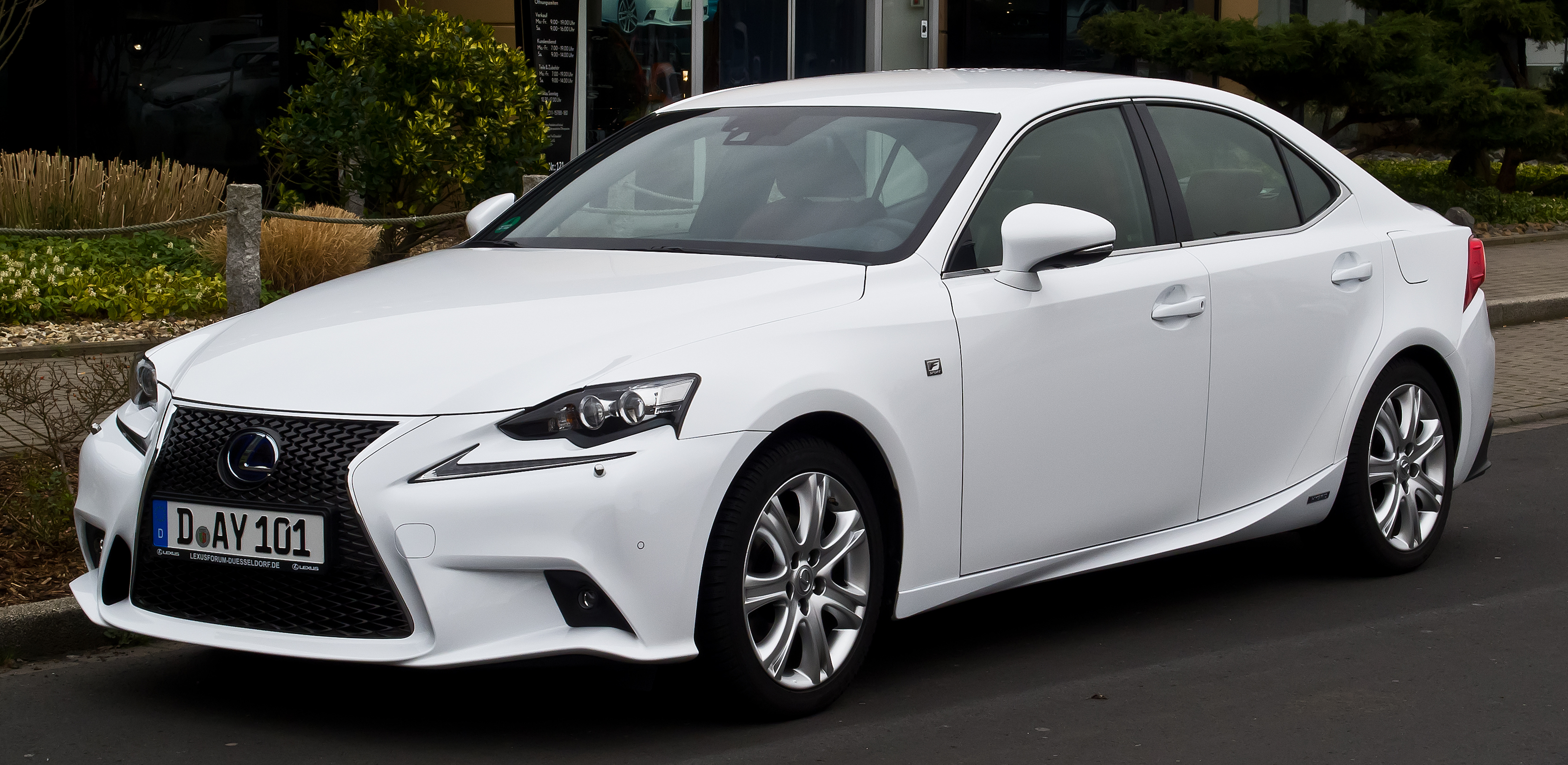
2014 Lexus IS 300h

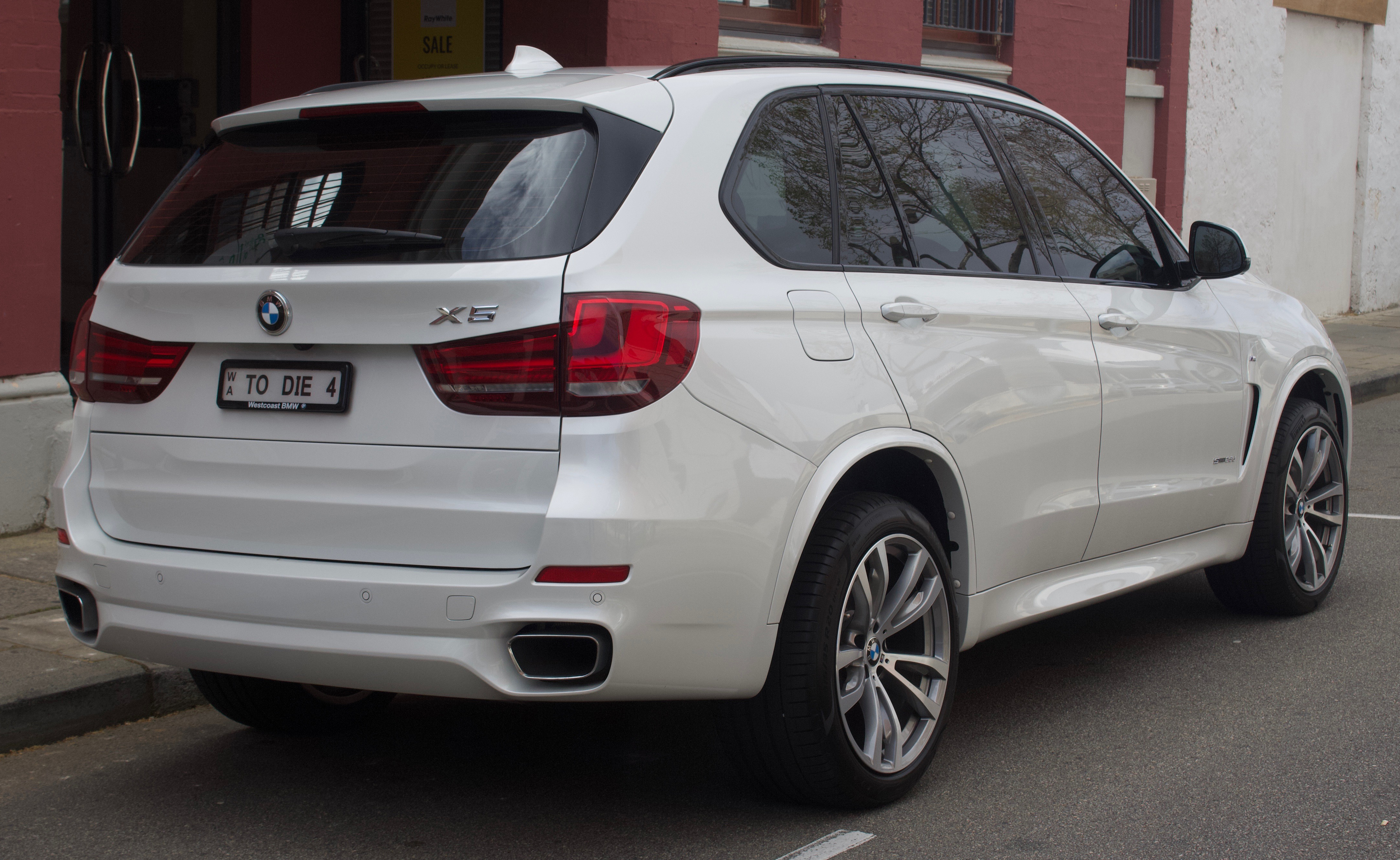
F15 BMW X5.

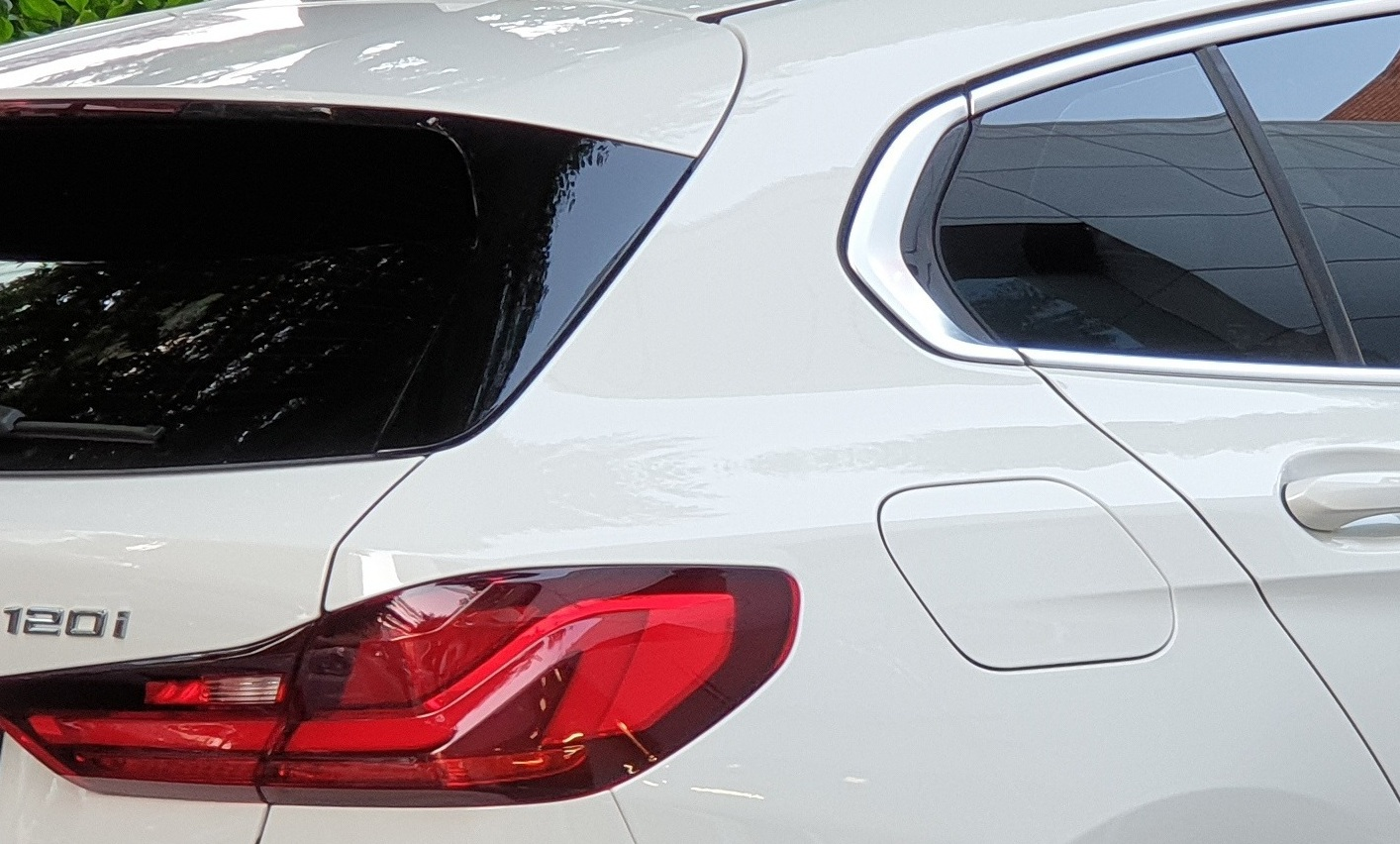
2019 F40 BMW 1 Series

== See also ==
- Saab hockey stick - a similar design element on Saab automobiles.
