= Wilhelm Hofmeister (automobile designer) =

German automobile designer (1912–1978)

Wilhelm Hofmeister (1912–1978) was the BMW design chief from 1955 to 1970.

Trained as an engineer at the Hamburg Wagenbauschule, he was more a skillful manager than a stylist. He is credited with the design of the BMW New Class and the Hofmeister kink is named after him.

Hofmeister's predecessor at BMW was Peter Szymanowski and his successor was Paul Bracq.
