= BMW New Class =

Line of BMW automobiles

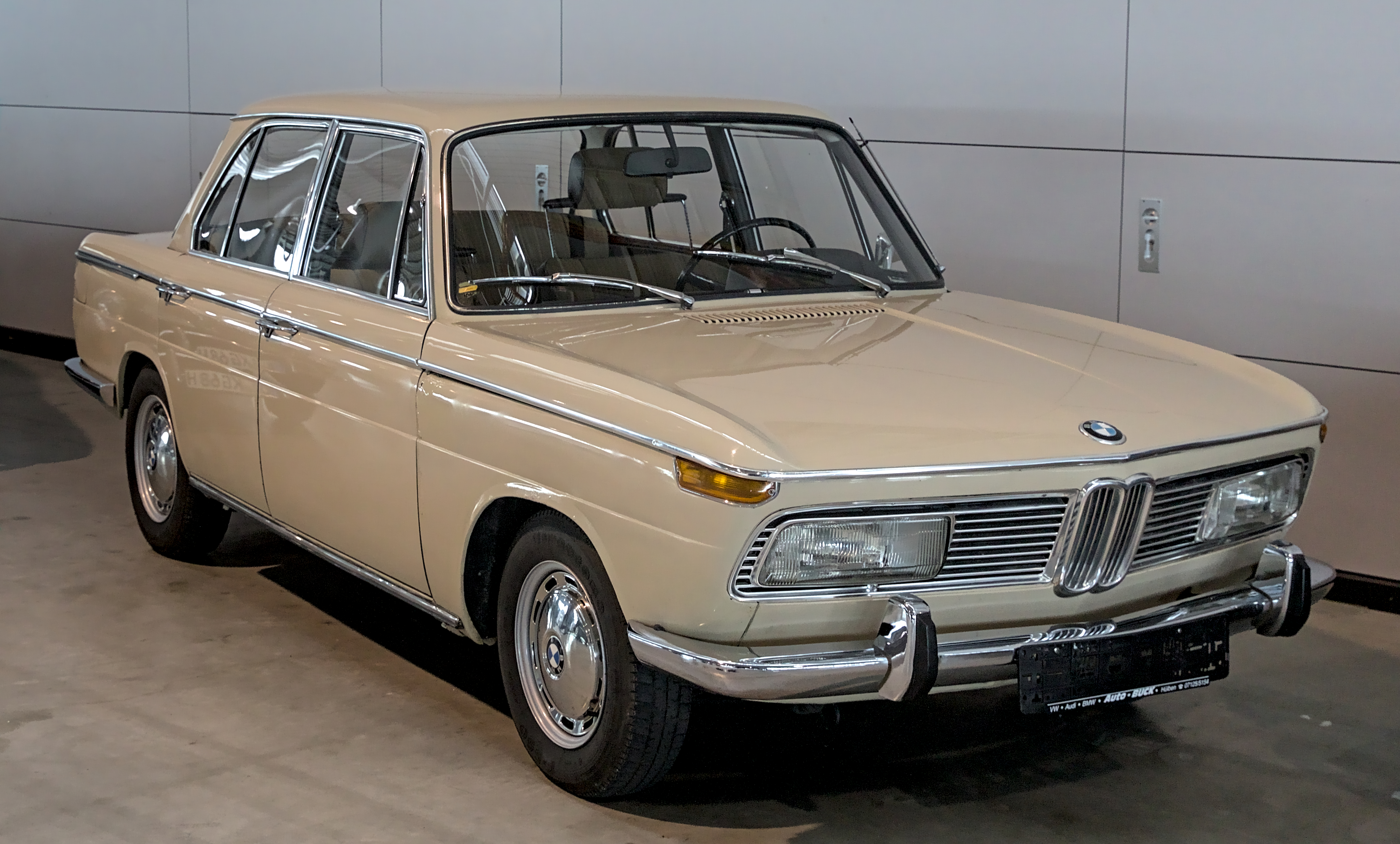
- BMW 2000

Overview
- Manufacturer: BMW
- Production: 1962–1972
- Assembly: West Germany: Munich; Indonesia: Jakarta (Gaya Motor)
- Designer: Wilhelm Hofmeister

Body and chassis
- Body style: 4-door sedan 2-door GT coupe
- Layout: FR layout
- Related: BMW 02 Series

Powertrain
- Engine: 1.5-2.0 L M10 4-cyl

Chronology
- Successor: BMW 5 Series for sedans BMW E9 for coupes

The BMW New Class (German: Neue Klasse) is a line of sedans and coupes produced by West German automaker BMW between 1962 and 1972. These models ensured BMW's solvency after the company's financial crisis of the 1950s and again established the identity of BMW automobiles as luxury sports sedans.

The first New Class vehicle was the 1500, a 4-door compact executive car with the new M10 (at the time called M115) OHC 4-cylinder engine. In 1965, the 2000 C and 2000 CS luxury coupés were added to the range.

Replacement of the New Class models began with the 6-cylinder E9 2800 CS in 1969 replacing the 2000 C and 2000 CS coupés. In 1972 the 4-door sedans were replaced by the larger E12 5 Series.

The New Class coupes introduced the Hofmeister kink, which has been used on most BMW cars since. Another legacy of the New Class is the iconic 02 Series, which are a shortened version of the New Class sedans.

== Overview ==
=== Background ===
During the 1950s, the BMW line-up consisted of luxury cars with displacements of two litres or greater, economy cars powered by motorcycle engines, and motorcycles. With their luxury cars becoming increasingly outdated and unprofitable and their motorcycles and economy cars becoming less attractive to an increasingly affluent society, BMW needed a car in the 1.5 to 2 litre class to become competitive. Prototypes powered by a 1.6 L engine based on one bank of the BMW OHV V8 engine were built and evaluated without a convincing result.

In 1960, Herbert and Harald Quandt invested heavily in BMW, and gained a controlling interest in the company. That year, the "Neue Klasse" project was begun. Led overall by Fritz Fiedler, the project had Eberhard Wolff in charge of chassis design, Wilhelm Hofmeister in charge of styling and body engineering, and Alex von Falkenhausen in charge of engine design. The team was to produce a new car with a new engine, which BMW had not done since the 303 in 1933.

The prototype was introduced in September 1961 at the Frankfurt Motor Show as the BMW 1500 four-door saloon, alongside the BMW 3200 CS, the last BMW with the OHV V8.

The term New Class referred to the 1.5–2–liter class of automobiles from which BMW had been absent since World War II.

The car benefitted from meeting demand for the Borgward Isabella as Borgward had entered liquidation the year before.

=== Chassis and body ===
The three-box four-door saloon was in many ways conventional, using a unitary structure and MacPherson strut front suspension which were becoming mainstream by the time of the 1500's introduction. Less conventional was the independent rear suspension, which featured coil springs and semi-trailing wishbones pivoted from a stout cross beam that also supported the differential housing. While BMW was using MacPherson struts for their first time on the New Class, they had used unit body construction on the 700 and semi-trailing arm rear suspension on the 600 and the 700. All New Class cars had front disc brakes.

=== Engines ===
The M10 overhead camshaft engine used in the New Class was required to displace 1.5 L initially, with the possibility to be expanded to 1.8 L. Von Falkenhausen had earlier designed an engine prototype for possible use in the BMW 700 and used this as a starting point for the M10. The engine was canted over at 30 degrees to the right of vertical in order to allow for the low bonnet line, which also contributed to the styling of the car.

=== Financial results ===
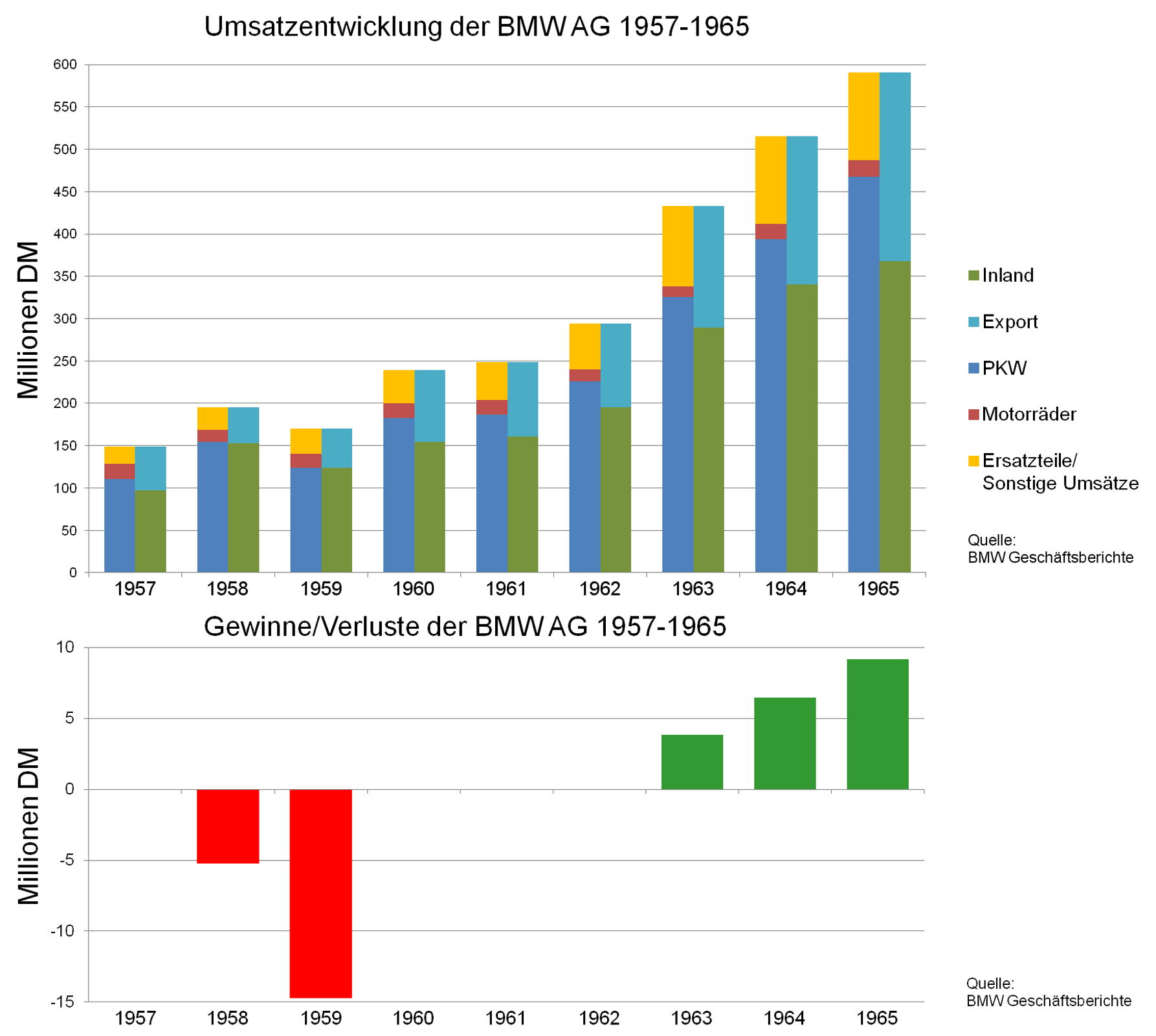
BMW financial results 1957-1965

In the years preceding the New Class's 1962 release, BMW had recorded many operating losses. In 1962, the company broke even, with a turnover of DM 294 million. In 1963, sales increased by 47% to DM 433 million, and BMW was able to pay dividends to its shareholders for the first time in 20 years.

=== Production figures ===
Model	Units
1500 (1962−64)	23,807
1600 (1964−66)	10,278
1800 (1963−71)	141,471
1800 TI (1964−68)	21,116
1800 TI/SA (1965)	200
2000 (1966−72)	119,767
2000 TI (1966−68)	6,482
2000 tilux (1966−71)	17,440
2000 tii (1970−71)	1,952
2000 CS (1965−70)	9,999
2000 C (1966−70)	3,692

== New Class Sedans ==
BMW New Class sedan
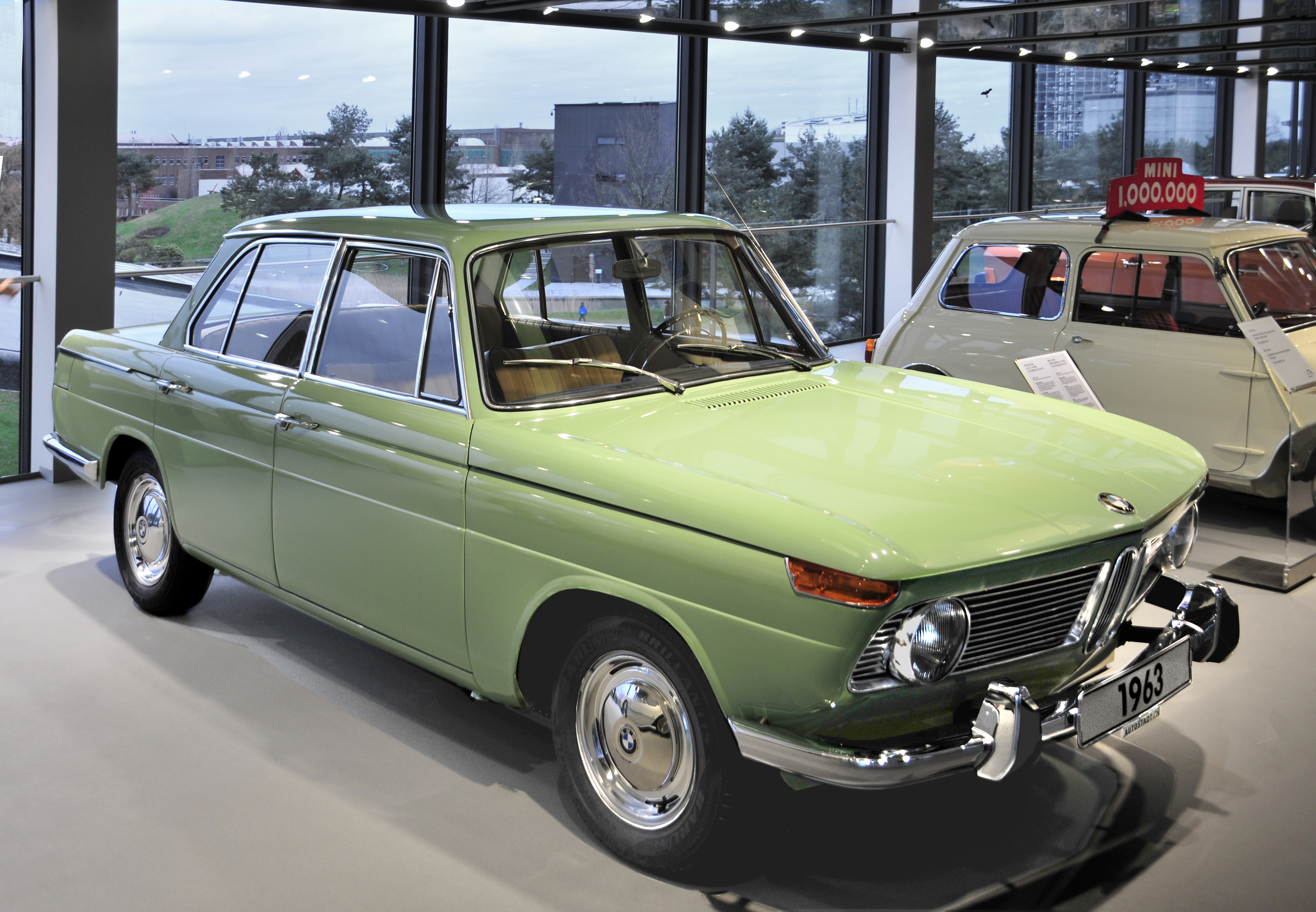
- BMW 1500

Overview
- Also called: 1500, 1800, 1800 TI, 1800 TI/SA, 1600, 2000, 2000 TI, 2000 tilux, 2000 tii
- Production: 1500: 1962–1964; 1800: 1963–1971; 1600: 1964–1966; 2000: 1966–1972
- Designer: Wilhelm Hofmeister; Giovanni Michelotti, consultant

Body and chassis
- Class: Mid-size luxury / Executive car (E)
- Body style: 4-door sedan

Powertrain
- Engine: M10 4-cyl 1500: 1,499 cc 1800: 1,773 cc (1963–1968), 1,766 cc (1968–1971); 1600: 1573 cc 2000: 1,990 cc
- Transmission: 4-speed manual 5-speed manual on 1800 TI/SA; 3-speed automatic optional on 1800/2000

Dimensions
- Wheelbase: 2,550 mm (100.4 in)
- Length: 4,500 mm (177.2 in)
- Width: 1,710 mm (67.3 in)
- Height: 1,445 mm (56.9 in) – 1,450 mm (57.1 in)

Chronology
- Successor: BMW E12 (BMW 5 Series)

=== 1500 ===
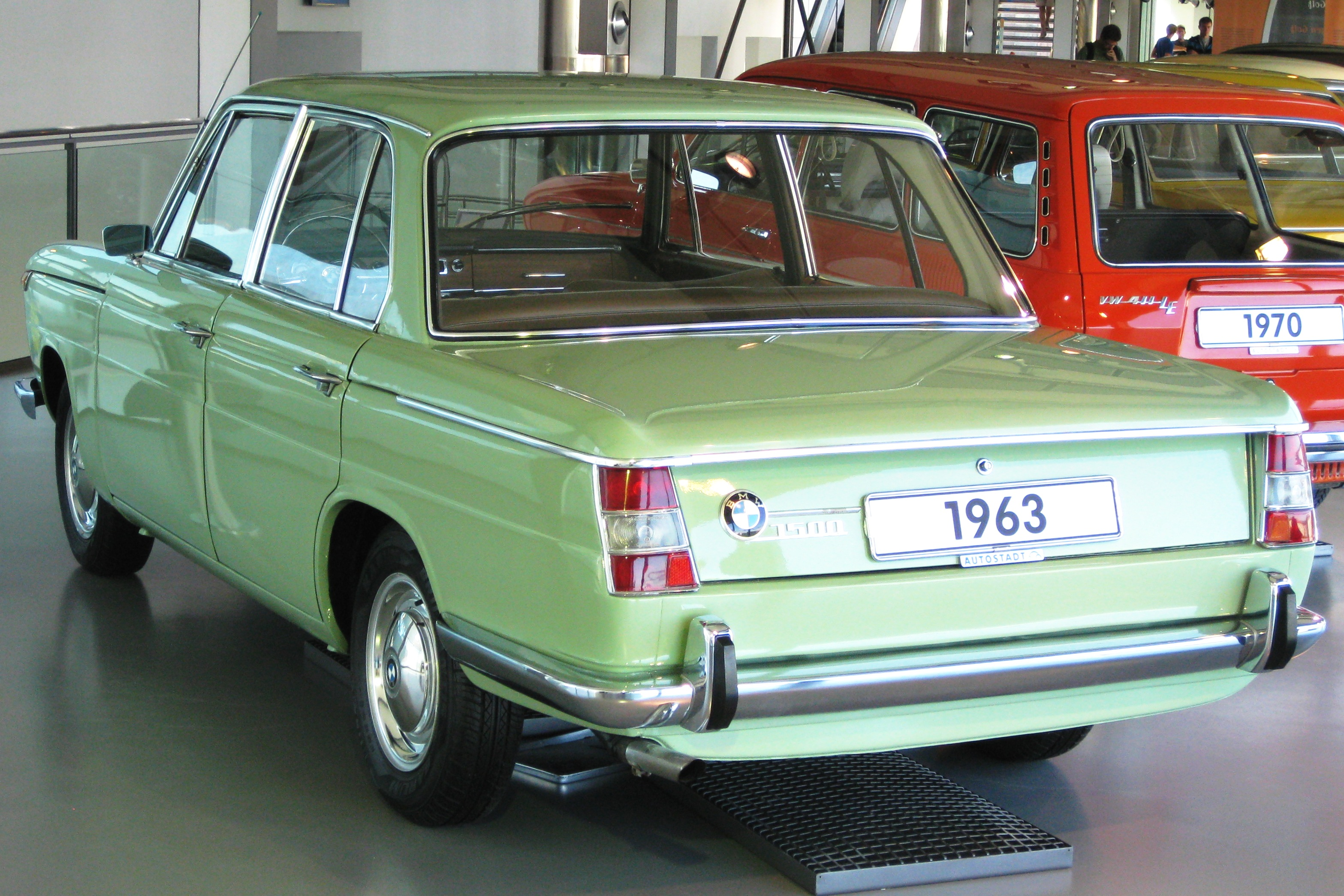
Rear 3/4 view of BMW 1500

Introduced in September 1961 at the Frankfurt Motor Show, the BMW 1500 entered regular production in October 1962 and was manufactured until December 1964.

The M10 4-cylinder engine used oversquare dimensions of 82 mm (3.2 in) bore and 71 mm (2.8 in) stroke produced 60 kW (80 hp) in the BMW 1500.

Contemporary reports praised the all-round visibility and the commanding driving position while recording that it was necessary to lean forward a little to engage first and third gears due to the long travel distance of the gear lever. The large 40 cm tall luggage compartment was also commended.

The 1500 could accelerate to 100 km/h (62 mph) in approximately 15 seconds. The performance was at the time considered lively in light of the engine size, and although the engine needed to be worked hard in order to achieve rapid progress, it ran smoothly even at speeds above 6,000 rpm. The firm suspension and correspondingly harsh ride surprised those conditioned by the BMW 501 to anticipate a more comfort-oriented suspension setup.

Notable problems that developed with the 1500 included separation of the semi-trailing arm mounts from the body, rear axle failure, and gearbox problems. These were resolved in later versions of the New Class sedan.

The 1500 was replaced in 1964 by the 1600, but it was still made available in markets where capacities greater than 1500 cc incurred higher tax rates.

=== 1800 ===
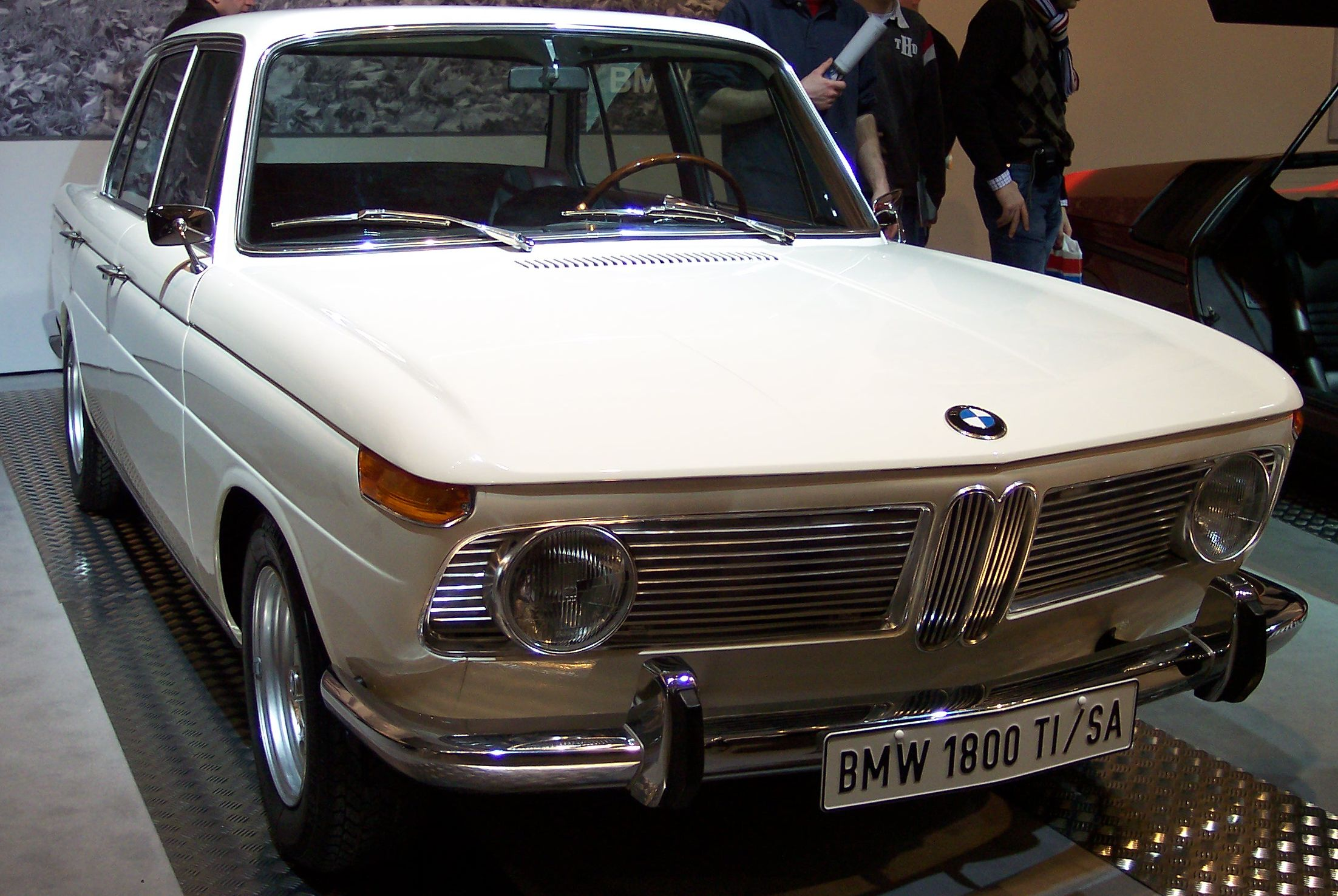
1965 BMW 1800 TI/SA

Introduced in September 1963, the BMW 1800 was the second member of the New Class family. This model had an M10 engine with an 84 mm (3.3 in) bore and 80 mm (3.1 in) stroke, giving a displacement of 1,773 cc. It produced 67 kW (90 hp) at 5,250 rpm and 130 N⋅m (96 lb⋅ft) at 3,000 rpm.

The 1800 TI (Turismo Internazionale) model featured components developed for the 1800 by the tuning company Alpina. The upgrades included dual Solex PHH two-barrel side-draft carburetors and higher-compression pistons for 82 kW (110 hp) at 5,800 rpm and 136 N⋅m (100 lb⋅ft) at 4,000 rpm; an anti-roll bar was also added to the front suspension.

A homologation special, the 1800 TI/SA, was introduced in 1964. (The SA stood for Sonderausführung, or "special version".) The TI/SA's engine had dual Weber DCOE-45 two-barrel carburetors and a 10.5:1 compression ratio. This engine produced 97 kW (130 hp) at 6,100 rpm and 144 N⋅m (106 lb⋅ft) at 5,250 rpm. The TI/SA also had a Getrag five-speed gearbox, a stronger front anti-roll bar as well as a new anti-roll bar at the rear, and larger-diameter brake discs than the TI. 200 examples of the TI/SA were built and were only sold to licensed racing and sports drivers.

For the 1966 model year, a three-speed automatic transmission option was introduced. In the 1969 model year, the 1800 was generally updated along with the 2000. The 1800's former 1,773 cc (108.2 cu in) engine was replaced by an engine with the 89 mm (3.5 in) bore of the 2000's 2.0 L engine and the original 71 mm (2.8 in) stroke of the 1500's and 1600's engines, which resulted in a displacement of 1,766 cc (107.8 cu in) and a stroke/bore ratio of 0.798:1 (compared with the previous 1800 engine's ratio of 0.952:1).. Other updates included a dual-circuit brake system for greater braking reliability, an improved cabin heating/ventilation system, a modernized dashboard design, and styling changes to the front grilles. In its last year of production (1971), the 1800 got the same rectangular headlights and wide taillights as the 2000.

=== 1600 ===
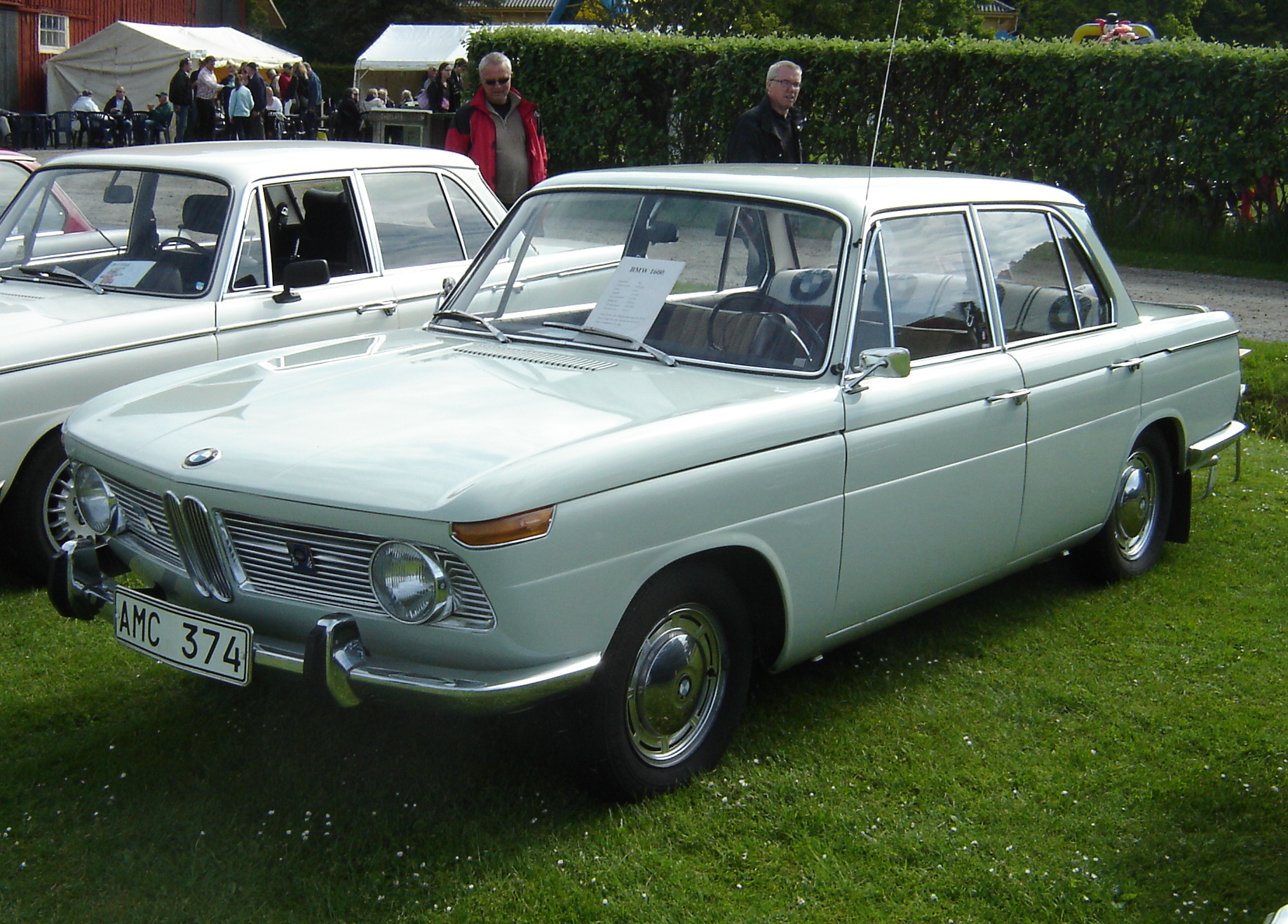
BMW 1600 (116)

The 1600 New Class sedan, introduced as the replacement to the 1500 in 1964, used the 84 mm (3.3 in) bore of the 1800 with the 1500's 71 mm (2.8 in) stroke, resulting in a displacement of 1,573 cc, a power output of 62 kW (83 hp) at 5,500 rpm and 113 N⋅m (83 lb⋅ft) at 3,000 rpm. The 1600 New Class sedan was produced until early 1966.

(Around the time BMW discontinued the 1600 New Class sedan, it introduced a shorter two-door model under the same "1600" name; this model, also known as the 1600-2, was the first in what would later be called the 02 Series.)

=== 2000 ===
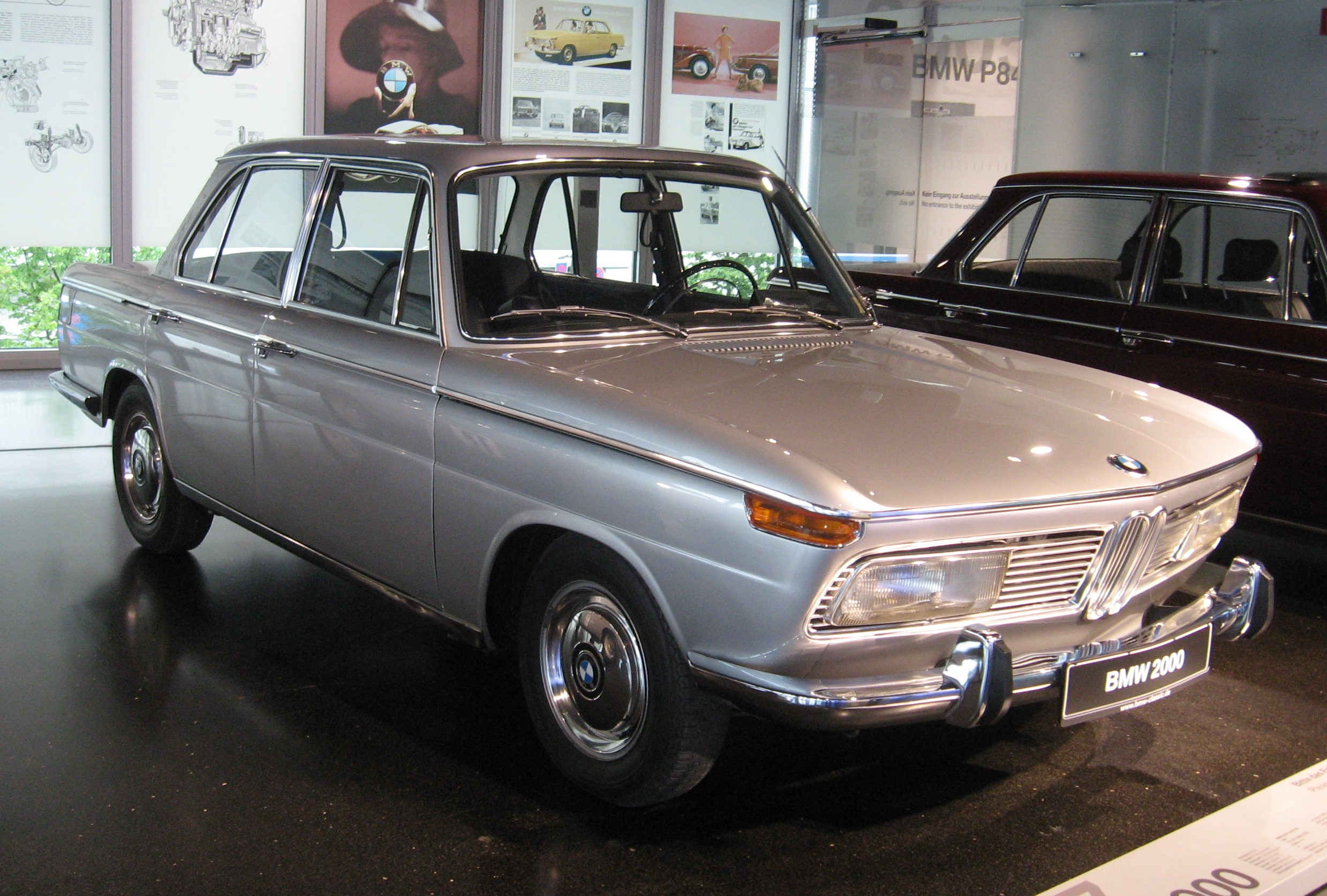
2000 Automatic, the automatic transmission version

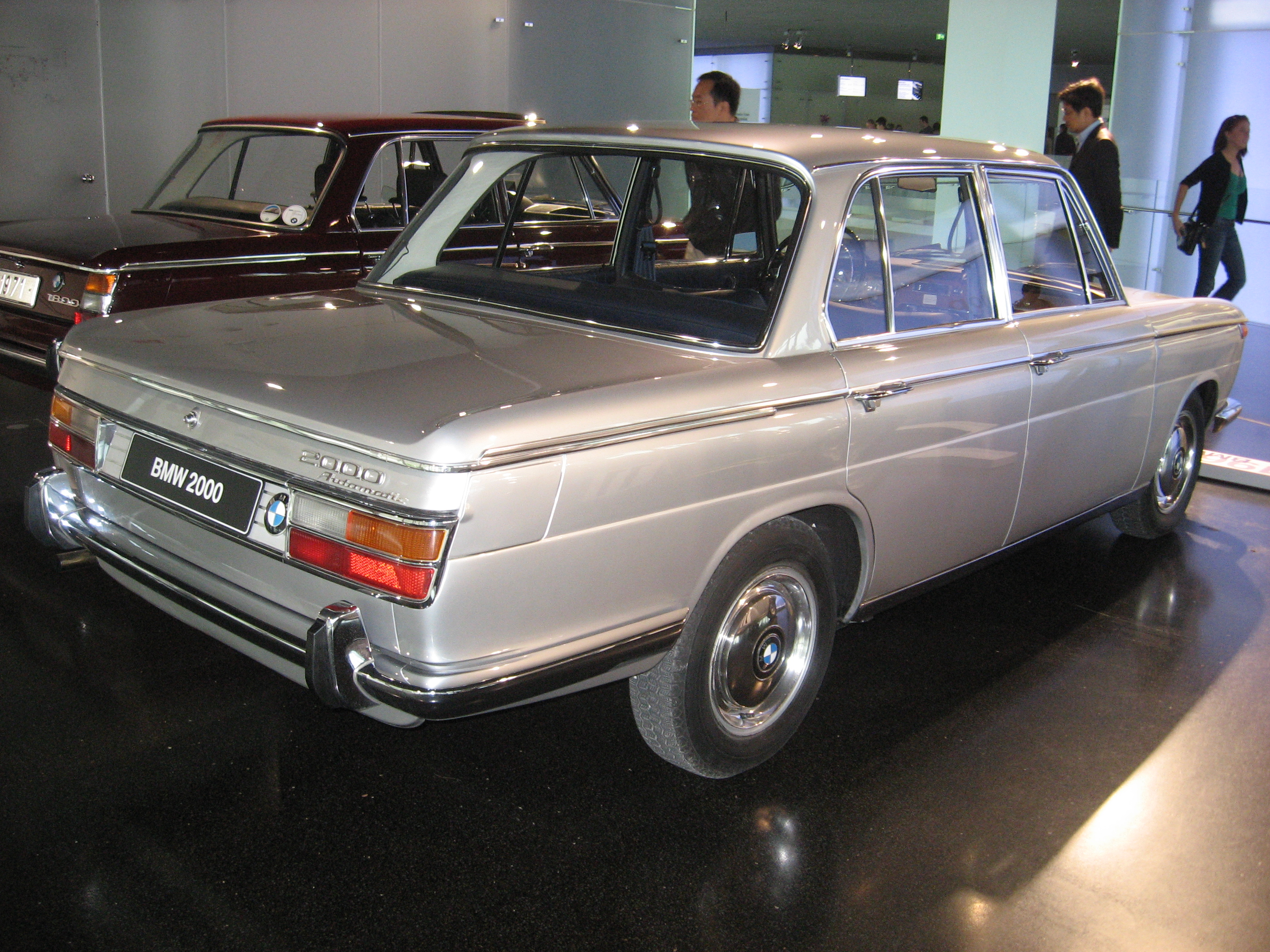
The 2000 Automatic's rear, showing the 2000's wide taillights

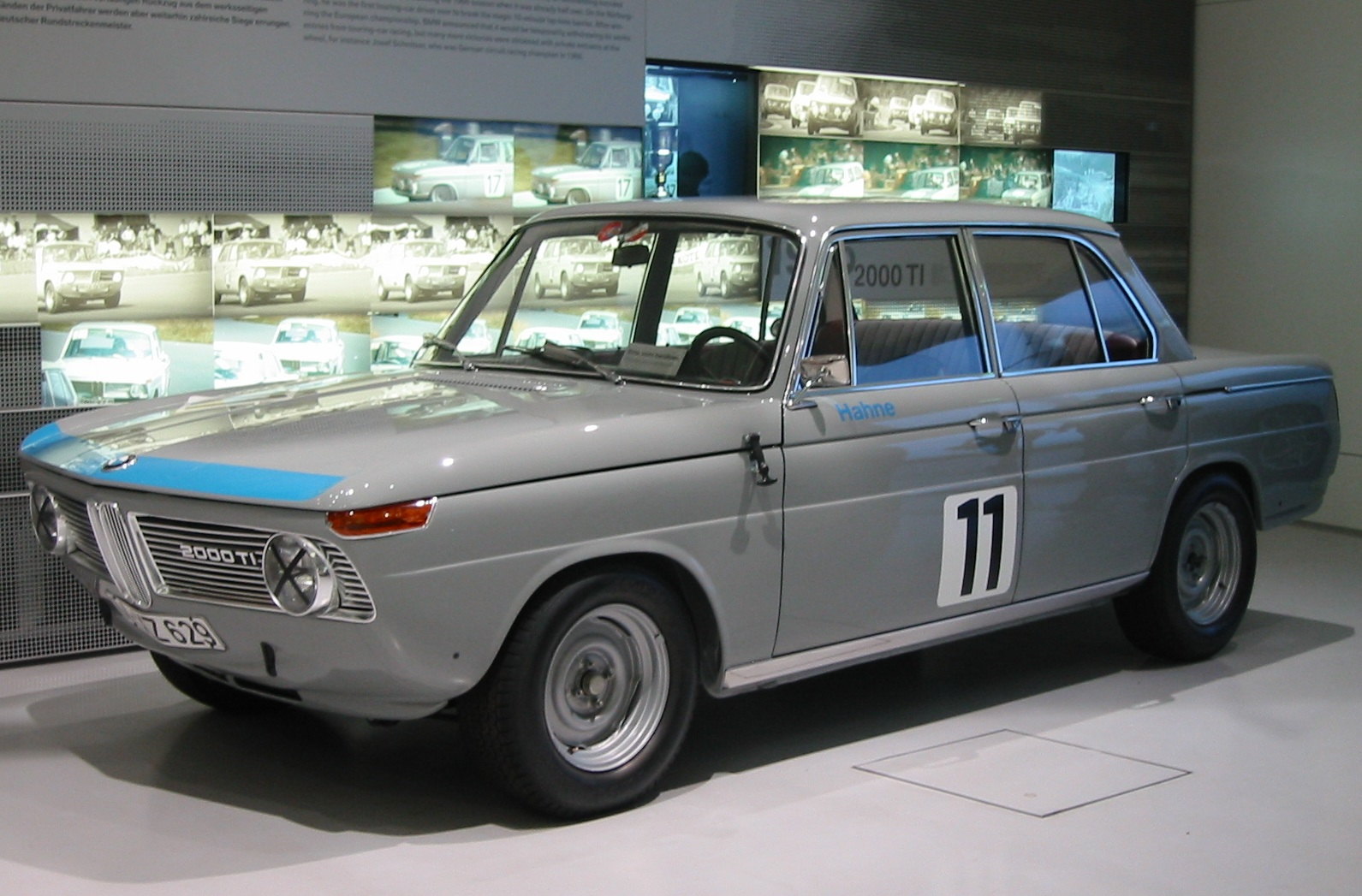
A 2000 TI with round headlights in racing trim

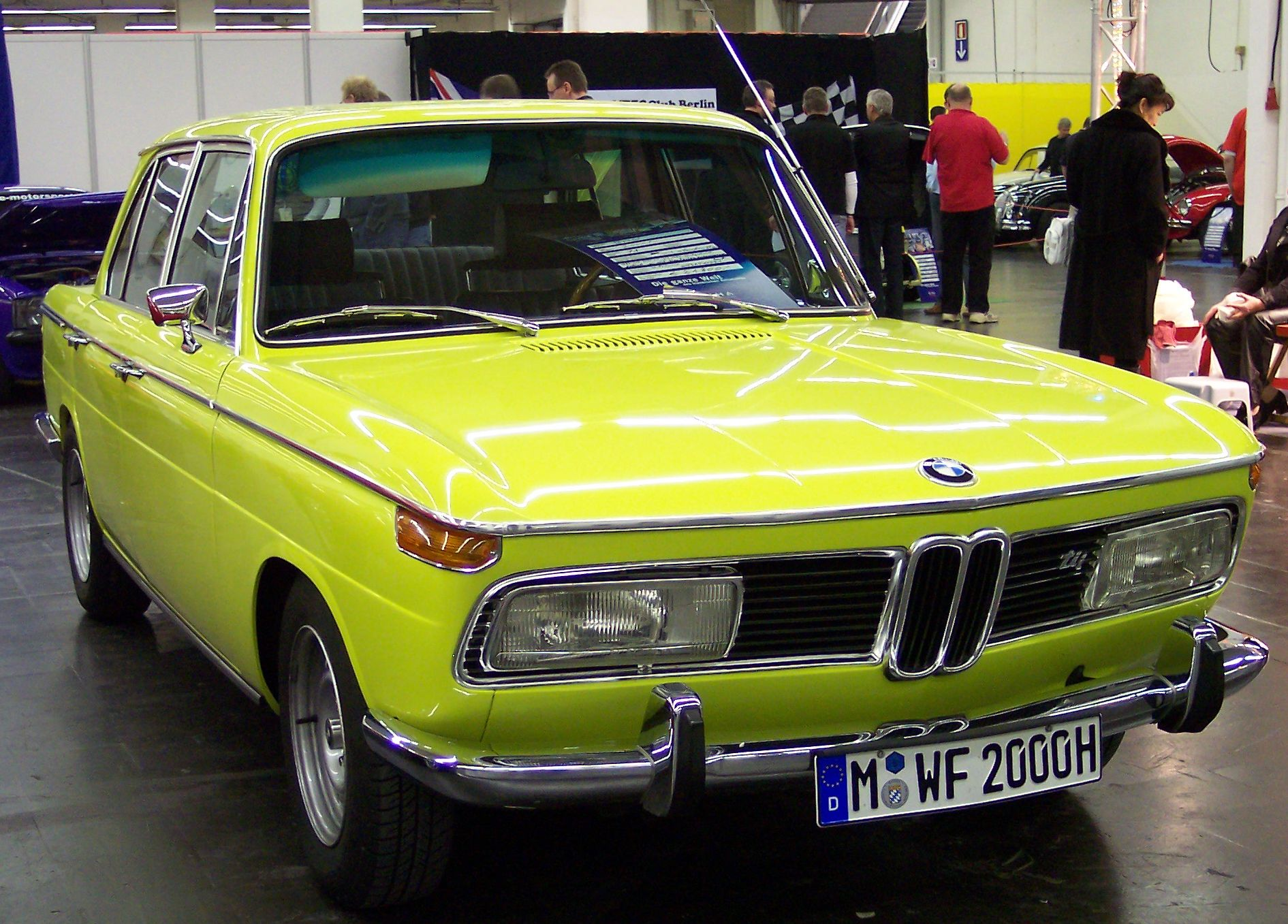
BMW 2000 tii

The engines from the 2000 C and 2000 CS coupes were used in the 4-door sedan body for the 2000 and 2000 TI models. The 2000 sedan, released in 1965, used the 75 kW (101 hp) engine from the 2000 C, and like the 2000 C, it had an option for a three-speed automatic transmission. The 2000 TI sedan, released in 1966, used the 90 kW (121 hp) engine from the 2000 CS with twin Solex PHH two-barrel side-draft carburetors and a higher compression ratio. In addition to its more powerful engine, the 2000 TI also had front and rear anti-roll bars and somewhat wider wheel rims and tires than the 2000.

Intended as an upscale version of the 1800, the 2000 featured unique rectangular headlights, distinctive wide taillights, and more exterior trim. (U.S. government regulations of the period put severe restrictions on headlight shape, so 2000 sedans for the U.S. market replaced the rectangular headlights with two pairs of individual round headlights, similar to the arrangement used a few years later in the BMW 2500 sedan.) The 2000 TI retained the round headlights and vertically-arranged taillights of the 1800 and other earlier New Class sedans, and it was otherwise less well-equipped than its 2000 sibling. Introduced soon after the 2000 and 2000 TI, the more luxurious 2000 tilux combined the 2000 TI's sportier engine and chassis with the 2000's exterior styling and higher-grade interior and accessories, including a wood dashboard and optional leather seats.

In a 1967 test, Road & Track felt that the 2000 sedan was "the best performing 2-liter sedan in today's market and the best handling and best riding as well."

For the 1969 model year, the 2000 got the same general updates mentioned above for the 1800: dual-circuit brakes for reliable braking even in the event of partial failure, better heating and ventilation for the interior, an updated dashboard layout, and a restyled front grille.

In 1969, BMW introduced the final model in the New Class sedan series, the 2000 tii ('touring international, injected'). This was BMW's first fuel-injected model, featuring Kugelfischer mechanical fuel injection. The 2000 tii produced 97 kW (130 hp) at 5,800 rpm and 178 N⋅m (131 lb⋅ft) at 4,500 rpm. Apart from its improved, fuel-injected engine, the 2000 tii had features similar to the 2000 tilux; a total of 1,952 examples of it were built.

=== Production volumes ===
Note that not all models are included.

Model	1600	1800	1800 TI	1800 TI/SA
1963			8,346	
1964	2,131	25,063	8,191	
1965	6,395	38,048	12,427	200
1966	1,202	13,393	4	
1967		8,893	419	
1968		7,777	67	
1969		11,273	1	
1970		14,367		
1971		7,654		
Total	9,728	134,814	21,116	200

== New Class Coupés ==
BMW 2000 C BMW 2000 CS
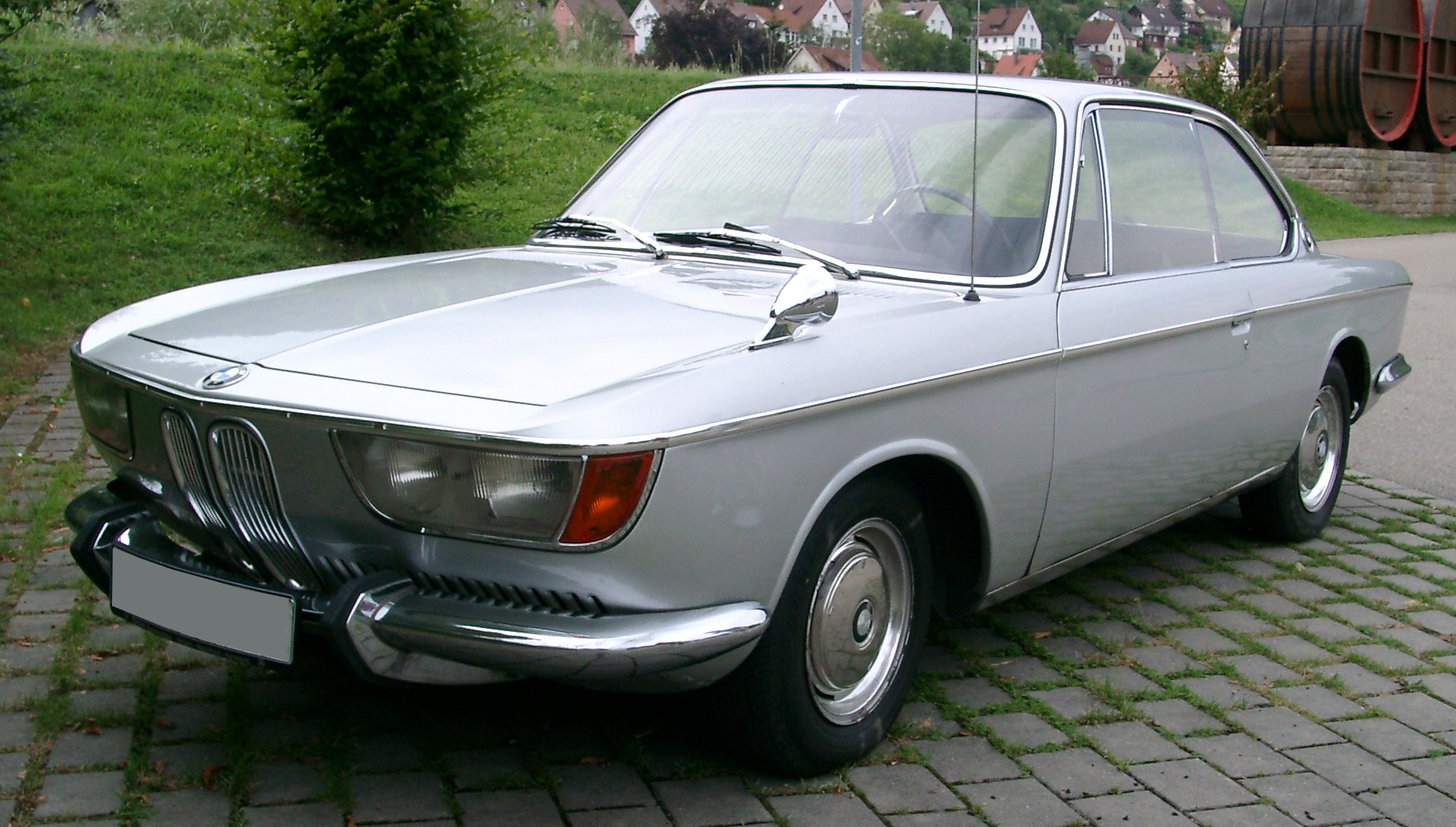
- BMW 2000 CS

Overview
- Manufacturer: BMW
- Production: 1965–1969
- Assembly: West Germany: Rheine (by Karmann)
- Designer: Wilhelm Hofmeister

Body and chassis
- Class: Grand tourer
- Body style: 2-door coupé
- Layout: FR layout
- Platform: BMW New Class
- Related: BMW New Class; BMW E9

Powertrain
- Engine: 2.0 L OHC I4; 2000 C: single carburettor, 100 hp (75 kW) at 5500 rpm 2000 CS: two carburettors, 120 hp (89 kW) at 5500 rpm
- Transmission: 4-speed manual 3-speed automatic (available on 2000 C only)

Dimensions
- Wheelbase: 2,550 mm (100.4 in)
- Length: 4,530 mm (178.3 in)
- Width: 1,675 mm (65.9 in)
- Height: 1,360 mm (53.5 in)

Chronology
- Predecessor: BMW 3200 CS
- Successor: BMW 2800 CS

The BMW New Class coupé range, which comprised the BMW 2000 C and BMW 2000 CS, was a coupé body style built by Karmann for BMW from the summer of 1965 to 1969. In 1965, BMW ended production of their Bertone-bodied 3200 CS coupé, the last of their line of V8 powered luxury cars from the 1950s. BMW decided to continue with a coachbuilt coupé. Based on the New Class platform, the 2000 C and 2000 CS introduced the 2.0 L version of the M10 4-cylinder engine and replaced the 3200 CS as BMW's flagship model in 1965.. The New Class coupes were replaced by the E9 coupés, which were based on a stretched 2000 CS chassis and use a 6-cylinder engine.

=== Technical ===
The New Class coupé was developed from the New Class sedans to showcase the 2.0 L version of the M10 engine used in the sedans. The new displacement of 1,990 cc (121 cu in) was achieved with the 80 millimetres (3.1 in) stroke of the 1.8 L version combined with an 89 millimetres (3.5 in) bore. The coupé was built for BMW by Karmann in Rheine and available as the 2000 C, with a single-carburettor engine delivering 100 horsepower (75 kW) at 5500 rpm, or as the 2000 CS with a higher-compression engine equipped with dual twin-barrel carburettors and delivering 120 hp (89 kW) at 5500 rpm. The 2000 CS had a four-speed manual transmission, while the 2000 C (first introduced in 1965 as the 2000 C Automatic) originally came with a three-speed automatic transmission. Starting in 1967 the 2000 C was also offered with the four-speed manual.

=== Styling ===
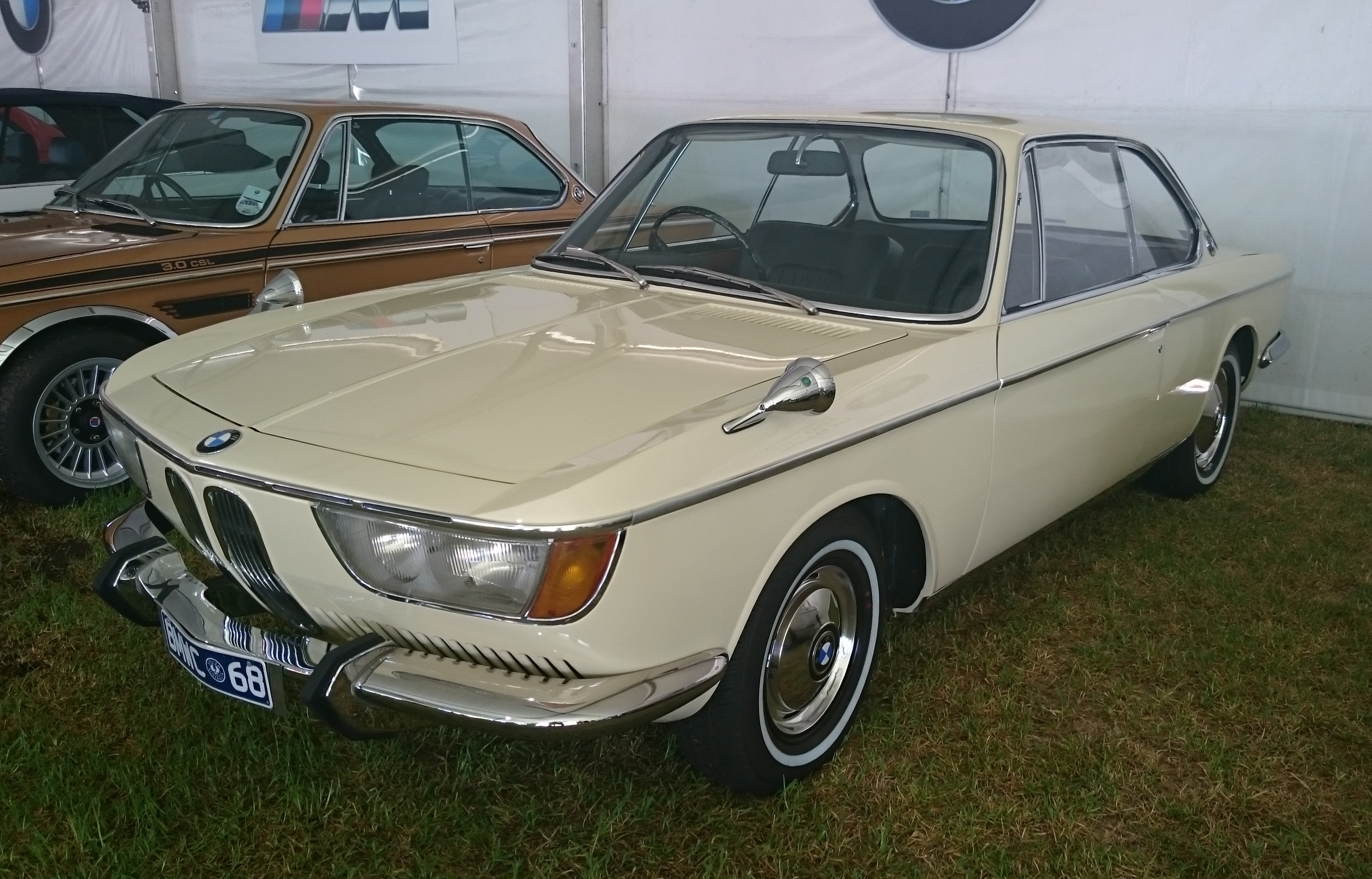
BMW 2000 C

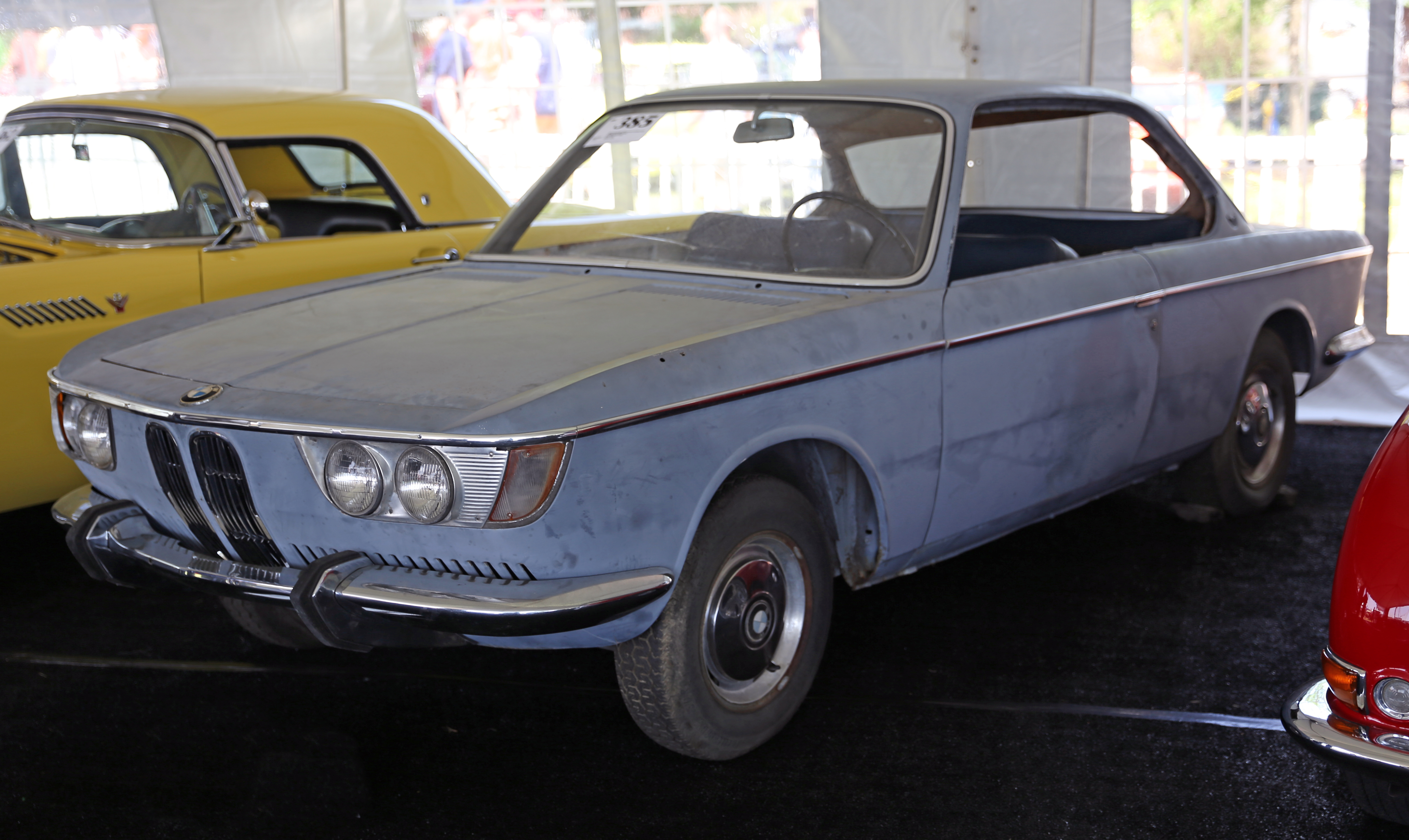
The front end of the 2000 C/CS as sold in North America

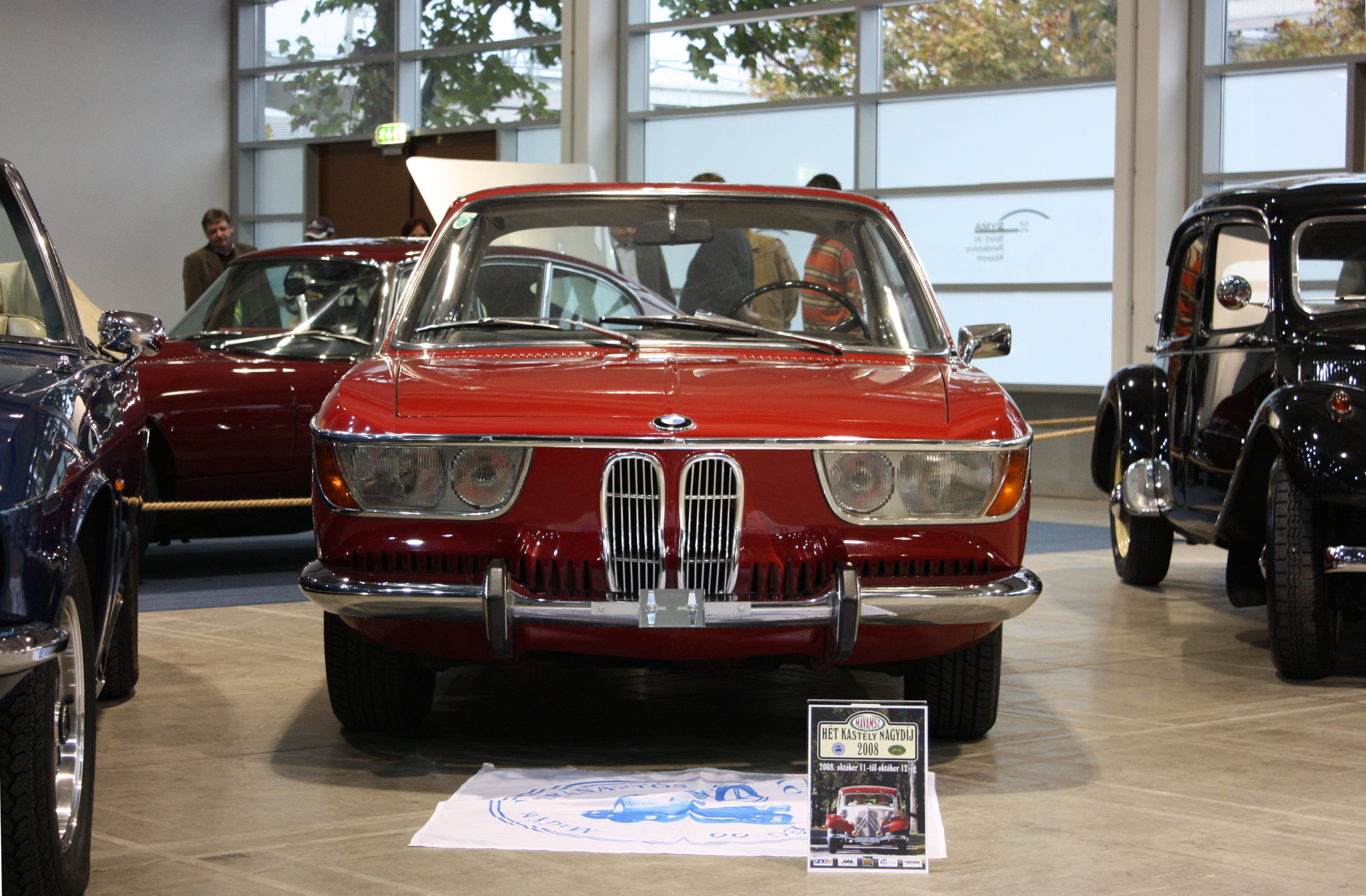
Full frontal shot of the 2000 CS

The New Class coupé was introduced just after the 3200 CS coupé was discontinued. The styling was based on the New Class sedan, with an all-new front end. The headlights were behind a glass fairing, and the grille consisted solely of a chromed BMW "double-kidney" at the centre of the front. Apart from chrome accents around the headlights and along the top of the front end, the rest of the front was painted metal, with a row of vertical slots behind the bumper on each side to admit air for cooling and engine induction. Unlike the sedan, the coupe featured a pillarless design, with no B pillar between the front and rear side windows. Reactions to the front end styling have been mixed; Norbye describes it as "a blunt, unattractive front end", Severson agrees, calling the front clip "odd-looking" and stating that the details of the front end "do no favors for the looks", while Noakes disagrees, referring to its "imposing front end" being "tidier than the Bertone body's fussy nose" in comparison to the 3200 CS.

=== Production ===
Of the 13,691 New Class coupés built between 1965 and the end of production in mid-1969, 9,999 were twin carburettor 2000 CS coupés, 3,249 were single carburettor 2000 C coupés with automatic transmission, and 443 were 2000 C coupés with manual transmission.

=== Replacement ===
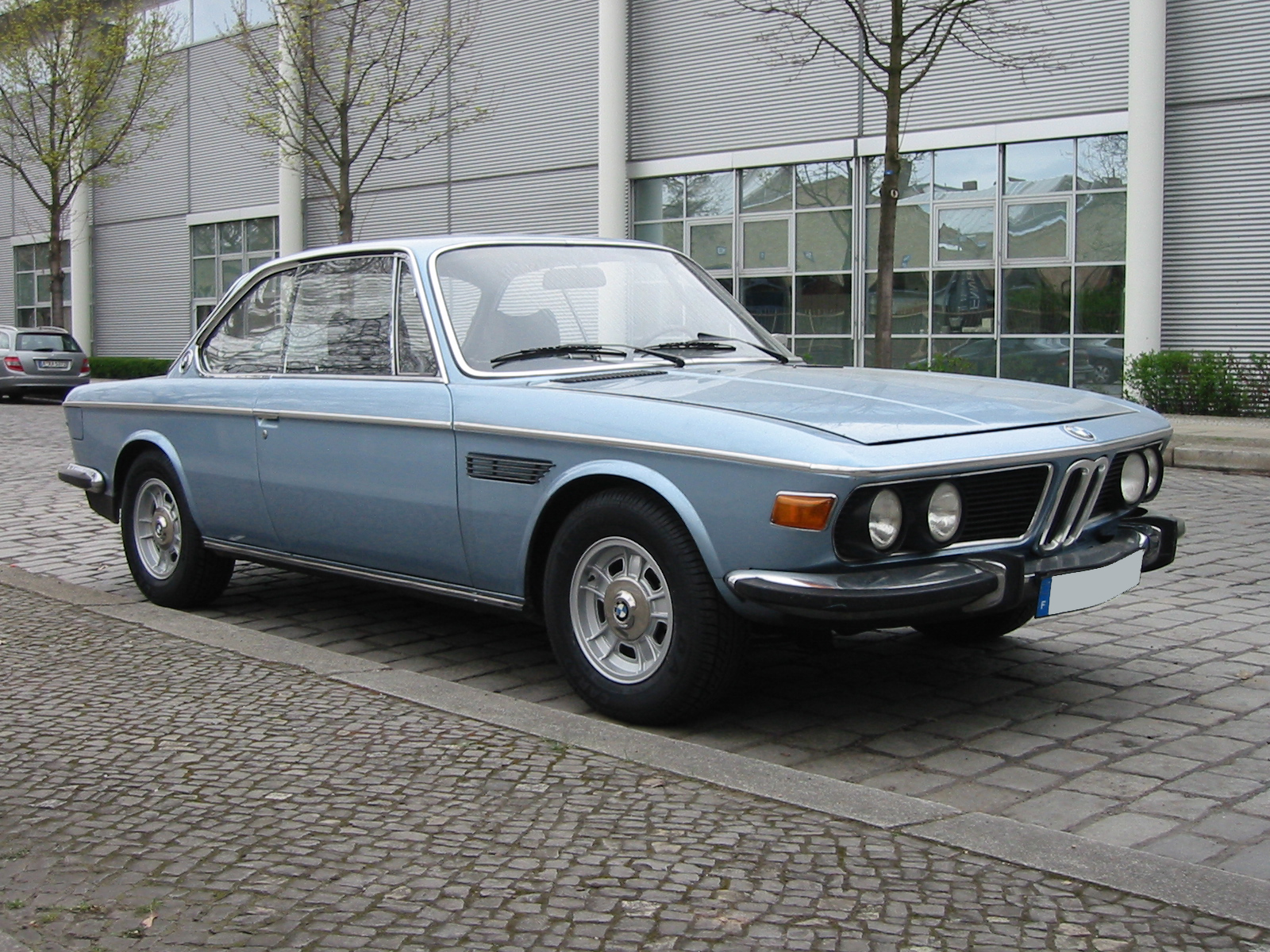
The New Class coupé evolved into the BMW E9 of the late 1960s and early 1970s

In 1968, the New Class coupés were replaced by the six-cylinder New Six CS (E9) models, which have a longer wheelbase and longer front clip to accommodate the M30 engine. The front end styling was also modified to resemble that of the New Six (E3) sedans.

At the Paris Motor Show in 1968, BMW displayed a concept vehicle called the 2000ti Coupe, a coupe designed by Pietro Frua of the Glas car company (which BMW had taken over two years earlier). The 2000ti did not reach production.

== 02 Series ==
The "02 Series" range of two-door sedans, coupes and convertibles began production in 1966, and was based on a shortened version of the New Class Sedan platform.

== Motorsport ==
- A BMW 1800 TI/SA won the 1965 Spa 24 Hours touring car race.
- A BMW 2000 TI won the 1966 Spa 24 Hours touring car race.
- Hubert Hahne won the 1966 European Touring Car Challenge (Division 3) driving a BMW 2000 TI.
