= Bavar =

Bavar may refer to:

- Bavar (Jajce), a village in Bosnia and Herzegovina
- Bavar, Iran, a village in Iran
- Bavar 373, an Iranian missile system
- Bavar-class, Iranian missile boats
- Bavar 2, Iranian Navy vehicle
- Emily Bavar, American journalist

== See also ==
- Bavaria (disambiguation)
- Bawar, a region in northern India
