= Bavaria (disambiguation) =

Bavaria is one of the 16 federal states of Germany.

Bavaria may also refer to:

== Places ==
=== Germany ===
- Duchy of Bavaria (c. 555–1805)
- Electorate of Bavaria (1623–1805)
- Free State of Bavaria (Weimar Republic) (1919–1933)
- Kingdom of Bavaria (1805–1918)
- Bavarian Soviet Republic (1919), a short-lived communist state

=== Italy ===
- Bavaria (Nervesa della Battaglia), a town

=== United States ===
- Bavaria, Kansas, a community
- Bavaria, Wisconsin, an unincorporated community
- Lake Bavaria, a lake in Minnesota

== Beer ==
- Bavaria beer, a brand of FIFCO
- Bavaria Brau, a South African brewery
- Bavaria Brewery (Colombia), a Colombian brewery
- Bavaria Brewery (Netherlands), a Dutch brewery and brewer of several beers named Bavaria, including:
  - Bavaria non alcoholic beer

== Other ==
- Bavaria Film, a film company based in Germany
- Bavaria (train), which ran between Munich and Zurich or Geneva
- Bavaria Yachtbau, a German sailing and motor yacht builder
- BMW Bavaria, a luxury sedan produced by BMW
- L'Entrecôte, a defunct brasserie in Geneva called The Bavaria
- Porzellanfabrik Bavaria, a porcelain factory

== See also ==
- Babaria (Bavaria), a Koli clan of India
- Bavarian (disambiguation)
- Bavarii, a Germanic tribe
- Baviera, a neighbourhood of Valletta, Malta
