= BMW 7 Series =

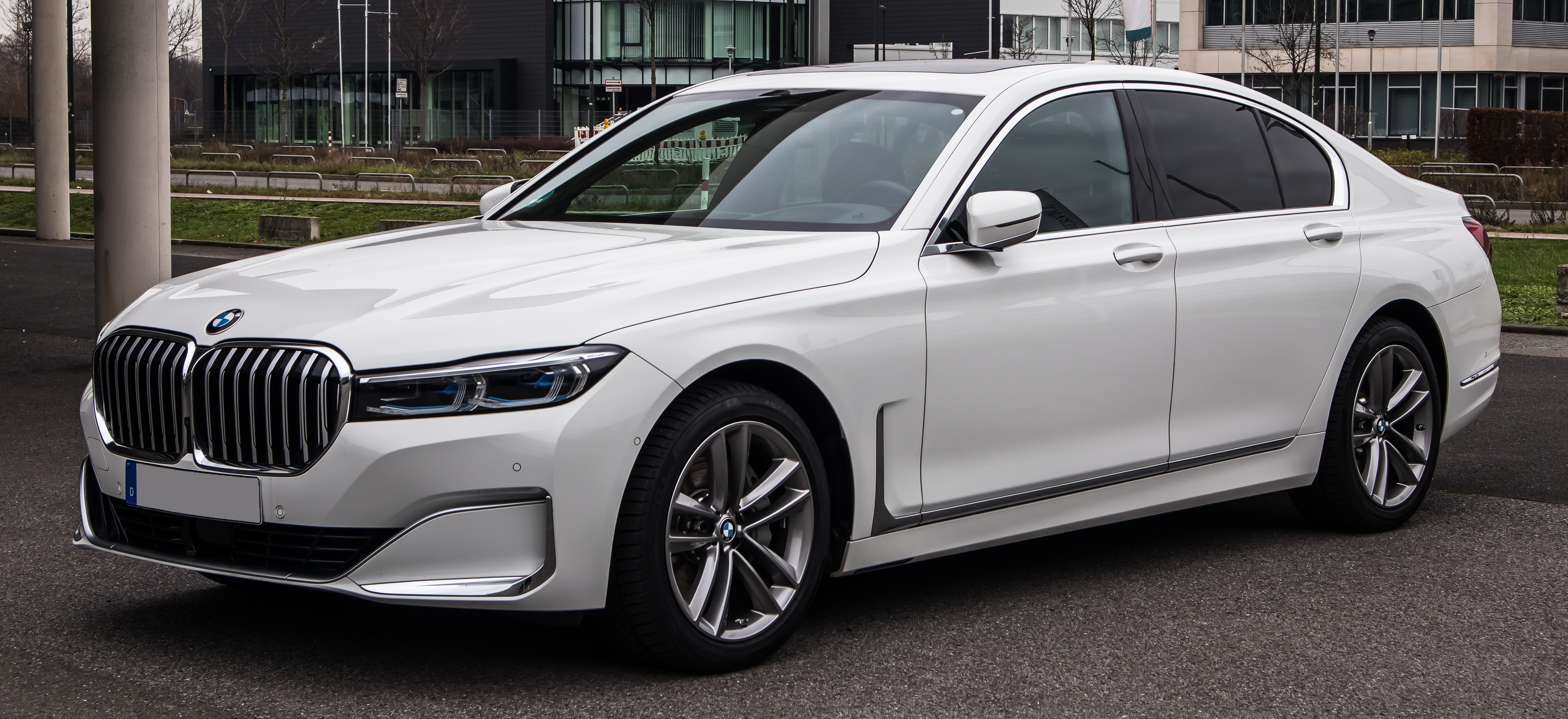
- 2021 BMW 730d (G11, facelift)

Overview
- Manufacturer: BMW
- Production: 1977–present

Body and chassis
- Class: Full-size luxury car (F)
- Body style: 4-door saloon

Chronology
- Predecessor: BMW New Six

The BMW 7 Series is a full-size luxury sedan manufactured and marketed by the German automaker BMW since 1977. It is the successor to the BMW E3 "New Six" sedan and is now in its seventh generation.

The 7 Series is BMW's flagship car and is only available in a sedan bodystyle (including long wheelbase and limousine models). It traditionally introduces technologies and exterior design themes before other models in BMW's lineup.

The first generation of the 7 Series was powered by straight-6 petrol engines, and following generations have been powered by inline-4, straight-6, V8 and V12 engines with both natural aspiration and turbocharging. Since 1995, diesel engines have been optional in the 7 Series.

Unlike the BMW 3 Series and BMW 5 Series sedans, BMW does not offer a full M model, but once offered an M performance variant, the BMW M760 with its 6.6L V12 (at the time the most powerful BMW ever made, not to be confused with BMW 760 6.6 V12 which does not offer the same performance). The Alpina B7 served as the high-performance variant of the 7 Series.

== First generation (E23; 1977) ==
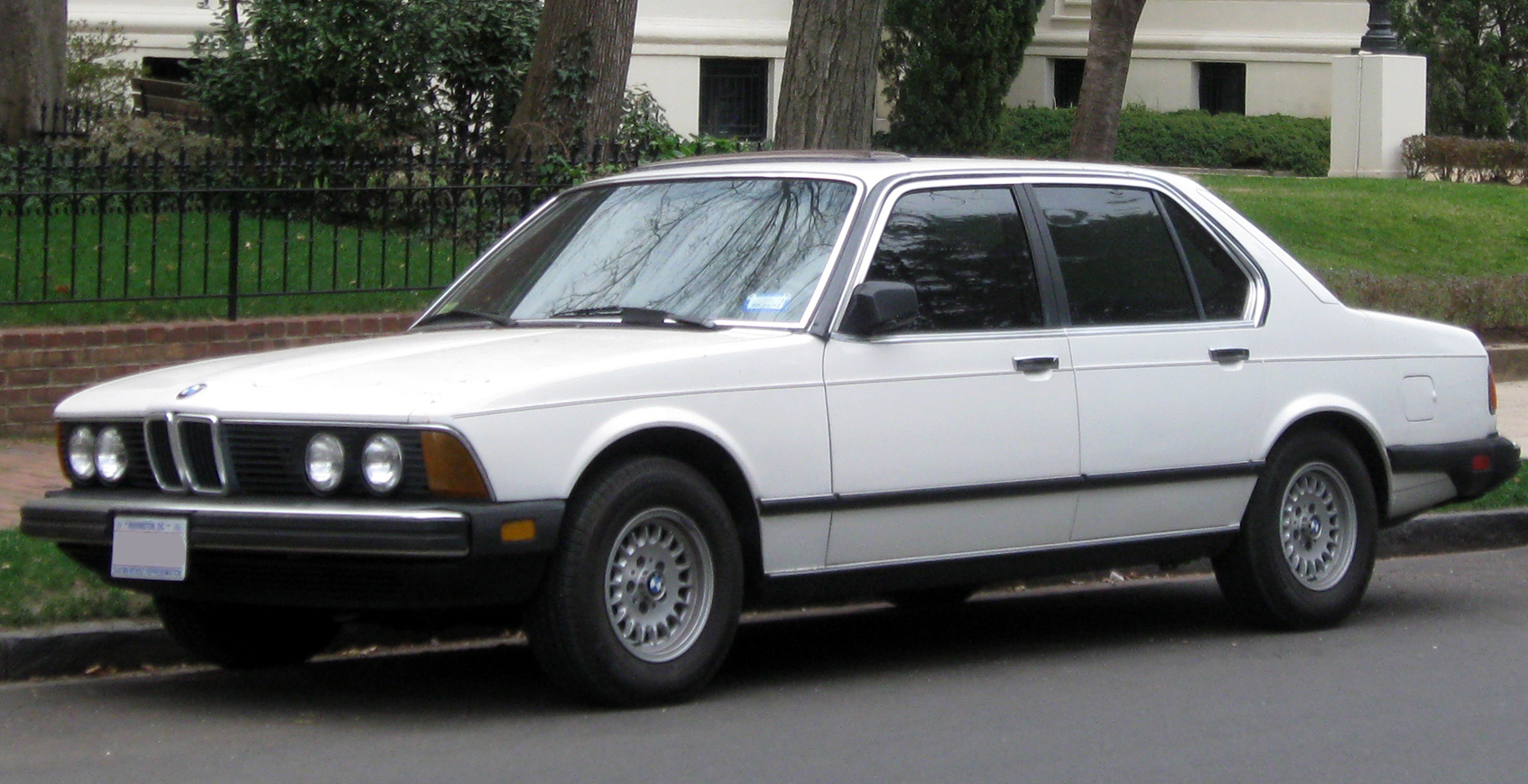
BMW 733i sedan (US)

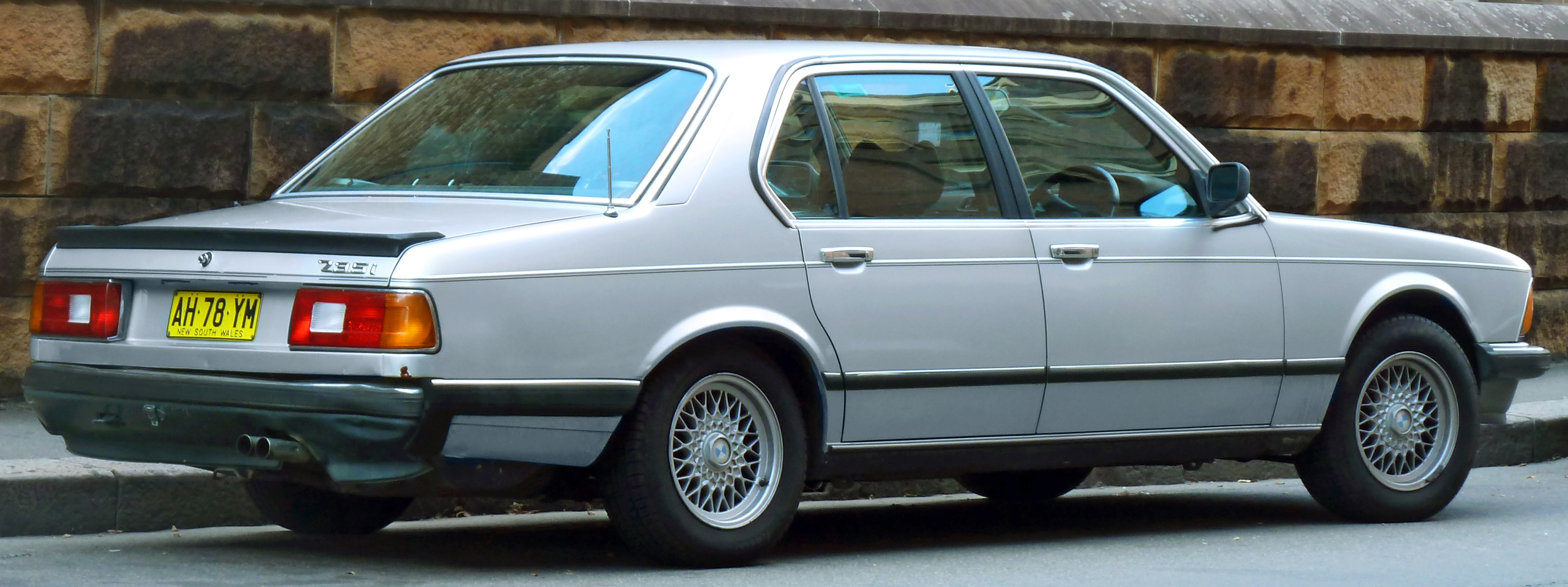
BMW 735i sedan (Australia)

The E23 is the first generation 7 Series and was produced from 1977 to 1987. It was built in a 4-door sedan style with 6-cylinder engines, to replace the E3 sedans. From 1983 to 1987, a turbocharged 6-cylinder engine was available in some markets.

The E23 introduced many electronic features for the first time in a BMW, including an onboard computer, a service interval indicator, a "check control panel" (warning lights to indicate system faults to the driver), a dictaphone, and complex climate control systems. It was also the first BMW to offer an anti-lock braking system (ABS), a driver's airbag, and double-link front suspension.

== Second generation (E32; 1986) ==
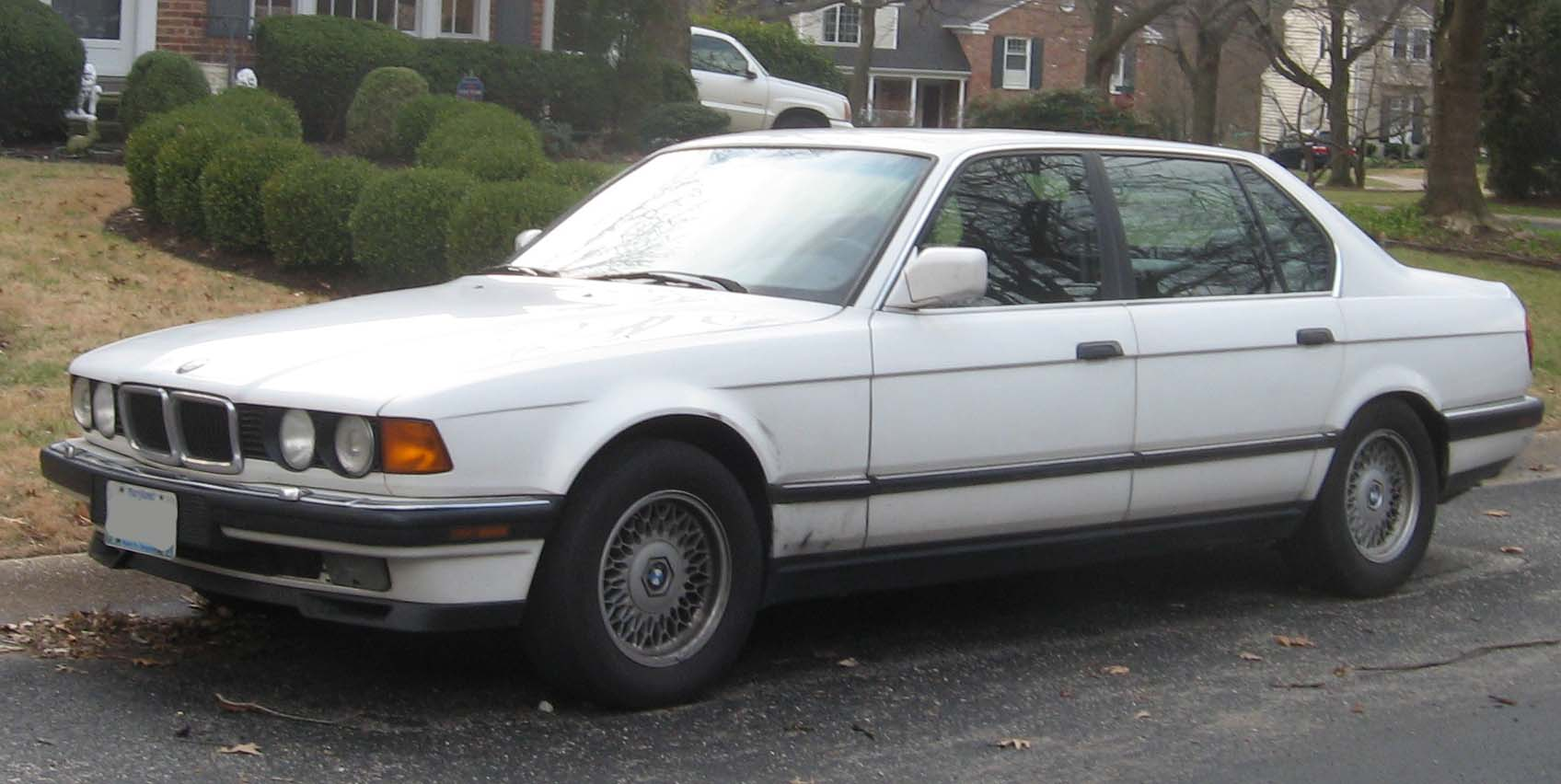
BMW 740iL sedan

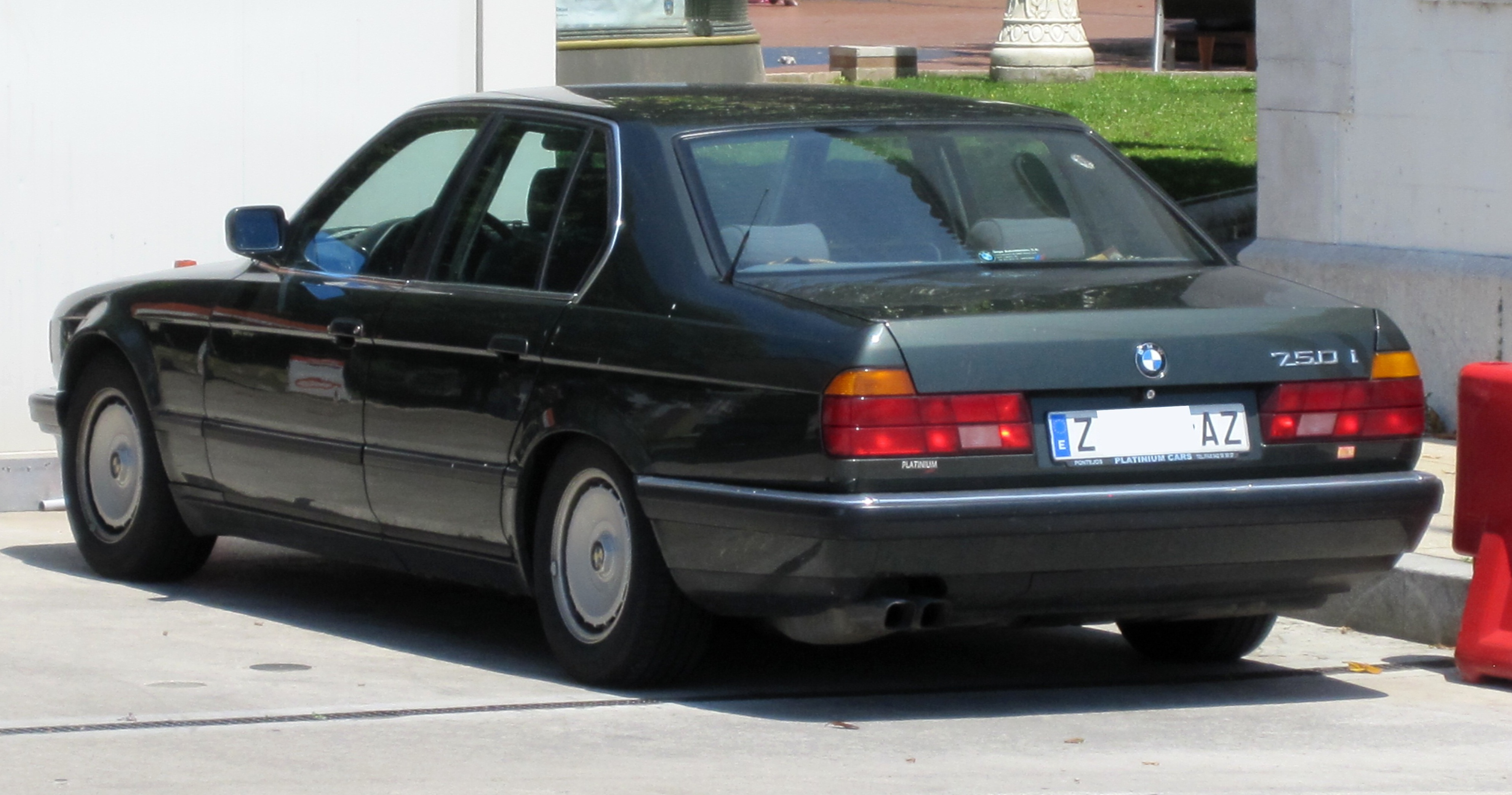
BMW 750i sedan

The E32 is the second generation of the 7 Series, which was produced from 1986 to 1994. It was initially available with a straight-six or V12 engine, the latter being Germany's first passenger car with a V12 since World War II. In 1992, V8 engines became available.

The E32 introduced the following features for the first time in a BMW: Electronic Damper Control, V12 and V8 engines, double glazing, the CAN bus electronic protocol, Xenon headlamps, traction control and dual-zone climate control. The E32 750i was the first car adhering to BMW's self-imposed speed limit of 250 km/h (155 mph). The 'iL' models re-introduced a long-wheelbase option not offered by BMW since the 'L' variants of the E3 "New Six".

== Third generation (E38; 1994) ==
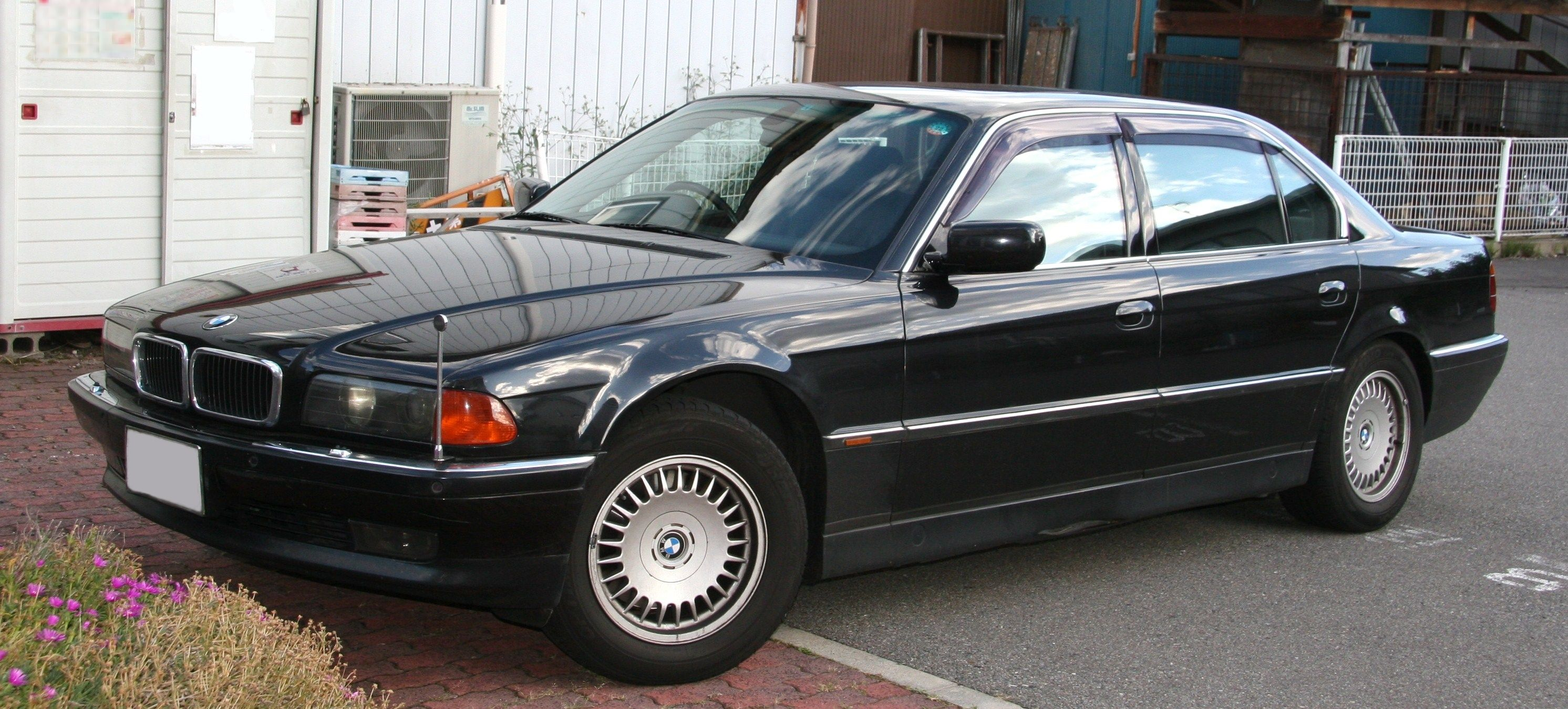
BMW 750iL (Pre-facelift)

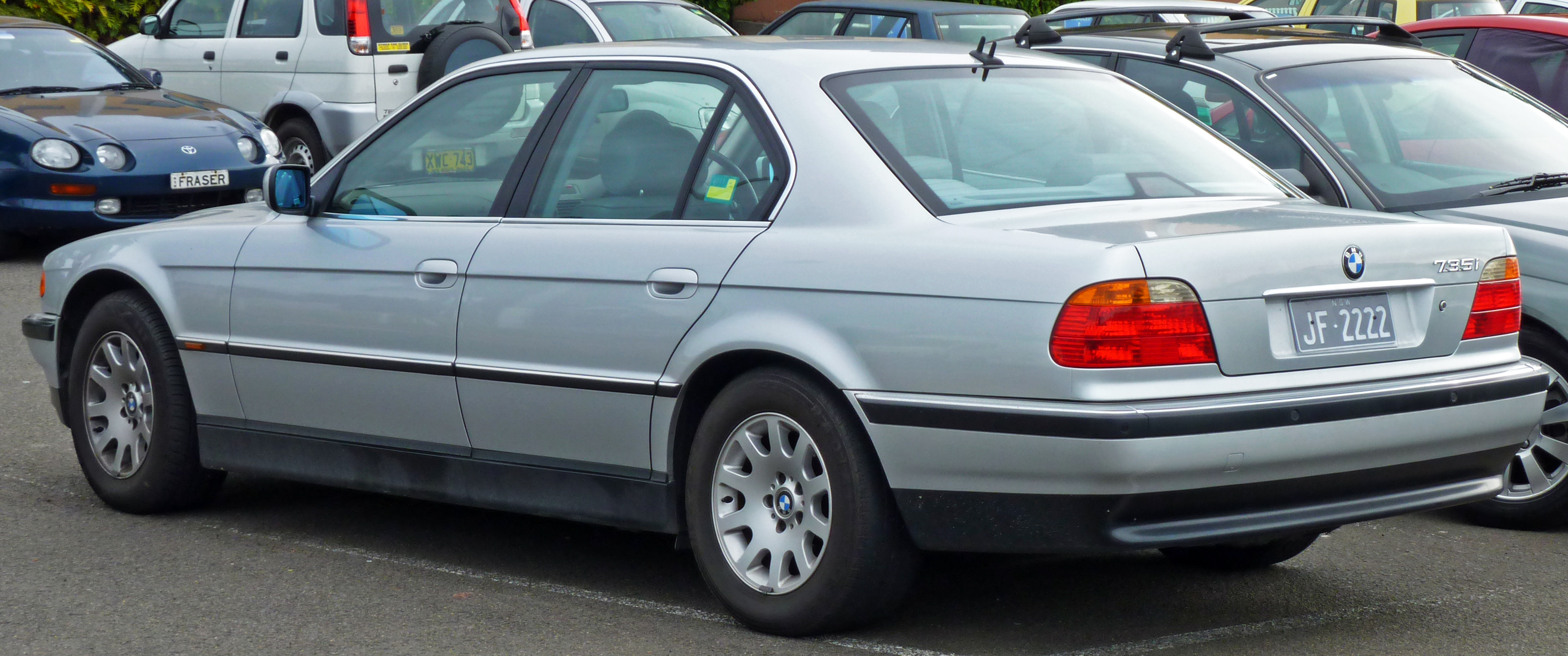
BMW 735i (Facelift)

The E38 is the third generation of the 7 Series, which was produced from 1994 to 2001. The model range consisted of standard length and long wheelbase ("iL" models) sedans.

The petrol engines available consisted of straight-six, V8 and V12 engines. The E38 was the first 7 Series to be available with a diesel engine; initially, a turbocharged straight-six, which was joined by a twin-turbocharged V8 in 1999.

The E38 was the first car available with curtain airbags. It was also the first European car to offer satellite navigation and the first BMW to offer an in-built television.

In 1999, the model received a facelift.

== Fourth generation (E65/E66/E67/E68; 2001) ==
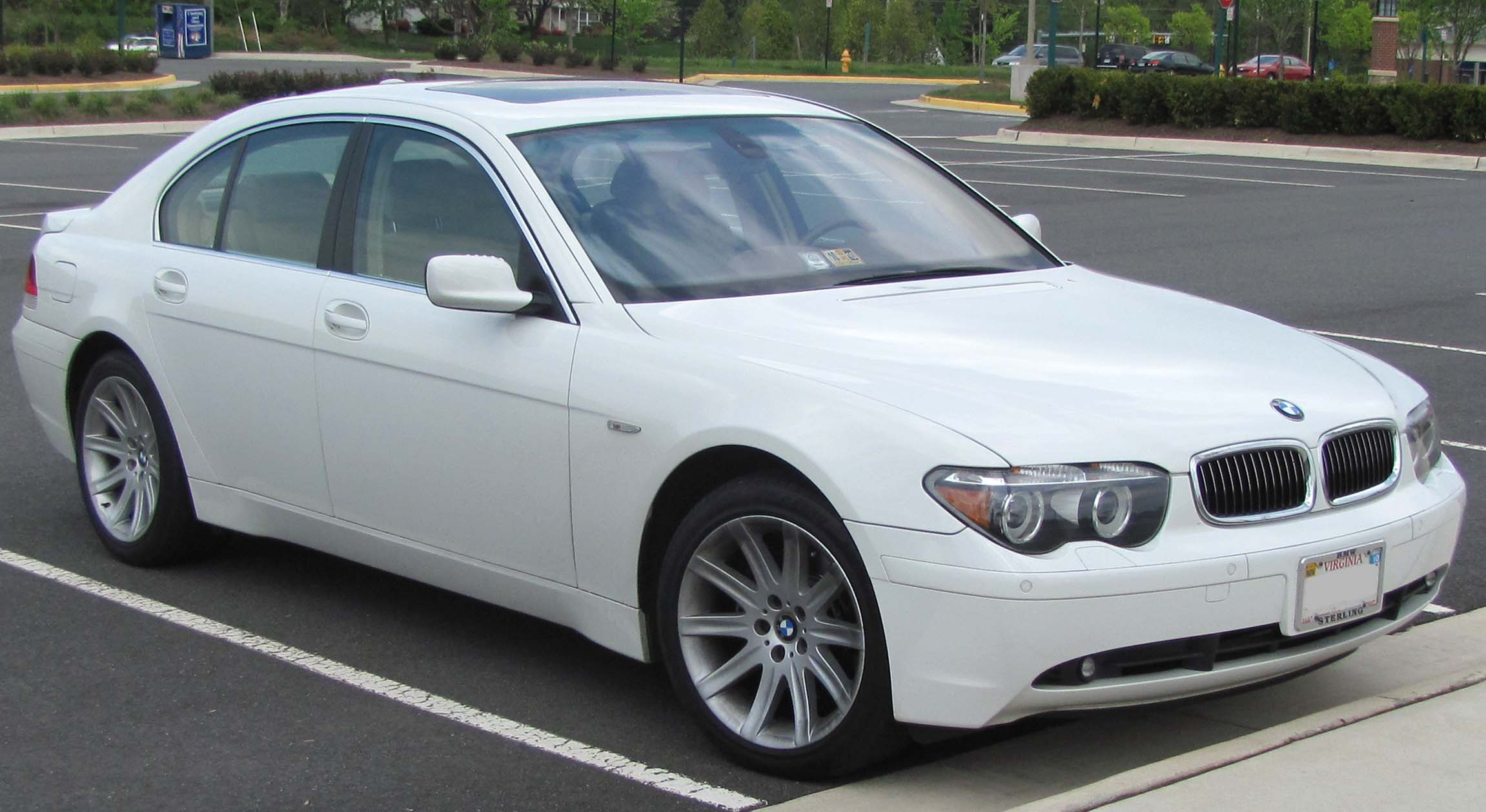
Pre-facelift BMW 745i sedan (US)

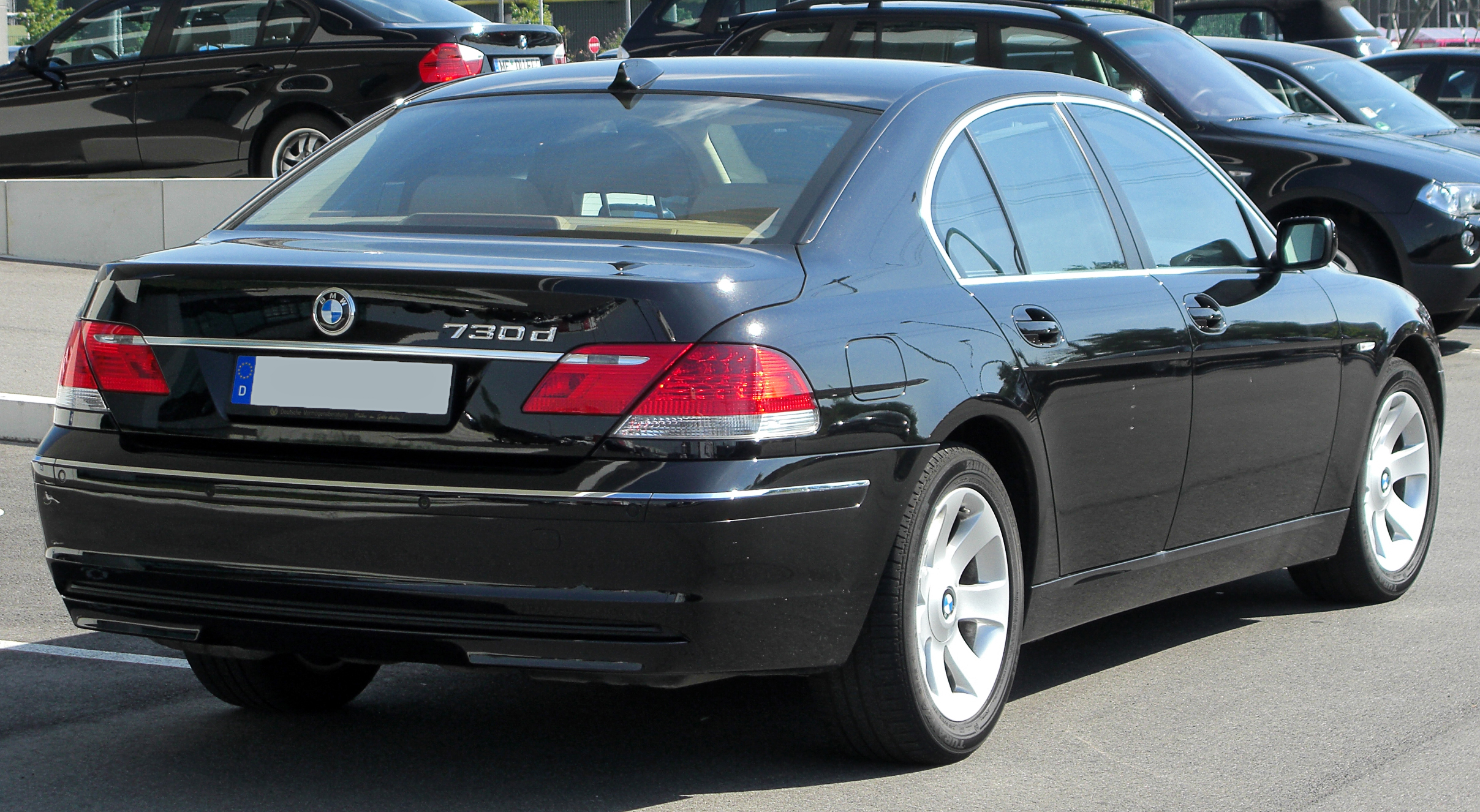
Facelifted BMW 730d (Germany)

The E65/E66/E67/E68 is the fourth generation 7 Series, which was produced from 2001 to 2008. The model range consisted of standard length and long wheelbase ("Li" models) sedans.

The E65/E66/E67/E68 was the first BMW to include iDrive, "flame-surfacing" exterior styling, active anti-roll bars, a 6-speed automatic transmission, an electronic smart Key (dispensing with the traditional metallic key) and night vision. The 760i model was the world's first production V12 engine to use direct injection.

== Fifth generation (F01/F02/F03/F04; 2008) ==
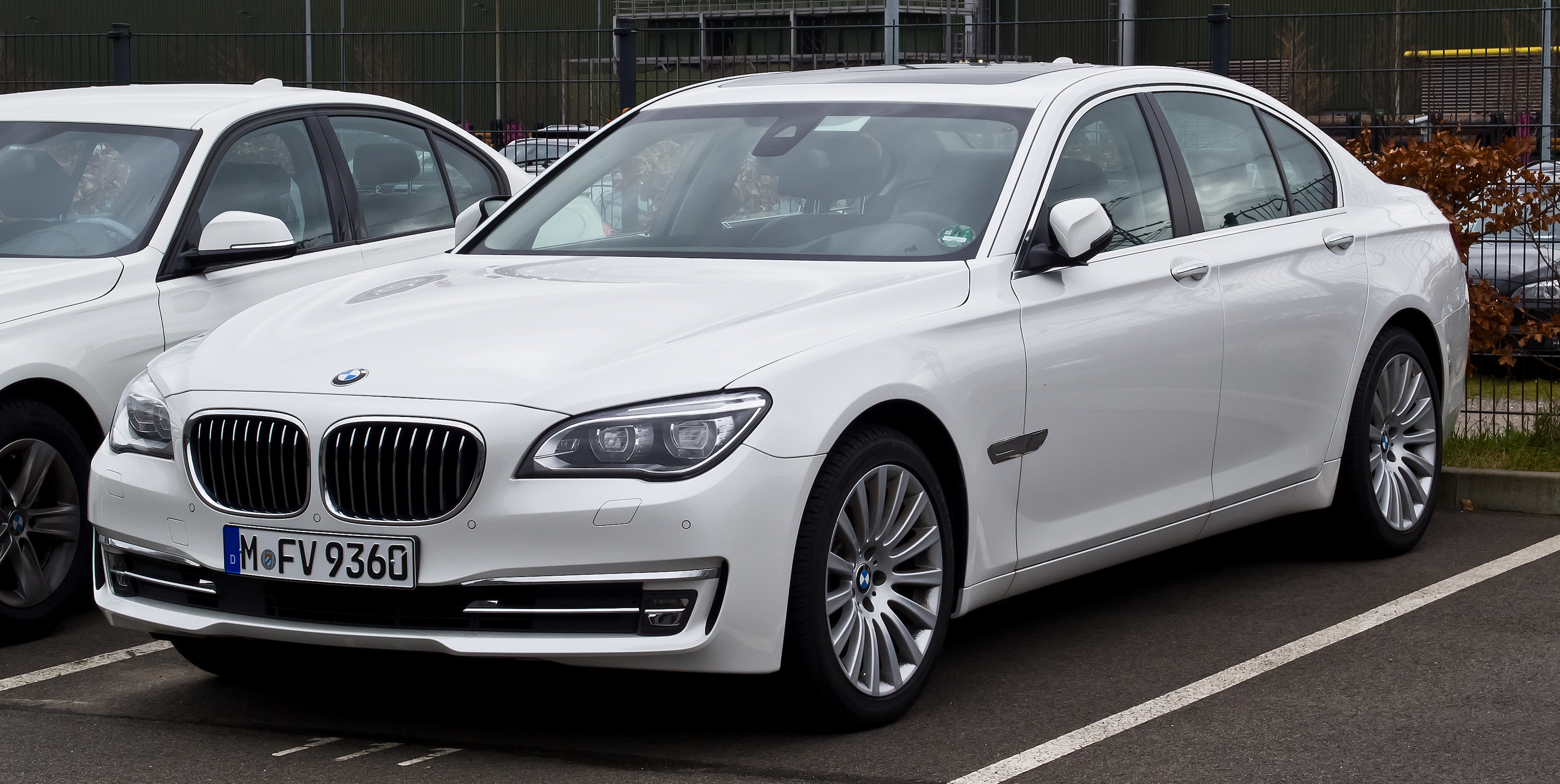
BMW 730d xDrive (Facelifted)

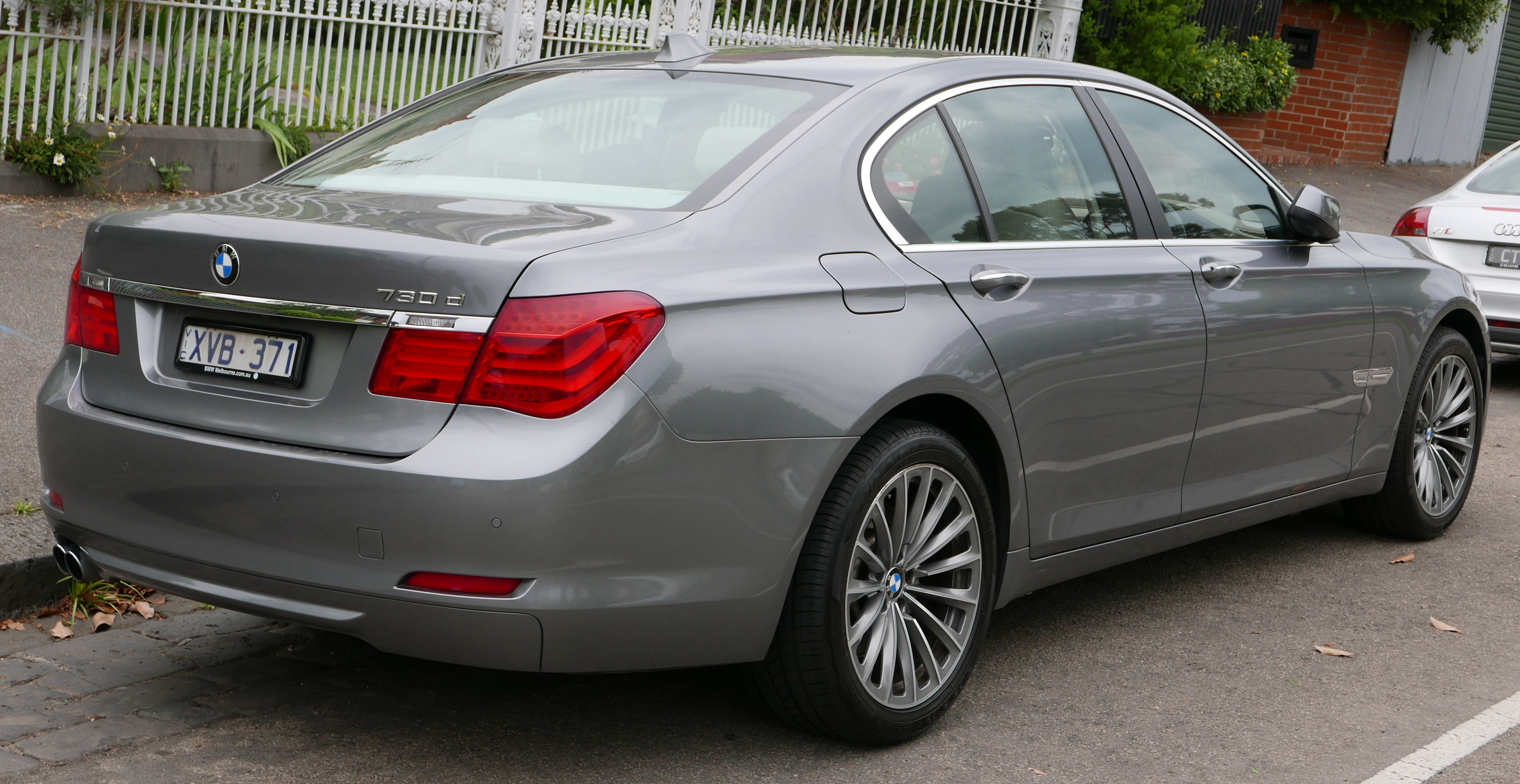
BMW 730d (Australia)

The F01/F02/F03/F04 is the fifth-generation 7 Series, which was produced from 2008 to 2015. The model range consisted of standard length and long wheelbase ("Li" models) sedans.

The F01 was the first BMW to be available with a hybrid drivetrain ("ActiveHybrid 7"), 8-speed automatic transmission, and a turbocharged V12 engine. It was also the first 7 Series to be available with a turbocharged petrol engine and all-wheel drive (xDrive).

In 2013, the model received a minor styling facelift.

== Sixth generation (G11/G12; 2015) ==
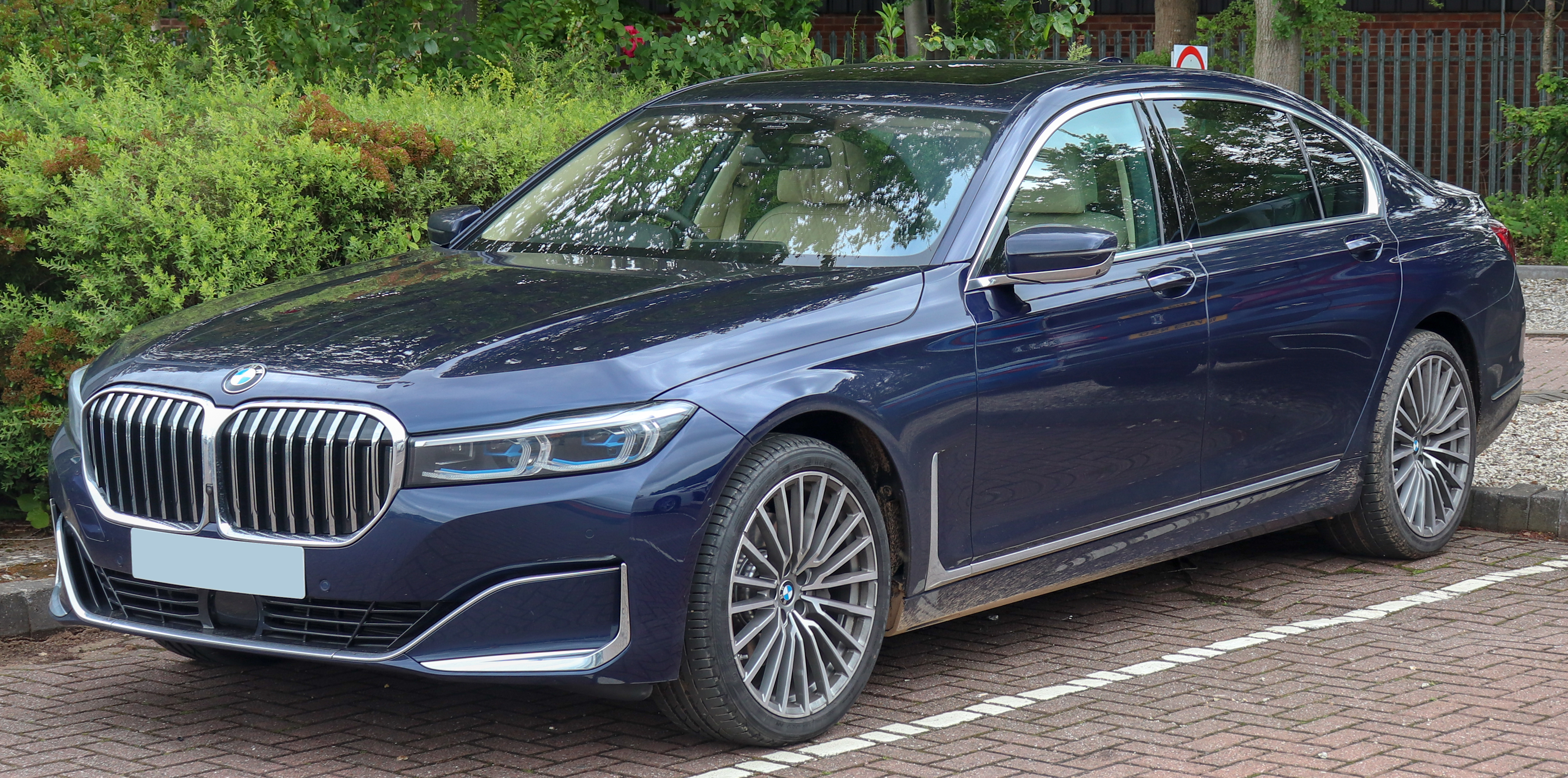
BMW 740Li (Facelifted)

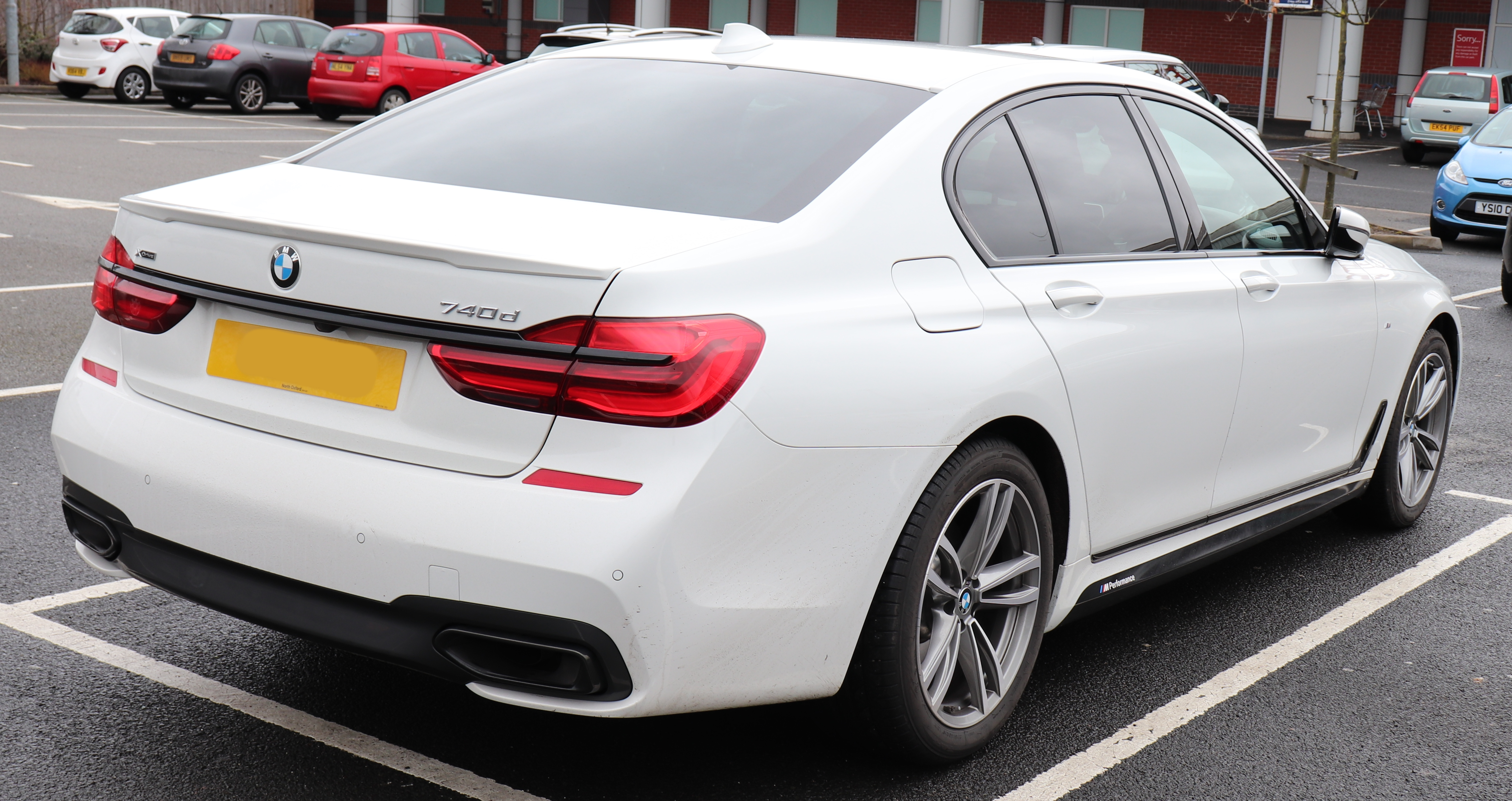
BMW 740d

The G11/G12 is the sixth generation of the 7 Series, which entered production in 2015. It was revealed on June 10, 2015, at BMW's headquarters in Munich. An official public reveal took place at the 2015 International Motor Show Germany.

G11 is the codename for the short-wheelbase model, the Long-wheelbase model is codenamed G12 and designated with an additional L letter.

The G11/G12 is the first car lineup of the BMW Group to be based on the modular OKL platform (Oberklasse, German for luxury class). The OKL platform adopts technology first introduced in BMW i models, namely the introduction of carbon-fiber-reinforced polymer as structural chassis components.

As part of BMW's strategy of introducing plug-in hybrid variants for all future car models, both, the short and long-wheelbase models became available with hybrid powertrains under the designations 740e and 740Le in 2016.

A LCI model appeared in 2019 which prominently features a larger grille.

== Seventh generation (G70/G73; 2022) ==
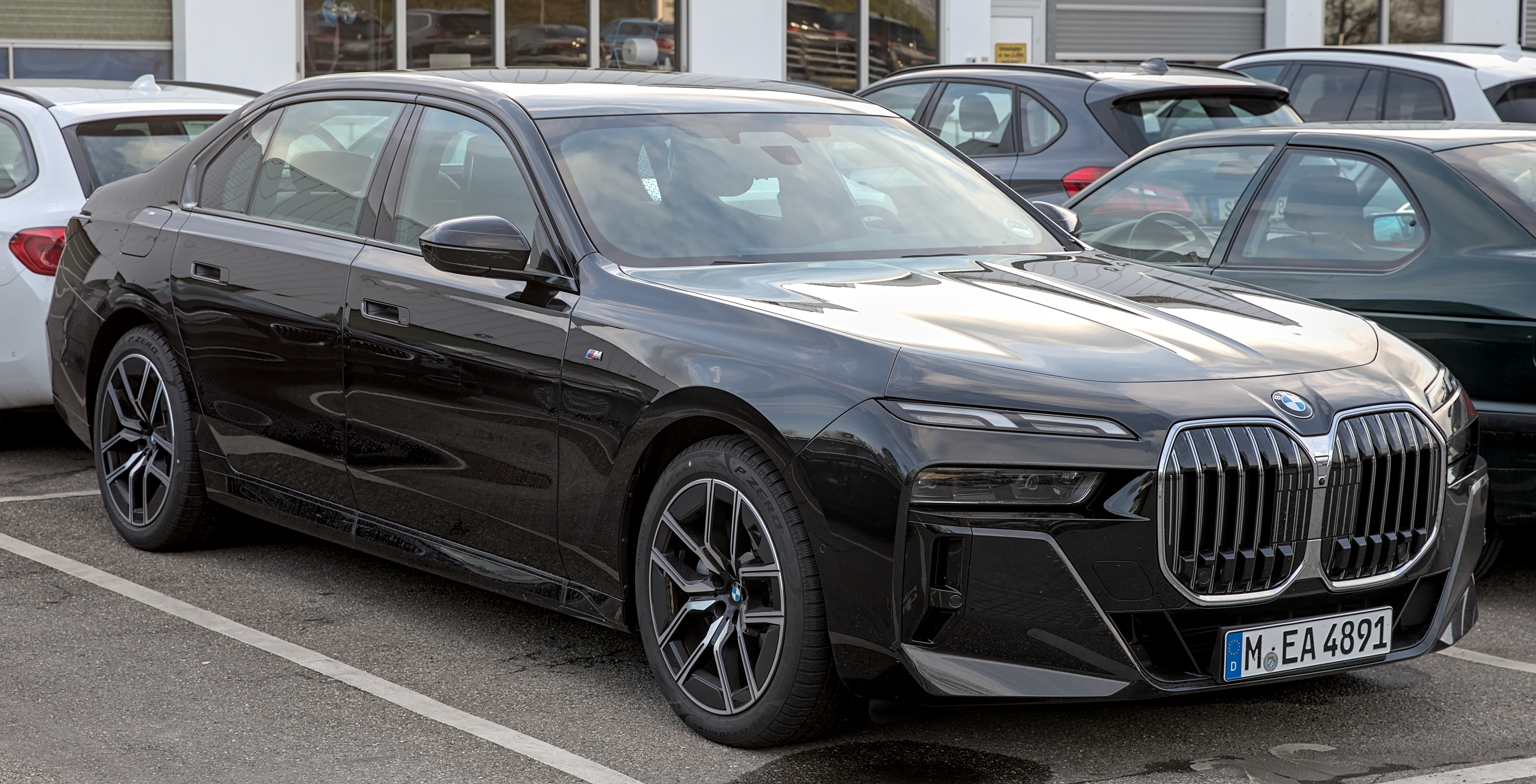
BMW 7 Series 740d

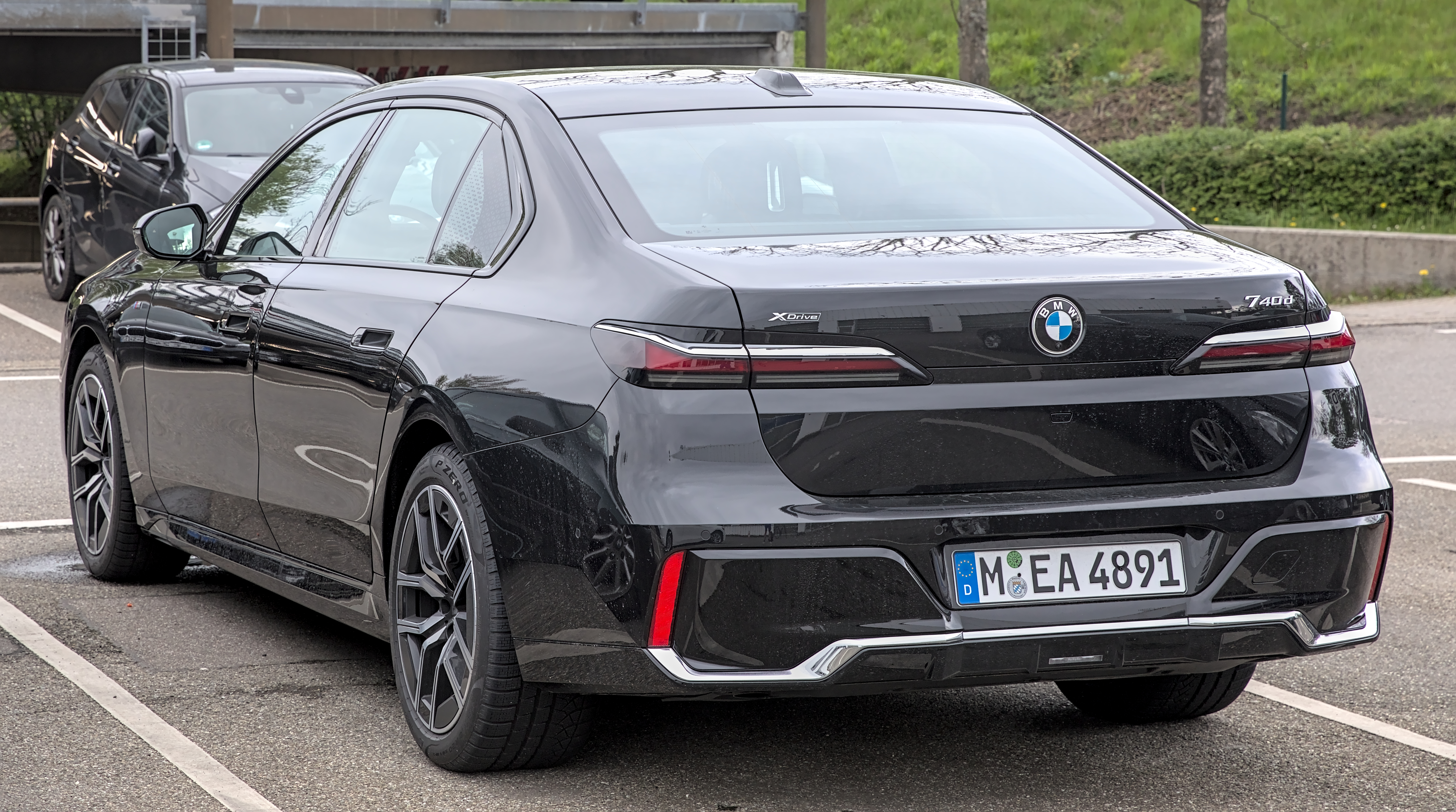
BMW 740d xDrive

The BMW G70 debuted in April 2022. It has an electric variant, the BMW i7, along with Inline 6 740i and V8 760i models. It adopts horizontally split headlight units featured on the X7 LCI which was also launched in April 2022. Engine options remain similar with 3.0-litre Inline 6 and 4.4-litre V8 options but no more V12 engines will be offered.

A facelifted version for the G70 7-Series (and i7) was unveiled on 22 April 2026 for the 2027 model year with sales beginning in summer 2026.

=== BMW i7 ===
The BMW i7 is an electric variant to the BMW 7 Series, which was unveiled alongside it on 17 April 2022. The i7 xDrive60 is powered by two electric motors generating a combined output of 536 hp (400 kW; 543 PS) and 553 lb⋅ft (750 N⋅m) of torque. It can accelerate 0-60 mph (0–97 km/h) in 4.5 seconds and EPA-range around 300–318 miles (483–512 km).

== Production and sales ==
Calendar year	Total production	Sales				
Calendar year	Total production	Europe	US	Canada	China	
Calendar year	Total production	Europe	US	Canada	7-series	i7
1995			22,637			
1996			22,775			
1997	49,700	21,601	-			
1998	47,300	19,459	-			
1999	43,000	17,866	18,233			
2000	39,000	13,424	16,619			
2001	32,749	10,716	13,389			
2002	53,504	16,050	22,006			
2003	57,899	14,905	20,473			
2004	47,689	13,071	16,155			
2005	50,062	12,505	18,165			
2006	50,227	11,884	17,796			
2007	44,421	8,280	14,773			
2008	38,835	8,017	12,276			
2009	52,680	12,534	9,254		16,006	
2010	65,814	9,599	12,253		26,553	
2011	68,774	9,200	11,299		33,500	
2012	59,184	8,173	11,098	755	26,808	
2013	56,001	5,980	10,932	373	25,916	
2014	48,519	5,307	9,744	374	21,896	
2015	36,364	5,985	9,292	358	13,692	
2016	61,514	13,320	12,918	626		
2017	64,311	11,533	9,276	546		
2018		9,552	8,271	441		
2019		9,248	8,823	375		
2020		6,346	5,985	188		
2021		5,235	7,705	181		
2022		4,196	5,974			
2023			10,811		12,628	1,288
2024			10,714		10,723	1,028
2025			11,393		9,528	929

Sales of hybrid-powered 7 Series models in the United States are as follows:

2010	2011	2012	2013	2014	2015	2016
101	338	231	-	45	12	1

== See also ==
- List of BMW vehicles
