= 1930 Montello tornado =

1930 IF5 tornado in Italy

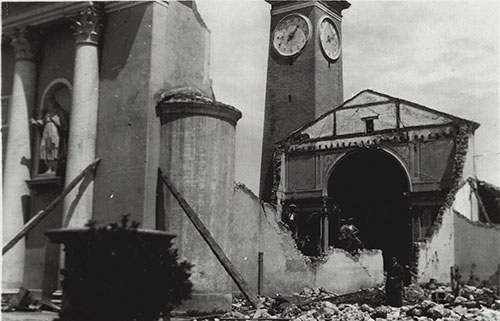
- IF4 damage to a large church in Volpago del Montello

Meteorological history
- Date: July 24, 1930; 96 years ago
- Formed: July 24, 1930, 1:08 pm. CDT (UTC−05:00)
- Dissipated: July 24, 1930, 1:43 pm. CDT (UTC−05:00)
- Duration: 35 minutes

IF5 tornado
- on the International Fujita scale

T10 tornado
- on the TORRO scale
- Highest winds: >270 mph (430 km/h)

Overall effects
- Fatalities: 23
- Injuries: 110
- Areas affected: Montello, Nervesa della Battaglia, Treviso and Udine
- Part of the Tornadoes of 1930

During the afternoon hours of Thursday July 24, 1930, a powerful tornado struck northeastern Italy, resulting in the deaths of 23 people and injuring another 110. The tornado caused extensive damage to several small communities from Treviso to Udine, with the village of Montello particularly affected.

The tornado is widely accepted to have been one of the strongest and most violent tornadoes in European history, causing some of the most intense tornado damage ever documented on the continent.

== Tornado summary ==
The tornado initially touched down northeast of Casoni at 1:08 p.m., causing extensive damage as it moved eastward through the town. It tracked for another mile before hitting Pozzetto at an estimated F4 intensity, destroying a church and causing ground scouring. The tornado passed just north of Ca' Onorai and Corte, narrowly missing both towns while still maintaining F4 intensity.

The tornado then impacted the northern portions of Mottinello Vecchio, damaging multiple warehouses and resulting in one fatality. It crossed a river and continued into Alberone from the west. The tornado shifted northward and rapidly intensified, reaching high-end F4 intensity as it narrowly missed Grande and Panevecco.

The tornado directly hit the small community of Castello di Godego, impacting multiple bars and warehouses with estimated F5 intensity, resulting in several fatalities. It destroyed a road in the community before continuing in a northward pattern. Moving on, it struck the southern portions of Muson, causing damage but fortunately no fatalities.

The tornado moved parallel to Via 27 Aprile before striking the town of Vallá at F5 intensity. Vallá suffered heavy damage, with power lines knocked over and roads becoming impassable. While in the town center, the tornado turned slightly more northward, narrowly avoiding a collision with the town of Fanzolo.

The tornado proceeded through less populated areas, avoiding collisions with small communities. It narrowly missed Busta, with significant ground scouring observed in the vicinity. As it crossed Via Santa Andrea, the tornado started to veer southward, bypassing Montebelluna by approximately 2.5 miles (4.0 km). Crossing several roads, it demolished a large church at F4 intensity before resuming a northward trajectory.

The tornado struck Volpago del Montello with F5 intensity, flattening well-built structures and sweeping an entire warehouse off its foundation. It caused multiple fatalities and injured 50 or more people. The tornado accelerated, creating deep ground scouring as it followed an erratic and unpredictable path.

The tornado then curved slightly southward, damaging various structures and uprooting multiple trees. It sharply turned upwards, striking Selva del Montello with retained F5 intensity. Several fatalities occurred, and a large church was destroyed. The tornado accelerated, narrowly missing several small communities, including Giavera del Montello. It crossed Via Arditi and proceeded through the northern portions of Bavaria at a lower intensity. It crossed a small stream and impacted multiple fields before passing through the center of Sovilla, causing significant damage to houses and other structures along its path.

The tornado continued northwestward, crossing a large river and impacting multiple small hamlets and villages at various intensities. In open crop fields, the ground scouring it left behind reached depths of at least 3 inches (7.6 cm). Passing through the small community of Sarano, it caused only minor damage to buildings before beginning to intensify once more.

The town of Capo di Sopra avoided a direct hit from the tornado, but damage was still documented in the area. The tornado caused intense damage to crops and trees. Shortly afterward, it entered the town limits of San Odorico and Sacile, tracking directly through the centers of both towns and causing severe damage. The tornado also damaged San Giovanni del Tempio, destroying houses and a commercial structure.

The tornado rapidly weakened east of the village of Talmasson, causing only minor damage to foliage and trees. It hit the center of Roverdo in Piano at a weak intensity, resulting in minor damage to structures and injuries to one or more people. The tornado then passed north of San Quirino and crossed a large river before dissipating at 1:43 p.m.

In total, the tornado tracked an estimated 50 miles (80 km) while maintaining high-end F4 and F5 intensity. It resulted in 23 fatalities, injured at least 110 others, and caused millions of dollars in damages.
