= Bavarian =

Bavarian is the adjective form of the German state of Bavaria, and refers to people of ancestry from Bavaria.

Bavarian may also refer to:

- Bavarii, a Germanic tribe
- Bavarians, a nation and ethnographic group of Germans
- Bavarian, Iran, a village in Fars Province
- Bavarian language, a West Germanic language

== See also ==
- Bavaria (disambiguation)
