= Osteria Ai Pioppi =

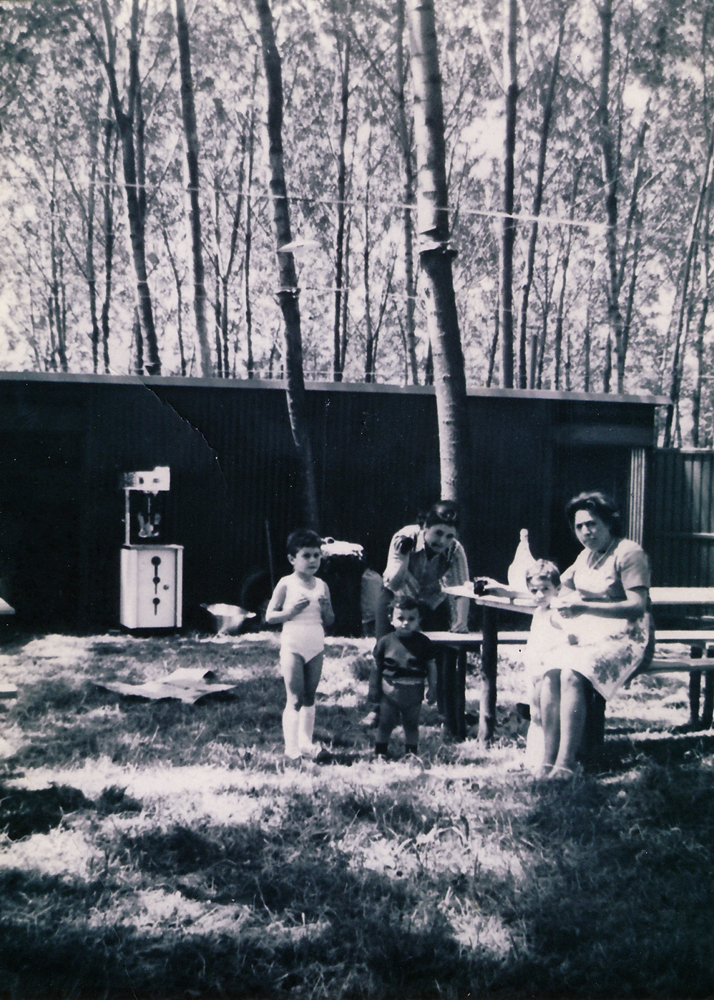
- Bruno, the founder and his family in 1969.

- Location within Italy

Restaurant information
- Established: June 15, 1969
- Rating: 4.4/5 on Google Maps
- Location: Via VIII Armata, 76, Nervesa della Battaglia, TV, 31040, Italy
- Coordinates: 45.843218°N 12.180442°E
- Website: http://aipioppi.com/

Osteria Ai Pioppi is a restaurant located in Nervesa della Battaglia, Italy. The restaurant's main attraction is a human-powered playground.

== History ==
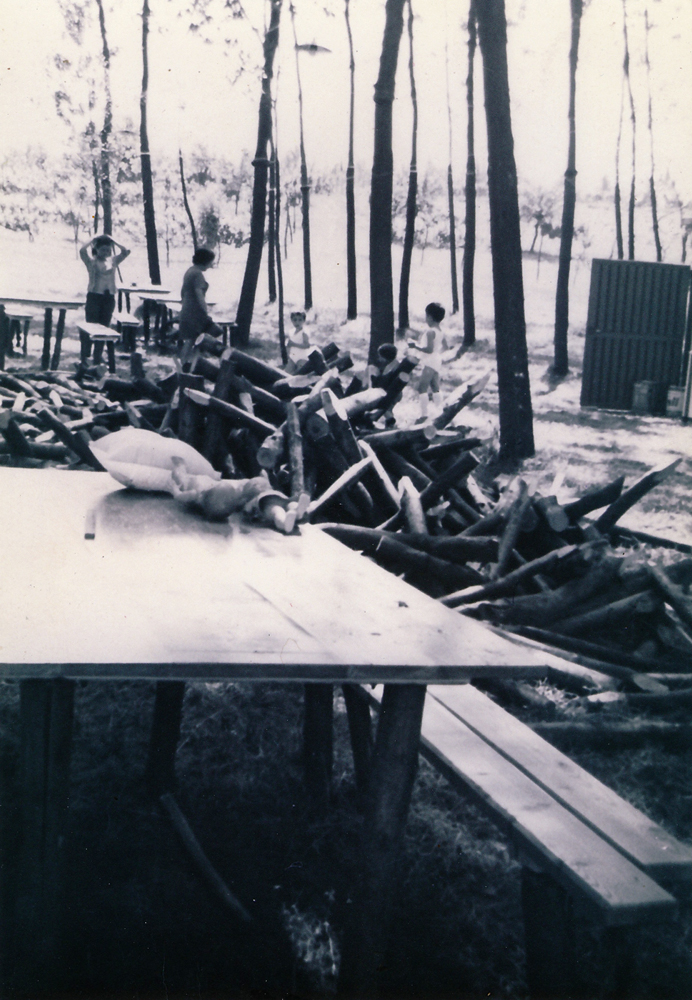
Bruno's hooks he created in 1969 that sparked his love of welding.

In 1969, the restaurant began as a small outdoor sausage and wine stand built by Bruno Ferrin. When Bruno needed hooks to hang sausages, he turned to a blacksmith, but was told he could make the hooks himself. This led to Bruno taking an interest in welding, and he began to weld pieces of metal together for the children who visited his restaurant. This welding project grew until Bruno had welded an entire amusement park of rides that were all human powered.

== Attractions ==
A list of attractions that can be found at the playground outside the restaurant includes:

- Death Ride
- Slide with Jumping
- 3-lane slide
- Vitruvian Man
- Roller Curve
- Ballerina
- Hill
- Bob

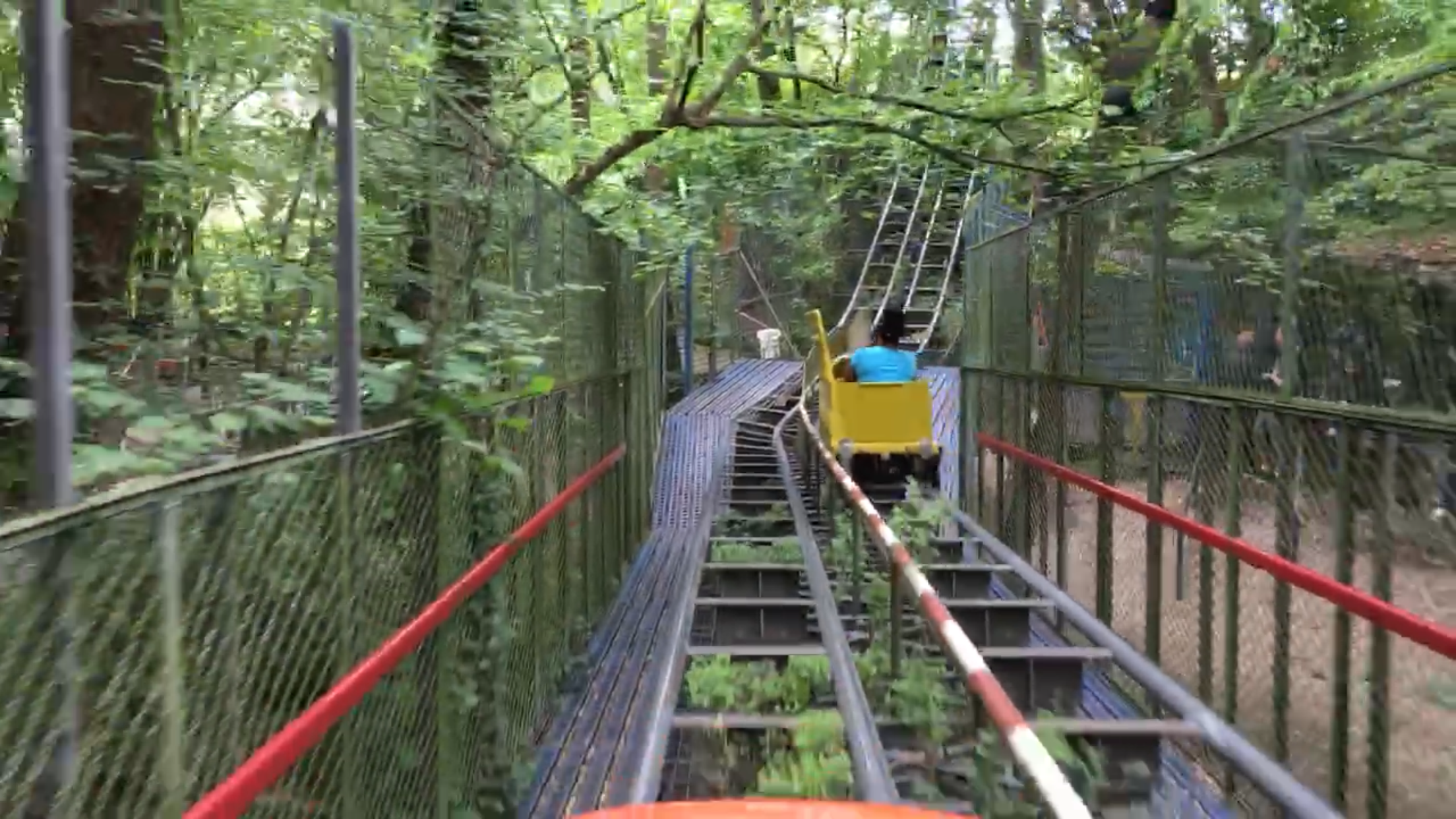
Attraction in Osteria ai Pioppi, 2017
