= Bavaria, Nervesa della Battaglia =

Coordinates: 45°48′25″N 12°11′14″E

Bavaria is a ward of the municipality of Nervesa della Battaglia in Treviso province. It's zip code is 31040.

The village has 1280 residents, is located 78 m asl and its inhabitants are called Bavariani.

== Physical Geography ==
The centre is located at the foot of the Montello, along the former road Schiavonesca SS 248, between the villages of Sovilla (east) and Giavera (west). The village is located about 22 km from Treviso and 3 km from Nervesa della Battaglia.

== History ==
Human presence dates back to ancient times: in Bavaria stone tools were found, among the oldest relics of the province, dating back to Mousterian (70.000-40.000 years ago). Human presence reappeared in the Montello 5th millennium BC.

Under Roman rule, Bavaria was a farming area.

Starting from 11th century a community of German origin, the Bavarians which the town was named after, gave rise to the current village.

During Venetian domination the forest of Montello was almost cleared and wood was taken to the port (such was the importance that the forest of Montello was ideally placed “within the arsenal”, the heart of Venetian power). During the First World War, in the years 1917 and 1918, the town was on the front line and its inhabitants were evacuated. Bavaria was razed and the reconstruction was very difficult. After the war, poverty was such that Bavaria and the whole area were addressed as the town of the sachet, alluding to the large number of poor people who, with a canvas bag in hand, meandered through the nearby towns to beg for a handful of cornmeal to make a simple polenta. Since the early '60 the area has developed a solid industrial and crafting network, extended to the entire Montello.

== Monuments and places of interest ==
=== Religious Buildings ===
==== Parish Church ====
St. Urban parish church has very ancient origins, previously part of the parish of Cusignana (as was the parish in Nervesa). Until 1593 it contained an altarpiece by Fiumicelli depicting various Saints. Originally, the side altars were dedicated to St. Urban and St. Vincent and the other altarpiece to St. Gotthard; later, the first was rededicated to the Resurrection and to Rosario, while the second was rededicated to St. Valentine. The marble main altar comes from the Certosa del Montello, demolished after the Napoleonic invasion. Around 1820 the building was expanded and supported by a belltower destroyed during the First World War. During the year 1939 the new church floor was completed. In 2008 the facade was beautifully restored.

==== Other Sacred Places ====
- Church of Our Lady of Fatima and St. Valentine: church-monument built in 1925 and named for Our Lady of Fatima and St. Valentine, town patron.
- Cave of St. Jerome: This is a small Chapel built by Zaccaria de' Zaccaria between 1813 and 1819, shortly after the demolition of the Certosa. It was built with materials salvaged from a 14th-century hermitage site in the valley, one of the three potential sources on the Montello upon which the Certosa itself could have originated. Severely damaged during the Great War and subsequently neglected, it was restored in the 1990s by local Alpini volunteers.

=== Civilian buildings ===
==== Palazzo Sfoglio Antolini ====
An example of a classic Villa Veneta, Palazzo Sfoglio-Antolini dates back to 1825. The building was damaged during the First World War, even used as a factory for part of its life, it was eventually sold by the Vatican in the 1960s. In the last decade, the Villa has benefited from a major restoration and conservation effort.

Facing the canal, the privately owned home consists of a central building with two mezzanine floors and a barchessa, positioned as a wing addition with arches and external frescoes.

On the inside, the large main hall has frescoes attributed to Giambattista Canale (1745–1825), son of Fabio Canale (1703–1767) and a relative of Antonio Canale (known as Canaletto). Other local examples of his artistry can be found at the parish church in Caerano San Marco and Palazzo Labia near Venice.

== Sports ==
The Bavaria sport facility is home to Nervesa's basketball team, known as Pallacanestro Nervesa, as well as the Futsal team, called Atletico Nervesa, formerly United Nervesarcade after merging with the nearby team in Arcade, Italy. The new football grounds are occasionally used by the Nervesa team, Football Club Nervesa, but is also host to various youth soccer-football tournaments, drawing players from throughout the province of Treviso. During the 2009 parish festival, the final of the Italian tug of war Championship was held on the football grounds. At each annual parish festival, 5 km and 10 km running events are organized on the scenic Montello.

== Festivals ==
Since 1986 a traditional Sagra, or rural festival, dedicated to the Madonna della Certosa (‘The Madonna of the Carthusian monastery’) has taken place at the end of July. In the past there was also a festival of Saint Valentine in mid-February.

== Related items ==
- Nervesa della Battaglia
- Montello
- St. Urban
- St. Valentine
