= Bavarian, Iran =

Bavarian باوريان
- Village
- Location within Iran
- Coordinates: 29°04′24″N 52°33′03″E
- Country: Iran
- Province: Fars
- County: Firuzabad
- Bakhsh: Meymand
- Rural District: Khvajehei

Population (2006)
  - Total: 459
- Time zone: UTC+3:30 (IRST)
  - Summer (DST): UTC+4:30 (IRDT)

Bavarian (Persian: باوريان, also Romanized as Bāvarīān, Bāvareyān, Bāvarīyān, and Bāvaryān) is a village in Khvajehei Rural District, Meymand District, Firuzabad County, Fars province, Iran. At the 2006 census, its population was 459, in 124 families.
