= Emily Bavar =

American journalist known for Walt Disney exposé

- Born: Emily Bavar; 1915
- Died: July 28, 2003 (aged 87–88)
- Other names: Emily Bavar Kelly
- Occupation: Journalist

Emily Bavar (1915 - July 28, 2003), later Emily Bavar Kelly, was an American reporter for The Sentinel Star, the newspaper which later became The Orlando Sentinel. She is best known for her story which speculated that Walt Disney was behind the secret purchase of large parcels of land in central Florida, which became Walt Disney World.

In 1965, Disneyland planned a year-long celebration of its ten-year anniversary, nicknamed the "Tencennial". Reporters from across America were flown to Anaheim and entertained by Disney, in exchange for their coverage of the celebration. The Southeast was not a focus area for this project, however due to the sizable circulation of The Sentinel Star, a reporter was invited to attend the celebration. That reporter was Emily Bavar, editor of the paper's Sunday Florida magazine.

Her instructions from her boss were to ask Walt Disney if there was truth to the rumors that he was behind the land purchase in central Florida. Bavar first posed her question to Disney's publicist, Charles Ridgway, who responded "Beats me. You'll have to ask Walt tomorrow at lunch." (He was not bluffing; Ridgway was actually unaware that Disney was purchasing the land.)

Bavar later recalled that when she did ask Disney the question, "He looked like I had thrown a bucket of water in his face."

Following the press conference, Bavar wired her story back to Orlando. The story, entitled "Disney Hedges Big Question", was run not as a lead story, but rather among many other rumors about the possible use for the land. Upon Bavar's return to Orlando, she was interviewed by newspaper editors and the newspaper decided to give her findings a more prominent place in the paper.

On October 21, 1965, Bavar's article 'Is Our "Mystery" Industry Disneyland?' appeared in The Sentinel Star. The story stated several times Bavar had not confirmed the purchase with Disney, nor with anyone involved in the sale, and was based solely on Bavar's opinion.

On Sunday, October 24, 1965, The Sentinel Star ran a larger follow-up to Bavar's piece - 'We Say: "Mystery" Industry Is Disney." This headline caught the attention of several of Disney's closest confidants who immediately phoned him in California. Disney knew that he must respond quickly to the claims. The following Monday, Disney met with Florida Governor Haydon Burns to confirm the rumors and Burns announced in Miami "Walt Disney has extended to your governor the privilege of making the official announcement that Disney Productions is the mystery industry."

On November 15, 1965, at 2pm, Disney, along with his brother Roy O. Disney and Burns, held a press conference at the Cherry Plaza Hotel in Orlando to formally announce to the press that they had indeed purchased 47 square miles (120 km^{2}) of land in Central Florida for building an entertainment venture.
