= Montello (hill) =

Hill in Italy

Coordinates: 45°48′34″N 12°05′47″E

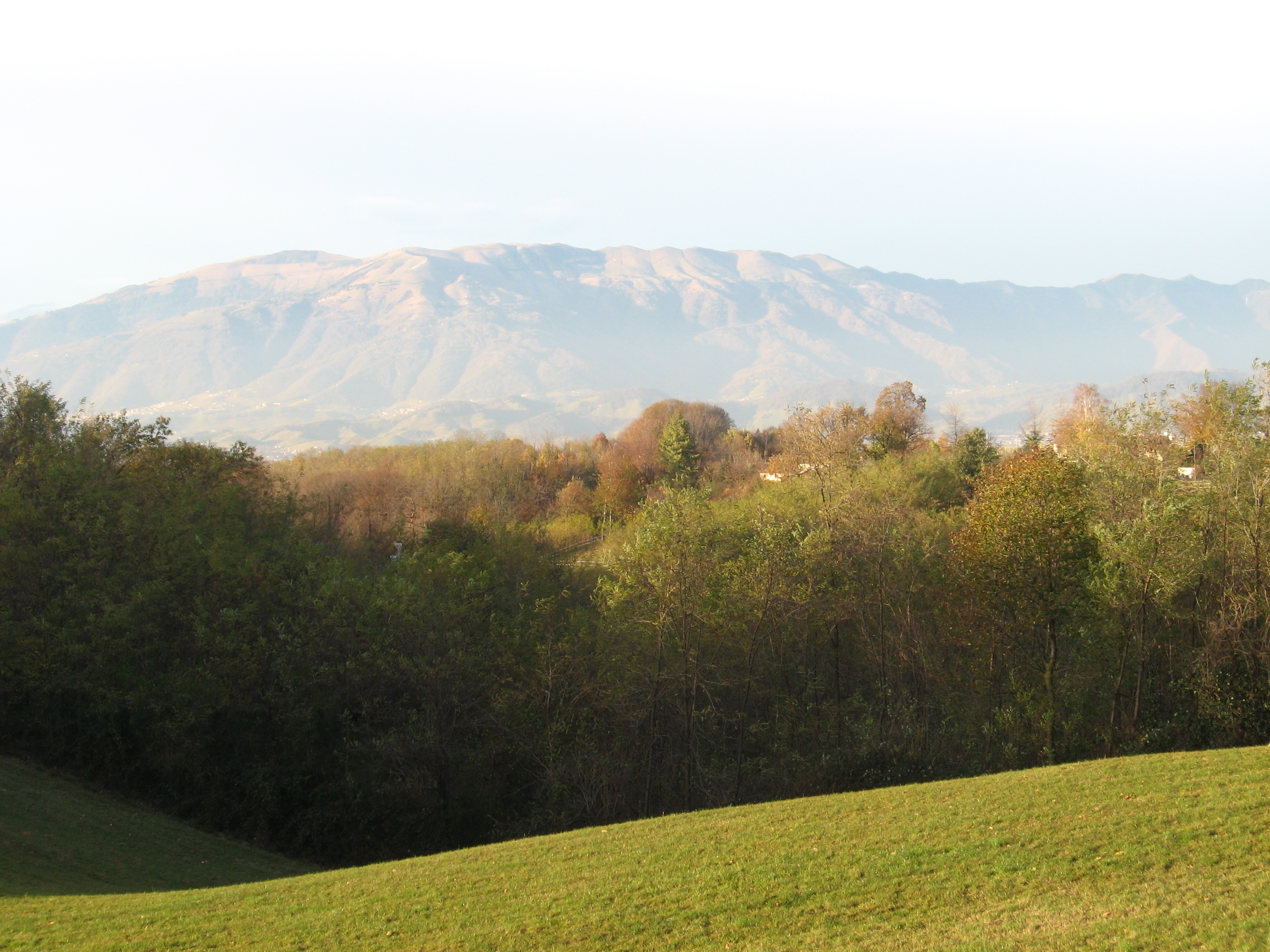
View from Montello towards the Alps

Montello is a hill in the province of Treviso, Veneto, northern Italy, and the site of a World War I battle.

The bean-shaped hill measures about 5 km north–south by 13 km east–west. It rises to a maximum of 371 m elevation from the alluvial plain of the Piave River, which runs along the north and west edges of the hill, at about 140 m elevation.

Montello is crossed in the east-west direction by a local road that begins as Via 18 Giugno in the town of Pederiva di Biadene, continues as Strada La Dorsale and Via Frati, and ends as Via Ossario in the town of Nervesa della Battaglia. Several local roads in the general north-south direction connect this "dorsal spine" of the Montello to the two main alternative routes around the hill, either along on its southern margin (comprised by Stradone del Bosco, Via Fra Giocondo, Via Pedemontana, Via Francesco Baracca, Via Arditi, Via Armando Diaz) or along the northern margin (the Panoramic Road, comprised by Via Gabriele d'Annunzio, Via Nord Montello, Via Riviera Piave, Via Decima Armata).

The hill gave its name to several towns nested against its base Crocetta del Montello, Montebelluna, Volpago del Montello, Giavera del Montello, and Nervesa della Battaglia.

The hill is covered with a mix of wooded areas, residential homes, and small farms. The church and monument of Santa Maria della Vittoria, built after the battle of 1918, is located on top of Montello, about 3.5 km north of Volpago (to which it belongs) and 5 km east from Pederiva.

== History ==
Montello has been inhabited since pre-historical times; chipped stone points from the Mesolithic have been found along the northern edge. The early inhabitants probably occupied the many natural caves that bore into the hill.

In Classical Antiquity the region surrounding Montello was settled by reformed soldiers of the Roman army.

During the Middle Ages, the Certosa (Carthusian monastery) of San Gerolamo and the abbey of Sant'Eustachio were built. It was in the latter that, between 1550 and 1555, Giovanni Della Casa wrote Il Galateo.

The oaks and chestnut trees that covered Montello since antiquity used to be a major source of timber for the region, especially for the shipyards and building foundations of Venice. Due to its strategic importance, the Republic of Venice assumed the ownership of the hill, and declared it off-limits to the local population. Deprived of their homes and their main source of income, the hunters and woodsmen of Montello became a class of landless, homeless and jobless miserables, the bisnenti (the 'twice have-nots'), who survived on odd jobs and occasionally crimes. Eventually, many locals took to the roads of emigration, in the Americas, France, Germany and Australia.

In 1892, moved by the plight of the bisnenti, Senator Pietro Bertolini pushed through legislation which parcelled Montello land among them. The initiative was not very successful, since the poor soil was not very suitable for agriculture. In any case, the re-settlement and the ravages of World War I led to the demise of the native woods, and their partial replacement by robinias, a bush native to the Americas that was brought to the region in the late 18th century.

On 24 July 1930, the Montello area was affected by an extremely violent tornado, probably the strongest in Europe in historical times, with gusts estimated at 500 km/h and an estimated ranking of F5 on the Fujita scale. It was strong enough to level masonry buildings, and it caused the death of at least 21 people.

== See also ==
- magicoveneto.it
