= Bavaria non-alcoholic beer =

Non-alcoholic beer

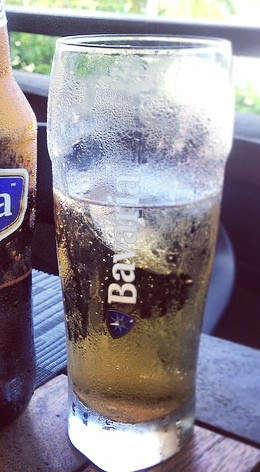
- Type: Non-alcoholic beer
- Manufacturer: Bavaria Brewery
- Alcohol by volume: 0.0%

Bavaria non-alcoholic beer is a non-alcoholic beer (0.0% ABV) brewed by the Bavaria Brewery. Also known as Royal Swinkels Family Brewers who describe the beer as follows; “Bavaria 0.0% Original has a distinct beer flavour: malt and sweet of the various types of malt used. The aroma is slightly hop-like, malty and fruity. The aftertaste is a smooth malty sweetness and pleasant bitterness”.

Like many non-alcoholic beers, sales have recently been increasing rapidly, for example Waitrose reported increases of 11% year on year in 2011.
