= Peykaap II-class missile boat =

Class of fast patrol craft

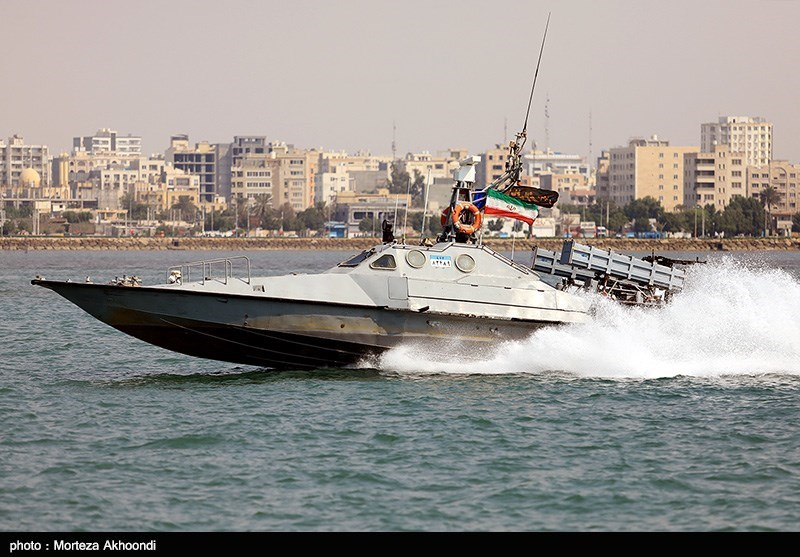

Class overview
- Operators: Navy of the Islamic Revolutionary Guard Corps

General characteristics
- Type: Fast patrol craft
- Displacement: 14 tons
- Length: 17.3 m (56 ft 9 in)
- Beam: 3.75 m (12 ft 4 in)
- Draught: 0.7 m (2 ft 4 in)
- Installed power: 2 × diesel engines, 2,400 horsepower (1.8 MW)
- Propulsion: 1 × propeller
- Speed: 52 knots (96 km/h; 60 mph)
- Complement: 3
- Armament: 2 × single anti-ship missile launchers; 2 × 324 mm torpedo tubes

Bavar (Persian: باور, lit. 'belief', also known as Peykaap II) is a class of fast patrol craft which is capable of firing both anti-ship missile and torpedo, and is operated by the Navy of the Islamic Revolutionary Guard Corps of Iran.

As of 2014, the boats are made available for export.

== Design ==
Peykaap II is a modified version of North Korean IPS-16, manufactured by Iran. It is slightly larger than Peykaap I class.

=== Dimensions and machinery ===
The ships have an estimated standard displacement of 14 t (14 long tons). The class design is 17.3 m (56 ft 9 in) long, would have a beam of 3.75 m (12 ft 4 in) and a draft of 0.7 m (2 ft 4 in). It uses one surface piercing propeller, powered by two diesel engines. This system was designed to provide 2,400 horsepower (1,800 kW) for an estimated top speed of 52 knots (96 km/h; 60 mph).

=== Armament ===
Peykaap II crafts are equipped with two single anti-ship missile launchers with Kowsar or Nasr, which rely on internal guidance and active terminal homing to 38 kilometres (21 nmi) at 0.8 Mach, as well as two single 324 mm (12.8 in) torpedo tubes. It is also compatible with Chinese C-701/FL-10 anti-ship missiles.
