= Baverd =

Baverd باورد
- Village
- Location within Iran
- Coordinates: 26°43′21″N 54°53′36″E
- Country: Iran
- Province: Hormozgan
- County: Bandar Lengeh
- Bakhsh: Central
- Rural District: Howmeh

Population (2006)
  - Total: 1,077
- Time zone: UTC+3:30 (IRST)
  - Summer (DST): UTC+4:30 (IRDT)

Baverd (Persian: باورد, also Romanized as Bāverd and Bāvard; also known as Bavar, and Būr) is a village in Howmeh Rural District, in the Central District of Bandar Lengeh County, Hormozgan Province, Iran. At the 2006 census, its population was 1,077, in 223 families.
