= Nervesa della Battaglia =

- Comune
- Comune di Nervesa della Battaglia
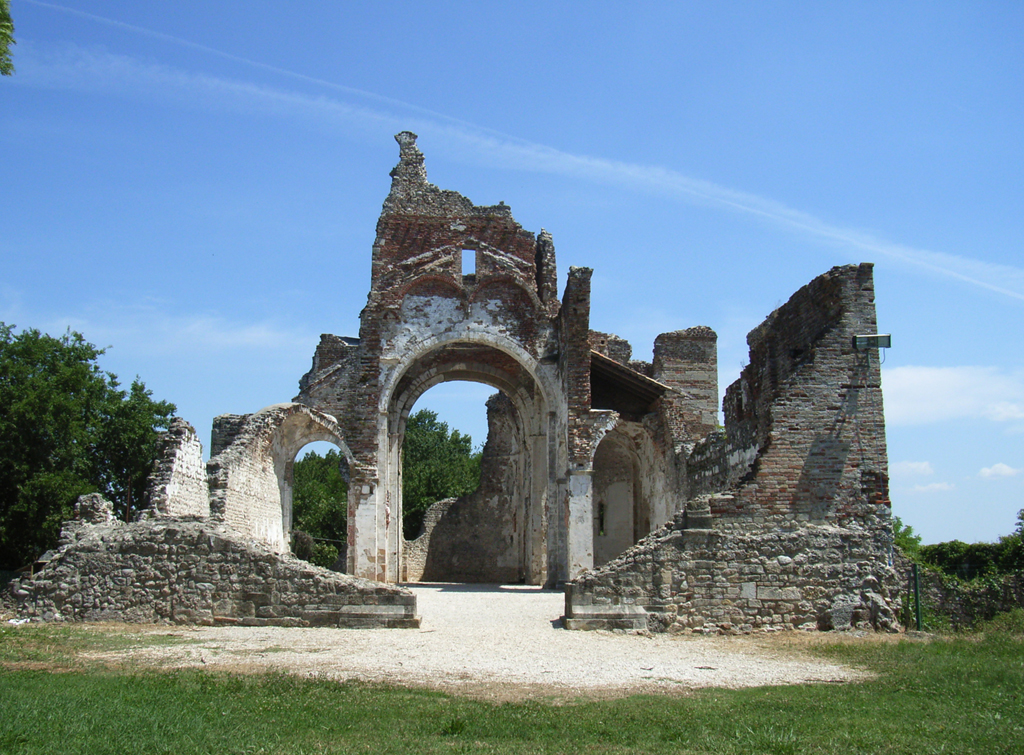
- Remains of the Abbey of Sant'Eustachio.

- Coat of arms

- Location within Italy Location within Veneto
- Coordinates: 45°50′N 12°13′E
- Country: Italy
- Region: Veneto
- Province: Treviso (TV)
- Frazioni: Sovilla, Bidasio

Government
  - Mayor: Fabio Vettori

Area
  - Total: 34.97 km^{2} (13.50 sq mi)
- Elevation: 78 m (256 ft)

Population (31 December 2022)
  - Total: 6,556
  - Density: 187.5/km^{2} (485.6/sq mi)
- Demonym: Nervesani
- Time zone: UTC+1 (CET)
  - Summer (DST): UTC+2 (CEST)
- Postal code: 31040
- Dialing code: 0422
- Patron saint: St. Jerome
- Saint day: 30 September
- Website: Official website

Nervesa della Battaglia is a comune (municipality) in the Province of Treviso in the Italian region Veneto, located about 45 kilometres (28 mi) north of Venice and about 20 kilometres (12 mi) north of Treviso.

In February 1358 Nervesa was the scene of a battle in which the Republic of Venice was defeated by the forces of King Louis I of Hungary. That defeat forced the Venetians to sign the highly unfavorable Treaty of Zadar.

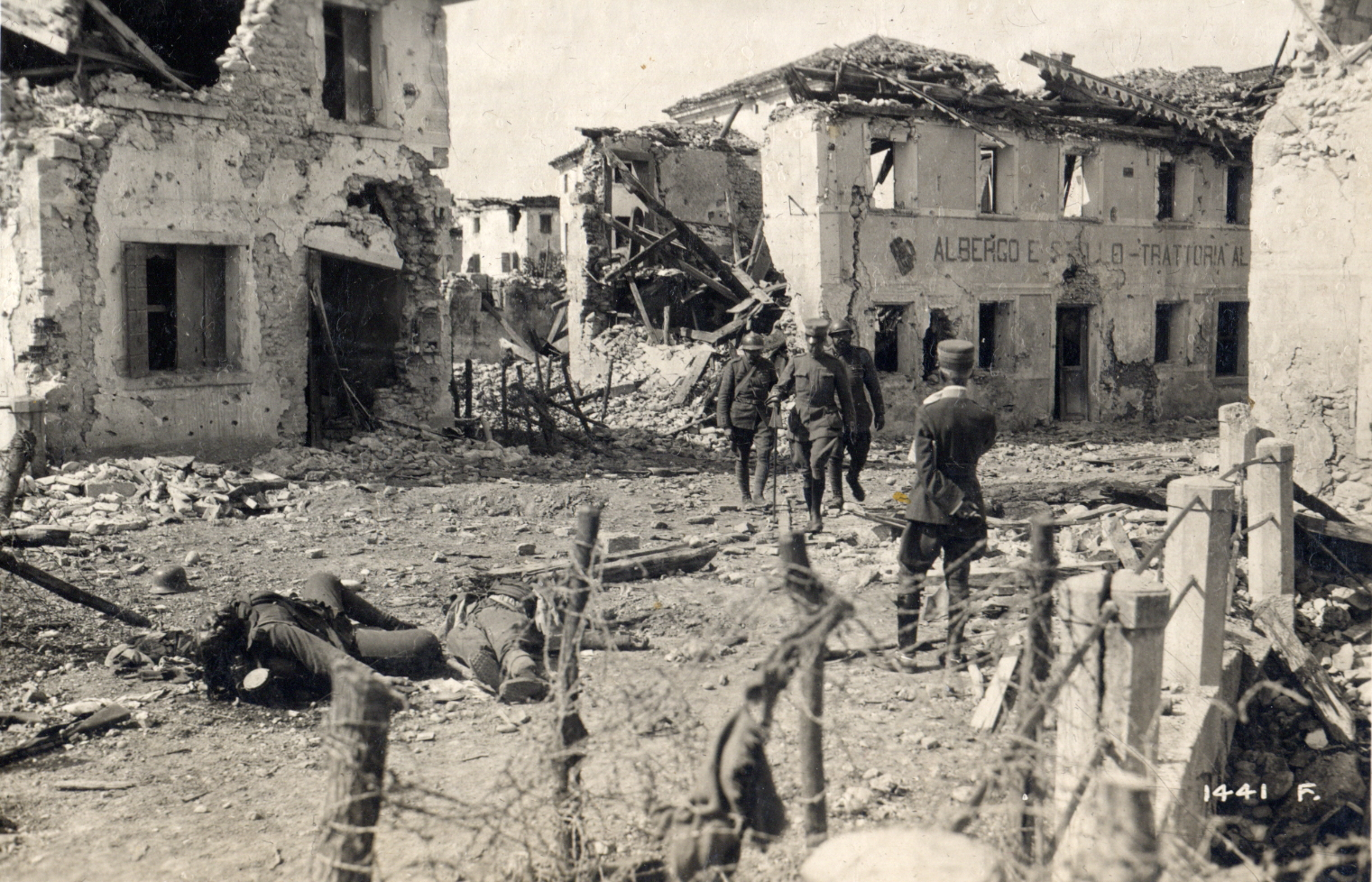
Italian officers inspect Nervesa after Italian forces retook it on 24 June 1918.

Sites include the remains of the Abbey of Sant'Eustachio, near the Piave river, which reached its apex in the 13th century. It was abandoned in 1865, and heavily damaged during the Battle of the Piave River in World War I. Another disappeared convent is the Charterhouse of San Girolamo, located on the Montello hill.

== Demographic evolution ==
Historical population

Year	Pop.	±%
1861	?	—
1871	4,743	—
1881	4,647	−2.0%
1901	5,096	+9.7%
1911	5,959	+16.9%
1921	6,463	+8.5%

Year	Pop.	±%
1931	6,212	−3.9%
1936	5,764	−7.2%
1951	5,983	+3.8%
1961	5,568	−6.9%
1971	5,539	−0.5%
1981	5,934	+7.1%

Year	Pop.	±%
1991	6,517	+9.8%
2001	6,663	+2.2%
2011	6,841	+2.7%
2021	6,543	−4.4%

Source: Data from ISTAT

=== Foreign ethnicities and minorities ===
As of December 31, 2022, foreigners residents in the municipality were 591, i.e. 9.0% of the population. The largest groups are shown below:

1. Romania 159
2. Morocco 135
3. China 30
4. Kosovo 23
5. Ukraine 20
6. Albania 19
7. North Macedonia 17

== Economy ==
The economy is based on a highly developed industrial sector, which continues to be supported by the agricultural sector. Cereals, wheat, vegetables, fodder, vines and fruit trees are grown and cattle, pigs and poultry are raised. Industrial production is developed in the mining (stone), food, textile, clothing, chemical, metallurgical and construction sectors.

== Twin towns ==
Nervesa della Battaglia is twinned with:

- Lugo, Italy, since 1968

== Main sights ==
The town contains Ai Pioppi, a human-powered playground outside of a restaurant created by the restaurant's owner.

== See also ==
- Bavaria (Nervesa della Battaglia)
