= Lake Bavaria =

Lake in the state of Minnesota, United States

- Location within Minnesota
- Location: Carver County, Minnesota
- Coordinates: 44°50′15″N 93°38′25″W
- Type: Lake
- Etymology: Bavaria, Germany

Lake Bavaria is a lake in Carver County, Minnesota, in the United States.

Lake Bavaria was named after the German state of Bavaria, the native homeland of some of the first settlers.

== See also ==
- List of lakes in Minnesota
