= BMW E3 =

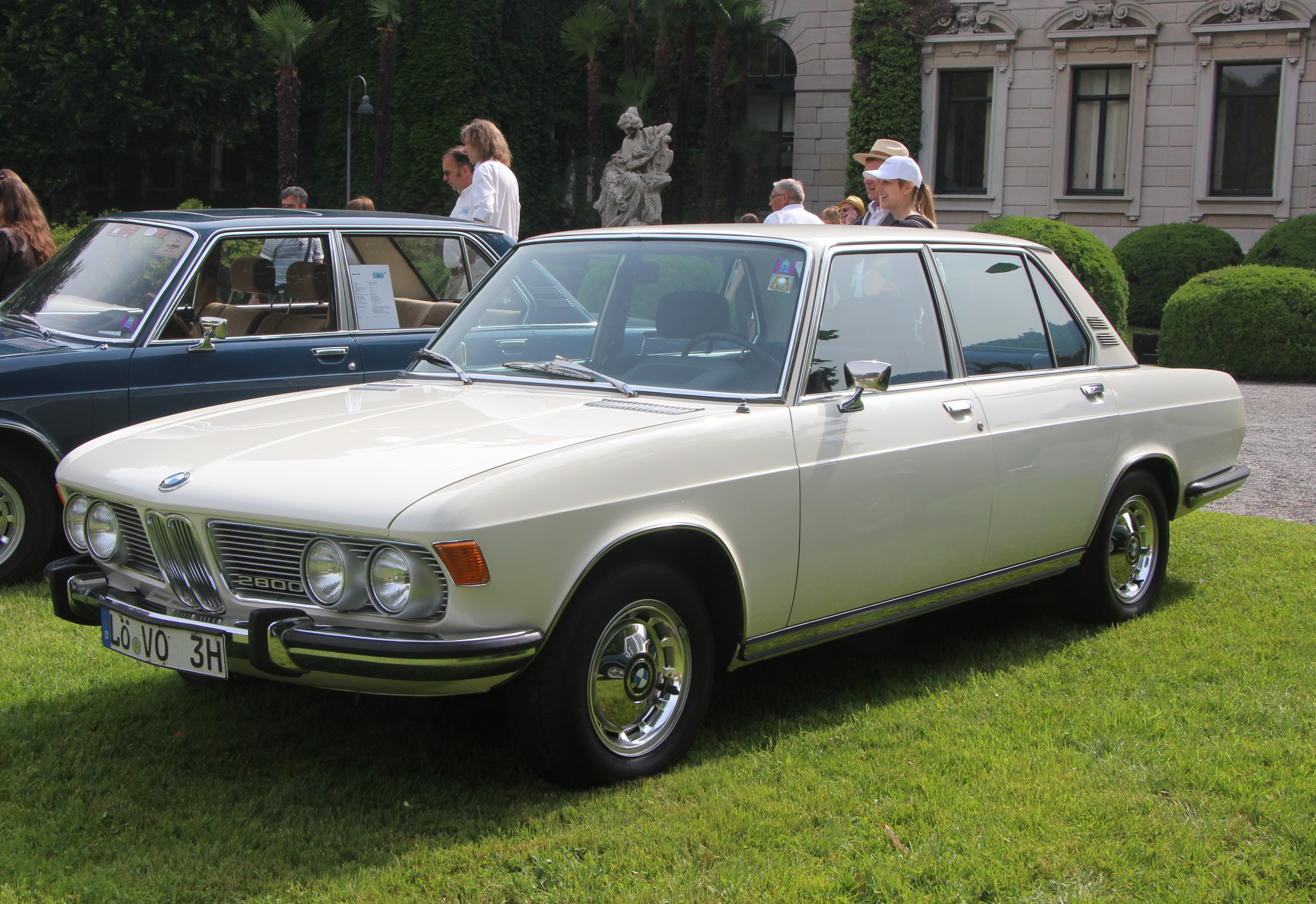
- BMW 2800

Overview
- Manufacturer: BMW
- Production: 1968–1977
- Assembly: Germany: Munich
- Designer: Wilhelm Hofmeister

Body and chassis
- Class: Executive car (E)
- Body style: 4-door sedan/saloon; 4-door extended wheelbase sedan/saloon
- Layout: Front-engine, rear-wheel drive
- Platform: E3
- Related: BMW E9 (coupés)

Powertrain
- Engine: 2.5 L M30B25 I6; 2.8 L M30B28 I6; 3.0 L M30B30 I6; 3.2 L M30B32LE I6; 3.3 L M30B33V I6
- Transmission: 4/5-speed manual; 3-speed automatic

Dimensions
- Wheelbase: 2,692 mm (106.0 in); 2,794 mm (110.0 in) (LWB)
- Length: 4,700 mm (185.0 in); 4,953 mm (195.0 in) (US); 4,801 mm (189.0 in) (LWB)
- Width: 1,750 mm (68.9 in)
- Height: 1,450 mm (57.1 in)
- Curb weight: 1,334 kg (2,941 lb); 1,470 kg (3,241 lb) (LWB)

Chronology
- Predecessor: BMW 501/502
- Successor: BMW 7 Series (E23)

The BMW E3 (also known as the New Six) is a line of mid-size luxury sedans produced by the German automaker BMW from 1968 to 1977. All models used the then-new M30 straight-6 engine. It marked BMW's return to the full-size luxury sedan market after a hiatus of fiveyears and was introduced as a response to growing market segment dominated by Mercedes-Benz. It was important in establishing BMW's reputation as a maker of sporting luxury sedans.

The related BMW New Six coupés (better known as the BMW E9) are built on a shortened version of the E3 platform. The E9 coupés share engines, transmissions, some suspension and many other features with the E3 sedans.

A total of 221,991 sedans and coupés were built.

== Development ==
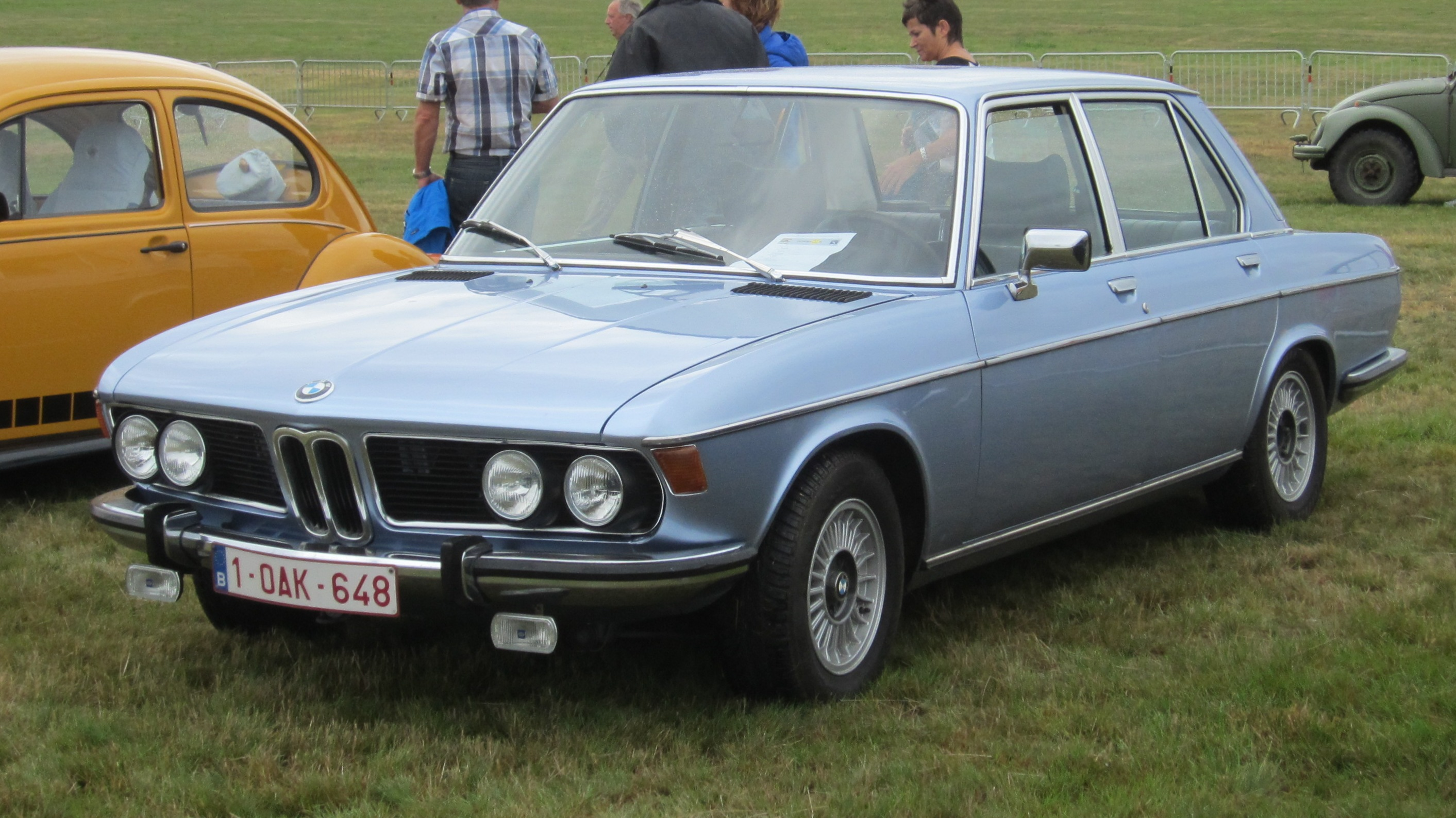
BMW 2800 (E3) "New Six" sedan/saloon

After a long hiatus, BMW decided to develop a six-cylinder car in the early 1960s. Work on what was to become the E3 commenced in 1965. The engine was based on the existing M10 inline-fours, sharing their overall layout, though not merely adding two cylinders. The design team was led by Wilhelm Hofmeister, with some detail work executed by Italy's Bertone and Michelotti studios. A goal was to offer more passenger space and comfort than the earlier, somewhat smaller New Class saloons had. The new sedan was noticeably a "driver's car", focusing on the front-seat occupants, and the smaller E9 coupé was more of a 2+2 than a full four-seater.

A new feature was the twin headlights, set into the grille, a design which was to define BMW styling for decades. Early mockups of the E3 featured broad rectangular single headlamps with rounded corners, but these never went into production - perhaps as a result of the lukewarm reception of the similarly designed 2000 CS. The new car also required a new welding plant at BMW's Munich site. In spite of the car's all-new construction it only cost 70 million D-mark to develop. This was less than half of what one might have expected at the time.

== Nomenclature ==
Models were given names denoting their engine sizes, and suffixes to indicate the long-wheelbase (L) and fuel injection (i) available on later cars. The coupés were all named CS, followed by i (for fuel injection models) or L (for light-weight models, which also had fuel injection and higher power).

- 2500/2.5, 2.5CS (2494 cc, 150 PS (110 kW; 148 hp))
- 2800/2.8, 2800CS (2788 cc, 170 PS (125 kW; 168 hp))
- 3.0S, 3.0L, 3.0CS (2985 cc, 180 PS (132 kW; 178 hp) using twin Zenith 35/40 INAT carburetors)
- 3.0Si, 3.0Li, 3.0CSi (2985 cc, 200 or 195 PS (147 or 143 kW; 197 or 192 hp), depending whether Bosch D-Jetronic or L-Jetronic was installed)
- 3.3L, 3.3Li (3295 cc, 190–197 PS (140–145 kW; 187–194 hp))
- 3.3Li (3210 cc, 197 PS (145 kW; 194 hp), 1976-1977)

== Models ==
The two initial models, introduced in 1968 and sold through 1977, were the 2.5 L 2500 and 2.8 L 2800. The airy, large greenhouse design was roomier than BMW's existing range and appeared rather large overall, in spite of being no more than 1 cm (0.4 in) longer than Mercedes' midrange sedans, which were generally considered to compete in a lower class than the new E3. They were large six-cylinder cars with fully independent suspension and four wheel disc brakes that handled well and impressed contemporary reviewers. Road & Track called the later Bavaria "delightful" and "superb", concluding that it was "one of the world's best buys". Aside from the larger engine, the 2800 also had bigger tyres and a somewhat sportier suspension, as well as various creature comforts such as a heated rear window, a full tool set, Boge Nivomat self-levelling rear suspension, and a smattering more external chrome.

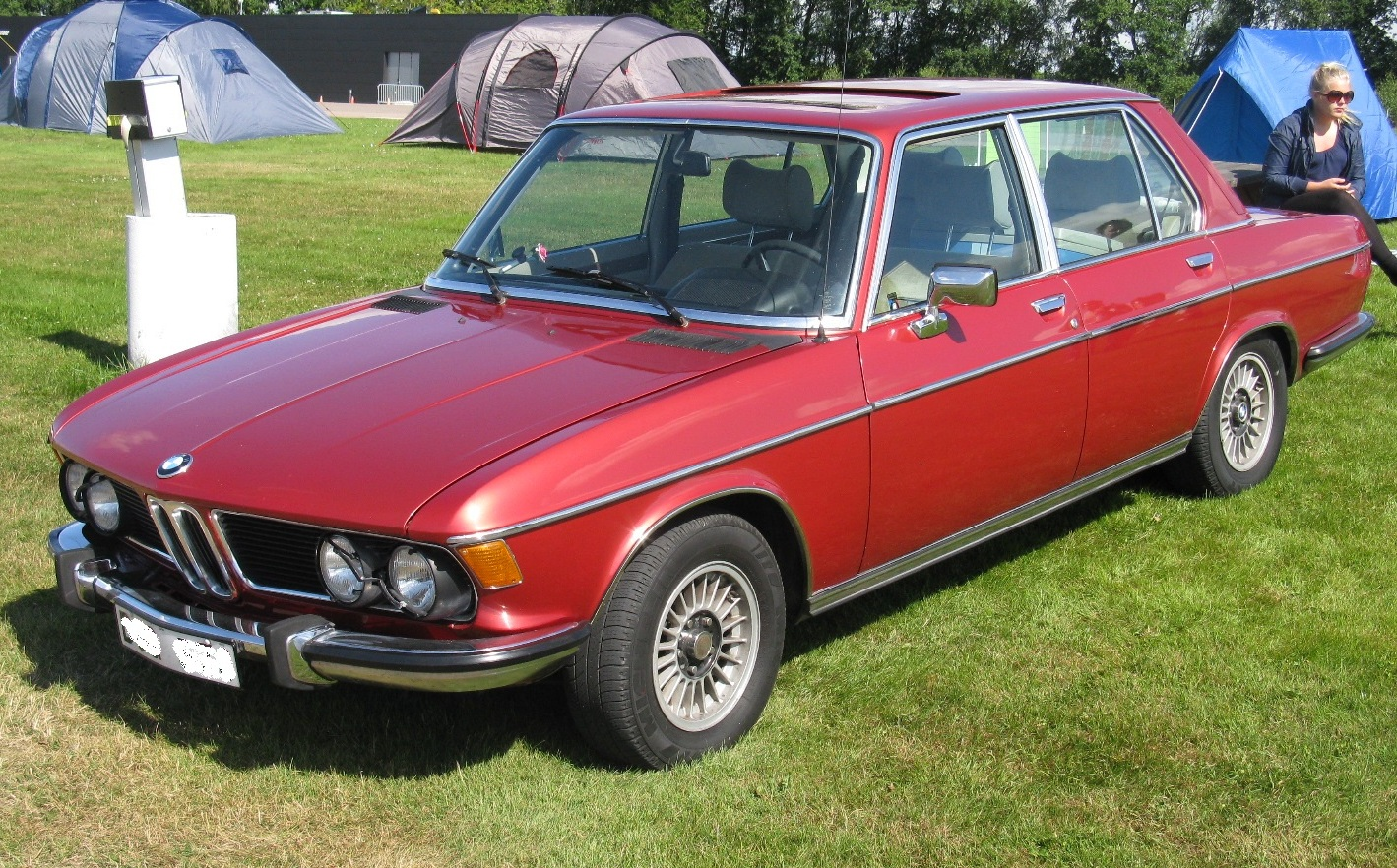
BMW 3.0 Si

The dual-carbureted 3-litre 3.0 S was introduced in 1971, being a more powerful and expensive model than the 2800; a fuel-injected version was also made. Also produced were long-wheelbase L models (3.0L, 3.3Li, etc.), whose sharp handling was a stark contrast to the large Mercedes-Benz models of the time. Langley Motors in Thames Ditton UK also produced an estate (tourer) version. Surprisingly, considering their respective marketing profiles, the 3.0 Si sedan was faster than the 3.0 coupé; which was a heavier car by 50 kg, with the same drivetrain.

In the UK, some 3-litre cars were used by the police in the 1970s, with the infamous ad "It takes one to catch one". Thames Valley Police bought a 3.0 Si in 1972, followed by Derbyshire Constabulary the same year and the West Mercia Police in 1974. The West Mercia Police's car was in an unusual livery called "truck yellow". Following the success of the 3.0 Si, many police forces in the UK began purchasing BMW cars, next one being the 5 Series (E12) in late 1970s.

The body was surprisingly light for its size, weighing less than the smaller E9 coupé. Vision is also good, with narrow pillars and no less than 2.5 m^{2} (27 sq ft) of overall glass area.

At the end of 1973 the new, larger 3.3 L was presented, going on sale in January 1974. It had the longer wheelbase and a bigger engine, although the power of the carburetted engine was no more than that of the 3.0 Si. Instead, more torque meant to provide a more luxurious rather than BMW's usual sporting feel. This engine was updated to fuel injection in June 1975, with a few more horsepower. Subsequent to the introduction of a 3.2-liter version of this engine in the 1976 BMW 633CSi, this slightly smaller model found its way into the 3.3 Li as well. The E3 Sedan was in production from 1968–1978, with a total of circa 190,000 cars produced. Of these, 71,804 were of the US-only "Bavaria" model.

=== North America ===
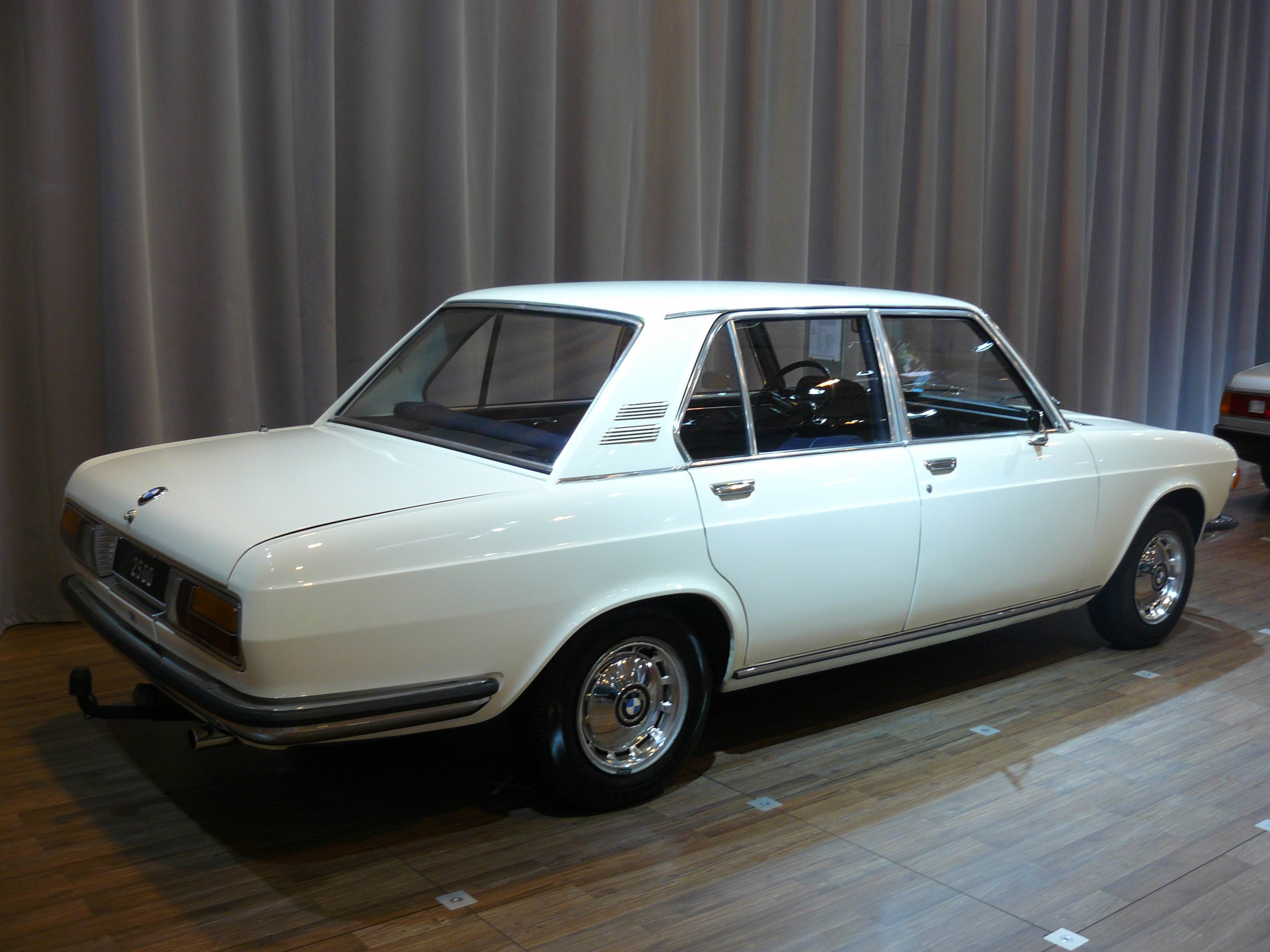
1969 BMW 2500 Rear view

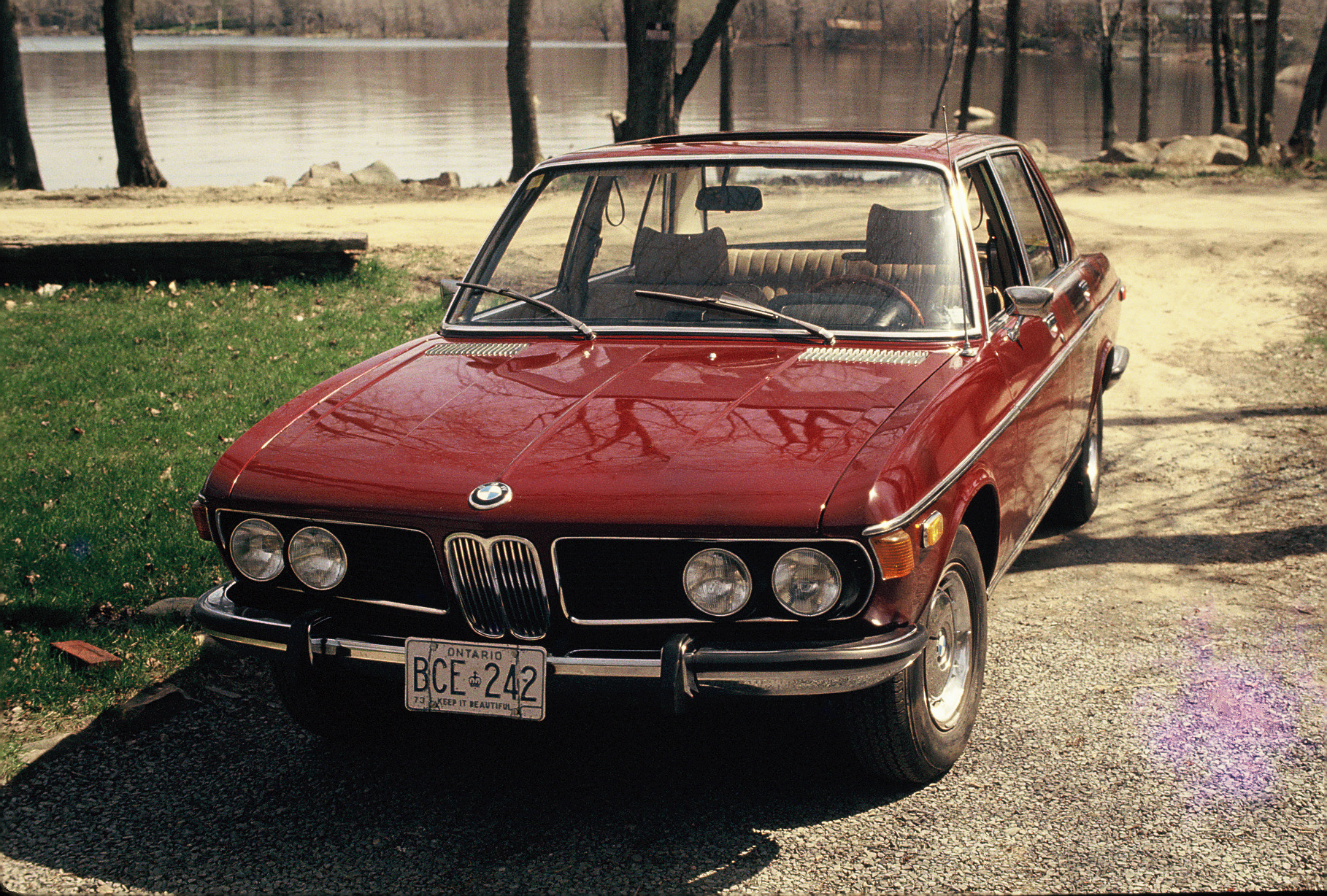
1973 Bavaria M30 engine

In the US market, the 2500 and 2800 were introduced in 1969. The 2500 was shy of many of the luxury features included in the 2800, and with the smaller engine, it sold for about $5,600 in 1970-equal to $46,000 today. The 2800 offered full leather interior, power windows, and power sunroof, which its price of $6,874 ($57,000 today) reflected. For the 1971 model year Max Hoffman, the BMW importer for the USA, convinced BMW AG to build the 2500 configuration car but use the 2800 engine — offering more power without the weight and expense of the 2800's luxury features. This new E3 configuration was called the "Bavaria" and was unique to the US market. Priced at about US$6,000 ($48,000 today), the Bavaria came to replace both older models. It is generally considered the forebear of the modern BMW high-performance large luxury sedan as it combined brisk acceleration, sporty handling, plenty of room for four people and a large trunk. An optional three-speed automatic transmission was offered.

For the 1972 model year, the 2500 was dropped while the M30 engine size in the Bavaria was increased to 3.0 liters. The former 2800 was then called the 3.0 S reflecting the 3.0 liter engine. These two models, the 3.0 S and the Bavaria, made up the North American E3 sedan line-up for 1972 through 1974. For the 1974 model year the E3 received the ungainly, federally mandated 5 mph (8 km/h) bumpers front and rear, significantly altering its profile.

In 1975 BMW introduced fuel injection to the US market M30 motor, replacing the twin two-barrel Zenith carburetors used since its inception. The Bavaria was dropped from the line-up, nominally replaced by the fuel-injected M30 powered E12 530i, and the fuel-injected 3.0 Si became the highest end of the BMW model range. The fully optioned 3.0 Si was sold during the 1975 and 1976 model years.

Bavaria Production:

model	Bavaria	3.0 S/Si
1968	2	
1969	13,211	
1970	13,210	
1971	4,817	8,414
1972	2,571	8,206
1973	2,371	8,286
1974	948	4,506
1975	14	2,548
1976		2,578
1977		122
totals	37,144	34,660

== Coupés (E9) ==
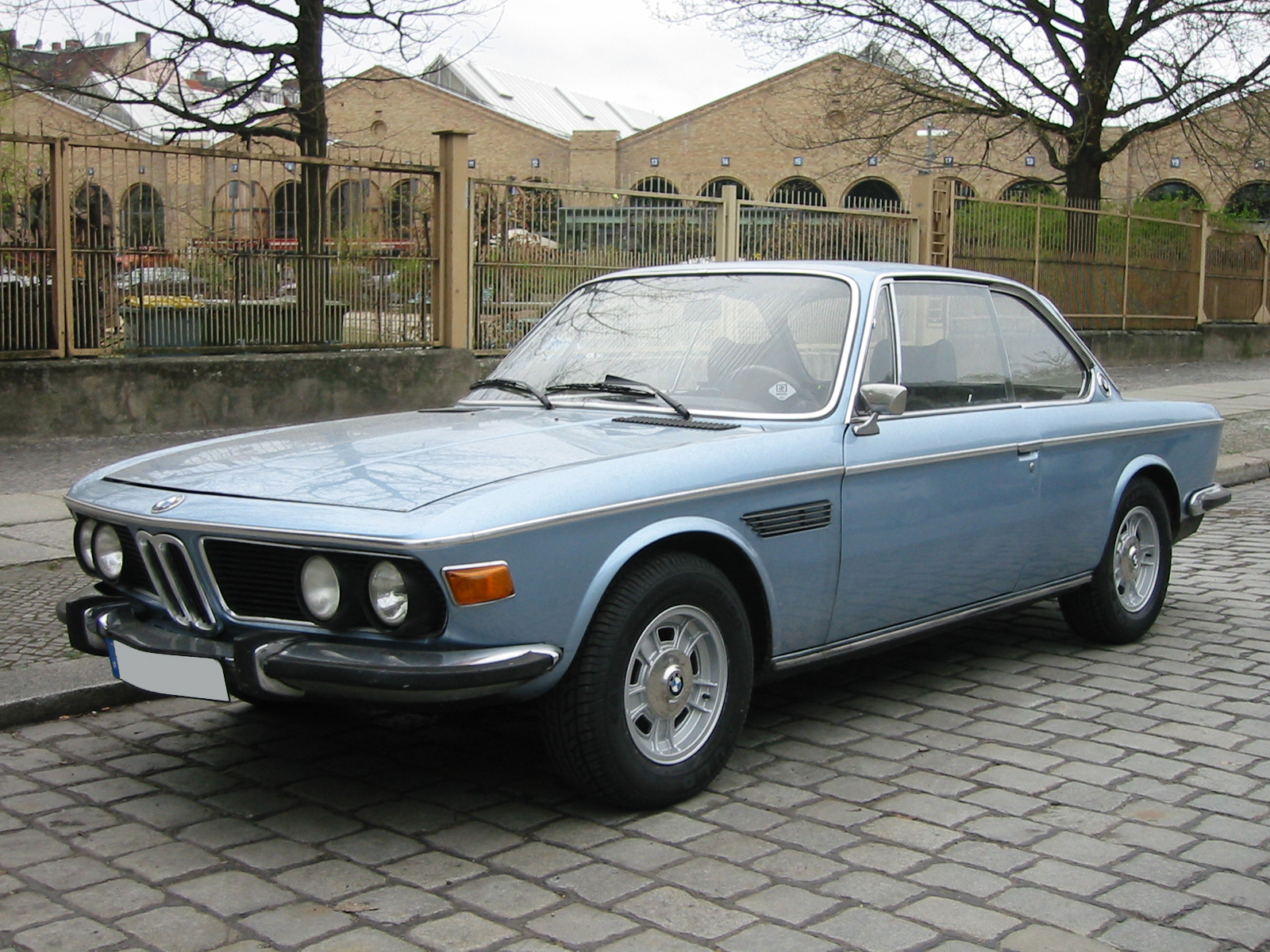
BMW 3.0 CS

The CS coupé models were based on the standard 2800 sedans, and looked very similar from the front. But they were also related to the earlier 2000CS, as is evident at the rear. The first model was the well-equipped 2800CS of 1968. The 3.0CS models introduced in 1971. In 1974 the smaller engined 2.5CS was made in small numbers, in response to the fuel crisis. The CSL models were lightweight racing versions.
