= BMW 5 Series (E34) =

Third generation of the BMW 5 Series

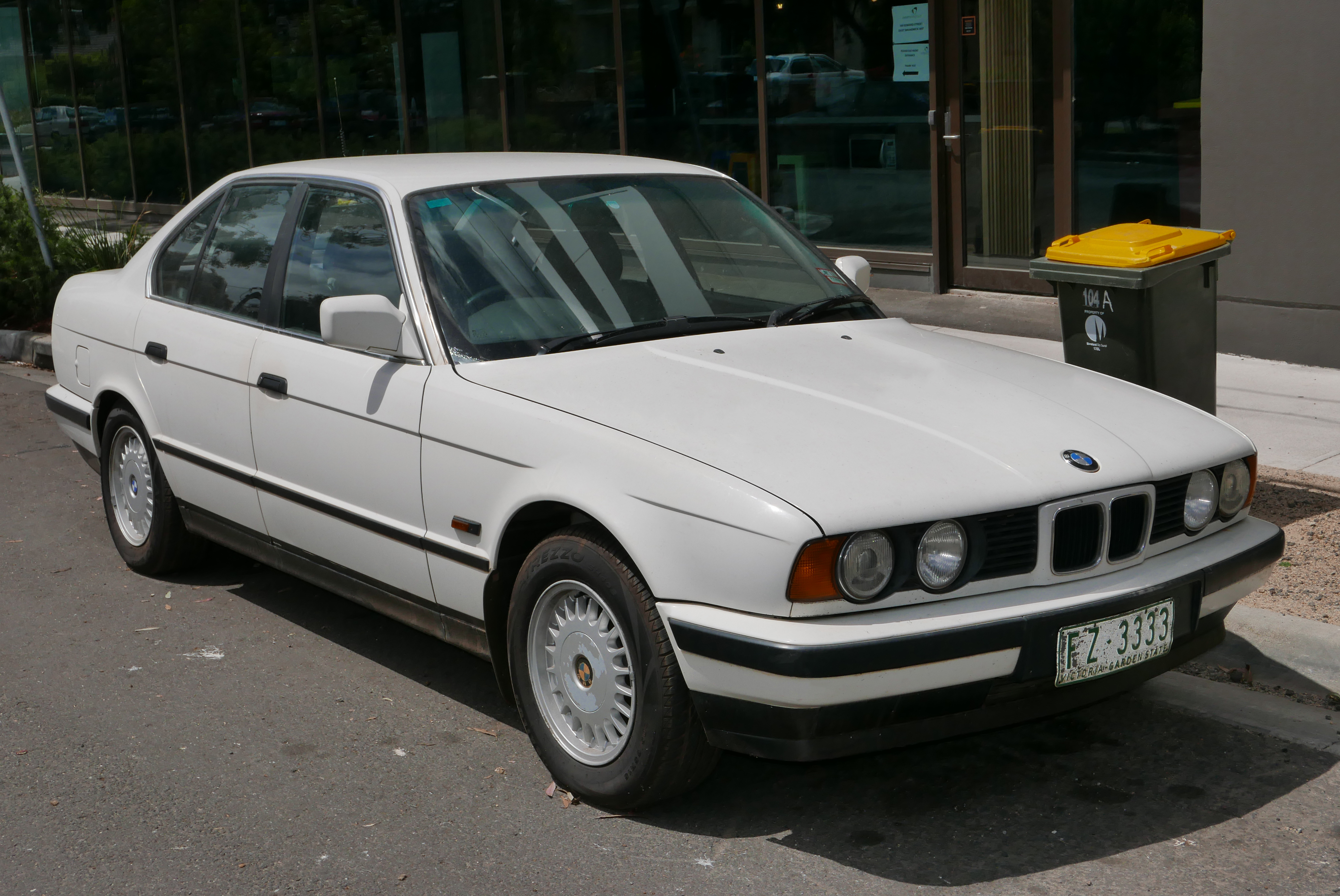

Overview
- Manufacturer: BMW
- Model code: E34
- Production: November 1987 – June 1996
- Model years: 1989–1996
- Assembly: Germany: Dingolfing; South Africa: Rosslyn (BMW SA); Thailand: Bangkok (Yontrakit Industry Co., Ltd.: 520iS)
- Designer: Ercole Spada and J Mays under Claus Luthe

Body and chassis
- Class: Executive car (E)
- Body style: 4-door saloon 5-door estate (Touring)
- Layout: FR layout; F4 layout (525iX only)
- Related: BMW M5 (E34)

Powertrain
- Engine: Petrol: 1.8 L M40/M43 I4; 2.0-3.8 L M20/M50/M30/S38 I6; 3.0-4.0 L M60 V8; Diesel (turbocharged): 2.4-2.5 L M21/M51 I6

Dimensions
- Wheelbase: 2,760 mm (108.7 in)
- Length: 4,720 mm (185.8 in)
- Width: 1,750 mm (68.9 in)
- Height: 1,412–1,420 mm (55.6–55.9 in)
- Curb weight: 1,440–1,800 kg (3,175–3,968 lb)

Chronology
- Predecessor: BMW 5 Series (E28)
- Successor: BMW 5 Series (E39)

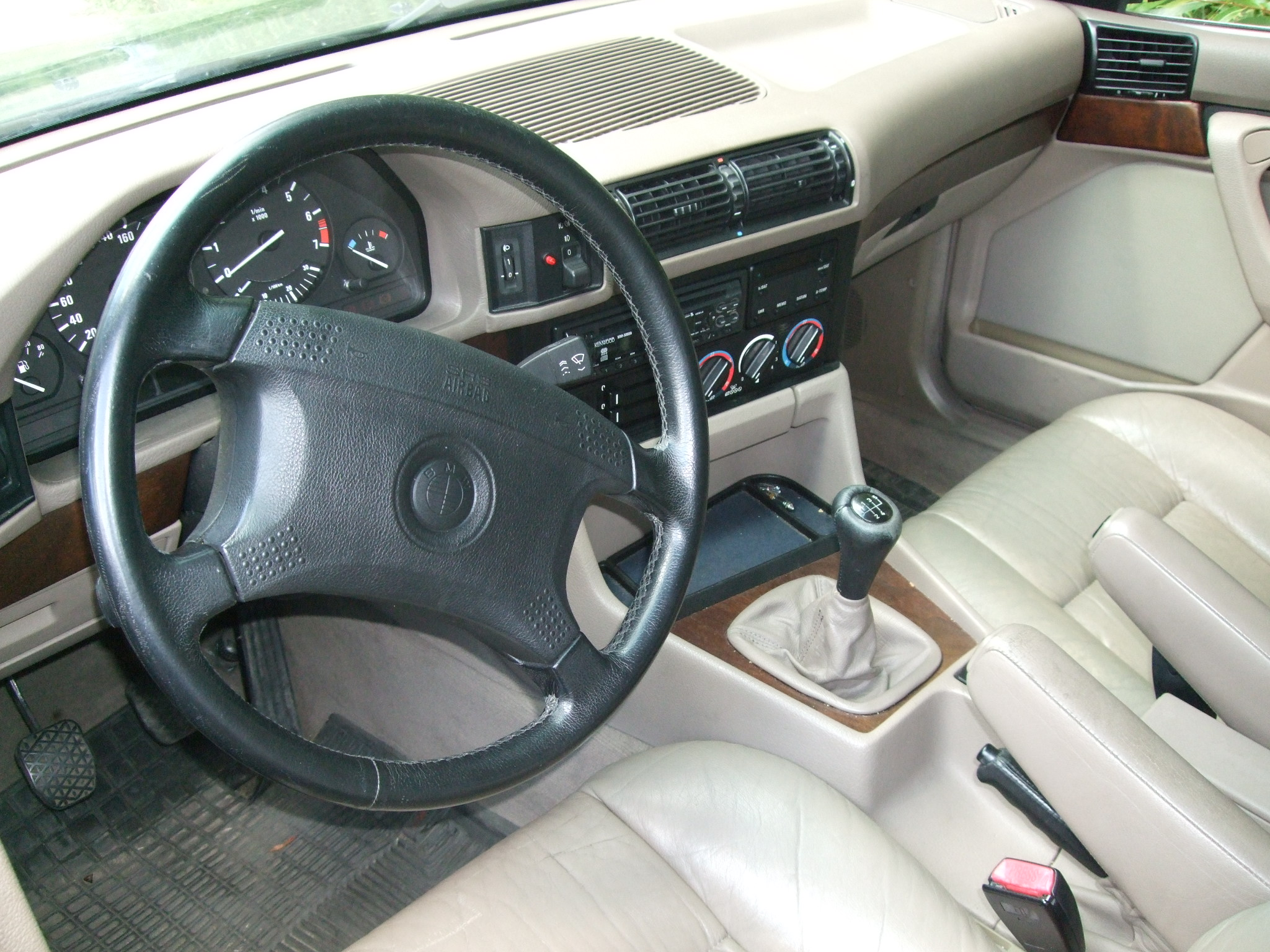
Interior

The BMW E34 is the third generation of the BMW 5 Series, which was produced from 2 November 1987, until 1996. Initially launched as a saloon in January 1988, the E34 also saw a "Touring" station wagon (estate) body style added in September 1992, a first for the 5 Series. BMW replaced the E34 with the E39 5 Series in December 1995, although E34 Touring models remained in production until June 1996.

The E34 generation marked the first time all-wheel drive was incorporated into the 5 Series with the 525iX, and the first V8 engine to be used in a 5 Series. The E34 also saw the introduction of stability control (ASC), traction control (ASC+T), a 6-speed manual transmission and adjustable damping (EDC) to the 5 Series range.

There was an unusually large range of engines fitted over its lifetime as nine different engine families were used. These consisted of straight-four, straight-six and V8 engines.

The E34 M5 is powered by the S38 straight-six engine and was produced in saloon and wagon body styles.

== Development and launch ==
Development ran from July 1981 to early 1987, with the initial design proposal penned by Ercole Spada in 1982. Under the guidance of chief designer Claus Luthe, BMW based much of the design on the E32 7 Series. Following Spada's departure from BMW and styling approval in 1983, J Mays finalized the design for production in mid-1985. Special attention was paid to aerodynamics, with the E34 basic saloon having a drag coefficient of 0.30.

Series production began in November 1987. In December 1987, the E34 saloon was unveiled to global press.

== Body styles ==
Saloon models have a length of 4,720 mm (185.8 in), a width of 1,750 mm (68.9 in) and a height of 1,412 mm (55.6 in). Wagon models have a length of 4,720 mm (185.8 in) and a height of 1,420 mm (55.9 in). All models have a wheelbase of 2,760 mm (108.7 in).

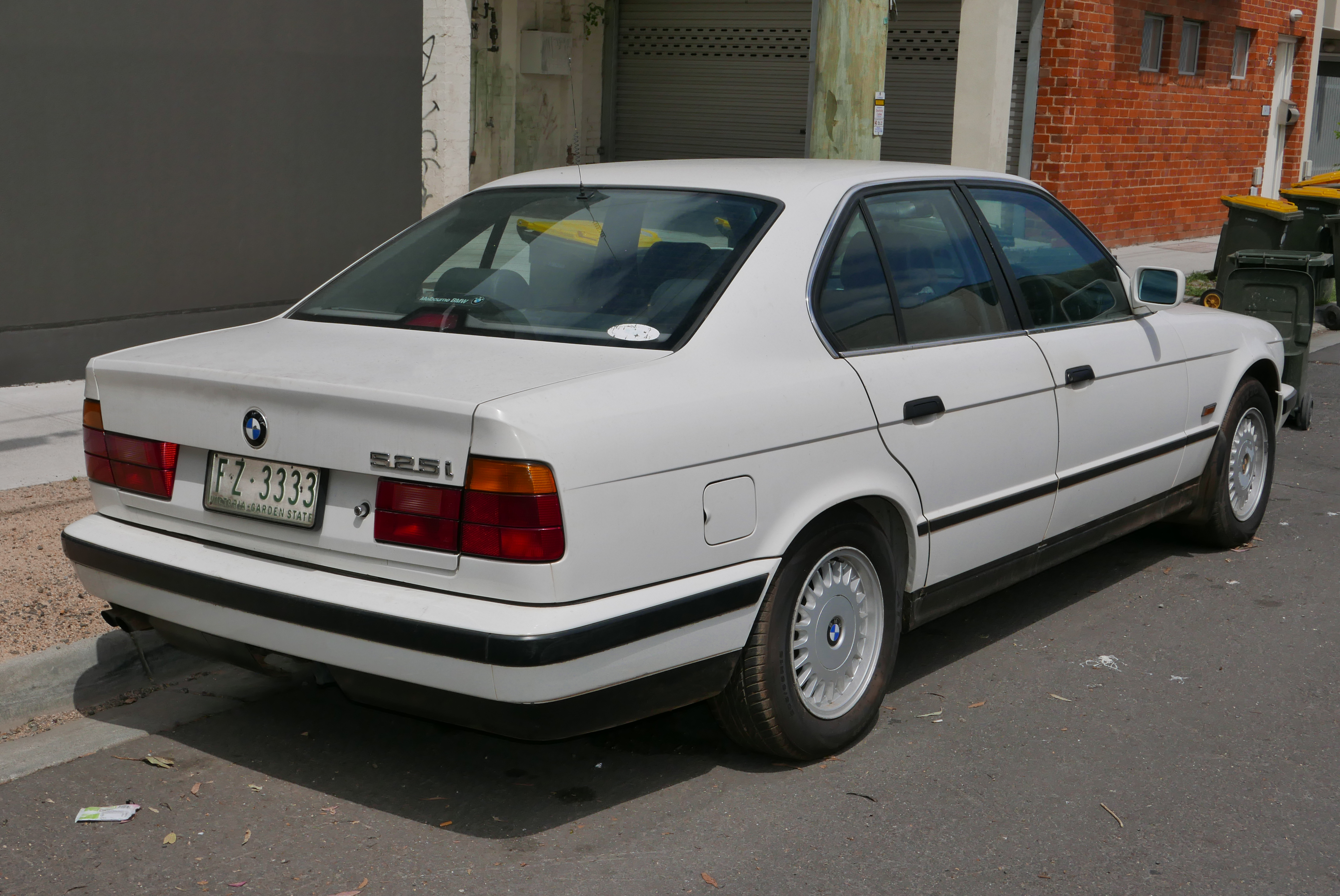
E34 saloon (pre-facelift)

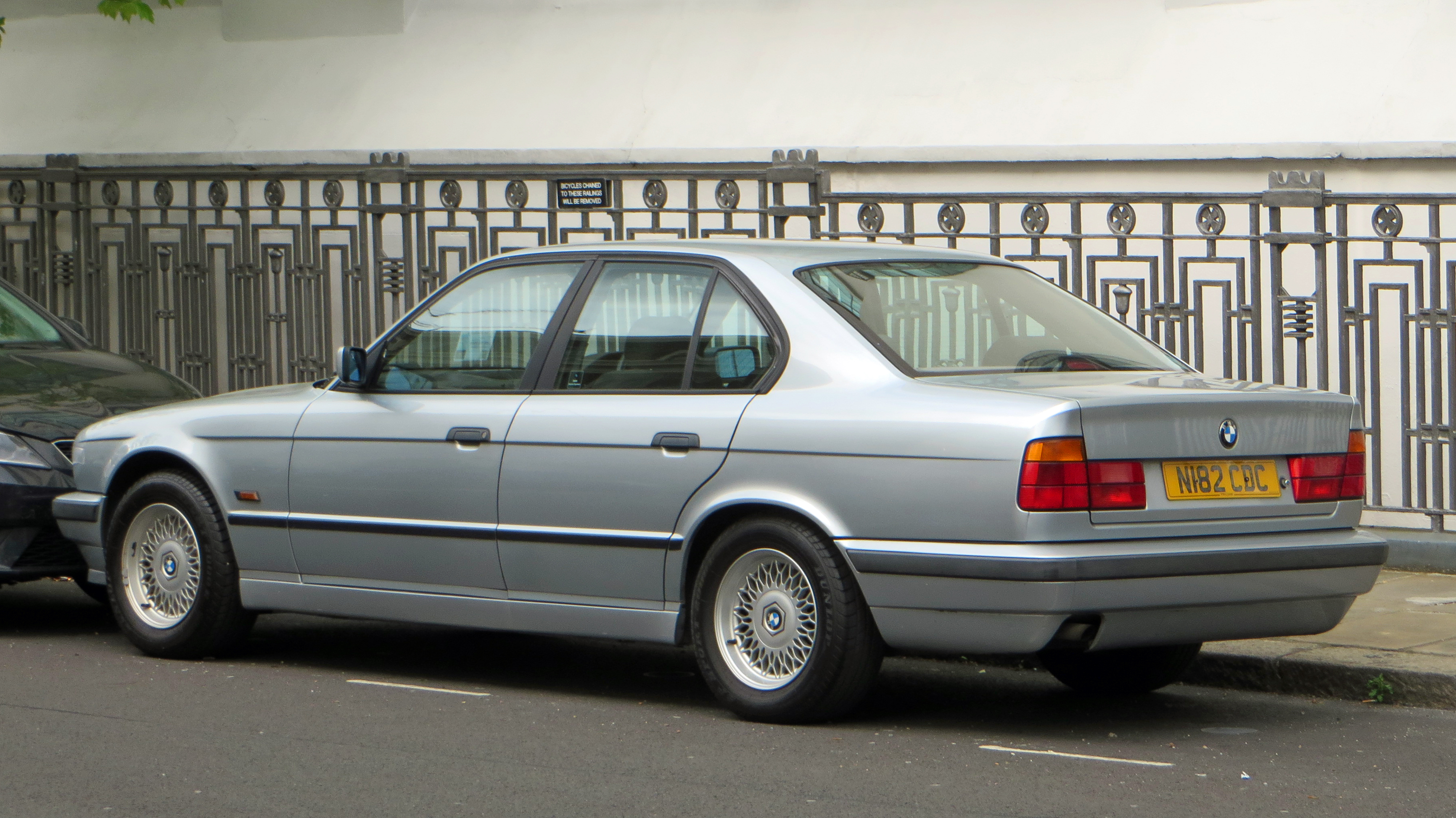
E34 saloon (facelift)

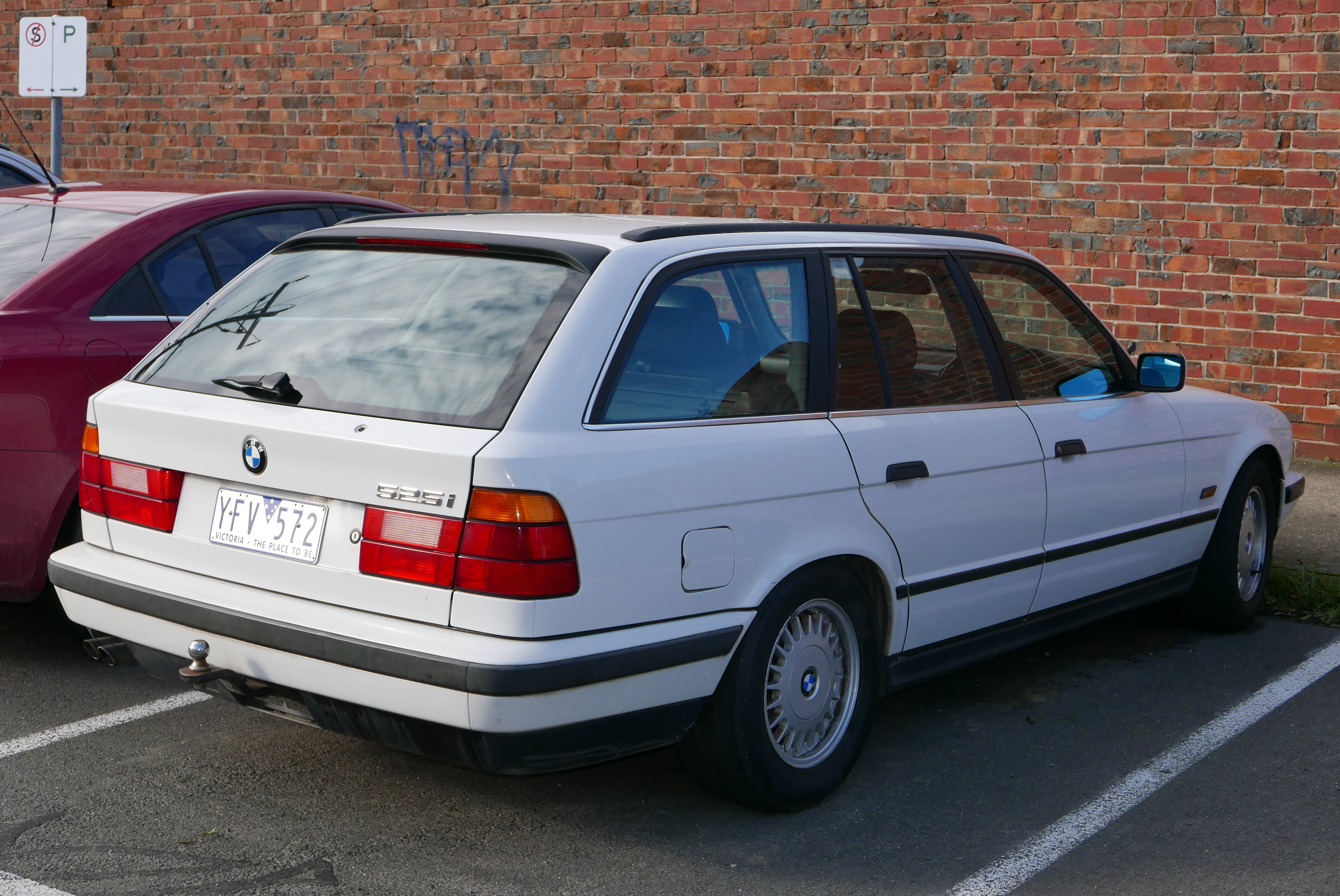
E34 Touring

== Engines ==
Official output figures are as follows:

=== Petrol ===
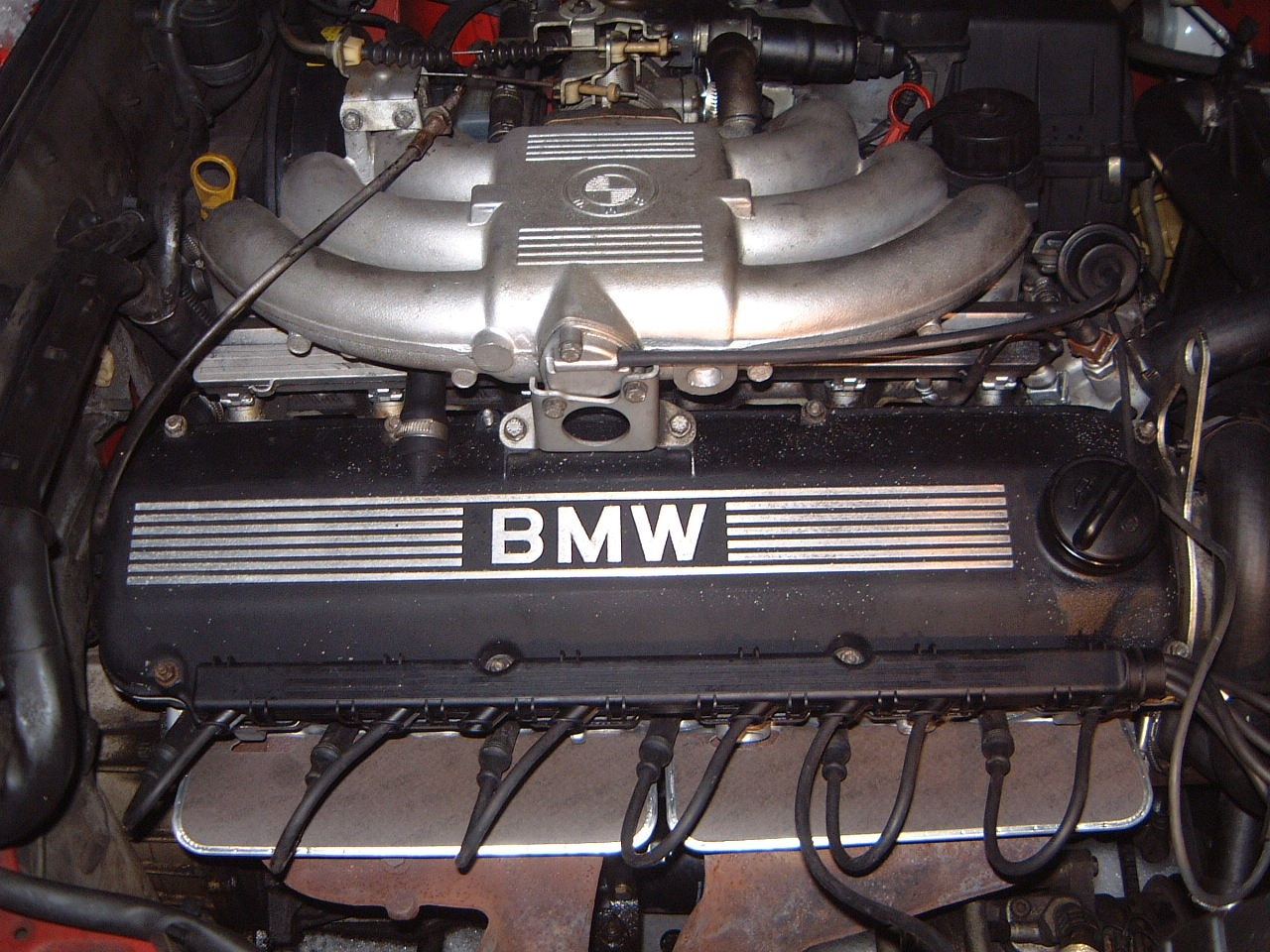
M20 engine- used in early 520i/525i models

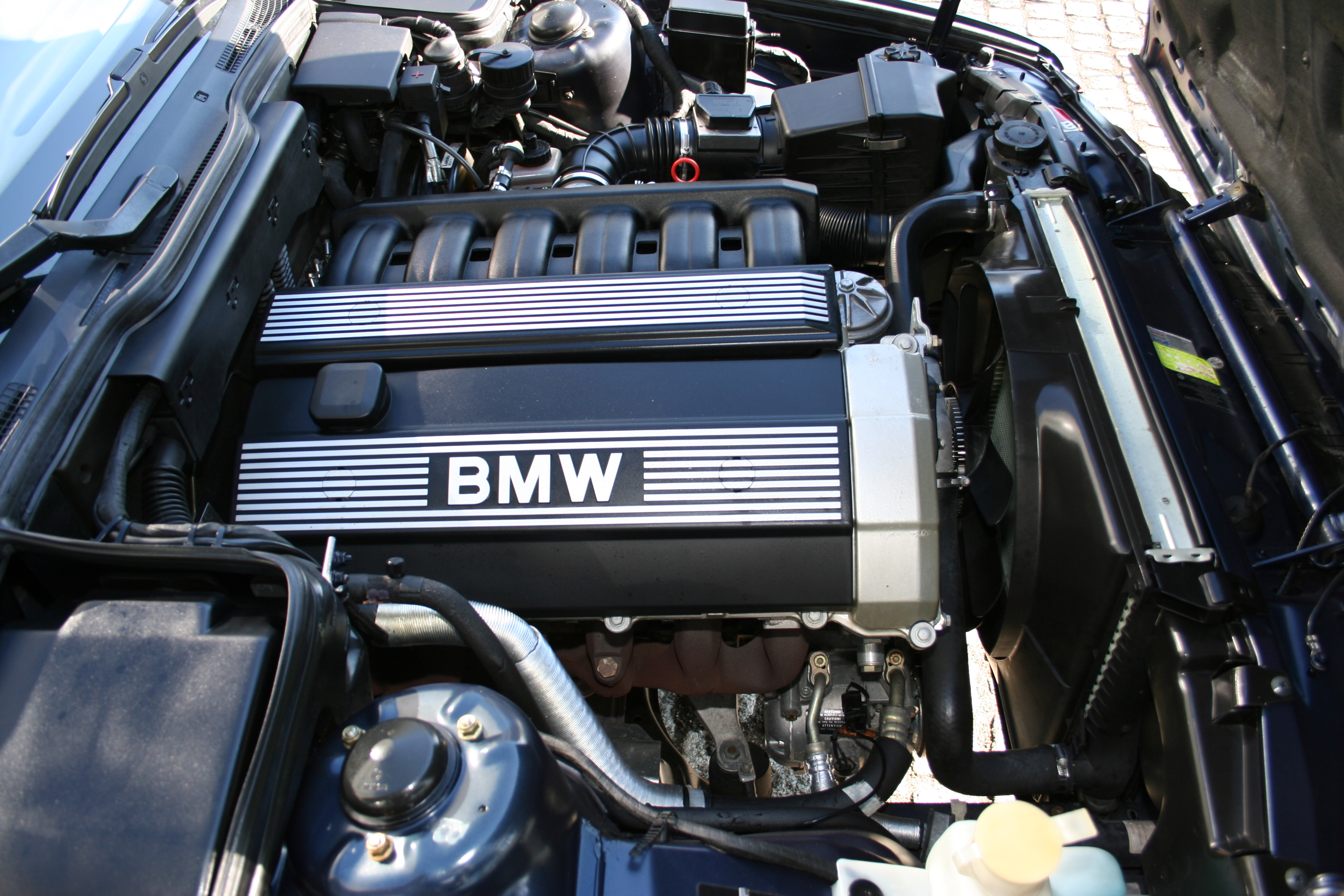
M50 engine- used in later 520i/525i models

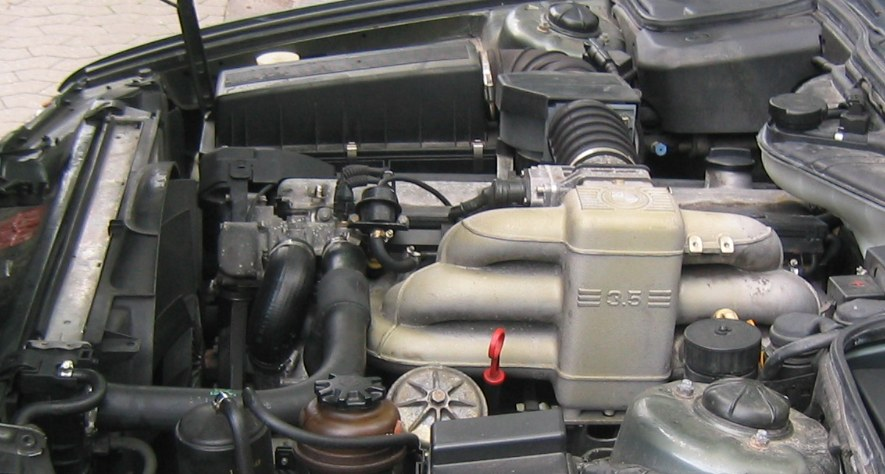
BMW M30 engine- used in the 535i/530i model

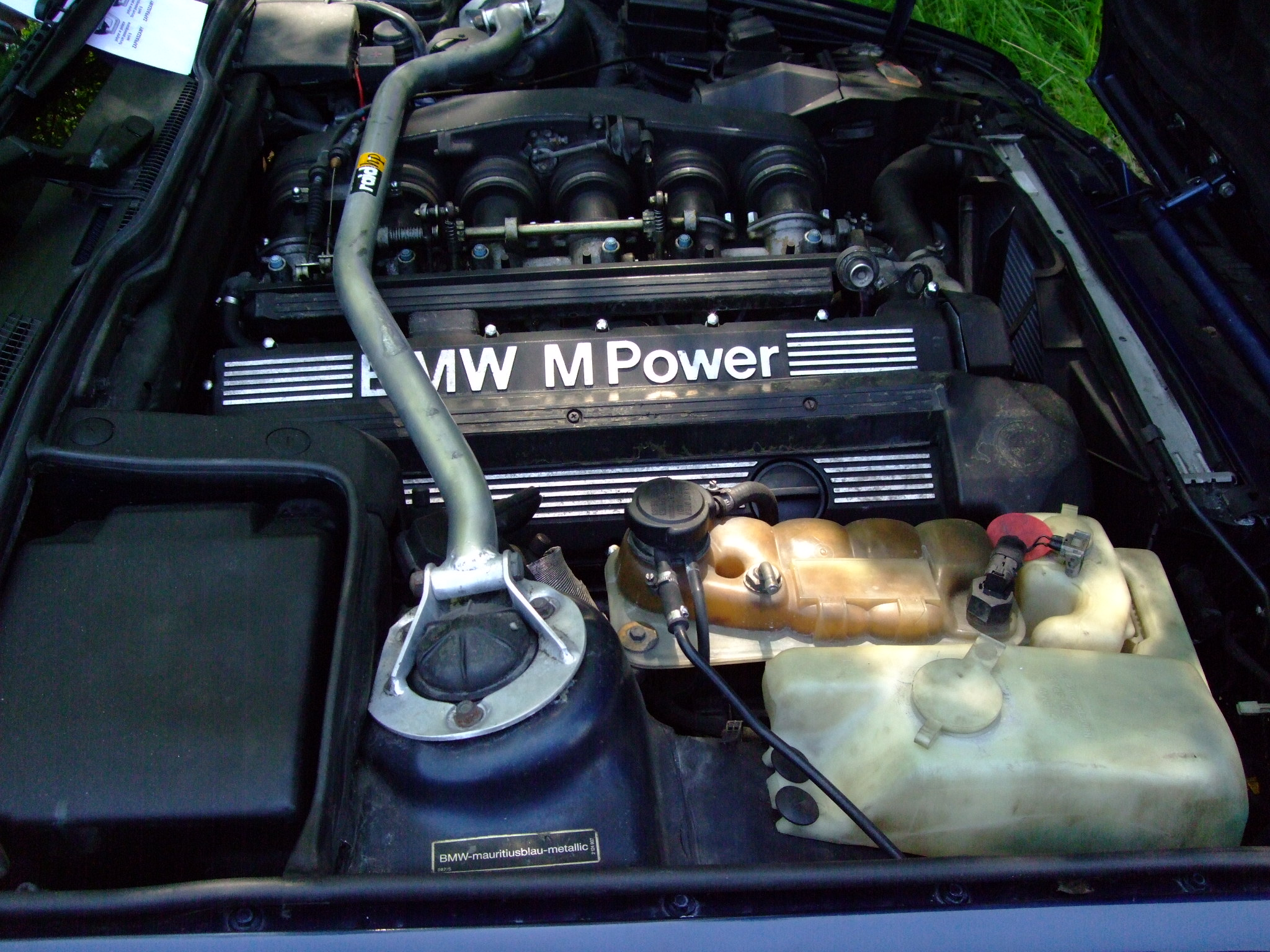
BMW S38 engine- used in the M5 model

Model	Years	Engine	Power	Torque
518i	1989–1994	M40B18 inline-4	83 kW (113 PS) at 5,500 rpm	165 N⋅m (122 lb⋅ft) at 4,250 rpm
518i	1994–1996	M43B18 inline-4	85 kW (115 PS) at 5,500 rpm	168 N⋅m (124 lb⋅ft) at 3,900 rpm
520i / 520iS	1988–1990	M20B20 inline-6	95 kW (129 PS) at 6,000 rpm	164 N⋅m (121 lb⋅ft) at 4,300 rpm
520i / 520iS	1989–1992	M50B20 inline-6	110 kW (150 PS) at 6,000 rpm	190 N⋅m (140 lb⋅ft) at 4,700 rpm
520i / 520iS	1992–1996	M50B20TÜ inline-6	110 kW (150 PS) at 5,900 rpm	190 N⋅m (140 lb⋅ft) at 4,200 rpm
525i	1988–1991	M20B25 inline-6	125 kW (170 PS) at 5,800 rpm	222 N⋅m (164 lb⋅ft) at 4,300 rpm
525i	1991–1992	M50B25 inline-6	141 kW (192 PS) at 6,000 rpm	245 N⋅m (181 lb⋅ft) at 4,700 rpm
525i	1992–1996	M50B25TÜ inline-6	141 kW (192 PS) at 5,900 rpm	250 N⋅m (184 lb⋅ft) at 4,200 rpm
530i	1988–1991	M30B30 inline-6	138 kW (188 PS) at 5,500 rpm	260 N⋅m (192 lb⋅ft) at 4,300 rpm
530i	1992–1996	M60B30; V8	160 kW (218 PS) at 5,800 rpm	290 N⋅m (214 lb⋅ft) at 4,500 rpm
535i / 535iS	1987–1992	M30B35 inline-6	155 kW (211 PS) at 5,700 rpm	305 N⋅m (225 lb⋅ft) at 4,000 rpm
540i	1992–1996	M60B40; V8	210 kW (286 PS) at 5,800 rpm	400 N⋅m (295 lb⋅ft) at 4,500 rpm
M5	1988–1992	S38B36 inline-6	232 kW (315 PS) at 6,900 rpm	360 N⋅m (266 lb⋅ft) at 4,750 rpm
M5	1992–1996	S38B38 inline-6	250 kW (340 PS) at 6,900 rpm	400 N⋅m (295 lb⋅ft) at 4,750 rpm

=== Diesel ===
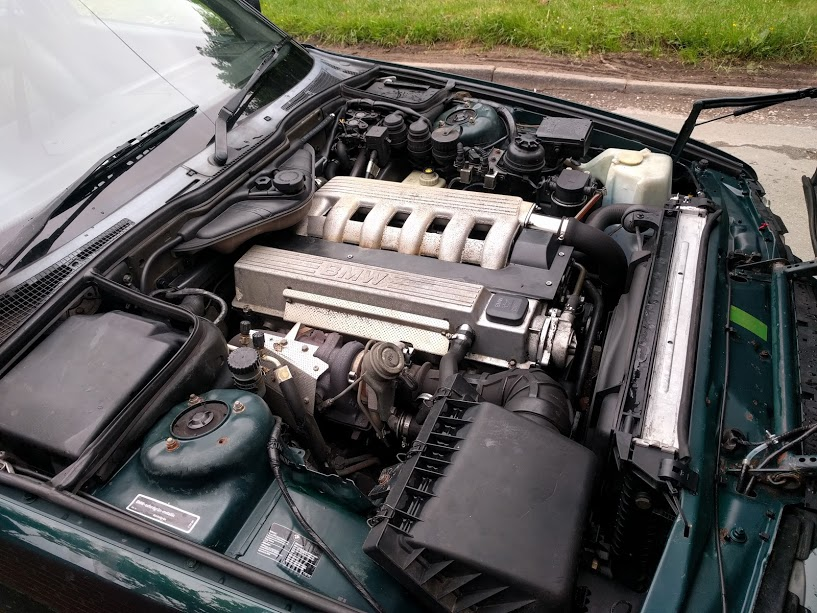
BMW M51 engine used in 525tds models (note the intake air hose coming from the intercooler which is located below the radiator)

Model	Years	Engine	Power	Torque
524td	1988–1991	M21D24 inline-6	85 kW (115 PS) at 4,800 rpm	220 N⋅m (162 lb⋅ft) at 2,400 rpm
525td	1993–1996	M51D25 inline-6	85 kW (115 PS) at 4,800 rpm	222 N⋅m (164 lb⋅ft) at 1,900 rpm
525tds	1991–1996	M51D25 inline-6	105 kW (143 PS) at 4,800 rpm	260 N⋅m (192 lb⋅ft) at 2,200 rpm

=== Performance ===
1994 Saloon Models	518i	520i	525i	525ix	530i	540i	525td	525tds
Top Speed (mph)	198 km/h (123 mph) *192 km/h (119 mph)	211 km/h (131 mph) *207 km/h (129 mph)	230 km/h (143 mph) *225 km/h (140 mph)	220 km/h (137 mph) *217 km/h (135 mph)	235 km/h (146 mph) *232 km/h (144 mph)	**250 km/h (155 mph)	194 km/h (121 mph) *190 km/h (118 mph)	207 km/h (129 mph) *205 km/h (127 mph)
0-50 km/h (31 mph)	4.0 seconds	3.4 seconds	2.6 seconds	3.0 seconds	2.7 seconds	2.3 seconds	4.2 seconds	3.6 seconds
0-80 km/h (50 mph)	8.4 seconds	6.7 seconds	5.8 seconds	6.4 seconds	5.6 seconds	4.7 seconds	8.8 seconds	7.5 seconds
0-100 km/h (62 mph)	12.3/ *13.7 seconds	10.6/ *11.7 seconds	8.6/ *9.5 seconds	9.5/ *10.3 seconds	7.7/ *8.8 seconds	6.4/ *6.8 seconds	12.9/ *13.9 seconds	11.0/ *11.6 seconds
0-120 km/h (75 mph)	17.2 seconds	14.2 seconds	11.8 seconds	13.0 seconds	11.0 seconds	9.0 seconds	18.2 seconds	15.0 seconds
Standing Kilometer	33.5/ *34.9 seconds	31.5/ *32.9 seconds	29.2/ *30.3 seconds	30.3/ *31.4 seconds	28.4/ *29.3 seconds	26.3/ *26.8 seconds	34.2/ *35.2 seconds	32.1/ *33.0 seconds

* Automatic Transmission

** Governed (Auto/Manual)

== Drivetrain ==
=== Manual transmissions ===
- 5-speed Getrag 260
- 5-speed Getrag 280 — 3.6 L M5 model only
- 5-speed ZF S5D 310 — 91-92 US, and European M50 engines
- 5-speed Getrag 250G - 93-95 US M50 engines.
- 6-speed Getrag 420G — 540i and 1994-1996 M5 only

=== Automatic transmissions ===
- 4-speed ZF 4HP22 - M20 and M30 engines
- 4-speed GM 4L30-E (A4S 310R) - M50 engines (US only)
- 5-speed ZF 5HP18 - M50 and M51 (except US) and 1992-1995 530i (M60B30).
- 5-speed ZF 5HP30 - 540i

== Suspension ==
Front suspension consists of double pivot MacPherson struts, with a replaceable shock absorber cartridge inside a steel strut housing. Control arms and thrust arms control front-to-back and side-to-side movement. Steering on most models is a recirculating ball design, however the all-wheel drive 525iX uses a rack and pinion steering system along with front suspension similar to the E30 3 Series 325iX model. All front suspension components are steel, except that the lower control arms on some models are aluminum.

Rear suspension consists of semi-trailing arms with coil springs integrated in a strut assembly.

== Models ==
=== Petrol-engined ===
The base model, available only in Europe, was the petrol-powered four-cylinder 518i. Only available with a 5-speed manual transmission, a total of 53,248 cars were produced.

The next petrol model up was the six-cylinder 520i, which began production in January 1988. It was initially powered by the BMW M20 single overhead camshaft engine, which was replaced by the BMW M50 double overhead camshaft engine in 1990. The 520i was the second most popular E34 model globally, with 426,971 units produced. The 525i was the most popular E34 model globally with 434,549 units produced. As per the 520i, the 525i initially used the M20 engine, which was replaced by the M50 engine in 1990.

Engine volume and year of manufacture often influenced the type of wiring. This was of great importance for decoding the configuration and the possibility of further retrofitting. Thus, cars can be divided into two types: high and low. Wiring had a big influence to the amount of possible options and functions of a car. There also was update after M50 and M60 introduce.

A rare E34 model is the petrol-powered six-cylinder 525iX, of which only 9,366 cars were produced. The 525iX was the first all-wheel drive 5 Series, and the only all-wheel drive model in the E34 range. It was powered by the BMW M50 engine and was the first 5 Series to use a rack and pinion steering system.

There are two versions of the E34 530i: an inline-six model produced from 1988 to 1990, and a V8 model produced from 1993 to 1995. The earlier model was one of the last applications of the BMW M30 inline-six engine. The V8 version, which replaced the six-cylinder 535i in the lineup, was powered by the new BMW M60 V8 engine and was available with a 5-speed manual or 5-speed automatic transmission. Initially, the V8 models were differentiated from other models by the wide grille; in 1994 the wide grille became available on other models. Between the two versions of the 530i, a total of 57,570 cars were produced.

The highest six-cylinder model (except for the M5) was the 535i. Despite the '535i' model designation and '3.5' casting on the intake manifold, the BMW M30 engine found in the E34 535i actually has a displacement of 3.4 litres (207 cu in). There was also a 535i Sport model with M-technic body kit, boot spoiler with brake light, sport seats, M-Tech sports leather steering wheel (M-tech 1 for 1988-1989 cars, M-tech 2 for 1990–1992), M-technic suspension (M-tech springs, stiffer shocks, M-tech 25mm front stabilizer bar, M-tech 18mm rear stabilizer bar), a polished rocker cover and also a limited-slip differential (25% lock) as standard. A total of 97,679 cars were produced, including the Alpina B10 (BiTurbo, 3.5) models. The 535i was replaced by the V8-engined 530i and 540i models in 1993.

In 1993, the 540i model was added to the top of the 5 Series lineup, powered by the BMW M60 V8 engine and available in both Saloon and wagon body styles (the latter not in US). Transmission options were a 6-speed manual or a 5-speed automatic. A total of 26,485 units were produced. Initially, the V8 models were differentiated from other models by the wider grilles. In 1994 the wide grilles became available on other models as well.

=== Diesel-engined ===
The first diesel model was the 524td, which was introduced in 1988. This model was replaced by the 525tds in 1991, and a lower-specification 525td was introduced in 1993. Only the 525tds model was fitted with an intercooler.

=== North America ===
In the United States, the E34 model range was launched in October 1988 with the 525i and 535i 6-cylinder models (for the 1989 model year). Over the course of the E34 generation, the 525i Touring, 530i, 530i Touring, 540i and M5 models were sold in the United States. The 3.6 L (220 cu in) version of the M5 remained in production until 1993, by which time the 3.8 L (232 cu in) version was being produced for other countries.

== M5 model ==
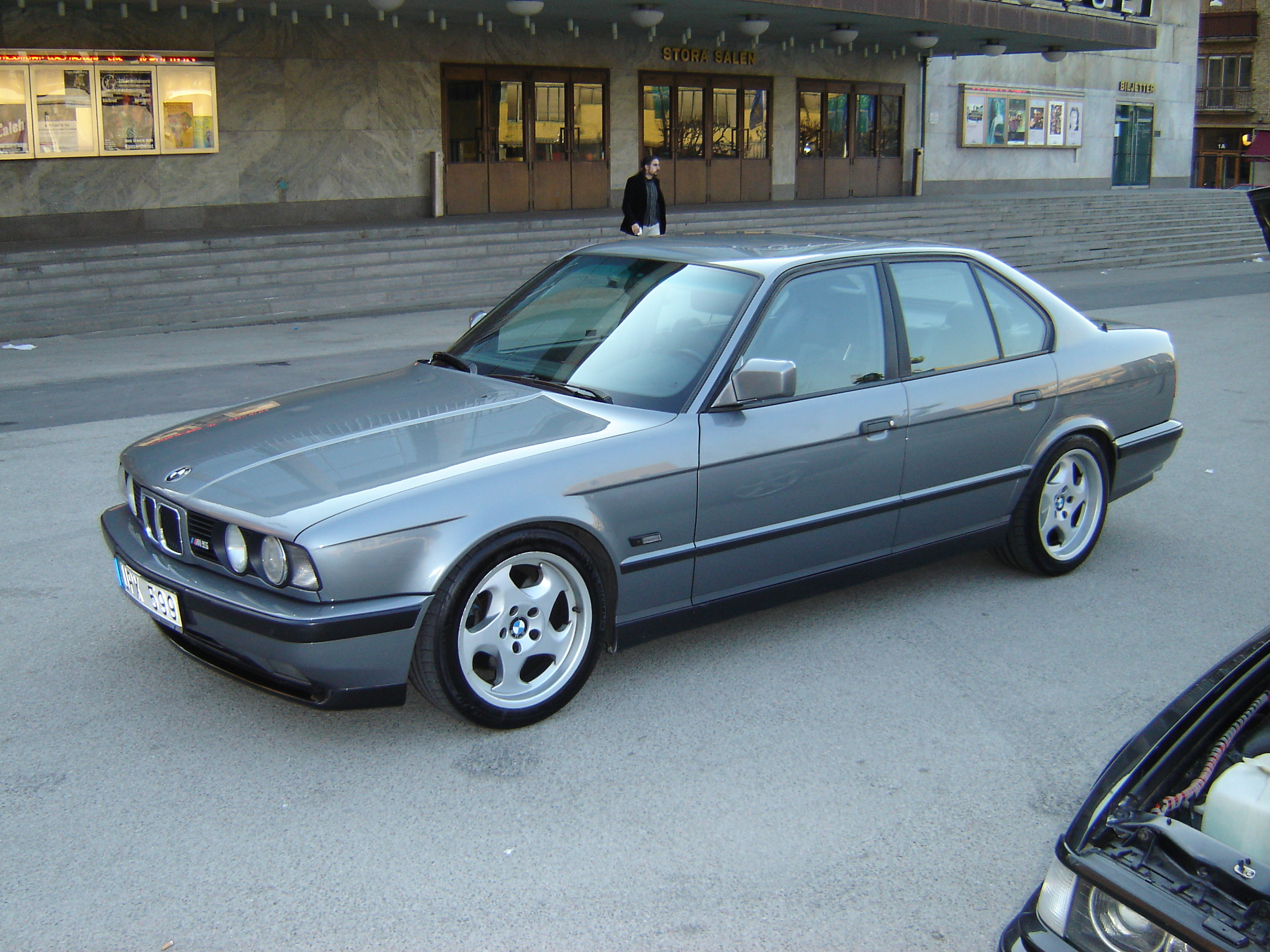
M5 model

Introduced in September 1988 and produced until August 1995, the E34 M5 was produced in both saloon and station wagon ('Touring') body styles, the latter being the first M5 to be available as a wagon.

The E34 M5 is powered by the BMW S38 inline-six engine, originally with a displacement of 3.6 L (220 cu in) and an output of 232 kW (311 hp), later upgraded to a 3.8 L (232 cu in) engine rated at 250 kW (335 hp). This 3.8 litre version of the M5 was first seen by the public at the 1991 Frankfurt Motor Show, where the E34 M5 Touring also saw its debut.

In its last year of production for the M5, the transmission was upgraded from a 5-speed manual to the Getrag 420G 6-speed manual (which was also used by the 540i model).

== Special models ==
=== 518g ===
A model which could run on natural gas (as well as petrol) and was only sold in Germany. The 518g was based on the 518i Touring model and the only transmission available was a 5-speed manual. The engine, also used by the 1995–2000 3 Series Compact 316g model, was a re-tuned version of the BMW M43 four-cylinder engine. When running on natural gas, the engine produced 73 kW (98 hp), compared with 84 kW (113 hp) when running on petrol. It was only produced in 1995 and just 298 units were built.

=== 518iev prototype ===
After unveiling the BMW E1 and E2 concept car electric vehicles in 1992, BMW began a project to show it was possible to make a full-sized electric car, despite the obstacle of the weight of the lead-acid battery technology at the time. The batteries were a lead-acid type and the electric motors used a rotating-field AC electric drive. To assist the electric drivetrain, the 518iev also had a four-cylinder petrol engine and a continuously variable transmission, a configuration similar to the first production hybrid cars produced by other manufacturers several years later. BMW built at least one fully functional E34 prototype, which was tested in the late 1990s by Deutsche Post and others.

=== 540i M-sport / M540i / 540i LE ===
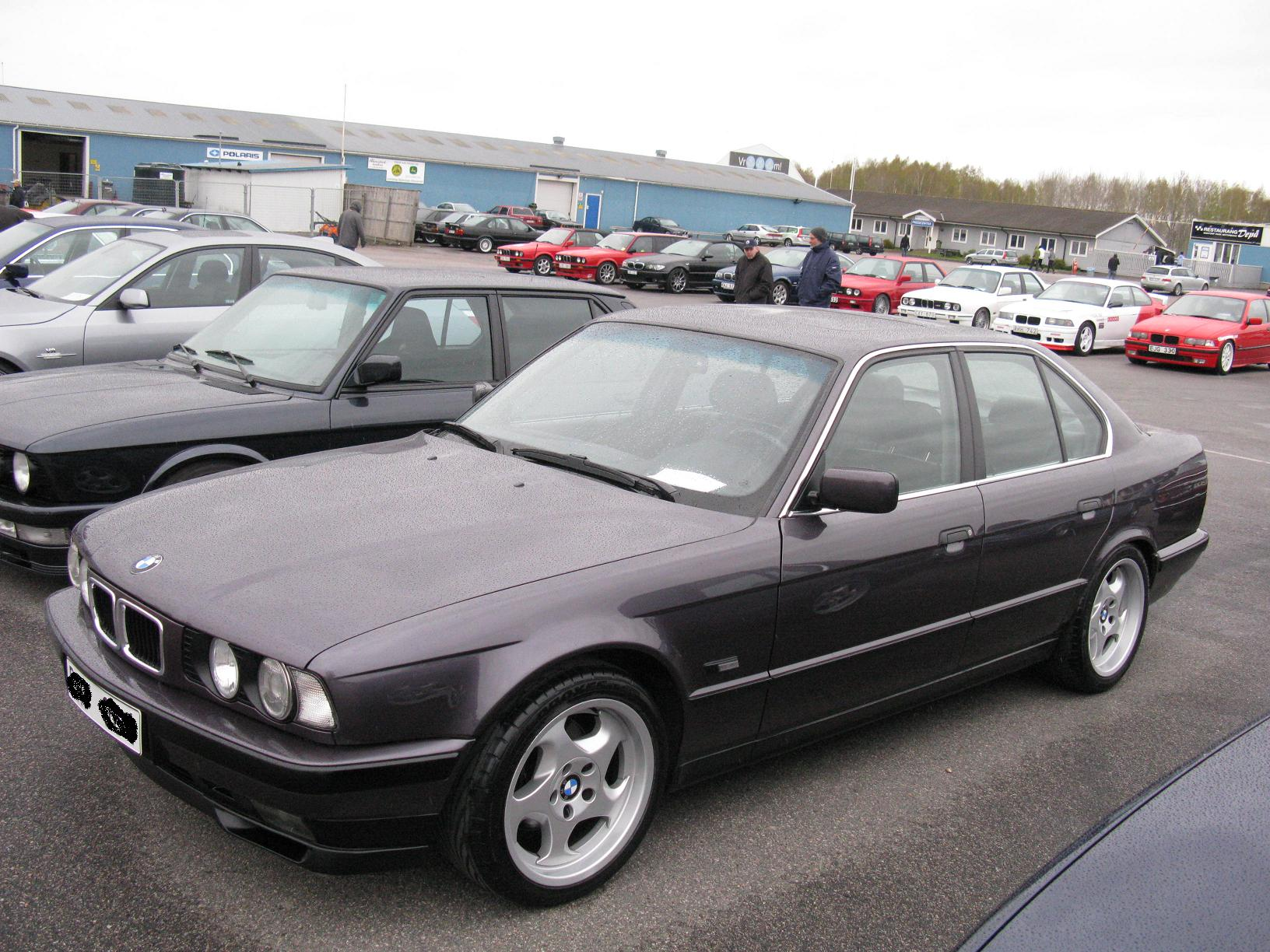
540i model with "throwing star" wheels

Because the M5 was discontinued for non-European markets in 1993, the 540i M-Sport model was built in 1995 for the North American market. On top of the regular 540i features, additional features included sports suspension equipped with EDC, bolstered sport seats, servotronic steering, and US-spec M5 brakes. 205 "M-Sport" models were built, 139 of them with the 6-speed manual transmission.

An M540i model was produced for in Canada. It includes the features of the North American 540i M-sport, plus upgraded Euro-spec M5 brakes, 18-inch M-parallel wheels, and various trim pieces. Only 32 of these cars were built, all with a manual transmission.

The 540i LE (i.e. Limited Edition) saloon was sold in Australia (not to be confused with the E34 M5 Limited Edition sold in the UK). The 540i LE included the interior from the M5, "throwing star" M-System II wheels, EDC suspension with self leveling rear, Servotronic power steering, and front air dam. 70 of these 540i LE saloons were produced, all with a manual transmission, each individually numbered using an engraved metal plaque stuck onto the centre console beneath the handbrake lever.

== Alpina models ==
=== B10 3.0 AllRad ===
This model is based on the 525iX with an enlarged 3 litre engine producing 231bhp instead of 192bhp and 230ftlb upfrom 184ftlb. Between 1993 and 1996 64 saloon cars and 70 Touring cars were produced by the Alpina factory in Buchloe with a very small number of right hand drive cars, 2 saloons and 1 Touring, converted by Sytner, the Alpina Dealer in Nottingham, England.

=== B10 3.5 ===
This model is based on the 535i with a modified 3.5 litre engine producing 254bhp instead of 220bhp, and 240ftlb up from 225. Between 1988 and 1992 572 left hand drive cars were made in Buchloe, with perhaps 30 or so right hand converted by Sytner. The B10 3.5 was only supplied as a saloon car and no Touring cars were made.

=== B10 4.0 ===
This model is based on the 540i with a modified 4 litre engine producing 315bhp instead of 286bhp and 302ftlb up from 295. Between 1993 and 1995 45 saloon cars and 4 Touring cars were produced by Buchloe, all left hand drive, with a further two right hand drive saloon cars converted by Sytner.

=== B10 4.6 ===
This model is based on the 540i with an Alpina designed 4.6 litre engine which was used also in the E36 Alpina B8 4.6. Between 1994 and 1996 27 saloon cars and 19 Touring cars were produced by Buchloe, all left hand drive except one right hand drive Touring car. With 7bhp more than the B8 4.6 (due to the larger exhaust manifold) it produces the same 340bhp as the E34 3.8 M5 Touring but with nearly 20% more torque at 354lbft over the 295 of the M5 . It was also available in right hand drive unlike the M5 Touring.

=== B10 BiTurbo ===
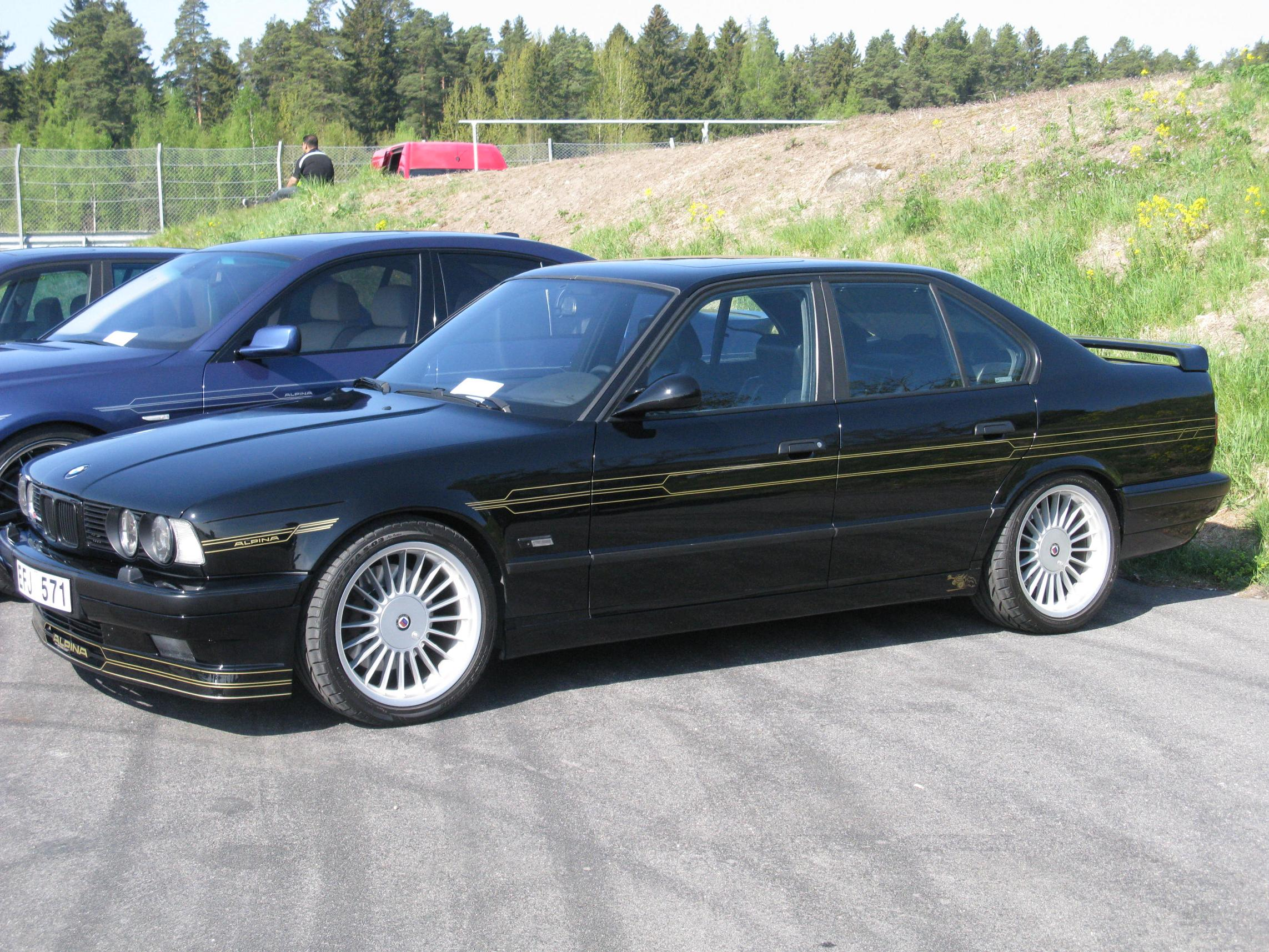
B10 Biturbo model with Alpina wheels

The B10 BiTurbo was based on a highly modified 535i and introduced in March 1989 after a $3.2million investment in R&D. Despite being nearly twice the price of a BMW M5 it sold well and production ceased in 1995 after 507 saloon models were made, and only after BMW ceased producing the M30 engine upon which the engine was based. It was not available in right hand drive due to the turbochargers placement or as a touring model. It produced 360bhp and 375lb/ft of torque on full boost, just 20bhp and 21lb/ft more than the B10 4.6. Along with the Lotus Carlton it was considered one of the fastest saloon cars in the world.

== Model year changes ==
BMW E34 had no facelift as such. All updates were introduced gradually and sometimes were country specific. Most changes occur in September each year, when the changes for the following model year go into production, as is typical BMW practice. Therefore, the changes for 1988 represent the 1989 model year, for example.

=== 1988 ===
- M5 model introduced
- 524td diesel model introduced
- 518i four-cylinder model introduced
- Driver's side airbag introduced

=== 1989 ===
- 520i engine updated to the BMW M50, the first model to use the new twin-cam straight-six engine

=== 1990 ===
- 525i engine updated to the BMW M50 in some markets, 1991 in others.
- 525iX all-wheel drive model introduced
- 525tds diesel model introduced

=== 1991 ===
- 525i engine updated to the BMW M50 in the US market.
- Touring (station wagon/estate models) introduced: 520iT and 525iT.
- Leather seat stitching pattern changed from double to single.
- Steering columns and wheels changed from E30-compatible (22mm nut) to E36-compatible (16mm bolt).
- New interior (wooden decor)

=== 1992 ===
- 520i and 525i engines updated to the BMW M50TU, which added variable valve timing (VANOS)
- V8 engines introduced in the 530i and 540i models. The V8 models adopted a wider grille than other models.
- M5 engine enlarged from 3.6 litres to 3.8 litres
- Revised exterior mirrors and hubcaps
- Revised interior electrics, primarily with central locking. General Modules were black on early cars, green on later, and not interchangeable.
- 525i manual transmission changed from ZF 310Z to Getrag 250G, US market only.

=== 1993 ===
- 525td diesel model introduced
- Last year for 535i six-cylinder model, marking the end of the 24-year production run of the M30 engine
- 6-speed manual transmission available for 540i model (the first 6-speed manual available in a 5 Series), non-US markets.
- ASC became available
- New side mirror design

=== 1994 ===
- 518i engine upgraded from BMW M40 to BMW M43
- M5 transmission upgraded from 5-speed manual to 6-speed manual
- Wider grille (previously used for V8 models only) became available for other models, non-US markets.
- US-market Touring models no longer equipped with self-leveling suspension as standard.
- EWS 1 drive-away protection used in some models.

=== 1995 ===
- All models equipped with wider grille and body-colour lower body trim (US market).
- Interior materials revised: steering wheel slightly different design with colour emblem, door cards ruched/gathered leather and with different glue (more durable between panel and its vinyl/leather covering, less durable between panel and mounting clips).
- EWS drive-away protection updated to EWS 2.
- 540i available with 6-speed manual transmission for the US market, all with Sport seats and suspension.
- 540i automatic and manual models equipped with 2.93 final drive, previously 2.81 (US market, at least).

== Production ==
Production of the E34 commenced on November 2, 1987, for the 535i, with 535i market launch being in January 1988 and other variants following a staggered launch. 520i and 530i production began in January 1988, for March 1988 market launch. Production of the 525i began in February 1988, being launched to market in April 1988, with the 524td entering production in March 1988 for May 1988 introduction. Touring production began in November 1990. Production ended for the saloon in December 1995 and Touring in June 1996.

The production plants for the E34 were the Dingolfing plant in Germany and Rosslyn in South Africa. Total production was 1,333,412 units.
