= BMW 3 Series Compact =

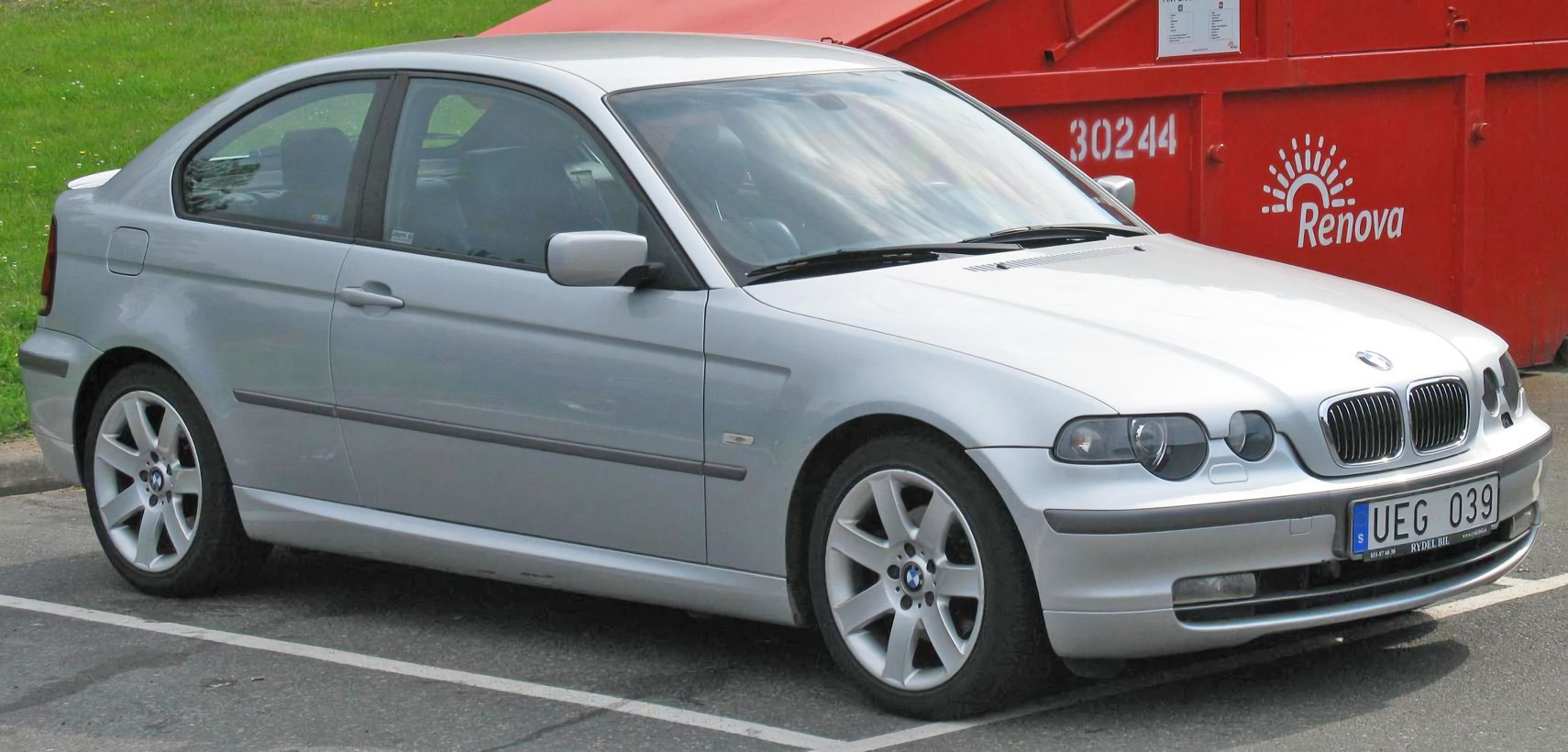

Overview
- Manufacturer: BMW
- Production: 1994–2004

Body and chassis
- Class: compact executive car (C)
- Body style: 3-door hatchback
- Layout: Front-engine, rear-wheel-drive

Chronology
- Successor: BMW 1 Series (E87)

The BMW 3 Series Compact is a car which was produced from 1994 through 2004 by BMW. It is a 3-door hatchback version of the BMW 3 Series through two generations, for the E36 platform in 1993 and E46 platform in 2001. Unlike most hatchback competitors, which were transverse engine front-wheel drive, the 3 Series Compact uses the longitudinal engine rear-wheel drive layout.

In 2004, the 3 Series Compact was replaced by the 1 Series which encompassed 3-door and 5-door hatchback, coupé and convertible body styles (the coupé and convertible models have been marketed separately as the 2 Series since 2014) as BMW's entry-level cars; a new nameplate was created since the 1 Series is smaller than the contemporary 3 Series despite sharing mechanical components. The 3 Series GT, introduced in 2013, is not a successor to the 3 Series Compact, despite also using a hatchback rear opening.

== First generation (E36/5; 1994) ==
BMW 3 Series Compact
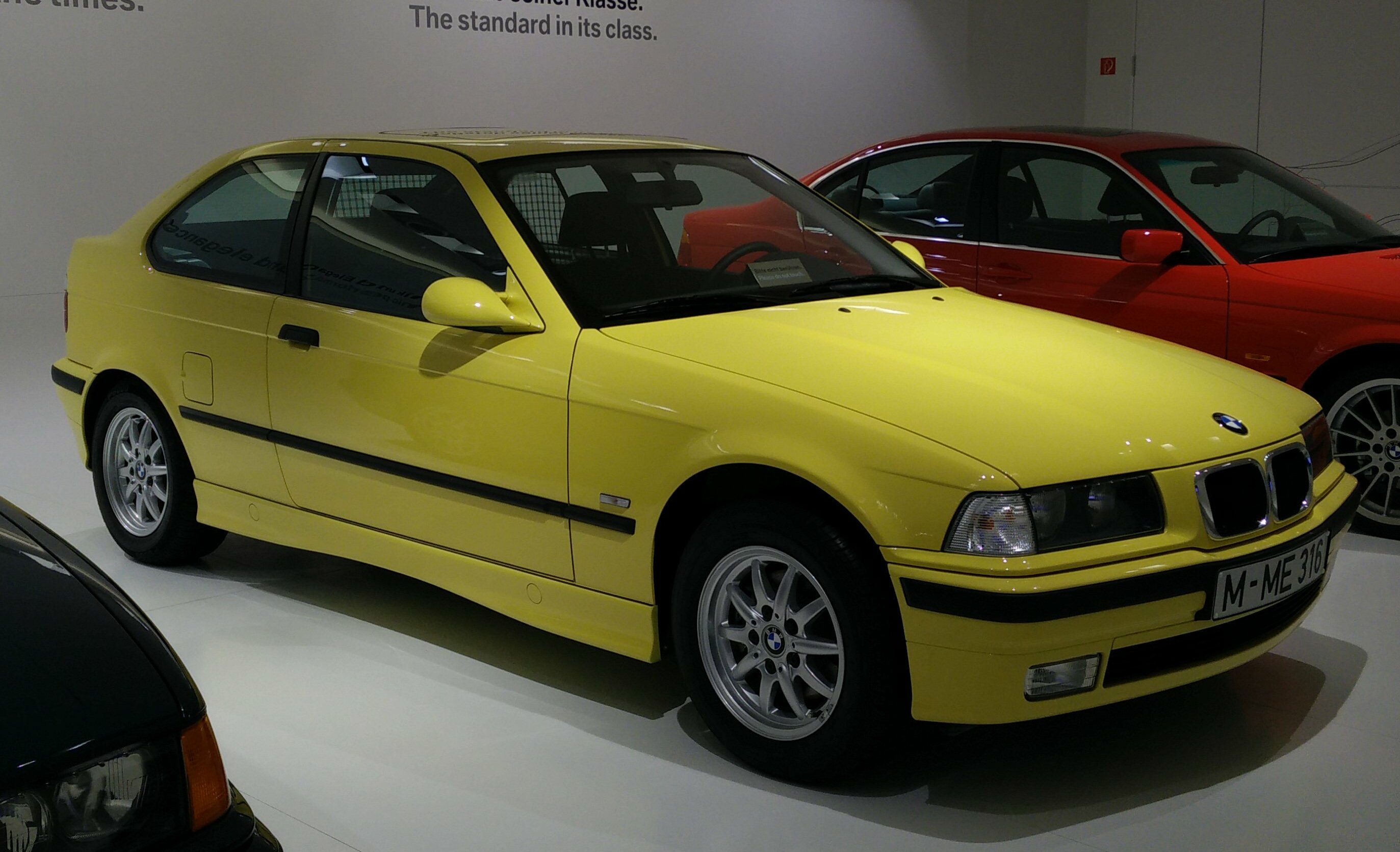

Overview
- Production: 1994–2000

Body and chassis
- Platform: BMW 3 Series (E36)

Powertrain
- Engine: Petrol: 1.6–1.9 L M43 I4; 1.8 L M42 I4; 1.9 L M44 I4; 2.5 L M52 I6; Diesel: 1.7 L M41 turbo I4; CNG: 1.6 L M43 I4

Dimensions
- Wheelbase: 2,700 mm (106.3 in)
- Length: 4,210 mm (165.7 in)
- Width: 1,698 mm (66.9 in)
- Height: 1,393 mm (54.8 in)
- Curb weight: 1,175 kg (2,590 lb)−1,290 kg (2,844 lb)

Launched in March 1994, the E36 3 Series Compact (model code E36/5), was BMW's first hatchback since the 2002 Touring model was discontinued in 1974. It reportedly cost BMW 500 million USD to develop the hatchback from the E36 platform.

From the front bumper to the A-pillar, the E36/5 is identical to the E36 saloon. From the A-pillar back, the E36/5 is unique. Although the overall length of the E36/5 is approximately 200 millimetres (7.9 in) shorter than the rest of the E36 3 Series range, the length of the wheelbase is the same. The doors with framed windows are unique to the E36/5, rather than adopting the E36 saloon/wagon's or the E36 coupé's frameless doors.

The interior is mostly similar to the E36 saloon models, apart from the folding rear seats and dashboard which share some elements with the previous generation E30 3 Series. Some cost-cutting was employed in the E36/5 dashboard such as manual air conditioning, compared to the rest of the E36 lineup which had automatic climate control.

The E36/5 front suspension uses the E36's MacPherson strut design, while the rear suspension uses a semi-trailing arm from the previous generation E30 models instead of the Z-Axle multi-link suspension used by the rest of the E36 range. The E36/5's rear suspension arrangement - which was also used on the Z3 - was more compact and cheaper to produce. Some reviewers believed that this arrangement caused the E36/5's to be prone to oversteer.

The launch models were powered by four-cylinder petrol engines, with the range expanded over the years to include a four-cylinder compressed natural gas engine, four-cylinder diesel engines, and six-cylinder petrol engines. In North America, the sole model available was the 318ti, initially powered by a DOHC 1.8 litre, 138 hp (103 kW; 140 PS) inline-four BMW M42 engine. In 1996, in conjunction with making the car compliant with OBD-II, the M42 was replaced by the 1.9-litre M44 engine.

A large sunroof, covered by a folding canvas roof was available from mid-1995. This model was known as either the California Top Edition or the Open Air Edition.

In September 1996 (for model year 1997), the 3 Series Compact received a facelift in line with the remainder of the E36 range. Changes included revised tail-lights, grille, bumpers and mirrors.

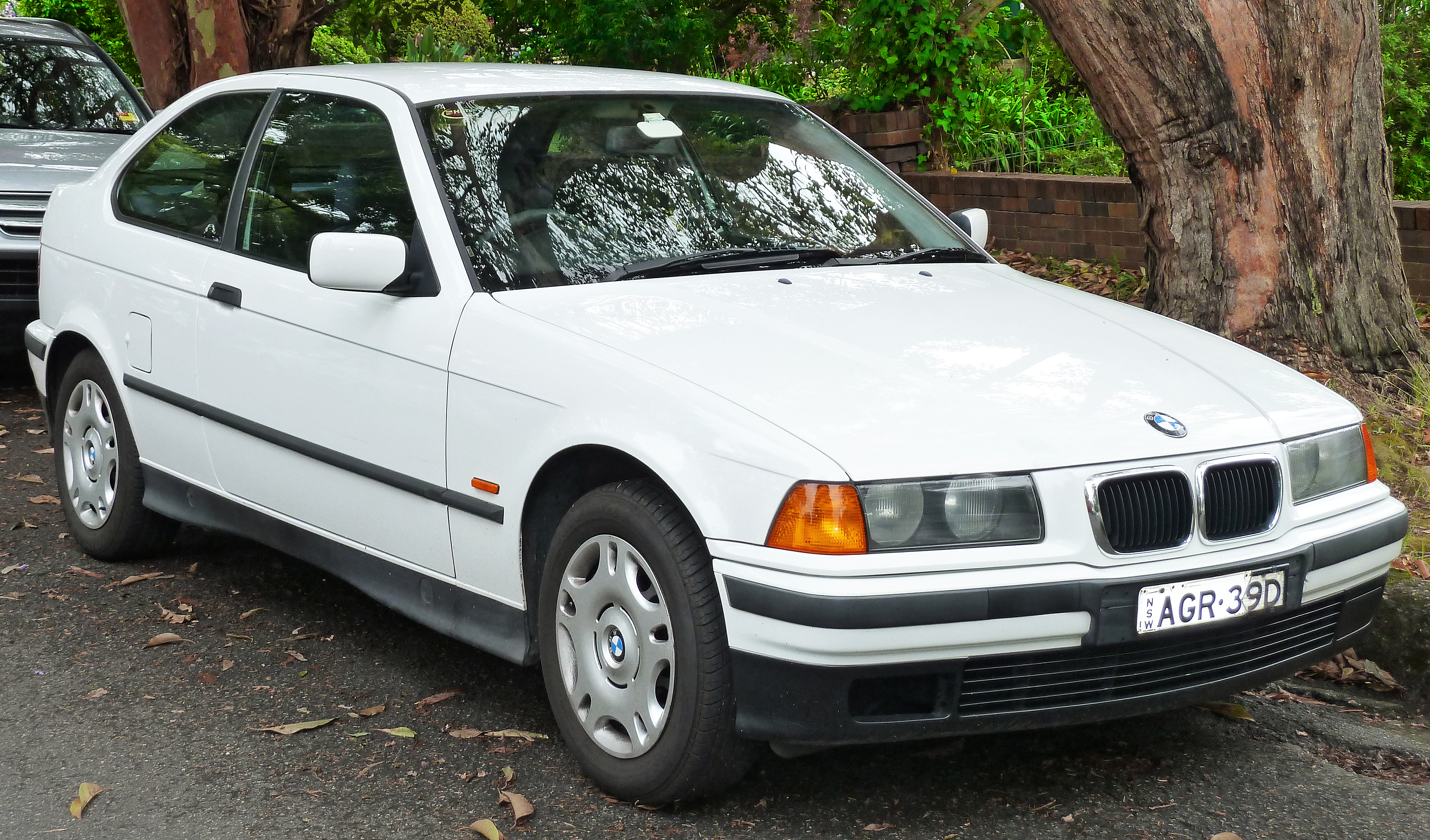
Post-facelift 316i front

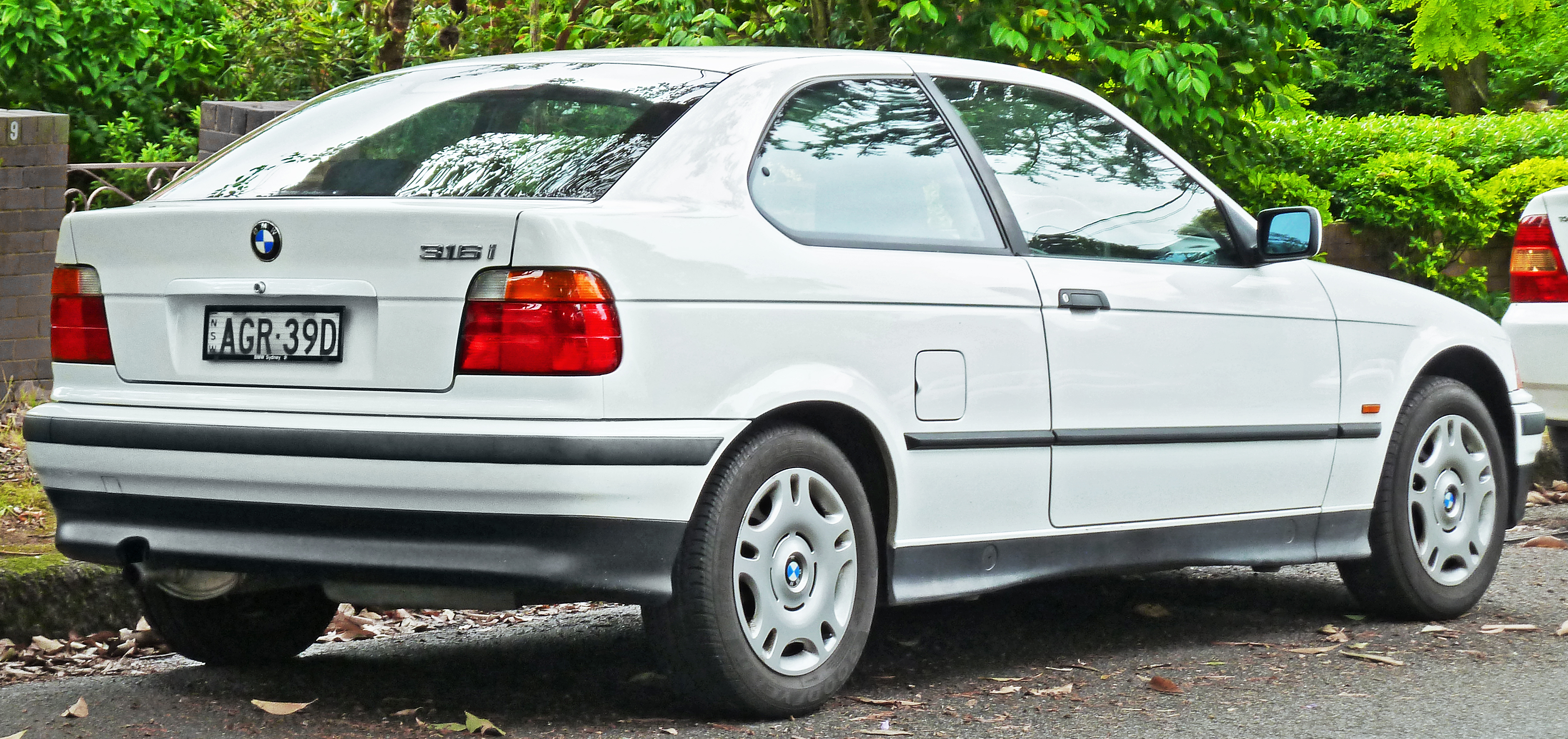
Post-facelift 316i rear

=== Models ===
==== Petrol engines ====
Name	Years	Engine	Power	Torque	0–100 km/h (62 mph)	Top speed
316i	1994–1999	1.6 L M43B16 I4	75 kW (102 PS; 101 hp) at 5,500 rpm	150 N⋅m (111 lb⋅ft) at 3,900 rpm	12.3 seconds	188 km/h (117 mph)
316i	1999–2000	1.9 L M43B19 I4	77 kW (105 PS; 103 hp) at 5,300 rpm	165 N⋅m (122 lb⋅ft) at 2,500 rpm	11.9 seconds	190 km/h (118 mph)
316g*	1995–2000	1.6 L M43B16 I4	64 kW (87 PS; 86 hp) at 5,500 rpm	127 N⋅m (94 lb⋅ft) at 3,900 rpm	15.6 seconds	-
318ti	1994–1995	1.8 L M42B18 I4	103 kW (140 PS; 138 hp) at 6,000 rpm	175 N⋅m (129 lb⋅ft) at 4,500 rpm	9.9 seconds	209 km/h (130 mph)
318ti	1995–1998	1.9 L M44B19 I4	103 kW (140 PS; 138 hp) at 6,000 rpm	180 N⋅m (133 lb⋅ft) at 4,300 rpm	9.9 seconds	209 km/h (130 mph)
323ti	1997–2000	2.5 L M52B25 I6	125 kW (170 PS; 168 hp) at 5,500 rpm	245 N⋅m (181 lb⋅ft) at 3,950 rpm	7.8 seconds	230 km/h (143 mph)

* Bivalent drive: The 316g can run either on gasoline or compressed natural gas (CNG). Output is 75 kW (102 PS) when running on gasoline.

==== Diesel engines ====
Name	Years	Engine	Power	Torque	0–100 km/h (62 mph)	Top speed
318tds (diesel)	1995–2000	1.7 L M41D17 turbo I4	66 kW (90 PS; 89 hp) at 4,400 rpm	190 N⋅m (140 lb⋅ft) at 2,000 rpm	13.9 seconds	175 km/h (109 mph)

==== M3 Compact prototype ====
In 1996, to celebrate the 50th birthday of the German automobile magazine Auto, Motor und Sport, BMW M hand-built one M3 Compact. The car embodied all the technical and optical characteristics of the standard E36 M3, but in the compact body. Quad exhaust tips, Recaro sports seats, four-point seatbelts, an Alcantara steering wheel and gear lever were specific for this model.

=== Reception and sales figures ===
The E36 Compact received a positive reception, as it retained the ride/handling compromise of the saloon and coupe, with the Compact being more responsive (due to lighter weight) and more prone to oversteer (due to its different suspension), while also having a practical cargo hold. The pricing was also attractive, as the North American base price of the Compact (318ti) was $20,370 USD which undercut the next-cheapest BMW 3 Series (the 318i saloon) by $5070 USD.

The E36 Compact was popular in its home market in Europe, which prompted rival Mercedes-Benz to include a hatchback style for its C-Class lineup, known as the C-Class SportCoupé. Based on the success of the Saab 900 and Acura Integra, BMW imported the E36 Compact for North America in late 1994 (for the 1995 model year) but ceased in 1999 after a comparatively short four-year run due to a combination of poor sales, and BMW's decision to phase out all four-cylinder vehicles in the United States. The failure of the E36 Compact precluded the E46 Compact's entry into the North American market, and prompted BMW to reconfigure the BMW Compact's successor, the BMW 1 Series, from a liftback to a coupe before attempting to market the car in North America again. Similarly, the C-Class SportCoupé had a short sales run in North America and was withdrawn from that market while the saloon/wagon remained available.

The total production for 1993 to 1999 (ie excluding 2000, the final year of production) is 371,498.

== Second generation (E46/5; 2001) ==
Second generation (E46/5)
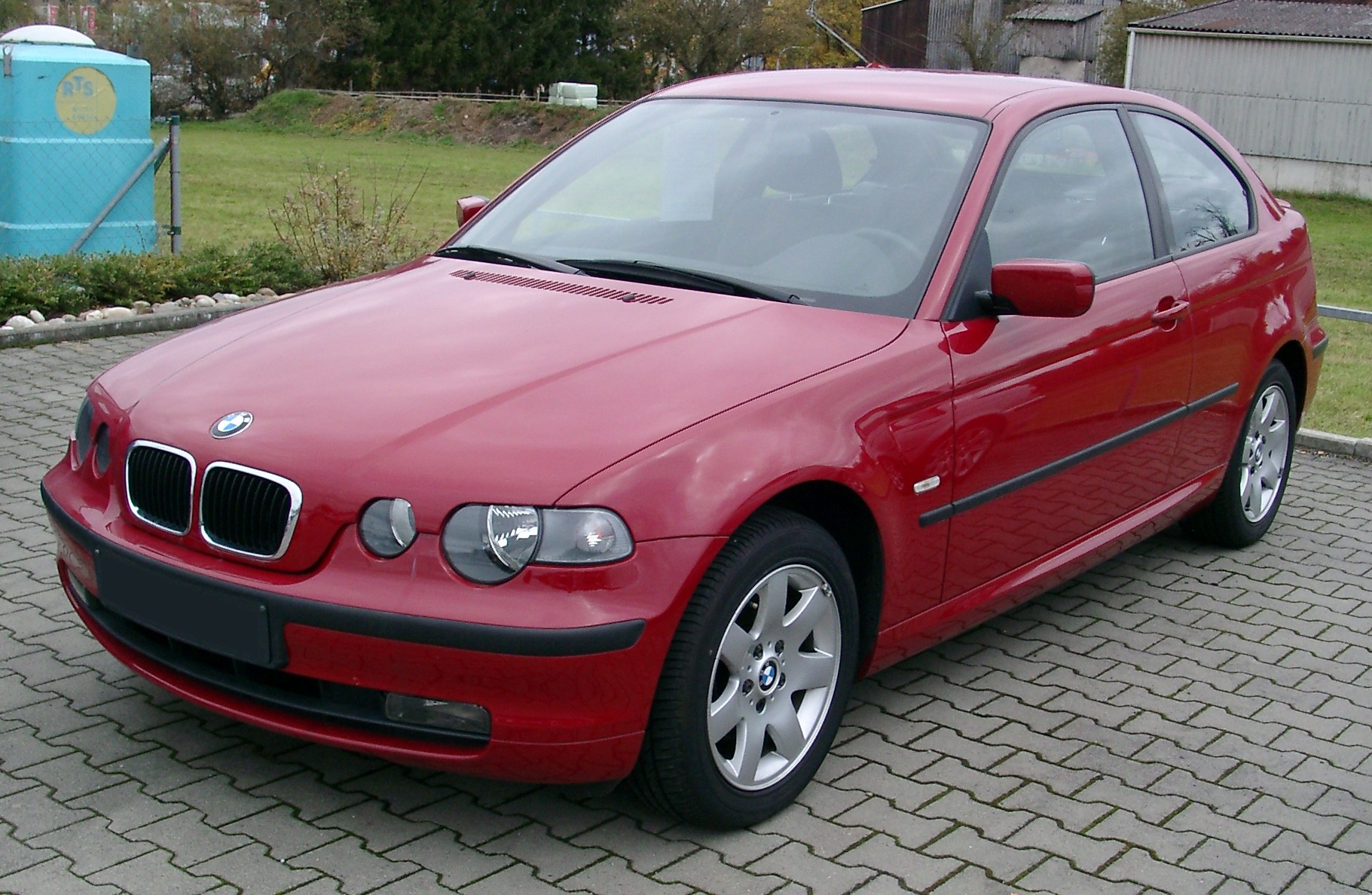

Overview
- Production: 2001–2004

Body and chassis
- Platform: BMW 3 Series (E46)

Powertrain
- Engine: Petrol: 1.6 L N40 I4; 1.6 L N45 I4; 1.8–2.0 L N42 I4; 1.8–2.0 L N46 I4; 2.5 L M54 I6; Diesel: 2.0 L M47 turbo I4

Dimensions
- Wheelbase: 2,725 mm (107.3 in)
- Length: 4,260 mm (167.7 in)
- Width: 1,751 mm (68.9 in)
- Height: 1,408 mm (55.4 in)
- Curb weight: 1,300 kg (2,866 lb)−1,405 kg (3,097 lb)

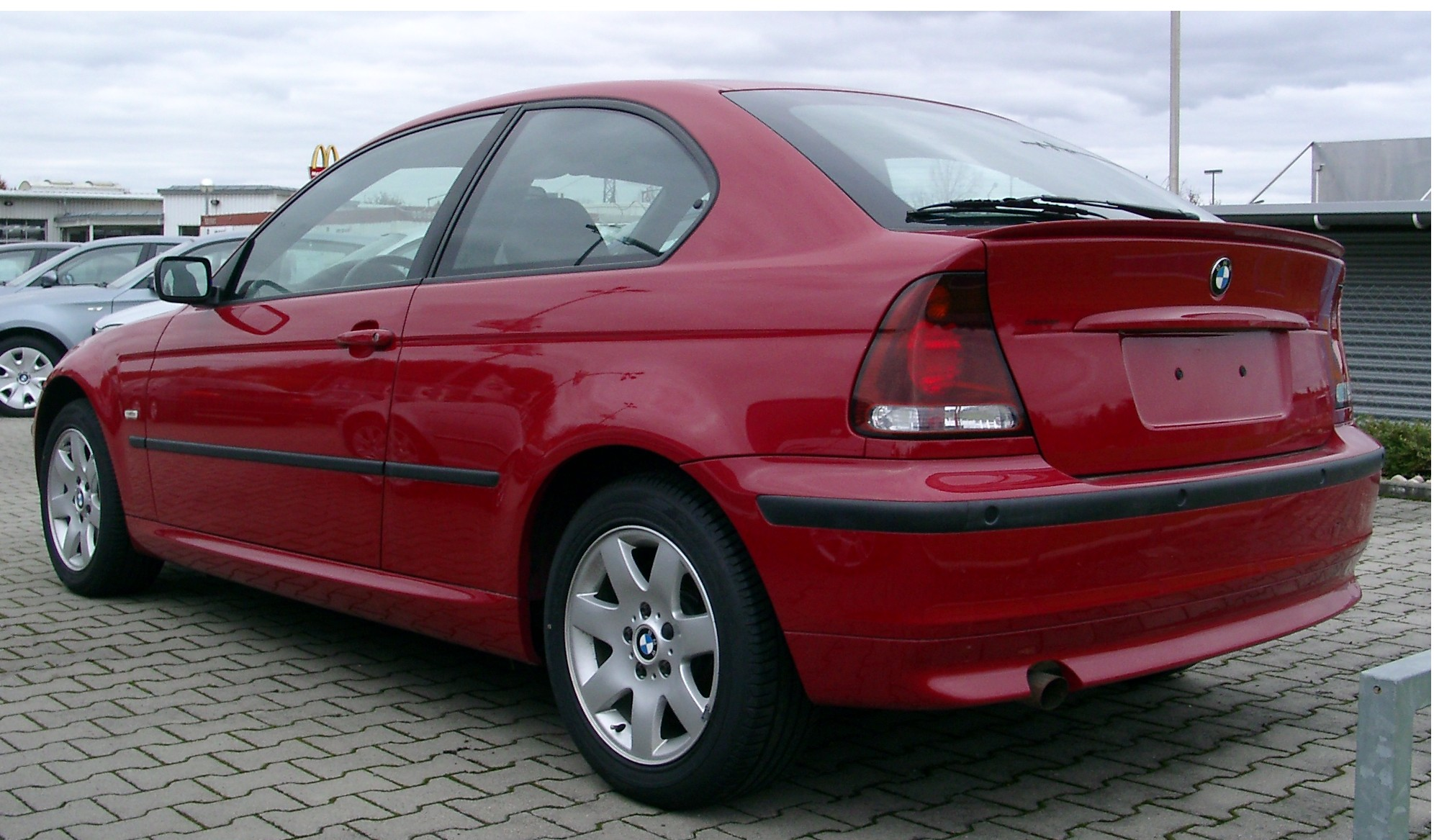
Rear view

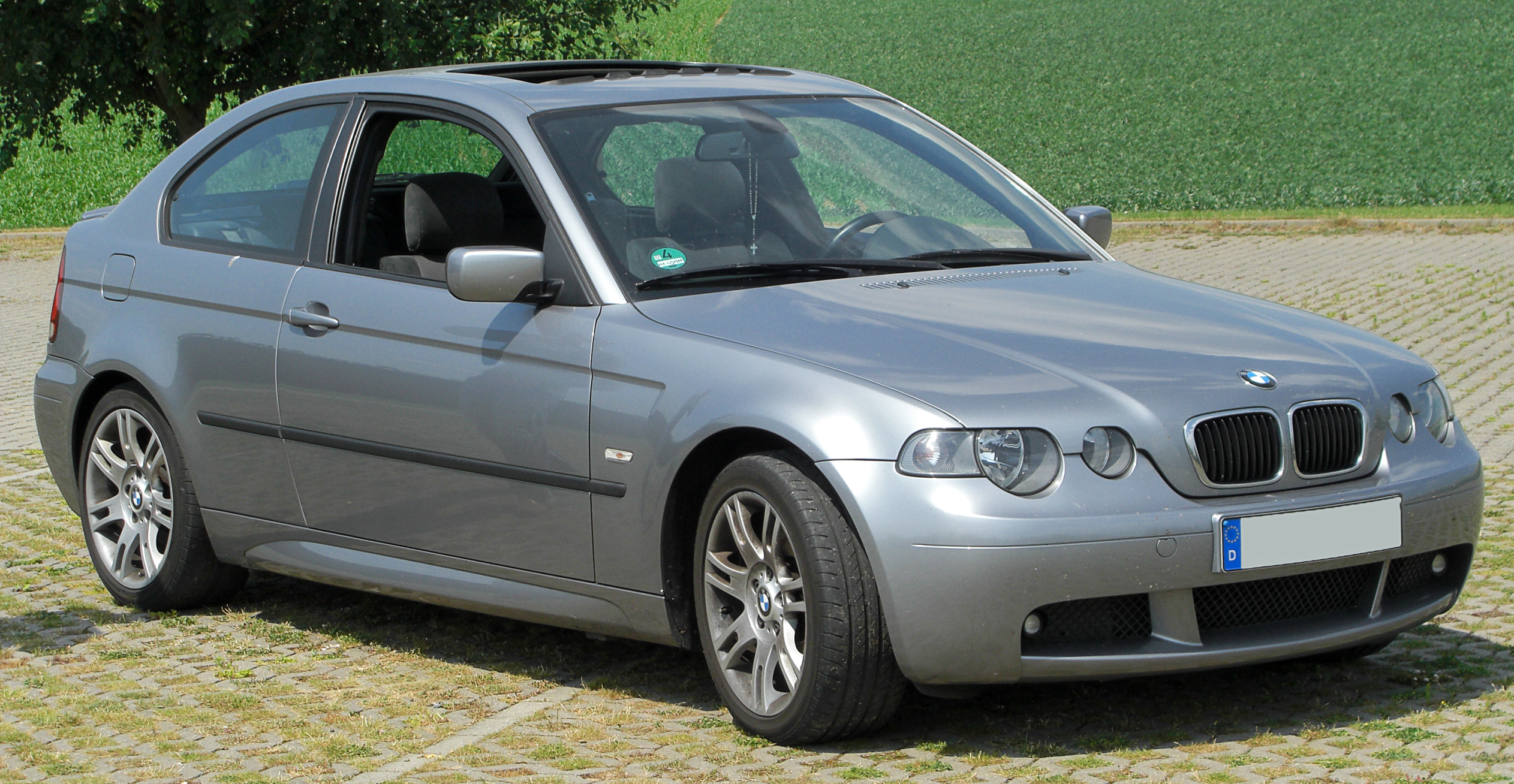

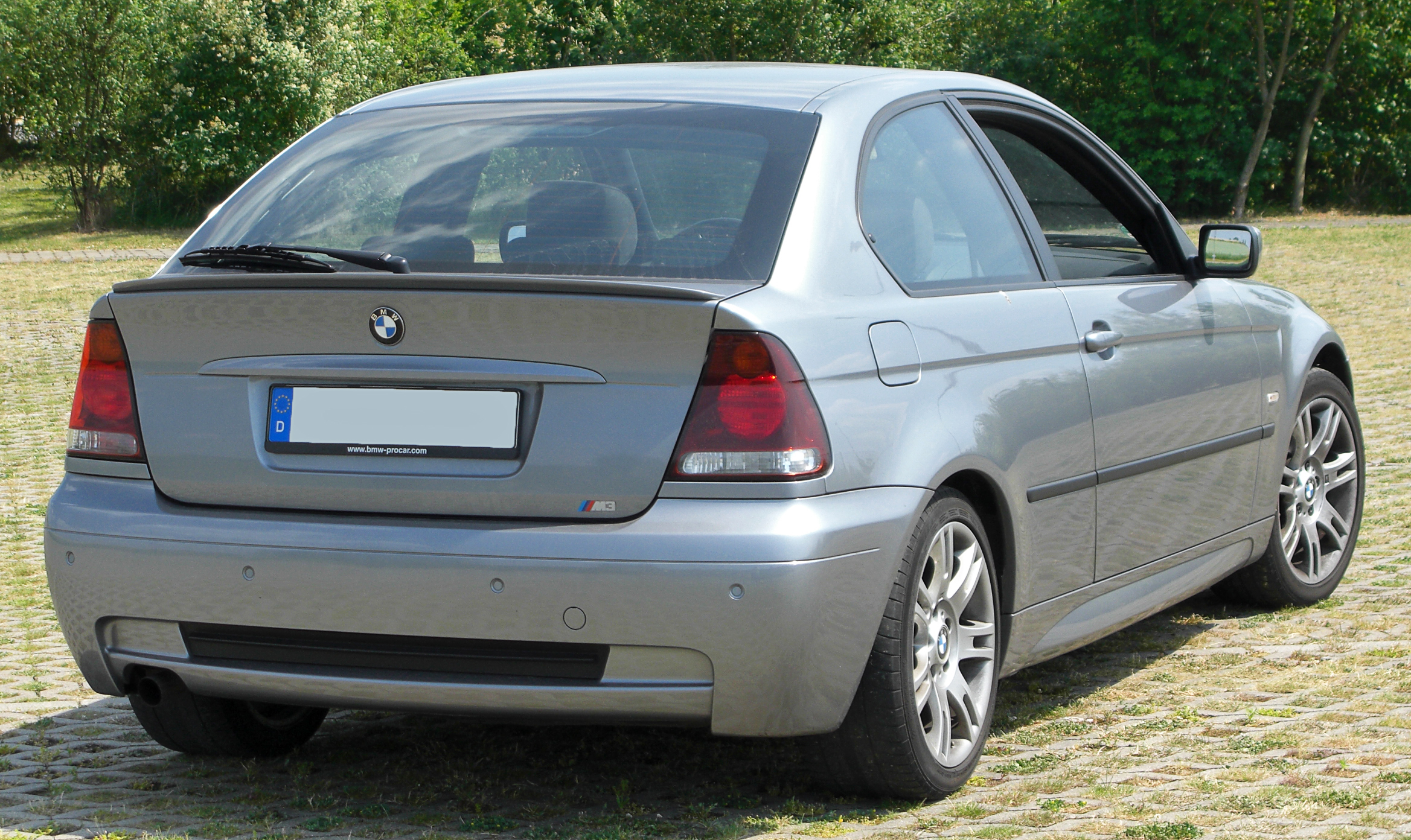
Facelift M-Sport

The 3 Series Compact was redesigned using the then-new E46 platform. This updated Compact has the model code E46/5. It was first presented at the 2001 Geneva Motor Show, and went on sale in European markets in June 2001.

As per the rest of the E46 range, the wheelbase was increased by 25 mm (1.0 in). The overall length is also increased by 52 mm (2.0 in).

The exterior styling has several differences to the rest of the E46 3 Series range, notably the distinctive headlights and tail-lights. There is a unique set of doors with framed windows for the E46/5, rather than adopting those of the E46 saloon/wagon or the frameless ones of the E46 coupé. Mechanically, the Compact shares many elements with the rest of the E46 range, however the steering rack has a faster ratio.

The E46/5 was not sold in North America as its predecessor didn't prove to be a sales success in that market. The E46/5 was not as successful as the E36/5, even though BMW had fixed many of the E36/5's shortcomings (limited range of engines, rear-seating room). While lauded as a driver's car, the E46/5 received some criticism for its unique headlights and tail-lights which were considered unattractive compared to the rest of the E46 lineup.

=== Transmissions ===
Transmission options are mostly the same as the equivalent E46 coupe/sedan model.

From early 2003, the 325ti was available with a 6-speed SMG-II automated manual transmission.

=== Models ===
==== Petrol engines ====
Model	Years	Engine	Power	Torque
316ti	2002–2004	1.6 L (1,596 cc); N40B16 I4*	85 kW (116 PS; 114 hp) at 6,100 rpm	150 N⋅m (111 lbf⋅ft) at 4,300 rpm
316ti	2004	1.6 L (1,596 cc); N45B16 I4†	85 kW (116 PS; 114 hp) at 6,000 rpm	150 N⋅m (111 lbf⋅ft) at 4,300 rpm
316ti	2001–2004	1.8 L (1,796 cc); N42B18 I4	85 kW (116 PS; 114 hp) at 5,600 rpm	175 N⋅m (129 lbf⋅ft) at 3,750 rpm
316ti	2004	1.8 L (1,796 cc); N46B18 I4	85 kW (116 PS; 114 hp) at 5,600 rpm	175 N⋅m (129 lbf⋅ft) at 3,750 rpm
318ti	2001–2004	2.0 L (1,995 cc); N42B20 I4	105 kW (143 PS; 141 hp) at 6,000 rpm	200 N⋅m (148 lbf⋅ft) at 3,750 rpm
318ti	2004	2.0 L (1,995 cc); N46B20A I4	105 kW (143 PS; 141 hp) at 6,000 rpm	200 N⋅m (148 lbf⋅ft) at 3,750 rpm
325ti	2001–2004	2.5 L (2,494 cc); M54B25 I6	141 kW (192 PS; 189 hp) at 6,000 rpm	245 N⋅m (181 lbf⋅ft) at 3,500 rpm

* Used instead of the N42 engine in countries where vehicles tax charges favour smaller engines.
† Used instead of the N46 engine in countries where vehicles tax charges favour smaller engines.

==== Diesel engines ====
Model	Years	Engine	Power	Torque
318td	2003–2004	2.0 L (1,951 cc); M47D20 turbo I4	85 kW (116 PS; 114 hp) at 4,000 rpm	280 N⋅m (207 lb⋅ft) at 1,750 rpm
320td	2001–2004	2.0 L (1,951 cc); M47D20TÜ turbo I4	110 kW (150 PS; 148 hp) at 4,000 rpm	330 N⋅m (243 lb⋅ft) at 2,000 rpm
