= List of BMW engines =

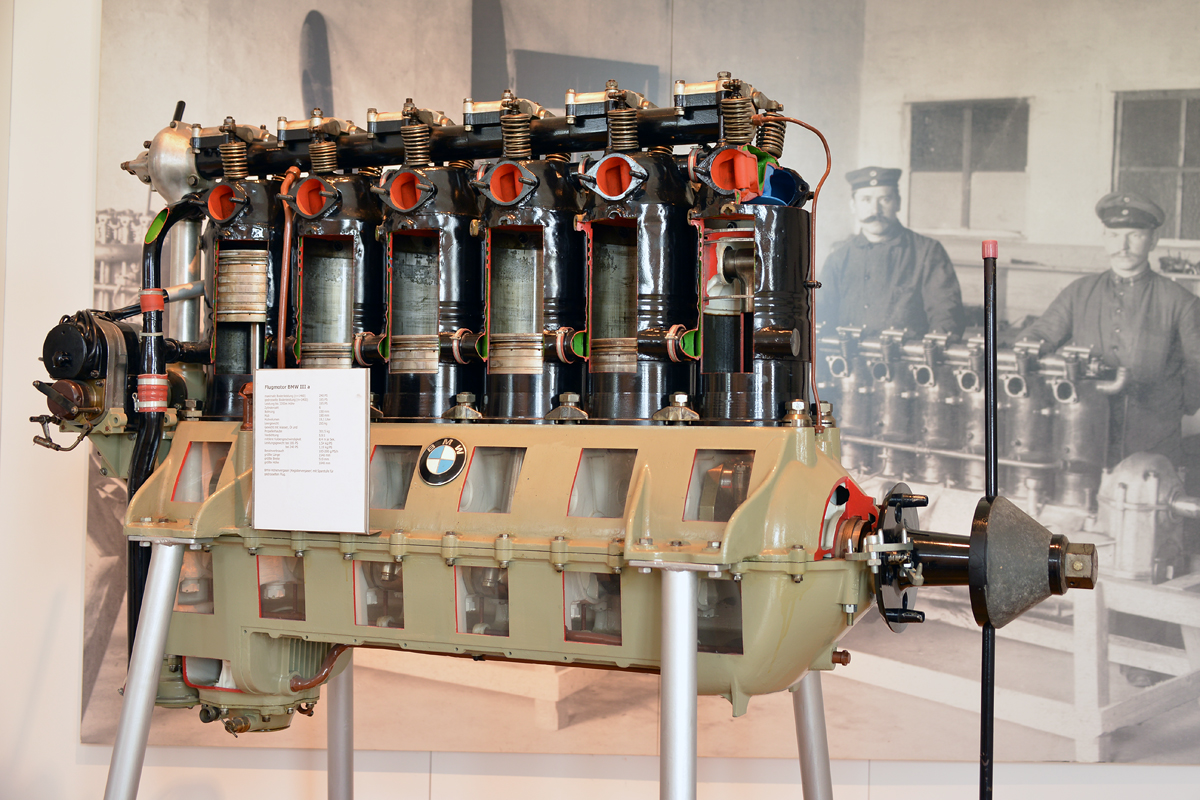
1917—1919 BMW IIIa inline-six aircraft engine- the first engine produced by BMW

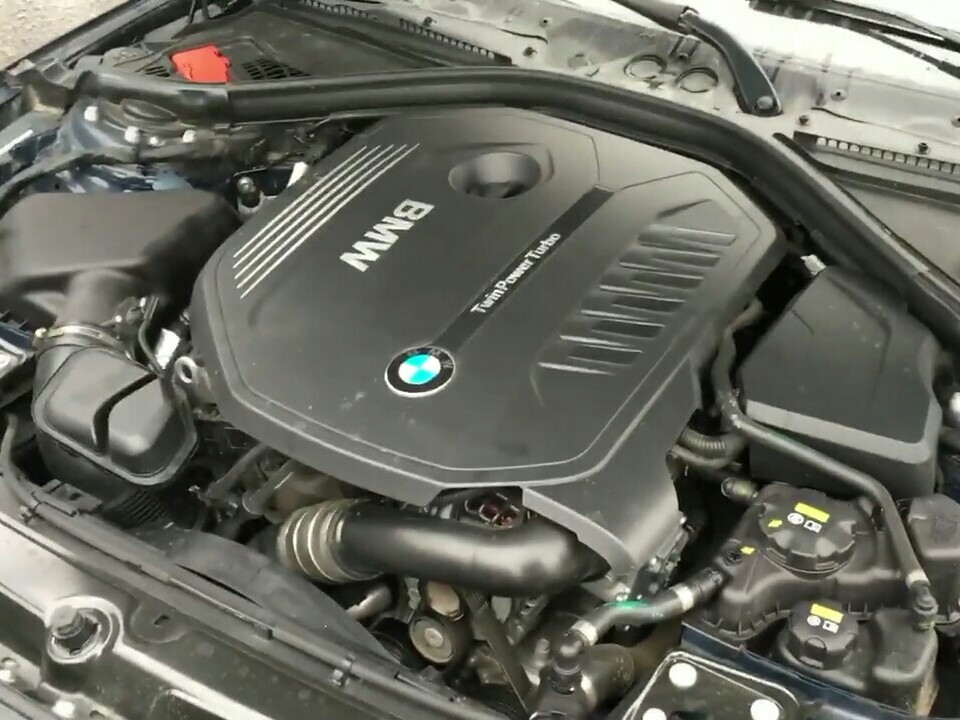
2015—present BMW B58 inline-six automotive engine

BMW has been producing engines for automobiles, motorcycles and aircraft since 1917, when the company began production of an inline-six aircraft engine. They have been producing automobile engines since 1933.

== Automotive petrol engines ==
BMW is well known for its history of inline-six (straight-six) engines, a layout it continues to use to this day despite most other manufacturers switching to a V6 layout. The more common inline-four and V8 layouts are also produced by BMW, and at times the company has produced inline-three, V10 and V12 engines, BMW also engineered non-production customised engines especially for motorsports which include the M12/13 1.5-Liter straight 4 piston turbocharged engine from 1982 to 1987 for Brabham, Arrows and Benetton Formula One teams, the M12 engine engineered by BMW for Formula One held the record for the most powerful internal combustion engine of the world in the 80's and 90's. The E41/P83 3.0-Liter V10 from 2000 to 2005 for Williams F1 Team and the P86/8 2.4-Liter V8 for their own F1 team partnering with Sauber F1 from 2006 to 2009, with which the company enjoyed its first and best finish at the 2008 Canadian Grand Prix as a full works F1 manufacturer team, finishing the race with their winning driver Robert Kubica, and Nick Heidfeld in second place.

British super car manufacturer McLaren Automotive, a manufacturer of road-going sports cars based on Formula One technology, decided to work with BMW for the development of their first ever production car—the McLaren F1 in 1993 for the engineering and customization of its engine—the S70/2, which had a 6.1-Liter 60° V12 DOHC configuration. Only 106 units of the cars were produced by McLaren, the S70 engine holding the record of the fewest production engines by BMW to date.

Prototype V16 engines have been made despite not reaching production. These prototypes were the 1987 BMW Goldfisch V16 6.7 litre engine and the 2004 Rolls-Royce 100EX 9.0 litre engine. BMW has also made prototype V6 engines

Automotive petrol engines
Engine code	Configuration	Years	Displacement	Fuel system
B38	Inline-three turbo	2013–present	1.2–1.5 L	Direct injection
M10	Inline-four N.A.	1960–1988	1.5–2.0 L	Carburetor / Mechanical and electronic fuel injection
S14	Inline-four N.A.	1986–1990	2.0–2.5 L	
M40	Inline-four N.A.	1987–1995	1.6–1.8 L	Fuel injection
M42	Inline-four N.A.	1989–1996	1.8 L	Fuel injection
M43	Inline-four N.A.	1991–2002	1.6–1.9 L	Fuel injection / CNG
M44	Inline-four N.A.	1996–2001	1.9 L	
N40	Inline-four N.A.	2001–2004	1.6 L	
N42	Inline-four N.A.	2001–2004	1.8–2.0 L	
N45	Inline-four N.A.	2004–2011	1.6-2.0 L	
N46	Inline-four N.A.	2004–2007	1.8–2.0 L	Manifold injection
N43	Inline-four N.A.	2007–2011	1.6–2.0 L	Direct injection
N13	Inline-four turbo	2011–2015	1.6 L	Direct injection
N20	Inline-four turbo	2011–2017	1.6–2.0 L	Direct injection
N26	Inline-four turbo	2012–2016	2.0 L	Direct injection; Super Ultra-Low Emissions Vehicle
B46 BMW B48#B46	Inline-four turbo	2016–2017	2.0 L	Direct injection; Super Ultra-Low Emissions Vehicle
B48	Inline-four turbo	2015–present	1.6–2.0 L	Direct injection
P48	Inline-four turbo	2019–2020	2.0 L	Direct injection
M78	Straight-six N.A.	1933–1950	1.2-1.9 L	
M328	Straight-six N.A.	1936–1940	2.0-2.1 L	
M335	Straight-six N.A.	1939–1941	3.5 L	
M337	Straight-six N.A.	1952–1958	2.0-2.1 L	
M30	Straight-six N.A.	1968–1994	2.5-3.5 L	Carburetor / Fuel injection
M20	Straight-six N.A.	1977–1993	2.0-2.7 L	Carburetor / Fuel injection
M88/S38	Straight-six N.A.	1978–1989	3.5-3.8 L	Fuel injection
M102	Straight-six turbo	1980–1982	3.2 L	Fuel injection
M106	Straight-six turbo	1982–1986	3.4 L	Fuel injection
M50	Straight-six N.A.	1989–1996	2.0-2.5 L	
S50	Straight-six N.A.	1992–1999	3.0-3.2 L	
M52	Straight-six N.A.	1994–2000	2.0-2.8 L	
S52	Straight-six N.A.	1996–2000	3.2 L	
M54	Straight-six N.A.	2000–2006	2.2-3.0 L	
S54	Straight-six N.A.	2000–2008	3.2 L	
M56	Straight-six N.A.	2002–2006	2.5 L	Super Ultra-Low Emissions Vehicle from 2003-2006
N51 BMW N52#N51B30	Straight-six N.A.	2007–2013	3.0 L	Port injection; Super Ultra-Low Emissions Vehicle
N52	Straight-six N.A.	2004–2015	2.5-3.0 L	Port injection
N54	Straight-six turbo	2006–2016	3.0 L	Direct injection
N53	Straight-six N.A.	2006–2013	2.5-3.0 L	Direct injection
N55	Straight-six turbo	2009–present	3.0 L	Direct injection
S55	Straight-six turbo	2014–2021	3.0 L	Direct injection
B58	Straight-six turbo	2015–present	3.0 L	Direct injection, dual injection since TU2
S58	Straight-six turbo	2019–present	3.0 L	Direct injection
OHV V8	V8 N.A.	1954–1965	2.6-3.2 L	
M60	V8 N.A.	1992–1996	3.0-4.0 L	Fuel injection
M62	V8 N.A.	1996–2005	3.5-4.8 L	
S62	V8 N.A.	1998–2006	4.9 L	
P60B40	V8 N.A.	2001–2005	4.0 L	Direct injection
N62	V8 N.A.	2001–2010	3.6-4.8 L	
S65	V8 N.A.	2007–2013	4.0-4.4 L	
N63	V8 turbo	2008–present	4.4 L	Direct injection
S63	V8 turbo	2009–present	4.4 L	
P66	V8 turbo	2012–present	4.0 L	Direct injection
S68	V8 turbo MHEV	2022–present	4.4-4.6 L	
E41/P80	V8 & V10 N.A.	2000–2009	2.4-3.0 L	Fuel injection
S85	V10 N.A.	2005–2010	5.0 L	
M70	V12 N.A.	1987–1996	5.0 L	
S70	V12 N.A.	1992–2000	5.6-6.1 L	
M73	V12 N.A.	1993–2002	5.4 L	
N73	V12 N.A.	2003–2016	6.0-6.75 L	Direct injection
N74	V12 turbo	2009–2022	6.0-6.75 L	Direct injection

== Automotive diesel engines ==
Automotive diesel engines
Engine code	Configuration	Years	Displacement
B37	Inline-three turbo	2012	1.5 L
M41	Inline-four turbo	1994–2000	1.7 L
M47	Inline-four turbo	1998–2007	2.0 L
N47	Inline-four turbo	2007–2014	2.0 L
B47	Inline-four turbo	2013–present	2.0 L
M21	Inline-six turbo*	1983–1993	2.4 L
M51	Inline-six turbo	1991–2000	2.5 L
M57	Inline-six turbo	1998–2013	2.5-3.0 L
N57	Inline-six turbo	2008–2020	3.0 L
B57	Inline-six turbo	2015–present	3.0 L
M67	V8 turbo	1998–2009	3.9-4.4 L

* Also produced in a naturally aspirated configuration.

== Aircraft engines ==
=== Straight-six ===
- 1917–1919 – IIIa, 19.1 L straight-six — first BMW corporate product of any kind
- 1919, 1925–? – IV, 23.5 L straight-six
- 1926–1927 - V, 22.9 L straight-six

=== V12 ===
- VI, 38.2 L V12
- 1926–1937 – VI, 45.8 L V12
- VIIa supercharged V12
- 116 (initially XII), projected 20.7 L V12, never manufactured
- 117 (initially XV), projected 36.0 L V12, never manufactured

=== Radial ===
- X, 2.2 L 5-cylinder
  - Xa, 2.9 L 5-cylinder
- 1933–? – 132, 27.7 L 9-cylinder, development of Pratt & Whitney R-1690 Hornet built under licence
  - 1935 – 114, prototype diesel development of 132
  - 1935 – BMW-Lanova 114 V-4, supercharged liquid-cooled diesel prototype development of 114
- 1939 - 139, prototype 18-cylinder double-row; two-row variant of 132
- 1939–1945 – 801, 41.8 L supercharged 14-cylinder double row
- 1942 – 802, projected 53.7 L supercharged 18-cylinder double row; 18-cylinder version of 801
- 803, projected 83.5 L supercharged 28-cylinder 4-row liquid-cooled; essentially two 801s coupled together
- 1936–1944 – Bramo 323, 26.8 L supercharged 9-cylinder, inherited when BMW bought Bramo in 1939

=== Jet ===
- 1944–1945 – 003 axial flow turbojet
- 1997–2000 – BMW Rolls-Royce BR700 family of turbofans; Rolls-Royce plc bought out the venture in 2000.
