= BMW M43 =

BMW M43 engine
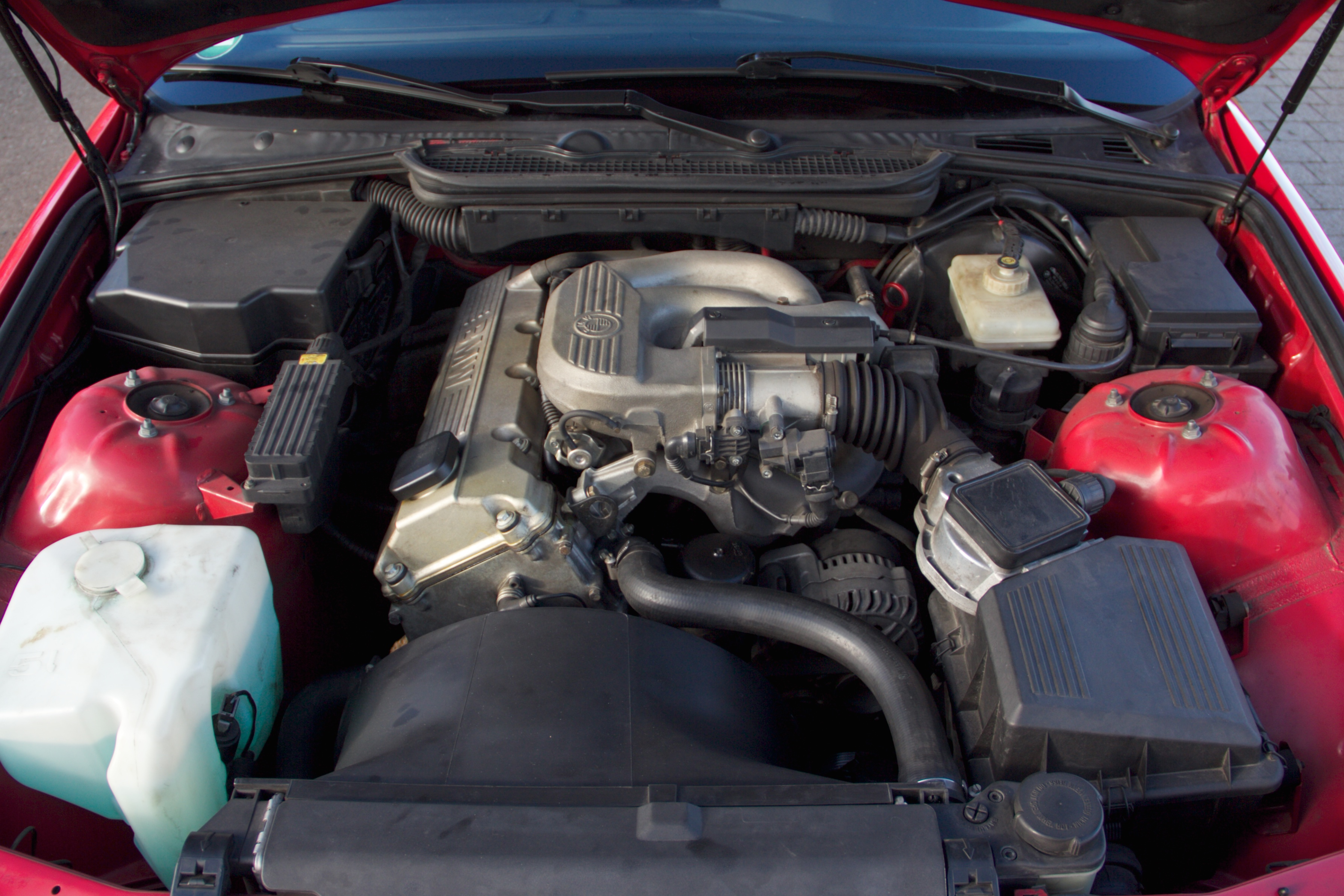

Overview
- Production: 1991–2002

Layout
- Configuration: Inline-4
- Displacement: 1.6 L (1,596 cc); 1.8 L (1,796 cc); 1.9 L (1,895 cc)
- Cylinder bore: 84 mm (3.31 in); 85 mm (3.35 in)
- Piston stroke: 72 mm (2.83 in); 81 mm (3.19 in); 83.5 mm (3.29 in)
- Cylinder block material: Cast iron
- Cylinder head material: Aluminium
- Valvetrain: SOHC, 8V

Combustion
- Fuel type: Petrol, CNG

Chronology
- Predecessor: BMW M40
- Successor: BMW N42

The BMW M43 is a single overhead camshaft eight valve four-cylinder petrol engine which was produced from 1991 to 2002. The M43 was used in lower powered models, while higher power models had the BMW M42 and later BMW M44 both sixteen valve DOHC engines. The M43 was produced at the Steyr engine plant.

A version using natural gas was produced for the E36 318i and the E34 518i.

Following the introduction of the BMW N42 and the lower powered N40 engine in 2001, the M43 began to be phased out.

== Design ==
Compared with the BMW M40 predecessor, the M43 features camshaft position sensor and knock sensor as well as roller rockers and a timing chain (instead of the M40's finger rockers and timing belt). It also introduced a dual length intake manifold ("DISA"), to provide torque across a wider rev range.

The 1.9 litre version - the M43TU - was introduced in Autumn 1998 for use in the BMW E46 316i and 318i as well as the E36 316i Compact and BMW Z3. Basically similar to the outgoing 1.8 unit, the M43TU used the short block from the M44 twin cam engine with the rear mounted crank sensor and a new crankshaft pulley without a TDC reference cut out. The cylinder head is similar to the previous engine but the intake manifold was revised. The engine management system is Bosch Motronic, DME 1.7.3.

== Versions ==
Version	Displacement	Power	Torque	Year	Note
M43B16	1,596 cc (97.4 cu in)	75 kW (101 hp) at 5500 rpm	150 N⋅m (111 lb⋅ft) at 3900 rpm	1991-1999	
M43B16	1,596 cc (97.4 cu in)	60 kW (80 hp) at 5500 rpm	127 N⋅m (94 lb⋅ft) at 3900 rpm	1995-2000	CNG
M43B18	1,796 cc (109.6 cu in)	85 kW (114 hp) at 5500 rpm	168 N⋅m (124 lb⋅ft) at 3900 rpm	1993	
M43B18	1,796 cc (109.6 cu in)	74 kW (99 hp) at 5500 rpm	142 N⋅m (105 lb⋅ft) at 3900 rpm	1995-1996	CNG
M43B19	1,895 cc (115.6 cu in)	87 kW (117 hp) at 5500 rpm	180 N⋅m (133 lb⋅ft) at 3900 rpm	1998	
M43B19	1,895 cc (115.6 cu in)	77 kW (103 hp) at 5300 rpm	165 N⋅m (122 lb⋅ft) at 2500 rpm	1999	

=== M43B16 ===
The 1,596 cc (97.4 cu in) M43B16 produces 75 kW (101 hp) and 150 N⋅m (111 lb⋅ft) of torque. It uses the Bosch Motronic 1.7.x and Bosch BMS43 engine management system. There was also a natural gas-powered version of this car (also able to run on petrol) for the 1995 BMW 316g Compact.

Applications:

- 1994-1998 E36 316i
- 1995-2000 E36/5 316g Compact
- 1998-1999 E46 316i

Engine Management Systems:

- 1993-09/1995 Bosch Motronic 1.7.2
- 1995-09/1997 Bosch Motronic 1.7.3
- 1997-2000 BMS43

=== M43B18 ===
The M43B18 has a 1,796 cc (109.6 cu in) displacement. It produces 85 kW (114 hp) and 124 lb⋅ft (168 N⋅m) and uses the Bosch Motronic 1.7.1 fuel injection system. There was also a less powerful natural gas-powered version of this car (also able to run on petrol) for the BMW 518g Touring (E34). This model was only available for two years.

Applications:

- 1992-1998 E36 318i
- 1994-1996 E34 518i
- 1995-1996 E34 518g Touring
- 1995-2001 Z3 1.8

=== M43B19 ===
The M43B19 (also known as the "M43TÜ") is the largest M43 engine, with a displacement of 1,895 cc (115.6 cu in). It produces up to 87 kW (117 hp) and 180 N⋅m (133 lb⋅ft), and uses BMW's BMS 46 engine management system. The 77 kW (105 PS) versions do not have the DISA intake manifold and also have a smaller camshaft compared to the 118 PS versions. Note the M43B16, M43B18 and the M43B19 (118 PS version) all have the same camshaft.

Applications— 77 kW (103 hp) and 165 N⋅m (122 lb⋅ft):

- 1999-2001 E36 316i Compact
- 1999-2002 E46 316i

Applications— 87 kW (117 hp) and 180 N⋅m (133 lb⋅ft):

- 1998-2001 E46 318i/318Ci
- 1999 -2002 Z3 1.9

== See also ==
- List of BMW engines
