= BMW M40 =

BMW M40 engine
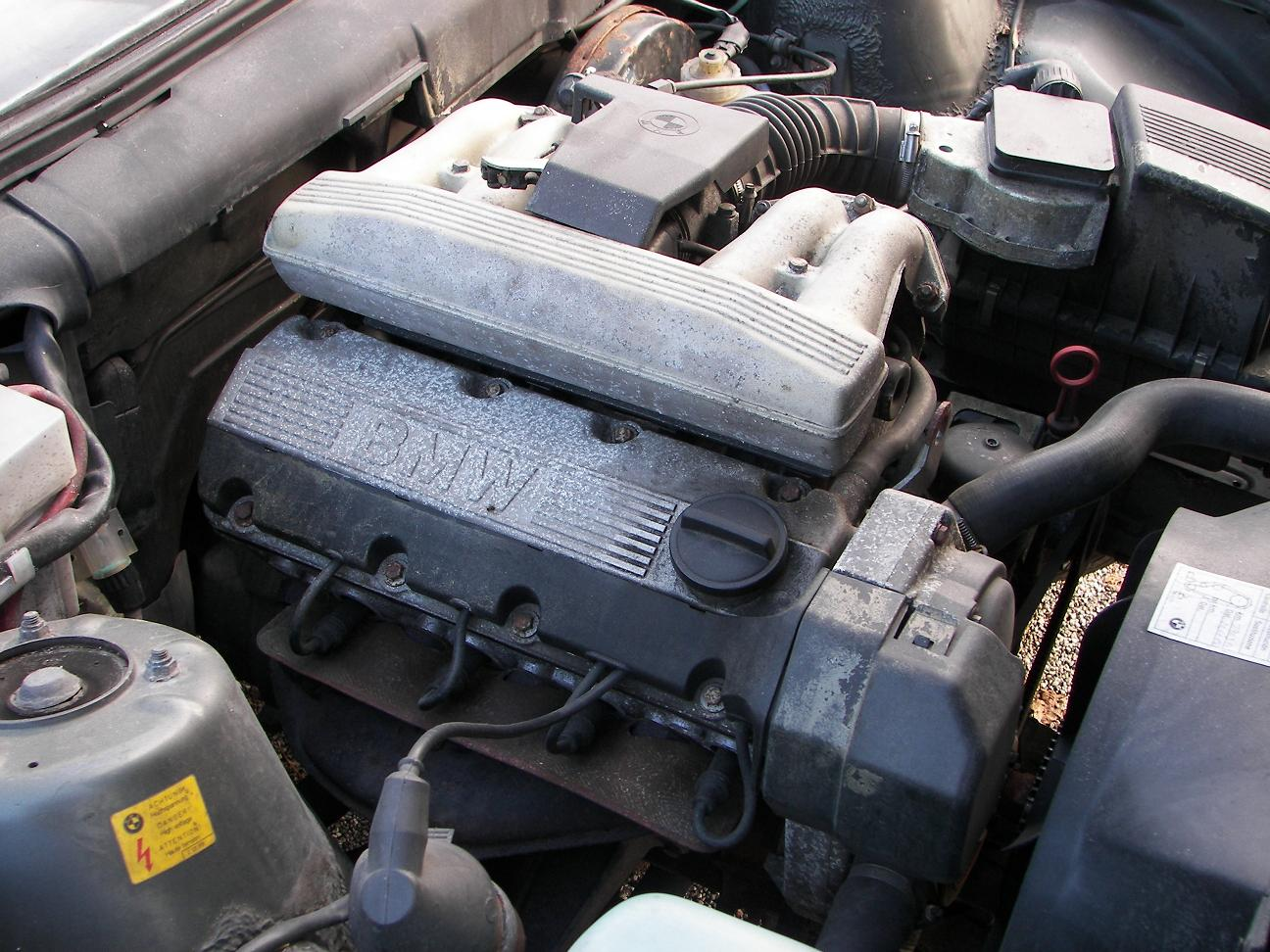

Overview
- Manufacturer: BMW
- Production: 1987–1994

Layout
- Configuration: Naturally aspirated straight-4
- Displacement: 1.6 L (1,596 cc); 1.8 L (1,796 cc)
- Cylinder bore: 84 mm (3.31 in)
- Piston stroke: 72 mm (2.83 in); 81 mm (3.19 in)
- Cylinder block material: Cast iron
- Cylinder head material: Aluminium
- Valvetrain: SOHC

Combustion
- Fuel system: Fuel injection
- Management: Bosch Motronic 1.3 or 1.7
- Fuel type: Petrol
- Cooling system: Water cooled

Chronology
- Predecessor: BMW M10
- Successor: BMW M43

The BMW M40 is an SOHC straight-four petrol engine which was produced from 1987 to 1994. It served as BMW's base model four-cylinder engine and was produced alongside the higher performance BMW M42 DOHC four-cylinder engine from 1989 onwards.

Compared with its M10 predecessor, the M40 uses a belt-driven camshaft, and hydraulic tappets. Like the M10, the M40 uses an iron block and an aluminium head. Fuel injection for the E30 versions is Bosch Motronic 1.3, and the E36 versions use Bosch Motronic 1.7.

Following the introduction of the BMW M43 engine in 1991, the M40 began to be phased out.

== Versions ==
Version	Displacement	Power	Torque	Year
M40B16- E30 version	1,596 cc (97.4 cu in)	73 kW (99 PS; 98 hp) at 5,500 rpm	141 N⋅m (104 lb⋅ft) at 4,250 rpm	1987
M40B16- E36 version	1,596 cc (97.4 cu in)	75 kW (102 PS; 101 hp) at 5,500 rpm	143 N⋅m (105 lb⋅ft) at 4,250 rpm	1991
M40B18- E30 version	1,796 cc (109.6 cu in)	83 kW (113 PS; 111 hp) at 5,500 rpm	162 N⋅m (119 lb⋅ft) at 4,250 rpm	1987
M40B18- E36 version	1,796 cc (109.6 cu in)	85 kW (116 PS; 114 hp) at 5,500 rpm	165 N⋅m (122 lb⋅ft) at 4,250 rpm	1991

== M40B16 ==
The M40B16 is a 1,596 cc (97.4 cu in) version of the M40, which has a bore of 84 mm (3.3 in) and a stroke of 72 mm (2.8 in). It produces 73 kW (98 hp) and 142 N⋅m (105 lb⋅ft).

Applications:

- 1988–1994 316i (E30)
- 1990–1994 316i (E36)
- 1992–1993 Bertone Freeclimber 2

== M40B18 ==
The M40B18 is a 1,796 cc (109.6 cu in) version of the M40, which has a bore of 84 mm (3.3 in) and a stroke of 81 mm (3.2 in). It produces 83 kW (113 PS) and 163 N⋅m (120 lb⋅ft).

Applications:

- 1987–1994 318i (E30)
- 1992–1993 318i (E36)
- 1989-1994 518i (E34)

== See also ==
- List of BMW engines
