= BMW 116 =

1930s German piston aircraft engine

The BMW 116 was a piston aircraft engine developed by BMW in the 1930s. Development work stopped in 1937. The BMW 116 engine was initially known as the BMW XII.

== Specifications (BMW 116) ==
=== General characteristics ===
- Type: V12
- Bore: 130 mm (5.12 in)
- Stroke: 130 mm (5.12 in)
- Displacement: 20.7 L
- Length: 1,637 mm (64.4 in)
- Width: 740 mm (29.1 in)
- Height: 915 mm (36.02 in)
- Dry weight: 470 kg (1,040 lb)

=== Components ===
- Supercharger: radial supercharger
- Fuel system: carburettor
- Cooling system: Liquid cooled

=== Performance ===
- Power output: 620 hp (460 kW)
- Compression ratio: 6.5:1

== See also ==
Comparable engines

- Junkers Jumo 210
- Rolls-Royce Kestrel

Related lists

- List of aircraft engines
