= BMW N42 =

BMW N42 engine

Overview
- Production: 2001–2004

Layout
- Configuration: Inline-4
- Displacement: 1,796 cc (1.8 L); 1,995 cc (2.0 L)
- Cylinder bore: 84 mm (3.31 in)
- Piston stroke: 81 mm (3.19 in); 90 mm (3.54 in)
- Cylinder block material: Aluminium
- Cylinder head material: Aluminium
- Valvetrain: DOHC, with VVT & VVL

Combustion
- Fuel type: Petrol

Chronology
- Predecessor: BMW M43
- Successor: BMW N46

The BMW N42 is a DOHC four-cylinder petrol engine which replaced the BMW M43 and was produced from 2001-2004.

The N42 serves as the basis for the smaller N40 engine (which does not have Valvetronic).

The N42B18 won the 1.4-1.8 L category of the International Engine of the Year awards for 2001.

In 2004, the N42 was replaced by the BMW N46 four-cylinder engine.

== Design ==
Compared with its M43 predecessor, the N42 features a DOHC valvetrain, VANOS (variable valve timing) and an aluminium engine block. It was the first BMW engine to have Valvetronic (variable valve lift).

== Versions ==
Version	Displacement	Power	Torque	Year
N42B18	1.8 L (1,796 cc)	85 kW (116 PS; 114 bhp) at 5,500 rpm	175 N⋅m (129 lb⋅ft) at 3,750 rpm	2001-2004
N42B20	2.0 L (1,995 cc)	105 kW (143 PS; 141 bhp) at 6,000 rpm	200 N⋅m (148 lb⋅ft) at 3,750 rpm	2001-2004

== N42B18 ==
The N42B18 has a displacement of 1,796 cc (109.6 cu in), uses Bosch Motronic ME9.2 engine management and has twin-balancing shafts.

Applications:

- 2001-2004 E46 316i and 316ti

== N42B20 ==
The N42B20 has a displacement of 1,995 cc (121.7 cu in), uses Bosch DME ME9.2 fuel injection and has twin-balancing shafts. The N42B20 redlines at 6,600 rpm.

The N42B20 replaced older engines like the M43TU and M44B19, and was succeeded by the N46 and N45 series.

Key Technologies:

- Double VANOS: Adjusts both intake and exhaust camshaft timing for better torque and efficiency across engine speeds.
- Valvetronic: BMW's variable valve lift system, which eliminates the need for a traditional throttle body and improves fuel economy.
- DISA Manifold: A variable-length intake system that optimizes airflow for low-end torque and high-end power.
- Aluminum Block: Lighter than its cast-iron predecessors, improving weight distribution and fuel economy.

Applications:

- 2001-2004 E46 318i/318Ci/318ti

== N40 ==
BMW N40 engine

Overview
- Production: 2001–2004

Layout
- Configuration: Inline-4
- Displacement: 1.6 L (1,596 cc)
- Cylinder bore: 84 mm (3.31 in)
- Piston stroke: 72 mm (2.83 in)
- Cylinder block material: Aluminium
- Cylinder head material: Aluminium
- Valvetrain: DOHC, with VVT

Combustion
- Fuel type: Petrol

Chronology
- Predecessor: BMW M43
- Successor: BMW N45

The BMW N40 is a DOHC four-cylinder petrol engine which replaced the 1.6 litre versions of the BMW M43. It was produced from 2001-2004 and only sold in several countries, where taxes favoured cars with smaller displacement engines. The N40 was replaced by the BMW N45.

=== Design ===
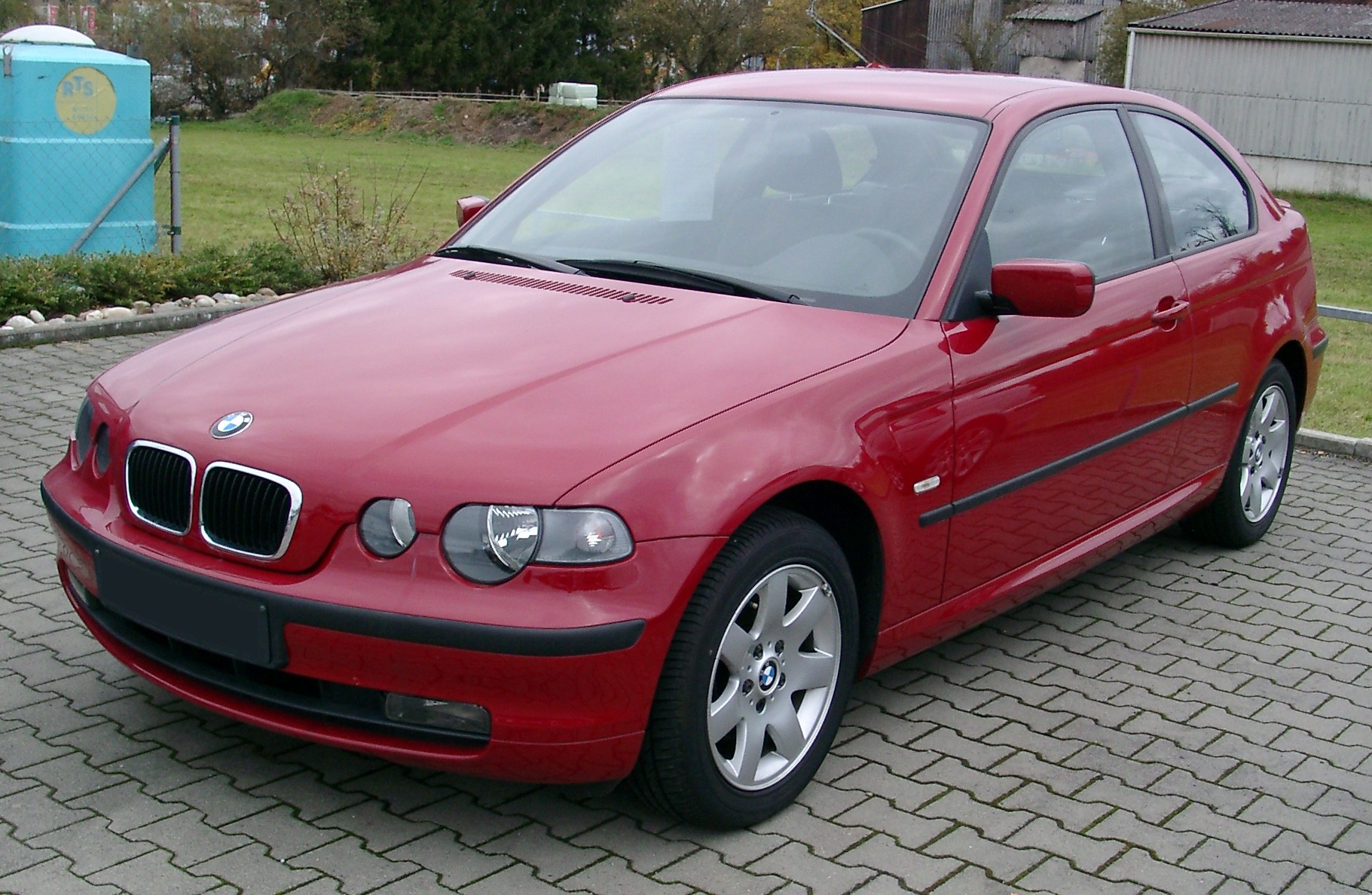
BMW E46/5 316ti

The N40 is based on the BMW N42 engine and uses the same crankcase, pistons and bore size of 84 mm (3.3 in). The redline is 6,500 rpm.

Unlike the N42, the N40 does not have Valvetronic (variable valve lift). The other major difference is a 9 mm (0.4 in) reduction in stroke to 72.0 mm (2.8 in), which results in a smaller displacement than the N42.

=== Versions ===
Version	Displacement	Power	Torque	Years
N40B16	1.6 L (1,596 cc)	85 kW (116 PS; 114 bhp) at 6,100 rpm	150 N⋅m (111 lb⋅ft) at 4,300 rpm	2001–2004

Applications:

- 2001-2005 E46 316i/316ci/316ti (certain markets only)

== See also ==
- BMW
- List of BMW engines
