= BMW M42 =

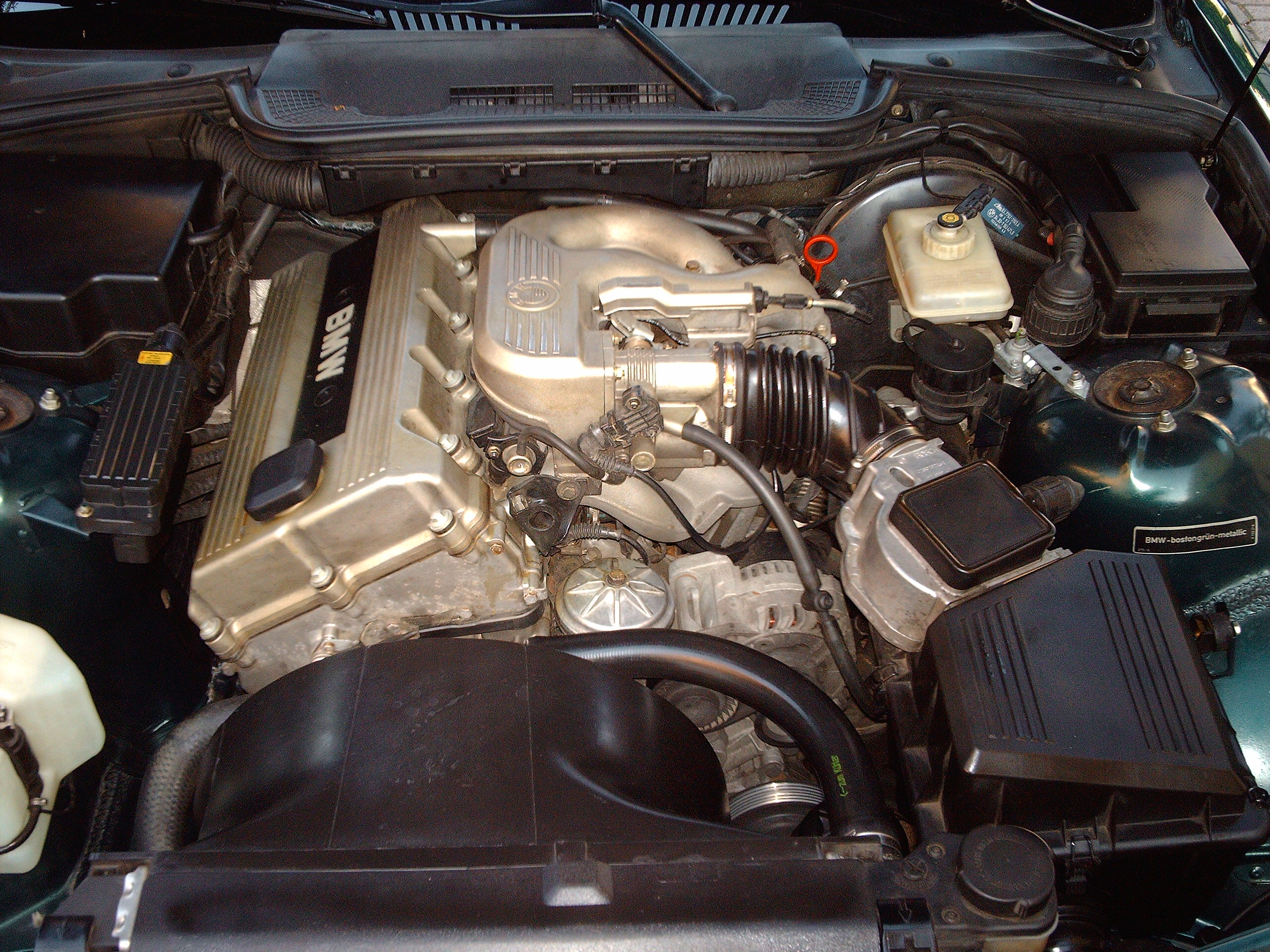

Overview
- Manufacturer: BMW
- Production: 1989–1996

Layout
- Configuration: Naturally aspirated straight-4
- Displacement: 1.8 L (1,796 cc)
- Cylinder bore: 84 mm (3.31 in)
- Piston stroke: 81 mm (3.19 in)
- Cylinder block material: Cast iron
- Cylinder head material: Aluminium
- Valvetrain: DOHC, 16V
- Compression ratio: 10.0:1

Combustion
- Fuel system: Fuel injection
- Fuel type: Petrol

Chronology
- Predecessor: BMW M40
- Successor: BMW M44

The BMW M42 is a dual overhead camshaft sixteen valve straight-four petrol engine which was produced from 1989 to 1996. It's BMW's first mass-production DOHC engine and was produced alongside the BMW M40 and later M43 SOHC four-cylinder engine as a higher power engine model.

Compared with the M40, the M42 features a DOHC valvetrain, a timing chain, hydraulic valve lifters and an increased 10.0:1 compression ratio. Later versions of the M42 also feature a dual length intake manifold ("DISA").

The M42 was used as the basis for the S42 racing engine, which powered the BMW 320i in the German Super Tourenwagen Cup.

The M42 was replaced by the BMW M44 from its introduction in 1996.

== Design ==
Following BMW's typical construction techniques at the time, the motor incorporates a cast-iron block and aluminium head. Weight-saving measures include aluminium chain cases, oil sump, motor mount arms, accessory mounts and a cartridge-style oil filter housing. Other features included a forged steel crankshaft and tubular stainless steel exhaust manifold instead of the more typical cast-iron items. BMW also fitted hydraulic motor mounts to decrease the inline four's inherent noise, vibration, and harshness compared to the smoother straight-six engines in production at that time.

When installed in the BMW E30, a two-piece oil pan with a removable front sump was fitted to the M42. In this two-piece arrangement, the upper oil pan casting incorporates the oil pump's supply passage, and is sealed to the crankcase oil filter housing with a paper gasket. This can cause problems, because thermal cycles and engine vibration tend to loosen the upper pan mounting bolts inside the motor.

All versions featured a low-maintenance timing chain with a self-adjusting hydraulic chain tensioner and hydraulic valve tappets. From September 1993, the chain idler gear was replaced by a more reliable curved plastic guide, requiring a new design of front engine/chain casing. The M42 uses the Bosch Motronic M1.7 engine management system, eliminating a distributor in favor of fully electronic ignition timing. Unlike the M50 engine, the M42 ignition system does not use a coil-on-plug system, relying instead on a separate coil pack and plug leads. In markets that required emissions controls, the DME also incorporates an oxygen sensor and three-way catalytic converter.

From September 1993 - at the same time as the spring loaded Multi V auxiliary drive belt was introduced - the potentially troublesome timing chain idler gear was replaced by a curved chain guide rail that required a redesigned front timing case.

From January 1995, the M42 (and all other BMW engines) received the EWS-II engine immobiliser with a revised ECU, a transponder chip in the ignition key, a plastic ring around the ignition lock (introduced with a new steering lock December 1994 in preparation) and an EWS transponder unit behind the glovebox.

In the final versions of the M42, BMW engineered a dual length intake manifold (called "DISA" by BMW)

== Versions ==
Engine	Displacement	Power	Torque	Year
M42B18	1,796 cc (109.6 cu in)	100 kW (136 PS; 134 hp) at 6,000 rpm	172 N⋅m (127 lb⋅ft) at 4,600 rpm	1989-1992 (E30)
M42B18	1,796 cc (109.6 cu in)	103 kW (140 PS; 138 hp) at 6,000 rpm	175 N⋅m (129 lb⋅ft) at 4,500 rpm	1992-1996 (E36)

=== M42B18 ===
The M42B18 has a displacement of 1,796 cc (109.6 cu in), which is achieved through a bore of 84 mm (3.3 in) and a stroke of 81 mm (3.2 in). Versions equipped with a catalytic converter produce 100 kW (136 PS; 134 bhp) and 172 N⋅m (127 lb⋅ft). and meet the Euro 2 emissions standard.

Applications:

- 1989–1991 E30 318is
- 1990–1992 E30 318i (only North American models)
- 1992–1995 E36 318i (only North American and South African models)
- 1991–1995 E36 318is
- 1994–1995 E36 318ti

=== S42B20 ===
The racing version of the M42 engine is called the S42 and was used in BMW's 320 4-door touring car, participating in the German Super Tourenwagen Cup. Compared with the M42, the S42 has individual throttle bodies, the displacement increased to 1,999 cc (122.0 cu in), two fuel injectors per cylinder, an increased compression ratio and a different cylinder head. The valve cover and airbox were made from carbon fiber and the lubrication system used a dry sump.

In 1994, the initial version of the S42B20 engine produced 280 PS (206 kW). Outputs gradually increased to 320 PS (235 kW) for the final version in 1997.

== Timing system revisions ==
The earliest versions of the M42 developed problems with the timing chain. The hydraulic tensioner, chain guides, idler wheel and rear lower chain case were updated to resolve wear problems experienced in the early versions of the M42. The updated cam chain tensioner is shared with that of the later M44 engine.

In September 1993, BMW redesigned the M42's timing chain guide rails, replacing the occasionally troublesome lower idler gear with a curved nylon guide rail. The idler gear's retaining bolt could break away from the timing case, often taking a chunk of alloy timing case with it.

== Recalls ==
Early models of the M42 experienced failures of a profile gasket sealing the lower cam chain case to the underside of the cylinder head. This gasket seals the primary coolant passage within the timing chain case. A significant failure would thus discharge pressurized steam and hot coolant into the timing chain case. In many cases this coolant rapidly contaminates the motor oil in the sump, causing main bearing failure. BMW updated the profile gasket material and instituted a program to repair motors under warranty. In extreme cases, the aluminum mating surfaces in the head and chain case would corrode.

== See also ==
- BMW
- List of BMW engines
