= Duesen Bayern =

Japanese automobile company

- Industry: Automotive
- Founded: 2001
- Founder: Tetsuya Nagayama
- Headquarters: Nagoya, Aichi, Japan
- Key people: Kenji Takehora (responsible for public relations); Kudo Takuya (chief designer)

Duesen Bayern (Japanese デュッセン バイエルン, Dyussen Baierun) is a Japanese automobile brand and manufacturer located in Nagoya and founded in 2001 by Tetsuya Nagayama. Designs are in the retro style and are based on modern automobiles of other brands. Since the late 2009 the company is also manufacturing replicas of the BMW Isetta 250, the Chevrolet Corvette C1, the Ferrari 288 GTO, the Nissan Skyline 2000 GT-R and the Toyota 2000GT. These vehicles are exported to Europe in limited numbers.

== Model History ==
=== Duesen Bayern Mystar ===
- Japanese spelling: デュッセン バイエルン マイスター

The Mystar (translated: Master) was introduced in February 2002 and was the company's first car model. The exterior of the Mystar resembles that of the Mercedes-Benz 190 SL, and its interior is taken from the BMW Z3. At the first glance, the Mystar cannot be distinguished from the original, if not for its different bodywork dimensions, hence not considered under European law to be a copy. The bodywork of the Mystar is made out of fiberglass. The hood can be opened completely. The car is available with four- and six-cylinder engines which offers 140 to 231 hp, and in left- or right-hand drive.

=== Duesen Bayern Ritz ===
- Japanese spelling: デュッセン バイエルン リッツ

Technically based on the Nissan March, the Ritz resembles the old Fiat Nuova 500, but it has a bigger engine compartment. The small car is offered since June 2002 and it is available for approximately 1,500,000 ¥ in Japan and €15,500 /£13,000 in Europe. In Japan there is a small network of dealers for Duesen Bayern vehicles.

=== Duesen Bayern Agnes ===
- Japanese spelling: デュッセン バイエルン アグネス

The Agnes is a sportier version of the Mystar. The new model was introduced in May 2007. The interior and the engines are the same as in the Mystar.

== Model overview ==
model name	Mystar	Agnes	Ritz
engines	BMW engines with four or six cylinders. 1.9L (M43B19); 2.0L (M50B20); 2.2L (M54B22); 2.8L (M52B28); 3.0L (M54B30)		Nissan engines with four cylinders. 1.2L (CR12DE); 1.4L (CR14DE)
hand-drive	right or left		right
emission standard	Euro III		
horsepower	140–231		90–98
gearbox	Automatic 4- or 5-speed, five-speed manual transmission alternatively		Manual or automatic depending on availability (see Nissan March)
seats	2		5
length (mm)	4370	4250	3925
width (mm)	1780		1660
height (mm)	1280		1525

- all details are factory specifications (taken from website on August 12, 2019)
