= ZF S5-31 transmission =

5-speed manual transmission

The ZF S5-31 transmission is a five-speed manual transmission by ZF Friedrichshafen. The transmission is designed for use in longitudinal engine applications. The transmission is rated for 310 Nm (229 lbf ·ft) of torque. The transmission weighs ~39 kg (86 lb), and holds 1.3 litres of transmission fluid.

Using different bell housings, the transmission was fitted to many different BMW engines.

Gear ratios
| 1 | 2 | 3 | 4 | 5 | R |
| 4.21 | 2.49 | 1.67 | 1.24 | 1.0 | 3.85 |

== Designation by BMW ==
The ZF S5-31 transmission is referred to as "S5D 310Z" by BMW. The transmissions made from September 1995, were made with a reinforced design and are named "S5D 320Z", and is rated for 320 Nm.

breakdown of the old BMW transmission designation

S5D 310Z
| S | Transmission type | S = Manual transmission A = Automatic transmission |
| 5 | Number of forward gears | |
| D | Type of top gear | D = Direct gear S = Overdrive gear |
| 310 | Max. input torque (Nm) | |
| Z | Code letter of manufacturer | Z = ZF G = Getrag R = GM |

== Applications ==
- 1995–1999 E36 328i
- 1992–1999 E36 M3
- 1999-2000 E46 328i
- 1999-2000 E46 328ci
- 2001–2006 E46 325xi
- 2001–2006 E46 330i
- 1990–1992 E34 525i (M50)
- 1992–1995 E34 530i (M60)
- 2001–2003 E39 525i (M54)
- 1996–2000 E39 528i (M52)
- 2001–2003 E39 530i (M54)
- 1996–2003 E39 535i (M62)
- 1994–1996 E38 730i (M60)
- 1992–1994 E32 730i (M60)
- 1995–2001 E38 735i (M62)
- 2000–2006 E53 X5 3.0i (M54)
- 1996–2000 Z3 2.8i (M52)
- 1996–2000 Z3 3.0i (M54)
- 1996–2000 Z3 M3.2i (S52) *Canada & USA only
- 2001–2002 Z3 M3.2i (S54)

== See also ==
- List of ZF transmissions
