= Z3 =

Z3 may refer to:

== Mobile phones ==
- BlackBerry Z3, a smartphone
- Moto Z3, a smartphone
- Motorola Rizr Z3, a slide mobile phone
- Samsung Z3, a smartphone
- Sony Xperia Z3, a smartphone

== Computing ==
- Z3 (computer), the world's first working programmable, fully automatic digital computer created by Konrad J Zuse
- Z3 Theorem Prover, a satisfiability modulo theories solver by Microsoft
- .Z3, a file extension for story files for the Infocom Z-machine

== Vehicles ==
- BMW Z3, a BMW sports car model
- German destroyer Z3 Max Schultz, a Nazi Germany destroyer
- Z-3, American Blimp MZ-3 of the U.S. Navy
- Z3-class, the third variant of the Z-class Melbourne tram

== Other uses ==
- Zenon: Z3, a television series
- Z_{3}, in mathematics, the cyclic group of order 3
- Zombies 3, a 2022 Disney Channel television film
- Z3Cubing, a speedcubing YouTuber

== See also ==
- 3Z (disambiguation)
- ZE (disambiguation)
