= Ze =

Z.E. or Ze can refer to:

== Arts and mythology ==
- Ze (manga), a comic series (2004–2011)
- ZE Records, an American label (1978–1984)
- Bai Ze, a beast of Chinese legend
- Zé Povinho, a Portuguese everyman
- Zé Pilintra, of Afro-Brazilian folklore

== Language ==
- Ze (Cyrillic), a letter of the Cyrillic alphabet
  - Reversed Ze, a rarer Cyrillic letter
- Ze (cuneiform), a sign in the cuneiform syllabery
- Ze (pronoun), in Modern English
- Źe, in the Pashto alphabet
- Že, in the Perso-Arabic alphabet

== People ==
=== With the stage name ===
- Z.E (born 1994), a Swedish rapper

=== With the given name ===
- Zhang Ze, a Chinese male tennis player
- Ze Frank (born 1972), a performance artist
- Zé (given name), a Portuguese form of the name José, shared by several notable people

=== With the surname ===
- Tom Zé (born 1936), a Brazilian musician
- Ze Rong (died 195), a Han general and Buddhist leader

== Places ==
- Zè, Benin
- ZE postcode area, covering the Shetland Islands, Scotland

== Science ==
- Charge number of an electron ("ze")

== Transport and vehicles ==
- Renault Z.E., an electric car
  - Renault Fluence Z.E.
- Zero emission, of an engine or motor
- Indian steam locomotive class ZE
- Eastar Jet, a South Korean airline (IATA:ZE)
