= 3Z =

3Z or 3-Z may refer to:

- Smartwings Poland (IATA code), formerly Travel Service Polska
- American Blimp MZ-3 or MA-3Z

== See also ==
- Z3 (disambiguation)
