= BMW Z3 =

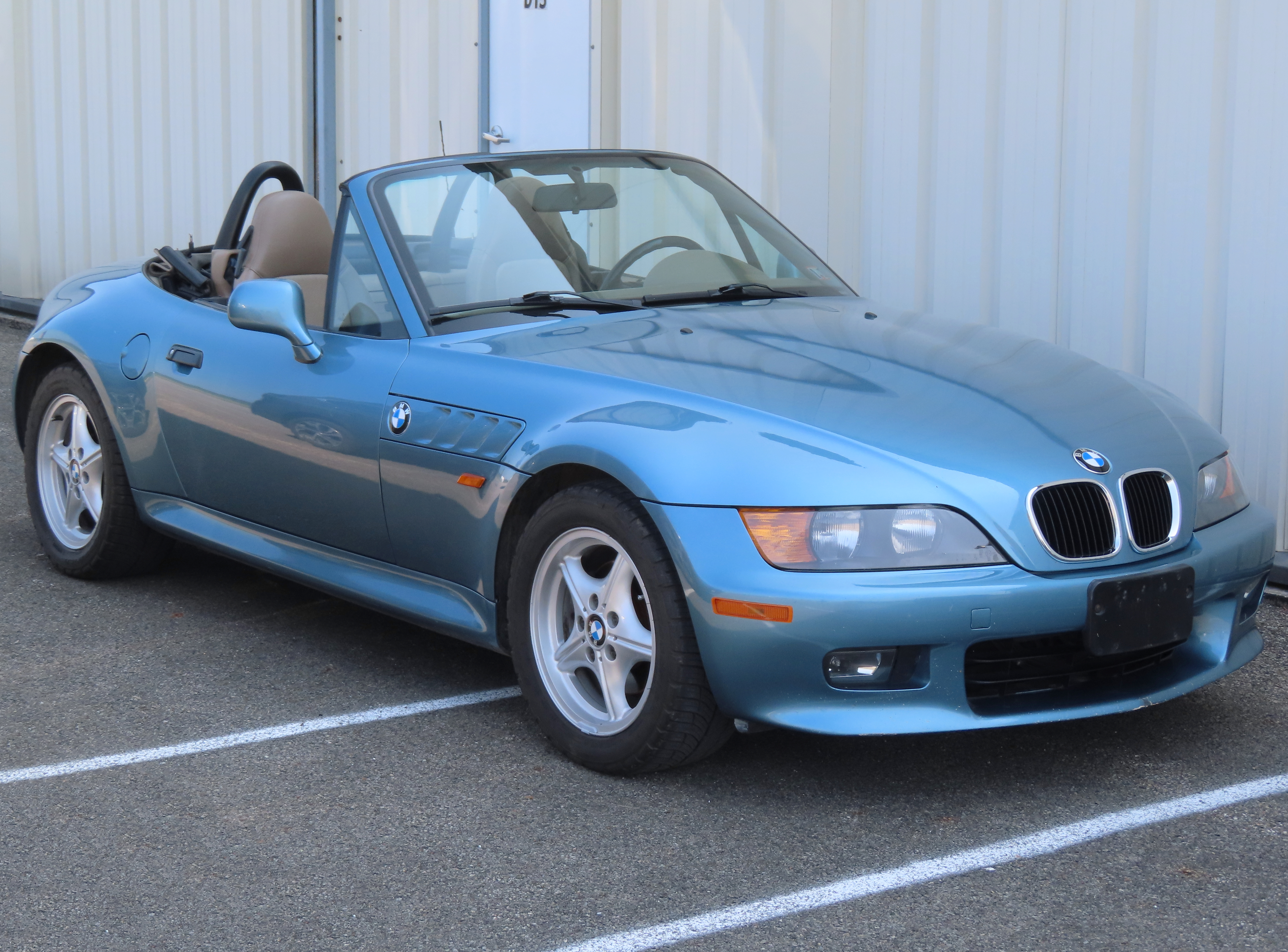

Overview
- Manufacturer: BMW
- Model code: E36/7 (roadster); E36/8 (coupe)
- Production: September 1995 – June 2002
- Model years: 1996–2002
- Assembly: United States: Greer, South Carolina (Plant Spartanburg)
- Designer: Joji Nagashima; Burkhard Göschel

Body and chassis
- Class: Sports car (S)
- Body style: 2-door roadster; 3-door shooting-brake
- Layout: Front-engine, rear-wheel drive
- Related: BMW 3 Series (E36)

Powertrain
- Engine: Gasoline: 1.8–1.9 L M43/M44 I4; 2.0–3.0 L M52/M52TÜ/M54 I6; 3.2 L S50/S52/S54 I6
- Transmission: 5-speed GETRAG 250/ZF S5-31 manual; 4-speed GM Hydra-matic 4L30E automatic; 5-speed GM 5L40-E/ZF 5HP automatic

Dimensions
- Wheelbase: 2,446 mm (96.3 in)
- Length: 4,025 mm (158.5 in)
- Width: 1,692 mm (66.6 in)
- Height: 1,293–1,306 mm (50.9–51.4 in)
- Curb weight: 1,160–1,400 kg (2,557–3,086 lb)

Chronology
- Predecessor: BMW Z1
- Successor: BMW Z4 (E85)

The BMW Z3 is a range of two-seater sports cars which was produced from 1995 to 2002. The body styles of the range are:

- 2-door roadster (E36/7 model code)
- 2-door coupé (E36/8 model code)

The Z3 was based on the E36/5 compact platform, a shortened version of the conventional E36 platform. This smaller and cheaper platform used the rear semi-trailing arm suspension design from the older E30 3 Series. It is the first mass-produced Z Series car.

M models were introduced in 1998 in roadster and coupé body styles and were powered by the S50, S52, or S54 straight-six engine depending on country and model year. The M models came with a 5-speed manual transmission. The regular Z3s were offered with straight-sixes or four-cylinder engines.

Production ended on June 28, 2002, with the Z3 line replaced by the E85 Z4.

== Development and launch ==
Development on the roadster began in 1991 and was led by Burkhard Göschel. The exterior was designed by Joji Nagashima, being completed in mid-1992 at 39 months before production and the design was frozen in 1993. Design patents were filed on April 2, 1994, in Germany and on September 27, 1994, in the US. The Z3 was introduced via video press release by BMW North America on June 12, 1995. Production began on September 20, 1995.

Development on the coupé model was run by a group of BMW engineers outside of work in their own time. The Z3 Coupé shares the identical platform and parts with the roadster, but features a chassis-stiffening hatch area and is 2.7 times stiffer in comparison. The Z3 Coupé was unveiled at the 1997 Frankfurt Motor Show.

The Z3 was the first BMW model to be solely manufactured outside of Germany. It was manufactured in Greer, South Carolina.

== Body styles ==
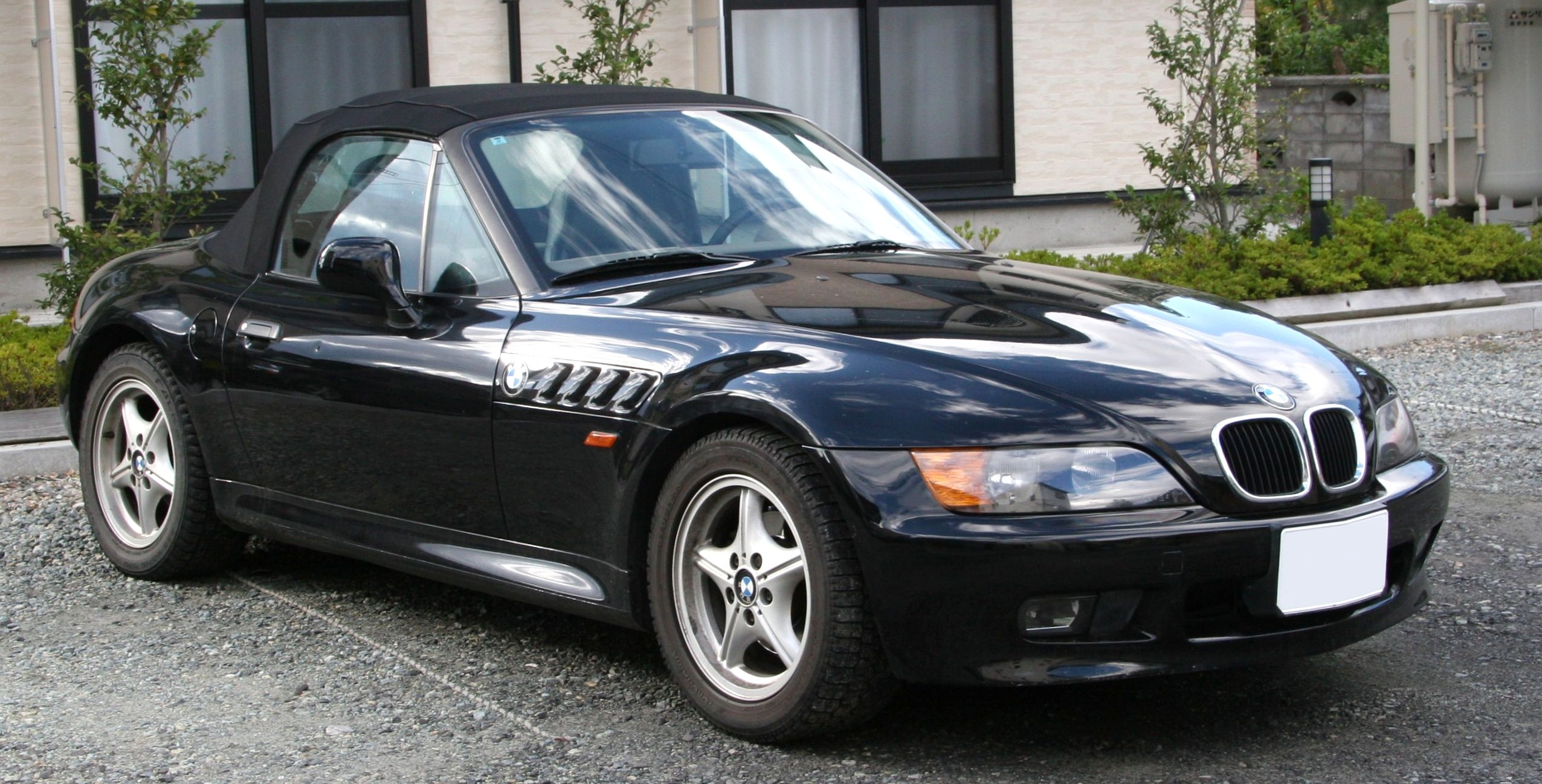
E36/7 roadster (pre-facelift)

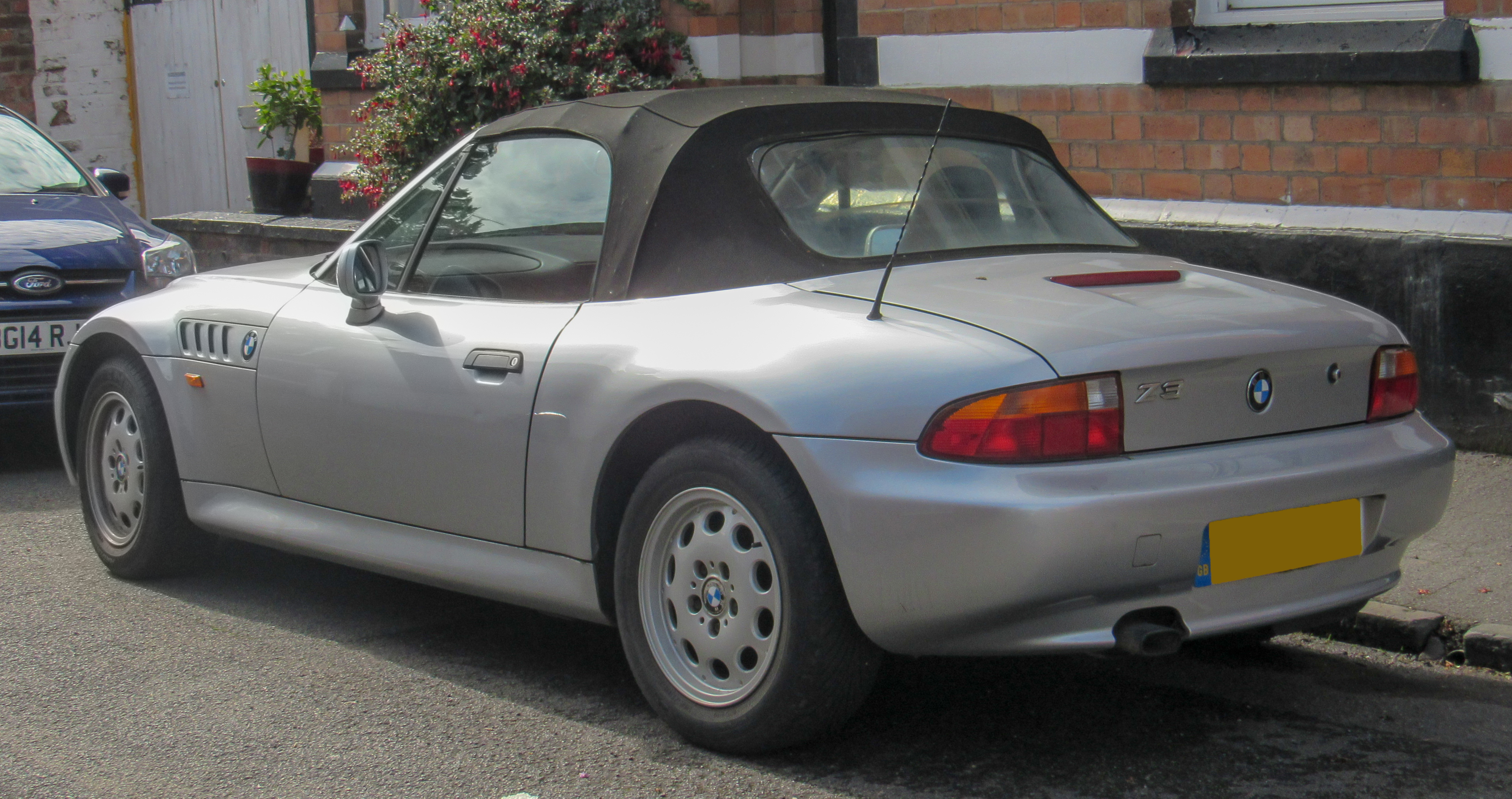
E36/7 roadster (pre-facelift)

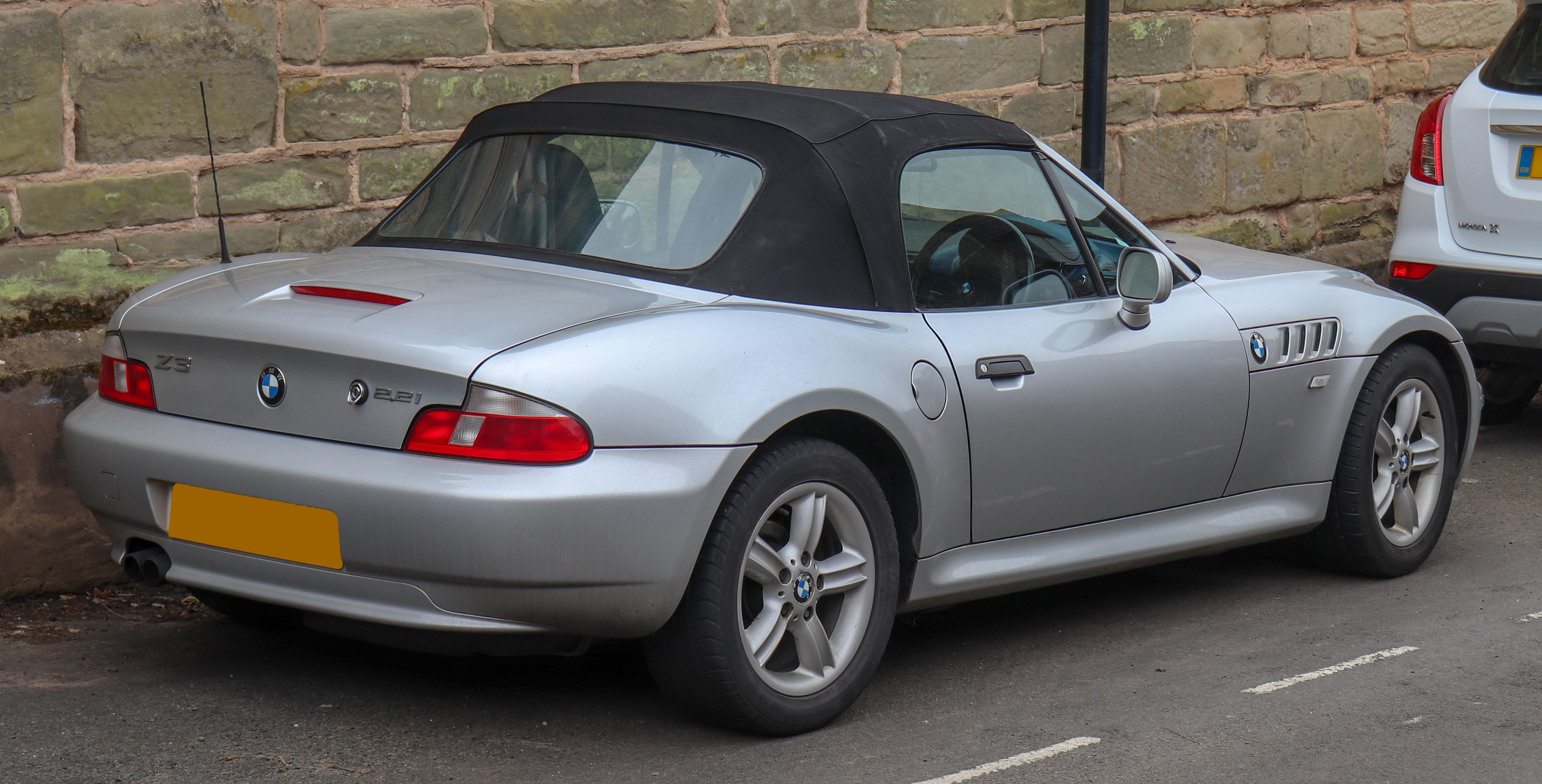
E36/7 roadster (facelift)

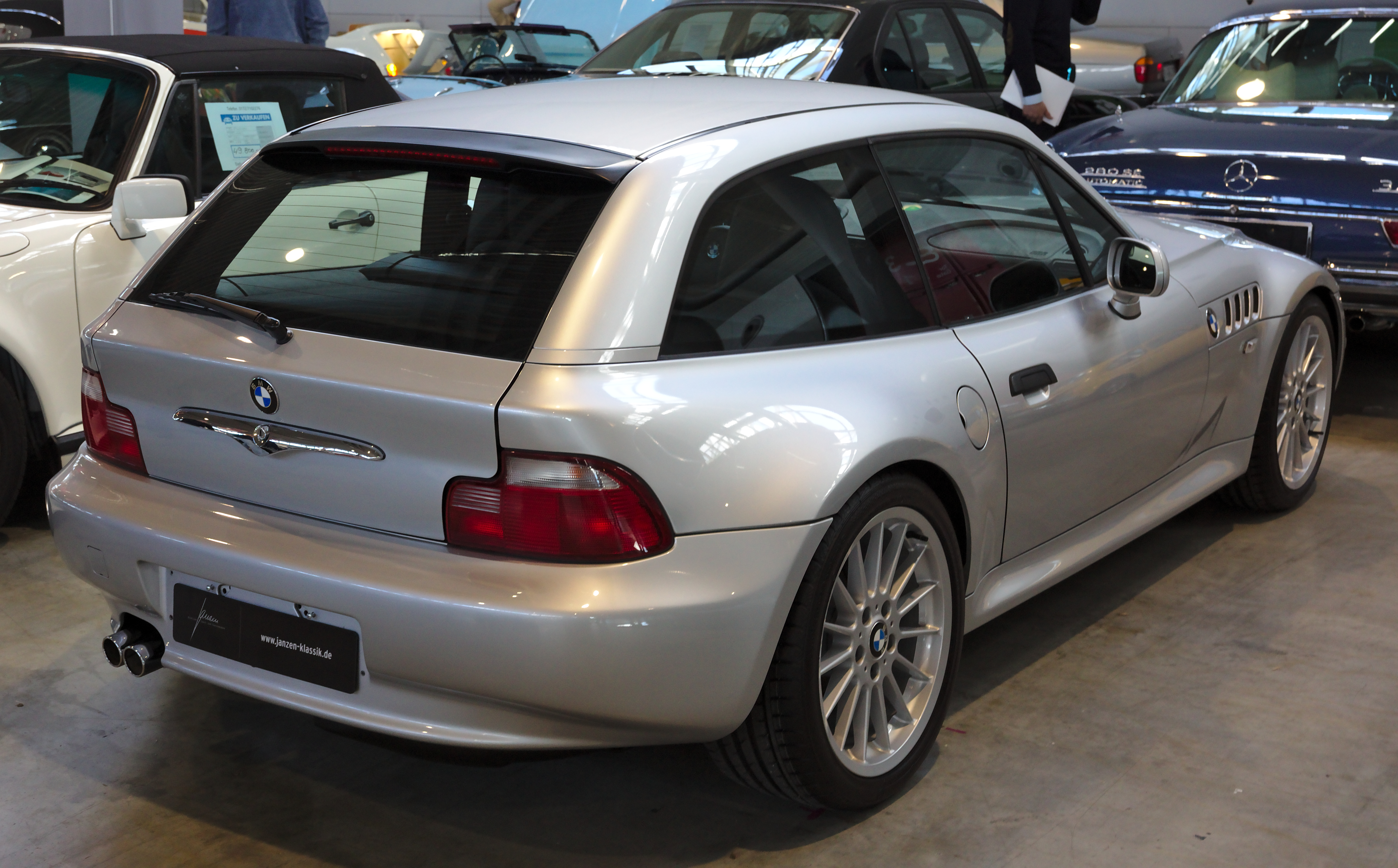
E36/8 coupé

=== Roadster (E36/7) ===
2001 Z3 3.0i interior

Roadster models entered production in September 1995, powered by 4-cylinder engines on launch. 6-cylinder engines were later introduced in 1996. A removable hardtop roof was available as an optional accessory.

=== Coupé (E36/8) ===
Coupé models entered production in January 1998 and could be ordered from spring that year. Deliveries, however, only started in September 1998. The unusual side profile has been given nicknames such as "clown shoe" and "bread van" by critics. In Germany, it has been referred to as a "turnschuh" (sports shoe).

The coupé body style was only available with the engines that matched the 2.8, 3.0i, and M model Roadsters. The engine outputs varied as they spanned four generations of engine architecture, peaking at 325 horsepower with the facelift M Coupé. Like the roadster models, it was rear-wheel drive only, and was available in either an automatic or manual transmission. Very few of these cars were made, making it rarer than most cars, the BMW M Coupe model especially so.

== Transmissions ==
The available transmissions are:

- 5-speed ZF S5-31 manual (Z3 2.8 / 3.0i / Z3M)
- 5-speed Getrag 250 manual (Z3 1.8 / 1.9i / 2.0 / 2.2i / 2.3/ 2.5)
- 4-speed GM 4L30-E automatic (Z3 1.9 / 2.0 / 2.5 / 2.8)
- 5-speed GM 5L40-E automatic (Z3 2.2i / 2.5 / 3.0i)

== Models ==
The 4-cylinder models feature a single tailpipe, while six-cylinder models have dual tailpipes, wider rear fenders (for pre-facelift models) and a revised front bumper. M models featured the same wider fenders as the six-cylinder models but with unique front and rear bumpers, side mirrors and the M division's first use of a quad exhaust pipe arrangement.

The 1.8, 2.0, and 2.2i models were unavailable in the United States. The U.S. was also the only market to receive the 2.3 and 2.5 models

Model	Years	Engine	Power	Torque
1.8	1995–1998	M43B18 inline-four	85 kW (116 PS; 114 hp) at 5,500 rpm	168 N⋅m (124 lb⋅ft) at 3,900 rpm
1.8	1999–2000	M43B19 inline-four	87 kW (118 PS; 117 hp) at 5,500 rpm	180 N⋅m (133 lb⋅ft) at 3,900 rpm
1.9	1995–1999	M44B19 inline-four	103 kW (140 PS; 138 hp) at 6,000 rpm	180 N⋅m (133 lb⋅ft) at 4,300 rpm
1.9i	2000–2002	M43B19 inline-four	87 kW (118 PS; 117 hp) at 5,500 rpm	180 N⋅m (133 lb⋅ft) at 3,900 rpm
2.0	1999–2000	M52TÜB20 inline-six	110 kW (150 PS; 148 hp) at 5,900 rpm	190 N⋅m (140 lb⋅ft) at 3,500 rpm
2.2i	2000–2002	M54B22 inline-six	125 kW (170 PS; 168 hp) at 6,100 rpm	210 N⋅m (155 lb⋅ft) at 3,500 rpm
2.3	1998–2000	M52TÜB25 inline-six	127 kW (173 PS; 170 hp) at 5,500 rpm	245 N⋅m (181 lb⋅ft) at 3,500 rpm
2.5i	2000–2002	M54B25 inline-six	137 kW (186 PS; 184 hp) at 6,000 rpm	237 N⋅m (175 lb⋅ft) at 3,500 rpm
2.8	1997–1998	M52B28 inline-six	141 kW (192 PS; 189 hp) at 5,300 rpm	275 N⋅m (203 lb⋅ft) at 3,950 rpm
2.8	1999–2000	M52TÜB28 inline-six	142 kW (193 PS; 190 hp) at 5,300 rpm	280 N⋅m (207 lb⋅ft) at 3,500 rpm
3.0i	2000–2002	M54B30 inline-six	170 kW (231 PS; 228 hp) at 5,900 rpm	300 N⋅m (221 lb⋅ft) at 3,500 rpm
Z3M (EU)	1997–2000	S50B32 inline-six	236 kW (321 PS; 316 hp) at 7,400 rpm	350 N⋅m (258 lb⋅ft) at 3,250 rpm
Z3M (EU)	2001–2002	S54B32 inline-six	239 kW (325 PS; 321 hp) at 7,400 rpm	350 N⋅m (258 lb⋅ft) at 4,900 rpm
Z3M (US)	1997–2000	S52B32 inline-six	179 kW (243 PS; 240 hp) at 6,000 rpm	305 N⋅m (225 lb⋅ft) at 4,250 rpm
Z3M (US)	2001–2002	S54B32 inline-six	235 kW (320 PS; 315 hp) at 7,400 rpm	340 N⋅m (251 lb⋅ft) at 4,900 rpm

== M models ==
The M versions were introduced in 1997 in the roadster (M Roadster) and coupé (M Coupé) body styles. European models were initially powered by the S50 inline-six engine, while North American models were powered by the less powerful S52 inline-six engine. In 2001 both the European and North American models switched to the new S54 engine. The Z3M was only available with a 5-speed manual transmission.

Compared to the standard Z3, M models featured a limited slip differential, a wider rear track, and larger brakes (that are shared with the E36 M3). M models were available in M-specific colors and featured numerous aesthetic and aerodynamic differences versus the rest of the Z3 range, including more aerodynamic side-view mirrors, redesigned front and rear bumpers, bespoke "Roadstar" Style 40 wheels, revised side gills, and quad exhaust pipes. The interior can also be differentiated by the voltmeter, clock, and oil temperature gauges in the center console as well as unique M-styled seats and interior color options.

Unlike the rest of the Z3 range, the M Roadster and the M Coupé did not receive cosmetic changes during the facelift in 2000.

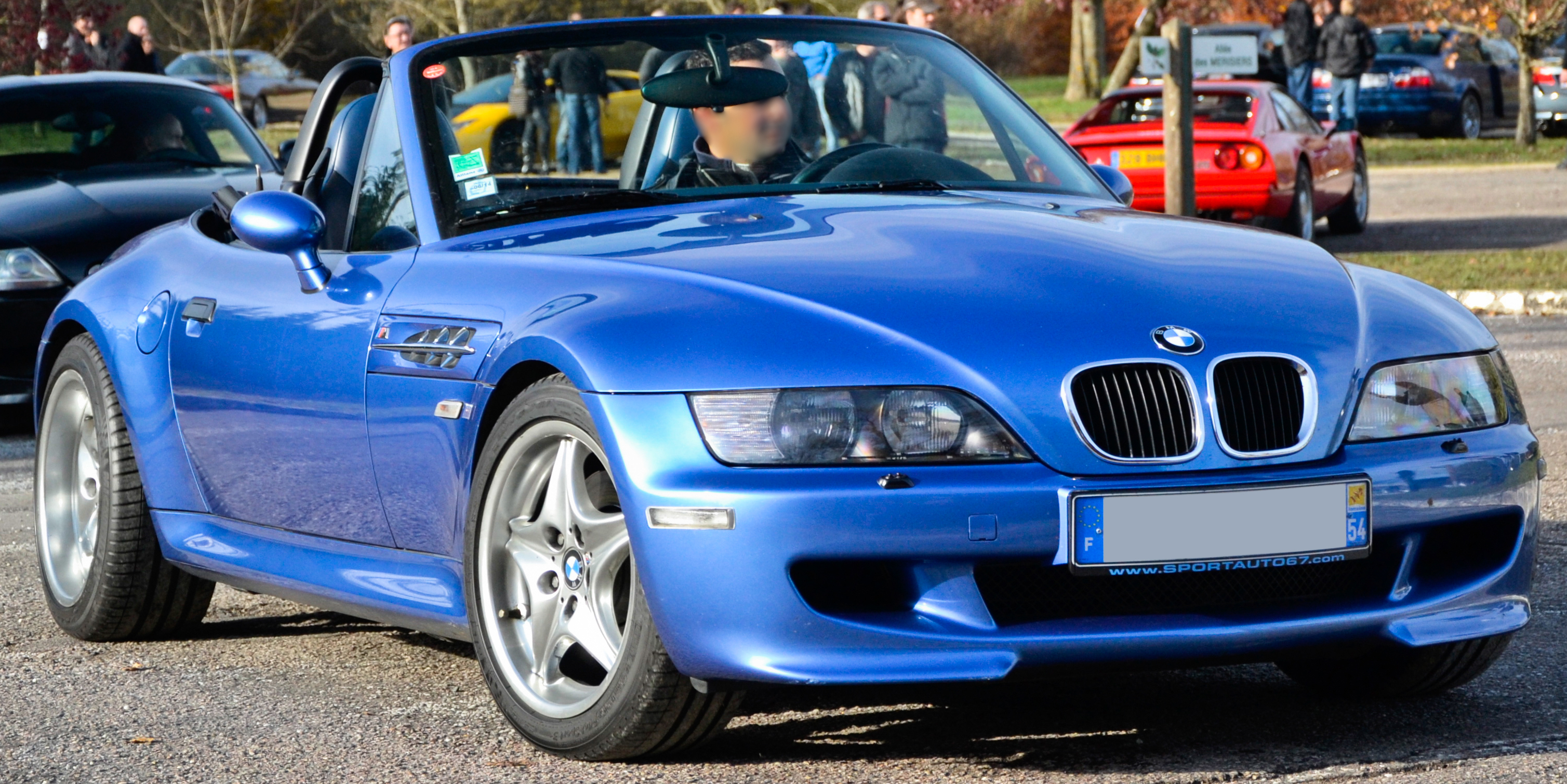
M Roadster front

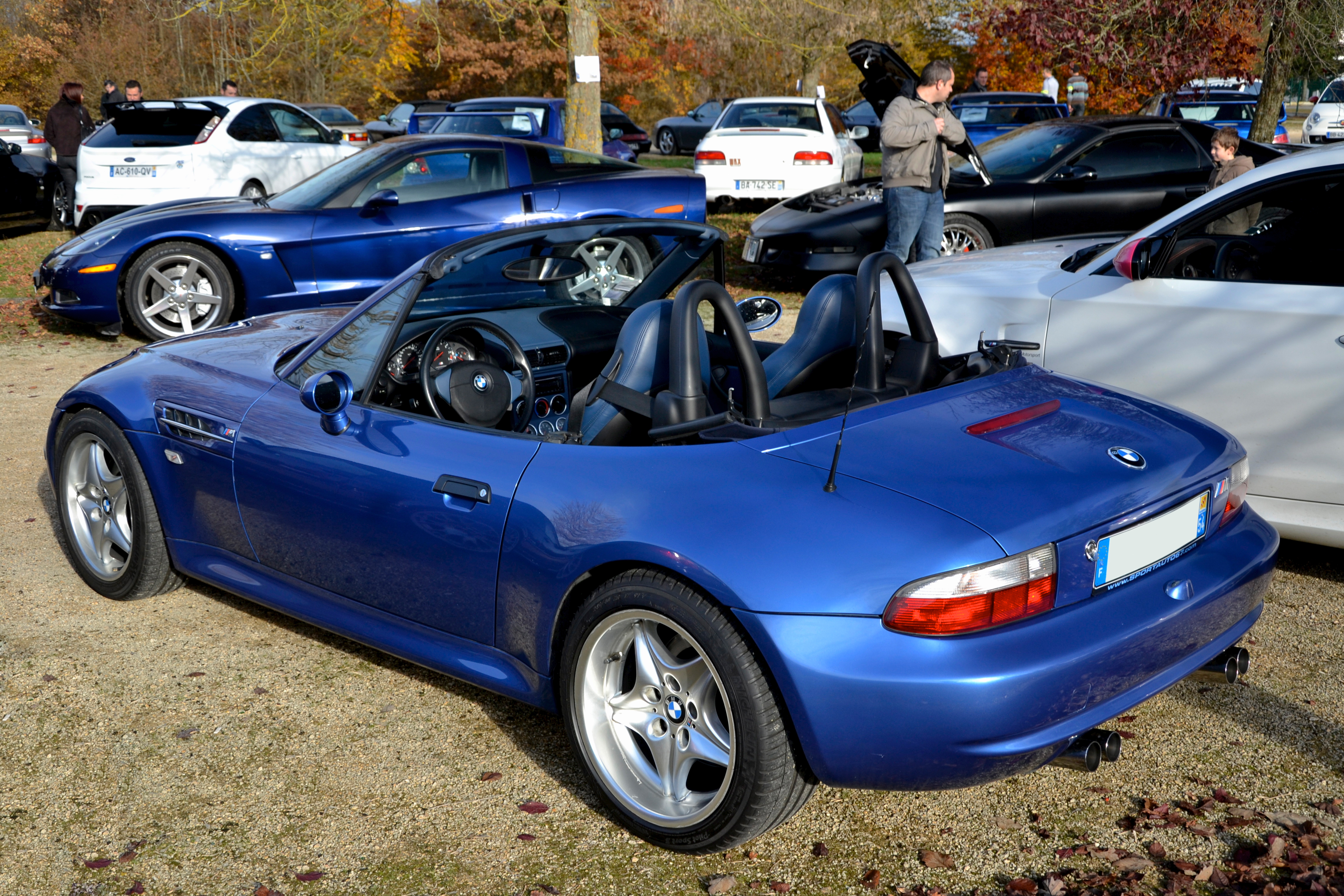
M Roadster rear

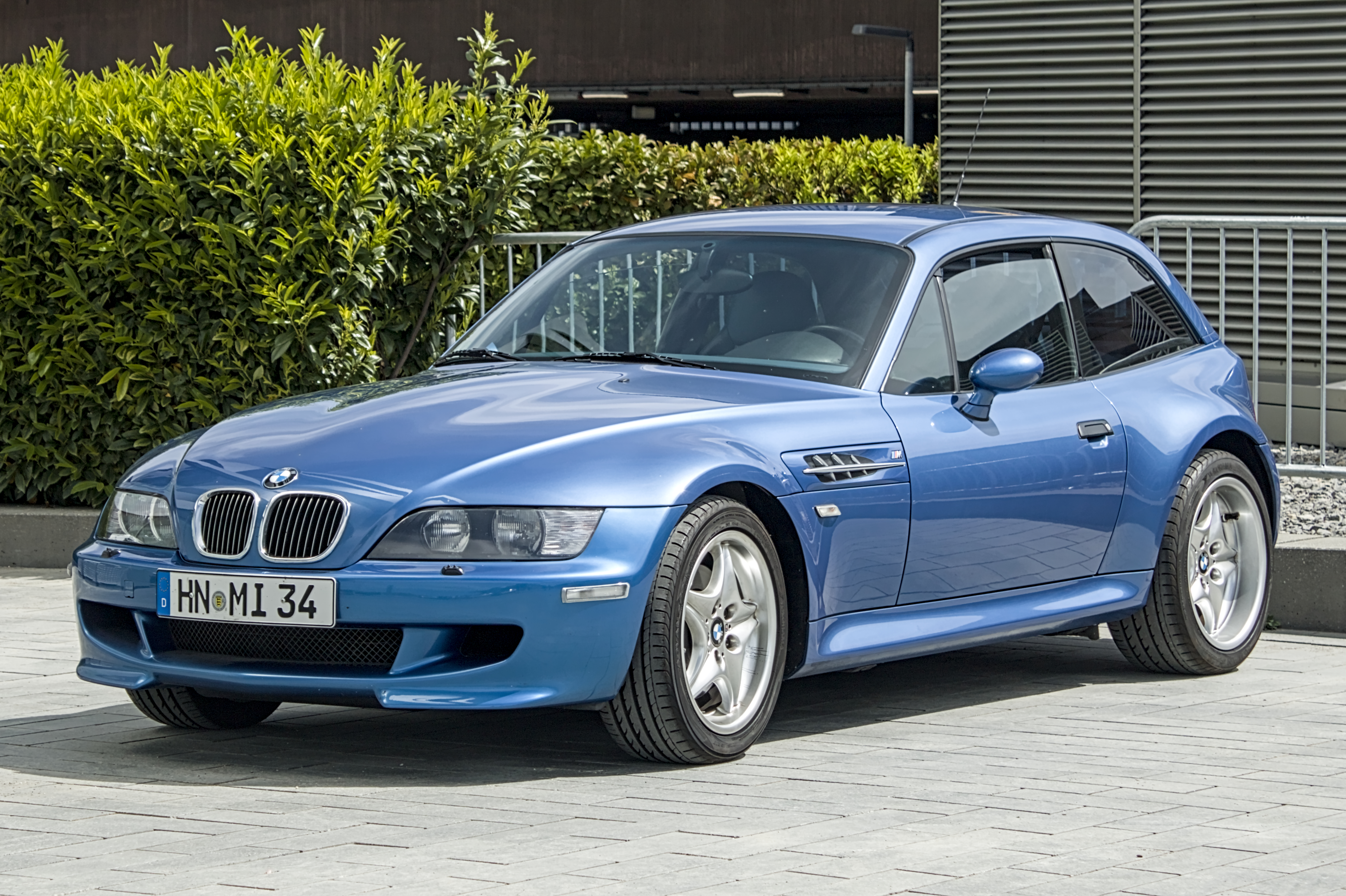
M Coupé front

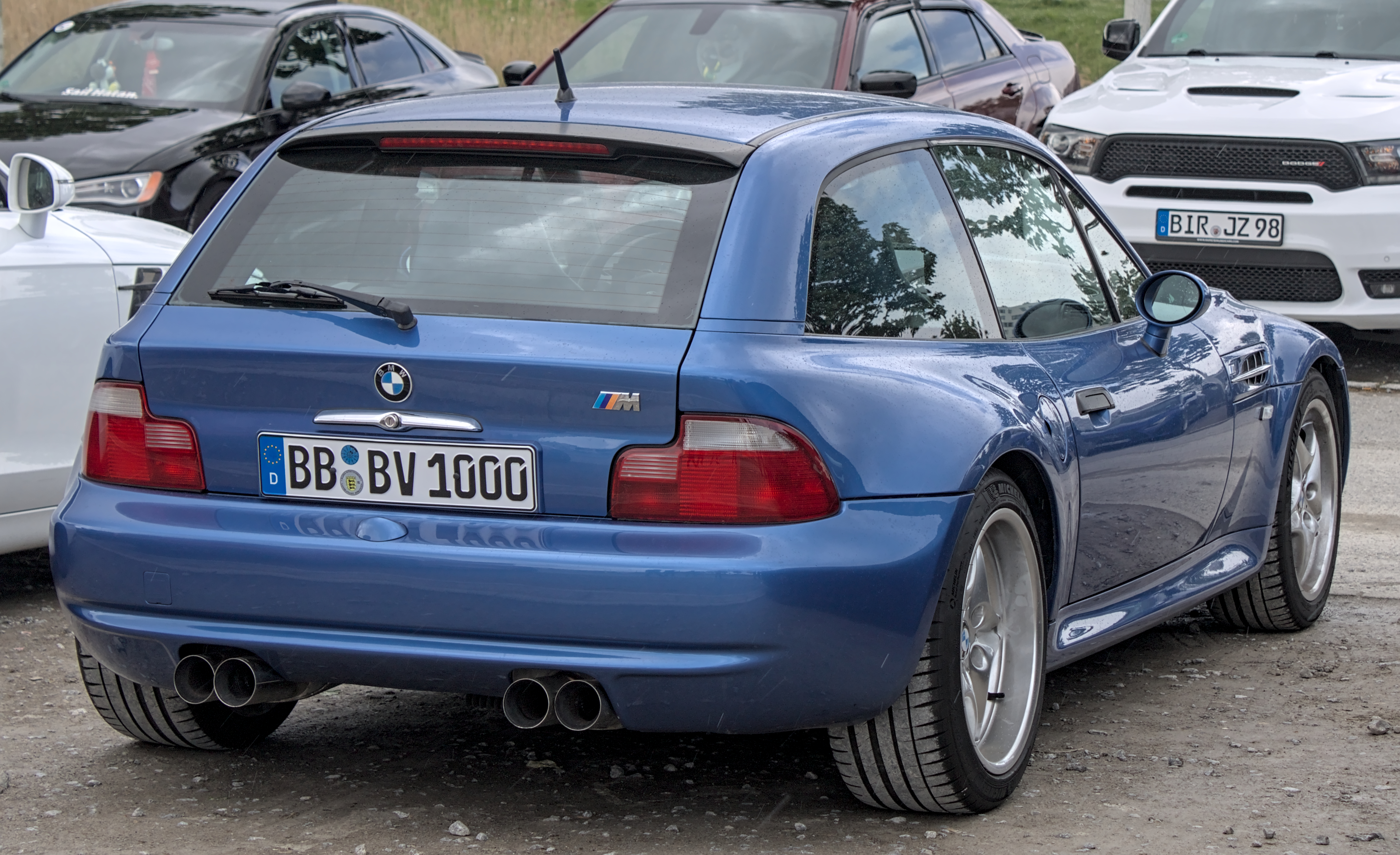
M Coupé rear

== Special models ==
=== James Bond Edition ===
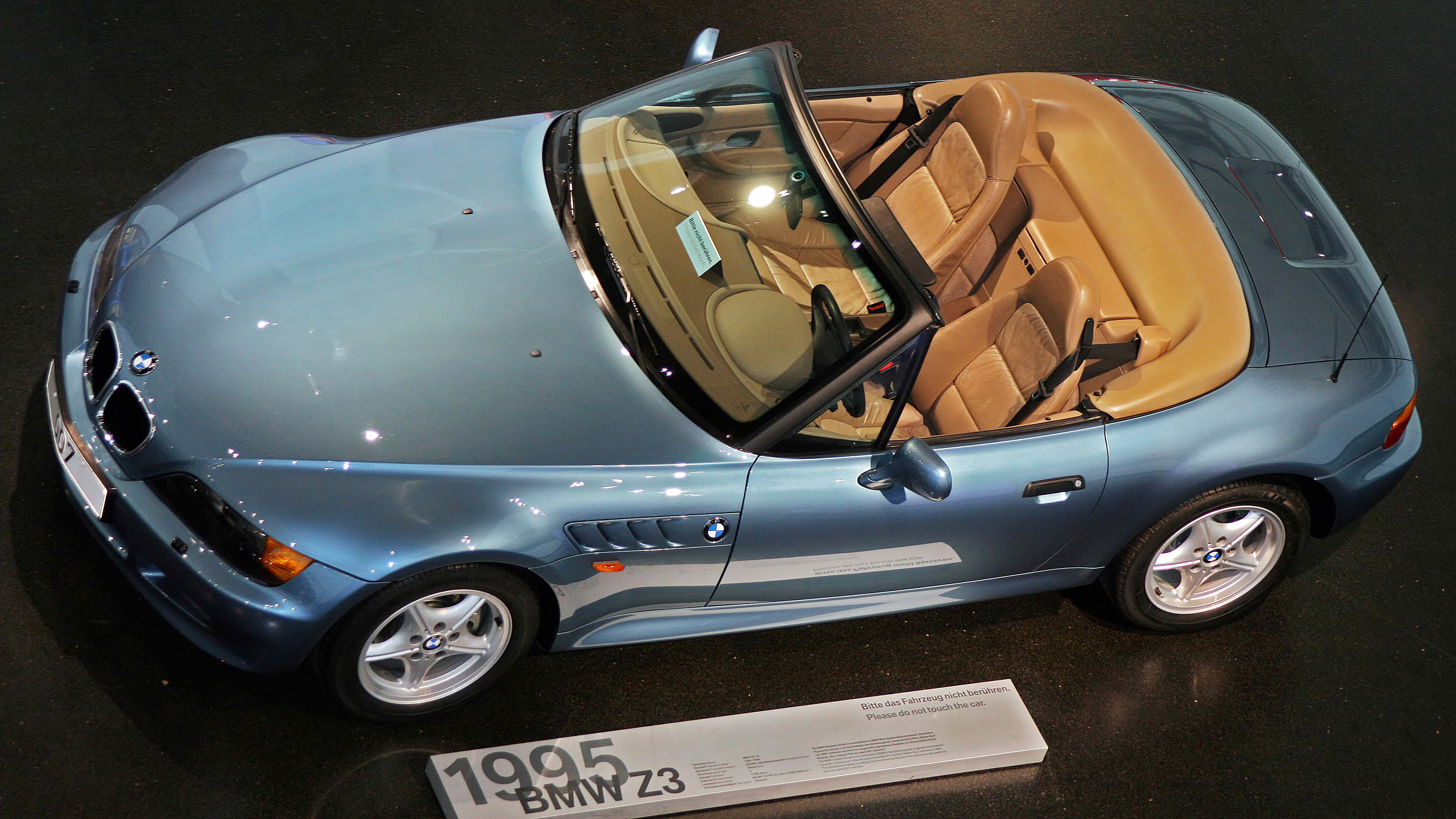
Z3 as featured in GoldenEye

To tie in with its appearance in GoldenEye, a James Bond film which was released the same year, BMW released a "James Bond Edition" Z3 that was offered for sale through the Neiman Marcus Christmas catalog. The James Bond Edition was sold in 1996 for US$35,000 (equivalent to $71,849 in 2025). BMW and Neiman Marcus had originally set a 20-unit sales goal, but this was later increased to 100 units after receiving a high level of interest from customers.

The James Bond Edition was based on the Z3 1.9i and included a 007 dash plaque, 007 floor mats, unique wheels, and chrome exterior trim. The color scheme was an "Atlanta blue" exterior with beige leather interior, matching the Z3 which appeared in GoldenEye. The VIN of all 100 limited edition cars has code 007, and the last two indicate that out of 100 produced there is a specific example (....00700 to 00799). Exactly half of the cars (50 pieces) had a manual transmission and the same number had an automatic transmission.

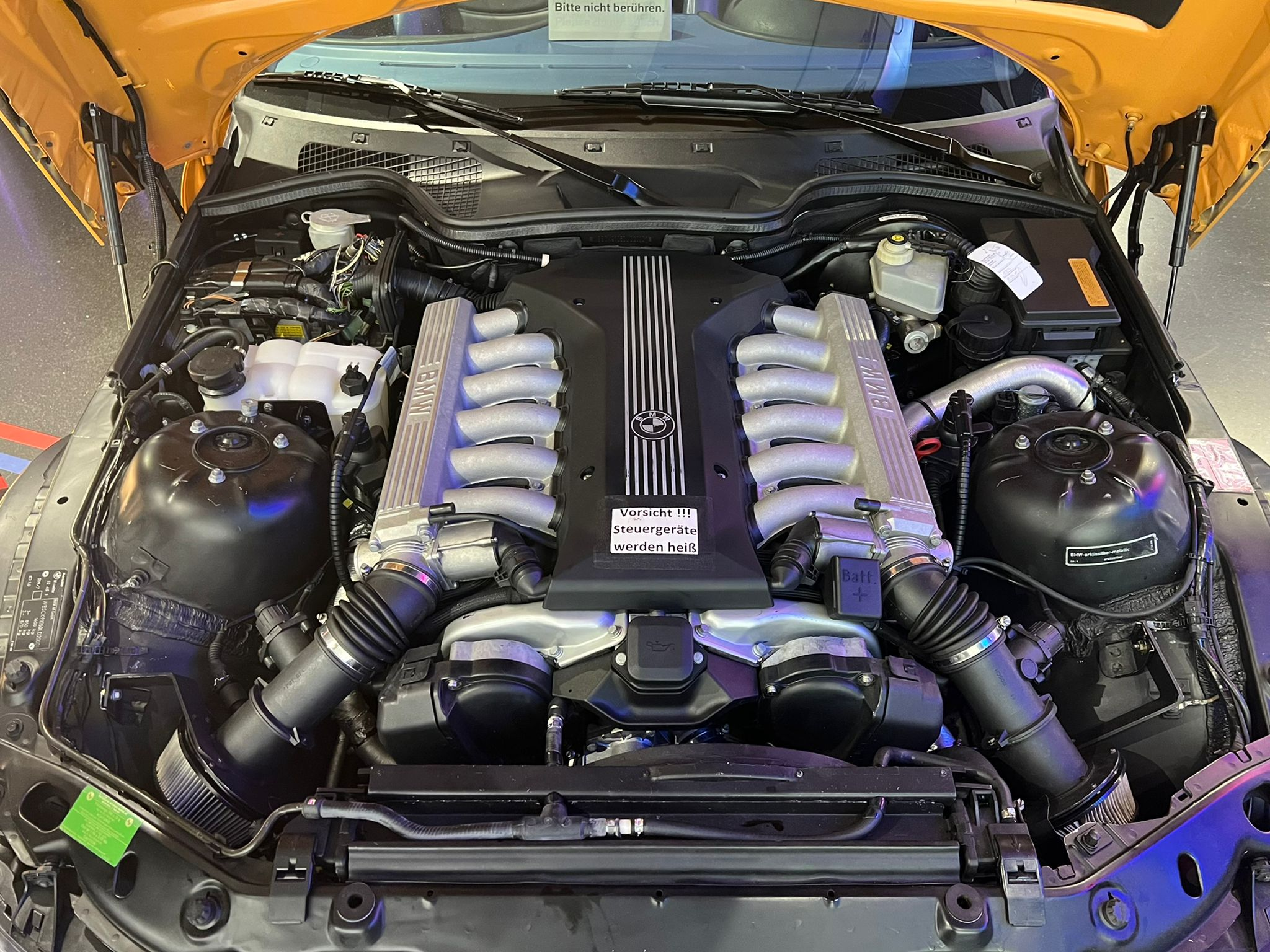
Engine of the prototype V12 Z3

=== V12 prototype ===
In 1999, the BMW M division produced a single prototype Z3 powered by the 5.4 L M73 V12 engine in order to test the space efficiency of the engine bay. It is based on the Z3 roadster, has 17 inch wheels with 225/45 tires up front and 245/40 at the rear, and is painted in a shade of orange. The V12 was rated at 240 kW (322 hp) at 5,000 rpm and 490 N⋅m (361 lb⋅ft) of torque at 3,900 rpm, and power was sent through a 6-speed manual transmission. The concept is much heavier than the standard Z3 at 1,400 kg (3,086 lb), with nearly all of that excess weight attributable to the V12—the big engine resulted in a 70/30 weight distribution front/rear. The engine itself was so heavy and tightly fitted into the engine bay that it was explicitly warned to not go over speed bumps in it. The concept was fully functional and was tested by the German motoring magazine Autozeitung in 1999. Their tests revealed a 0–100 km/h (0–62 mph) time of 5.5 seconds, a standing kilometer (0.62 miles) in 24.4 seconds, and a top speed of 263 km/h (163 mph).

=== M Coupé Safety Car ===
A safety car variant of the BMW M Coupé was produced by the BMW M division for MotoGP and used in the 2000 season.

== Model year changes ==
=== 1997 ===
- M Roadster and M Coupé models introduced to the public.
- BMW Individual introduced to Z3 models.

=== 1998 ===
- Coupé models introduced.
- Wood trim and a power soft top were added as options.
- Rollover hoops introduced.
- Automatic stability control (ASC) became standard equipment on 1.9 models.
- Hardtop shell option for Z3 models introduced.

=== 1999 facelift ===
In April 1999, the facelift (LCI) versions of the Z3 began production. Major changes include:

- 6-cylinder models (2.0i, 2.3i and 2.8i) received the M52TÜ engine; introducing dual-VANOS, a DISA valve and cooling system.
- Exterior design changes including redesigned chrome ring headlights and L-shaped taillights, wider rear track by 2.5 in (64mm) (now the same across 4 and 6-cylinder models), model designation badges, finger indent for trunk release button, integrated third brake light (with silver lights on 2.8 and 3.0i models), chrome exhaust tips, and new wheel designs. The Z3M models did not receive these exterior changes.
- Interior design changes including redesigned centre console buttons with a clock in the middle and a new three-spoke steering wheel design.
- Electronic stability control upgraded from ASC to new DSC system.
- New three-layer insulation convertible roof with headlining.
- Dual-stage side airbags introduced.

=== 2000 ===
- The Z3 2.0 model was replaced by the Z3 2.2i and the Z3 2.8 model was replaced by the Z3 3.0i, as the inline-six engines were upgraded from the M52 to the M54 (the addition of the "i" to the model names is not significant, since all engines use electronic fuel injection). In the United States, the Z3 2.3 model was replaced by the Z3 2.5.
- DSC now integrated with Dynamic Brake Control (DBC) and Automatic Differential Brake (ADB) functions.

=== 2001 ===
- Z3M models switched from the BMW S50 (Euro spec) and BMW S52 (U.S. spec) inline-six engines to the BMW S54 inline-six engine.

== Production volumes ==
One source provides the data below for production figures. However, there are other sources which provide conflicting information, so actual figures are not certain.

Model	Total	Roadster	Coupé
Z3 1.8	56,091	56,091	-
Z3 1.9i	77,965	77,965	-
Z3 2.0	14,616	14,616	-
Z3 2.2i	21,052	21,052	-
Z3 2.3	22,282	22,282	-
Z3 2.5	6,813	6,813	-
Z3 2.8	58,278	50,607	7,671
Z3 3.0i	18,378	14,525	3,853
Z3 M	21,613	15,322	6,291
Total:	297,088	279,273	17,815

== Marketing ==
The Z3 appeared briefly in the James Bond movie GoldenEye, in a scene where Bond is driving in Cuba. Bond would eventually trade the car in exchange for Jack Wade's plane. The Z3 is one of only a few non-British production cars to be driven by James Bond throughout the history of the film franchise, and the first of three James Bond films that prominently featured a BMW. This break in tradition was due to a three-film licensing deal between BMW and the James Bond franchise that began with GoldenEye and ended with The World Is Not Enough. The Z3 in GoldenEye features stinger missiles hidden behind the headlights, an emergency parachute braking system, and a radar scanner in the form of a LCD screen in the dashboard. It is also noted during the briefing scene that the car contains a passenger ejector seat and a self-destruct system, though they aren't used at any point in the film. The Z3 is also one of the few vehicles in the Q-Branch that was not destroyed in the field. Fans of the franchise were not enthused with the BMW product placement, all the more so since the Z3 never was given a scene in which to use the weaponry and defense features that have always distinguished a James Bond car. This was ultimately rectified with the BMW 750iL in the following film, Tomorrow Never Dies.

Two blue prototypes were provided in January 1995 for filming at the Leavesden Aerodrome. The agreement between BMW and Eon Productions was for cross-promotion of the car and the film, and no money changed hands.

Sales of the Z3 spiked as the film sat at number one at the box office. The entire 1996 BMW Z3 roadster production run, more than 15,000 roadsters, was sold out by the time the car was introduced.

The Z3 appeared in The Follow, one of the BMW films released in 2001.

== Awards ==
- 1995 "Super Reggie" Best-of-show award for the GoldenEye marketing campaign
- 1999 Edmunds' Most Wanted Convertible $25,001-$40,000 for the Z3 2.8
- 1999 Car and Driver "Ten Best" for M Coupé / M Roadster
- 1999 Automobile Magazine "Design of the Year" award for the M Coupé
- 1999 Automobile Magazine "Best Sports Car" award for the M Coupé
- 2000 Intellichoice "Best Overall Value of the Year" - "Base Sport" for the Z3 Roadster 2.3
- 2000 Top Gear (TV show) "Driver's Car of the Year" for the M Coupé
- 2009 Jalopnik "Best 10 Cars of the Decade" feature for the M Coupé
- 2011 Top Gear "Hammond's Icons" for the M Coupé
