= Zé (given name) =

Zé is a Portuguese form of the given name José. Notable people with the name include:

- Zé (footballer, born 1991), Santomean football striker
- Zé Arigó (1921–1971), Brazilian "psychic surgeon"
- Zé Castro (born 1983), Portuguese football player
- Zé Elias (born 1976), Brazilian football player
- Zé Kalanga (born 1983), Angolan football player
- Zé Keti (1921–1999), Brazilian singer and composer
- Zé Laviola (born 1993), Brazilian politician
- Zé Lucas (born 2008), Brazilian football player
- Zé Ramalho (born 1949), Brazilian composer and performer
- Zé Roberto (born 1974), Brazilian football player
- Zé Sérgio (born 1957), Brazilian football player
- Zé Tó (born 1977), Portuguese football attacking midfielder

== See also ==
- Zé Carlos, a short form of the name José Carlos
- Zé Eduardo, a short form of the name José Eduardo
- Zé Manel, a short form of the name José Manuel
- Zé Maria, a short form of the name José Maria
- Zé Roberto (disambiguation), a short form of the name José Roberto
