= BMW M54 =

BMW M54 engine
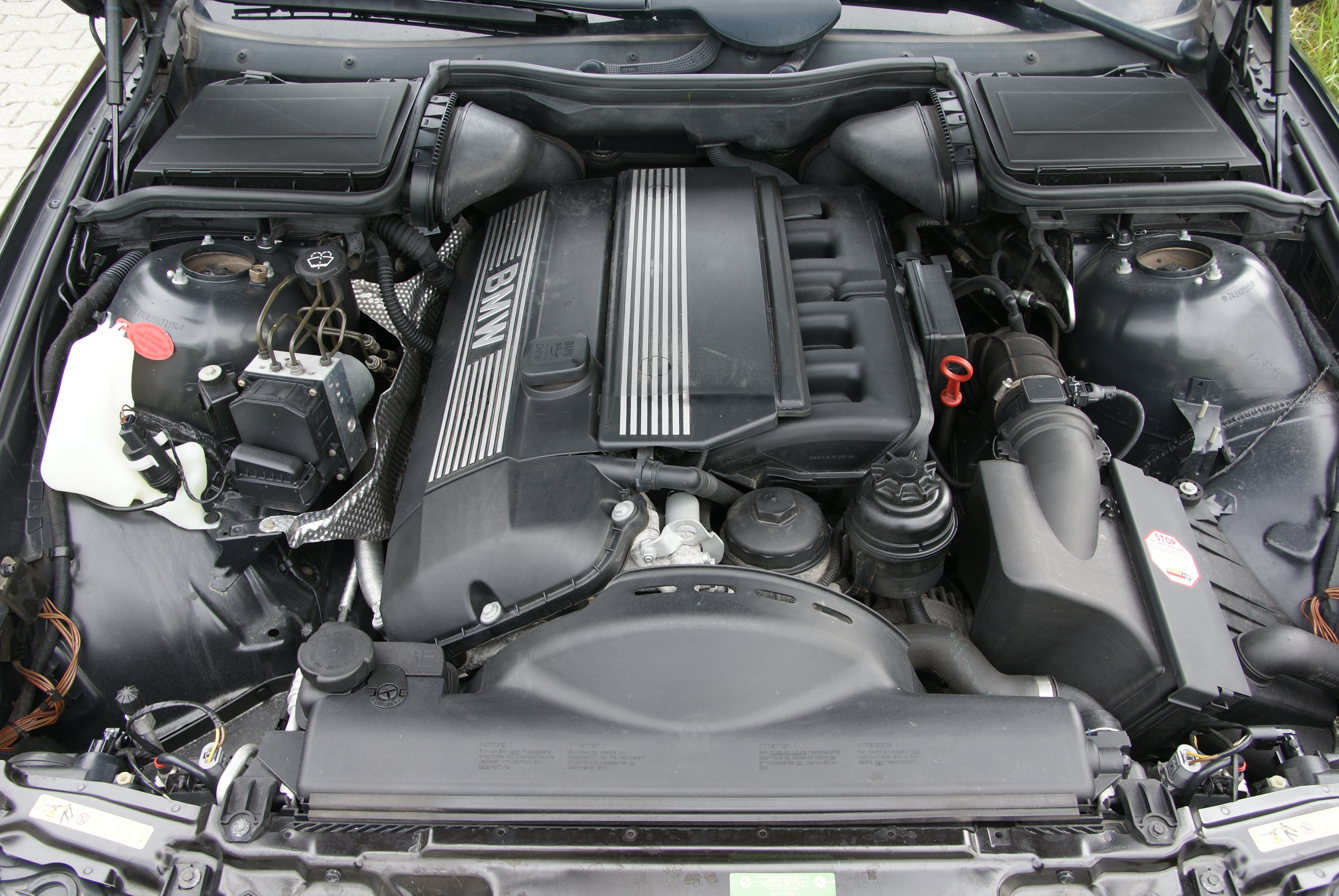
- M54B25 in a E39 525i

Overview
- Production: 2000–2006

Layout
- Configuration: Straight-6
- Displacement: 2,171 cc (132 cu in); 2,494 cc (152 cu in); 2,979 cc (182 cu in)
- Cylinder bore: 80 mm (3.1 in); 84 mm (3.3 in)
- Piston stroke: 72 mm (2.8 in); 75 mm (3.0 in); 89.6 mm (3.53 in)
- Cylinder block material: Aluminium
- Cylinder head material: Aluminium
- Valvetrain: DOHC w/ Dual VVT

Combustion
- Fuel type: Petrol

Chronology
- Predecessor: BMW M52TÜ
- Successor: BMW N52

The BMW M54 is a naturally aspirated straight-6 DOHC petrol engine produced from 2000 to 2006 and is the replacement for the M52TÜ engine. The S54 is the equivalent high-performance engine, used in the E46 M3, the Z3 M Coupé/Roadster and the E85/E86 Z4 M. The BMW M56 SULEV engine (sold in several states of the United States) is based on the M54.

The M54 was phased out following the introduction of the BMW N52 engine in 2004. From 2001 to 2003, the M54 was included on the Ward's 10 Best Engines.

== Design ==
Compared with the outgoing M52TÜ, the block and head design are identical; with most parts between the two engines being interchangeable. Both contain an aluminium block and cylinder head with iron cylinder liners, variable valve timing is fitted to both camshafts (called "double-VANOS"), a dual length intake manifold (called "DISA") is used and the thermostat is electronically controlled. The redline remains at 6,500 rpm.

Differing from the M52TÜ however, the M54 has a non-return fuel system, a fully electronic throttle (without mechanical backup), Siemens MS43 engine management, and a revised intake manifold. The displacement of the largest variant increased from 2.8 L to 3.0 L (2,979 cc), due to an increase in stroke to 89.6 mm (3.53 in). There was no "technical update" (TÜ) version of the M54 produced, therefore the engine specifications remained the same throughout its seven-year production run.

== Versions ==
Version	Displacement	Power	Torque	Years
M54B22	2.2 L (2,171 cc)	125 kW (170 PS; 168 bhp) at 6,100 rpm	210 N⋅m (155 lb⋅ft) at 3,500 rpm	2000–2006
M54B25	2.5 L (2,494 cc)	141 kW (192 PS; 189 bhp) at 6,000 rpm	245 N⋅m (181 lb⋅ft) at 3,500 rpm	2000–2006
M54B30	3.0 L (2,979 cc)	170 kW (231 PS; 228 bhp) at 5,900 rpm	300 N⋅m (221 lb⋅ft) at 3,500 rpm	2000–2006
S54B32	3.2 L (3,246 cc)	252 kW (343 PS; 338 bhp) at 7,900 rpm	365 N⋅m (269 lb⋅ft) at 4,900 rpm	2000–2008

=== M54B22 ===
The 2,171 cc (132.5 cu in) M54B22 produces 125 kW (170 PS; 168 bhp) at 6,100 rpm and 210 N⋅m (155 lb⋅ft) at 3,500 rpm. Bore is 80 mm (3.15 in), stroke is 72 mm (2.83 in) and the compression ratio is 10.8:1.

Applications

- 2000–2006 E46 320i, 320Ci
- 2000–2003 E39 520i
- 2000–2002 E36/7 Z3 2.2i
- 2003–2005 E85 Z4 2.2i
- 2003–2005 E60/E61 520i

=== M54B25 ===
The 2,494 cc (152.2 cu in) M54B25 produces 141 kW (192 PS; 189 bhp) at 6,000 rpm and 245 N⋅m (181 lb⋅ft) at 3,500 rpm. Bore is 84 mm (3.31 in), stroke is 75 mm (2.95 in) and the compression ratio is 10.5:1.

Applications

- 2000–2002 E36/7 Z3 2.5i
- 2000–2006 E46 325i, 325xi, 325Ci
- 2000–2004 E46/5 325ti
- 2000–2004 E39 525i
- 2003–2005 E60/E61 525i, 525xi
- 2003–2006 E83 X3 2.5i
- 2002–2005 E85 Z4 2.5i

=== M54B30 ===
The 2,979 cc (181.8 cu in) M54B30 is the largest M54 variant and produces 170 kW (231 PS; 228 bhp) at 5,900 rpm and 300 N⋅m (221 lb⋅ft) at 3,500 rpm. Bore is 84 mm (3.31 in), stroke is 89.6 mm (3.53 in) and the compression ratio is 10.2:1.

In the United States and Canada, a "ZHP" version of the M54B30 used different camshafts and reprogrammed engine management to develop 175 kW (238 PS; 235 bhp) at 5,900 rpm and 301 N⋅m (222 lb⋅ft) at 3,500 rpm and have a slightly higher redline of 6,800 rpm (although the Canadian cars still show the limiter at 6,500 rpm on the tachometer).

The M54B30 was on the Ward's 10 Best Engines list through 2001–2003.

Applications

- 2000–2006 E46 330i, 330xi, 330Ci
- 2000–2004 E39 530i
- 2000–2002 E36/7 Z3 3.0i
- 2003–2005 E60 530i
- 2002–2005 E85 Z4 3.0i
- 2003–2006 E83 X3 3.0i
- 2000–2006 E53 X5 3.0i
- 2002–2005 E65/E66 730i, 730Li
- 2000–2002 Wiesmann MF 30

== S54 ==
BMW S54 engine
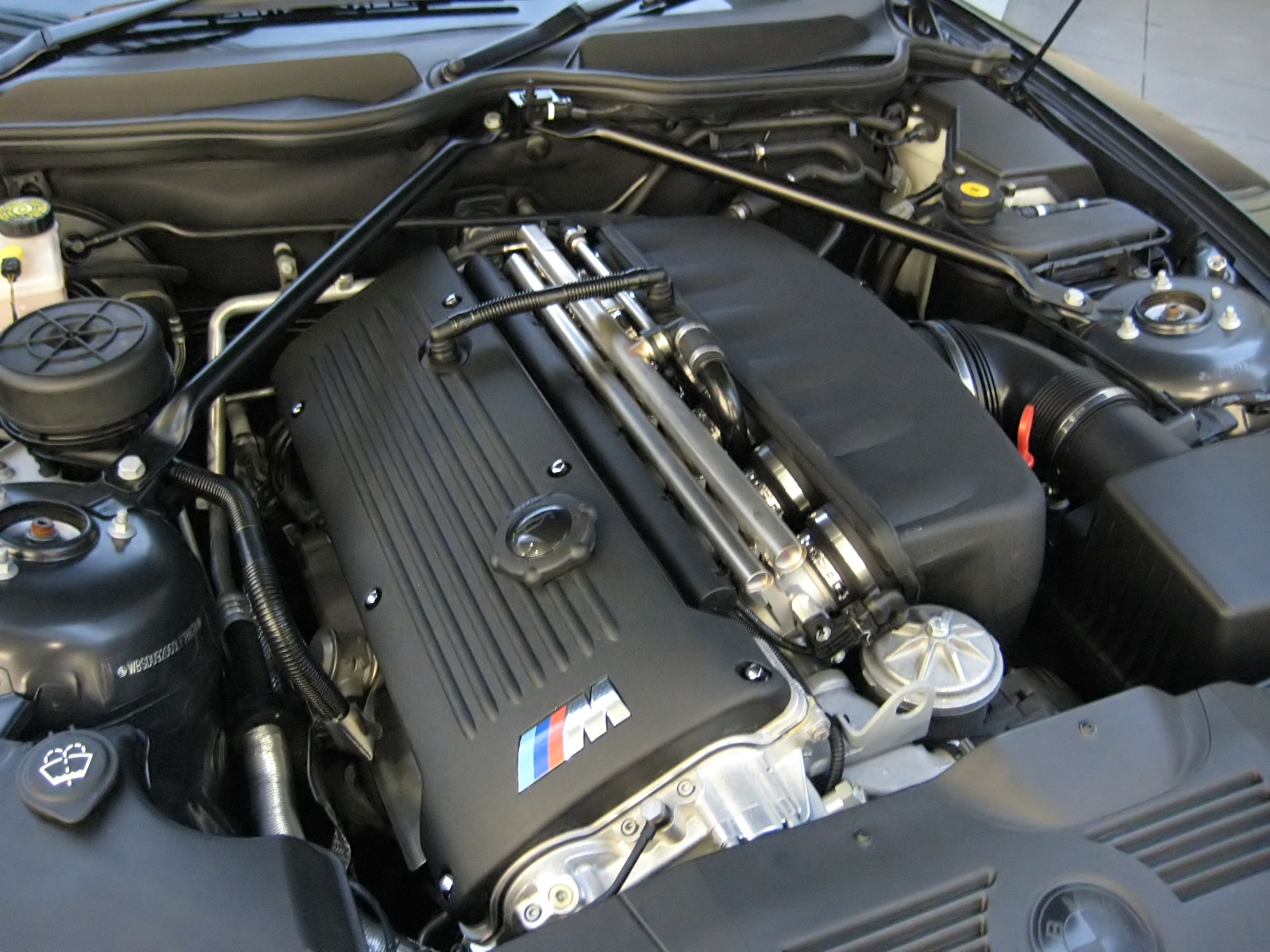
- S54B32 in a E86 Z4 M Coupé

Overview
- Production: 2000–2011

Layout
- Configuration: straight-6
- Displacement: 3.2 L (3,246 cc)
- Cylinder bore: 87 mm (3.4 in)
- Piston stroke: 91 mm (3.6 in)
- Cylinder block material: Cast iron
- Cylinder head material: Aluminium
- Valvetrain: DOHC w/ VVT

Combustion
- Fuel type: Gasoline

Chronology
- Predecessor: BMW S50
- Successor: BMW S65 (M3 lineage) BMW S55 (Straight-six lineage)

The S54 was marketed as the high performance equivalent to the M54, however it is actually more an evolution of the BMW S50 and shares few parts with the M54. As per the S50, the engine block is made of cast iron, unlike the aluminium engine block used by the M54. Redline is 8,000 rpm.

Compared with the S50, the S54 features:

- Bore increased to 87 mm (3.43 in), resulting in a displacement of 3,246 cc (198.1 cu in)
- Revised camshafts
- Finger follower valve actuation instead of bucket-style tappets
- Compression ratio increased from 11.3:1 to 11.5:1
- Siemens MSS54 engine control unit (MSS70 in the later Z4 M)
- Electronic throttle control
- Scavenging oil pump to avoid oil starvation during cornering (this was also present on the S50B30 of the E36 M3 GT and the S50B32, but not the regular S50B30)

There is no direct successor to the S54, since the following generation E90/E92/E93 M3 was powered by the V8 BMW S65 engine.

=== S54B32 ===
Variations in power and torque outputs are often due to country-specific emissions regulations, or space constraints of a chassis affecting the layout of the intake/exhaust system.

Applications

- 2000–2006 E46 M3 — produces 252 kW (343 PS; 338 hp) at 7,900 rpm and 365 N⋅m (269 lb⋅ft) at 4,900 rpm. Models for the United States and Canada produce 248 kW (333 hp) and 355 N⋅m (262 lb⋅ft).
- 2000–2002 E36/7 Z3 M Roadster, E36/8 M Coupé — produces 239 kW (325 PS; 321 hp) and 354 N⋅m (261 lb⋅ft). Models for the United States and Canada produce 235 kW (315 hp) and 341 N⋅m (252 lb⋅ft).
- 2002–2011 Wiesmann MF 3 Roadster — produces 252 kW (343 PS; 338 hp) and 365 N⋅m (269 lb⋅ft).
- 2006–2008 E85 Z4 M Roadster, E86 Z4 M Coupé — produces 252 kW (343 PS; 338 hp) and 365 N⋅m (269 lb⋅ft) - Engine code 326S4. Models for the United States and Canada produce 246 kW (330 hp) and 355 N⋅m (262 lb⋅ft). The Z4 M's engine uses a Siemens MSS70 control unit.

=== S54B32HP ===
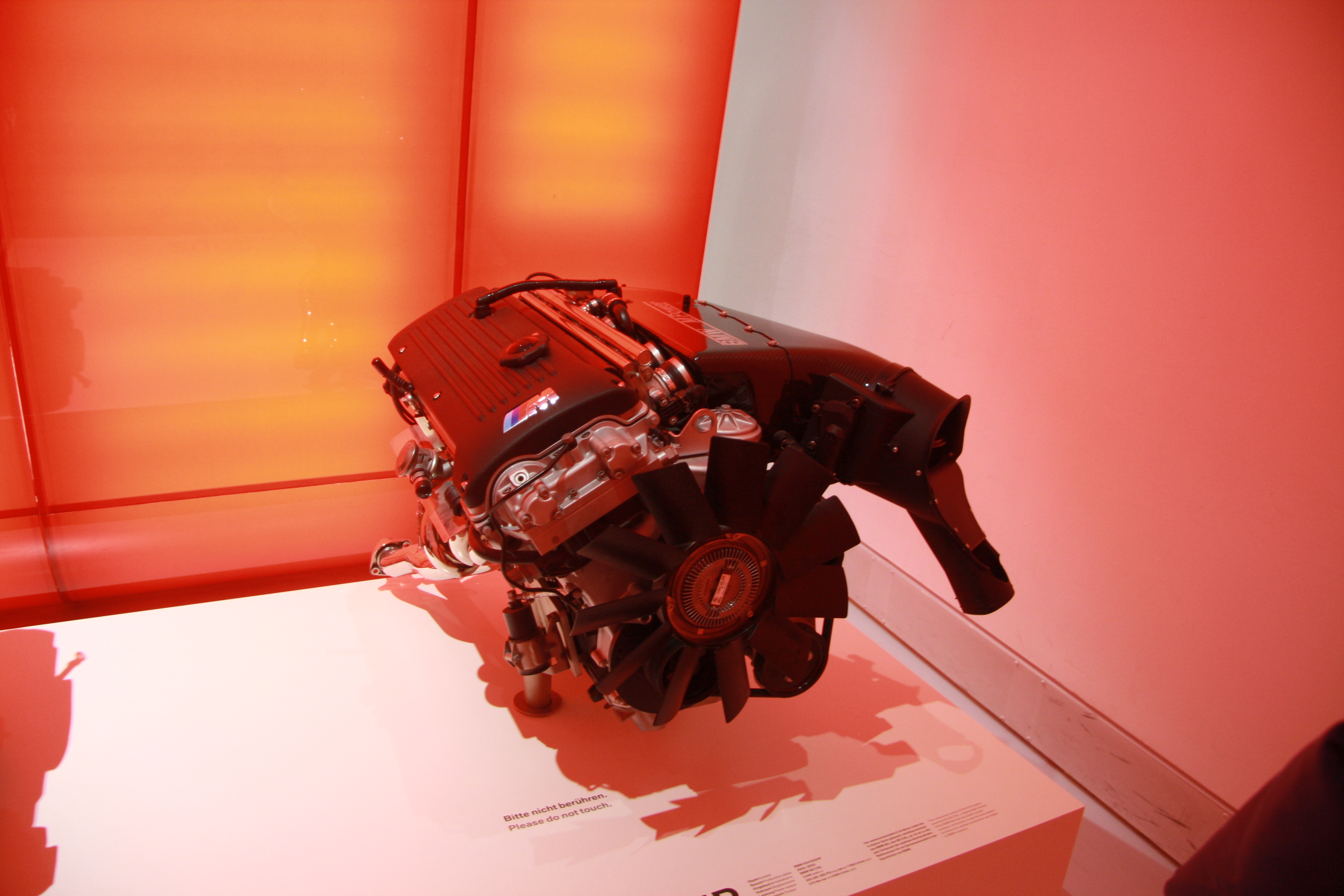
S54B32HP engine in BMW-Museum, Munich.

An upgraded version of the S54 engine was used in the E46 M3 CSL. This engine is designated S54B32HP and the changes include a revised intake made from carbon fiber, revised camshafts, a MAP sensor (instead of the MAF sensor used in the regular S54), a lightweight exhaust manifold with a straighter air path (which later became standard on the regular S54) and a straightened intake manifold.

Applications

- 2003 E46 M3 CSL 265 kW (360 hp), 370 N⋅m (273 lb⋅ft)
- 2009 Wiesmann MF 3 Roadster "20th Anniversary Edition" — produces 265 kW (360 hp), 370 N⋅m (273 lb⋅ft)

== See also ==
- List of BMW engines
