= BMW M50 =

BMW M50 engine
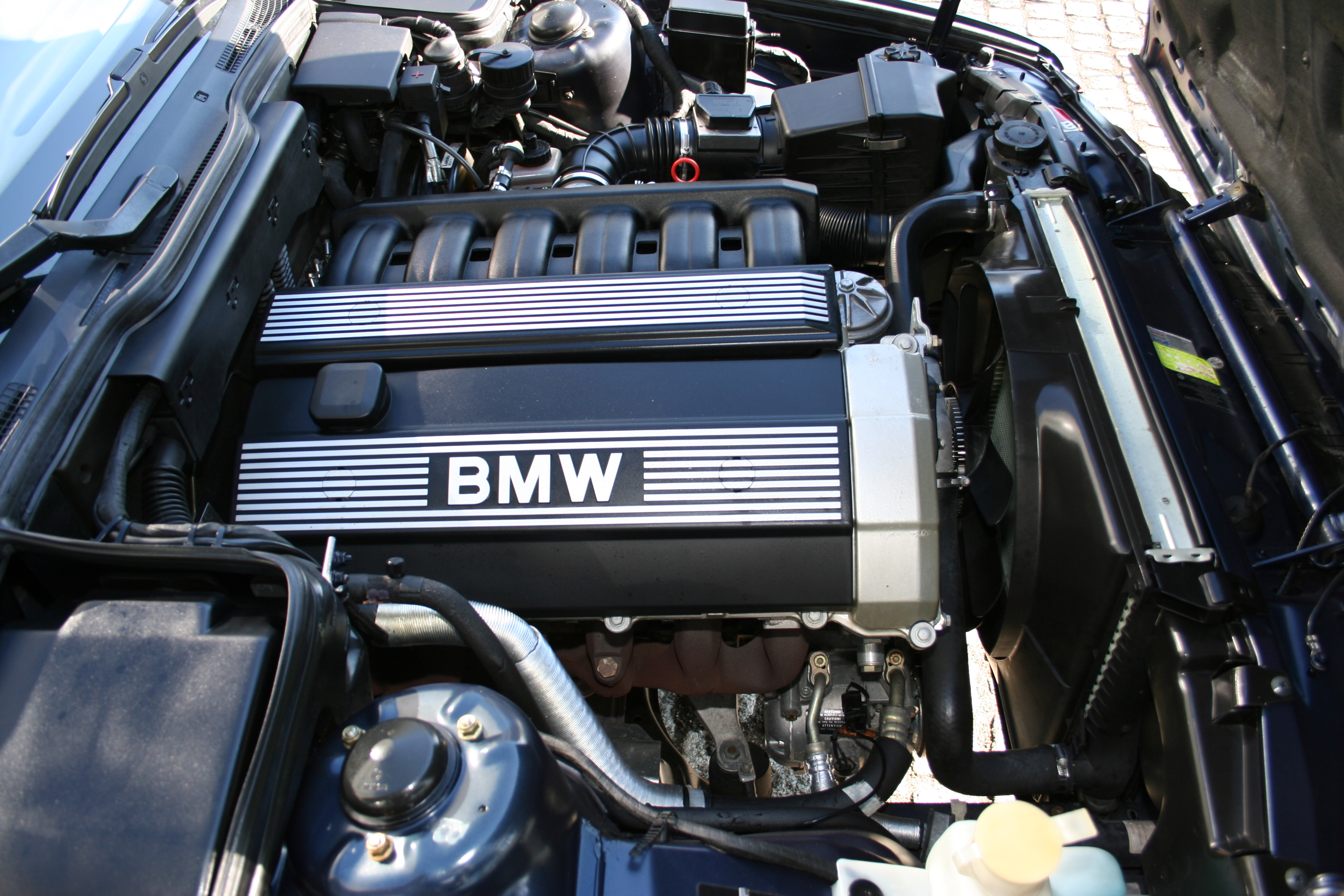

Overview
- Production: 1990–1995

Layout
- Configuration: Straight-6
- Displacement: 1,991 cc (121 cu in); 2,494 cc (152 cu in)
- Cylinder bore: 80 mm (3.1 in); 84 mm (3.3 in)
- Piston stroke: 66 mm (2.6 in); 75 mm (3.0 in)
- Cylinder block material: Cast iron
- Cylinder head material: Aluminium
- Valvetrain: DOHC

Combustion
- Fuel type: Petrol

Chronology
- Predecessor: BMW M20 and M30
- Successor: BMW M50TÜ

The BMW M50 is a straight-6 DOHC petrol engine which was produced from 1990 to 1996. It was first released in the E34 520i and 525i to replace the M20 engine and the new E36 320i and 325i. In September 1992, the M50TÜ "technical update" (Technische Überarbeitung) introduced BMW's use of Variable Valve Timing (called VANOS) to its engines. The S50 was introduced in 1992 as a high-performance variant of the M50, which powered the E36 M3 and Z3 M. The M50 began to be phased out following the introduction of the M52 engine in 1994.

== Design ==
The M50 is pivotal in the history of BMW inline-six engines, as it slowly replaced the decades long run of both the 'Little-Six' M20 and 'Big-Six' M30; marrying the best qualities of both engines into a revised, electronically integrated and more modern package. The M50 is based on the design of the M20 and received many upgrades from its predecessor; primarily introducing a dual overhead camshaft valvetrain (DOHC) with four valves per cylinder and a redesigned engine block.

Compared to the M20, the M50's block is taller and contains oil passages which feed the cams directly. The pistons are also lighter than the M20's, which offsets the added weight of the block. Borrowed from the design of the M30, the M50 is now chain-driven (as opposed to the belt-drive used on the M20) and inherited a crankshaft-driven oil pump. The new head contained a coil-on-plug ignition, a knock sensor and a completely redesigned and more streamlined high-flow intake manifold and is the final inline-six BMW engine to not include any variable valve timing. Like the final iterations of the M20, the M50 employs multi-point electronic fuel injection and likewise uses an iron block with an aluminum alloy head. The redline remained untouched. The location of the oil pan (sump) varies according to the model the M50 is installed in. It is in the front on the E34 5 Series (not unlike the M20), whereas it is in the rear on the E36 3 Series. The iron engine block, healthy output and relatively simple design make the M50 a popular choice for enthusiast tuning, forced induction and engine swaps.

A new upgraded Bosch Motronic 3.1 engine management system introduced OBD-I compliance, which allows the engine to interface easily with modern diagnostic and tuning tools by way of a 20-pin connector found under the bonnet. Despite the different shape, it is electrically identical to a regular OBD-I port, and a passive cable is all that is needed to use standard tools. However, the sensors and other electronics remain relatively simple; as no version of the M50 contained the now-ubiquitous CANBUS communication protocol and was not introduced in until its successor, the M52. Instead, each piece of engine data is polled directly from the engine management system on their own lines.

== Models ==
Engine	Displacement	Power	Torque	Years
M50B20	1,991 cc (121.5 cu in)	110 kW (150 PS; 148 hp) at 6,000 rpm	190 N⋅m (140 lb⋅ft) at 4,700 rpm	1990-1992
M50B25	2,494 cc (152.2 cu in)	141 kW (192 PS; 189 hp) at 6,000 rpm	245 N⋅m (181 lb⋅ft) at 4,700 rpm	1990-1992

=== M50B20 ===
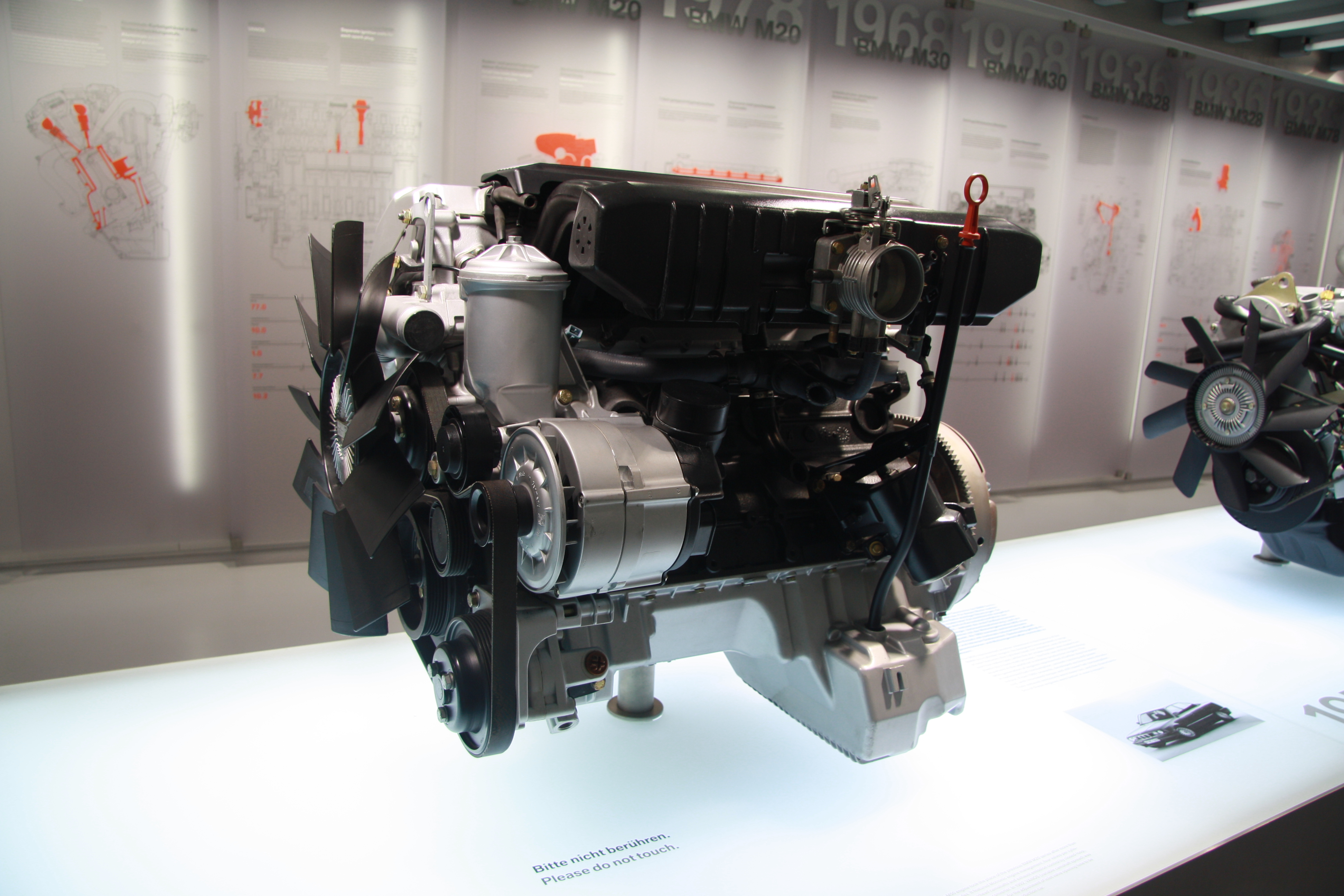
M50 engine in BMW Museum

The 1,991 cc (121.5 cu in) M50B20 was introduced with the 1990 520i. It has a bore of 80 mm (3.15 in), a stroke of 66 mm (2.60 in) and produces 110 kW (150 PS; 148 hp). The compression ratio is 10.5:1.

Applications:

- 1990-1992 E34 520i
- 1991-1995 E36 320i

=== M50B25 ===
The 2,494 cc (152.2 cu in) M50B25 was introduced with the 1990 525i and 525ix. It has a bore of 84 mm (3.31 in), a stroke of 75 mm (2.95 in) and produces 141 kW (192 PS; 189 hp) at 6,000 rpm and 245 N⋅m (181 lb⋅ft) at 4,700 rpm. The compression ratio is 10.0:1.

Applications:

- 1990-1992 E34 525i, 525ix
- 1991-1992 E36 325i, 325is

== M50TÜ ==
BMW M50TÜ engine
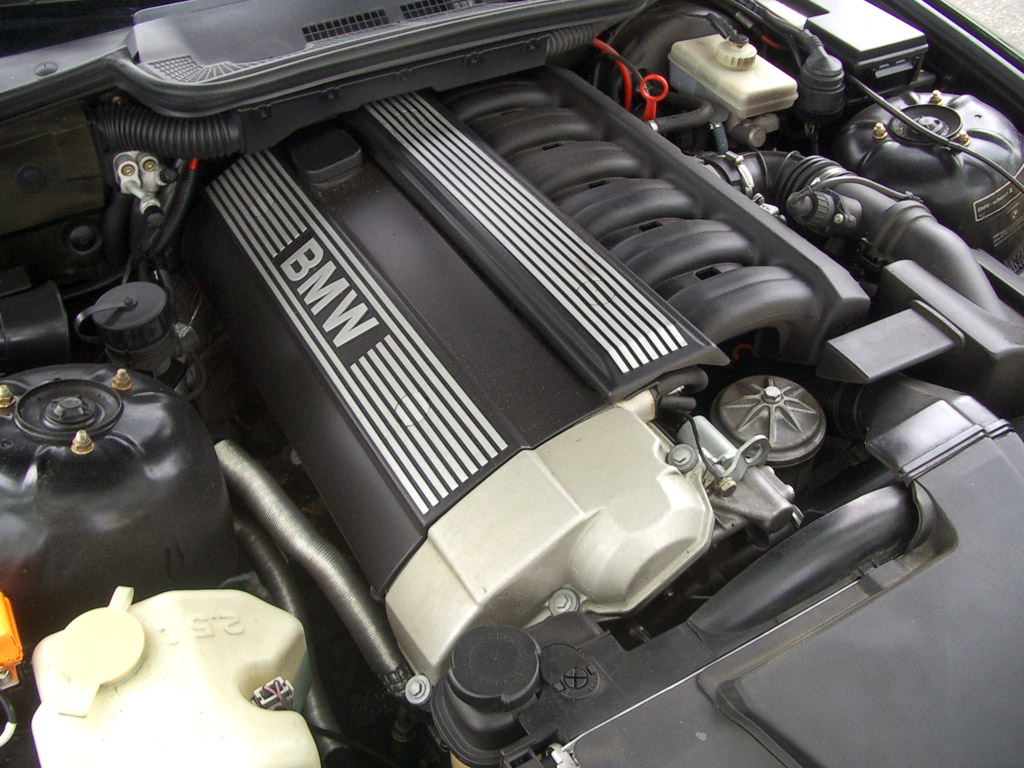

Overview
- Production: 1992–1996

Layout
- Configuration: Straight-6
- Displacement: 1,991 cc (121 cu in); 2,394 cc (146 cu in); 2,494 cc (152 cu in)
- Cylinder bore: 80 mm (3.1 in); 84 mm (3.3 in)
- Piston stroke: 66 mm (2.6 in); 72 mm (2.8 in); 75 mm (3.0 in)
- Cylinder block material: Cast iron
- Cylinder head material: Aluminium
- Valvetrain: DOHC, VVT

Combustion
- Fuel type: Petrol

Chronology
- Predecessor: BMW M50
- Successor: BMW M52

In order to meet the brand-new Euro 1 emission standard, BMW phased out the M50 with the release of with the M50TÜ in September of 1992. The largest notable change was the introduction of Variable Valve Timing (denoted as VANOS by BMW) on the inlet camshaft; the first of any BMW engine to do so. This had the effect of lowering fuel consumption and flattening the torque curve, which allowed for marginally faster acceleration and better engine response. The engine head was thus redesigned to accommodate for the electronically controlled but hydraulically activated VANOS solenoid; and gives the head a distinctive 'bump' on one side, which makes it easily distinguishable from the M50 at a glance.

In order to accommodate for the new VANOS system, a new Bosche Motronic 3.3 engine management system was introduced; which like the M50, was also OBD-I compliant - with a round 20-pin connector continuing to live under the bonnet. Despite these differences, the M50 and M50TÜ are extremely similar and most of their parts are interchangeable; with many upgrades or modifications are identical processes on both. The initial design for the M52 is also very much akin to the design of the M50TÜ, with many of its differences mainly lying in its engine management system and the inlet manifold. The M50TÜ also is the final non-M BMW engine to have a cast-iron block for worldwide use, and is heavily coveted by enthusiasts who enjoy a highly stable block which is famously resistant to warping for forced-induction modifications - although the North American market kept the cast-iron block for the original release of the M52 due to high sulfur content in their fuel. The pistons were altered to receive longer connecting rods and thus a raised wristpin, which allowed for lower friction against the cylinder walls and for an overall lighter piston assembly. The head received similar minor changes; as the valves springs were changed to a shorter, conical design to minimise weight transfer within the head.

The VANOS system proved to be extremely effective, and was slowly introduced into other engines over time. The first V8 to receive VANOS was the M62TÜ, and the first four-cylinder unit with VANOS was the N42 in 2001. VANOS would continue to develop and contrary to later designs, this initial iteration of VANOS lives on only one camshaft and is purely binary, being on or off instead of the more modern 'Dual-VANOS' systems which live on both camshafts and have continuously adjustable timing found in engines starting with the M52TÜ or the worldwide-spec S50B32.

== Models ==
Engine	Displacement	Power	Torque	Years
M50B20TÜ	1,991 cc (121.5 cu in)	110 kW (150 PS; 148 hp) at 5,900 rpm	190 N⋅m (140 lb⋅ft) at 4,200 rpm	1992-1996
M50B24TÜ	2,394 cc (146.1 cu in)	138 kW (188 PS; 185 hp) at 5,900 rpm	240 N⋅m (180 lb⋅ft) at 4,200 rpm	1992-1996
M50B25TÜ	2,494 cc (152.2 cu in)	141 kW (192 PS; 189 hp) at 5,900 rpm	250 N⋅m (180 lb⋅ft) at 4,200 rpm	1992-1996

=== M50B20TÜ ===
A 1,991 cc (121.5 cu in) version was introduced in 1992. It produces 110 kW (150 PS; 148 hp) at 5,900 rpm and 190 N⋅m (140 lb⋅ft) at 4,200 rpm. The compression ratio was raised to 11.0:1.

Applications:

- 1992-1994 E36 320i
- 1992-1996 E34 520i

=== M50B24TÜ ===
This is a 2,394 cc (146.1 cu in) engine used in the Thailand and Oceanian markets (excluding Australia and New Zealand). It is based on the 2,494 cc (2.5 L) M50B25TÜ with the stroke reduced to 72 mm (2.83 in) and produces 138 kW (188 PS; 185 hp) at 5,900 rpm and 240 N⋅m (180 lb⋅ft) at 4,200 rpm. The compression ratio is 10.5:1.

Applications:

- 1993-1995 E36 325iA/2.4
- 1992-1996 E34 525iA/2.4

=== M50B25TÜ ===
A 2,494 cc (152.2 cu in) version was introduced in 1992. It produces 141 kW (192 PS; 189 hp) at 5,900 rpm and 250 N⋅m (180 lb⋅ft) at 4,200 rpm. The compression ratio was increased to 10.5:1.

Applications:

- 1993-1995 E36 325i, 325is
- 1992-1996 E34 525i, 525ix

=== M50B30TÜ concept ===
In 1993, BMW Individual created a concept of BMW E34 530iX called Enduro Touring. Only one car was produced, having an up-sized variant of M50B25TÜ engine. Bore and stroke was increased and the total displacement of 3.0 was achieved. The power and torque both increased to 181 kW (246 PS; 243 hp) and 316 N⋅m (233 lb⋅ft) respectively.

== S50 ==
BMW S50 engine
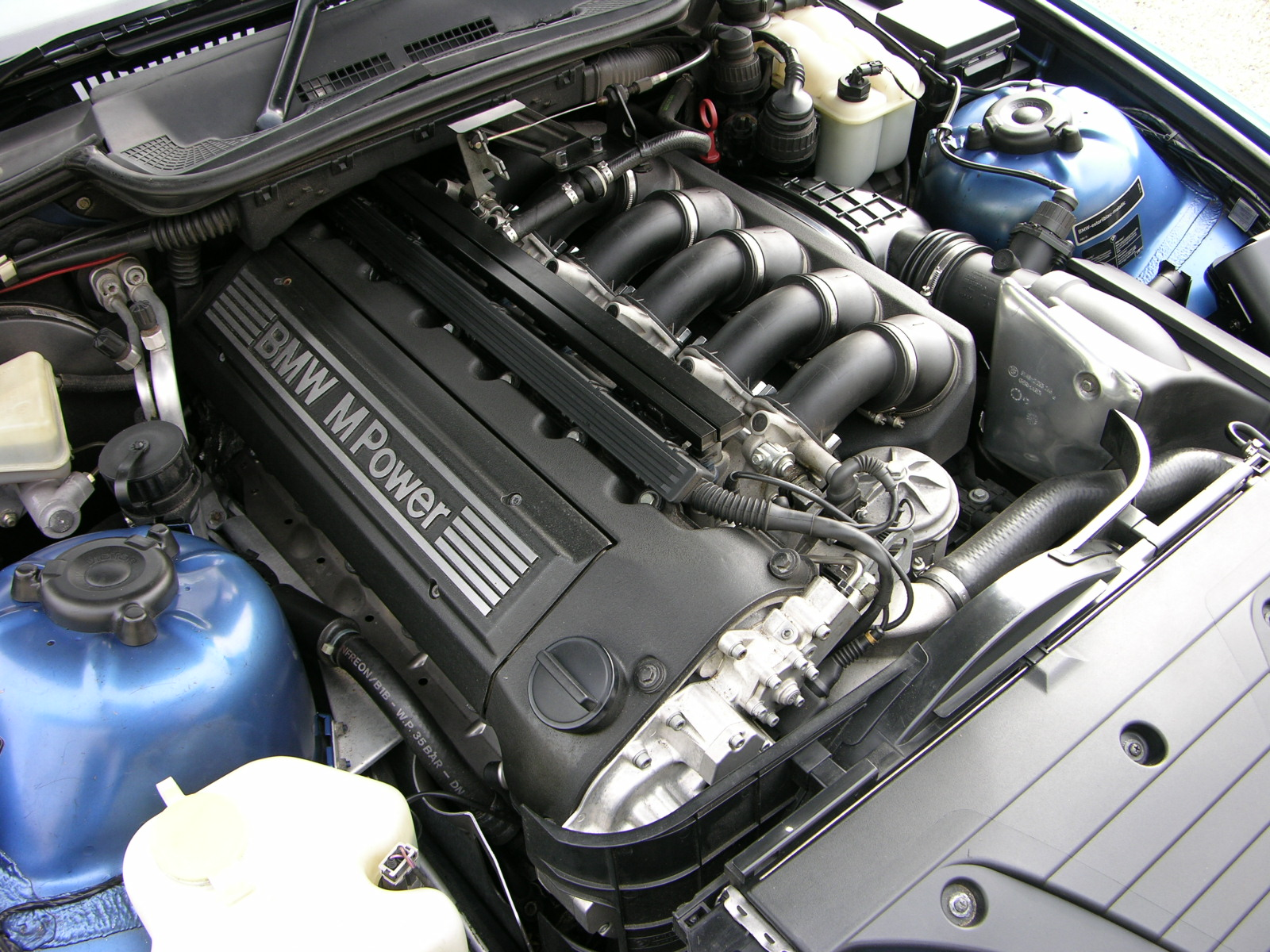

Overview
- Production: 1992–2000

Layout
- Configuration: Straight-6
- Displacement: 2,990 cc (182 cu in); 3,201 cc (195 cu in)
- Cylinder bore: 86 mm (3.4 in); 86.4 mm (3.40 in)
- Piston stroke: 85.8 mm (3.38 in); 91 mm (3.6 in)
- Cylinder block material: Cast iron
- Cylinder head material: Aluminium
- Valvetrain: DOHC, with VVT

Combustion
- Fuel type: Petrol

Chronology
- Predecessor: None
- Successor: BMW S52 and S54

The S50 is the high-performance version of the M50 which was used in the E36 M3 and worldwide-spec Z3 M, replacing the four-cylinder BMW S14 engine used in the E30 M3. Like the M50, the S50 has an iron block and aluminum head and a DOHC valvetrain with four valves per cylinder. In the North American market, a less powerful variant called the "S50B30US" was used, which shares more in common with the regular M50 engine than the other S50 versions.

=== S50B30 ===
The S50B30 was used in most countries, except for the North American market (Note: In 1993, BMW Canada officially imported 45 M3 coupes with the S50B30 engine.) and produces 210 kW (286 PS; 282 hp), has a bore of 86 mm (3.39 in), a stroke of 85.8 mm (3.38 in) and a compression ratio of 10.8:1. The redline is 7,200 rpm. The S50 has an individual throttle body for each cylinder, single-VANOS (variable valve timing on the intake camshaft) and Bosch Motronic M3.3 engine management and redesigned intake and exhaust systems.

=== S50B30 (M3-R) ===
In 1994, a variant of the S50B30 was created by BMW Australia in partnership with Frank Gardner Racing in Queensland as a limited homologation M3-R for the Australian GT Production Car Championship, being the most powerful of all official S50 variants - rated at 240 kW (326 PS; 322 hp). Only fifteen examples were made, with four used on the track and the remaining eleven were sold to the public. They were honed in with AC Schnitzer camshafts, optimised exhaust ports, a more violent tune and a redesigned cold-air intake. Given that all examples were for the Australian market, this is one of the very few BMW engine variants to be exclusively found in only right-hand-drive models.

=== S50B30GT ===
A homologation special "M3 GT" model was introduced in 1994 with a new engine based on the worldwide-spec S50B30, producing an increased 220 kW (299 PS; 295 hp) by way of a more aggressive tune, new camshafts and a redesigned sump and oil pump.

=== S50B30US ===
In the North American market, the 1994-1995 model years of the E36 M3 are powered by the S50B30US, a 2,990 cc (182.5 cu in) engine which produces 179 kW (243 PS; 240 hp). This engine is more closely related to the standard M50 engine and has the same compression ratio as the M50B25TÜ, but uses a different camshafts, crankshaft, connecting rods, and pistons. The bore is 86 mm (3.39 in), the stroke is 85.8 mm (3.38 in) and the redline is 7,000 rpm.

The S50B30US motor was created as a compromise to make the E36 M3 a reality in the United States. Unlike in Europe, the E30 M3 was considered a business failure in America. American customers did not see the value proposition of this vehicle compared to a 325i. Due to this, E30 M3s sold poorly in the United States with just over 5,000 units sold. For comparison, the 325i sold just under 350,000 units. Because of this, BMW of North America planned on retiring the M brand in the US and with it any plans to bring the E36 M3 to America. This was until an editor for the BMW Car Club of America, Bob Roehmer, encouraged BMW CCA members to mail BMW of North America letters asking them to bring the car to the United States. Many BMW CCA members pledged to buy an E36 M3 if it was brought to the United States at a reasonable price. To meet this caveat, Erik Wensberg, the manager of the BMW M Brand in North America, decided to remove the European spec S50 motor and replace it with a BMW M Division-tuned M50 variant. This motor would become the S50B30US and would only be found in American spec E36 M3s.

In 1996, the S50B30US was replaced by the BMW S52 engine (in the United States and Canada only). This motor was a derivative of the M52, and while it maintained the same 240 horsepower as the S50B30US, it gained 15 N⋅m (11 lb⋅ft) of torque and increased displacement from 3000cc to 3200cc.

=== S50B32 ===
In 1995, the S50B32 replaced the S50B30 in worldwide markets. (Note: United States and Canada received the BMW S52 instead.) Power output increased to 236 kW (321 PS; 316 hp) and the displacement increased to 3.2 L; 195.3 cu in (3,201 cc), due to an increased stroke of 91 mm (3.58 in) and a slight increase in bore to 86.4 mm (3.40 in). The S50B32 introduced the first Dual-VANOS system (variable valve timing on both camshafts) and was continuously adjustable unlike the binary system found on the M50TÜ and a secondary oil pick-up was added. The compression ratio is 11.3:1 and the redline is 7,600 rpm. Engine management also got upgraded to the Siemens MSS50, with 3 knock sensors.

== Models ==
Engine	Displacement	Power	Torque	Years
S50B30	2,990 cc (182.5 cu in)	210 kW (286 PS; 282 hp) at 7,000 rpm (Note: U.S. models were produced from 1993-1995 and were rated at 240 hp (180 kW; 240 PS) at 6,000 rpm and 305 N⋅m (225 lb⋅ft) at 4,250 rpm.)	329 N⋅m (243 lb⋅ft) at 3,500 rpm	1992-1995
S50B30 (M3-R)	2,990 cc (182.5 cu in)	240 kW (326 PS; 322 hp) at 7,200 rpm (Note: U.S. models were produced from 1993-1995 and were rated at 240 hp (180 kW; 240 PS) at 6,000 rpm and 305 N⋅m (225 lb⋅ft) at 4,250 rpm.)	320 N⋅m (236 lb⋅ft) at 3,500 rpm	1994
S50B30GT	2,990 cc (182.5 cu in)	217 kW (295 PS; 291 hp) at 7,100 rpm	323 N⋅m (238 lb⋅ft) at 3,900 rpm	1994-1995
S50B30US	2,990 cc (182.5 cu in)	179 kW (243 PS; 240 hp) at 6,000 rpm	225 lb⋅ft (305 N⋅m) at 4,250 rpm	1994-1995
S50B32	3,201 cc (195.3 cu in)	236 kW (321 PS; 316 hp) at 7,400 rpm	350 N⋅m (260 lb⋅ft) at 3,250 rpm	1995-2000

=== S50B30 ===
Applications:

- 1992-1995 E36 M3 (except for U.S.)

=== S50B30 (M3-R) ===
- 1994 E36 M3-R (Australia only)

=== S50B30GT ===
Applications:

- 1994-1995 E36 M3 GT Coupé

=== S50B30US ===
Applications:

- 1994-1995 E36 M3 (U.S. only)

=== S50B32 ===
Applications:

- 1995-1999 BMW M3 (E36) (except Canada and the United States)
- 1996-2000 BMW M Coupé and M Roadster (except Canada and the United States)

== See also ==
- BMW engines
