= EDC =

EDC or EdC may refer to:

== Chemistry and medicine ==
- 1-Ethyl-3-(3-dimethylaminopropyl)carbodiimide, a water-soluble carbodiimide
- Electrodesiccation and curettage, a medical procedure commonly performed by dermatologists
- Electronic data capture, computerized system to collect clinical trial data
- Endocrine disruptor chemical, compound disturbing hormone systems of animals
- Epidermal differentiation complex, a gene complex comprising over fifty genes
- Estradiol dicypionate, an estrogen ester
- Estimated date of confinement, the estimated date of delivery for a pregnant woman
- Ethylene dichloride, a colourless liquid with a chloroform-like odour
- Extensor digitorum communis, a muscle of the posterior forearm of humans and other animals

== Dance and music ==
- EDC, a 1994 album by the band Satchel
- Electric Daisy Carnival, a music festival
- Entertainment Distribution Company, a music distribution center
- Étienne de Crécy (born 1969), a French DJ and producer
- Eurovision Dance Contest

== Economics ==
- Dubai Export Development Corporation
- Economic development committee, a subordinate body to the UK's National Economic Development Council
- Economic development corporation, type of organisation in the US that promotes economic growth
- Export Development Canada, Canada's export credit agency

== Education ==
- East Devon College, in Tiverton, Devon, England
- EDC Paris Business School, a French business school
- Education Development Center, an American educational organization
- Department for Education (South Australia) § Education Development Centre, conference centre run by the South Australian Department for Education

== Political parties ==
- Christian Democratic Team of the Spanish State (Spanish: Equipo Demócrata Cristiano), a defunct political party in Spain
- Democratic Left of Catalonia (Catalan: Esquerra Democràtica de Catalunya), a defunct political party in Spain

== Transportation and sports ==
- Austin Executive Airport (FAA LID: EDC), in Texas, United States
- Electronic Diesel Control, an engine fuel injection system
- European Drift Championship, a motorsport championship in the United Kingdom

== Other uses ==
- Electricidad de Caracas, the integrated electricity company for Caracas, Venezuela
- Energy Development Corporation, a renewable energy company in the Philippines
- Error detecting code
- European Defence Community, the European defence organisation outlined in an unratified 1950s treaty
- European Development Centre (disambiguation), departments of Digital Research and Novell in the UK
- European Documentation Centre, academic library service providing European Commission documents
- Everyday carry (EDC), various survival and weaponry items
- Expediency Discernment Council, an administrative assembly and advisory body of the Government of Iran
