= BMW M21 =

Overview
- Manufacturer: BMW Motoren GmbH Steyr
- Production: 1983–1991

Layout
- Configuration: Straight-6
- Displacement: 2.4 L (2,443 cc)
- Cylinder bore: 80 mm (3.15 in)
- Piston stroke: 81 mm (3.19 in)
- Cylinder block material: Cast iron
- Valvetrain: SOHC 2 valves x cyl.
- Compression ratio: 22.0:1

Combustion
- Operating principle: Diesel
- Turbocharger: Garrett T03 ('td' versions), None ('d' versions)
- Fuel system: Swirl chamber injection, distributor fuel injection pump
- Fuel type: Diesel fuel 45 CN (DIN 51601)
- Cooling system: Water-cooled

Output
- Power output: 63–85 kW (84–114 hp)
- Torque output: 152–220 N⋅m (112–162 lb⋅ft)

Chronology
- Predecessor: None
- Successor: M51

The BMW M21 is a straight-six diesel engine developed by the German engine manufacturer BMW. It has swirl chamber injection and is based on the M20 petrol engine and was produced for BMW by the Upper Austrian Steyr engine plant from 1983 to 1991. It was succeeded by the M51.

== Background ==
In the 1970s BMW decided to develop an engine, which would both be powerful and have a good fuel economy. This was caused by the oil crisis in 1973. In 1975 a group of BMW engineers started working on the M78/M105 diesel engine project, using the M20 petrol engine as the basis. By the time the engine entered production, the code name was changed to M21. The Steyr engine plant was planned from the beginning to be the sole manufacturer of the new diesel engine. It started as a joint venture with Steyr-Daimler Puch in 1978, but in February 1982 BMW took over the reins. The first engines built there (in early 1982) were six-cylinder petrol units. Beginning in 1983, Ford was planning to buy 190,000 BMW turbodiesels over a period of several years. With the American diesel market imploding in the early 1980s, Ford only built a small number of Lincolns thus equipped and only for two model years.

In 1983 at the IAA, the first passenger car was shown to the public which made use of the 85 kW (115 PS) M21. It was the E28 524td, which has a top speed of 180 km/h (110 mph) and reaches 100 km/h (62 mph) in 12.9 s. This 5-series BMW was the fastest series production diesel car in the world in 1983. It has a fuel economy of 7.1 L/100 km (40 mpg_{‑imp}; 33 mpg_{‑US}).

== Technical description ==
As per the M20, the M21 is water-cooled, has a cast iron block and a SOHC valvetrain. The camshaft is driven by a belt, each cylinder has one inlet and one outlet valve. Compared to the M20, the M21 has reinforced connecting rods, cylinder heads, pistons, valves and a reinforced crankshaft with seven bearings.

For faster engine startup the M21 has a glowplug system called instant start, which reduces the time to reach starting temperature compared to similar diesel engines. The fuel is injected into swirl chambers.

A Garrett turbocharger is used (without an intercooler). Initially, the M21 was only available as a turbocharged engine. In 1985, BMW introduced a naturally aspirated version of the M21, which was popular in countries with a high motor vehicle tax.

Initially, the fuel pump was controlled mechanically. From 1987 Bosch's electronically controlled fuel pump was used (EDC, called DDE, Digital Diesel Electronics by BMW), which increased the torque output by 10 N⋅m (7 lb⋅ft). The updated engine has a smaller turbocharger, which improves response. This also marked the introduction of the turbodiesel to the smaller 3-series (E30). The naturally aspirated engine was fitted with ESC from 1989.

== Models ==
Engine	Aspiration	Power	Torque	Redline	Dates built
M21D24	Turbo-diesel	85 kW (115 PS; 113 hp) at 4800 rpm	210 N⋅m (155 lb⋅ft) at 2400 rpm	5350 rpm	1983.09–1987.08
M21D24	Turbo-diesel	85 kW (115 PS; 113 hp) at 4800 rpm	220 N⋅m (162 lb⋅ft) at 2400 rpm	5350 rpm	1987–1992 (DDE)
M21D24	Natural	63 kW (86 PS; 85 hp) at 4600 rpm	152 N⋅m (112 lb⋅ft) at 2500 rpm	5150 rpm	1985.09–1989; 1989–1992 (DDE)

Applications:

- 1983 - 1988 E28 524td
- 1986 - 1988 E28 524d (naturally aspirated)
- 1985 - 1993 E30 324d (naturally aspirated)
- 1987 - 1993 E30 324td
- 1988 - 1991 E34 524td
- 1984 - 1985 Continental Mark VII
- 1984 - 1985 Lincoln Continental
- 1986 - 1987 Vixen 21 TD and Vixen 21 XC
- 1989 - 1991 Bertone Freeclimber
- 1992 UMM Alter II (four examples built)

== See also ==
- List of BMW engines

== Bibliography ==
- Lange, K.; Göschel, B.; Henning, R.; Krame, F. (1982). "M 105 — A New Turbocharged IDI Diesel Engine". SAE Technical Paper Series. SAE Technical Paper Series 820114. Vol. 1. doi:10.4271/820114.
