= Dubai Plus =

- Type: Privileges Card\Program: payment, Transportation, Discounts, Deals, Loyalty
- Inventor: National Plus
- Inception: 2015
- Manufacturer: DED, DGHR, National Plus, VISA, Network International
- Available: current
- Models: Government \ Semi-Government Employees
- Website: www.dubaiplus.com

Dubai Plus is a city smart card program for government and semi-government employees in Dubai. It was announced on May 12, 2015, by the Department of Economic Development (DED) in Dubai and the Dubai Government Human Resources Department (DGHR) together with National Plus and Network International, a payment service provider.

== Launch ==
Dubai Plus was launched by Ali Ibrahim, Deputy Director General of DED; Mohammad Bin Markhan AlKetbi, managing director of National Plus; Bhairav Trivedi, CEO of Network International, and Samer Soliman, Executive Vice President - Network International, during the ‘Cards & Payments Middle East 2015’ exhibition, which opened on 12 May 2015.

== Purpose ==
Dubai Plus is designed to improve the Dubai Happiness Index, launched by Shaikh Mohammed bin Rashid Al Maktoum.

== Services ==
Dubai Plus program is a smart card with a security feature for card holders. The card holders can use the card on all Network International enabled point of sale (POS) terminals in Dubai, can make purchases using ITS electronic wallet, can pay for RTA (Dubai Roads and Transport Authority) services and get promotions from registered merchants.

The card aims to reduce the carbon footprint of retail transactions, as consumers are being reached through a digital medium as opposed to previously used print advertising.

== Awards ==
Dubai Plus won an award for being one of the first city privilege cards.
