= BMW M41 =

BMW M41 engine

Overview
- Manufacturer: BMW
- Production: 1994–2000

Layout
- Configuration: Straight-4
- Displacement: 1,665 cc (101.6 cu in)
- Cylinder bore: 80 mm (3.15 in)
- Piston stroke: 82.8 mm (3.26 in)

RPM range
- Max. engine speed: 4,800

Combustion
- Fuel system: Indirect injection
- Fuel type: Diesel fuel (DIN EN 590)
- Cooling system: Water-cooled

Output
- Power output: 66 kW (89 hp)
- Torque output: 190 N⋅m (140 lb⋅ft)

Chronology
- Predecessor: BMW M51
- Successor: BMW M47

The BMW M41 was a straight-4 turbocharged indirect injection diesel engine produced from 1994 through 2000.

== M41D17 ==
The M41 engine was the first four-cylinder diesel engine from BMW.

The engine was derived from the six-cylinder BMW M51 engine and shared 86% of its components.

This engine became available in several models of the E36:

- 4-door sedan
- 5-door touring
- 3-door compact

Fuel consumption is around 6.5 L/100 km (43 mpg_{‑imp}; 36 mpg_{‑US}) in combined use (EUR) in the 318tds 4-door sedan version.

Models
Engine	Power	Torque	Year
M41D17	66 kW (89 hp) at 4,400 rpm	190 N⋅m (140 lb⋅ft) at 2,000 rpm	1994-2000

Applications:

- 1994-2000 E36 318tds

== See also ==
- List of BMW engines
