= BMW M44 =

BMW M44 engine
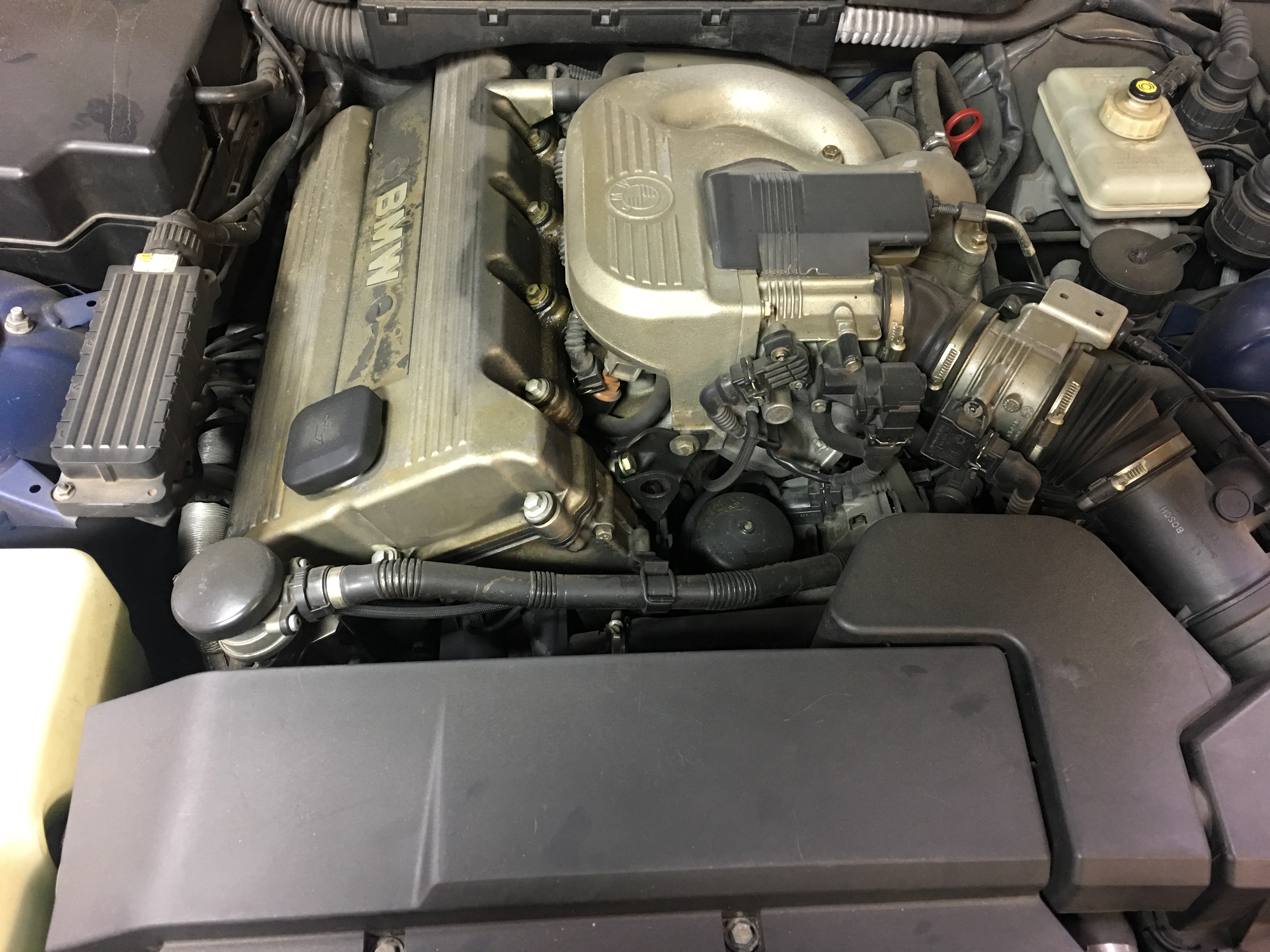

Overview
- Production: 1996–2000

Layout
- Configuration: Inline-4
- Displacement: 1.9 L (1,895 cc)
- Cylinder bore: 85 mm (3.35 in)
- Piston stroke: 83.5 mm (3.29 in)
- Cylinder block material: Cast iron
- Cylinder head material: Aluminium
- Valvetrain: DOHC, 16V

Combustion
- Fuel type: Petrol

Chronology
- Predecessor: BMW M42
- Successor: BMW N42

The BMW M44 is a dual overhead camshaft sixteen valve four-cylinder petrol engine which was the replacement for BMW M42 and was produced from 1996 to 2000 at the Steyr factory. It was produced alongside the BMW M43 SOHC 8V four-cylinder engine, with the M44 being the higher power engine model. In 2000, the M44 was replaced by the BMW N42 engine.

== Design ==
Compared with the M42, the M44 has roller rocker arms, a hot-wire MAF, displacement increased from 1.8 to 1.9 L (110 to 116 cu in) and other detail changes such as a grey cast iron crankshaft replacing the forged steel item from the previous M42. As per the final versions of the M42, the M44 has a dual length intake manifold ("DISA"). Peak power is the same as the M42, however mid-range power is increased significantly and peak torque is increased by 5 N⋅m (4 lb⋅ft) at 200 rpm lower. There was also a 70% reduction in valve train friction which contributed to the engine being more quiet and fuel efficient than its predecessor.

The M44 has a cast iron block and aluminium cylinder head, as per its predecessor and the roller rockers are lubricated by an oil feed system in the rocker cover - this is fed by an oil gallery in the cylinder head and a sealing O ring between the two. The M42's metal cooling system feed on the inlet side of the cylinder head was replaced by an M43 style plastic outlet bolted to the rear cylinder head face - these can leak with old age and should be replaced periodically.

== Versions ==
Version	Displacement	Power	Torque	Years
M44B19	1,895 cc (115.6 cu in)	103 kW (138 bhp) at 6,000 rpm	180 N⋅m (133 lb⋅ft) at 4,300 rpm	1996–2000

=== M44B19 ===
The M44B19 has a displacement of 1,895 cc (115.6 cu in), which is achieved through a bore of 85.0 mm (3.35 in) and a stroke of 83.5 mm (3.29 in). A compression ratio of 10.0:1 is used, along with the Bosch Motronic 5.2 engine management system.

The crankshaft has an increased stroke from the M42's 81 mm (3.19 in) and is cast instead of forged. Also revised were the valve actuators which are of a roller pivoting arm type.

Applications:

- 1996-2000 E36 318i (North America only), 318is and 318ti
- 1996-1999 Z3 1.9

With time this engine was replaced by BMW N42 engine.

== See also ==
- BMW
- List of BMW engines
