= BMW 3 Series (E36) =

Third generation of BMW 3 Series

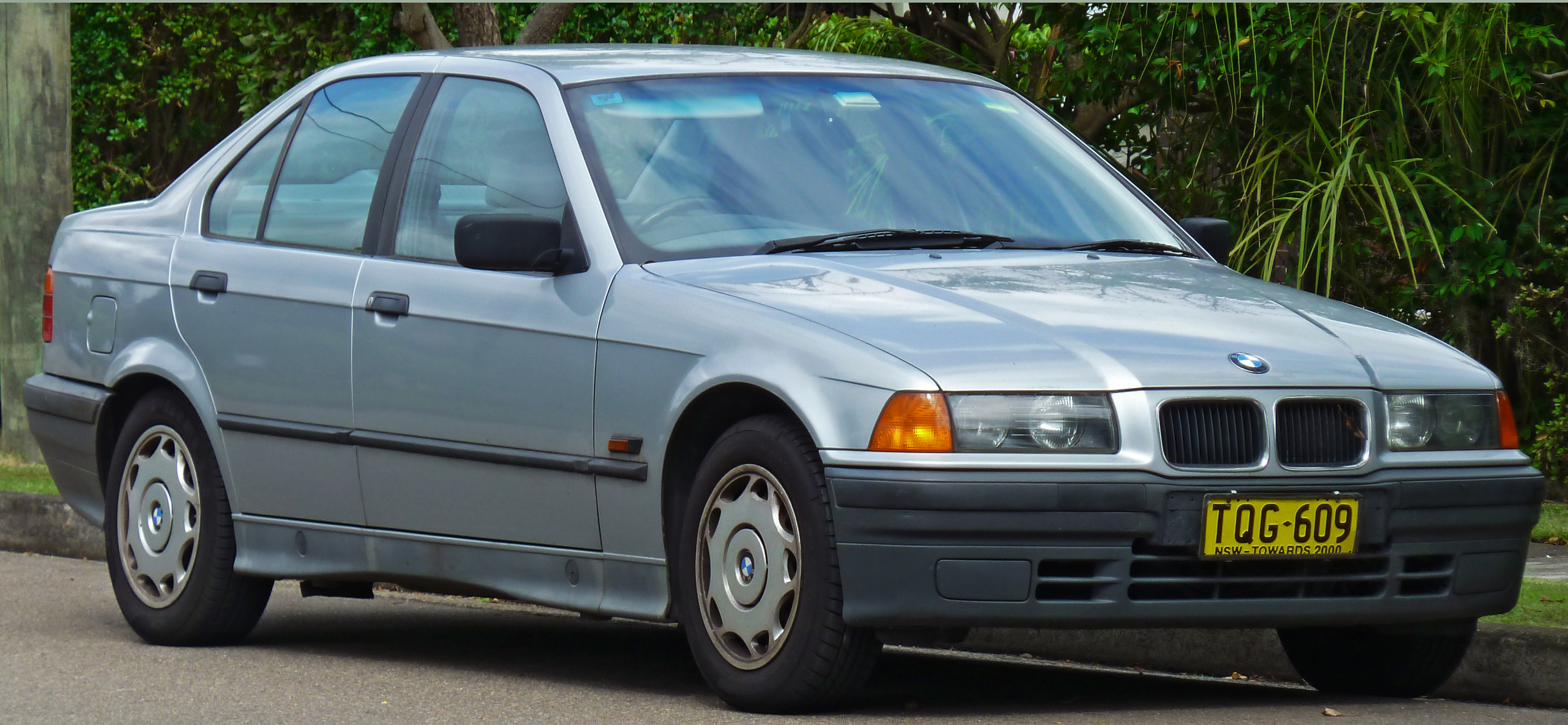
- BMW 318i sedan (Australia)

Overview
- Manufacturer: BMW
- Model code: E36
- Production: 1990–2000
- Assembly: Germany: Munich; Regensburg; South Africa: Rosslyn (BMW SA); United States: Greer, South Carolina (Plant Spartanburg); Mexico: Toluca (BMW Mexico); Indonesia: Jakarta (Gaya Motor); Egypt: 6th of October City (BAG); Philippines: Santa Rosa (Asian Carmakers Corporation)
- Designer: Claus Luthe, Pinky Lai, Boyke Boyer

Body and chassis
- Class: Compact executive car (D)
- Body style: 2-door coupé; 2-door convertible; 3-door hatchback; 4-door saloon; 5-door wagon
- Layout: Front-engine, rear-wheel-drive
- Related: BMW M3 (E36); BMW 3 Series Compact (E36/5); BMW Z3

Powertrain
- Engine: Petrol: 1.6–1.9 L M40/M42/M43/M44 I4; 2.0–3.2 L M50/M52/S50/S52 I6; Diesel: 1.7 L M41 I4; 2.5 L M51 I6
- Transmission: 5-speed manual; 6-speed manual; 4-speed 4L30-E automatic; 5-speed ZF 5HP automatic

Dimensions
- Wheelbase: 2,700 mm (106.3 in)
- Length: 4,433 mm (174.5 in)
- Width: 1,710 mm (67.3 in)
- Height: 1,366–1,390 mm (53.8–54.7 in)
- Curb weight: 1,175–1,635 kg (2,590–3,605 lb)

Chronology
- Predecessor: BMW 3 Series (E30)
- Successor: BMW 3 Series (E46)

The third generation of the BMW 3 Series range of compact executive cars is designated under the model code E36, and was produced by the German automaker BMW from 1990 to 2000. The initial models were four-door saloons, followed by coupés, convertibles, wagons ("Touring"), and eventually hatchbacks ("Compact").

The E36 was the first 3 Series to be offered in a hatchback body style. It was also the first 3 Series to be available with a six-speed manual transmission (in the 1996 M3), a five-speed automatic transmission, and a four-cylinder diesel engine. The multi-link rear suspension was also a significant upgrade as compared to the previous generations of the 3 Series. All-wheel drive was not available for the E36, unlike the previous (E30) and successive (E46) generations.

The E36 was named in Car and Driver magazine's 10Best list for every year it was on sale.

Following the introduction of its successor, the E46 3 Series in 1998, the E36 began to be phased out and was eventually replaced in 1999.

== Development and launch ==
Development of the E36 began in 1981 and the exterior design was heavily influenced by aerodynamics, specifically the overall wedge shape, headlight covers and smaller wing mirrors. The lead designers were Pinky Lai and Boyke Boyer.

The production version of the E36 was launched in October 1990, with press release in November and market launch in early 1991. The Touring (E36/3) did not go on sale until March 1995, with the Touring version of the previous generation having remained on sale until April 1994 alongside the E36 saloons and coupés. At first, the Touring was only offered in 320i and 328i versions; in July 1995 the 318 tds Touring arrived, followed by the 318i in September.

== Body styles ==
The body styles of the range are:

- 4-door saloon, produced from 1990 to 1998.
- 2-door coupé, produced from 1990 to 1999.
- 2-door convertible, produced from 1993 to 1999. A 4-door Baur "Top Cabriolet" (TC4) conversion was also available.
- 5-door wagon (marketed as "Touring"), produced from November 1994 to 1999. 105,606 examples were built.
- 3-door hatchback (see BMW 3 Series Compact), produced from 1994 to 2000.
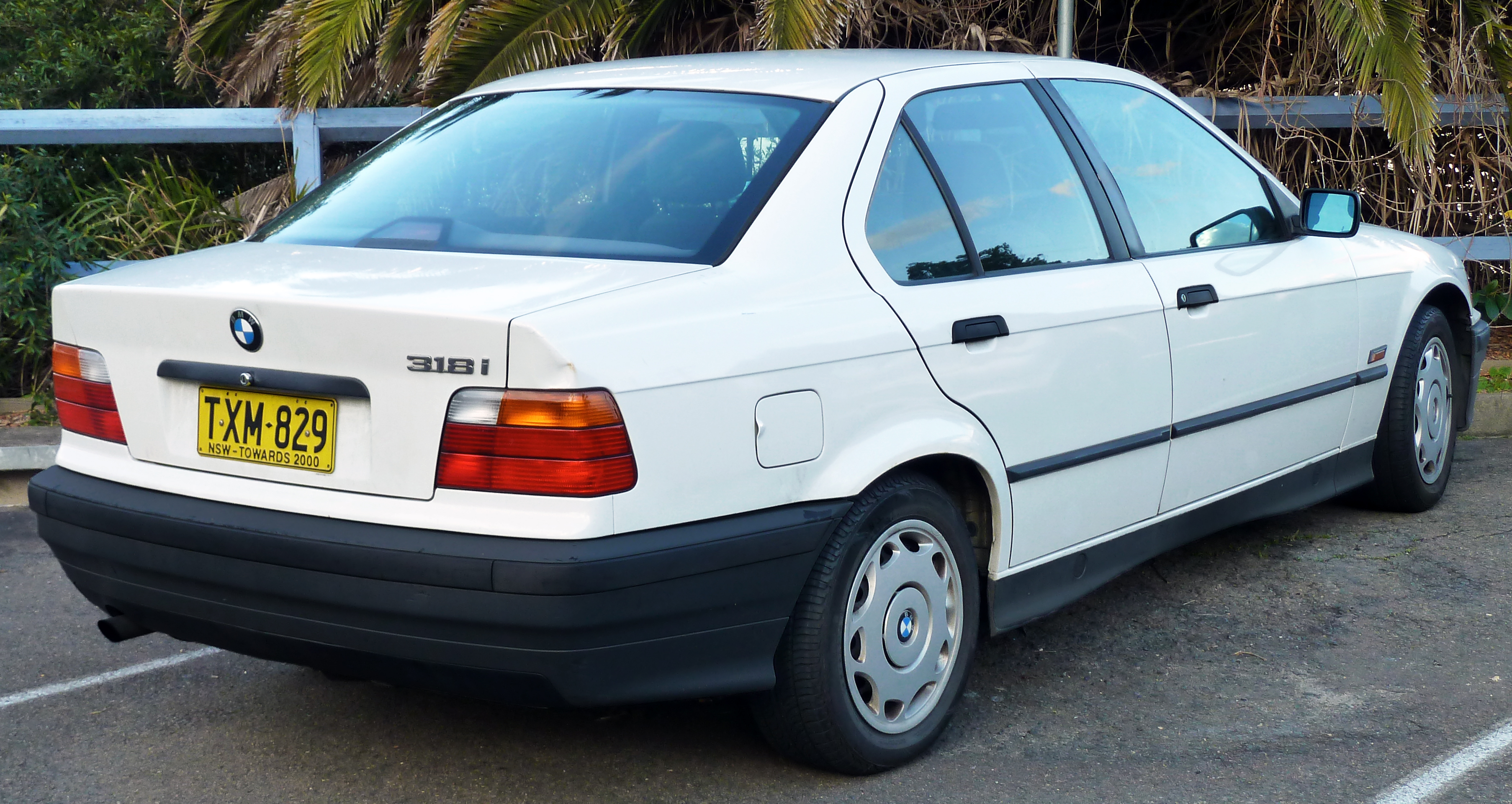
BMW 318i (E36 saloon, Australia)

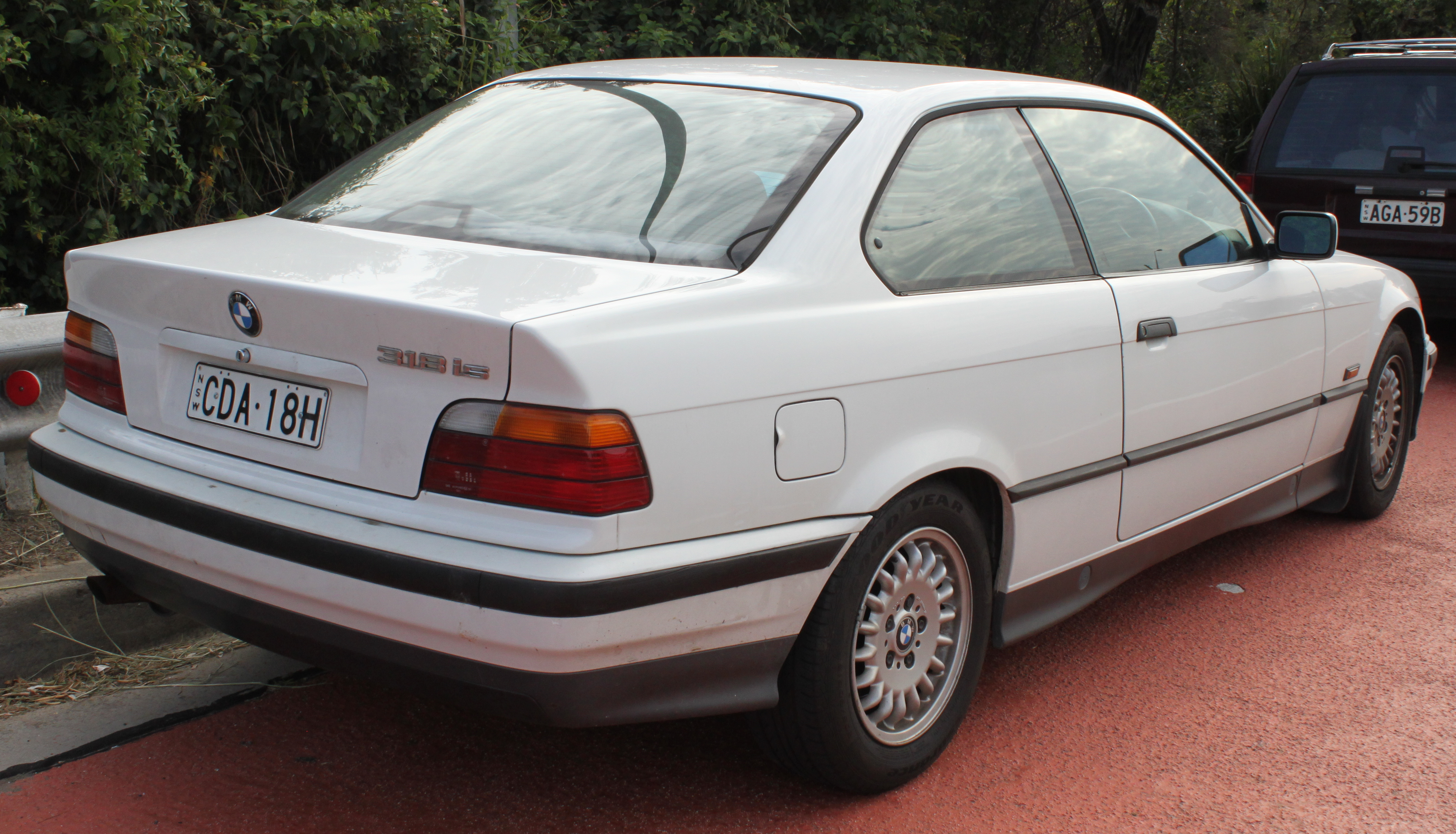
BMW 318iS (E36 coupe, Australia)

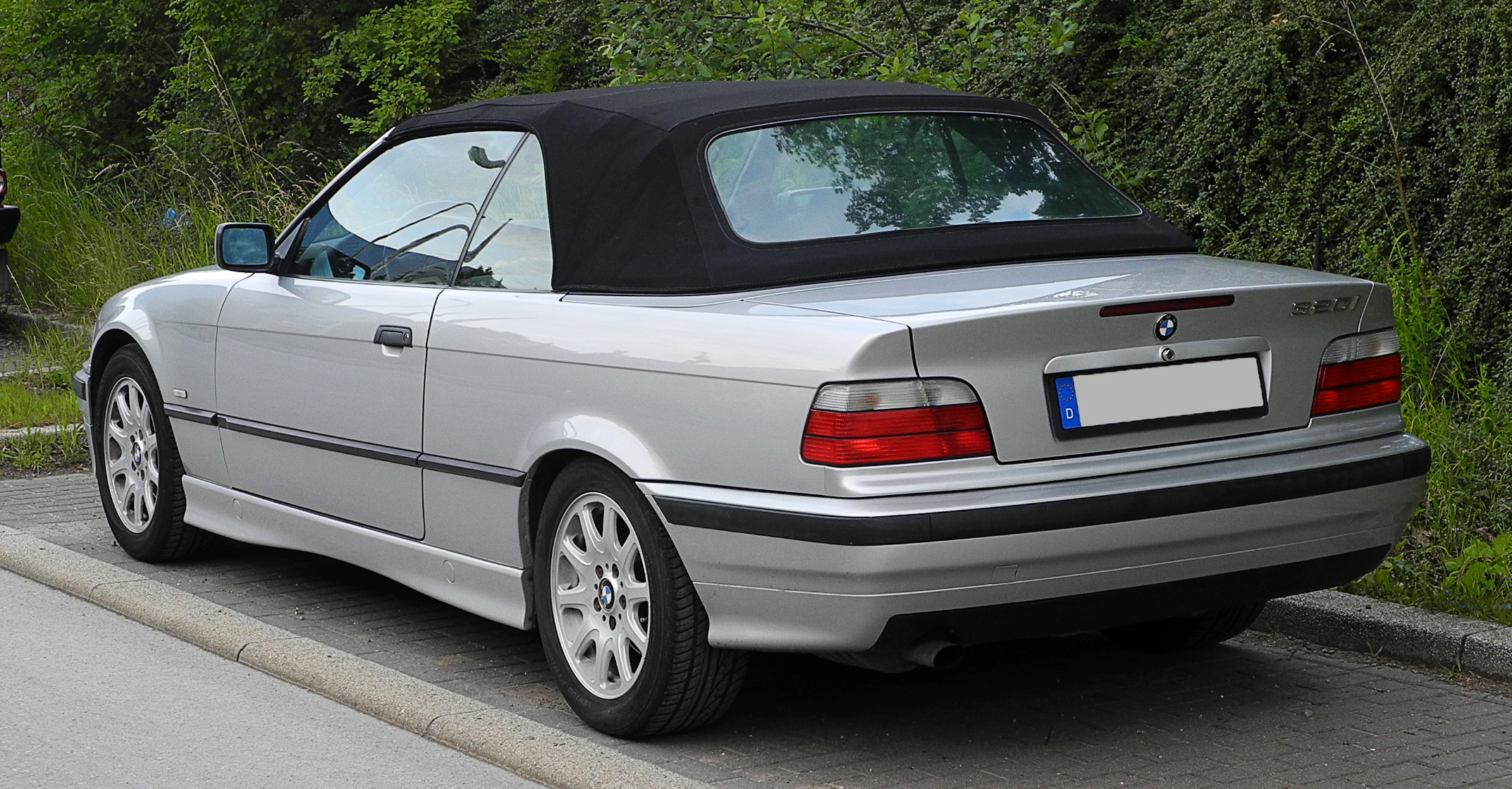
BMW 320i (E36 convertible, Germany)

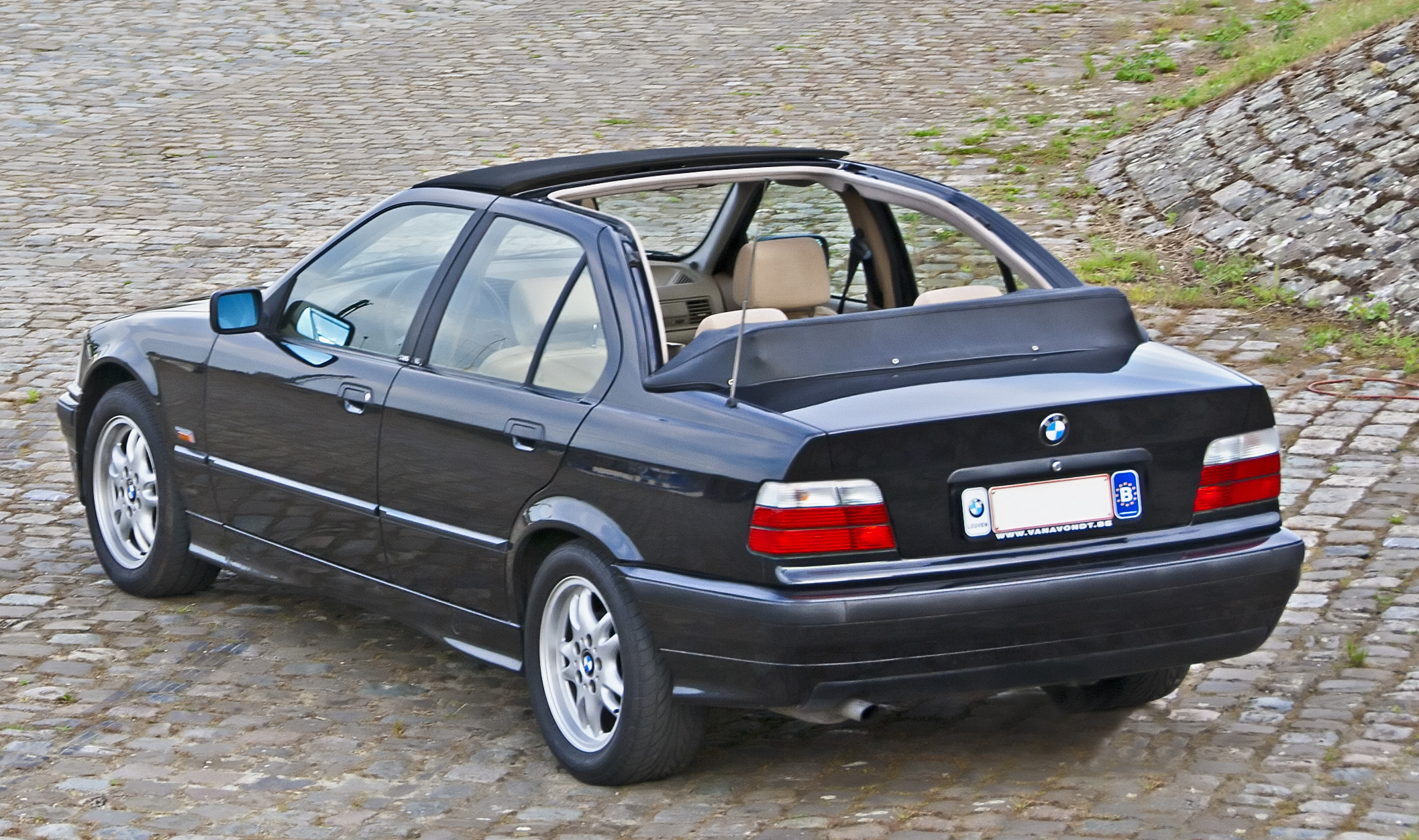
E36 Baur Top Cabriolet

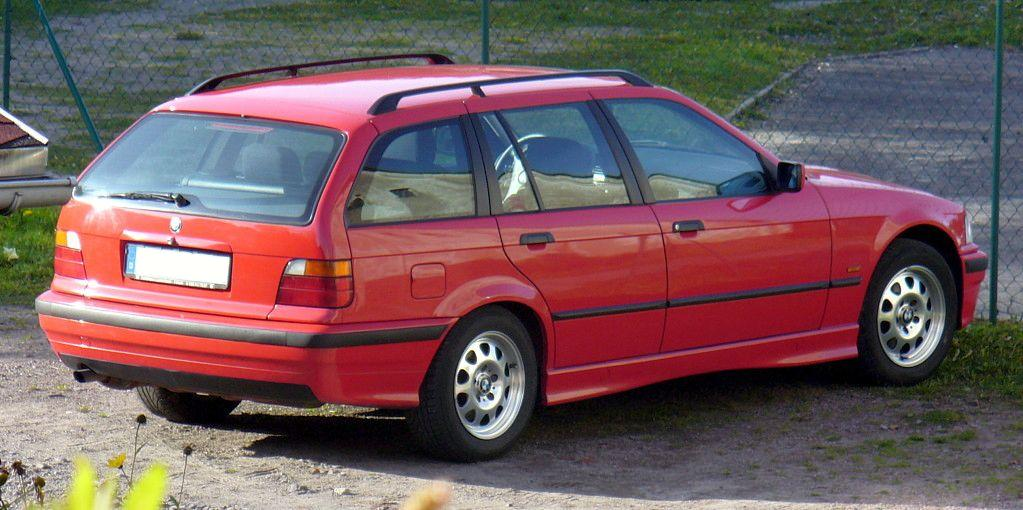
E36 Touring

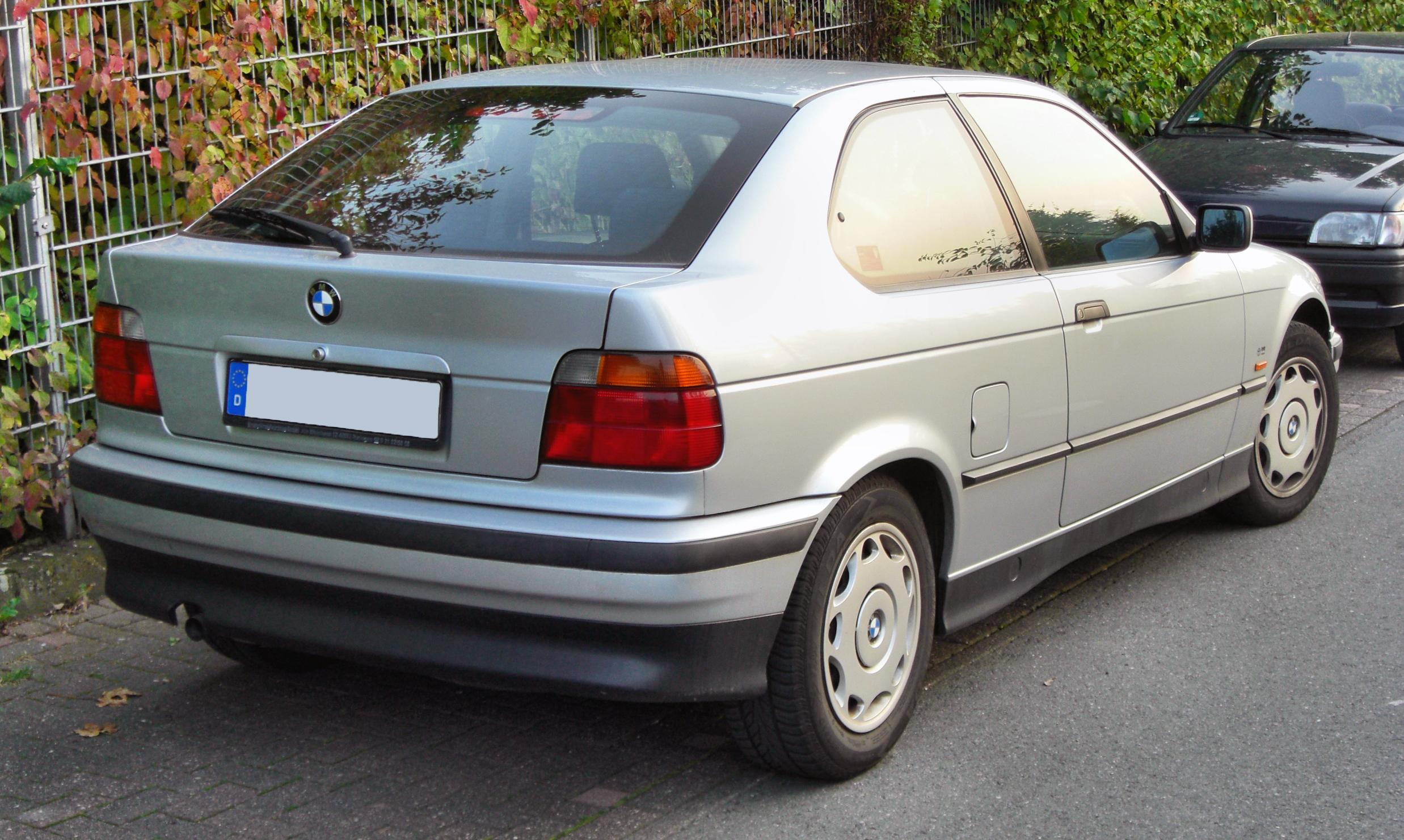
E36 Compact

== Design ==
All models are rear-wheel drive since the E36 was not produced with all-wheel drive (unlike its predecessor and successor). The E36 chassis was all new, using the "Z-axle" multilink suspension proven in the 1989 BMW Z1, and designed with rear toe-in to minimize the oversteering characteristics of the preceding generation. Unlike the other body styles, the hatchback (known as the "E36/5" or "BMW Compact") used a rear semi-trailing arm suspension based on the older E30 instead, in order to save space due to its truncated rear end.

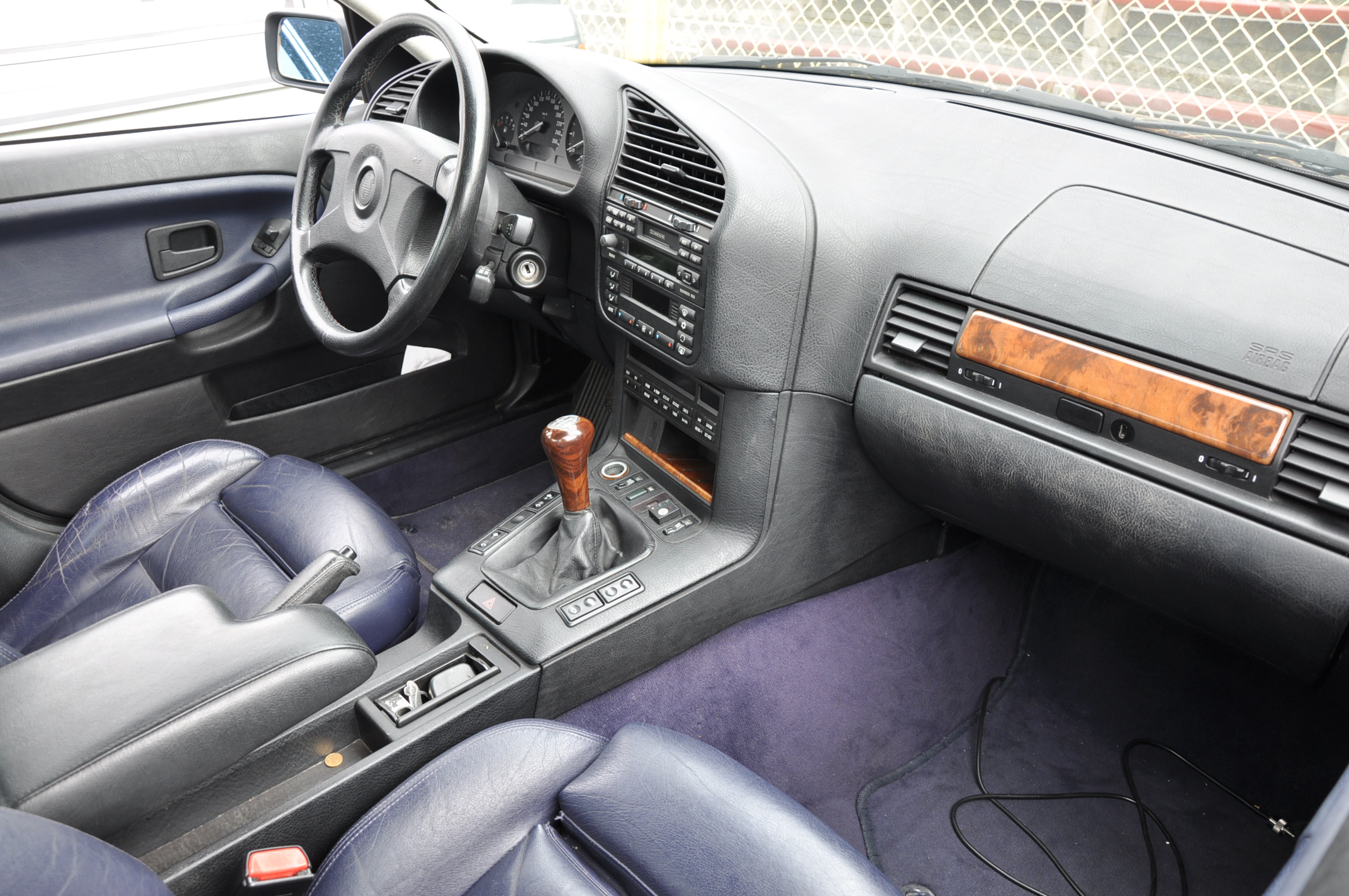
Interior

The E36 was produced with the following transmissions:

- 5-speed manual (1996–1999 M3 U.S) ZF S5D320Z
- 5-speed manual (1994–1995 M3) ZF S5D310Z
- 6-speed manual (1996–1999 M3- except for the United States) Getrag 420g
- 4-speed automatic
- 5-speed automatic

Available safety equipment included a driver's airbag, passenger airbag (from 1993 production) and side impact airbags in later models, ABS braking and stability control ("ASC +T"). The dashboard was designed to accommodate the passenger side airbag from the beginning, which limited the size of the glove compartment. Available in the Saloon and Touring, a rear seat with two integrated children's booster seats was a first for BMW.

Electronic climate control was also available on the E36. In North America, cars equipped with the "Winter Package" also have heated seats and side mirrors.

== Engines ==
=== Petrol ===
The four-cylinder petrol engines used in the E36 range were initially engines carried over from the previous generation 3 Series: the BMW M40 SOHC engine and the BMW M42 DOHC engine. In 1993, the M40 was replaced by the BMW M43 SOHC engine and the M42 was replaced in 1996 by the BMW M44 DOHC engine. To retain a 50/50 weight distribution (on petrol models), versions fitted with the heavier, six-cylinder engines had the battery relocated to the trunk.

For the six-cylinder models, the E36 was launched with the then-new BMW M50 DOHC petrol engine. In late 1992 the M50TU versions added single-VANOS (variable valve timing), which increased torque (peak power was unchanged). In 1995, the BMW M52 engine replaced the M50TU, resulting in the 328i model replacing the 325i and the addition of a new mid-range 323i model (powered by a 2.5 litre version of the M52).

In 1992, the 3.0 L BMW S50 engine debuted in the E36 M3. In 1995, its capacity was increased to 3.2 L.

Model	Years	Engine		Power	Torque	Notes
316i	1990–1994	M40B16 4-cylinder	1.6 L (1,596 cc)	73 kW (100 hp) at 5,500 rpm	141 N⋅m (104 lb⋅ft) at 4,250 rpm	
316i	1993–1999	M43B16 4-cylinder	1.6 L (1,596 cc)	75 kW (102 hp) at 5,500 rpm	150 N⋅m (111 lb⋅ft) at 3,900 rpm	
318i/318ti	1990–1993*	M40B18 4-cylinder	1.8 L (1,796 cc)	83 kW (113 hp) at 5,500 rpm	162 N⋅m (119 lb⋅ft) at 4,250 rpm	316i in South Africa
318i/318ti	1993–1998	M43B18 4-cylinder	1.8 L (1,796 cc)	85 kW (115 hp) at 5,500 rpm	168 N⋅m (124 lb⋅ft) at 3,900 rpm	
318is/318ti	1992–1995	M42B18 4-cylinder	1.8 L (1,796 cc)	103 kW (140 hp) at 6,000 rpm	175 N⋅m (129 lb⋅ft) at 4,500 rpm	318i in North America
318is/318ti	1996–1998	M44B19 4-cylinder	1.9 L (1,895 cc)	103 kW (140 hp) at 6,000 rpm	181 N⋅m (133 lb⋅ft) at 4,300 rpm	318i in North America
320i	1991–1993	M50B20 6-cylinder	2.0 L (1,991 cc)	110 kW (150 hp) at 5,900 rpm	190 N⋅m (140 lb⋅ft) at 4,700 rpm	
320i	1993–1998	M52B20 6-cylinder	2.0 L (1,991 cc)	110 kW (150 hp) at 5,900 rpm	190 N⋅m (140 lb⋅ft) at 4,200 rpm	
323i/323ti	1995–1998	M52B25 6-cylinder	2.5 L (2,494 cc)	125 kW (170 hp) at 5,500 rpm	245 N⋅m (181 lb⋅ft) at 3,950 rpm	
325i	1991–1992	M50B25 6-cylinder	2.5 L (2,494 cc)	141 kW (192 hp) at 5,900 rpm	245 N⋅m (181 lb⋅ft) at 4,700 rpm	
325i	1993–1995	M50B25TÜ 6-cylinder	2.5 L (2,494 cc)	141 kW (192 hp) at 5,900 rpm	245 N⋅m (181 lb⋅ft) at 4,200 rpm	Coupé sold as 325is in US
328i	1995–1998	M52B28 6-cylinder	2.8 L (2,793 cc)	142 kW (193 hp) at 5,500 rpm	280 N⋅m (207 lb⋅ft) at 3,950 rpm	Coupé sold as 328is in US
M3	1992–1995	S50B30 6-cylinder	3.0 L (2,990 cc)	210 kW (286 hp) at 7,000 rpm	320 N⋅m (236 lb⋅ft) at 3,600 rpm	Euro-spec
M3	1995–1998	S50B32 6-cylinder	3.2 L (3,201 cc)	236 kW (321 hp) at 7,400 rpm	350 N⋅m (258 lb⋅ft) at 3,250 rpm	Euro-spec
M3	1995	S50B30US 6-cylinder	3.0 L (2,990 cc)	179 kW (240 hp) at 6,000 rpm	305 N⋅m (225 lb⋅ft) at 4,250 rpm	US-spec
M3	1996–1999	S52B32 6-cylinder	3.2 L (3,152 cc)	179 kW (240 hp) at 6,000 rpm	320 N⋅m (236 lb⋅ft) at 3,800 rpm	US-spec

=== Diesel ===
Model	Years	Engine		Power	Torque
318tds	1994–2000	M41D17 4-cylinder	1.7 L (1,665 cc)	66 kW (90 hp) at 4,400 rpm	190 N⋅m (140 lb⋅ft) at 1,900 rpm
325td	1991–1996	M51D25 UL 6-cylinder	2.5 L (2,497 cc)	85 kW (115 hp) at 4,400 rpm	222 N⋅m (164 lb⋅ft) at 2,000 rpm
325td	1996–1998	M51D25TÜ UL 6-cylinder	2.5 L (2,497 cc)	85 kW (115 hp) at 4,800 rpm	230 N⋅m (170 lb⋅ft) at 2,000 rpm
325tds	1993–1996	M51D25 OL 6-cylinder	2.5 L (2,497 cc)	105 kW (143 hp) at 4,800 rpm	260 N⋅m (192 lb⋅ft) at 2,200 rpm
325tds	1996–1998	M51D25TÜ OL 6-cylinder	2.5 L (2,497 cc)	105 kW (143 hp) at 4,600 rpm	280 N⋅m (207 lb⋅ft) at 2,200 rpm

Initially, the turbocharged straight-six BMW M51 engine was used in the E36 325td model. In 1993, the 325tds model was released, which added an intercooler to the M51. In 1994, the 318tds model was introduced, powered by the four-cylinder BMW M41 turbocharged and intercooled engine. Diesel engines were only available in saloon, touring and compact body styles. The coupe and convertible only had petrol engines.

== M3 model ==
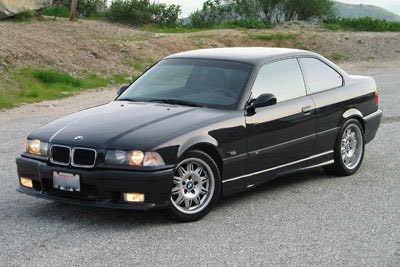
M3 coupe

The E36 M3 was launched in 1992 and was powered by the BMW S50 and BMW S52 straight-six engines rather than the four-cylinder units used in the E30. Unlike the predecessor, it was no longer a homologation special and was not developed expressly with competition in mind. It was produced in coupé, saloon, and convertible body styles.

== Alpina models ==
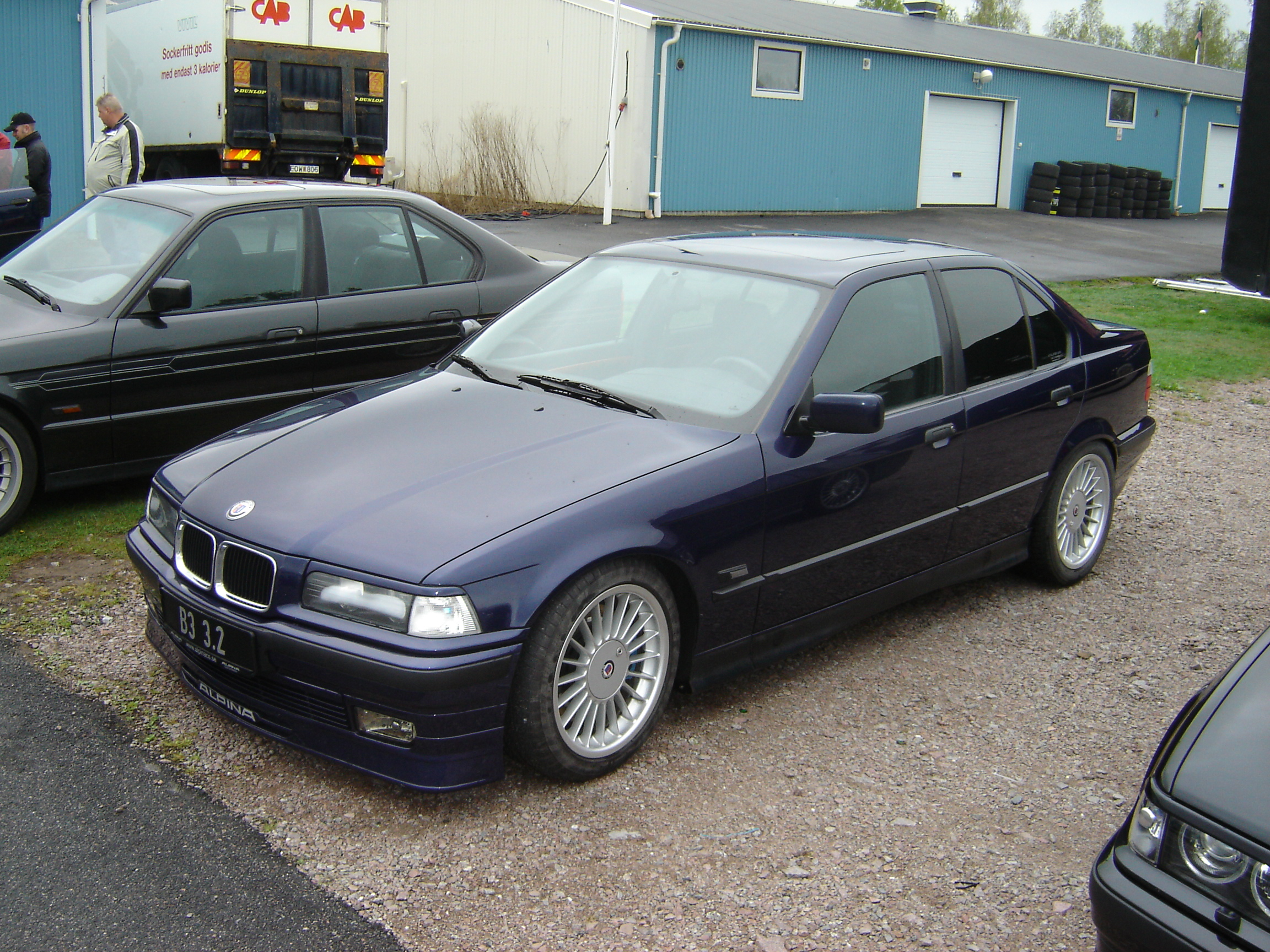
Alpina B3 3.2

E36-based Alpina production began in 1991 with the release of the Alpina B6 2.8/2, with an upgraded M50-derived engine. A Japanese market exclusive B6 2.8/2 wagon was produced between 1996 and 1998.

In 1993, the 2.8/2 was replaced by the B6 3.0, following the introduction of the 3 litre S50 engine that was used in the new M3 models. Alpina models were now offered in convertible and touring form as well, rather than just in coupe and saloon models. Again in 1996, Alpina introduced the B3 3.2, following the S50 engine's upgrade to 3.2 litres. With the new 3.2 models, Alpinas were now based on the 328i and its 2.8L engine, rather than 325i models.

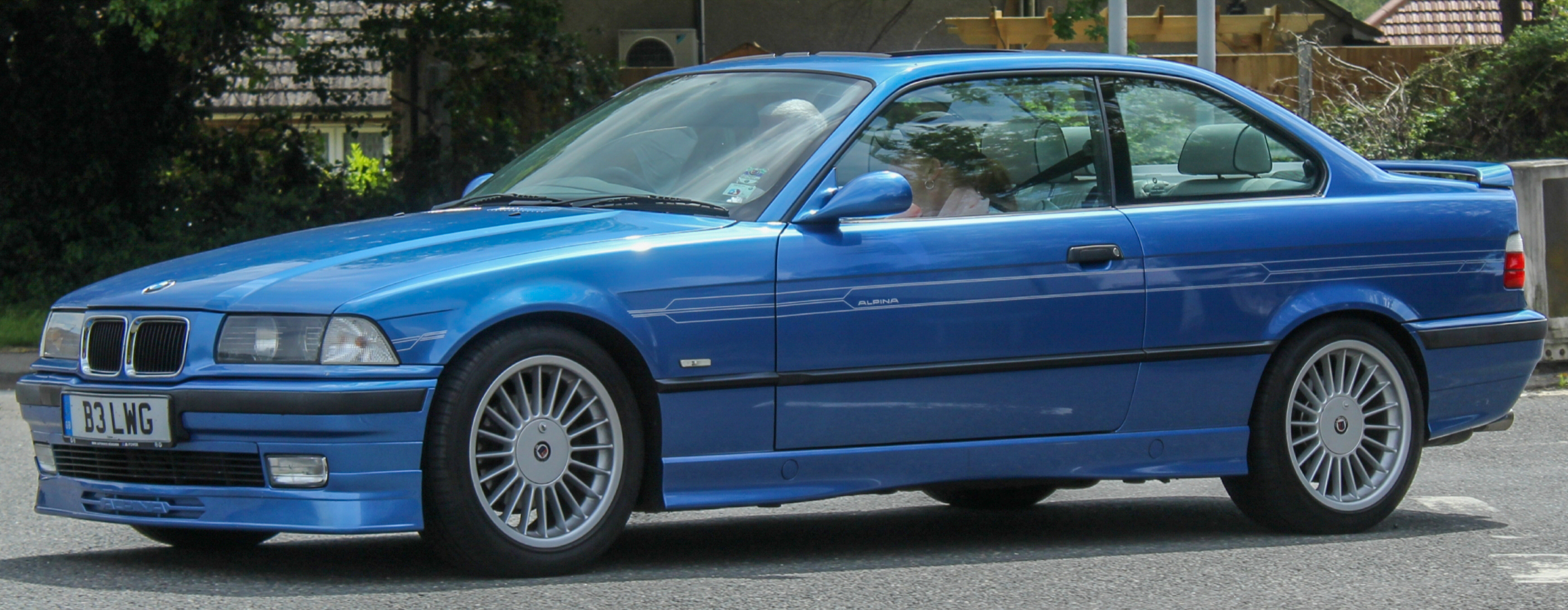
Alpina B3 3.2

In 1995, the B8 was released. The B8 4.6 was based on the 4 litre V8 from the E34 5-series, put into a 328i-based shell. BMW V8s had coated bores which meant new blocks had to be cast by BMW specifically for Alpina V8s. Fitting the V8 into the engine bay required numerous adjustments to both the body and engine parts; and even then, it was still a tight fit. The B8 4.6 produced a claimed 333 horsepower and 470 Nm of torque. Production of the B8 4.6 ended in late 1998.

For a short time, Alpina produced the B8 4.0, making 313 horsepower and 410 Nm of torque. Only an estimated 5 models are known to exist, and they were all sold in Japan.

All Alpina models featured Alpina's distinctive 20 spoke rims, as well as optional striping. Alpina models also had special aerodynamic pieces, including an Alpina-branded front lip and rear spoiler. Changes to the interior were also present in Alpina models, including new blue instrument panels, wooden trim, new seats and steering wheel.

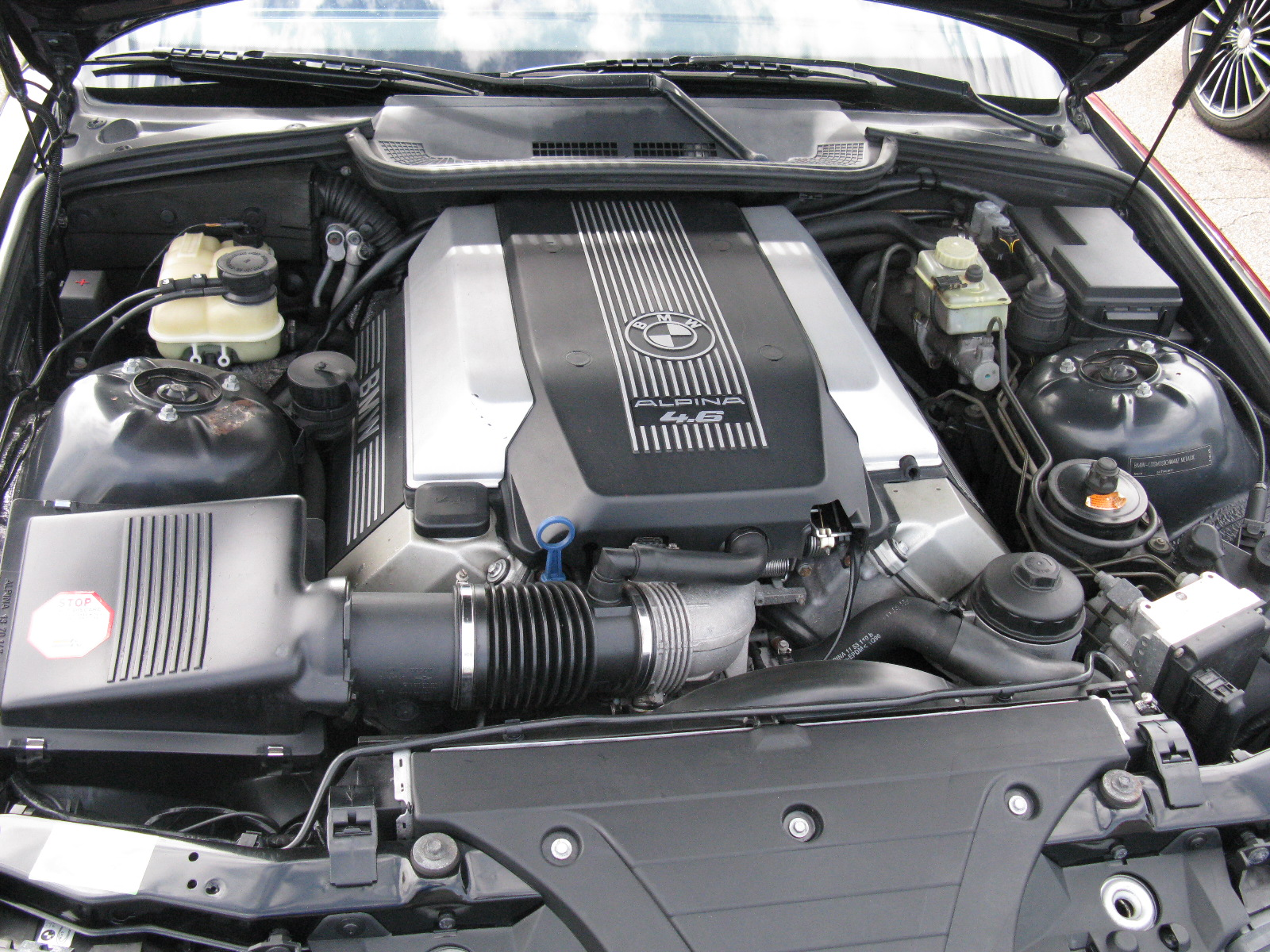
The 4.6L Alpina B8 engine.

== E36/5 Compact ==
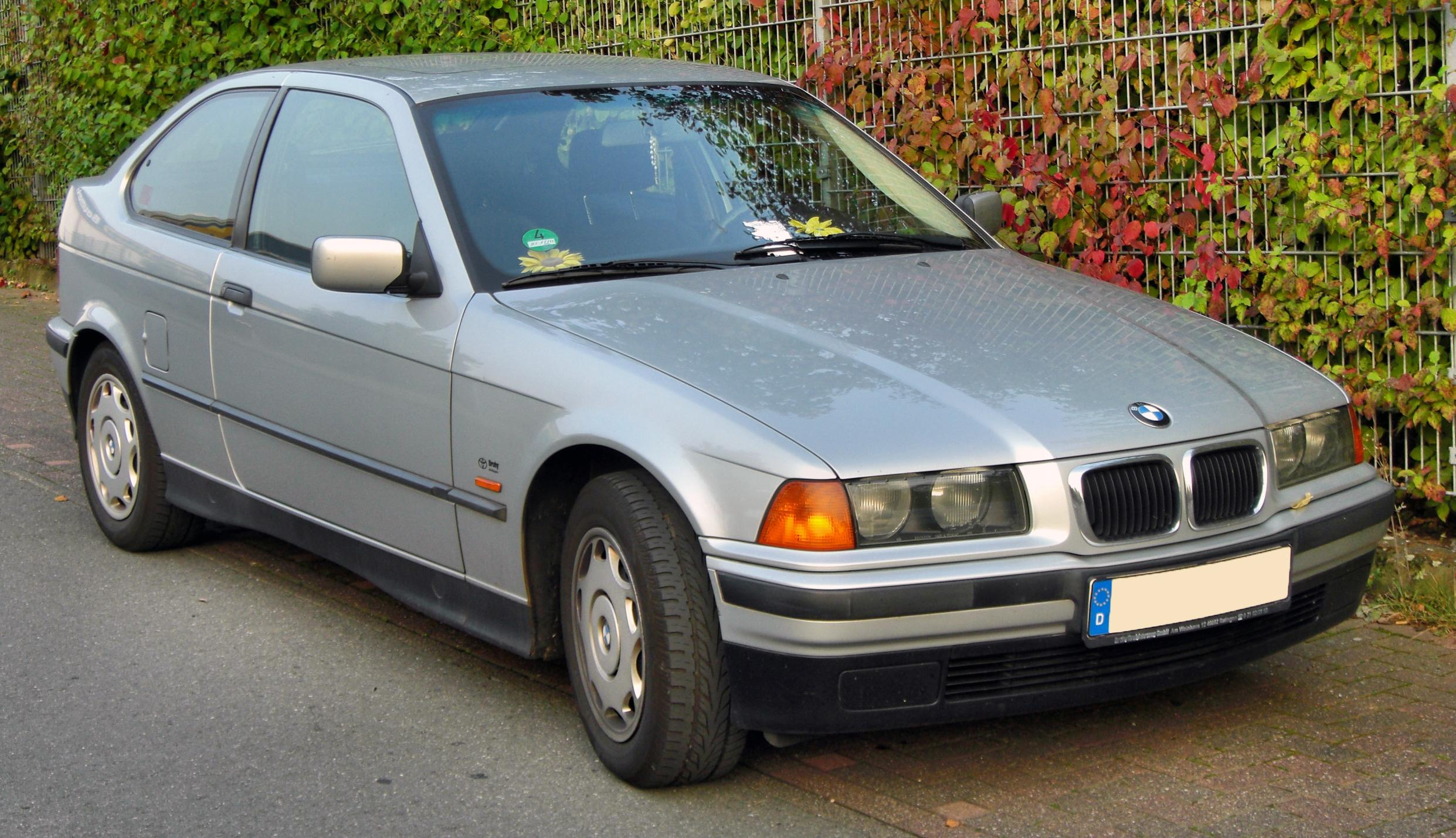
3 Series Compact

The 3 Series Compact range of three-door hatchback models was introduced in 1993, based on a shortened version of the E36 platform. The model code for the hatchback body style is "E36/5" and the model range consisted of 316i, 316g, 318ti, 323ti, and 318tds.

== Z3 Roadster/Coupé ==
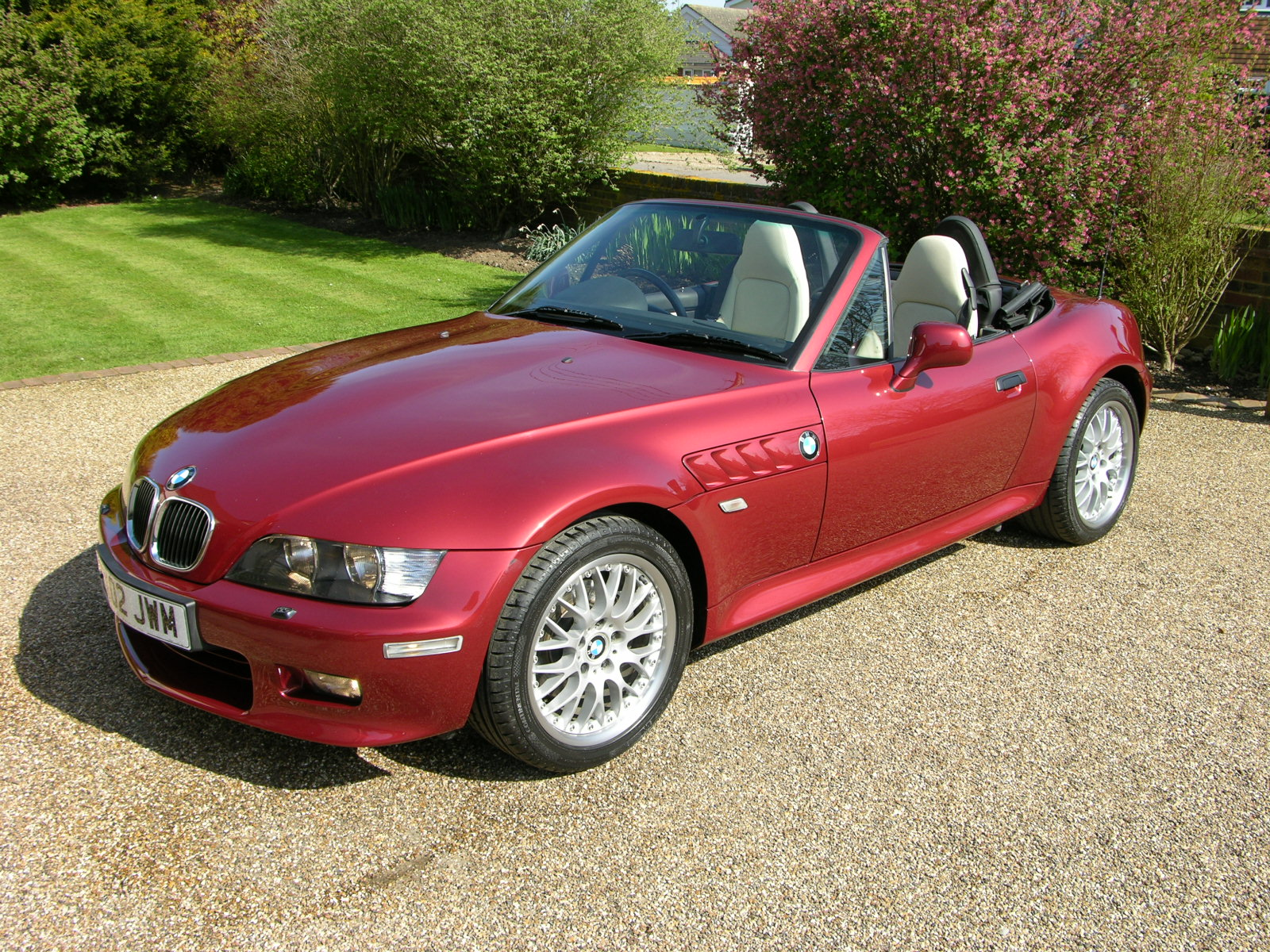
2002 BMW Z3 3.0i

A modified version of the E36 platform was used for the 1996–2002 Z3 roadster (model code E36/7) and coupé (model code E36/8).

== Georgia State Patrol use ==
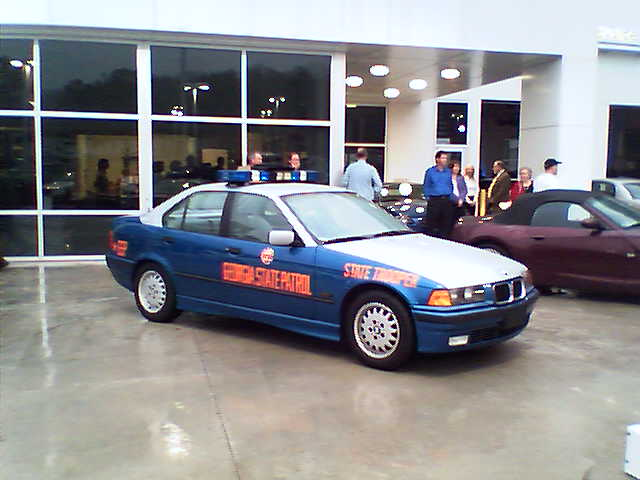
Georgia State Patrol BMW E36, used during the 1996 Summer Olympics torch relay, photographed in 2007

The Georgia State Patrol (GSP) took delivery of three BMW E36 sedans ahead of the 1996 Summer Olympics, held in the state capital Atlanta and with BMW being one of the games' sponsors. The three cars were initially used by the GSP as part of security arrangements for the torch relay across the United States, after which they were deployed on highway patrol duties within Georgia; two of the three were later taken out of service after taking damage in traffic accidents, while one was retained and later restored by the GSP.

== North American model range ==
The North American model range consisted of the models listed below. The 318i models were powered by the BMW M42 engine until 1995, and later the BMW M44 engine which was used in the 318is model sold in other countries. In North America, the "is" suffix was applied to the coupés.

	Saloon	Coupé	Convertible	Compact
318i	1992–1998 (Note: Canada 1993–1998.)	1992–1997 (Note: Canada only for 1999 model year.) (318is)	1994–1997	1995–1999
320i	1993–1995 (Note: Canada only)			
323i		1998–1999 (323is)	1998–1999	
325i	1992–1995	1992–1995 (325is)	1994–1995	
328i	1996–1998	1996–1999 (328is)	1996–1999	
M3	1997–1998	1994–1999 (Note: Canada only for the 1994 model year. US only for 1995 and 1996 model years.)	1998–1999 (Note: US only)	

== European model range ==
The European model range had more variety than the North American and included diesel engines and the station wagon "Touring" body styles. The European market range had more low-range models than the North American, for example, the 316i and 318i had 8-valve SOHC engines. The M3 was also more expensive and had more horsepower than the North American version.

	Saloon	Coupé	Convertible	Touring	Compact
Petrol
316i	1990–1998	1993–1999		1996–1999	1993–2000
316g (Note: Bivalent drive: The 316g can run either on gasoline or compressed natural gas (CNG).)					1995–2000
318i	1990–1998		1993–1999	1995–1999	
318is	1993–1998	1991–1999			
318ti					1994–2000
320i	1990–1998	1991–1998	1992–1999	1994–1999	
323i	1995–1998	1995–1999	1995–1999	1995–1999	
323ti					1997–2000
325i	1990–1995	1990–1995	1992–1995		
328i	1995–1998	1994–1999	1994–1999	1994–1999	
M3 3.0	1994–1995	1992–1995	1993–1995		
M3 3.2	1995–1997	1995–1998	1995–1999		
Diesel
318tds	1994–1998			1994–1999	1994–2000
325td	1991–1998				
325tds	1993–1998			1994–1999	

== Production ==
The E36 was produced in Munich, Germany; Regensburg, Germany; Rosslyn, South Africa; and Spartanburg County, South Carolina, United States.

Local assembly of complete knock-down (CKD) kits was used for cars sold in Uruguay (until 1991), Egypt, Mexico, and Thailand. The E36 was also built as CKD kits in the Philippines starting from 1994 up until 1997, where production halted due to the 1997 Asian financial crisis.

== Motorsports ==
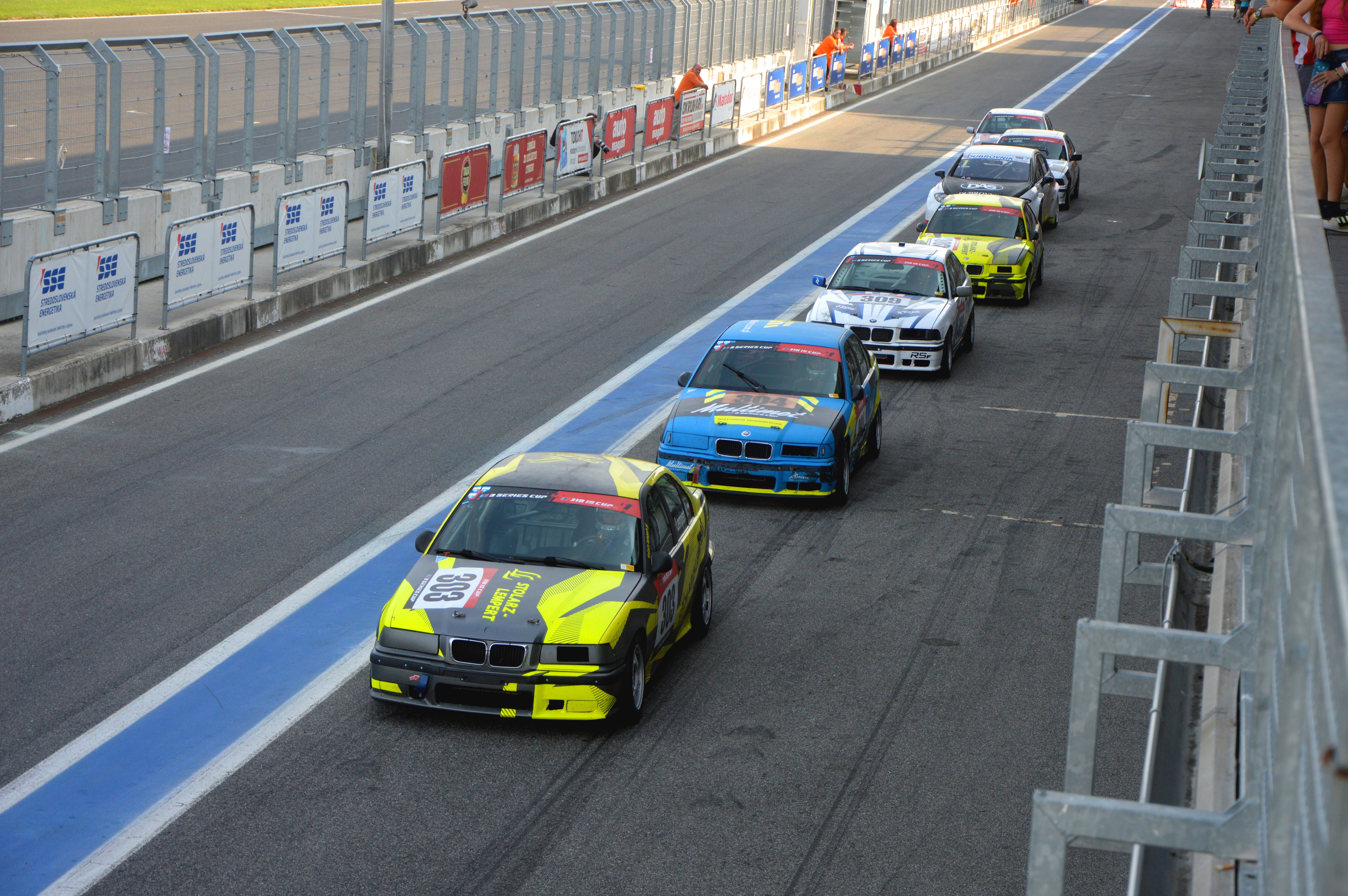
A field of multiple 318is competitors, representing Polish BMW 318is Cup at the 2023 Grand Prix of Slovakia.

Joachim Winkelhock competed in the British Touring Car Championship with the 318i and 320i from 1993 to 1995, winning the title in 1993. In the same year, Johnny Cecotto won the German ADAC GT Cup driving an E36 M3. Cecotto won the Super Tourenwagen Cup for BMW in 1994 and 1998, while Winkelhock won in 1995. Steve Soper won the Japanese Touring Car Championship in 1995 with a works BMW 318i.

Geoff Brabham and his younger brother David Brabham won the 1997 AMP Bathurst 1000 at the Mount Panorama Circuit in Bathurst, Australia driving a Super Touring BMW 320i for BMW Motorsport Australia.

The 1998 24 Hours Nürburgring was won by a diesel-engined car for the first time – a BMW E36 320d, aided by its diesel engine requiring fewer fuel stops than rivals.

In Indonesia, the BMW E36, especially the 320i and 323i models, are popular choices for amateur youth drifting, where they are notably favored for its low price, ease of modifications, and adequate engine performance. Its reputation for drifting also extends to the more professional competitions, alongside the newer E46.
