= Momo (company) =

Italian manufacturer of automobile accessories and parts

Coordinates: 45.455842°N 9.147737°E

MOMO S.r.l
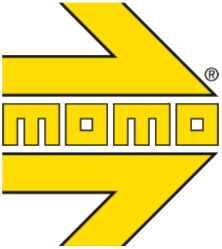
- Type: Private
- Industry: Automotive
- Founded: 1964; 62 years ago
- Founder: Gianpiero Moretti
- Headquarters: Milan, Italy
- Products: Alloy wheels, steering wheels, car seats, gear sticks, tires, decals
- Website: momo.com

MOMO Srl is a design company headquartered in Milan, Italy that makes accessories and parts for automobiles, such as alloy wheels, tires, steering wheels, seats, gear sticks. The company also has a clothing line of products that include racing suits, gloves, and shoes.

== Company history ==
MOMO was founded by gentleman racer Gianpiero Moretti in 1964. 'MOMO' are the initials for Moretti-Monza. Monza is a town in the Province of Monza and Brianza. That year, Moretti produced a racing steering wheel for his own race car. This was the first steering wheel produced by the brand. Compared to the other racing steering wheels available on the market at that time, Momo featured thicker grip, the other racers noticed the convenience of that steering wheel and wanted to obtain the same for their vehicles. So, steering wheels by this brand gained fame throughout the racing community and among the Formula One drivers. So, John Surtees, one of Formula One’s drivers, requested the same steering wheel for his single-seater Ferrari. That same year, he won a Formula One race - the first significant victory of the Momo brand.

In 1969 MOMO opened production plant in Tregnago, Province of Verona. Due to increasing United States federal government safety regulations and the wide adoption of airbags in passenger vehicles internationally, MOMO was sold in 1996 to Breed Technologies, a steering wheel airbag manufacturer. Breed Technologies was acquired by private equity firm Carlyle Group and merged with other OEM automotive businesses they owned to form Key Safety Systems in 2003. Key Safety Systems sold the MOMO brand name to an Italian private equity group in 2006, but most of the manufacturing plants and technologies previously owned by MOMO were retained by Key Safety Systems.

In 2011, MOMO was sold to Henrique Cisneros, a Venezuelan-American businessman part of the Grupo Cisneros and amateur racecar driver.

In 2012, MOMO launched a line of summer, all-season, and winter tires in Europe. The tires have been available in North America since 2017.

== Products ==
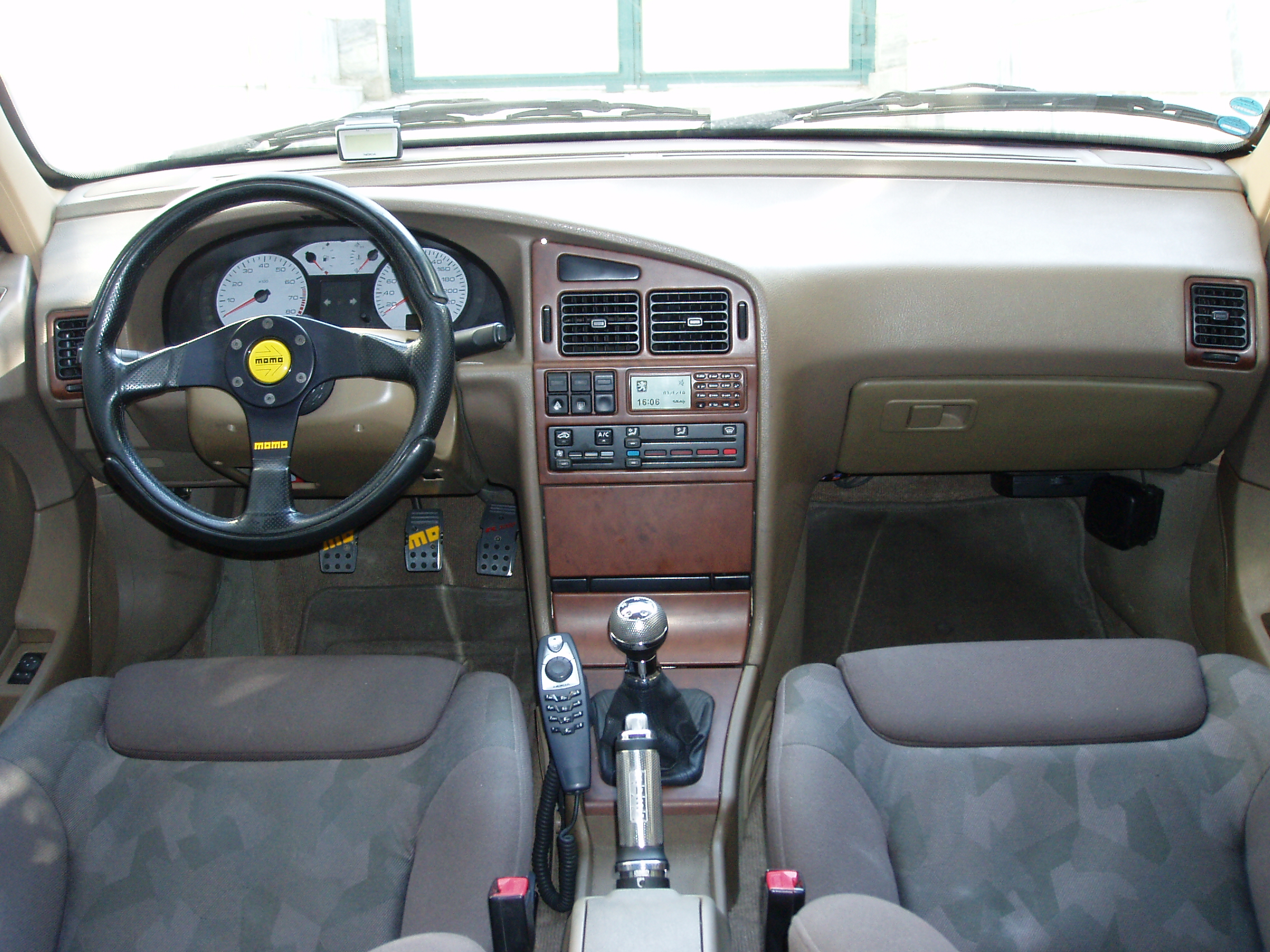
Momo accessories installed in a 2005 Peugeot Pars ELX

MOMO's product range includes consumer accessories such as steering wheels, shift knobs, alloy wheels, and tires through to race equipment such as racing suits and helmets. MOMO airbagged steering wheels have become standard accessories on some regional Subaru and Mitsubishi performance cars. MOMO steering wheels were standard features in the UMM Alter II from 1987 to 1991. MOMO has also designed a steering wheel for computer peripheral company Logitech (called the Logitech MOMO), to be used as a video game controller. Thomas Superwheel controllers (a brand of high-quality, premium priced controllers) also feature the MOMO name. Also watches, eyewear, fragrances, clothing, accessories, etc. are made by brand MOMO DESIGN.

== Motorsport involvement ==
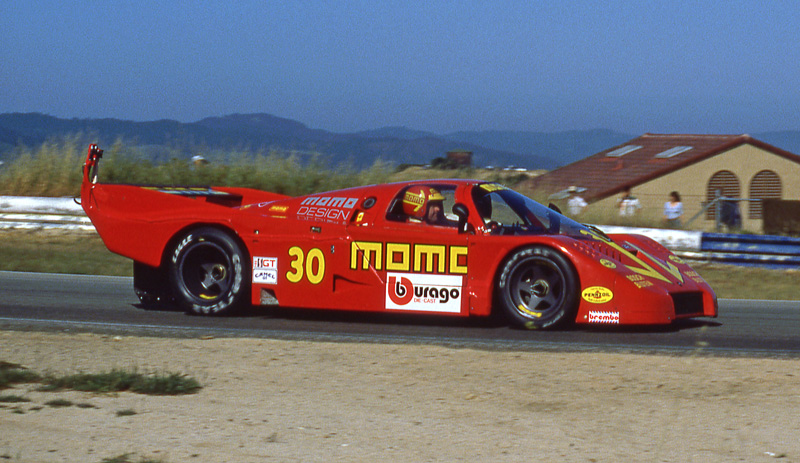
Momo founder Gianpiero Moretti at the wheel of an Alba AR3 at Laguna Seca in 1984.

The company sponsored many prototype cars in the IMSA WSC series including the Ferrari 333 SP sports prototype car, after Scuderia Ferrari had retired from that racing category 20 years earlier.

MOMO was the official steering wheel of the Champ Car series from 2004 to 2007, before Champ Car merged to Indy Racing League. MOMO are also suppliers of the official steering wheel, racing seats, clothing and racing accessories of the Speedcar Series.

MOMO also sponsors Lira Motorsports in the ARCA Racing Series and the Camping World Truck Series.

== See also ==
- List of companies of Italy
