= UMM Alter II =

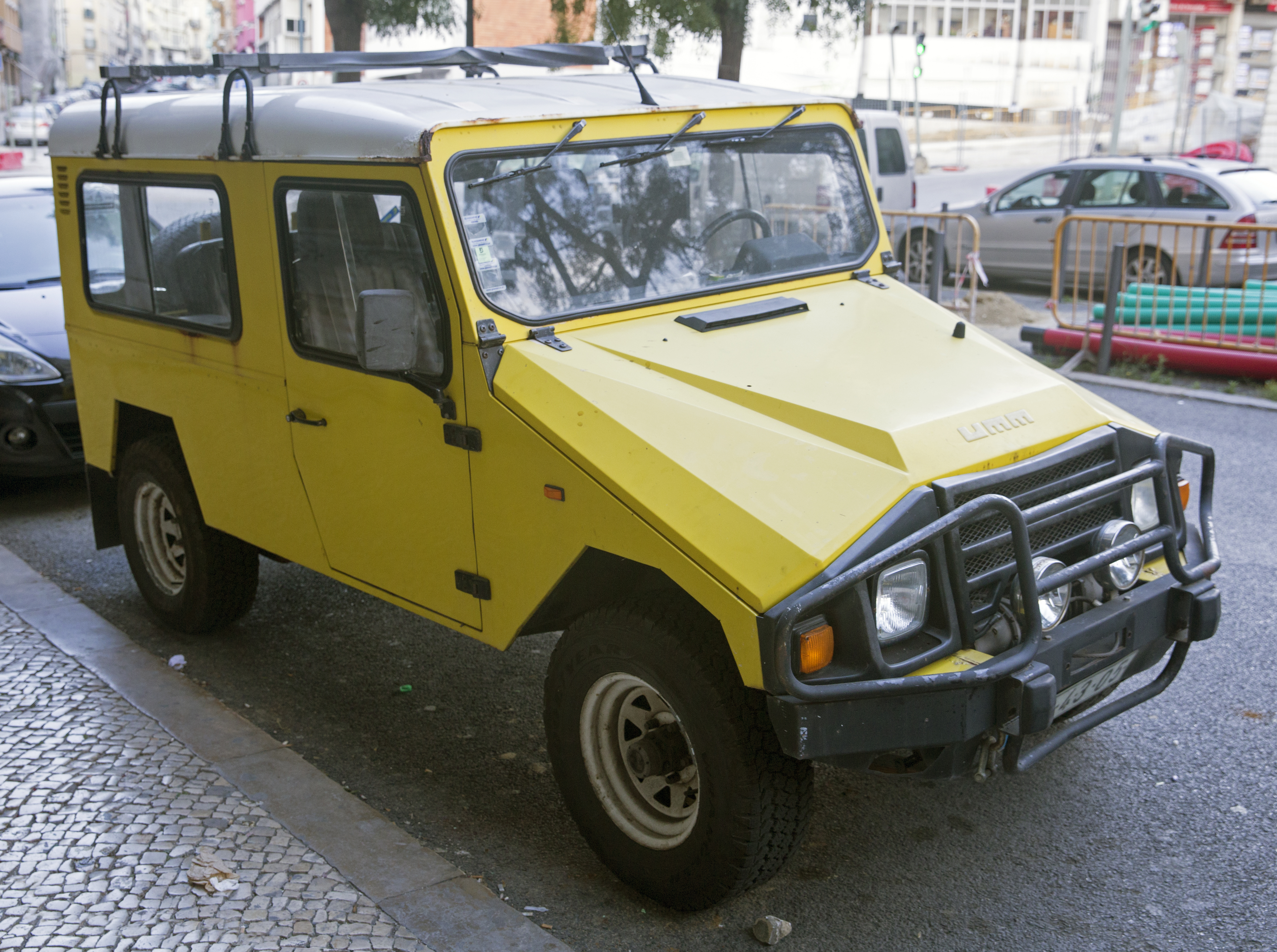

Overview
- Manufacturer: UMM
- Production: 1986-1994
- Assembly: Setúbal, Portugal (Movauto)

Body and chassis
- Class: Off Road Vehicle
- Layout: FR layout/All wheel drive

Powertrain
- Engine: 2.5L 76 PS I4 Diesel; 2.5L 110 PS I4 Turbodiesel; 2.4L 115 PS I6 Turbodiesel; 2.5L 130 PS I4 Turbodiesel; 2.5L 145 PS I6 Turbodiesel; 2.0L 82 PS I4 Petrol; 2.9L 140 PS V6 Petrol; 3.0L 150 PS V6 Petrol
- Transmission: 4-speed manual 5-speed manual

The UMM Alter II is a Portuguese automobile produced by UMM from 1986–1994.

== UMM Alter II Phase I ==
In 1986 the Alter II was released by the Portuguese automobile manufacturer União Metalo-Mecânica (UMM). It featured a new 4-speed manual gearbox, a new transfer case and a new suspension. The engine remained the same 2.5-litre diesel engine which developed 76 PS. Although it was a new model it was very similar to the previous one and very difficult to distinguish.

== UMM Alter II Phase II ==
In 1987 a new facelift was made. Alongside with the 2.5-litre naturally aspirated diesel engine, it was available a new 2.5-litre Turbo Intercooler engine, new 5-speed manual gearbox, ventilated disk brakes in the front axle, power steering and a MOMO (company) racing steering wheel.

In 1989 the Alter II was available in a long wheel-base in the pickup and soft-top versions.

In 1990 there was a crew cab chassis for the long-wheel-base model.

Some of the last models featured a new steering wheel that came from the Peugeot 405.

In 1992 six models came with BMW engines. 4 with the M21 2.4 Turbodiesel engine with 116 PS, 1 with the M51 2.5 tds engine with 145 PS and one with the M50 2.5 petrol engine with 192 PS.

== UMM Alter II Phase III ==
1993 saw another facelift. A redesigned dashboard was available, much more modern than the previous ones. Some of the electrical problems were also solved. It had some new suspension adjustments and new front bumper

In 1996 UMM stops building the Alter II to private customers.
