= Department of Economic Development (Dubai) =

Dubai Government Economic Department

Agency overview
- Formed: March 1992
- Headquarters: Dubai

The Department of Economic Development (DED) of the Emirate of Dubai is a government body entrusted to set and drive Dubai's economic agenda within the broader governance systems of the United Arab Emirates. The DED and its agencies develop economic plans and policies, identify and support strategic sectors, and provide services to domestic and international investors and businesses.

The DED was established in March 1992 and in October 2008 Sheikh Mohammed bin Rashid Al Maktoum, Ruler of Dubai, issued decree no. 25 giving the DED the responsibility to plan and regulate the overall economic performance of Dubai, supervise its functions and support the economic development to ensure the objectives of the Dubai Strategic Plan are achieved.

According to its website, "the DED supports the structural transformation of Dubai into a diversified, innovative service-based economy that aims to improve the business environment and accelerate productivity growth."

The mandate of the DED extended through four new agencies under its umbrella to include export development, retail development, entrepreneurship development and foreign investment. These sectors are the responsibility of the Dubai Export Development Corporation, Mohammed Bin Rashid Establishment for Young Business Leaders, Dubai Shopping Festival Office and the Foreign Investment Office.

The DED was the 2012 winner of the 'Distinguished Government Entity' in the Government of Dubai's excellence programme.

== Services Offered By DED ==
There are number of services offered by DED to existing business owners and budding entrepreneurs in Dubai.

- Instant License
- Reserve Trade Name
- Renew Trade Name
- Renew License
- Issue Initial Approval
- Issue Branch Initial Approval
- Print License
- License Activities' Terms And Conditions
- Manage License Contact
- Pay Inspection Fines
- Update Mobile Number

Legal contract related services provided are:

- Issue Legal Contract for License
- Issue Legal Contract
- Approve Legal Contract
- Print Legal Contract

Also, you can get answer of your enquiries related to

- Transaction Status/Payments
- Search Business Activities
- Search License Information
- Search Trade Names
- Search Sales and Promotions
