= European Development Centre =

European Development Centre or European Development Center may refer to:

- Digital Research European Development Centre (EDC), a department of Digital Research for OEM integration and system development in Newbury (1983–1986) and Hungerford, UK (1986–1991)
- Novell European Development Centre (EDC), a department of Novell for system development in Hungerford, UK (1991–1994)
