= Dubai Export Development Corporation =

Emirate of Dubai Dubai Exports
- مؤسسة دبي لتنمية الصادرات

Agency overview
- Headquarters: Dubai
- Agency executive: Saed Al Awadi, CEO
- Parent agency: Department of Economic Development
- Website: www.dedc.gov.ae

Dubai Export Development Corporation (EDC; Arabic: مؤسسة دبي لتنمية الصادرات) is an organization in Dubai, United Arab Emirates, created to advocate and assist exporting to foster economic development of the region. The EDC began operations in 2007, having been established in 2006 under Law No. 10/2006 by the Government of Dubai. Although autonomous, the EDC operates under governmental directive.
