= BMW M51 =

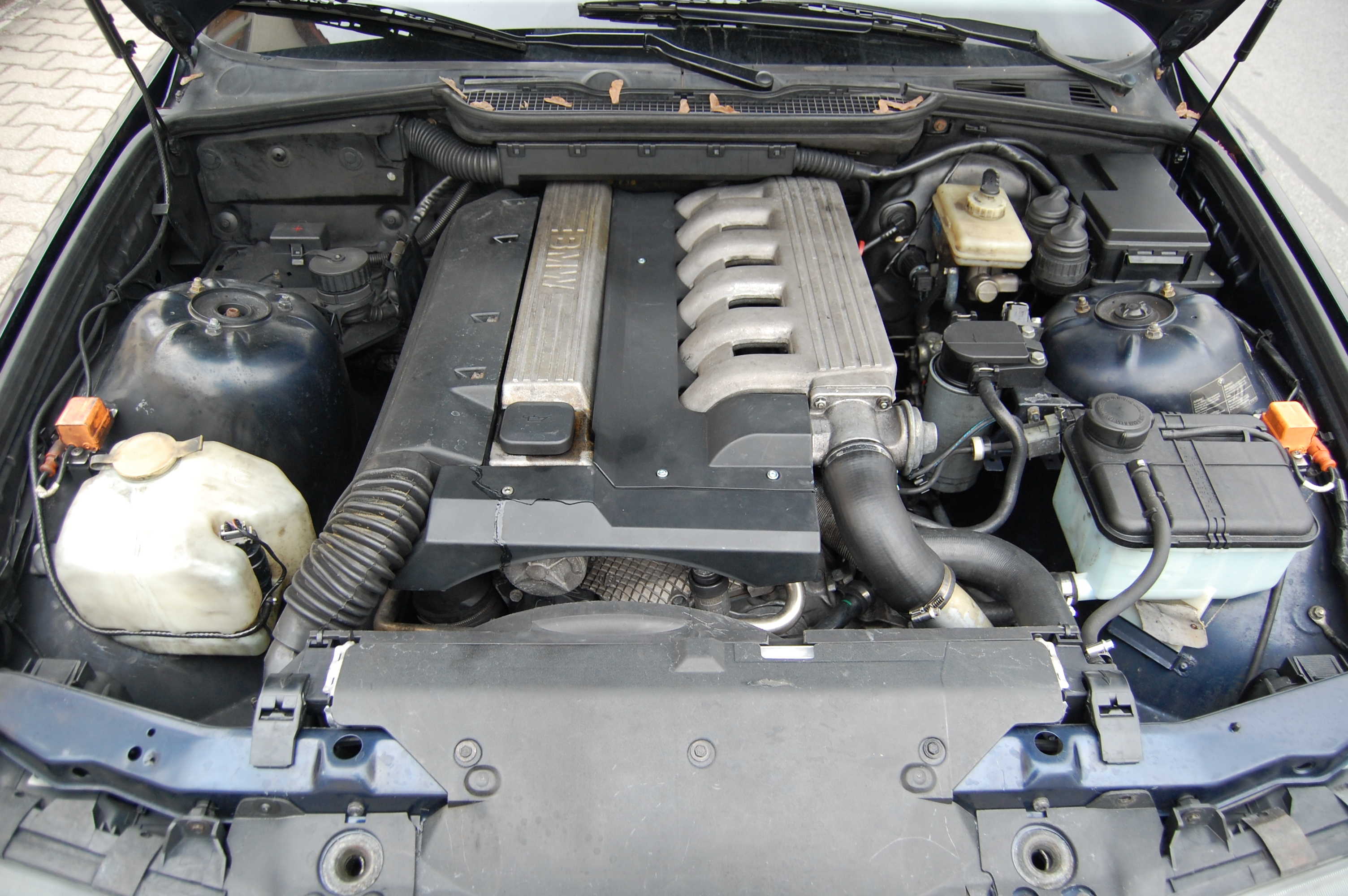

Overview
- Manufacturer: BMW
- Production: 1991-2000

Layout
- Configuration: Inline-6
- Displacement: 2.5 L; 152.4 cu in (2,497 cc)
- Cylinder bore: 80 mm (3.15 in)
- Piston stroke: 82.8 mm (3.26 in)
- Cylinder block material: Cast iron
- Valvetrain: SOHC 2 valves x cyl.
- Compression ratio: 22.0:1

Combustion
- Turbocharger: Single turbo, tds-engines also have an intercooler
- Fuel system: Swirl-chamber-injection
- Management: Bosch DDE 2.1
- Fuel type: Diesel fuel (DIN 51601)
- Cooling system: Water-cooled

Output
- Power output: 85–105 kW (114–141 hp)
- Torque output: 222–280 N⋅m (164–207 lb⋅ft)

Dimensions
- Dry weight: 132 kg (291 lb)

Chronology
- Predecessor: BMW M21
- Successor: BMW M57

The BMW M51 is an inline-6 cylinder Diesel engine produced by the Upper Austrian BMW plant in Steyr from July 1991 through February 2000. Its predecessor is the BMW M21; the successor is the BMW M57.

== Description ==
The M51 is a water-cooled and turbocharged inline six-cylinder diesel engine. It is an indirect injection design with fuel is supplied by and electronically - controlled Bosch VP37 distribution injection pump. The displacement is 2,497 cc (152.4 cu in) and the compression ratio is 22.0:1.

Some engine variants have an intercooler in addition to the turbocharger; vehicles so equipped can be identified by the designation tds. The M51 has a cast iron block and aluminum head, one chain driven overhead camshaft, and two valves per cylinder. Compared to the M21 the M51 features tappets and hydraulic valve lash adjustment. The fuel injection in the first engines and all E36 models is controlled by the Bosch DDE 2.1, which was replaced after the first technical revision by DDE 2.2, resulting in greater torque at lower revs. For lubrication, BMW originally approved a range of oil viscosities depending on the climate and ambient temperature, such was 10w-40 or 15w-40,l though 5w-40 synthetic oil is commonly used as modern replacement.

Version	Power	Torque	Years
M51D25 UL	85 kW (115 hp) at 4800 rpm	222 N⋅m (164 lb⋅ft) at 1900 rpm	1991–1997
M51D25 OL	105 kW (143 hp) at 4800 rpm	260 N⋅m (192 lb⋅ft) at 2200 rpm	1991–1996
Opel X25DT (Note: For Opel Omega B only)	96 kW (130 hp) at 4800 rpm	250 N⋅m (184 lb⋅ft) at 1400 rpm	1994–2001
M51D25TÜ UL	85 kW (115 hp) at 4800 rpm	230 N⋅m (170 lb⋅ft) at 1900 rpm	1996–1998
M51D25TÜ OL	105 kW (143 hp) at 4800 rpm	280 N⋅m (207 lb⋅ft) at 2200 rpm	1996–1998
M51D25TÜ OL	105 kW (143 hp) at 4600 rpm	280 N⋅m (207 lb⋅ft) at 2200 rpm	1998–2000
M51D25M1 (Note: For Range Rover P38 DSE 2.5 LP2 only.)	100 kW (136 hp) at 4400 rpm	270 N⋅m (199 lb⋅ft) at 2300 rpm	1995-2001

Applications:

- 1991 - 1996 BMW 325td (M51D25 UL)
- 1996 - 1998 BMW 325td (M51D25TÜ UL)
- 1993 - 1996 BMW 325tds (M51D25 OL)
- 1996 - 1998 BMW 325tds (M51D25TÜ OL)
- 1992 - 1996 BMW 525td (M51D25 UL)
- 1991 - 1996 BMW 525tds (M51D25 OL)
- 1996 - 2000 BMW 525tds (M51D25TÜ OL)
- 1996 - 2000 BMW 525td (M51D25TÜ UL)
- 1996 - 2000 BMW 725tds (M51D25TÜ OL)
- 1995 - 2001 Range Rover (P38A)
- 1994 - 2001 Opel Omega B
- 1992 UMM Alter II (single example; engine, gearbox, and electronics were fitted by BMW in Munich)

== See also ==
- List of BMW engines
