= BMW M10 =

BMW M10 engine
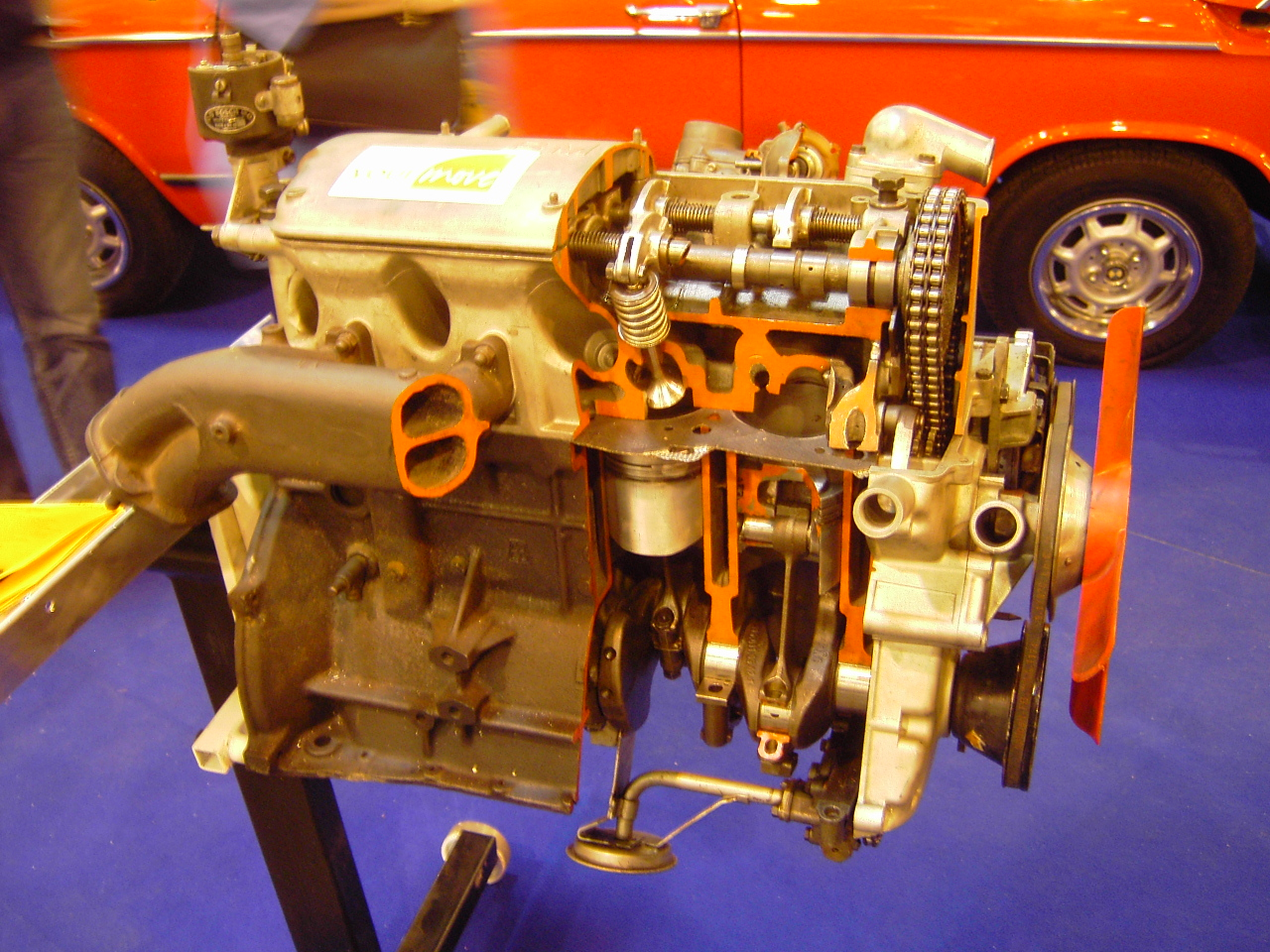

Overview
- Production: 1962–1988

Layout
- Configuration: Inline-4
- Displacement: 1.5 L (1,499 cc); 1.6 L (1,573 cc); 1.8 L (1,766 cc); 1.8 L (1,773 cc); 2.0 L (1,990 cc)
- Cylinder bore: 82 mm (3.23 in); 84 mm (3.31 in); 89 mm (3.5 in)
- Piston stroke: 71 mm (2.8 in); 80 mm (3.15 in)
- Cylinder block material: Cast iron
- Cylinder head material: Aluminum
- Valvetrain: SOHC

Combustion
- Fuel system: Solex carburetor Stromberg carburettor Kugelfischer mechanical FI; Bosch Jetronic manifold injection
- Fuel type: Petrol

Chronology
- Predecessor: None
- Successor: BMW M40

The BMW M10 is an SOHC inline-4 gasoline engine that was produced by BMW from February of 1962 to July of 1988. It was BMW's first four-cylinder engine since the BMW 309 ended production in 1936 and was introduced in the New Class sedans.

The M10 was used in many lower-end BMW models during the 1960s throughout the 1980s, with over 3.5 million engines being produced during its 26 year production run.

The turbocharged BMW M12 engine— used in the Formula One racing— was based on the M10 engine block and produced up to 1,400 PS (1,030 kW) in qualifying trim.

BMW began phasing out the M10 in 1987 with the introduction of the M40 engine, with the final carbureted E30 316's still using the M10 being produced in July of 1988.

== Development ==
Baron Alex von Falkenhausen, an engineer and race car driver, designed the M10 in the late 1950s. He was asked by BMW to design an engine with a displacement of 1.3 L (79 cu in), but felt that a displacement of 1.3 L would be insufficient for the company's future needs. He convinced BMW management that the minimum displacement should be 1.5 L (92 cu in), and offered an engine design that could be expanded to a maximum displacement of 2.0 L (122 cu in).

BMW debuted the M10 in 1.5 L format inside the BMW 1500 in September of 1961 at the Frankfurt International Motor Show, and began production for the consumer market in February of 1962.

== Design ==
The M10 has a cast iron cylinder block and an aluminum alloy cylinder head with hemispherical combustion chambers and two valves per cylinder. The cylinder block is a closed-deck design with siamesed cylinder bores. The cylinder head is a cross-flow design with manually-adjustable rocker arms. It features a forged crankshaft, counterbalance weights, five main bearings and a chain-driven camshaft. The engine is canted sideways at 30 degrees to reduce the vehicle's overall center of gravity.

The initial version of the M10 had a bore of 82 mm (3.2 in) and a stroke of 71 mm (2.8 in), resulting in a displacement of 1,499 cc (91.5 cu in). The peak power rating was 59 kW (80 PS; 79 hp).

== Naming conventions ==
The engine was initially known as the "M115" (the last two digits representing the 1.5 L displacement). Over the years, variants of the engine were given various codes (most of them starting with "M1" and the remaining digits relating to the displacement). In 1975, the engine became known as the "M10", then in 1980 it was given the standardised BMW engine code of M10B18 (where "M10" represents the series, B represents gasoline (Benzin in German) and the "18" represented its then 1.8 L displacement).

The M115 and all related engines have become retroactively known as the "M10" family.

== Variants ==
Variant	Displacement	Power	Torque	Compression Ratio	Fuel Delivery	Applications
M115	1,499 cc (91.5 cu in)	59 kW (80 PS; 79 hp) at 5700 rpm	118 N⋅m (87 lb⋅ft) at 3000 rpm	8.8:1	Solex 38 PDSI carburetor	1962-1964 1500
M116	1,573 cc (96.0 cu in)	61 kW (83 PS; 82 hp) at 5500 rpm	130 N⋅m (96 lb⋅ft) at 3500 rpm	8.6:1	Solex 36 PDSI carburetor	1964-1966 1600 1966-1975 1600-2
M116	1,573 cc (96.0 cu in)	77 kW (105 PS; 103 hp) at 6000 rpm	141 N⋅m (104 lb⋅ft) at 4500 rpm	9.5:1	2x Solex 40 PHH carburetor	1967-1968 1600ti
M41	1,573 cc (96.0 cu in)	66 kW (90 PS; 89 hp) at 6000 rpm	167 N⋅m (123 lb⋅ft) at 4000 rpm	8.3:1	Solex 32/32 DIDTA carburetor	1975-1980 E21 316
M98	1,573 cc (96.0 cu in)	55 kW (75 PS; 74 hp) at 5800 rpm	110 N⋅m (81 lb⋅ft) at 3200 rpm	9.5:1	Pierburg 1B2 carburetor	1981-1983 E21 315
M42	1,766 cc (107.8 cu in)	66 kW (90 PS; 89 hp) at 5500 rpm	142 N⋅m (105 lb⋅ft) at 3500 rpm	8.3:1	Solex 32/32 DIDTA	1976-1980 E12 518
M42	1,766 cc (107.8 cu in)	72 kW (98 PS; 97 hp) at 5800 rpm	142 N⋅m (105 lb⋅ft) at 4000 rpm	8.3:1	Solex 32/32 DIDTA	1975-1980 E21 318
M118 short stroke	1,766 cc (107.8 cu in)	66 kW (90 PS; 89 hp) at 5250 rpm	146 N⋅m (108 lb⋅ft) at 3000 rpm	8.6:1	Solex 38 PDSI carburetor	1971-1975 1802
M92	1,766 cc (107.8 cu in)	77 kW (105 PS; 103 hp) at 5800 rpm	145 N⋅m (107 lb⋅ft) at 4500 rpm	10.0:1	Bosch K-Jetronic	1980-1983 E21 318i 1982-1987 E28 518i
M10B18	1,766 cc (107.8 cu in)	75 kW (102 PS; 101 hp) at 5800 rpm	135 N⋅m (100 lb⋅ft) at 4500 rpm	8.8:1	Bosch K-Jetronic with Lambda	1980-1983 E21 320i (US-spec)
M118	1,773 cc (108.2 cu in)	66 kW (90 PS; 89 hp) at 5,250 rpm	144 N⋅m (106 lb⋅ft) at 3000 rpm	8.6:1	Solex 36 PDSI carburetor	1963-1968 1800
M118	1,773 cc (108.2 cu in)	81 kW (110 PS; 108 hp) at 5800 rpm	148 N⋅m (109 lb⋅ft) at 4000 rpm	9.5:1	2x Solex 40 PHH carburetor	1964-1968 1800ti
M118	1,773 cc (108.2 cu in)	96 kW (130 PS; 128 hp) at 6100 rpm	157 N⋅m (116 lb⋅ft) at 5100 rpm	10.5:1	2x Weber 45DCOE carburetor	1800tiSA
M05	1,990 cc (121.4 cu in)	74 kW (100 PS; 99 hp) at 5500 rpm	157 N⋅m (116 lb⋅ft) at 3000 rpm	8.5:1	Solex 40 PDSI carburetor (manual) Solex 32/32 DIDTA carburetor (automatic)	1966-1972 2000 1966-1970 2000C 1968-1976 2002
M05	1,990 cc (121.4 cu in)	88 kW (120 PS; 118 hp) at 5600 rpm	167 N⋅m (123 lb⋅ft) at 3500 rpm	9.3:1	2x Solex PHH carburetor	1965-1970 2000CS 1966-1971 2000ti
M15	1,990 cc (121.4 cu in)	96 kW (130 PS; 128 hp) at 5800 rpm	177 N⋅m (131 lb⋅ft) at 4500 rpm	9.5:1	Kugelfischer PL-04 mechanical fuel injection	1972-1974 2002tii
M17	1,990 cc (121.4 cu in)	85 kW (115 PS; 113 hp) at 5800 rpm	165 N⋅m (122 lb⋅ft) at 3700 rpm	9.0:1	Stromberg 175 COET carburetor	1972-1977 E12 520
M43/1	1,990 cc (121.4 cu in)	80 kW (109 PS; 107 hp) at 5800 rpm	160 N⋅m (118 lb⋅ft) at 3700 rpm	8.1:1	Solex 32/32 DIDTA carburetor	1975-1979 E21 320
M64	1,990 cc (121.4 cu in)	92 kW (125 PS; 123 hp) at 5700 rpm	175 N⋅m (129 lb⋅ft) at 4350 rpm	9.3:1	Bosch K-Jetronic continuous injection system	1975-1979 E21 320i (euro-spec) 1975-1979 E12 520i
M10B20	1,990 cc (121.4 cu in)	81 kW (110 PS; 109 hp) at 5700 rpm	152 N⋅m (112 lb⋅ft) at 4350 rpm	8.8:1	Bosch K-Jetronic continuous injection system	1977-1979 E21 320i (US-spec)
M31	1,990 cc (121.4 cu in) turbo	125 kW (170 PS; 168 hp) at 5800 rpm	245 N⋅m (181 lb⋅ft) at 4000 rpm	6.9:1	Kugelfischer PL-04 mechanical fuel injection and KKK BLD turbocharacter @ 7 psi	1973-1975 2002 turbo

=== 1499 cc engines ===
The M115 version has a displacement of 1,499 cc (91.5 cu in) and produces 55–60 kW (75–82 PS; 74–80 hp). It has a bore of 82 mm (3.2 in) and a stroke of 71 mm (2.8 in). Lower power models have a compression ratio of 8.0:1, while higher power models have a compressions ratio of 8.8:1. Fuel is supplied via a Solex 38 PDSI carburettor.

Applications:

- 1962-1964 BMW 1500

=== 1573 cc engines ===
The M116 version has a displacement of 1,573 cc (96.0 cu in) and produces 63–77 kW (86–105 PS; 84–103 hp). It has a bore of 84 mm (3.3 in) and a stroke of 71 mm (2.8 in). The standard specification has a compression ratio of 8.6:1 and uses a Solex 38 PDSI carburettor. The 1600 ti version has a compression ratio of 9.5:1 and uses twin Solex 40 PHH carburettors.

Applications:

- 1975-1977 BMW 1502
- 1964-1966 BMW 1600— 63 kW (86 PS)
- 1966-1975 BMW 1600-2/1602— 63 kW (86 PS)
- 1967-1968 BMW 1600 ti— 77 kW (105 PS)

The M41 version produces 66 kW (90 PS; 89 hp), has an 8.3:1 compression ratio and fuel is supplied by a Solex 32 DIDTA carburettor.

Applications:

- 1975-1980 E21 316

The M98 version produces 55 kW (75 PS; 74 hp), has a compression ratio of 9.5:1 and uses a Pierburg 1B2 carburettor.

Applications:

- 1981-1983 E21 315

=== 1766 cc engines ===
The M10B18 version has a displacement of 1,766 cc (107.8 cu in) and produces 66–77 kW (90–105 PS; 89–104 hp), depending on specification. The bore is 89 mm (3.5 in) and the stroke is 71 mm (2.8 in).

Applications:

- 1969-1972 1800— 66 kW (90 PS), 8.6:1 compression, Solex 36-40 PDSI carburettor
- 1971-1975 1802— 66 kW (90 PS), 8.6:1 compression, Solex 38 PDSI carburettor
- 1980-1983 E21 320i/320is— U.S. only, 75 kW (101 hp), 8.8:1 compression, Bosch K-Jetronic mechanical fuel injection
- 1980-1983 E12 518— South Africa only, 77 kW (105 PS), 10.0:1 compression, Bosch K-Jetronic mechanical fuel injection
- 1982-1987 E30 316 — 66 kW (90 PS), 9.5:1 compression, Pierburg 2BE carburettor, Ecotronic.
- 1982-1988 E30 318i— 77 kW (105 PS), 10.0:1 compression, Bosch L-Jetronic electronic fuel injection
- 1981-1988 E28 518i— 77 kW (105 PS), 9.5:1 compression, Bosch LE-Jetronic mechanical fuel injection.

=== 1773 cc engines ===
The M118 version has a displacement of 1,773 cc (108.2 cu in) and produces 66–96 kW (90–130 PS; 89–128 hp), depending on specification. The bore is 84 mm (3.3 in) and the stroke is 80 mm (3.1 in).

Applications:

- 1963-1968 1800— 66 kW (90 PS), 8.6:1 compression, Solex 36-40 PDSI carburettor
- 1963-1966 1800ti— 81 kW (110 PS), 9.5:1 compression, twin Solex 40 PHH carburettors
- 1964-1965 1800tiSA— 96 kW (130 PS), 10.5:1 compression, twin Weber DCOE-45 carburettors
- 1974-1981 E12 518— 66 kW (90 PS), 8.6:1 compression, Solex 38 PDSI carburettor

=== 1990 cc engines ===
The M05 version has a displacement of 1,990 cc (121.4 cu in) and produces 74–88 kW (100–120 PS; 99–118 hp), depending on specification. It has a bore of 89 mm (3.5 in) and a stroke of 80 mm (3.1 in).

Applications:

- 1965-1970 BMW 2000CS— 88 kW (120 PS), 9.3:1 compression, 2x Solex 40 PHH carburettors
- 1966-1970 BMW 2000C— 74 kW (100 PS), 8.5:1 compression, Solex 40 PDSI carburettor
- 1966-1972 BMW 2000— 74 kW (100 PS), 8.5:1 compression, Solex 40 PDSI carburettor
- 1966-1971 BMW 2000ti— 88 kW (120 PS), 9.3:1 compression, 2x Solex 40 PHH carburettors
- 1968-1976 BMW 2002— 74 kW (100 PS), 8.5:1 compression, Solex 40 PDSI carburettor

The M15 version used the Kugelfischer mechanical fuel injection and produced 96 kW (130 PS; 128 hp). It was also known as the tii engine.

Applications:

- 1970-1973 2000tii
- 1972-1974 2002tii
- 1972-1974 E12 520i

The M17 version produces 85 kW (115 PS). It has compression ratio of 9.0:1 and uses either a Stromberg 175 CDET or a Solex 4A1 carburettor.

Applications:

- 1972-1977 E12 520

The M43/1 version has a compression ratio of 8.1:1 and produces 81 kW (110 PS; 109 hp).

Applications:

- 1975-1979 E21 320— Solex 32-32 DIDTA carburettor
- 1975-1979 E21 320i— USA only, Bosch K-Jetronic mechanical fuel injection

The M64 version produces 92 kW (125 PS). It has a compression ratio of 9.3:1 and uses Bosch K-Jetronic mechanical fuel injection.

Applications:

- 1975-1978 E21 320i
- 1975-1979 E12 520i

The M31 version uses a KKK BLD turbocharger operating @ 7psi and produces 125 kW (170 PS). It has a compression ratio of 6.9:1 and uses Schafer PL 04 mechanical fuel injection.

Applications:

- 1973-1975 2002 turbo

== Related engines ==
- The highly successful M12 turbocharged motorsport engine was based on the M10 engine block.
- The S14 engine used in the E30 M3 was based on the M10 block.

== See also ==
- List of BMW engines
