= BMW S14 =

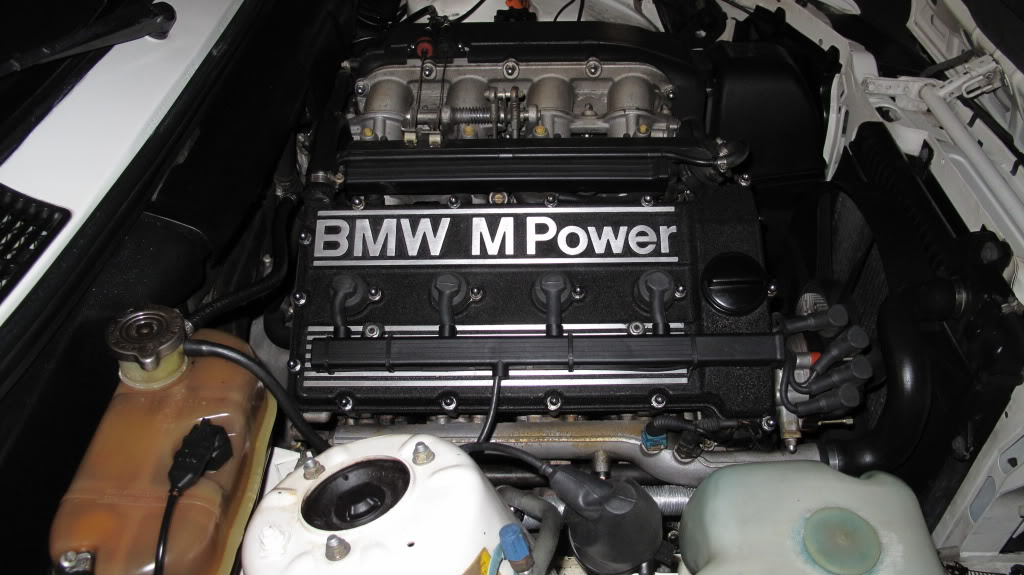

Overview
- Production: 1986-1991

Layout
- Configuration: Inline-4
- Displacement: 2.0 L (1,990 cc); 2.3 L (2,302 cc); 2.5 L (2,467 cc)
- Cylinder bore: 93.4 mm (3.68 in); 95 mm (3.74 in)
- Piston stroke: 72.6 mm (2.86 in); 84 mm (3.31 in); 87 mm (3.43 in)
- Cylinder block material: Cast iron
- Cylinder head material: Aluminium
- Valvetrain: DOHC

Combustion
- Fuel type: Petrol

Chronology
- Predecessor: None
- Successor: None

The BMW S14 is a DOHC four-cylinder petrol engine which was used in the E30 M3, E30 320iS, and E36 318i Super Touring. It is based on the BMW M10 block and what is essentially a shortened BMW S38 cylinder head. The direct successor to the S14 was the S42 based on the M42 engine. The S42 was a racing engine installed in the E36 320i for the German Super Tourenwagen Cup. There is no direct successor to the S14 for production BMWs, since the following generation of M3 is powered by the BMW S50 six-cylinder engine.

Two separate throttle bodies are used, each incorporating two throttle butterfly plates.

== Versions ==
Version	Displacement	Power	Torque	Year
S14B20	1,990 cc (121.4 cu in)	141 kW (189 bhp) at 6,900 rpm	210 N⋅m (155 lb⋅ft) at 4,900 rpm	1987-1990
S14B23	2,302 cc (140.5 cu in)	143 kW (192 bhp) at 6,750 rpm	230 N⋅m (170 lb⋅ft) at 4,750 rpm	1986–1989
S14B23	2,302 cc (140.5 cu in)	147 kW (197 bhp) at 6,750 rpm	240 N⋅m (177 lb⋅ft) at 4,750 rpm	1986–1989
S14B23	2,302 cc (140.5 cu in)	158 kW (212 bhp) at 6,750 rpm	230 N⋅m (170 lb⋅ft) at 4,600 rpm	1989–1991
S14B23 EVO2	2,302 cc (140.5 cu in)	162 kW (217 bhp) at 6,750 rpm	245 N⋅m (181 lb⋅ft) at 4,750 rpm	1988-1990
S14B25 EVO3	2,467 cc (150.5 cu in)	175 kW (235 bhp) at 7,000 rpm	240 N⋅m (177 lb⋅ft) at 4,750 rpm	1989-1990

== S14B20 ==
This version was only sold in Portugal and Italy to take advantage of lower taxes for cars with displacements under two litres. It has a displacement reduced to 1,990 cc (121.4 cu in) by shortening the stroke to 72.6 mm (2.9 in).

Applications:

- 1987-1990 E30 320iS (Italy and Portugal only)

== S14B23 ==
The E30 M3 was initially released with the 147 kW (197 bhp) S14B23 engine. Versions equipped with a catalytic converter produced 143 kW (192 bhp) and 230 Nm. In April 1989, the Ravaglia and Cecotto limited edition M3s were released with a 158 kW (212 bhp) S14B23 that would in September, 1989 become the standard motor for the E30 M3.

Applications:

- 1986-1991 E30 M3

== S14B23 EVO2 ==
This update of the S14B23 produced 162 kW (217 bhp), or 158 kW (212 bhp) if equipped with a catalytic converter.

Applications:

- 1988-1990 E30 M3

== S14B25 EVO3 ==
In 1989, the displacement was enlarged to 2,467 cc (2.5 L) and this engine produced 175 kW (235 hp).

Applications:

- 1989-1990 E30 M3

== See also ==
- BMW
- List of BMW engines
