= BMW 3 Series (E30) =

Second generation of BMW 3 Series

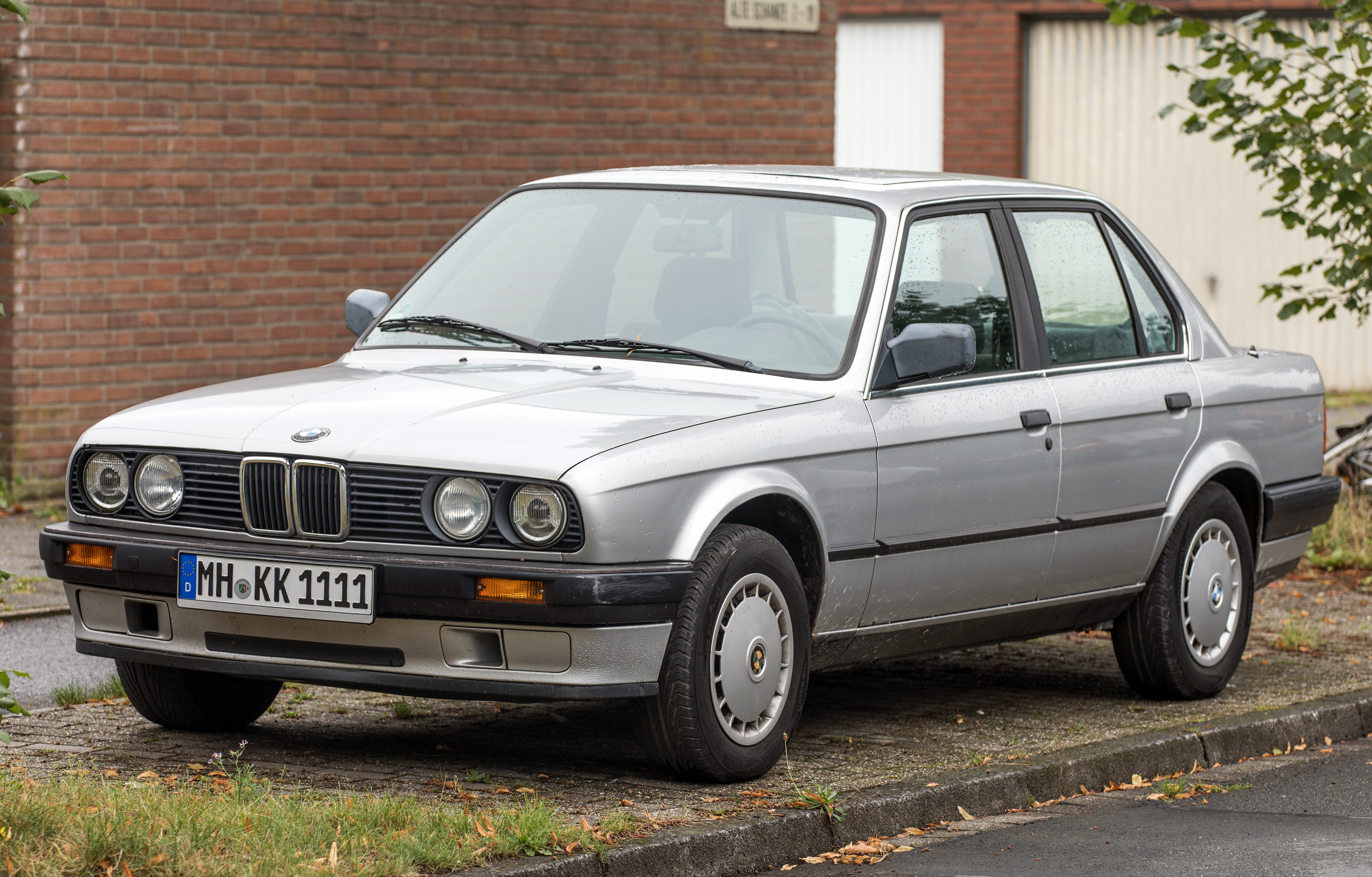

Overview
- Manufacturer: BMW
- Model code: E30
- Production: 1982–1994
- Model years: 1984–1991 (North America)
- Assembly: West Germany: Munich; Regensburg; South Africa: Rosslyn (BMW SA)
- Designer: Claus Luthe, Boyke Boyer

Body and chassis
- Class: Compact executive car (D)
- Body style: 2/4-door saloon; 2-door convertible; 5-door wagon
- Layout: Rear-wheel drive; All-wheel drive (325iX only)
- Related: BMW M3 (E30); Alpina B3 E30

Powertrain
- Engine: Petrol: 1.6-1.8 L M10 I4; 1.6-1.8 L M40 I4; 1.8 L M42 16v I4; 2.0-2.5 L S14 I4; 2.0-2.7 L M20 I6; 3.2 L M30 I6; Diesel: 2.4 L M21 I6
- Transmission: 4-speed manual; 5-speed manual; 3-speed ZF 3HP automatic; 4-speed ZF 4HP automatic

Dimensions
- Wheelbase: 2,570 mm (101.2 in)
- Length: 4,320–4,460 mm (170.1–175.6 in)
- Width: 1,645 mm (64.8 in)
- Height: 1,360–1,400 mm (53.5–55.1 in)
- Curb weight: 1,080–1,200 kg (2,380–2,650 lb)

Chronology
- Predecessor: BMW 3 Series (E21)
- Successor: BMW 3 Series (E36)

The BMW E30 is the second generation of BMW 3 Series, which was produced from 1982 to 1994 and replaced the E21 3 Series. The model range included 2-door saloon (sometimes referred to as a coupé) and convertible body styles, as well as being the first 3 Series to be produced in 4-door saloon and wagon/estate body styles. It was powered by four-cylinder petrol, six-cylinder petrol and six-cylinder diesel engines, the latter a first for the 3 Series. The E30 325iX model was the first BMW to have all-wheel drive.

The first BMW M3 model was built on the E30 platform and was powered by the high-revving BMW S14 four-cylinder petrol engine. The BMW Z1 roadster was also based on the E30 platform. Following the launch of the E36 3 Series in 1990, the E30 began to be phased out.

== Development ==
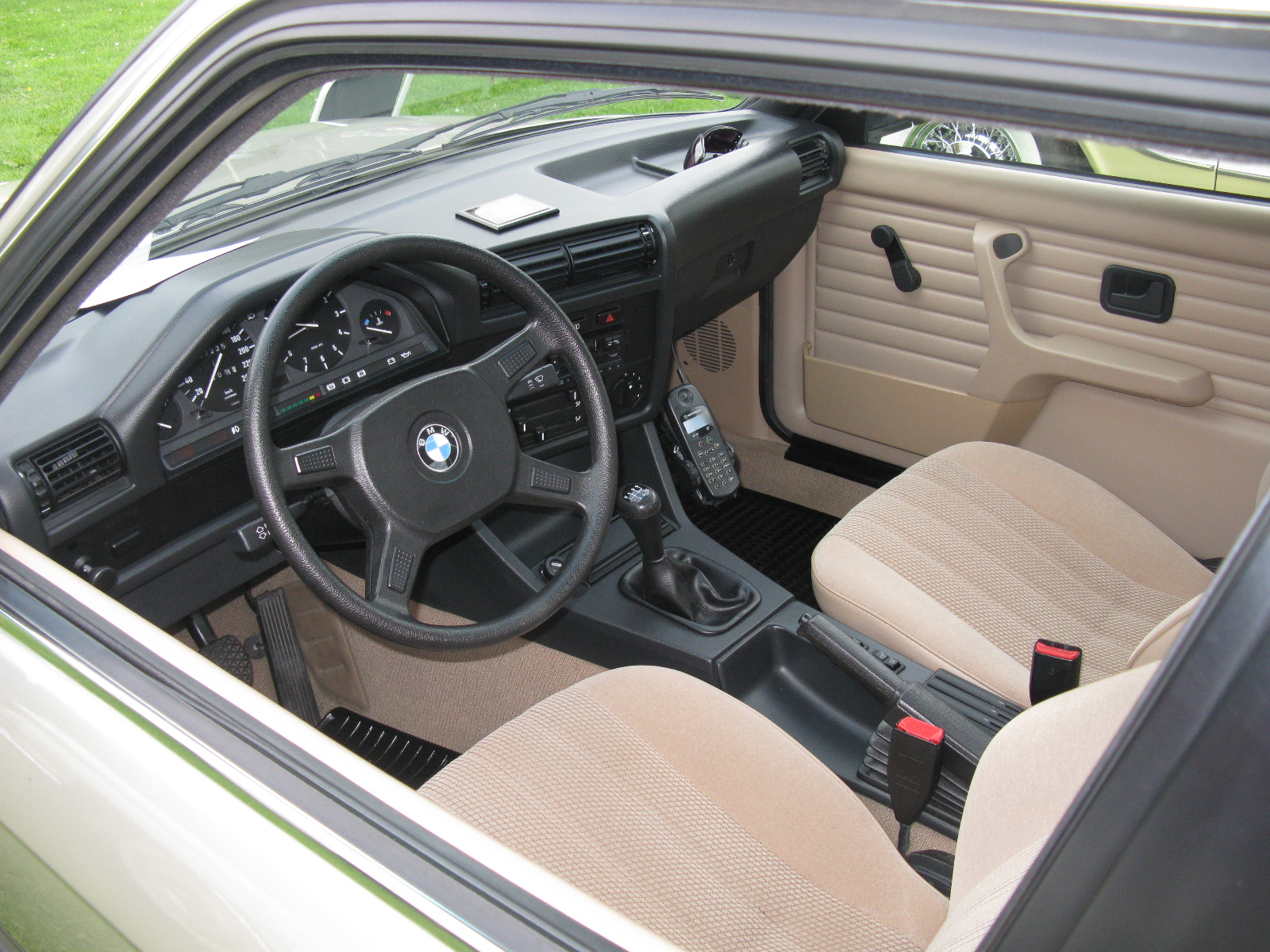
Interior of a 316i model

Development of the E30 3 Series began in July 1976, with styling being developed under chief designer Claus Luthe with exterior styling led by Boyke Boyer. In 1978, the final design was approved, with design freeze (cubing process) being completed in 1979. BMW's launch film for the E30 shows the design process including Computer-aided design (CAD), crash testing and wind-tunnel testing. The car was released at the end of November 1982.

Externally, the E30's appearance is very similar to twin headlight versions of its E21 predecessor, however there are various detail changes in styling to the E30. Major differences to the E21 include the interior and a revised suspension, the latter to reduce the oversteer for which the E21 was criticised.

=== Minor update (1985) ===
In September 1985 the exterior and interior trim were updated. The 323i model was replaced with the 325i at this time and the diesel-engined 324d was introduced. A factory convertible entered the model range. However, the Baur remained on sale, alongside the factory convertible. The M3 convertible was only offered for the European market.

=== Major update (1988) ===
At the Frankfurt Motor Show in September 1987, BMW introduced a major update to the E30 (often called Series 2). The changes to the lineup were the addition of the Touring (station wagon) variant and removal of the 325e model. The 1988 update models remained largely unchanged until the end of production, with the addition of the 318is model in 1989.

External styling changes included redesigned rear lights, front bumper and a reduction in the amount of chrome trim. The back was completely redesigned with new redesigned larger rear fenders and front wings slightly inflated and wider in the end. The four-cylinder engine was upgraded from the BMW M10 to the BMW M40 and various other mechanical changes were made. Rust protection was improved with the update.

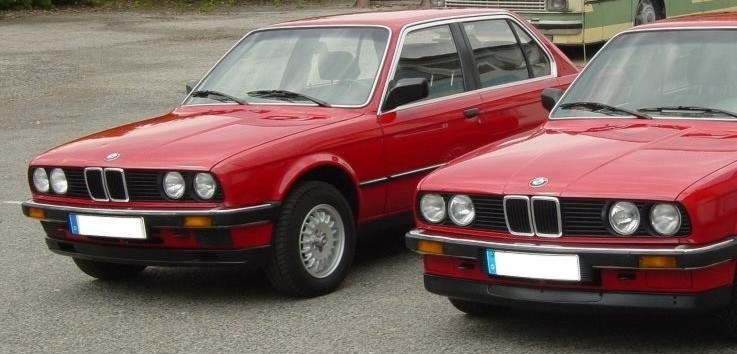
A pre-facelift (1982–1985) model parked to the left of a 1986–1987 model (first facelift).

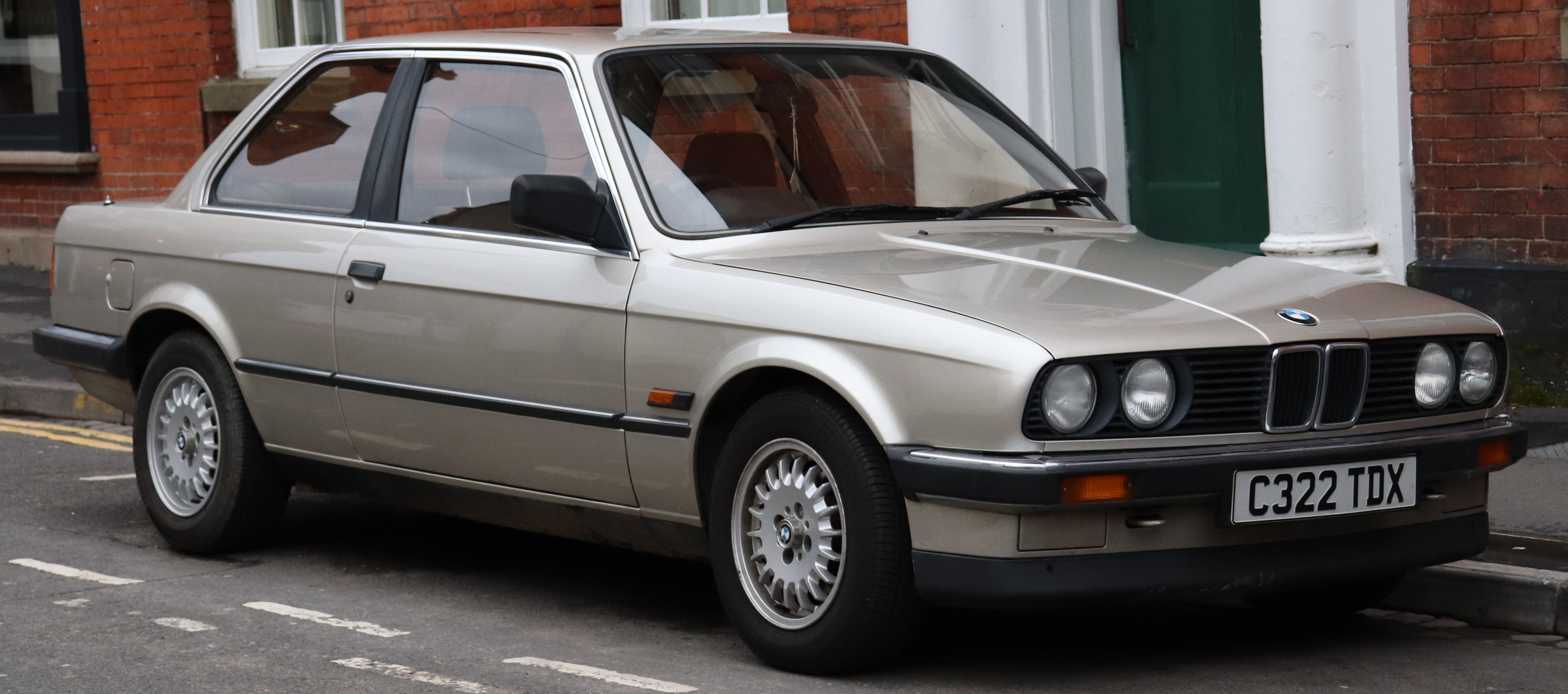
1986–1987 BMW E30/2. In 1986, the E30 received an aerodynamically improved front bumper that extends further downward.

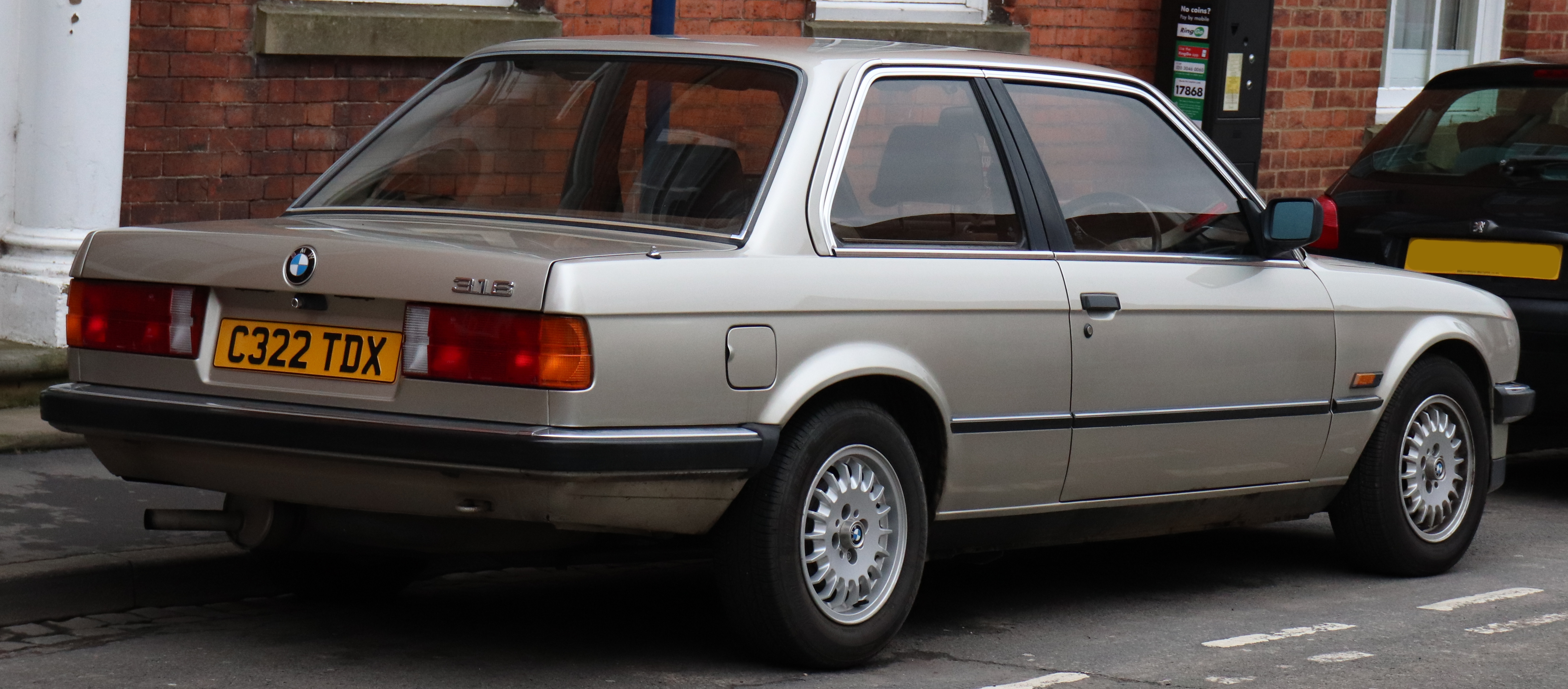
1986–1987 BMW 318i; rear view.

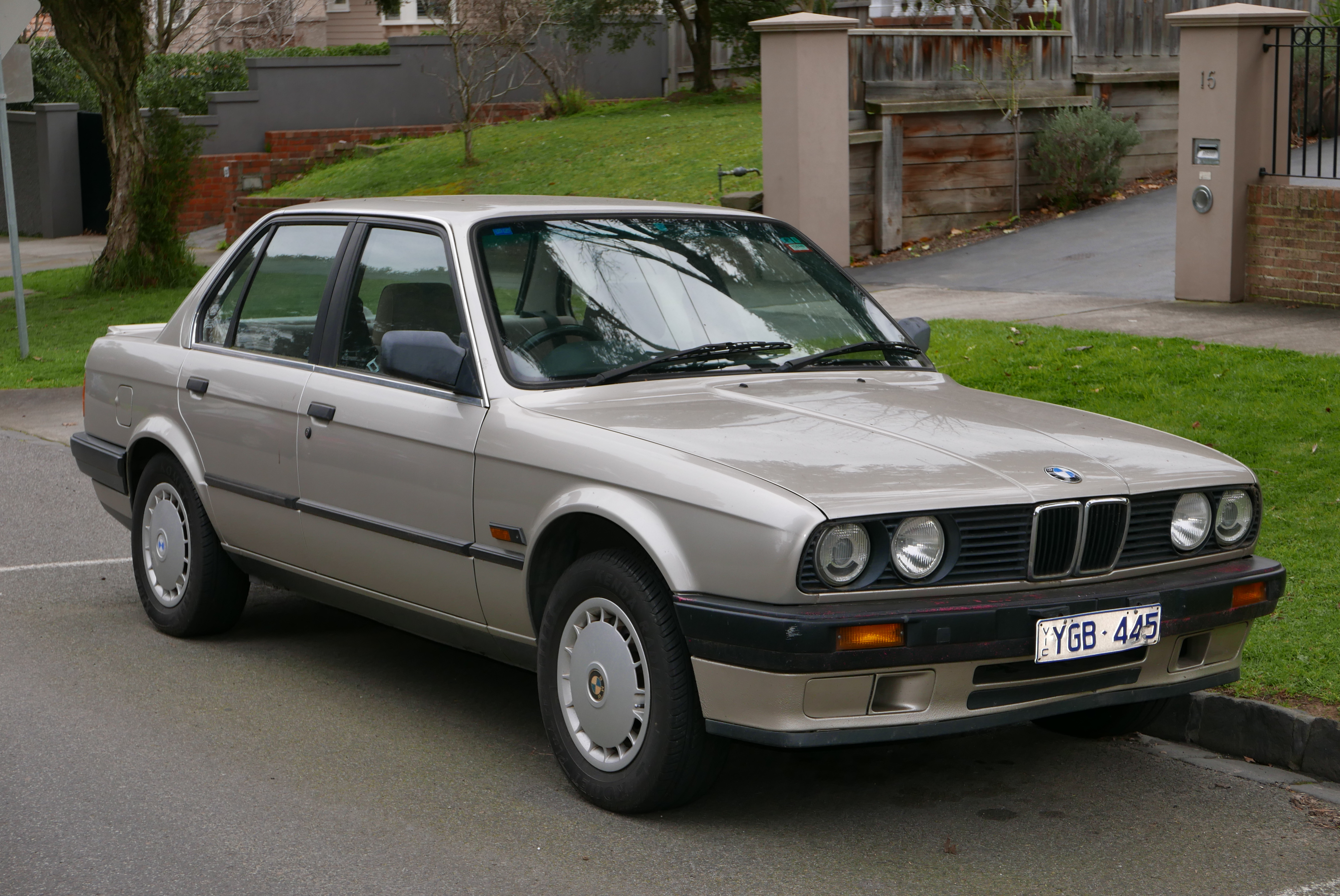
1988–1991 BMW E30/2. In 1987, the E30 received a major facelift with a new front bumper and altered sheetmetal.

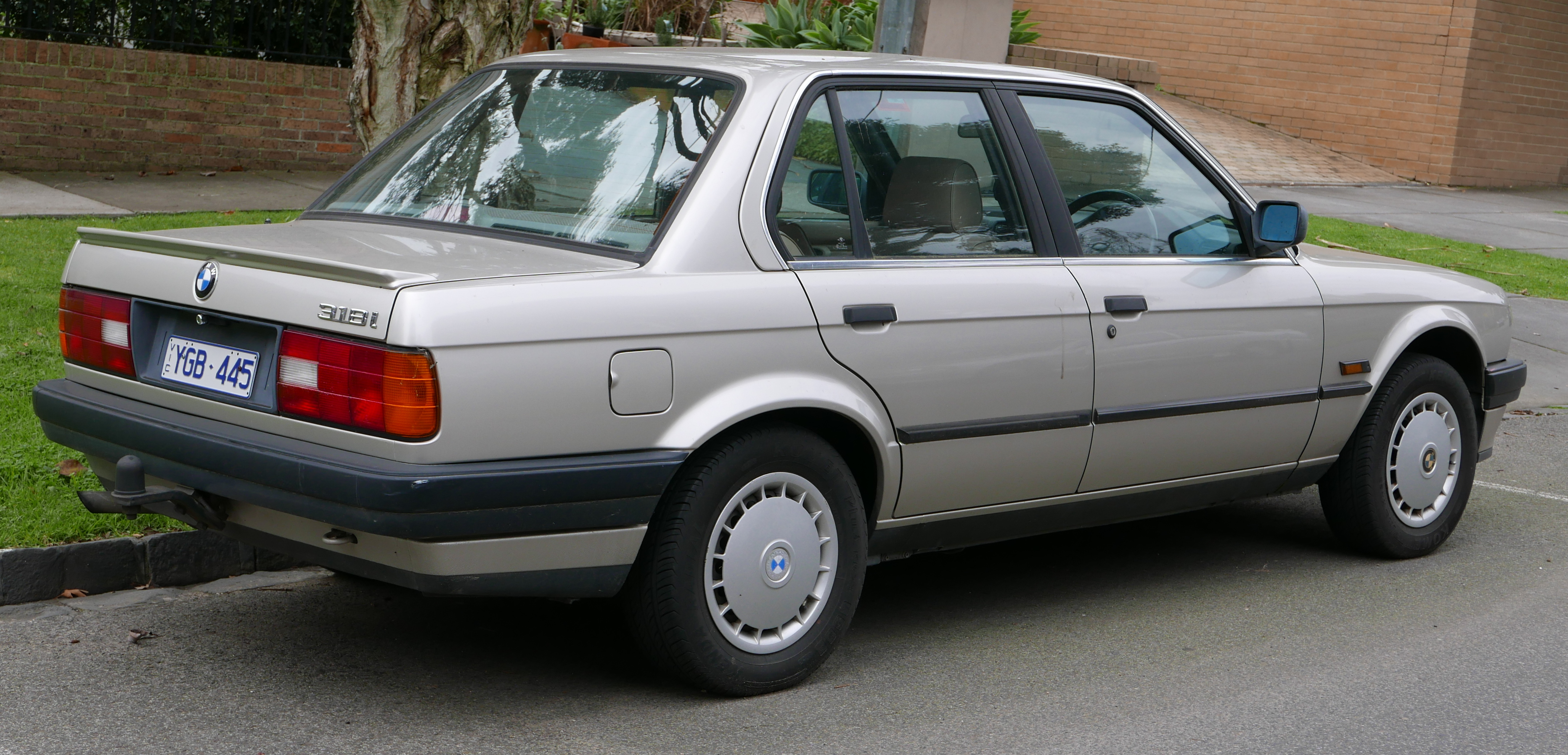
The 1988 update also received new, larger taillights.

== Body styles ==
In addition to the two-door saloon and Baur convertible body styles of its E21 predecessors, the E30 later also became available as a four-door saloon and five-door station wagon (marketed as "Touring").

The Touring body style began life as a prototype built by BMW engineer Max Reisböck in his friend's garage in 1984 and began production in 1987. The factory convertible version began production in 1985, with the Baur convertible conversions remaining available alongside it.

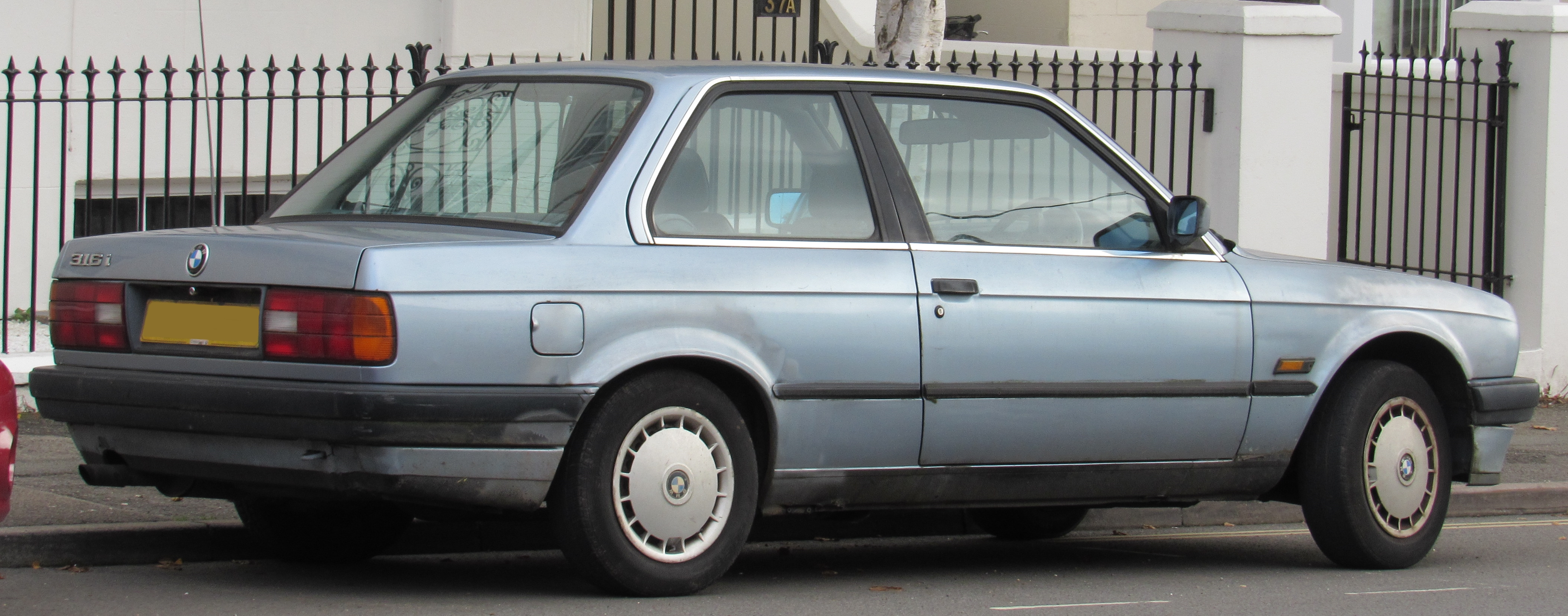
E30 two-door saloon

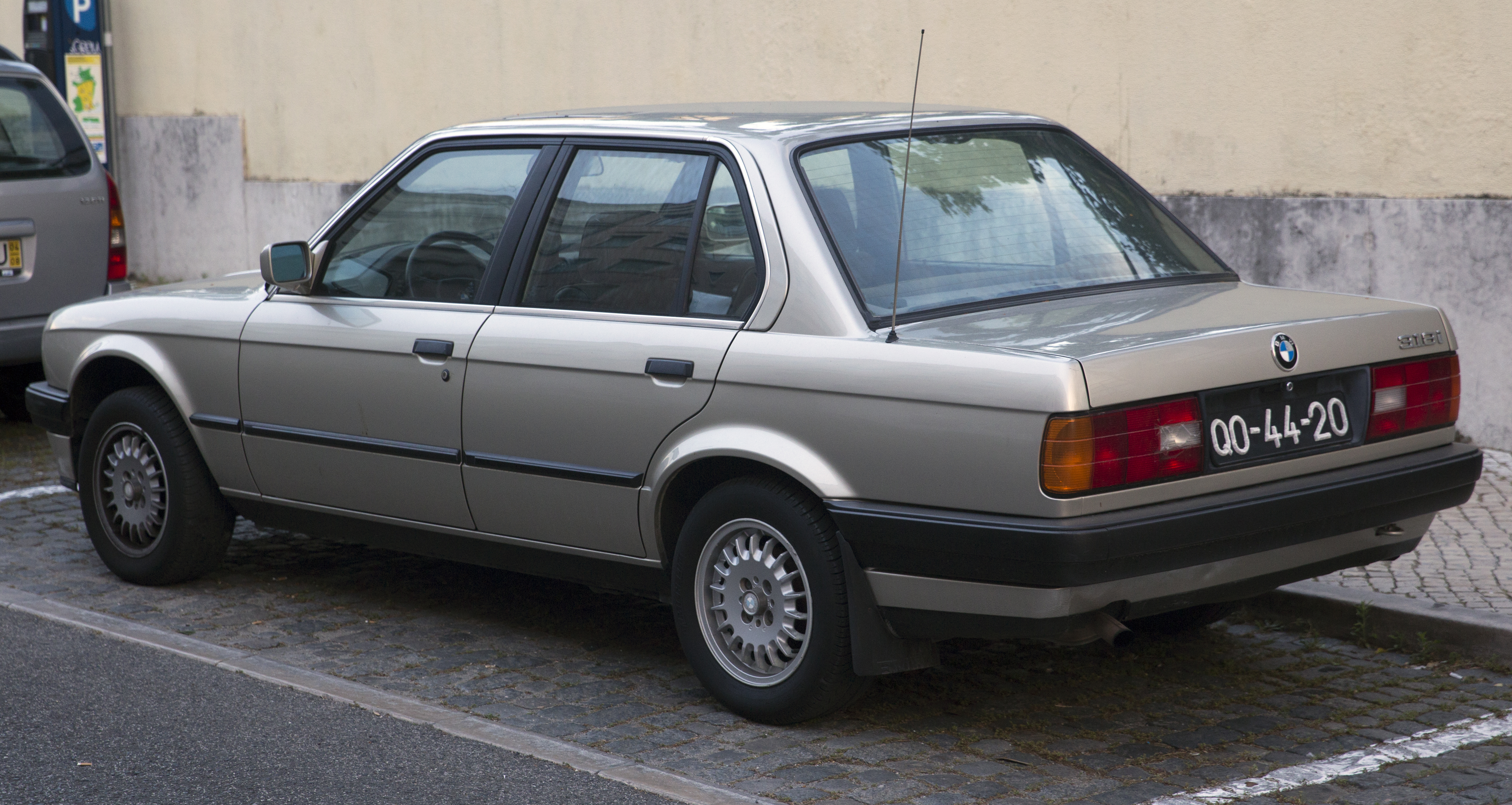
E30 four-door saloon

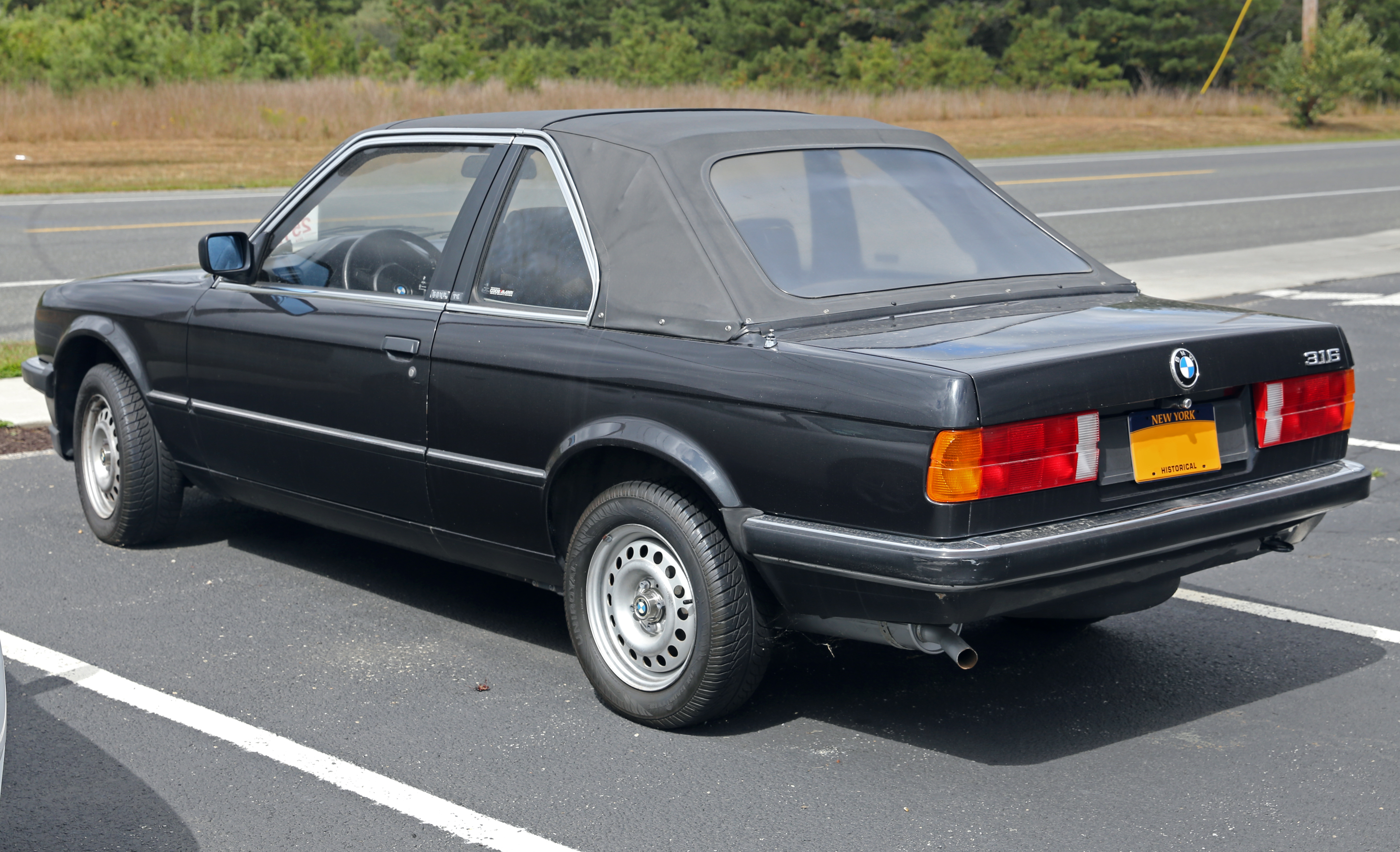
E30 Baur TopCabriolet 2

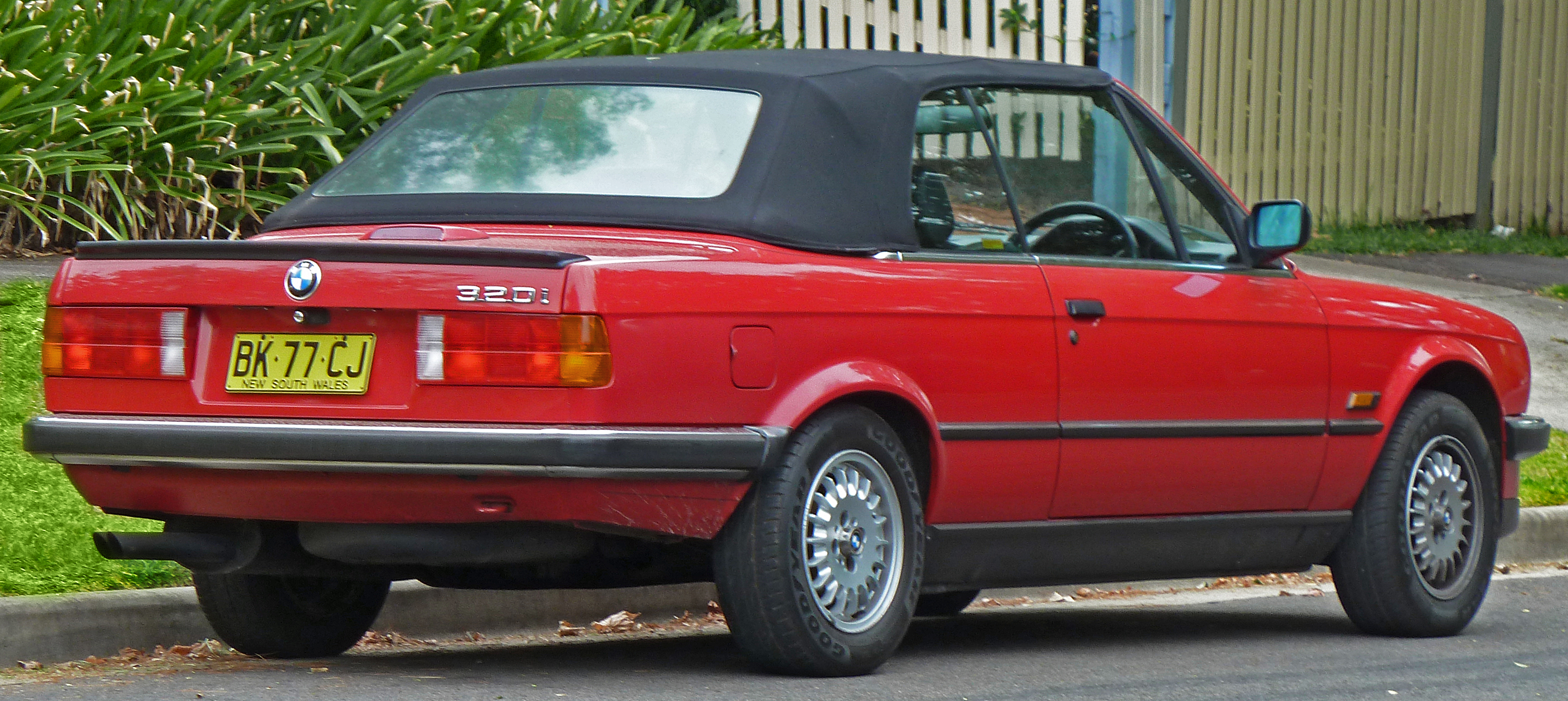
E30 convertible

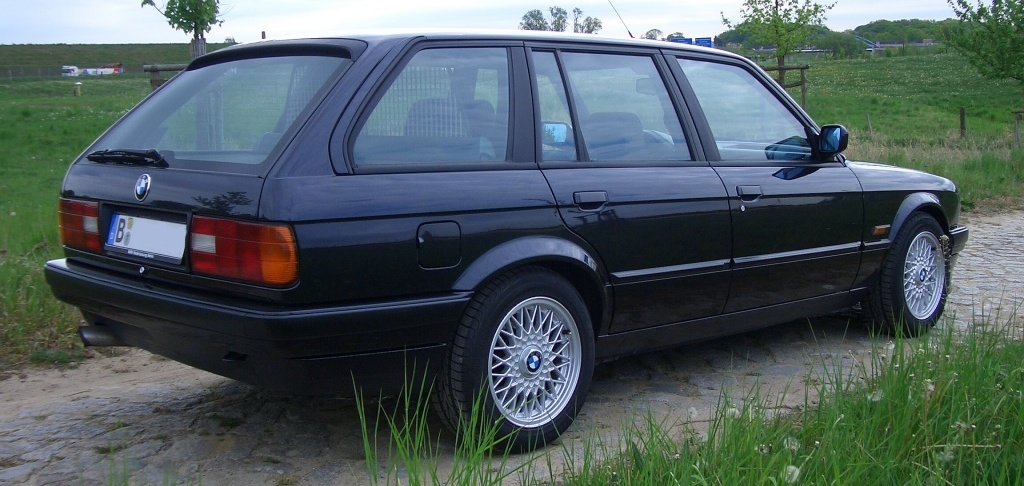
E30 wagon

== Engines ==
Initially, the E30 used carryover four-cylinder (M10) and six-cylinder (M20) petrol engines from its E21 predecessor. Over the production run, new families of four-cylinder petrol engines were introduced and the six-cylinder engine received various upgrades. A six-cylinder diesel engine was introduced, in both naturally aspirated and turbocharged forms.

Factory specifications are shown below.

Petrol Engines
Model	Years	Engine	Power	Torque
316s (Note: Greece and Yugoslavia only)	1982–1987	1.6 L M10B16 straight-4	55 kW (75 PS) at 5,800 rpm	110 N⋅m (81 lb⋅ft) at 3,200 rpm
316	1982–1988	1.8 L M10B18 straight-4	66 kW (90 PS) at 5,500 rpm	140 N⋅m (103 lb⋅ft) at 4,000 rpm
316i	1987–1994	1.6 L M40B16 straight-4 fuel injected	73 kW (100 PS) at 5,500 rpm	145 N⋅m (107 lb⋅ft) at 4,500 rpm
318i	1983–1987	1.8 L M10B18 straight-4 fuel injected	77 kW (105 PS) at 5,800 rpm (Note: With catalytic converter, built from 1984 until 1987: 75 kW (102 PS), 140 N⋅m (103 lb⋅ft))	145 N⋅m (107 lb⋅ft) at 4,500 rpm
318i	1987–1994	1.8 L M40B18 straight-4 fuel injected	83 kW (113 PS) at 5,500 rpm	162 N⋅m (119 lb⋅ft) at 4,250 rpm
318is	1989–1991	1.8 L M42B18 straight-4 fuel injected	100 kW (136 PS) at 6,000 rpm	172 N⋅m (127 lb⋅ft) at 4,600 rpm
320i	1982–1985	2.0 L M20B20 straight-6 fuel injected	92 kW (125 PS) at 5,800 rpm	170 N⋅m (125 lb⋅ft) at 4,000 rpm
320i	1985–1992	2.0 L M20B20 straight-6 fuel injected	95 kW (129 PS) at 6,000 rpm	164 N⋅m (121 lb⋅ft) at 4,300 rpm
320is	1987–1990	2.0 L S14B20 straight-4 fuel injected	143 kW (195 PS) at 6,750 rpm	210 N⋅m (155 lb⋅ft) at 4,750 rpm
323i	1982–1984	2.3 L M20 straight-6 fuel injected	102 kW (139 PS) at 5,300 rpm	205 N⋅m (151 lb⋅ft) at 4,000 rpm
323i	1984–1985	2.3 L M20 straight-6 fuel injected	110 kW (150 PS); 6,000 rpm	205 N⋅m (151 lb⋅ft) at 4,000 rpm
325, 325e, 325es	1985–1987	2.7 L M20B27 straight-6 fuel injected	90 kW (122 PS) at 4,250 rpm (Note: Without catalytic converter: 90 kW (122 PS), 240 N⋅m (177 lb⋅ft))	230 N⋅m (170 lb⋅ft) at 3,250 rpm
325, 325e, 325es	1988	2.7 L M20B27 straight-6 fuel injected	95 kW (129 PS) at 4,800 rpm	231 N⋅m (170 lb⋅ft) at 3,200 rpm
325i, 325is, 325ix	1985–1993	2.5 L M20B25 straight-6 fuel injected	125 kW (170 PS) at 5,800 rpm (Note: Without catalytic converter: 126 kW (171 PS), 226 N⋅m (167 lb⋅ft))	222 N⋅m (164 lb⋅ft) at 4,300 rpm
M3, M3 Evo 1	1986–1987	2.3 L S14B23 straight-4 fuel injected	143 kW (195 PS) at 6,750 rpm (Note: Without catalytic converter: 147 kW (200 PS), 240 N⋅m (177 lb⋅ft))	230 N⋅m (170 lb⋅ft) at 4,750 rpm
M3 Evo 2	1988	2.3 L S14B23 straight-4 fuel injected	162 kW (220 PS) at 6,750 rpm	245 N⋅m (181 lb⋅ft) at 4,750 rpm
M3 Sport Evo	1989–1990	2.5 L S14B25 straight-4 fuel injected	175 kW (238 PS) at 7,000 rpm	240 N⋅m (177 lb⋅ft) at 4,750 rpm

Diesel Engines
Model	Years	Engine	Power	Torque
324d	1985-1991	2.4 L M21D24 straight-6	63 kW (86 PS) at 4,600 rpm	152 N⋅m (112 lb⋅ft) at 2,500 rpm
324td	1987-1991	2.4 L M21D24 straight-6 turbo	85 kW (115 PS) at 4,800 rpm	210 N⋅m (155 lb⋅ft) at 2,400 rpm

=== Four-cylinder petrol ===
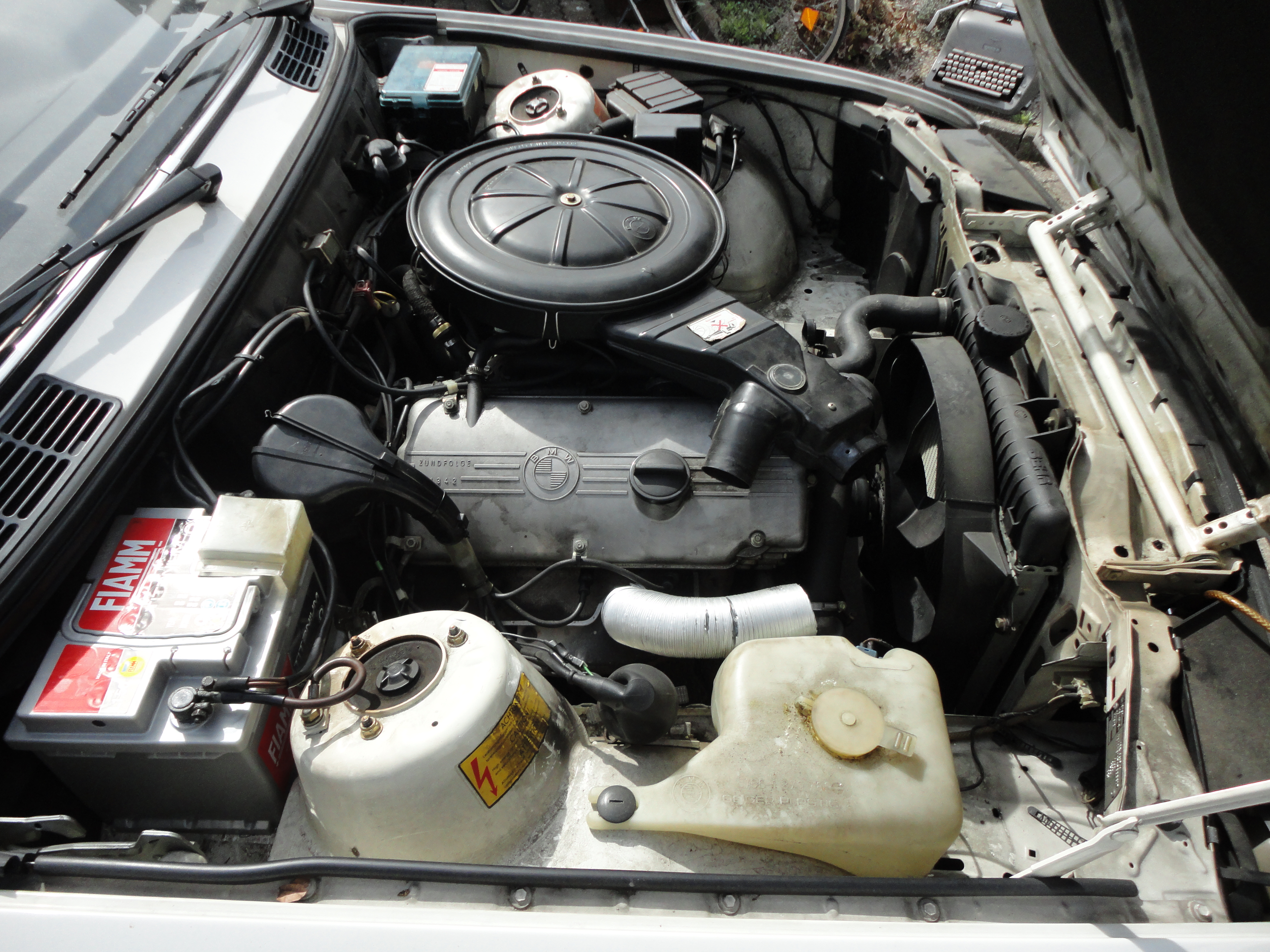
BMW M10 engine

At the launch of the E30 range in 1982, the 316 used a 1766 cc version of the M10 fed by a carburetor and producing 66 kW (90 PS). The 318i had the same M10 engine, but with Bosch L-Jetronic fuel-injection, increasing power to 77 kW (105 PS) while also improving fuel economy.

The 1987 Series 2 update introduced a new four-cylinder engine: the M40, which used Bosch Motronic fuel-injection. In the 318i, a 1,796 cc (110 cu in) version of the M40 was used. The 316i model replaced the 316, using a 1,596 cc (97 cu in) version of the M40. While smaller and less torquey than the 1.8-litre engine in the 316, it had higher peak power thanks to the fuel injection.

The 318iS was released in 1989, using the new M42 engine and only being available with two doors. This is the most modern engine available in the E30 range, incorporating DOHC, the updated Bosch Motronic 1.7, hydraulic valve adjusters and coil-on-plug ignition. In some markets, the M42 engine was used in the 318i models, instead of the M40.

The M3 is powered by the S14 engine, a high-revving four-cylinder engine.

=== Six-cylinder petrol ===
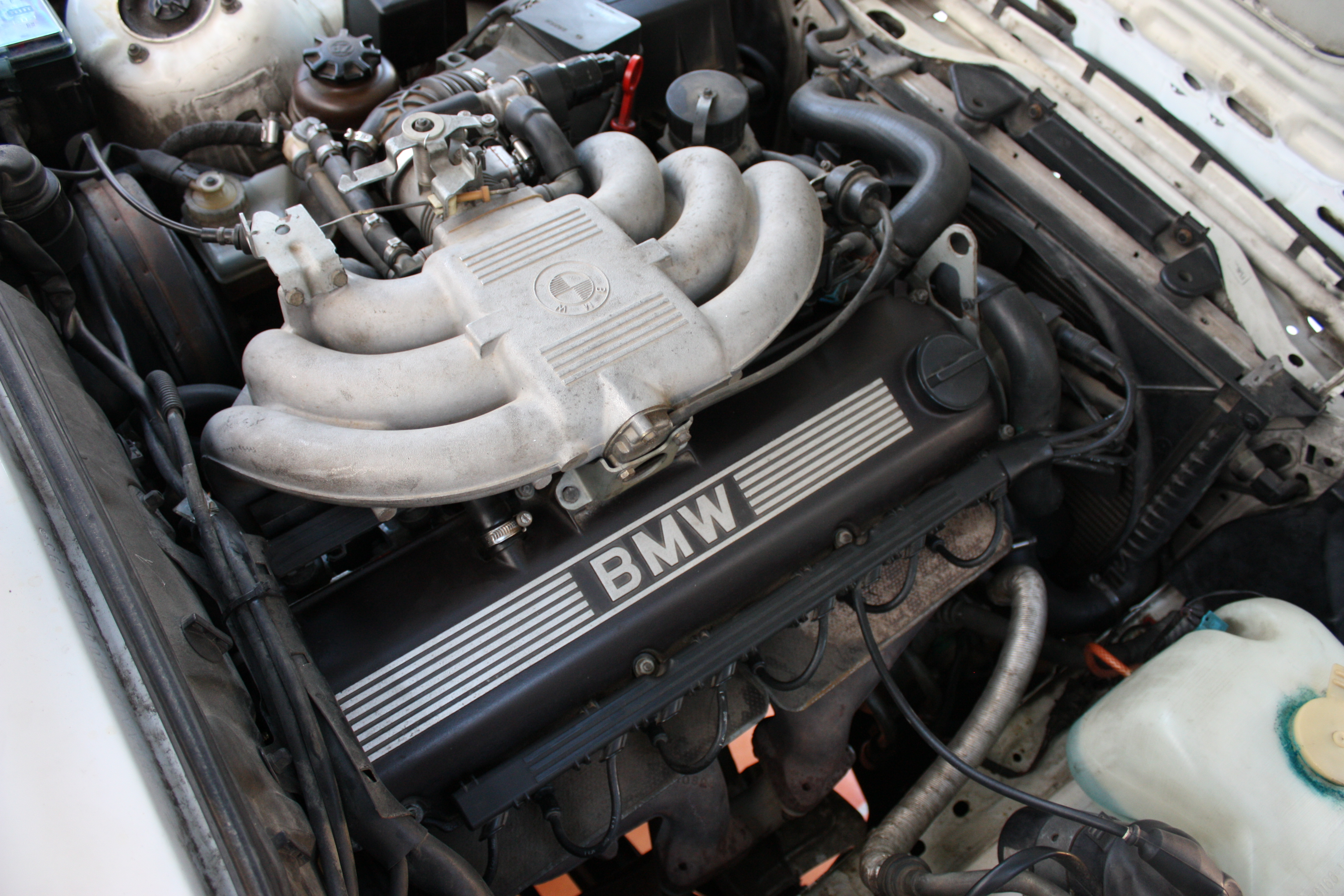
BMW M20 engine (325i version)

At the launch of the E30 range, the six-cylinder models consisted of the 320i, which had a 2.0 L (122 cu in) version of the M20 producing 92 kW (123 bhp), and the 323i, with a 2.3 L (140 cu in) M20 producing 102 kW (137 bhp), both using Bosch L-Jetronic fuel injection. These models were not sold in North America, presumably for emissions reasons. In 1985, the 2.3 L engine was replaced with a 2.5 L version of the M20, which produced 125 kW (168 bhp) and used Bosch Motronic fuel injection. This engine was available in the 325i variants, including the all-wheel drive 325iX.

An economy version called the 325e was released with a lower revving, more fuel efficient engine. The e is an abbreviation for eta, which is used to represent the thermal efficiency of a heat engine. To maximise low-rev torque, the 325e engine was the largest available in an E30 (aside from the 333i model, which was only sold in South Africa). The 325e engine had a longer stroke than the 325i version, with a more restrictive head, four cam bearings instead of seven, and single valve springs (instead of the dual valve springs used by the 325i version). In European specifications, with a catalytic converter, the 325e engine produced 90 kW (122 PS; 121 bhp) at 4250 rpm and 230 N⋅m (170 lbf⋅ft) at 3250 rpm. By comparison, peak torque for the 325i engine was 215 N⋅m (159 lb⋅ft) at 4000 rpm.

The 1987 Series 2 update boosted the 320i to 95 kW (127 hp) and the 325i to 125 kW (168 hp), and improved fuel economy.

=== Six-cylinder diesel ===
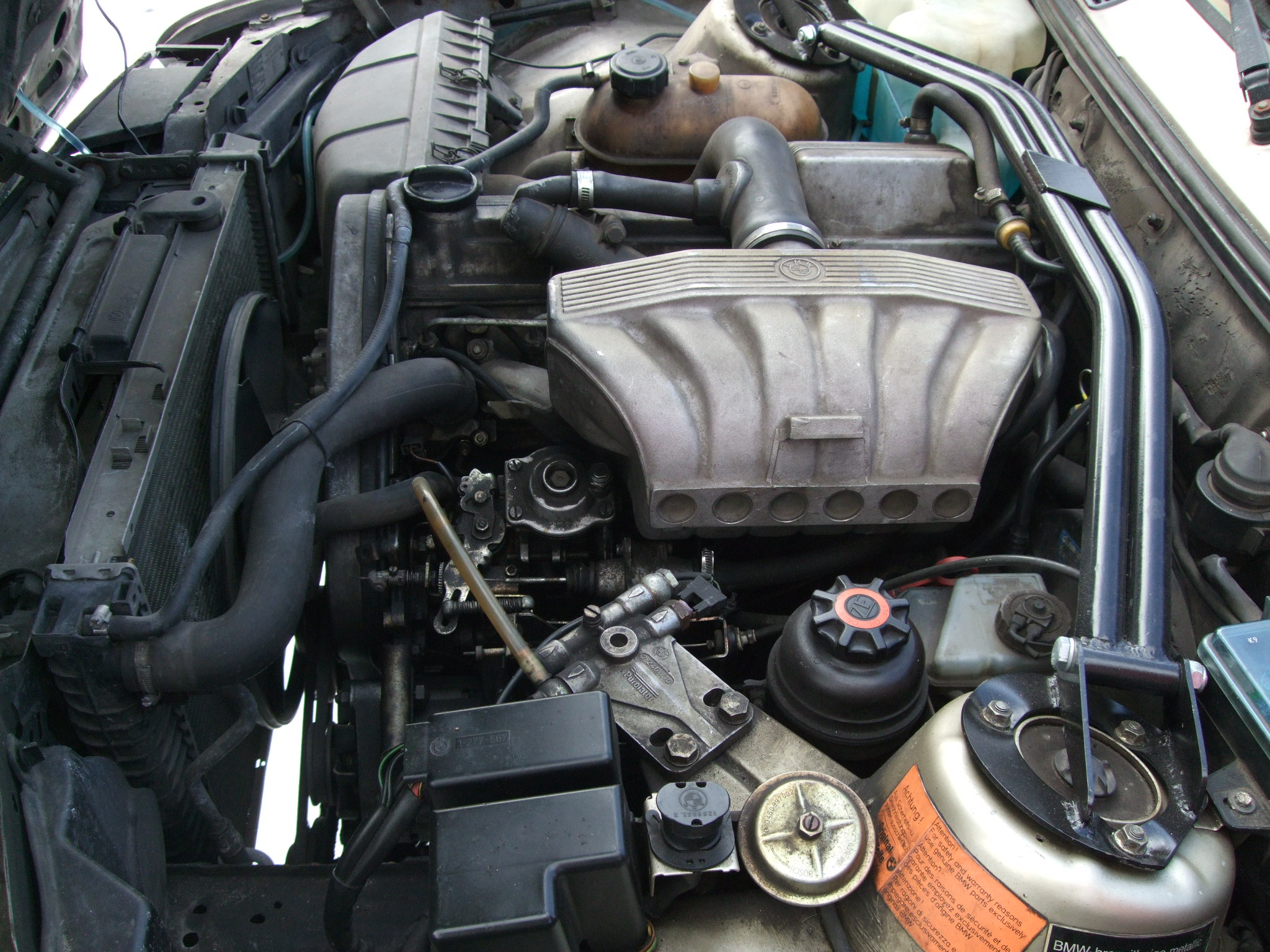
BMW M21 engine used in the 324d and 324td models

In 1983 the M21 engine was unveiled in the new 524td at the IAA in West Germany. The turbocharged engine has a capacity of 2,443 cc (149 cu in) and uses mechanical fuel injection; when the M21 engine found its way into the 3-series it was in naturally aspirated form: in 1985 BMW introduced the 324d, which proved popular in countries with a high motor vehicle tax.

In 1987 the turbocharged 324td was introduced to coincide with the facelift. By now, an electronically controlled fuel pump was used, which increased the torque output vis-à-vis the 524td by 10 N⋅m (7 lb⋅ft). The updated engine also has a smaller turbocharger, decreasing turbo lag.

== Drivetrain ==
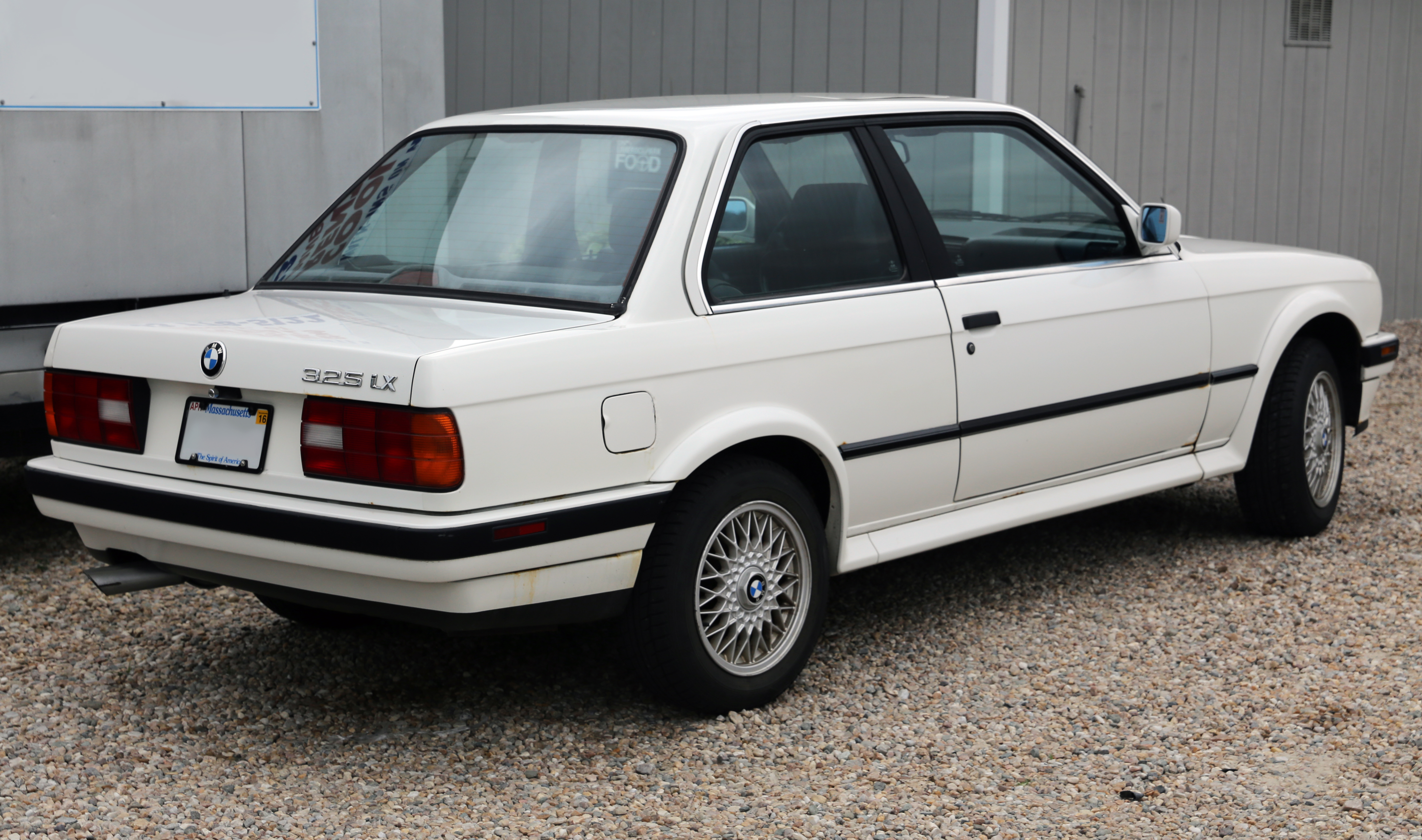
BMW E30 325iX (US; final facelift version)

In total, six transmissions were available for the various models of the E30: four manuals, and two automatics. The E30 was offered with rear-wheel drive, or permanent all-wheel drive (325iX saloons and estates only).

=== Manual transmissions ===
- 4-speed Getrag 242 — 316 and 318i models
- 5-speed Getrag 240 — 316, 318i and 320i models (with a different bellhousing for the 320i, to suit the BMW M20 engine, and another different bellhousing to suit the later M42-engined 318i/is).
- 5-speed Getrag 260 — 323i, 325e, 325es and 325i models.
- 5-speed Getrag 265 — M3 model (dog-leg shift pattern for European models and a standard H-pattern for North American models).

=== Automatic transmissions ===
- 3-speed ZF 3HP22 — 1981 to 1985.
- 4-speed ZF 4HP22 — 320i and 323i models until 1985, available on all models from 1985 onwards.

== Suspension ==
One of the features that added to the roominess of the E30 was the suspension. The front MacPherson struts and rear semi-trailing arm suspension were a compact arrangement that left a lot of cabin and boot space for the car's overall size. The semi-trailing arms have been criticized for the dynamic toe and camber changes inherent to the suspension geometry, causing bump steer in hard cornering situations (such as racing and autocross). Nonetheless, reviewers praised the handling of the E30.

A widened version of the E30 front suspension and the drivetrain from the E30 325i were used in the BMW Z1 roadster. The BMW Z3 and BMW Compact (E36/5) rear suspensions are also very similar to the E30, but utilizing five-lug hubs. The Z3-based BMW M Coupé uses a widened version of the same rear semi-trailing arm suspension along with stronger hubs.

== Brakes ==
For the front wheels, all models use disc brakes. Early 316/318 models have solid discs, while all subsequent models have vented discs. For the rear wheels, most models use solid disc brakes, except for some four-cylinder models which use rear drum brakes. Anti-lock braking system (ABS) became available in 1986.

== Model range ==
=== United States & Canada ===
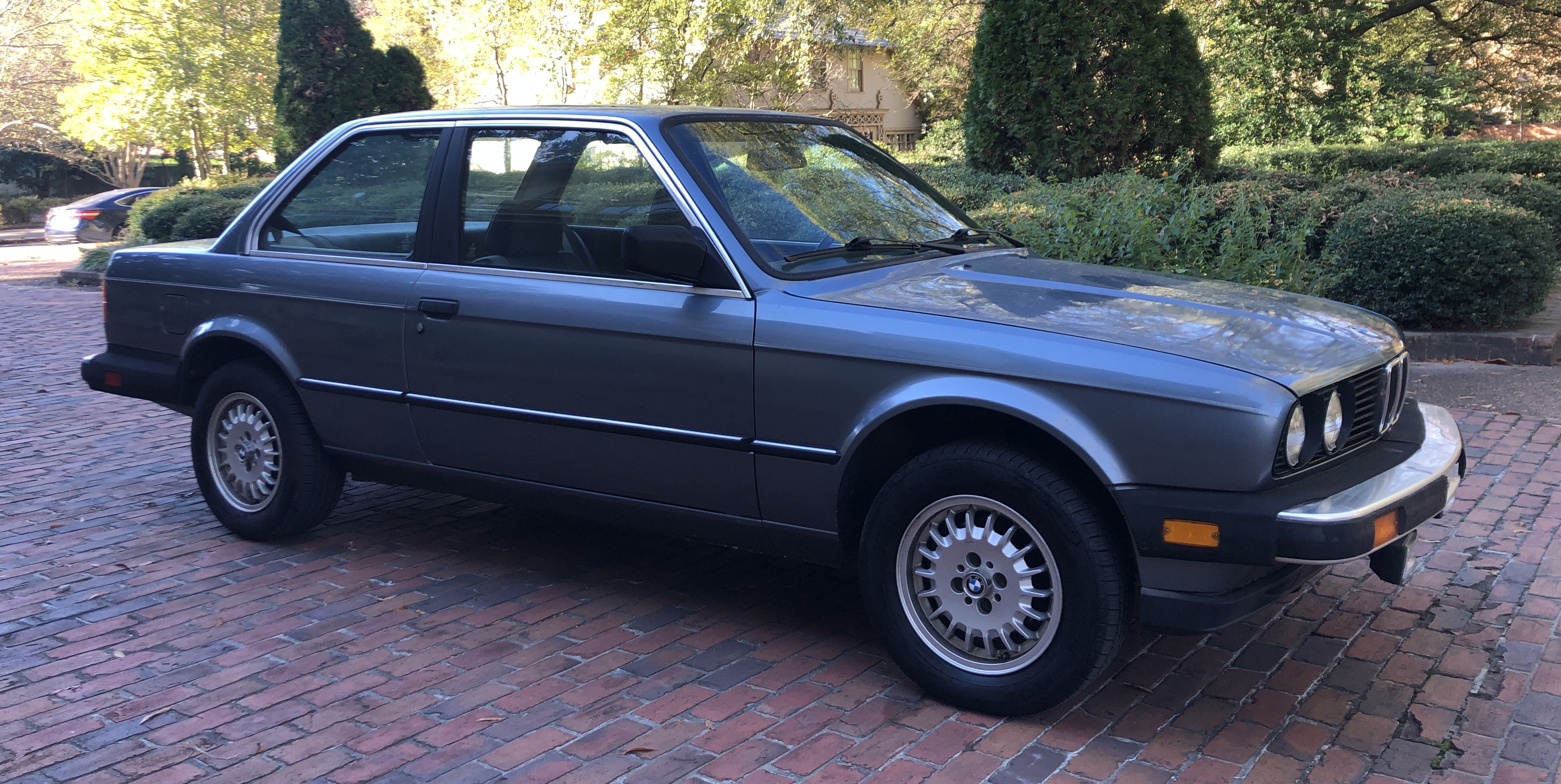
1984–1987 North American model (note the large bumpers)

The model range in the United States consisted of the following:

- 318i (1984–1985 using the M10 engine, then 1991 using the M42 engine)
- 318is (1991 only)
- 325, 325e and 325es (1984–1988)
- 325i, 325is (1987–1991 only)
- 325ix (1988–1991 only)

The primary distinctive feature of the BMW E30 models produced for the North American market in 1984–1987 is the protruding front and rear aluminum bumpers. These bumpers are commonly known as "diving boards." In 1987, the anodized aluminum bumpers for the North American market were shortened by revising the cover/fillers and shortening the shock absorbers on which they were mounted. In 1988, the front and rear valances were updated along with the rear wheel arch. In 1989, shorter body-coloured plastic bumpers replaced the aluminium ones altogether.

=== South Africa ===
In South Africa, only the two-door and four-door saloons were built, four-cylinder petrol models production continued there until 1992.

Despite the introduction of the M40 engine, the old M10-powered 316 continued to be sold in South Africa until 1991, gaining the new bumpers when the range was updated.

There were notable special editions built. Since no E30 M3 was destined for South Africa, BMW SA and Alpina collaborated to create the 333i, a local Group N racing homologation special. The local 325is also differed from those sold in the rest of world, being fitted with 2.7 litre Alpina M20B25 engines.

== M3 model ==
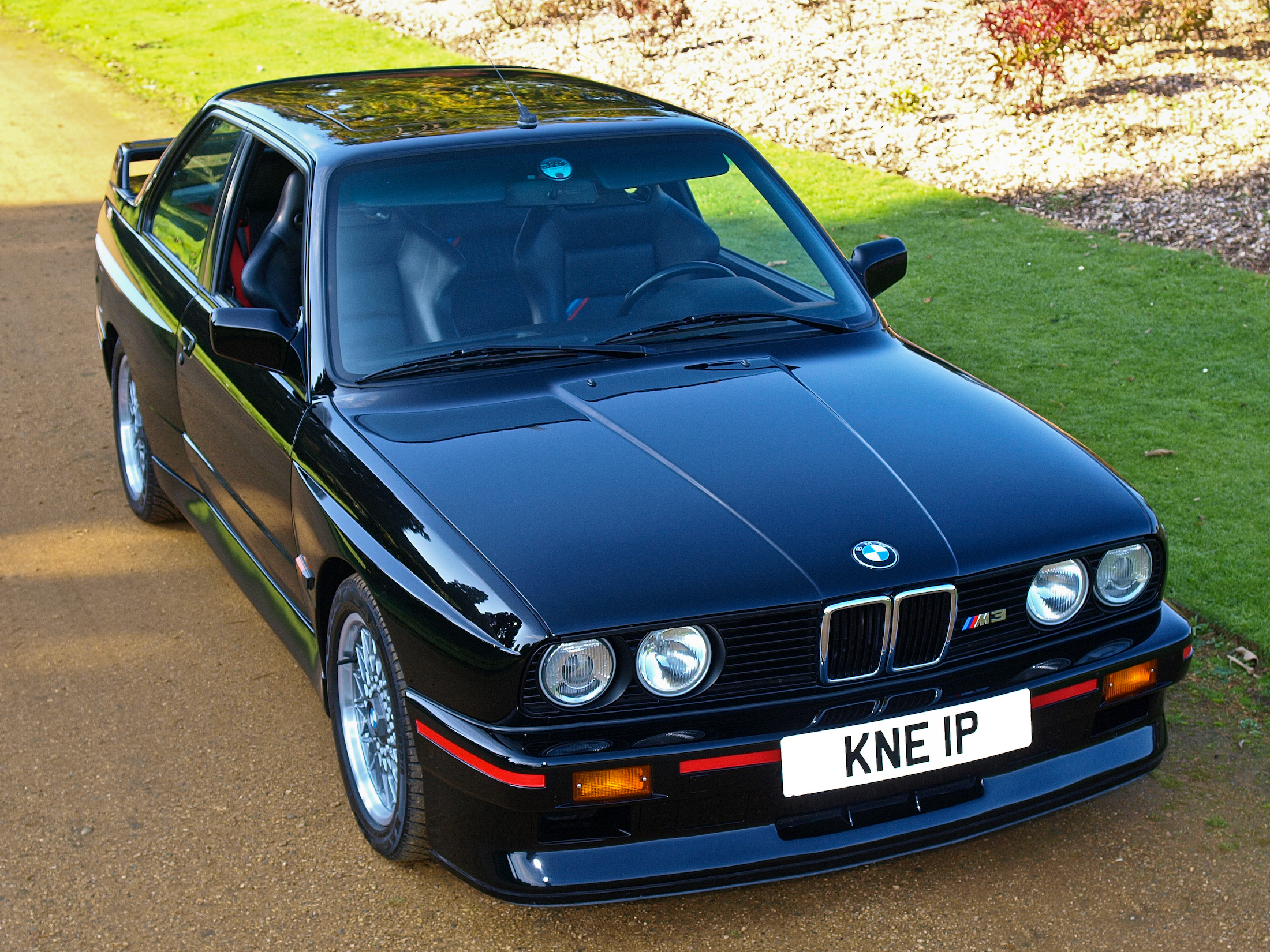
BMW E30 "M3 Sport Evolution"

The BMW M3 utilised a widened and heavily redesigned variation of the two-door body style, therefore the M3 shares few body parts with other E30 models. The M3 suspension is also significantly different from regular E30 models, including five-lug wheel bolts.

== Alpina models ==
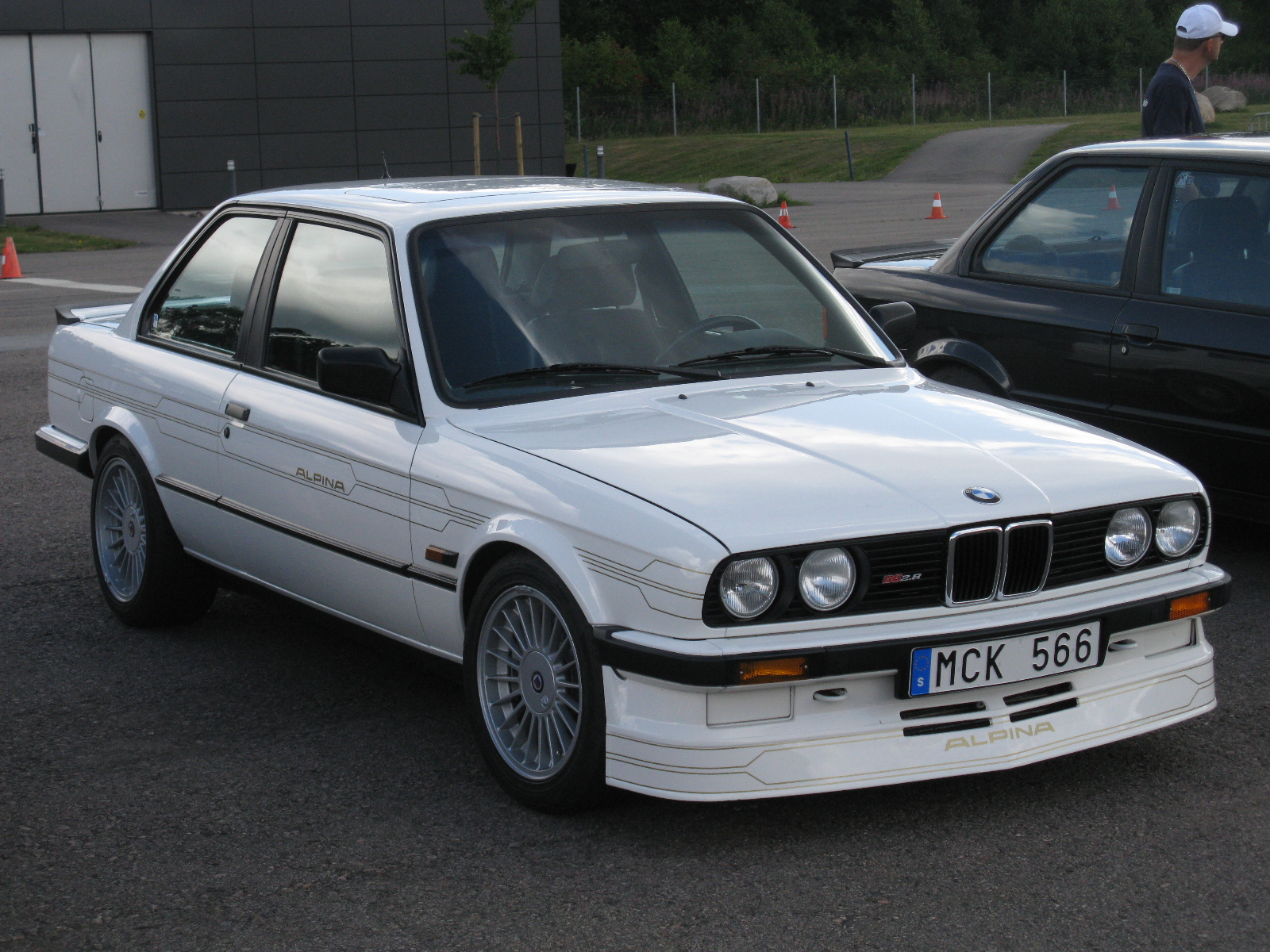
Alpina B6 2.8

The Alpina C1, C2, B3 and B6 models were based on the E30.

== Special models ==
=== 320is ===
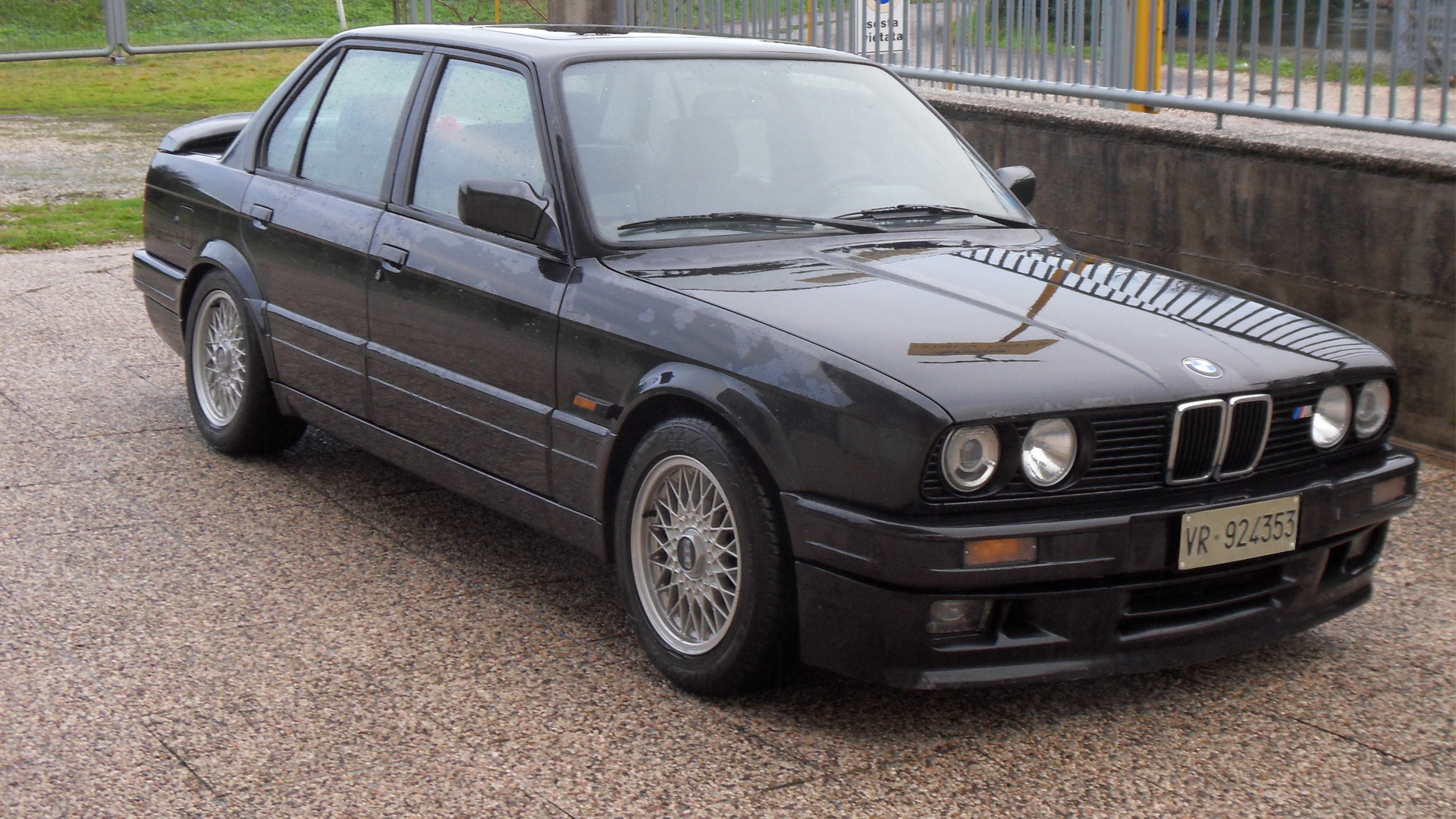
BMW E30 320is saloon (1990)

For Portugal and Italy only, due to considerably higher taxes for cars with engines exceeding 2000 cc, a special model was created: the 320is. The four-door version appeared in the dealers' showrooms in September 1987 while the two-door followed in March 1988. Production of the 320is continued until 1991, with 1,206 four-doors and 2,542 two-doors produced.

This model was equipped with a 2.0 L (1,990 cc) version of the S14 engine from the M3, with stroke reduced to 72.6 mm (2.86 in). This engine produces 141 kW (192 PS) at 6900 rpm and 212 N⋅m (156 lb⋅ft) at 4,900 rpm. The 320is shared the same dogleg Getrag 265 gearbox of the non-US M3 while it had a limited-slip differential with the same 25 percent lock up rate, but with a shorter differential ratio of 3.46:1. All the 320is models were left hand drive and without a catalytic converter. Sports suspension was fitted to all two-door models, and to four-doors produced from September 1989.

The interior of the 320is was identical to that of other 3 Series models, except for using an M3 instrument cluster, which features an oil temperature gauge instead of a fuel economy gauge.

=== M325i ===
In New Zealand, where the M3 was never sold by BMW, the local importer created a sporting version of the saloon called M325i. About 100 such cars were imported beginning in late 1986 until at least 1990. Fitted with the standard, non-catalyzed 125 kW (170 PS; 168 bhp) 2.5-litre engine they benefited from a Motorsport tuned suspension, the M-Technic body package, 15-inch BBS cross-spoke wheels with wide, low profile (225/50) tyres, and a limited-slip differential. The M325i is quite similar to the British market 325i Sport, also developed as a response to the absence of a right-hand-drive M3.

=== 333i ===
BMW South Africa's Motorsport division created the 333i in 1985 by fitting the 3.2 L M30 "big six" engine to a two-door E30. The resulting 333i was a success in South African saloon car racing. These cars were built with help from Alpina in Buchloe, West Germany. Due to the space constraints caused by the large M30 engine, the buyer was forced to choose between air conditioning (highly desirable in South Africa) and power steering. Cars with power steering are distinguished by having foglights, cars with air-conditioning instead had ducts providing fresh air for the air-conditioning. The 333i was produced from 1985 to 1987 and only 210 cars were produced. (6 factory race cars, and 204 Homologation Specials for Local Group N racing.

The 333i engine produces 145 kW (197 PS) at 5500 rpm and 285 N⋅m (210 lb⋅ft) at 4300 rpm. BMW's official performance claims are 0–100 km/h (0–62 mph) in 7.4 seconds, and a top speed of 228 km/h (142 mph).

=== South African 325iS ===
The 325iS was created by BMW South Africa to replace the 2.5 litre 126 kW 325i in Group N production car racing, as a response to the introduction of the Opel Kadett 2 litre 16V to the Class A category. Early 325iS cars had a 2.5 litre motor, and various weight lightening interventions including alloy doors and drilled out sections in boot hinges and other steel pressings. The 2.7 litre 325iS, commonly called Evo 2, replaced the 'Evo 1' cars, Evo 2 cars had standard steel doors and bonnet. It was launched in the first half of 1990 and was powered by an Alpina-fettled, 2.7 litre M20 engine which produced 145 kW (197 PS). Following the introduction of the upgraded Opel Kadett 16V SuperBoss, in 1991 BMW South Africa introduced the 325iS Evolution HP, commonly referred to as the Evo 2. The motor was upgraded to produce 155 kW (211 PS).

The Evolution HP won the Group N Class A title in 1993, winning 20 of the 24 races in the process. The Robbi Smith and Geoff Goddard Evolution HP won the season-ending 9hr race.

=== 323i JPS ===
The John Player Special Edition is an Australian-only limited edition special offered by BMW Australia as a tribute to the M3 race cars competing in local touring car racing. JPS refers to the BMW race team sponsor, John Player Special cigarettes. The cars were based on two-door 323i with manual transmission, painted in black with gold pinstripes and gold BBS wheels. They also had Recaro sports seats, JPS badging, a limited-slip differential, sports suspension, a sunroof (optional) and a body kit. The cars were ordered from the factory as a base 323i in black with a fixed selection of options - all of which were otherwise available to order but priced at a substantial discount as an Edition package. The pinstripes were added in Australia and the wheels were also gold anodised in Australia. The production run was 70 cars.

== Production ==
The E30 was produced in Munich, West Germany; Regensburg, West Germany; and Rosslyn, South Africa. Series production began in October 1982.

Models sold in Indonesia and Thailand used complete knock-down kits produced in Germany, which were assembled in Jakarta and Bangkok respectively.

Production volumes
Year	Units
1982	15,580
1983	218,201
1984	285,134
1985	297,886
1986	329,460
1987	316,075
1988	269,074
1989	257,307
1990	246,818
1991	56,363
1992	26,913
1993	18,440
1994	1,997
Total	2,433,000

Production of the E30 began to wind down in 1990, due to the introduction of the E36 3 Series coupé models. Production of the regular two-door saloons concluded on April 30, 1991, at Regensburg. Sporting variants like 325is evolution 1 and 2 and some others continued to be produced until 1992. Four-door sedan production concluded in February 29, 1992, for all markets. Production of US-spec models was concluded in 1991.

Convertibles were built from late 1990 to 1993. Tourings (station wagons) were built from 1988 to 1994. Other variants were phased out gradually, until the final E30 model, a Touring, was produced in 1994, and sold as a 1995 model year.

== Motorsports ==
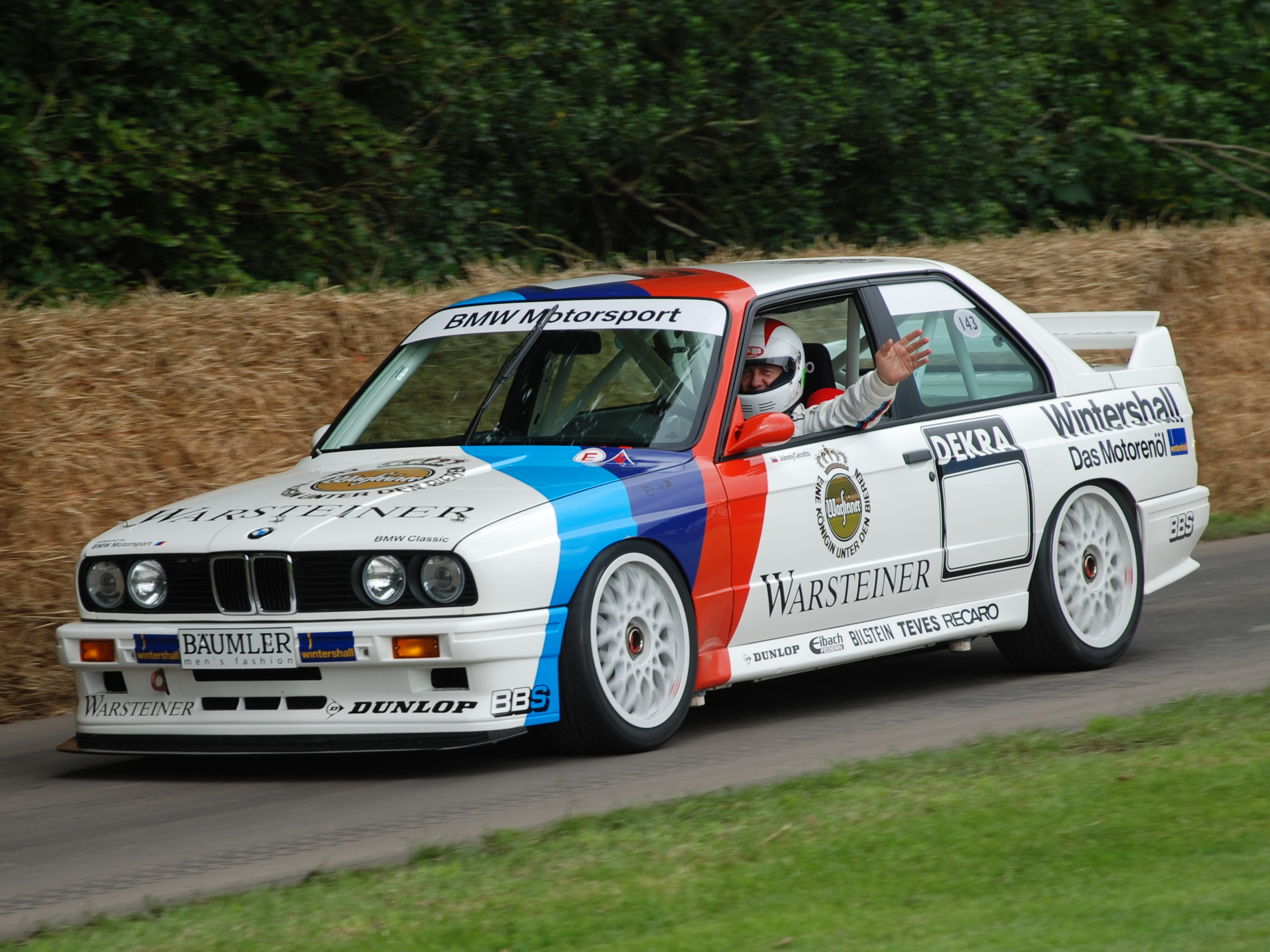
E30 M3 DTM touring car

The E30 M3 was very successful in Touring car racing.

The E30 remains a popular car for racing and E30-specific racing series such as the National Auto Sport Association's Spec E30 class are run in the United States, Australia and New Zealand.
