= Kugelfischer =

Kugelfischer injection (also called System Kugelfischer) is the name for a mechanical fuel injection (MFI) pump. It was produced by FAG Kugelfischer and later by Robert Bosch GmbH Derived from diesel pumps from the early 1960s, the Kugelfischer system was a mechanical injection pump for performance vehicles. It was among the first units with manufacturer-customizable fuel delivery maps which used rpm, throttle position, temperature, and sometimes barometric pressure as inputs. This was accomplished mechanically, not electronically, using cones (irregularly shaped, two-dimensional cams) to encode the maps.

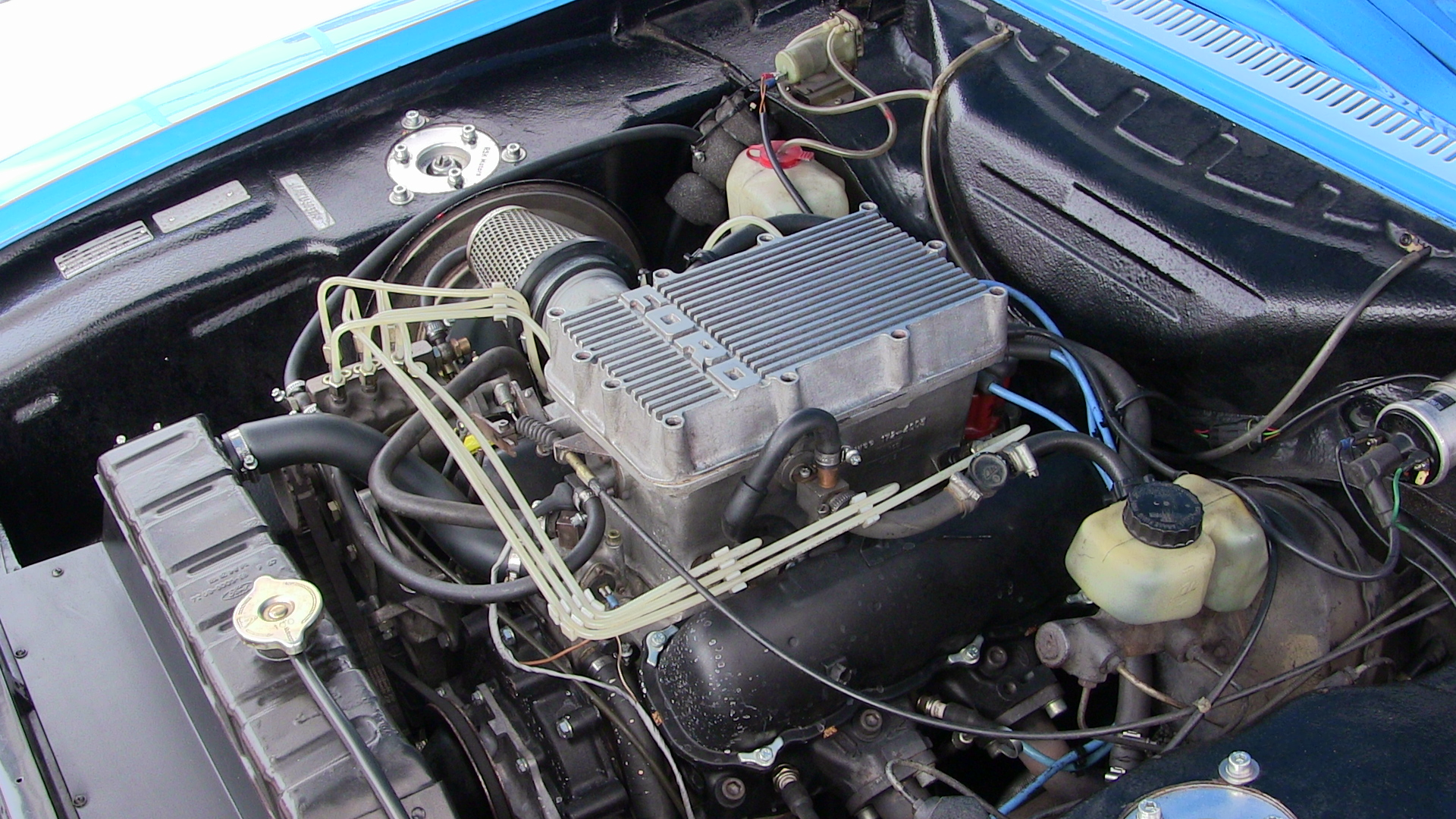
Ford Capri RS2600 engine with a Kugelfischer injection pump visible next to the upper radiator hose

In the late 1960s and early 1970s, it was fitted to a variety of production vehicles from BMW, Ford UK, Lancia, Peugeot - 404 and 504 between 1961 and 1983, and others. It is perhaps best known for its use by BMW in the 2000tii/2002tii (and later, the 2002 Turbo) from 1970 to 1975, the 1964–1976 Porsche 911/911S/Carrera RS/RSR/Carrera MFI, and the BMW M1 supercar from 1978 to 1981. Due to high manufacturing cost however, it became economically undesirable with the introduction of cheaper electronic engine management systems (and continuous-injection mechanical systems) by the end of the decade. However, the Kugelfischer system continued to be used as a specialty injection pump for purpose-built race engines into the 1980s such as the 1982 Porsche 911 SC/RS.
