= Alpina =

High-performance luxury cars brand by BMW

BMW Alpina
- Formerly: Alpina (1965–2025)
- Type: Brand
- Industry: Automotive
- Predecessor: Alpina Burkard Bovensiepen
- Founded: 1965 (as a company); 2026 (as a brand)
- Founder: Burkard Bovensiepen
- Headquarters: Munich, Germany
- Key people: Andreas Bovensiepen (CEO)
- Products: Automobiles
- Parent: BMW
- Website: www.bmwalpina.com

Alpina is a high-end luxury automobile brand by BMW. Alpina originally started as an automobile manufacturing company named Alpina Burkard Bovensiepen, based in Buchloe, in the Ostallgäu district of Bavaria, Germany that develops and sells high-performance versions of BMW cars. The company was officially renamed BMW Alpina in 2025. Alpina works closely with BMW and their processes are integrated into BMW's production lines, and is recognized by the German Ministry of Transport as an automobile manufacturer, in contrast to other performance specialists, which are aftermarket tuners. The Alpina B7 was produced at the same assembly line in Dingolfing, Germany (BMW Plant Dingolfing), as BMW's own 7 Series. The B7's twin-turbo 4.4-litre V8 was assembled by hand at Alpina's facility in Buchloe, Germany, before being shipped to BMW for installation, and the assembled vehicle is then sent back to Alpina for finishing touches.

The firm was founded in 1965 by Burkard Bovensiepen (1936–2023), a member of the Bovensiepen family of industrialists. On 10 March 2022, BMW announced its intention to acquire Alpina. That same day, BMW wrote on its website that it had officially acquired the brand.

== History ==
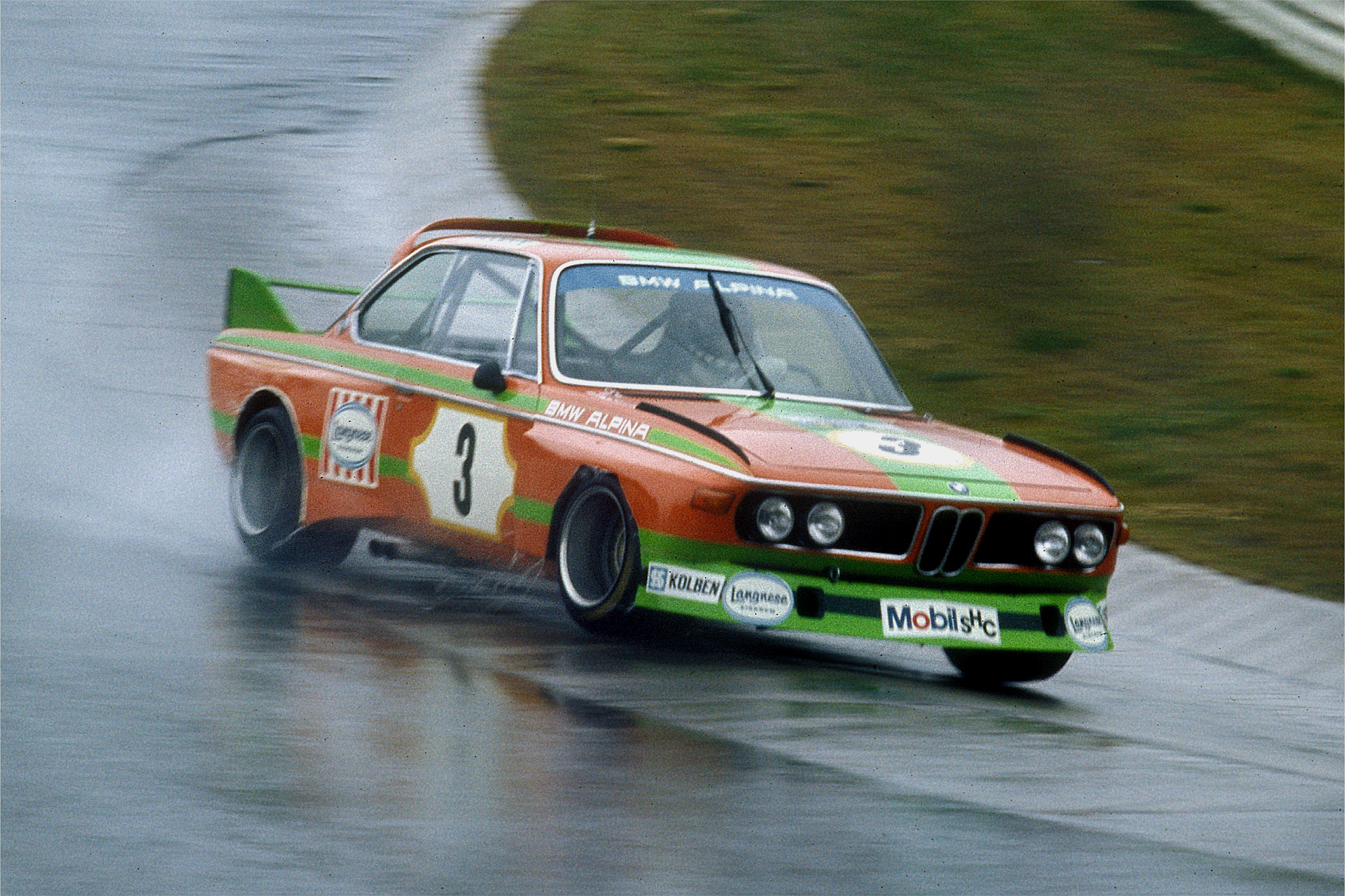
BMW Alpina 3.0 CSL (1974), driven by Helmut Koinigg

Alpina's roots can be traced back to 1962, when Burkard Bovensiepen developed a Weber dual carburetor for the BMW 1500. This carburetor was well received by the automotive press, as well as BMW's own sales boss Paul G. Hahnemann. In 1964, BMW certified the quality of this Alpina product by awarding BMW vehicles fitted with the Alpina system the full factory guarantee.

Alpina Burkard Bovensiepen KG was established on 1 January 1965 in Kaufbeuren, Bavaria. The company had eight employees. Although Alpina started by producing typewriters, the original Alpina ceased to exist at the end of the 1960s in their attempt to move into the textile industry. In 1965, Burkard established a BMW tuning business, following his success with investments in the stock market. He started the tuning business in an outbuilding of the original Alpina typewriter factory. The company worked on carburetors and revised cylinder heads. By 1970, with seventy employees, the original facility changed locations from Kaufbeuren to Buchloe.

In its first years, Alpina established its core competency by tuning carburetors and camshafts to extract more power from BMW engines, elements that eventually defined the company's logo, which came into being in 1967. Between 1968 and 1977, Alpina cars did very well in competition. The highlight was in 1970, when the team's cars won the European Touring Car Championship, the German Hillclimb Championship, rally and track racing championships, and the prestigious Spa 24 Hours.

Alpina officially withdrew from racing in 1988 because of capacity limitations and restrictions. Tied to this was the decision to begin production of a new set of BMW Alpina automobiles.

== Brand distinctions ==
Since 1983, Alpina has been recognized by the German Federal Ministry of Transport as an automobile manufacturer, thus Alpina-built cars are branded and registered as Alpina instead of BMW, although an Alpina can be serviced at all BMW dealerships, and is fully covered if a warranty issue arises. Alpina automobiles are also sold at some BMW dealerships.

Distinctive features of Alpina vehicles are the fact that these models are literally "manu-factured", meaning "hand-made". The production process switches between fine tuning the engine, delivering it to the BMW plant, marrying engine and body there, and bringing it back to Alpina for interior upgrade with Alpina's specific components, again all in a hand-made process that allows only limited production numbers. Besides engine and interior, Alpina also optimizes the transmission and installs steering wheel-mounted button shifters (called Switch-Tronic) on most cars, with paddle shifters used on the B4 S Edition 99. This has historic reasons, since Alpina was the first to mount shifting buttons on the steering wheel. Distinguishing marks from the exterior are the 20-spoke alloy wheels with hidden valves under the center cap and the "Alpina Blue" or "Alpina Green" metallic exterior colours. Inside, "the finest materials are used to fabricate the exclusive feel". A typical blue and green pattern is often used on interior parts such as stitching on leather. A thin, pinstriped style outside body decor set in gold or silver is also a hallmark of older Alpina cars which is an option on new Alpina models. Another distinguishing mark is the Alpina wordmark at the bottom of the car's front, a design heralded from its racing cars. A metal plate inside also proves the heritage and the serial number of the car.

Compared to cars from BMW's in-house performance subsidiary, BMW M, Alpina's vehicles have more emphasis on Touring, higher torque, and have their own Alpina-style shiftable ZF automatic transmissions instead of manual or semi-automatic transmissions. For instance, regarding the high performance variants of the BMW E60 5 Series, the B5 offers a different take on performance and how to accomplish it. Unlike BMW M's own M5 which has a naturally aspirated, high-revving 5.0L V10, the Alpina B5 uses a supercharged 4.4L V8 which produces similar horsepower and greater torque at lower rpm.

== Current lineup ==
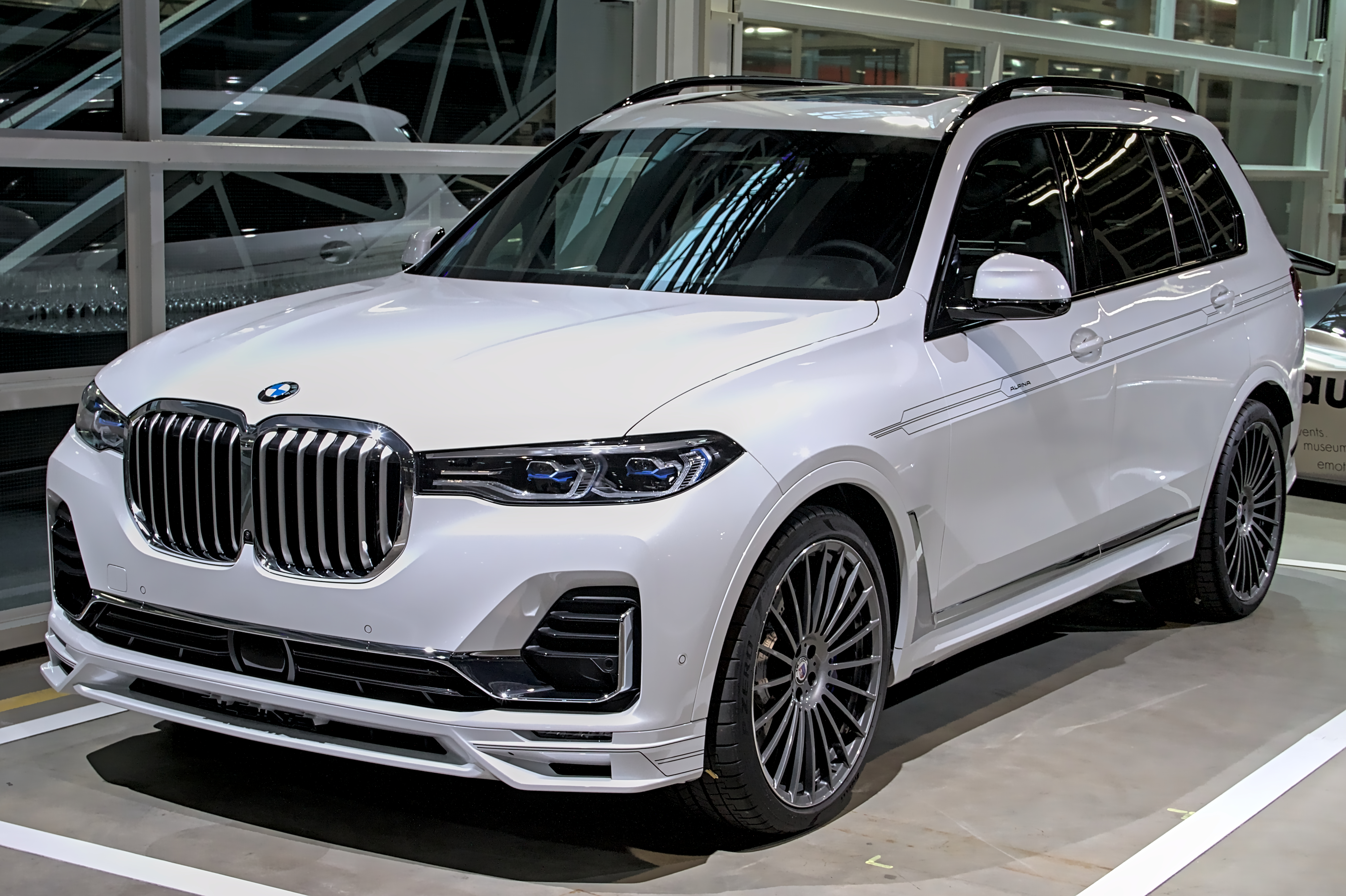
Alpina XB7

- Alpina XB7: based on the BMW G07 X7 - featuring a 4.4 L V8 bi-turbo engine producing 621 PS (457 kW; 612 hp) / 800 N⋅m (590 lb⋅ft)

== Previous models ==
=== Petrol-engine ===
Alpina Previous Models (Petrol engines)
Alpina model	BMW donor model	Alpina Engine	Power at rpm	Torque at rpm	Production
A1/3	E21 320	A1/3	90 kW (122 PS; 121 bhp) at 5,800	170 N⋅m (125 ft⋅lbf) at 4,000	1975–1977
A2/3	E21 320	A2/3	112 kW (152 PS; 150 bhp) at 6,900	173 N⋅m (128 ft⋅lbf) at 5,500	1975–1977
A4/3	E21 320i	A4/3	119 kW (162 PS; 160 bhp) at 6,700	180 N⋅m (133 ft⋅lbf) at 5,500	1976–1977
A4S/3	E21 320i	A4S/3	125 kW (170 PS; 168 bhp) at 6,700	180 N⋅m (133 ft⋅lbf) at 5,500	1976–1977
B7 Turbo Coupé	E24 630CSi	B7	221 kW (300 PS; 296 bhp) at 6,000	462 N⋅m (341 ft⋅lbf) at 2,500	1978–1982
B6 2.8	E21 323i	B6	147 kW (200 PS; 197 bhp) at 6,200	248 N⋅m (183 ft⋅lbf) at 4,500	1978–1981
B7 Turbo	E12 528i	B7	221 kW (300 PS; 296 bhp) at 6,000	462 N⋅m (341 ft⋅lbf) at 3,000	1978–1982
C1 2.3	E21 323i	C1	125 kW (170 PS; 168 bhp) at 6,000	210 N⋅m (155 ft⋅lbf) at 4,500	1980–1983
B7 S Turbo	E12 528i	B7S	243 kW (330 PS; 326 bhp) at 5,800	500 N⋅m (369 ft⋅lbf) at 3,000	1981–1982
B9 3.5	E28 528i	B9	180 kW (245 PS; 241 bhp) at 5,700	320 N⋅m (236 ft⋅lbf) at 4,000	1981–1983
B6 2.8	E21 323i	B6	160 kW (218 PS; 215 bhp) at 6,000	265 N⋅m (195 ft⋅lbf) at 5,000	1981–1983
B7 S Turbo Coupé	E24 635CSi	B7S	243 kW (330 PS; 326 bhp) at 5,800	500 N⋅m (369 ft⋅lbf) at 3,000	1982-1982
B9 3.5 Coupé	E24 635CSi	B9	180 kW (245 PS; 241 bhp) at 5,700	320 N⋅m (236 ft⋅lbf) at 4,000	1982-1982
B9 3.5 Coupé / 1	E24 635CSi	B9/1	180 kW (245 PS; 241 bhp) at 5,700	320 N⋅m (236 ft⋅lbf) at 4,000	1982–1985
C1 2.3 / 1	E30 323i	C1/1	125 kW (170 PS; 168 bhp) at 6,000	225 N⋅m (166 ft⋅lbf) at 5,000	1983–1985
B9 3.5 / 1	E28 528i	B9/1	180 kW (245 PS; 241 bhp) at 5,700	320 N⋅m (236 ft⋅lbf) at 4,000	1983–1985
B6 2.8 / 1	E30 323i/325i	B6/2	154 kW (209 PS; 207 bhp) at 6,100	270 N⋅m (199 ft⋅lbf) at 5,000	1984–1986
B7 Turbo Coupé / 1	E24 635CSi	B7/2	243 kW (330 PS; 326 bhp) at 5,700	512 N⋅m (378 ft⋅lbf) at 2,400	1984–1987
B7 Turbo / 1	E28 528i/535i	B7/1	221 kW (300 PS; 296 bhp) at 5,800	501 N⋅m (370 ft⋅lbf) at 3,000	1984–1987
B10 3.5	E28 535i	B10	192 kW (261 PS; 257 bhp) at 5,800	346 N⋅m (255 ft⋅lbf) at 4,000	1985–1987
C2 2.5	E30 325i	C2	136 kW (185 PS; 182 bhp) at 5,800	246 N⋅m (181 ft⋅lbf) at 4,800	1985-1986
B6 3.5	E30 323i/325i	B10/2	192 kW (261 PS; 257 bhp) at 6,000	346 N⋅m (255 ft⋅lbf) at 4,000	1985–1987
B7 Turbo / 1	E28 535i	B7/3	235 kW (320 PS; 315 bhp) at 5,700	520 N⋅m (384 ft⋅lbf) at 2,400	1986–1987
B7 Turbo Coupé / 1	E24 635CSi	B7/3	235 kW (320 PS; 315 bhp) at 5,700	520 N⋅m (384 ft⋅lbf) at 2,400	1986–1988
B6 3.5	E30 325i	B10/3	187 kW (254 PS; 251 bhp) at 5,900	320 N⋅m (236 ft⋅lbf) at 4,000	1986–1987
C1 2.5	E30 325i	C2/3	140 kW (190 PS; 188 bhp) at 5,800	235 N⋅m (173 ft⋅lbf) at 5,000	1986–1987
C2 2.7	E30 325i	C2/1	154 kW (209 PS; 207 bhp) at 5,800	267 N⋅m (197 ft⋅lbf) at 4,500	1986–1987
C2 2.7	E30 325i	C2/2	149 kW (203 PS; 200 bhp) at 6,000	265 N⋅m (195 ft⋅lbf) at 4,800	1987-1987
B11 3.5	E32 735i	B11	184 kW (250 PS; 247 bhp) at 5,700	330 N⋅m (243 ft⋅lbf) at 4,000	1987-1987
B11 3.5	E32 735i	B11/1	176 kW (239 PS; 236 bhp) at 5,700	310 N⋅m (229 ft⋅lbf) at 4,500	1987-1987
B11 3.5	E32 735i	B11/3	187 kW (254 PS; 251 bhp) at 6,000	325 N⋅m (240 ft⋅lbf) at 4,000	1987–1993
B3 2.7	E30 325i	C2/2	150 kW (204 PS; 201 bhp) at 6,000	265 N⋅m (195 ft⋅lbf) at 4,800	1987–1992
B6 3.5	E30 325i	B10/5	187 kW (254 PS; 251 bhp) at 5,900	320 N⋅m (236 ft⋅lbf) at 4,000	1987–1990
B6 3.5 S	E30 M3	B10/5	187 kW (254 PS; 251 bhp) at 5,900	320 N⋅m (236 ft⋅lbf) at 4,000	1987–1990
B10 3.5 / 1	E34 535i	B11/3	187 kW (254 PS; 251 bhp) at 6,000	325 N⋅m (240 ft⋅lbf) at 4,000	1988–1992
B12 5.0	E32 750i	D1	257 kW (350 PS; 345 bhp) at 5,300	470 N⋅m (347 ft⋅lbf) at 4,000	1988–1994
B10 Bi-Turbo	E34 535i	B7/5	265 kW (360 PS; 355 bhp) at 6,000	520 N⋅m (384 ft⋅lbf) at 4,000	1989–1994
Roadster Limited Edition	Z1	C2/6	147 kW (200 PS; 197 bhp) at 6,000	261 N⋅m (193 ft⋅lbf) at 4,900	1990–1991
B12 5.0 Coupé	E31 850i/850Ci	D1/1	257 kW (350 PS; 345 bhp) at 5,300	470 N⋅m (347 ft⋅lbf) at 4,000	1990–1994
B6 2.8	E36 325i	E1	177 kW (241 PS; 237 bhp) at 5,900	293 N⋅m (216 ft⋅lbf) at 4,700	1992–1993
B12 5.7 Coupé	E31 850CSi	D2	306 kW (416 PS; 410 bhp) at 5,400	570 N⋅m (420 ft⋅lbf) at 4,000	1992–1996
B3 3.0	E36 325i	E3	184 kW (250 PS; 247 bhp) at 5,700	320 N⋅m (236 ft⋅lbf) at 4,400	1993–1996
B11 4.0	E32 740i	F1	232 kW (315 PS; 311 bhp) at 5,800	410 N⋅m (302 ft⋅lbf) at 4,600	1993–1994
B10 3.0 ALLRAD	E34 525ix	E3/1	170 kW (231 PS; 228 bhp) at 5,800	312 N⋅m (230 ft⋅lbf) at 4,200	1993–1996
B10 4.0	E34 540i	F1	232 kW (315 PS; 311 bhp) at 5,800	410 N⋅m (302 ft⋅lbf) at 4,600	1993–1996
B10 4.6	E34 540i	F2	250 kW (340 PS; 335 bhp) at 5,700	480 N⋅m (354 ft⋅lbf) at 3,900	1994–1996
B8 4.6	E36 328i	F2/1	245 kW (333 PS; 329 bhp) at 5,700	470 N⋅m (347 ft⋅lbf) at 3,900	1995–1998
B12 5.7 E-KAT	E38 750i	D3	285 kW (387 PS; 382 bhp) at 5,200	560 N⋅m (413 ft⋅lbf) at 4,100	1995–1998
B3 3.2	E36 328i	E4	195 kW (265 PS; 261 bhp) at 5,800	330 N⋅m (243 ft⋅lbf) at 4,400	1996–1999
B10 3.2	E39 528i	E4/3	191 kW (260 PS; 256 bhp) at 5,900	330 N⋅m (243 ft⋅lbf) at 4,300	1997–1998
B10 V8	E39 540i	F3	250 kW (340 PS; 335 bhp) at 5,700	470 N⋅m (347 ft⋅lbf) at 3,900	1997–1998
B10 V8	E39 540i	F4	255 kW (347 PS; 342 bhp) at 5,700	480 N⋅m (354 ft⋅lbf) at 3,700	1998–2002
B3 3.3	E46 328i	E4/4	206 kW (280 PS; 276 bhp) at 6,200	335 N⋅m (247 ft⋅lbf) at 4,500	1999–2002
B10 3.3	E39 528i	E4/5	206 kW (280 PS; 276 bhp) at 6,200	335 N⋅m (247 ft⋅lbf) at 4,500	1999–2003
B12 6.0 E-KAT	E38 750i	D3/2	316 kW (430 PS; 424 bhp) at 5,400	600 N⋅m (443 ft⋅lbf) at 4,200	1999–2001
B3 3.3 ALLRAD	E46 330ix	E4/8	206 kW (280 PS; 276 bhp) at 6,200	335 N⋅m (247 ft⋅lbf) at 4,500	2001–2005
Roadster V8	E52 Z8	F5	280 kW (381 PS; 375 bhp) at 5,800	520 N⋅m (384 ft⋅lbf) at 3,800	2002–2003
B3 S	E46 330i	E5/1	224 kW (305 PS; 300 bhp) at 6,300	362 N⋅m (267 ft⋅lbf) at 4,800	2002–2006
B10 V8 S	E39 540i	F5	276 kW (375 PS; 370 bhp) at 5,800	510 N⋅m (376 ft⋅lbf) at 3,800	2002–2004
Roadster S	E85 Z4	E5/2	221 kW (300 PS; 296 bhp) at 6,300	362 N⋅m (267 ft⋅lbf) at 4,800	2003–2005
B7	E65/E66 745i	H1	368 kW (500 PS; 493 bhp) at 5,500	700 N⋅m (516 ft⋅lbf) at 4,250	2003–2008
B5	E60/E61 545i	H1	368 kW (500 PS; 493 bhp) at 5,500	700 N⋅m (516 ft⋅lbf) at 4,250	2005–2007
B6	E63/E64 650i	H1	368 kW (500 PS; 493 bhp) at 5,500	700 N⋅m (516 ft⋅lbf) at 4,250	2006–2008
B5S	E60/E61 550i	H2	390 kW (530 PS; 523 bhp) at 5,500	725 N⋅m (535 ft⋅lbf) at 4,750	2007–2010
B3 Bi-Turbo	E90/E91/E92/E93 335i	K2	265 kW (360 PS; 355 bhp) at 5,500	500 N⋅m (369 ft⋅lbf) at 3,800	2007–2010
B3 Bi-Turbo Allrad	E90/E91/E92 335xi	K2	265 kW (360 PS; 355 bhp) at 5,500	500 N⋅m (369 ft⋅lbf) at 3,800	2008–2010
B6	F06/F12/F13 6 Series	M2/1	540 PS (397 kW; 533 hp) 507 PS (373 kW; 500 hp) (convertible) 600 PS (441 kW; 592 hp) (2015-2019)	700 N⋅m (516 lb⋅ft) 800 N⋅m (590 lb⋅ft) (2015-2019)	2011-2019
B5	F10/F11 5 Series		507 PS (373 kW; 500 hp) at 5,500 540 PS (397 kW; 533 hp) at 5,200-6,250 (2012 facelift)	700 N⋅m (516 lb⋅ft) 733 N⋅m (541 lb⋅ft) at 2,800 (2012 facelift)	2011-2016
B4	F32/F33 4 Series		408 PS (300 kW; 402 hp) at 5,500-6,250	601 N⋅m (443 lb⋅ft) at 3,000-4,000	2014-2022
B4 S	F32/F33 4 Series		440 PS (324 kW; 434 hp) at 5,500-6,250	660 N⋅m (487 lb⋅ft) at 3,000	2017-2022
B5	G30/G31 5 Series	M5	608 PS (599 hp; 447 kW)	800 N⋅m (590 lb⋅ft)	2017-2024
B4 S Edition 99	F32 4 Series		452 PS (332 kW; 446 hp) at 5,500-6,250	680 N⋅m (502 lb⋅ft) at 3,000-4,500	2018-2018
XB7	G07 X7		621 PS (457 kW; 613 hp)	800 N⋅m (590 lb⋅ft)	2020-2026
B8 Gran Coupé	G16 8 Series		630 PS (463 kW; 621 hp)	800 N⋅m (590 lb⋅ft)	2021-2025
B4 Gran Coupé	G26 4 Series		495 PS (488 hp; 364 kW) at 5,500-7,000	730 N⋅m (538 lb⋅ft) at 2,500-4,500	2022-2025
B4 GT Gran Coupé	G26 4 Series		529 PS (522 hp; 389 kW) at 6,250-6,500	730 N⋅m (538 lb⋅ft) at 2,500-4,500	2022-2025

=== Diesel-engine ===
Alpina Previous Models (Diesel engines)
Alpina model	BMW donor model	Alpina Engine	Power at rpm	Torque at rpm	Production
D10 BITURBO	E39 530d	G1	180 kW (245 PS; 241 bhp) at 4,200	500 N⋅m (369 ft⋅lbf) at 3,500	2000–2003
D3	E90/E91 320d	M47	147 kW (200 PS; 197 bhp) at 4,000	410 N⋅m (302 ft⋅lbf) at 2,000	2005–2008
D3 Bi-Turbo	E90/E91/E92 3 Series (engine from BMW 123d)	N1	157 kW (213 PS; 211 bhp)	450 N⋅m (332 ft⋅lbf) at 2,000-2,500	2008-2013
XD3 Bi-Turbo	F25 X3		350 PS (257 kW; 345 hp)	700 N⋅m (516 lb⋅ft)	2013-2018
D3	F30/F31 3 Series		350 PS (257 kW; 345 hp) at 4,000	700 N⋅m (516 lb⋅ft)	2013-2019
D4	F32/F33 4 Series		350 PS (257 kW; 345 hp) at 4,000	700 N⋅m (516 lb⋅ft) at 1,500-3,000	2014-2025
D5 S (tri-turbo)	G30 5 Series		282 kW (383 PS; 378 hp)	800 N⋅m (590 lb⋅ft)	2017-2024
D5 S (bi-turbo)	G30 5 Series		240 kW (326 PS; 322 hp)	700 N⋅m (516 lb⋅ft)	2017-2024
XD3 (quad-turbo)	G01 X3		388 PS (285 kW; 383 hp)	770 N⋅m (568 lb⋅ft)	2018-2025
XD3 (bi-turbo)	G01 X3		333 PS (245 kW; 328 hp)	700 N⋅m (516 lb⋅ft)	2018-2025
XD4	G02 X4		388 PS (285 kW; 383 hp)	770 N⋅m (568 lb⋅ft)	2018-2025

== 3 Series based Alpinas ==
=== C1 ===
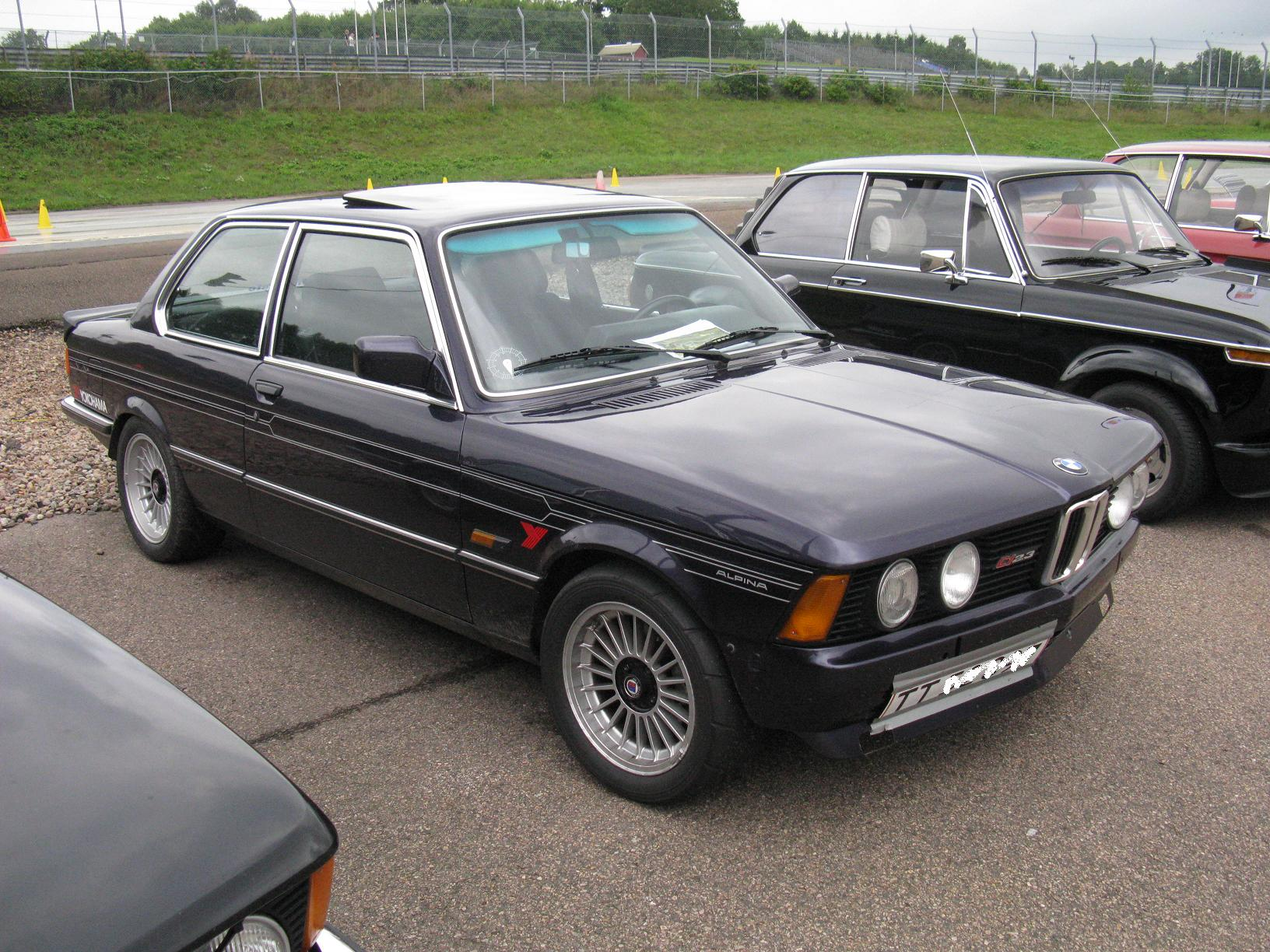
Alpina C1

The Alpina C1 was based on the E21 323i and was among their most popular early models, providing superior performance over the unmodified car. The C1 2.3 made 125 kW (168 hp) and 225 N⋅m (166 lb⋅ft) of torque. 0–100 km/h (0–62 mph) is achieved in 7.8 seconds. Top speed was 213 km/h (132 mph). The extra power is due to special Mahle pistons, and a special exhaust and ignition system. It also received dry-sump lubrication and a short-ratio five-speed gearbox. Only 35 C1 cars were built, making it one of the rarest Alpina models. As BMW released the 325i, Alpina responded with the C2 2.5, and later the 2.7 models, providing between 190–210 hp (142–157 kW). The brakes and suspension were also upgraded.

The C1 2.5 and early C2 / 2.6* models used the M20B23 (2.3L) engine, but bore and stroke were increased to achieve a displacement of 2552 cm3. Alpina reworked the head which was ported and polished, installed harder valve springs and a hotter cam. The intake manifold was also reworked, and Alpina used a larger throttle body. It produced 136 kW (182 hp), with 246 N⋅m (181 lb⋅ft) of torque. Alpina claimed 0–100 km/h (62 mph) acceleration in 7.1 seconds. Top speed was 220 km/h (137 mph). Production is unclear, with estimates ranging from 35 cars built to around 400 depending on the source.

=== C2 ===
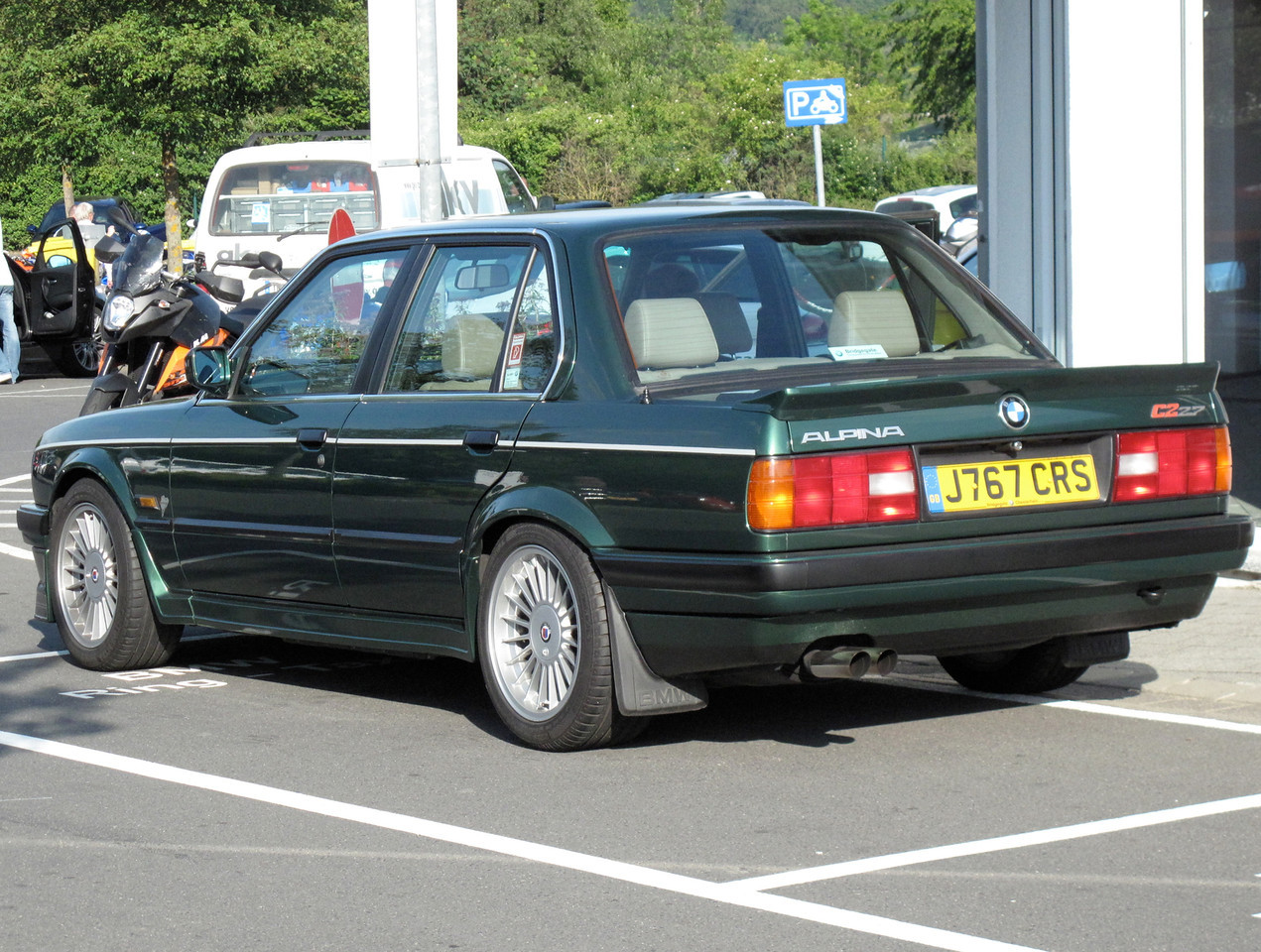
Alpina C2 2.7 Allrad, based on the all-wheel drive BMW 325ix

An interesting variant of the M20 engine was Alpina's C2. The first C2 combined the wider bore of the M20B25 with the slightly larger 76.8 mm (3.02 in) crankshaft of an M20B23, to create a torquier engine of 2552 cc. This version put out 185 PS (136 kW; 182 hp) and 265 N⋅m (195 lb⋅ft), 74 units were built between 1985 and November 1986. After the C2 2.7 appeared in the spring of 1986, the 2.5 was slightly upgraded and gained 5 horsepower. However, to indicate its "little brother" position in the lineup, the name was changed to C1 2.5. When the September 1987 facelift model of the E30 was introduced, the 2.5 litre C1 was discontinued, although a few cars were finished into 1988.

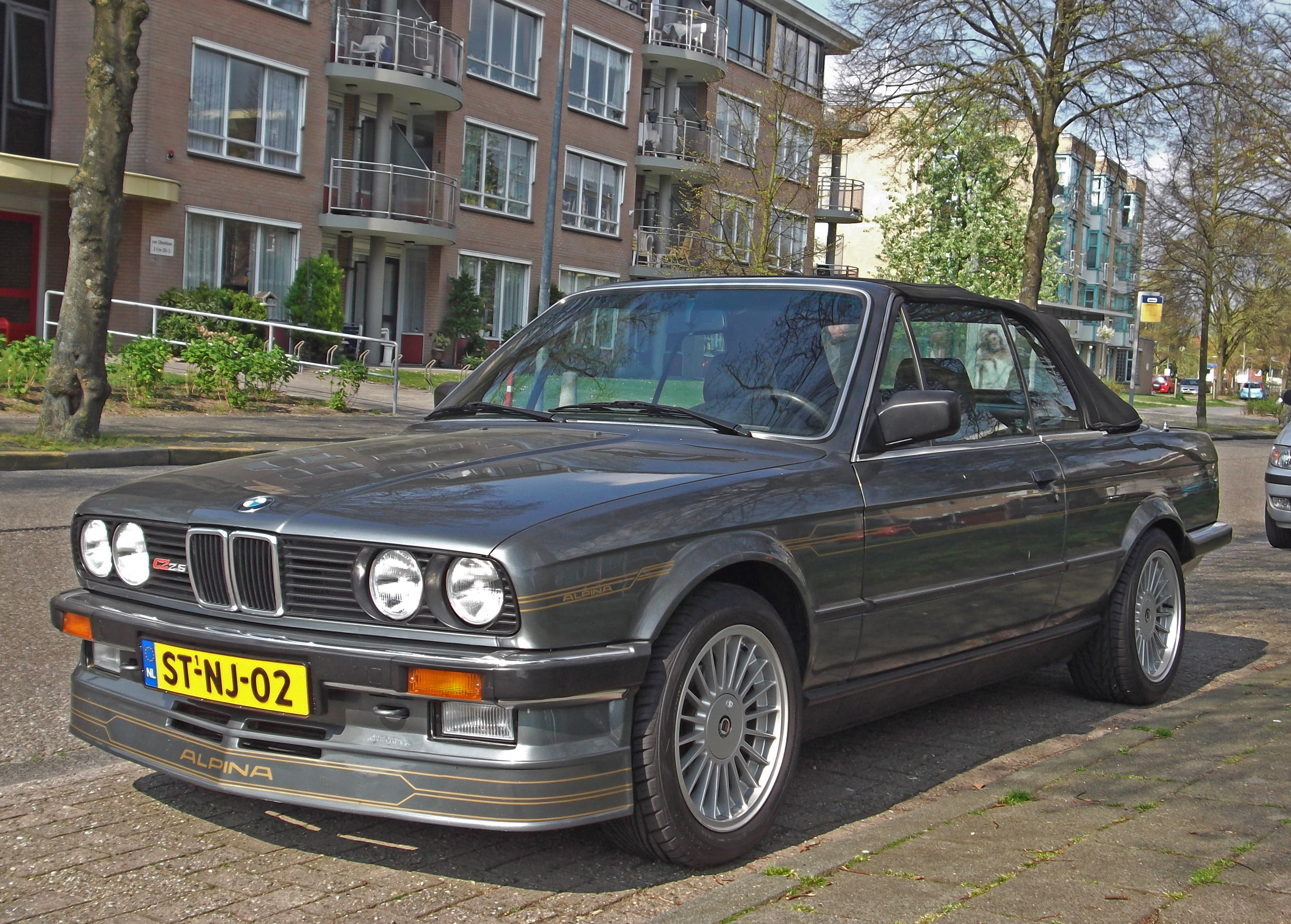
Alpina C2 2.7 Cabriolet

The larger yet 2.7 litre unit was introduced in February 1986 in uncatalyzed C2/1 form. This engine, sharing the dimensions of the M20B27, develops 210 PS (154 kW; 207 hp) at 5800 rpm and shows what the engine was really capable of. Originally installed in the E30-based Alpina C2 2.7, with available four-wheel drive, the catalyzed C2/2 appeared in the interim C2 2.7 Kat in March 1987. This was then renamed "B3 2.7" five months later, by which time the "C2" labelled cars were discontinued. The B3 2.7 continued to be available until June 1992, in all body variants and drivetrain configurations (excepting automatics) in which the E30 was offered. Around 1986, 67 "B6 2.7"-labelled C2-engined E30s were built for export to Japan, where the larger 3.0 L B6 3.5 had a hard time passing emissions regulations. Aside from the C2 drivetrain, the B6 2.7 is cosmetically identical to the B6 3.5.

Later C2 2.5 models (C2 /3 2.5) were based on the 325i. Alpina used the M20B25 engine with very few modifications compared to earlier models. Again the cylinder head was decked to increase compression ratio, and it was ported and polished. The ECU was also remapped. Max power is 140 kW (188 hp), with 235 N⋅m (173 lb⋅ft) of torque. 0–100 km/h (62 mph) was achieved in 7.2 seconds. Top speed is 220 km/h (137 mph). Only 50 cars were built.

The C2 /1 2.7 used the 325e eta model engine block, crank and rods, but with custom flat head pistons provided by Mahle. Originally Alpina modified the "200" casting number cylinder head specific to the 325e with bigger intake valves, larger air intake ports, and redesigned the valve chamber for better flow. A more aggressive camshaft was used, with higher lift and duration, and harder valve springs were installed. Compression ratio was increased to 10.2:1. The C2/1 2.7 made 210 bhp (157 kW) with 267 N⋅m (197 lb⋅ft) of torque and was the fastest E30 available at the time (227 km/h (141 mph) top speed). 108 cars were built.

Later C2 /2 2.7 (and early 1987 B3 2.7) used the M20B25 block with ETA (325e) crank and rods. The intake manifold was also redesigned for better flow. The head was decked to improve compression ratio (10.1:1 for models with the 731 head, 9.6:1 for later "885" head models with catalytic converter) and matched with custom pistons - flat Mahle pistons for engines equipped with the 731 head, and domed KS pistons for engines equipped with the 885 head. Larger throttle bodies were installed (the C2/2 version uses the same throttle body as the M20B25 325i). A total of 309 cars were built between 1986 and 1987. The C2/2 2.7 makes 204 bhp (152 kW) and 266 N⋅m (196 lb⋅ft) of torque. Top speed is 224 km/h (139 mph) and 0–100 km/h (62 mph) is achieved in 7.5 seconds.

The B3 2.7 is similar to late C2/2 2.7 cars. It uses the M20B25 block with M20B27 crank and custom rods. The 885 head is exclusively used for the B3 model. The head is decked ~ 1 mm to improve CR to 9.6:1 and matched with custom domed KS or Mahle pistons. Intake and cylinder head are ported and polished. Custom ECU mapping is used. Engine management is Bosch Motronic 1.3. The B3 2.7 is equipped with a catalytic converter to conform to emission standard of the time. Performance numbers are similar to the later C2/2 2.7 cars. 254 cars were built from 1987 to 1992.

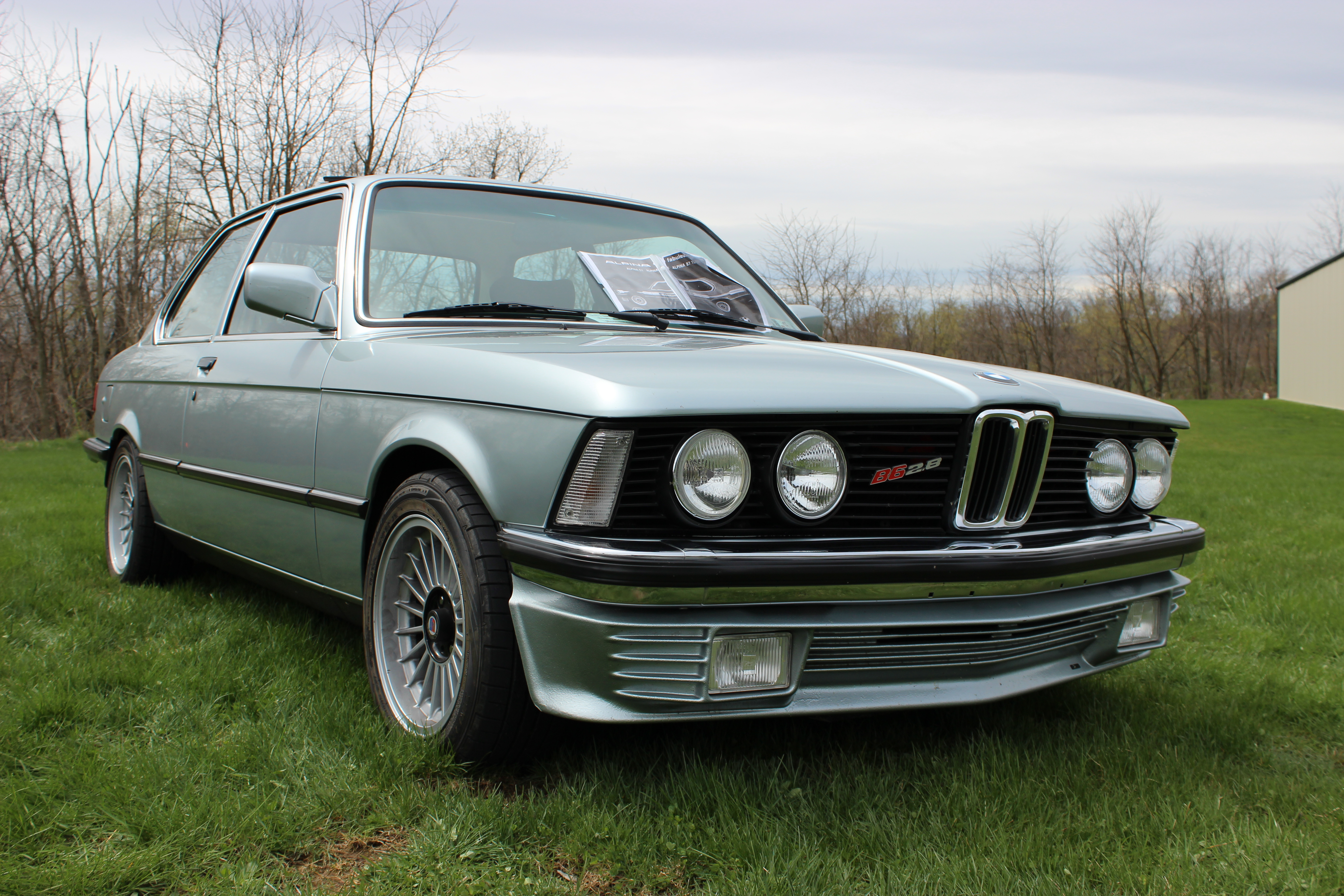
Alpina B6 2.8

=== B6 ===
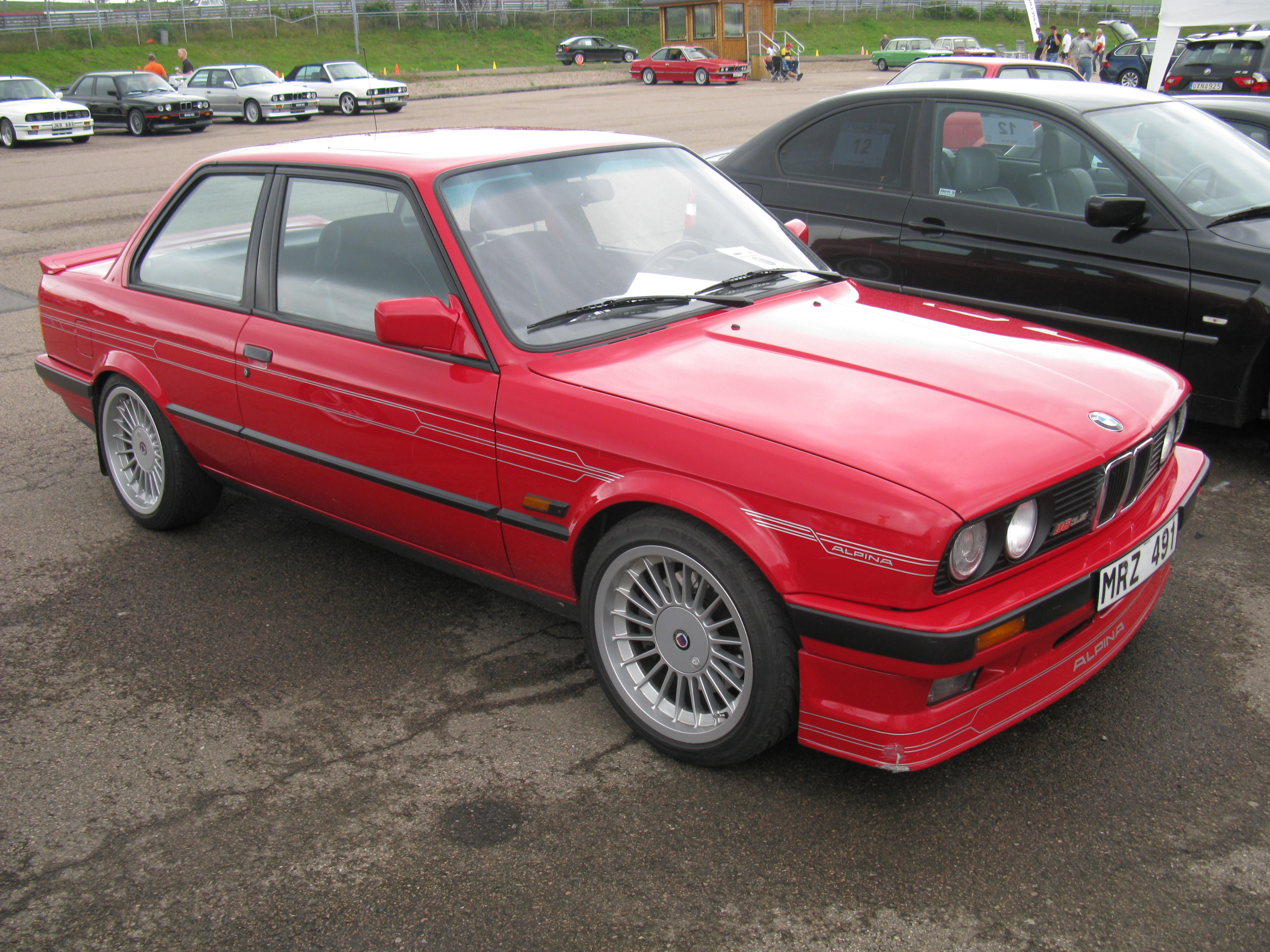
Alpina B6 3.5

The Alpina B6 2.8 is based on the 323i, but uses the same B6/2 engine used in the B6 E21. The car makes 210 bhp (157 kW) and 270 N⋅m (199 lb⋅ft) of torque. Top speed is 230 km/h (143 mph). 0–100 km/h (62 mph) is achieved in 7.2 seconds. 533 cars were made from 1983 to 1986.

The Alpina B6 3.5 is based on the 325i chassis, but uses the M30 "big six" 3430 cm3 engine, upgraded to 261 bhp (195 kW) and 346 N⋅m (255 lb⋅ft) of torque. 0–100 km/h (62 mph) is achieved in 6.4 seconds. The engine uses custom Mahle pistons and rods. The cylinder head was ported and polished, and a hotter cam was used. Top speed is 250 km/h (155 mph). Suspension and brakes were upgraded. Bigger ventilated disks and progressive springs were installed at the front. Only 210 cars were made from 1986 to 1990. The B6 3.5 was sold in Japan as the B6 2.7 and used the 2.7 L engine from the Alpina C2 as the larger 3.0 L engine was unable to pass emissions.

The Alpina B6 3.5 S uses the M3 chassis. The 3.5 S, like the 3.5, uses the B10/2 M30 "big six" which makes 261 bhp (195 kW) and 346 N⋅m (255 lb⋅ft) of torque. Displacement is 3430 cm3. 0–100 km/h (62 mph) is achieved in 6.4 seconds. Top speed is 250 km/h (155 mph). The gearbox used is the Getrag 260/6 sport, known as a dog-leg gearbox. Only 62 cars were made from 1987 to 1990.

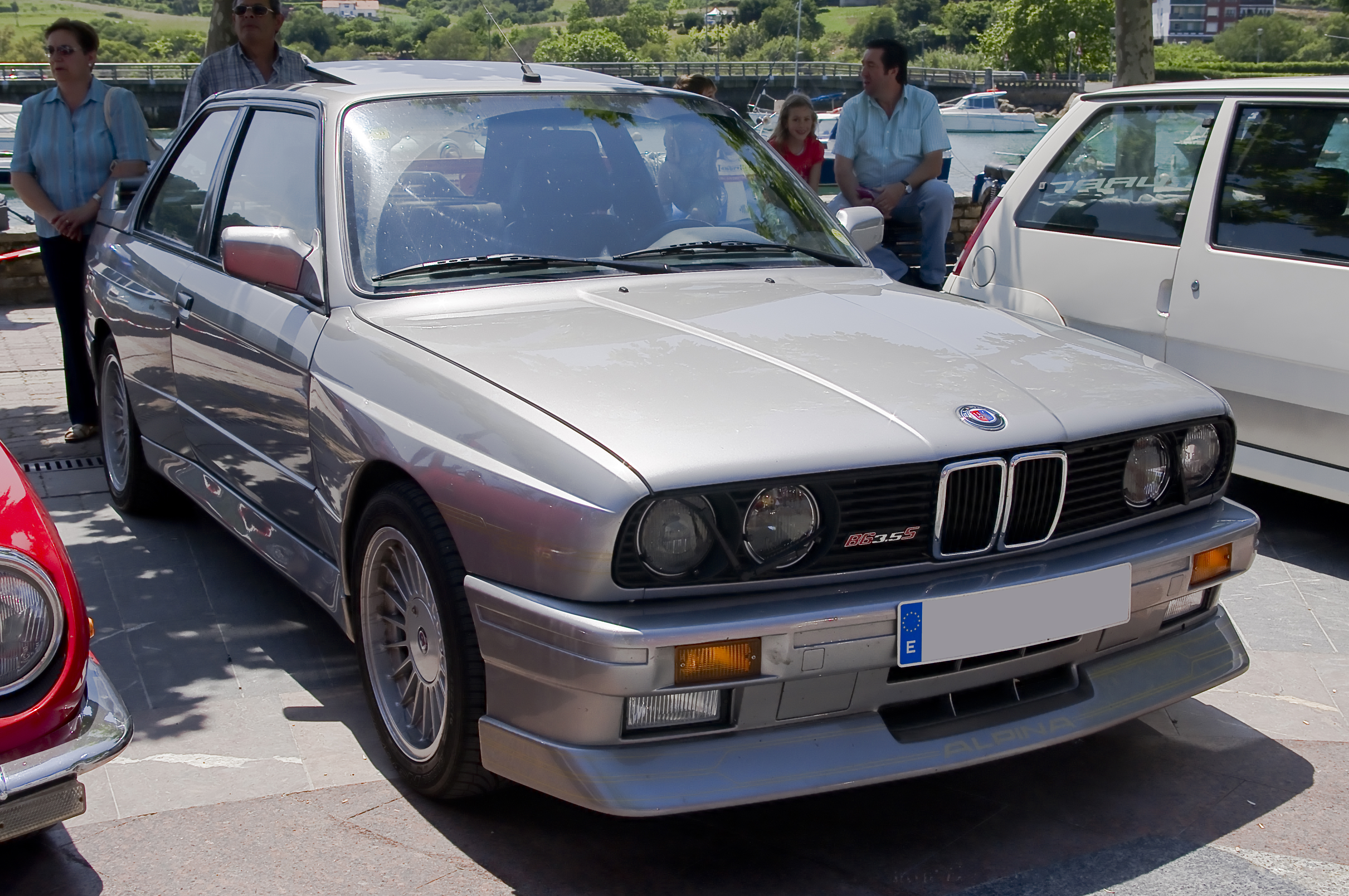
Alpina B6 3.5 S, based on the E30 M3

The E30 BMW 333i was developed by Alpina for BMW South Africa. It was based on the 325i chassis and M30B32 engine, with numerous Alpina components common to the B6. Customers had to choose between power steering or air conditioning because of limited space in the engine bay.

=== B3 ===
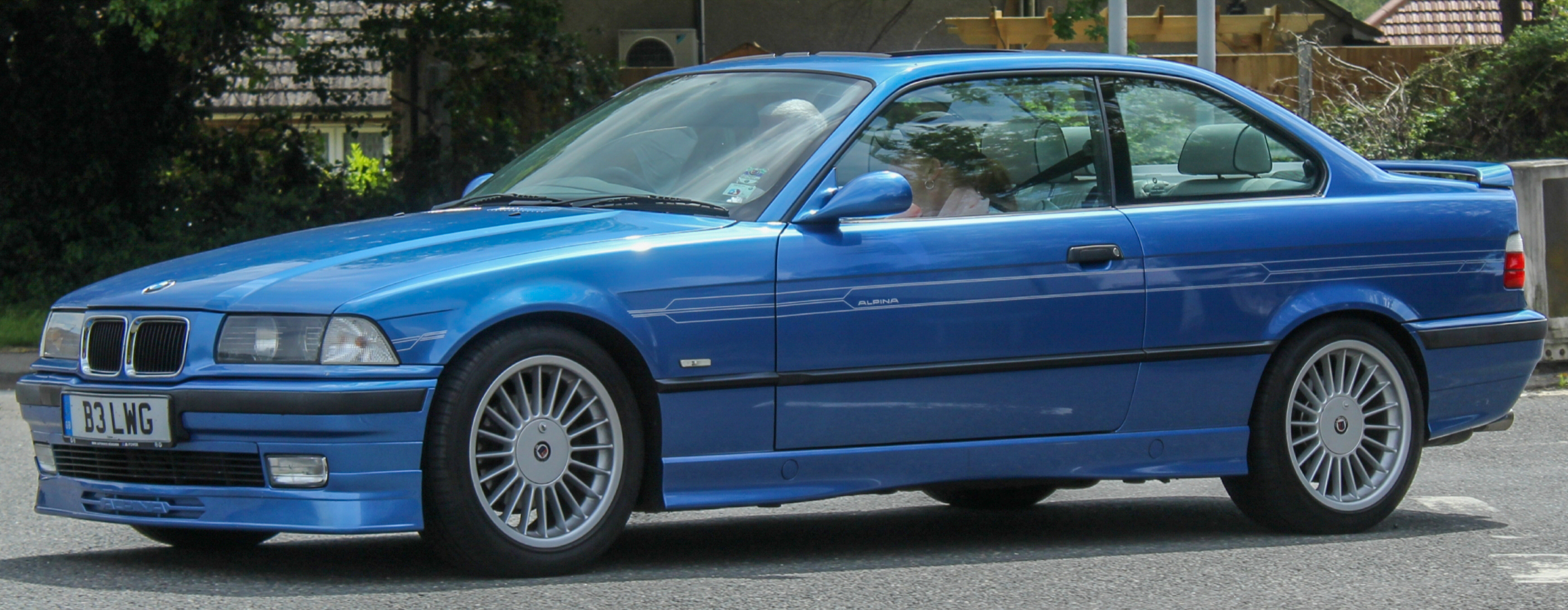
Alpina B3 3.2 (E36)

Between 1993 and 1996, the BMW Alpina B3 3.0 of the E36 series was produced. It was the direct successor model of the Alpina B6-2.8 model of the E36 series, which was also based on the BMW 325i (but M50B25 without Vanos model until August 1992 - then with VANOS). In the spring of 1996, the B3 3.2 followed as an upgrade. The body base for the B3 3.0 was a 325i (BMW E36) and a 328i for the B3 3.2. In both models, however, Alpina used the more robust M50 (B25TÜ) cast iron engine, as the M52 engine of the 328i was not suitable for expanding the displacement. Both vehicle variants were available as a coupé (two-door) and sedan (four-door), cabriolet (convertible) and station wagon (touring).

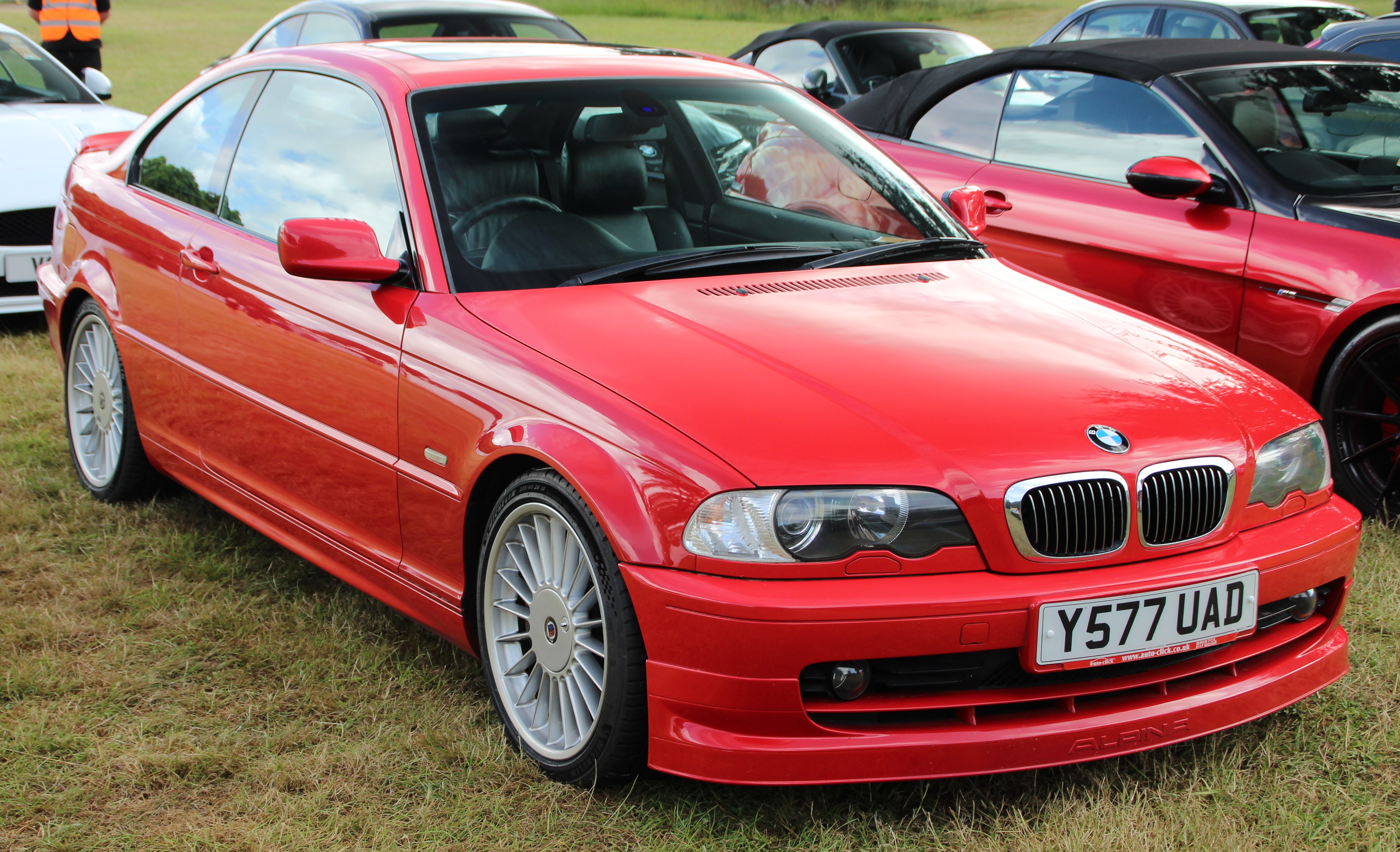
2000 Alpina B3 (E46)

In 1999, the new BMW Alpina B3 3.3 of the E46 series was introduced. The body base was initially provided by the 328i (M52TÜ) and then later by the 330i (M54). The following model variants were available: sedan, coupé, cabriolet (convertible) and station wagon (touring). From 2001, the B3 was also offered in an all-wheel drive variant. From 2002, the Alpina B3 S with 224 kW maximum power and 362 Nm maximum torque was produced. For both E46-B3 models, Alpina used the E36-US-M3 gray cast iron engine block (S52B32/US) as the basis and modified it, since neither the M52TÜ nor the M54 engine block were suitable for it.

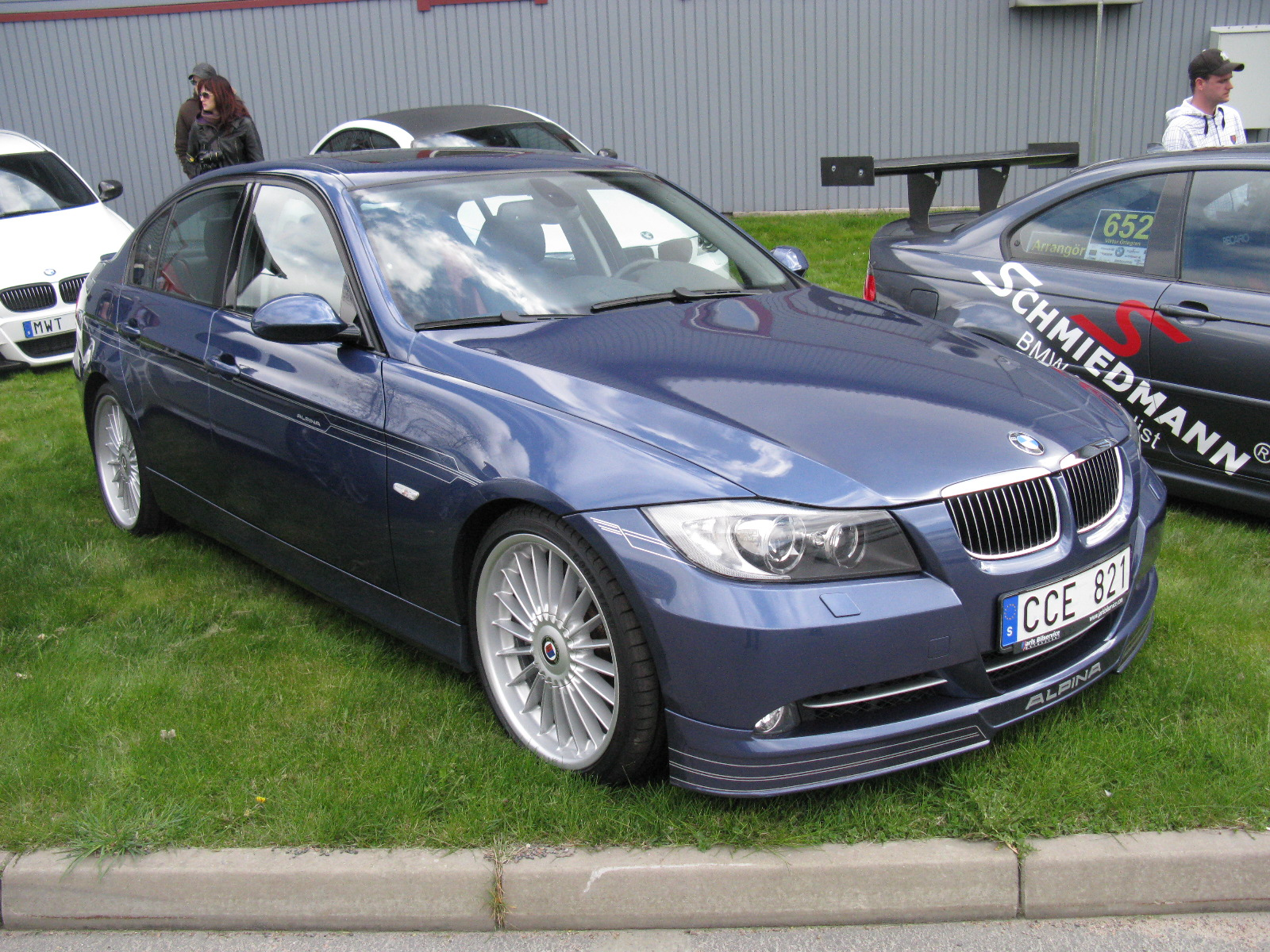
Alpina B3 (E90)

The second Alpina B3 Biturbo was produced from 2007 to 2012. It is based on the BMW E9x 335i and was available as a sedan (E90), station wagon (Touring, E91), cabriolet (convertible, E93) and coupé (E92), from 2008 also optionally with all-wheel drive (except convertible). The station wagon was only available with the facelift in October 2008. It is powered by a twin-turbocharged 3.0 L six-cylinder engine which produces a maximum output of 265 kW (355 hp) and 500 N⋅m (369 lb⋅ft). This allows it to accelerate from 0 to 100 km/h (62 mph) in 4.8 seconds, and on to a claimed top speed of 285 km/h (177 mph). For the 2010 model year, the B3S Biturbo was presented, with maximum power increased by 29 kW (39 hp) to 294 kW (394 hp) and torque increased to 540 N⋅m (398 lb⋅ft), allowing for acceleration from 0 to 100 km/h (62 mph) in 4.7 seconds. The maximum speed is 300 km/h (186 mph) according to the factory. Production of the E90 and E91 (saloon and estate) ended in 2011, while E92/E93 (coupé/convertible) production continued until 2013.

=== B3 GT3 ===
To celebrate Alpina's victory in the 2011 ADAC GT Masters with an Alpina B6 GT3, Alpina decided to produce a limited run of the Alpina B3 S Bi-Turbo, called the Alpina B3 GT3. The B3 GT3 features a new exhaust system developed in collaboration with Akrapovič which is 11 kg (24 lb) lighter than the standard exhaust and increases power to 300 kW (408 PS; 402 bhp) and 398 lb⋅ft (540 N⋅m) of torque. It features upgraded brakes with 380 mm discs, a Drexler limited slip differential and fully adjustable coilovers by KW at all four corners. The most noticeable changes were on the exterior: The B3 GT3 sports a carbon fibre rear wing, a special front splitter and 19" lightweight Alpina GT3 Classic wheels, painted in Himalaya Grey. The B3 GT3 was available in Black Sapphire metallic, Mineral White metallic, Alpina Blue metallic or with a full body vinyl wrap in the official GT3 design. The car could be ordered with an extra set of lightweight wheels (also 19" Alpina GT3 Classic, but equipped with Michelin Pilot Sport Cup+ tires) for use on the track.

Only 99 units were produced.

=== B3 Bi-Turbo ===
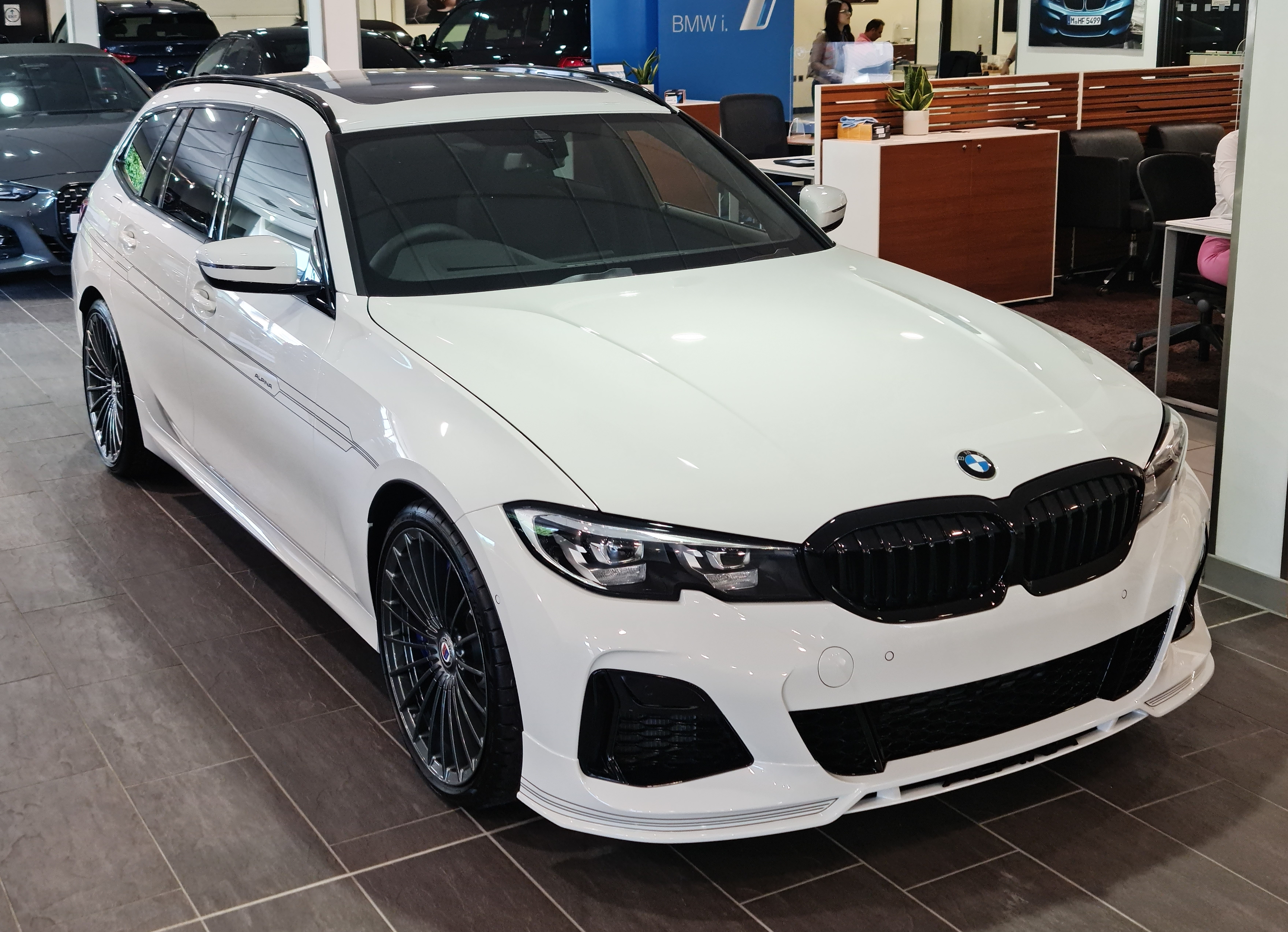
Alpina B3 S Touring (G21)

The F30 Alpina B3 Bi-Turbo was in production since March 2013. It is based on the BMW F30 335i with a bi-turbocharged 3.0 litre six cylinder. The 301 kW (409 PS; 404 hp) engine with 600 N⋅m (443 lb⋅ft) of torque accelerates the B3 from 0–100 km/h (62 mph) in 4.0 seconds. The top speed is 305 km/h (190 mph). The B3 Biturbo is available as a sedan or touring, both can be combined with xDrive four-wheel drive. In March 2017, Alpina revised the engine of the B3 to produce 324 kW (441 PS; 434 hp).

A new model based on the G20 3 Series replaced the F30 model, it uses the S58 3.0 litre bi-turbo inline six engine producing 340 kW (462 PS; 456 hp) and 700 N⋅m (516 lb⋅ft) of torque, which is 150 N⋅m (111 lb⋅ft) more than the BMW M3, and 50 N⋅m (37 lb⋅ft) more than the BMW M3 Competition.

=== D3 Bi-Turbo ===
The Alpina D3 Bi-Turbo was presented at IAA 2013. It is based on the BMW F30. It is available as a Saloon or Touring version with a 3.0-litre straight-six, bi-turbocharged diesel engine with 257 kW (349 PS; 345 hp) of Power and 700 N⋅m (516 lb⋅ft) of torque. The Touring is also available with all-wheel drive, based on BMW xDrive.

== 4 Series based Alpinas ==
=== B4 Bi-Turbo ===
Launched in 2014, the B4 is based on the 435i. The N55 straight-six engine is modified by using twin-turbochargers, a sixty-one percent larger intercooler and a new crankshaft. The engine also utilises new pistons, all of these modifications allow the engine to generate 408 PS (300 kW; 402 hp) between 5,550 and 6,250 rpm and 601 N⋅m (443 lb⋅ft) between 3,000 and 4,000 rpm.

== 5 Series based Alpinas ==
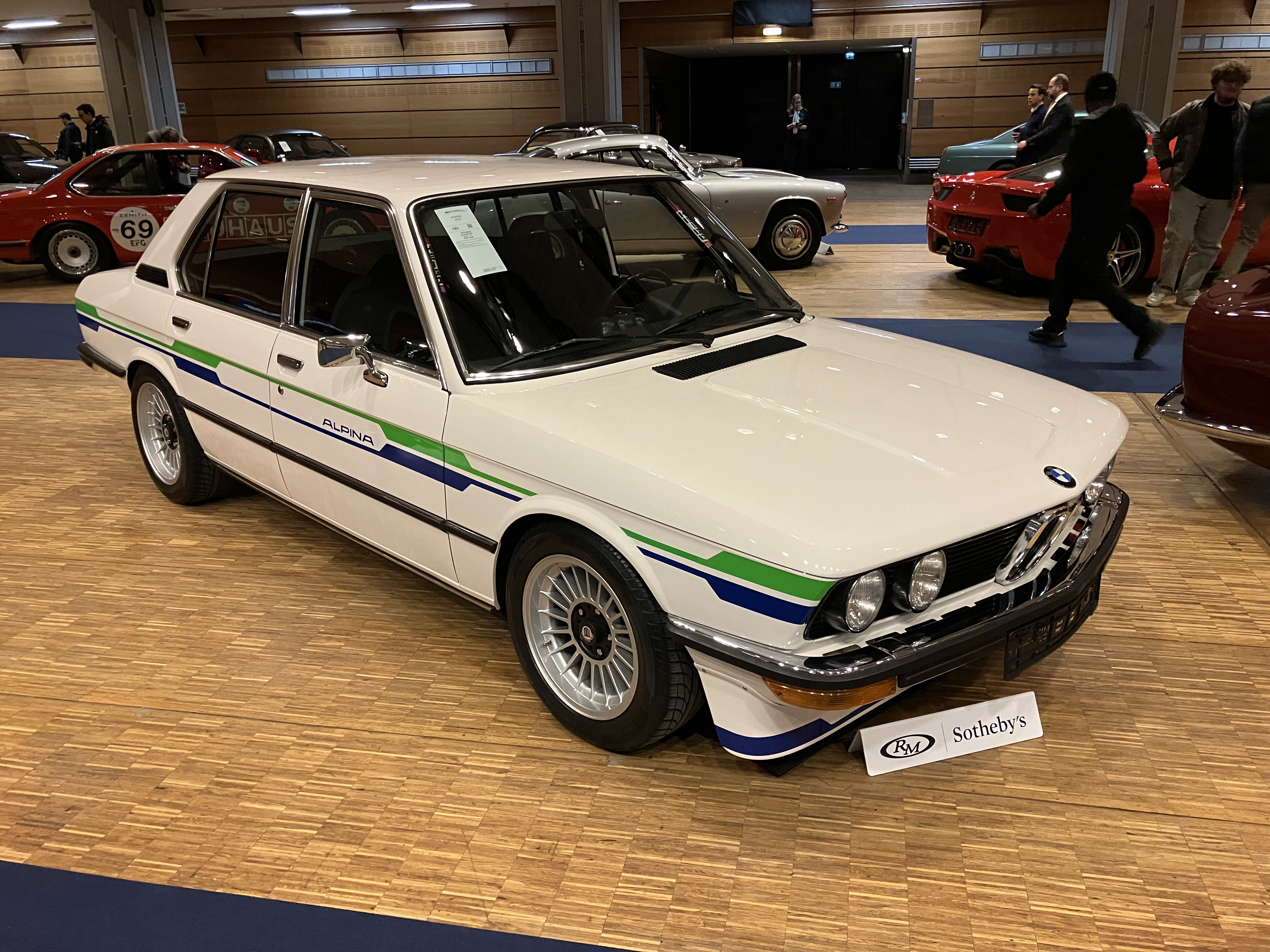
1976 B2

=== E12 B2 ===
The Alpina B2 is based on the 1976 BMW 5 Series (E12) 528i. The car featured a bored-out 230 hp (233 PS; 172 kW) 3.0-liter straight-six fitted with three double barrel carburetors. Only eleven B2 were built before the introduction of the B7.

=== E12 B7 Turbo / B7 S Turbo ===
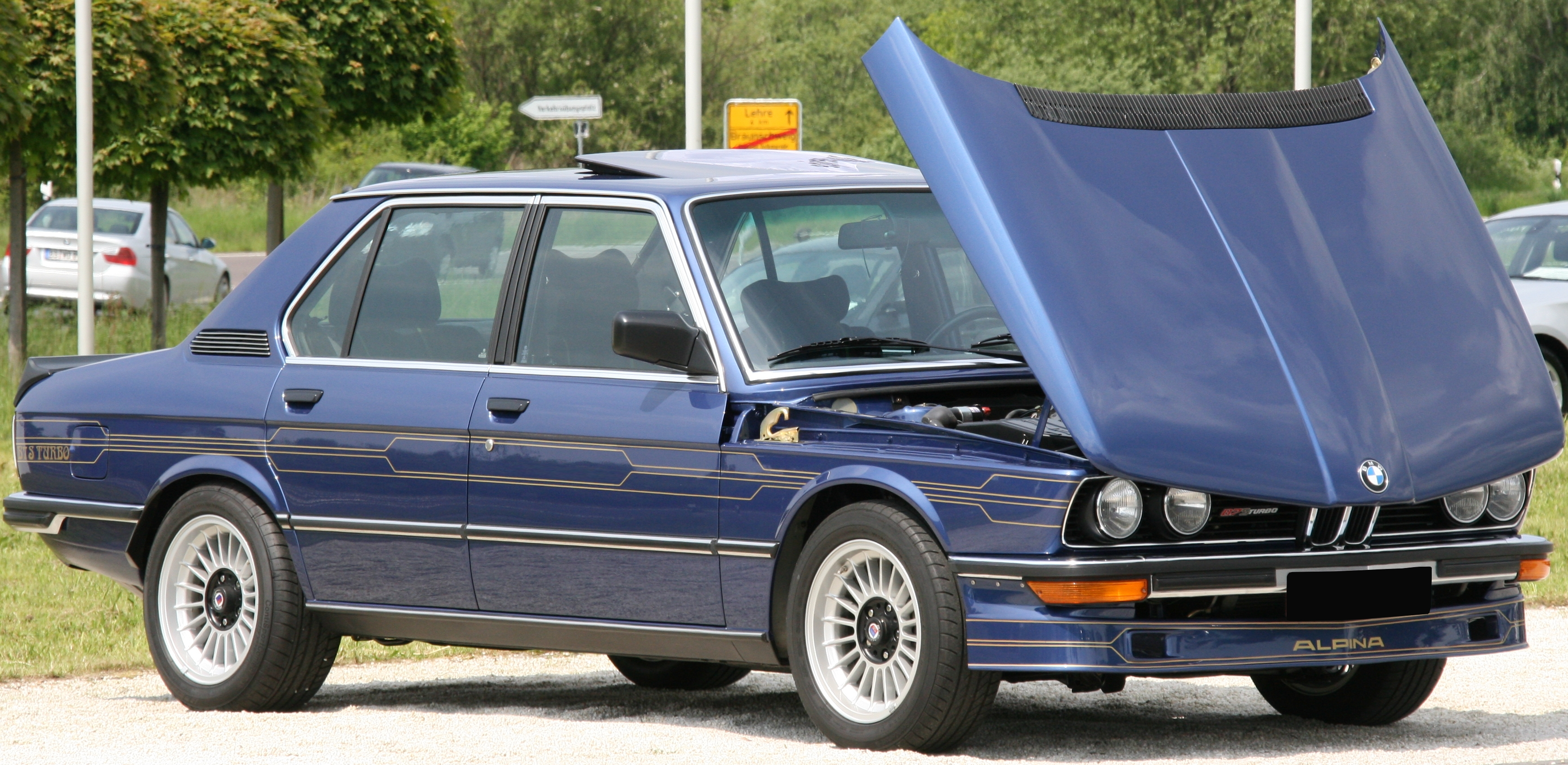
E12 B7 S Turbo

The Alpina B7 Turbo is based on the BMW 5 Series (E12) 528i like its predecessor the B2. From 1978 to 1982 it featured a B7 engine with 221 kW (300 PS; 296 bhp) at 6,000 rpm and 462 N⋅m (341 ft⋅lbf) at 3,000 rpm. In 1981, Alpina introduced the B7 S Turbo with 243 kW (330 PS; 326 bhp) at 5,800 rpm and 500 N⋅m (369 ft⋅lbf) at 3,000 rpm. Only sixty B7 S Turbos were produced.

=== E28 B9 ===
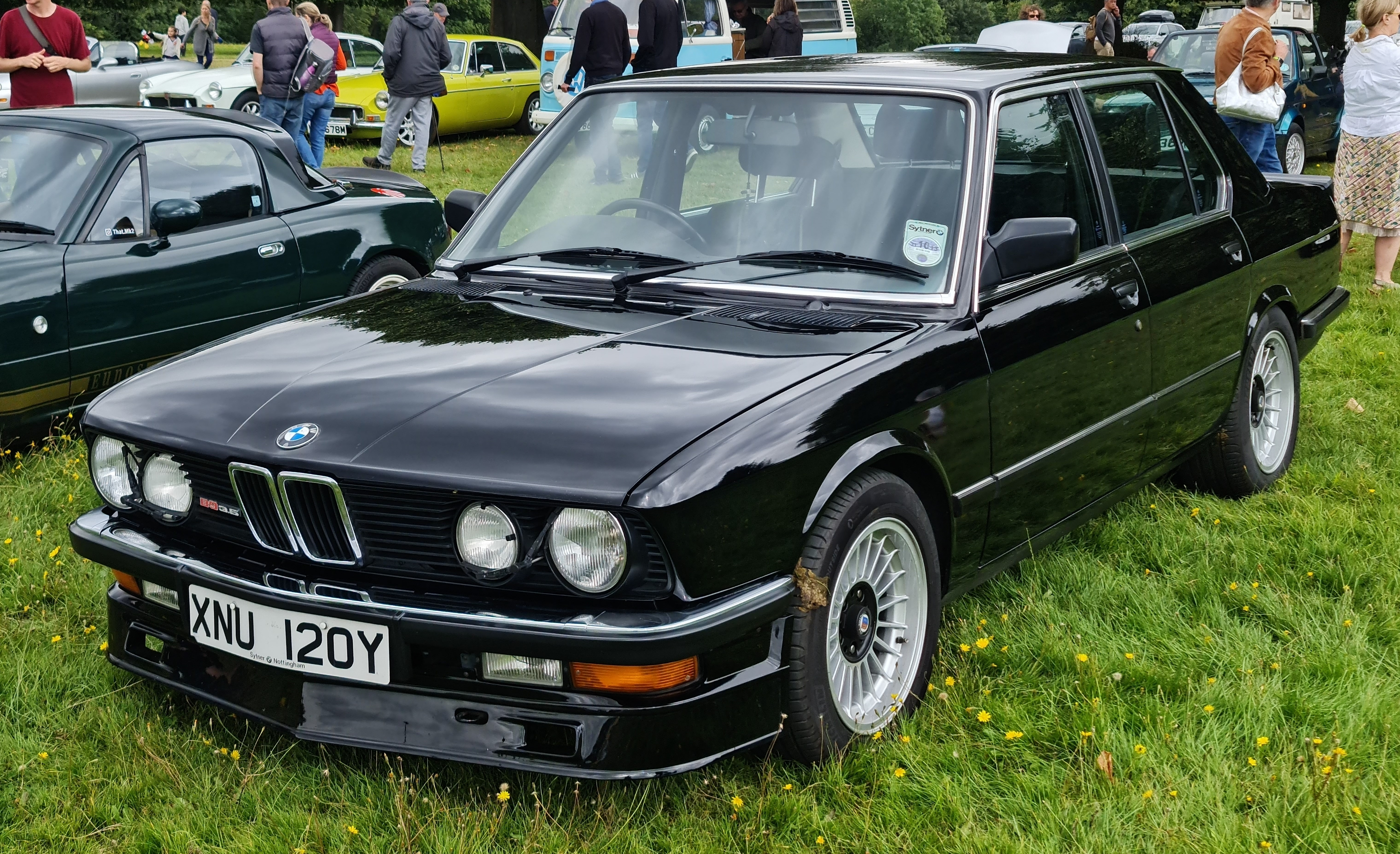
Alpina B9, based on the BMW E28

The Alpina B9 was built in a small series from November 1981 to December 1985 on the basis of the BMW E28. About 500 examples were produced.

==== Changes ====
The B9 is based on the 528i, whose M30-2.8-litre BMW engine was replaced by a 3.45-litre. Alpina tuned engine. The motor is based on the 3.5-liter version of the M30, but has been extensively modified. Alpina replaced the cylinder head, pistons, camshaft and modified the Bosch Motronic ECU. The engine transmits its power to the rear wheels via a 5-speed gearbox, an automatic transmission was also available. The suspension of the E28 has been modified with Bilstein gas dampers, as standard the B9 was delivered with 16-inch wheels (see picture). Alpina also modified the interior with among other things, Recaro seats, a new shifter and a modified instrument cluster.

==== Technical specifications ====
	B9 3.5	B9 3.5 / 1
Production period	11/1981 – 08/1983	01/1983 – 12/1985
Motor type	B9	
Design	Inline-six	
Displacement	3453 cm^{3}	3430 cm^{3}
Power	180 kW (245 PS; 241 hp) at 5,700 rpm	
Torque	320 N⋅m (236 ft⋅lbf) at 4,500 rpm	
Acceleration 0–100 km/h (62 mph)	6.7 s	
Top speed	240 km/h (149 mph)	
Source		

=== E28 B10 ===
In 1985, Alpina launched the B10 3.5, based on the BMW 535i (E28).

The 3.5 liter six-cylinder engine from the B6 3.5 was fitted to replace the B9's 3.45 liter. The output was 192 kW (261 PS; 257 hp). Only 77 examples of the B10 3.5 were produced.

==== Technical specifications ====
Model	B10 3,5
Platform	BMW 535i E28
Production period	7/1985–12/1987
Displacement	3430 cm^{3}
Engine architecture	Inline-six
Power	192 kW (261 PS; 257 hp) at 5,700 rpm
Torque	346 N⋅m (255 lb⋅ft) at 4,000 rpm
Transmission	5-speed manual transmission, or a 4-speed automatic transmission (optional)
Acceleration, 0–100 km/h (62 mph)	6.4 s
Top speed	250 km/h (155 mph) (automatic: 245 km/h (152 mph))
Production	77

=== E34 B10 ===
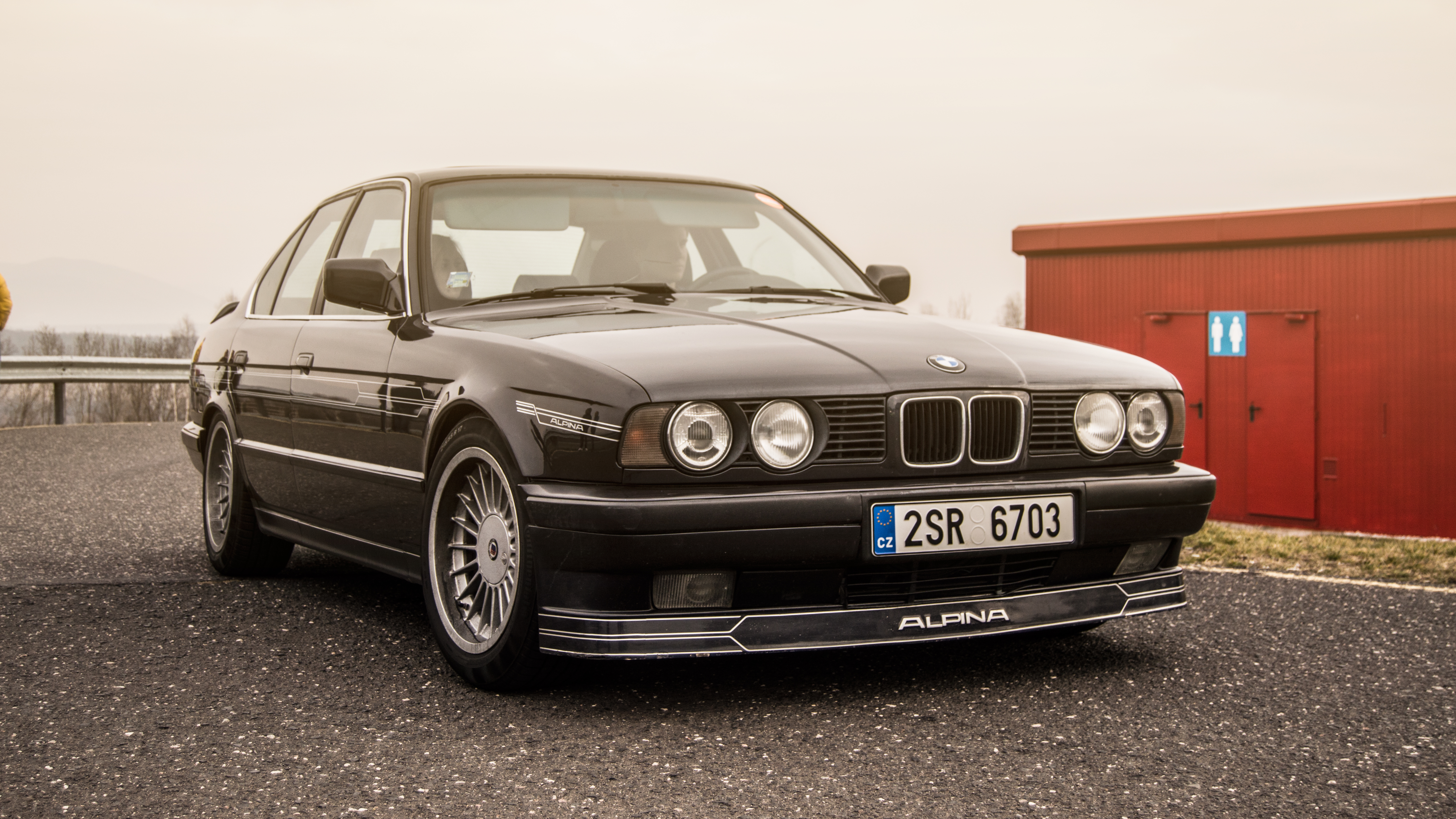
Alpina B10

==== B10 3.5 ====
The B10 3.5 was the first Alpina based on the BMW E34, With production beginning in April 1988 at launch it was the only available B10. The 3.5-liter BMW M30 inline-six cylinder engine of the BMW 535i was reworked with Mahle pistons, a modified cylinder-head, and a new camshaft increasing power from 155 kW (208 hp) to 187 kW (254 PS). In 1992 production was stopped after 572 cars were made.

==== B10 4.0 ====
In 1993 the BMW M30 ended production forcing Alpina to discontinue the B10 3.5 and B10 BiTurbo. In April 1993 Alpina launched their replacement, the first B10 with an eight-cylinder engine. The BMW M60 engine of the BMW 540i was modified with higher-compression Mahle pistons and a modified air intake. Power was increased from 210 kW (286 PS) to 232 kW (311 hp). 49 examples were built.

==== B10 3.0 Allrad ====
The B10 3.0 Allrad was based on the all-wheel drive BMW 525ix, launched in October 1993. The displacement of the six-cylinder single-VANOS and four-valve engine was increased from 2.5 liters to 3.0 liters and the performance was increased from 141 kW (192 PS) to 170 kW (231 PS). 64 sedans and 70 tourings were produced.

==== B10 4.6 ====
The B10 4.6 replaced the B10 biturbo from March 1994 onwards. The engine was a re-designed and enlarged V8 with a displacement of 4.6 liters, which was also used in the E36 Alpina B8 4.6 With 250 kW (340 PS), the power was only just below the B10 Bi-Turbo. 27 saloon cars were produced, and 19 Tourings - all were left hand drive except one right hand drive Touring.

==== Technical specifications ====
Model	B10 3.5	B10 Biturbo	B10 3.0 Allrad / Touring	B10 4.0 / Touring	B10 4.6 / Touring
Platform	BMW 535i E34		BMW 525ix E34	BMW 540i E34	
Production period	4/1988 – 12/1992	8/1989 – 3/1994	10/1993 – 5/1996	4/1993 – 8/1995	3/1994 – 4/1996
Displacement	3430 cm^{3}		2997 cm^{3}	3982 cm^{3}	4619 cm^{3}
Engine architecture	Inline six			V8	
Power	187 kW (254 PS; 251 hp)	265 kW (360 PS; 355 hp)	170 kW (231 PS; 228 hp)	232 kW (315 PS; 311 hp)	250 kW (340 PS; 335 hp)
Torque	325 N⋅m (240 ft⋅lbf)	520 N⋅m (384 ft⋅lbf)	312 N⋅m (230 ft⋅lbf)	410 N⋅m (302 ft⋅lbf)	480 N⋅m (354 ft⋅lbf)
Acceleration, 0–100 km/h (62 mph)	6.4 s	5.6 s	7.9 / 8.4 s	6.5 / 6.7 s	6.1 / 6.2 s
Top speed	250 km/h (155 mph)	over 290 km/h (180 mph)	235 / 230 km/h (146 / 143 mph)	268 / 263 km/h (167 / 163 mph)	over 275 / 270 km/h (171 / 168 mph)

=== E34 B10 BiTurbo ===
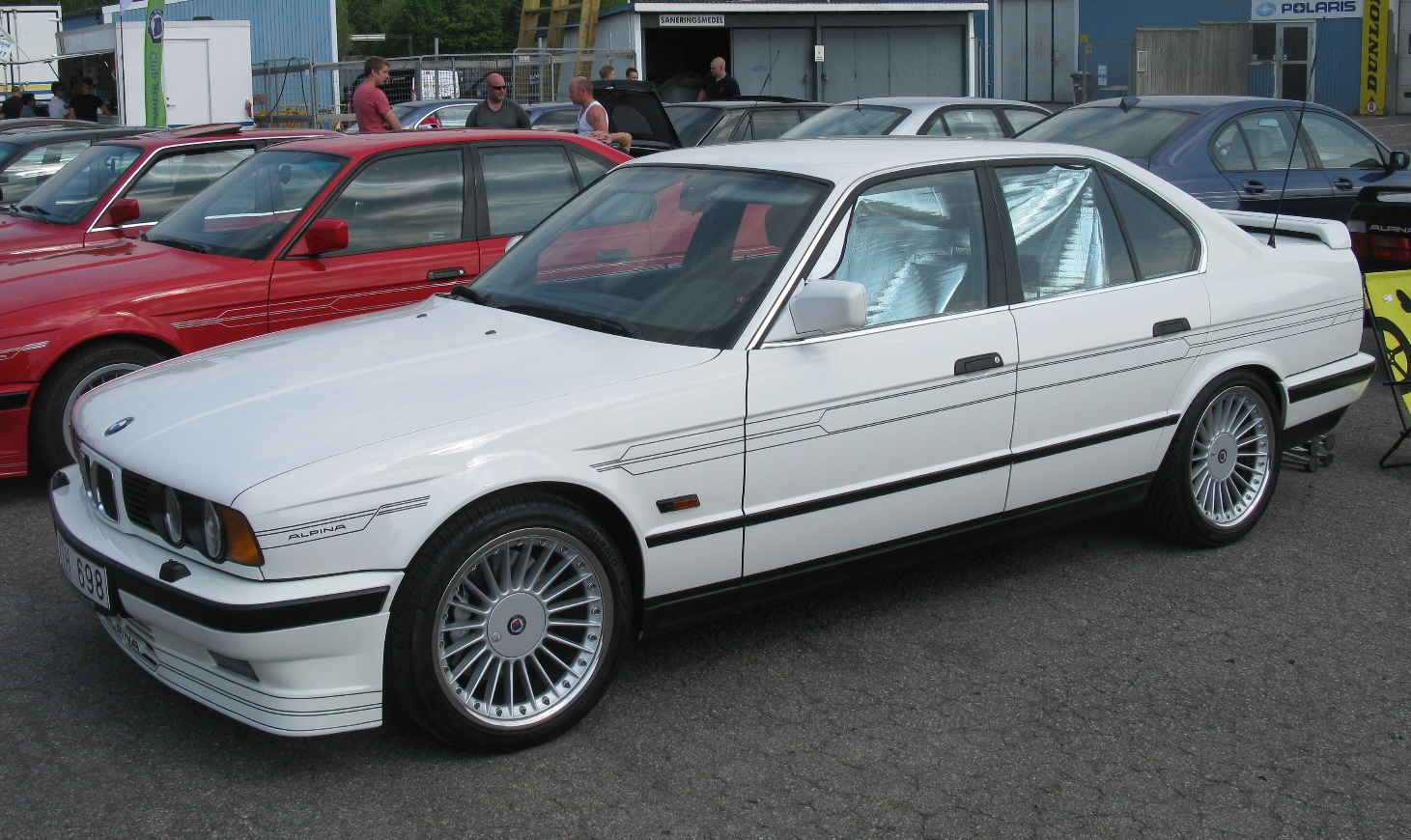
Alpina B10 BiTurbo.

The B10 BiTurbo is a high performance version of the BMW 5 Series E34. Beginning production in 1989, the B10 BiTurbo was based on the 535i and received several upgrades by Alpina, being the fastest production saloon in the world at the time of its introduction, as tested by Road & Track. Production ended in 1994 with 507 examples produced, almost as many as the B10 3.5.

=== E39 B10 ===
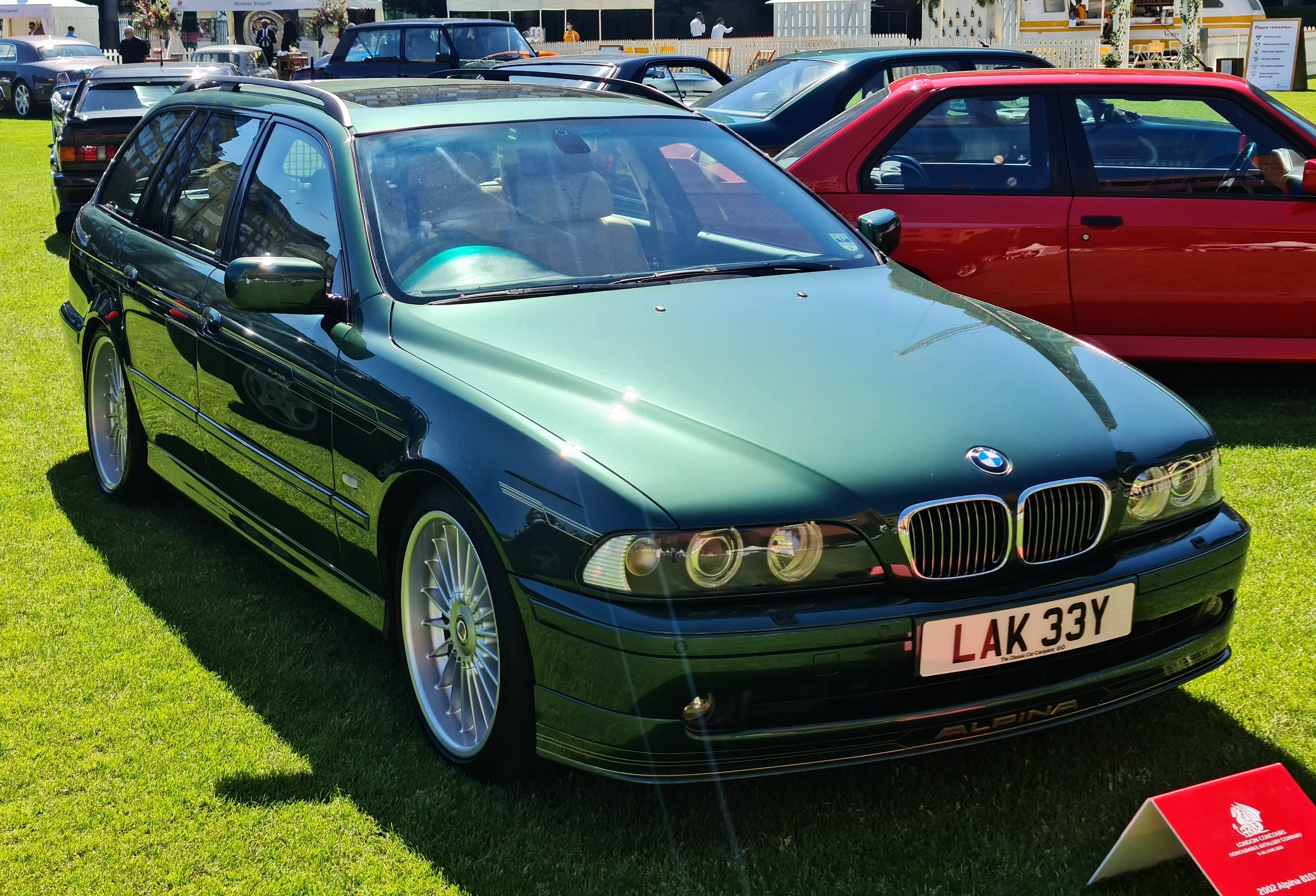
Alpina B10 V8

The B10 was built as a sedan and touring based on the BMW E39 from January 1997 to May 2004.

In February 2000, Alpina introduced the Alpina D10 Biturbo, the first six-cylinder diesel model produced by Alpina. The engine, a 3.0 litre twin turbocharged unit with 182 kW (247 PS) and 500 N⋅m (369 lb⋅ft) of torque, was based on the engine of the BMW 530d. It was at the time the most powerful diesel saloon in the world. High-pressure common-rail injection technology (the famous Bosch CP3 high-pressure pump) has revolutionized the diesel industry.

==== Engines ====
The third generation of the B10 was built with both six-cylinder and V8 engines.

The six-cylinder engines with 3.2 and 3.3 liters displacement were based on the 528i and the 530i. For the 3.3 liter engine the engine block was bored to increase displacement to 3298 cubic centimeters. The cylinder head was machined and a modified crankshaft was added, different pistons and camshafts were also used. A modified intake system enabled a higher rate of air flow, as well as a stainless steel exhaust system (Alpina-Bosal) with metal catalytic converters. The engine control unit was also completely revised, which increased the power to 206 kW (280 PS; 276 hp).

The two V8 engines with 4.6 (B10 V8) and 4.8 liters (B10 V8S) come from the BMW 540i. Again, a larger displacement was achieved by boring the engine block, which, together with other modifications, increased the power to 250 kW (340 PS), then to 255 kW (347 PS) for the 4.6 liter engine, and 276 kW (375 PS) through an increased stroke with the 4.8 liter engine.

==== Suspension ====
The original suspension from the BMW E39 has been reworked for the B10. Changes include modified springs and tuned shock absorbers from Sachs that help lower the car.

==== Technical data ====
Model	Engine	Power	Torque	Years
B10 3.2	BMW M52; I6	191 kW (260 PS; 256 hp) at 5,900 rpm	330 N⋅m (243 ft⋅lbf) at 4,300 rpm	8/1997–12/1998
B10 3.3	BMW M52; I6	206 kW (280 PS; 276 hp) at 6,200 rpm	335 N⋅m (247 ft⋅lbf) at 4,500 rpm	2/1999–10/2003
B10 V8	M62B46; V8	250 kW (340 PS; 335 hp)	470 N⋅m (347 ft⋅lbf)	1/1997–10/1998
B10 V8	M62TUB46; V8	255 kW (347 PS; 342 hp)	480 N⋅m (354 ft⋅lbf)	10/1998–9/2002
B10 V8S	Alpina F5; V8	280 kW (381 PS; 375 hp)	519 N⋅m (383 ft⋅lbf)	1/2002–5/2004
D10 Biturbo	M57D30; I6	180 kW (245 PS; 241 hp)	500 N⋅m (369 ft⋅lbf)	4/2000–10/2003

=== E60 B5 ===
The BMW E60 and the 4.4-liter BMW N62 engine from the 545i serve as the basis for the Alpina B5, which uses the same H1 supercharged engine as the E65 B7. Compared to the E60, the B5 has larger brakes, a new suspension with Electronic Damper Control, a stainless steel silencing system with polished double tailpipes and the typical Alpina changes to the interior and exterior.

The B5 was made from February 2005 to September 2007 and the B5 S was made from September 2007 to May 2010.

==== Drivetrain ====
The N62B44's output is increased by means of a centrifugal supercharger. The supercharger is made by the company ASA, and is also called "Turbessor" because it is able to combine the advantages of turbocharger and supercharger. At low speeds, it spontaneously responds as a conventional displacement compressor, but it can also immediately provide the thrust of a turbo. It also reaches speeds of more than 100,000 revolutions per minute. As compared to the 545i performance has increased from 245 kW (333 PS; 329 hp) to 368 kW (500 PS; 493 hp), torque was increased from 450 N⋅m (332 ft⋅lbf) to 700 N⋅m (516 ft⋅lbf). The power is transmitted to the rear wheels by means of a six-speed automatic transmission (6HP 26). As usual with Alpina, this was refined and has "Switch-Tronic".

==== Technical data ====
Alpina B5	Sedan	Touring
Displacement	4398 cm^{3}	
Compression ratio	9,0:1	
Horsepower	368 kW (500 PS; 493 hp) at 5500–6000 rpm	
Torque	700 N⋅m (516 ft⋅lbf) at 4250–4850 rpm	
Transmission	6-speed automatic "Switch-Tronic"	
Top speed	314 km/h (195 mph)	310 km/h (193 mph)
Acceleration 0–100 km/h (62 mph)	4.7 s	4.8 s
Empty weight	1,720 kg (3,792 lb)	1,810 kg (3,990 lb)

==== Note ====
In 2005, an Alpina B5 Touring was tested by Auto, Motor und Sport on the Nardò Ring. The B5 reached a top speed of 319 km/h (198 mph).

=== B5 S ===
At the 2007 Frankfurt Motor Show (IIA), Alpina presented the revised B5 S.

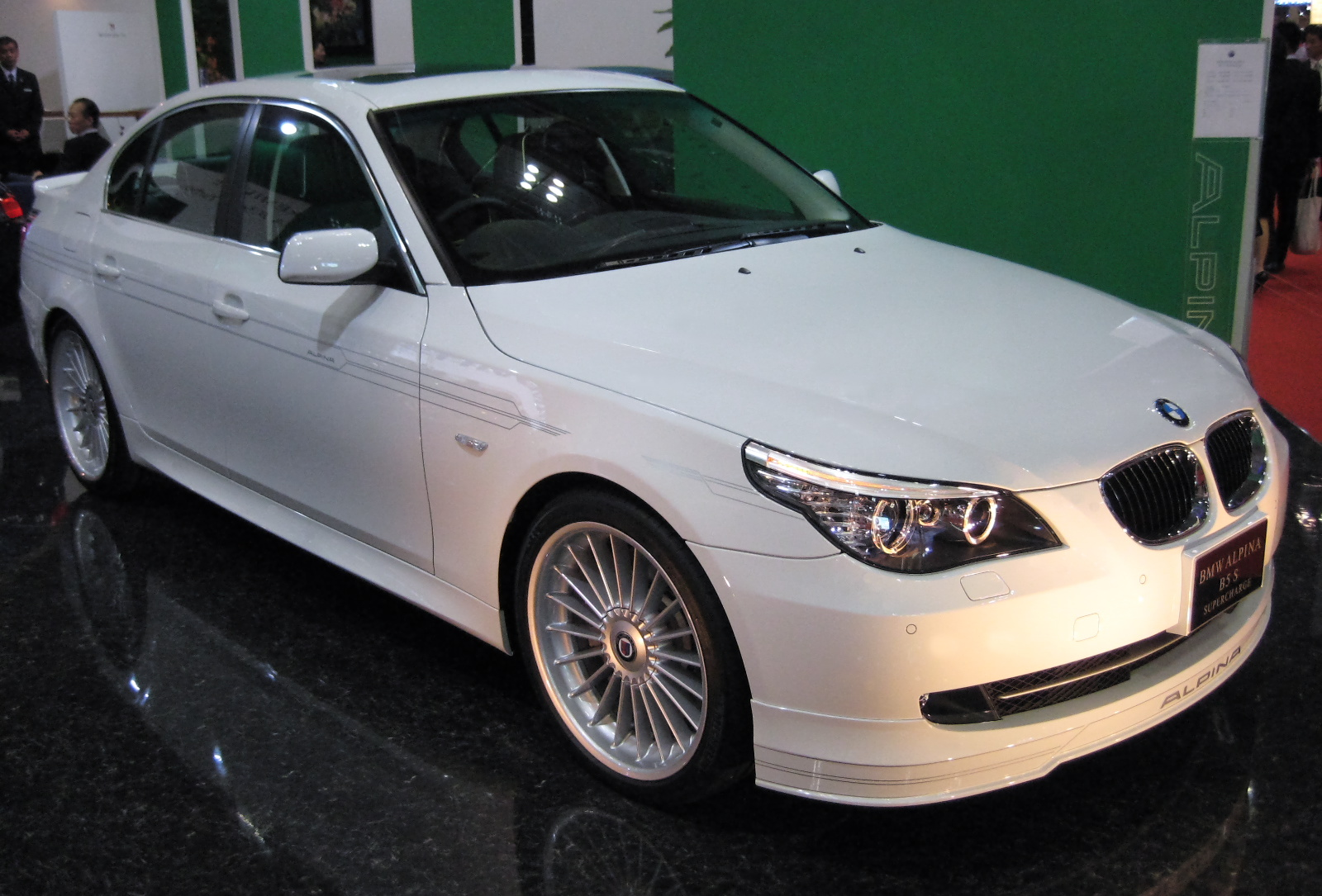
Alpina B5 S

==== Engine ====
The motor's combustion process was optimized by changing the camshaft. This resulted in a significantly lower exhaust gas temperature, which is the basis for the performance increase. The power of the 4.4-liter V8 was thus increased by 22 kW (30 PS; 30 hp) to 390 kW (530 PS; 523 hp). The torque increased by 25 N⋅m (18 ft⋅lbf) to 725 N⋅m (535 ft⋅lbf). The B5 S completes the sprint to 100 km/h (62 mph) in 4.6 seconds; The top speed increases to 317 km/h (197 mph).

==== Transmission ====
One innovation is the ZF six-speed Sport-Switch-Tronic transmission. The switching time was reduced by 50% compared to the predecessor. The reaction time is 1/10 s. In manual mode, the driving feeling is similar to the shift dynamics of a dual clutch transmission.

==== Chassis ====
A further feature is the EDC suspension tuning with the company Sachs Race Engineering.

==== Technical data ====
Alpina B5S	Sedan	Touring
Displacement	4398 cm^{3}	
Compression ratio	9,0:1	
Horsepower	390 kW (530 PS; 523 hp) at 5500 rpm	
Torque	725 N⋅m (535 ft⋅lbf) at 4750 rpm	
Transmission	6-Speed Automatic "Switch-Tronic"	
Top speed	317 km/h (197 mph)	313 km/h (194 mph)
Acceleration 0–100 km/h (62 mph)	4.6 s	4.7 s
Empty weight	1,720 kg (3,792 lb)	1,810 kg (3,990 lb)

=== F10 B5 ===
Alpina produced two variants based on the BMW 5 Series (F10), the petrol-engined B5 and diesel-engined D5.

==== B5 Bi-Turbo ====
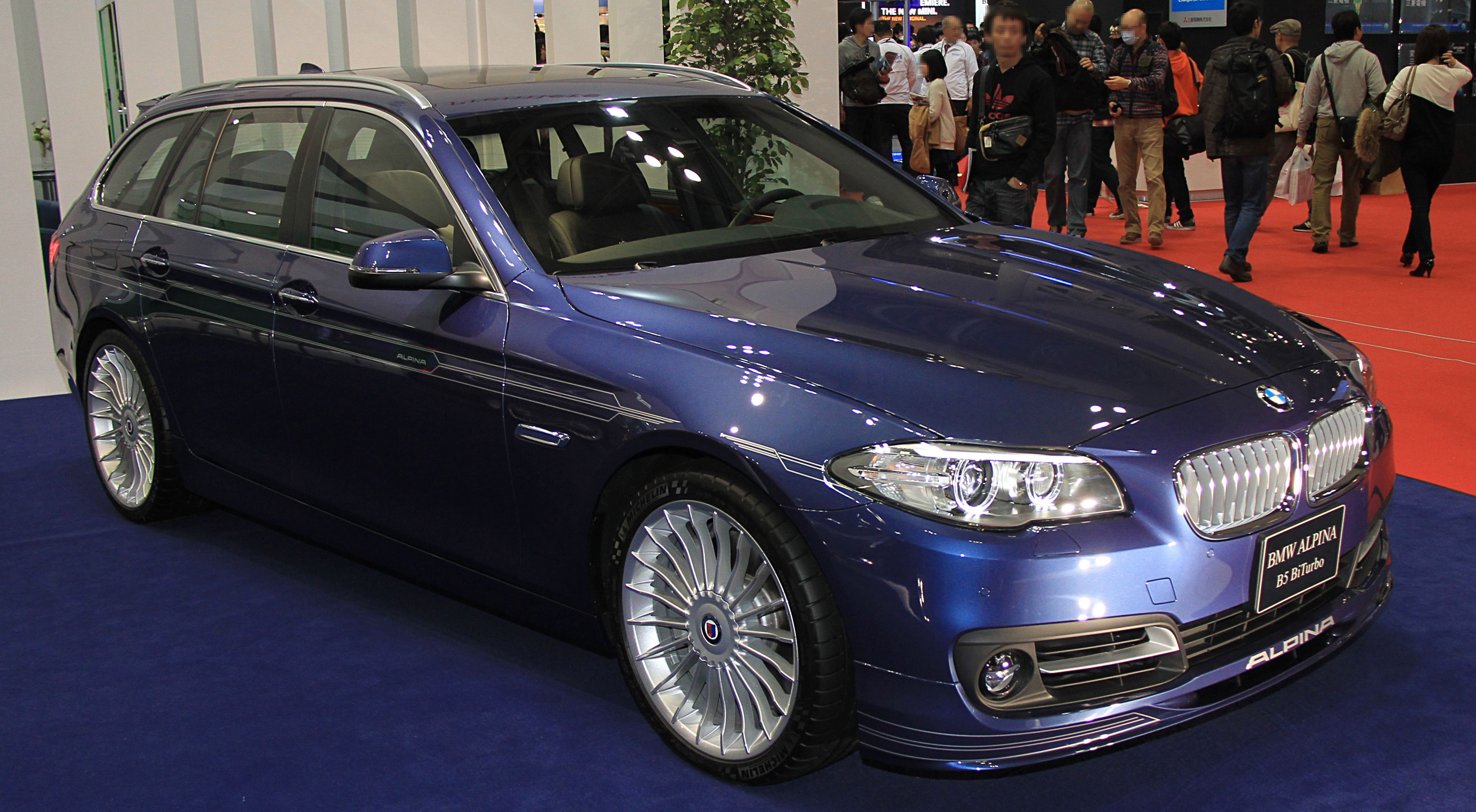
Alpina B5 Bi-Turbo Touring

The B5 is based on the 550i and is powered by an Alpina-modified version of the BMW N63 twin-turbo V8 engine. The original B5, which was unveiled at the 2010 Goodwood Festival of Speed, produced 373 kW (507 PS) and 700 N⋅m (516 lb⋅ft). The transmission is an 8-speed automatic.

Alpina unveiled an updated B5 at the 2012 Geneva Motor Show. Power had been uprated to 397 kW (540 PS) and torque to 730 N⋅m (538 lb⋅ft). During 2015, Alpina sold the B5 Bi-Turbo Edition 50, which marked the company's 50th year in operation. The Edition 50 uses an upgraded engine which produces 441 kW (600 PS) and 800 N⋅m (590 lb⋅ft). The standard B5 received this same engine for the B5's last year of production, 2016.

==== D5 Bi-Turbo ====
The D5 Bi-Turbo is based on the 535d. It is powered by Alpina-modified version of the BMW N57 turbo straight-6 engine, which produces 257 kW (349 PS) and 700 N⋅m (516 lb⋅ft) of torque.

=== G30 B5 Bi-Turbo ===
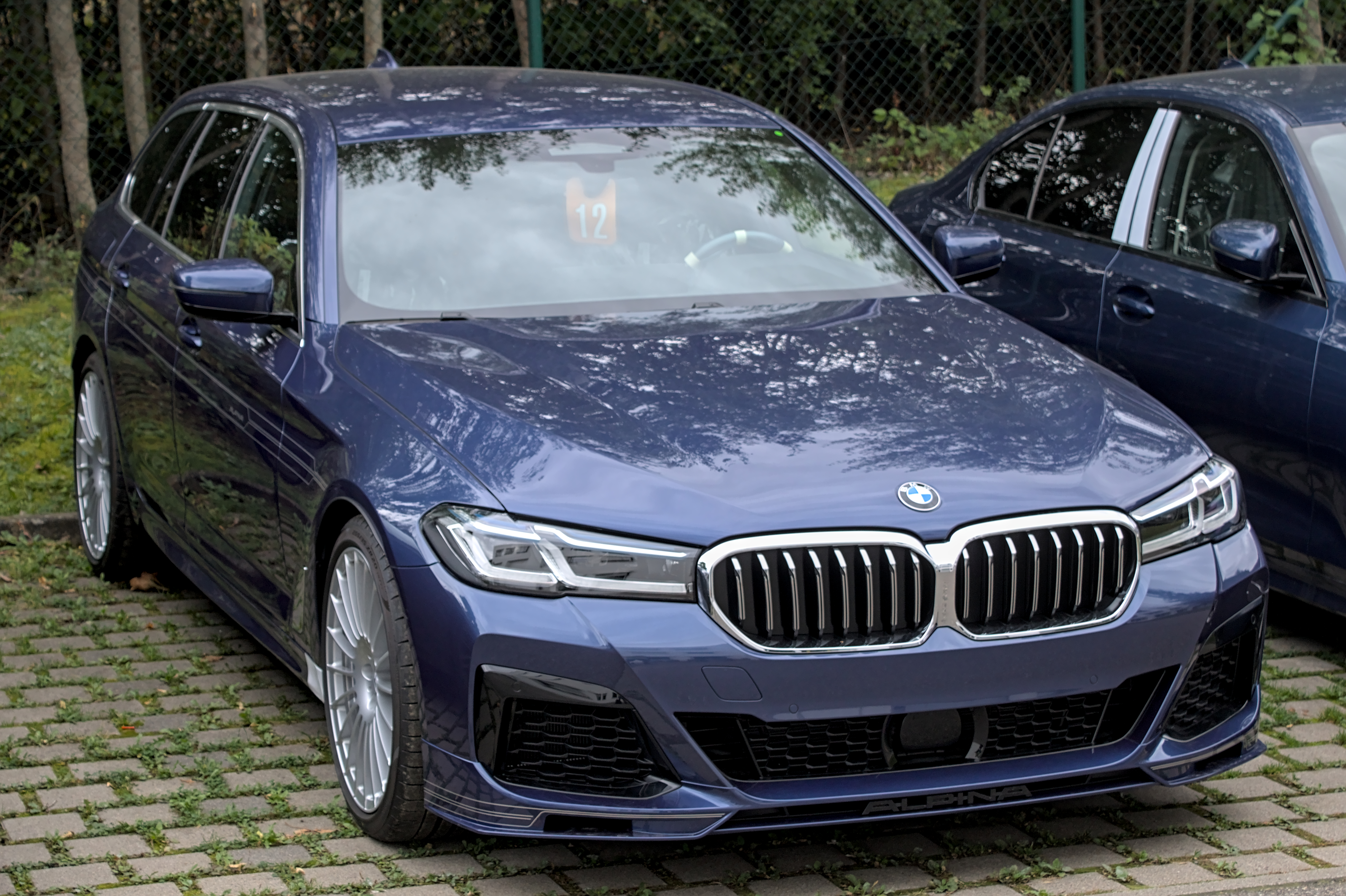
Alpina B5 Bi-Turbo Touring.

The Alpina B5 was introduced at the 2017 Geneva Motor Show in all-wheel drive Saloon or Touring versions. The B5 features a 4.4-litre N63M30 V8 engine that generates a maximum power output of 447 kW (608 PS; 599 hp) and 800 N⋅m (590 lb⋅ft) of torque. Based on the N63B44O2 V8, it has uprated pistons, new twin-scroll Garrett turbochargers and new spark plugs by NGK. The B5 can accelerate from 0–100 km/h (0–62 mph) in 3.5 seconds with a top speed of 330 km/h (205 mph) for the Saloon, and 325 km/h (202 mph) for the Touring, making it the fastest production estate car in production at that time.

=== G30 D5 S ===
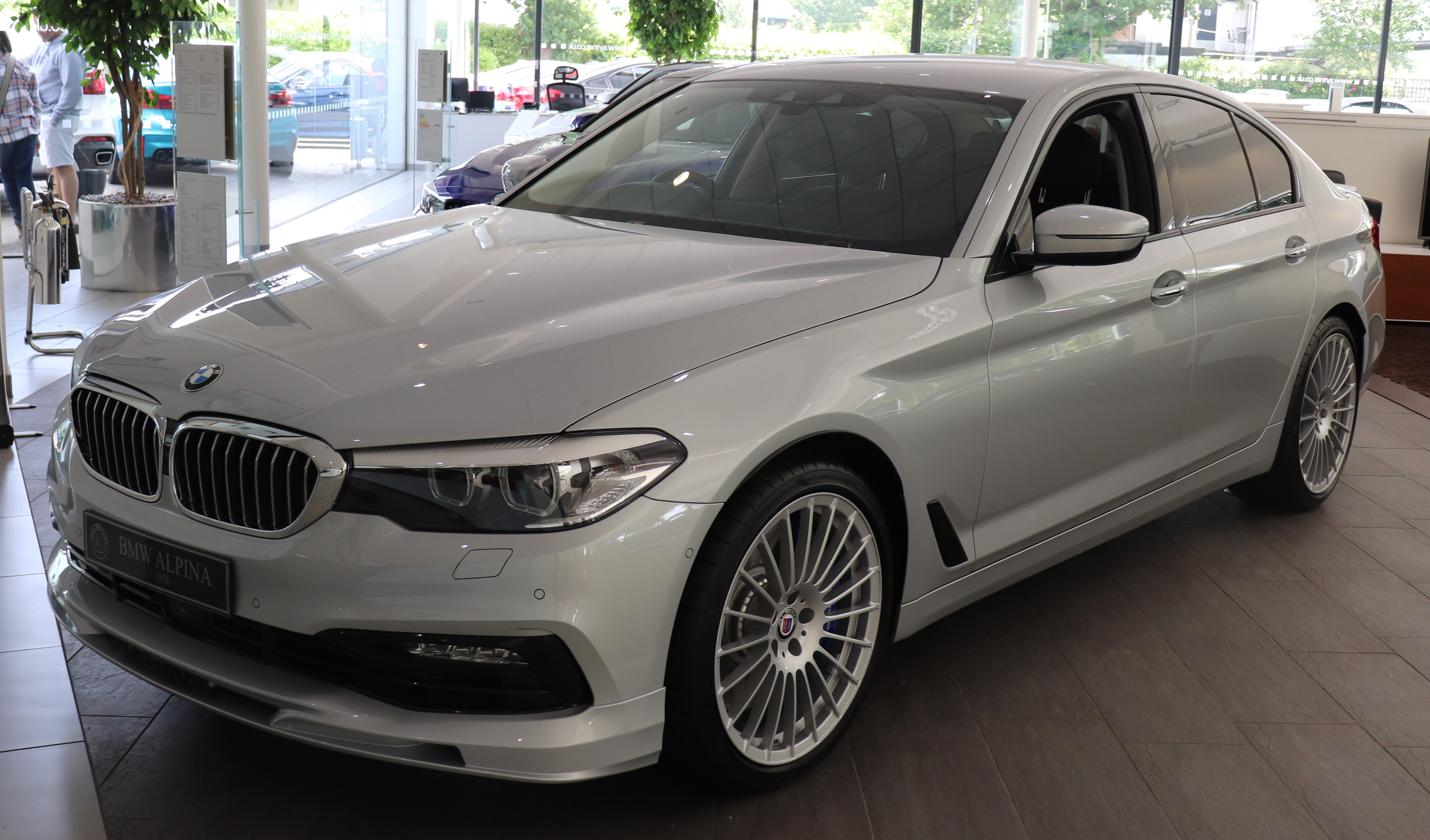
Alpina D5 S

The Alpina D5 S debuted at the 2017 Frankfurt Motor Show in all-wheel drive only sedan and Touring variants. The D5 S uses a modified 3.0-liter B57D30 diesel inline-six engine. The engine has three turbochargers and produces 285 kW (387 PS; 382 hp) and 800 N⋅m (590 lb⋅ft) of torque in left-hand drive markets, whereas it has two turbochargers and produces 240 kW (326 PS; 322 hp) and 700 N⋅m (516 lb⋅ft) of torque in right-hand drive markets. The left-hand drive D5 S saloon has a top speed of 286 km/h (178 mph) and a 0–100 km/h (62 mph) acceleration time of 4.4 seconds. Alpina claims it is the fastest diesel-powered production car in the world. The right-hand drive, saloon-only version has a 0–100 km/h (62 mph) acceleration time of 4.9 seconds and a top speed of 275 km/h (171 mph).

== 6 Series based Alpinas ==
=== Alpina B6 Gran Coupé ===
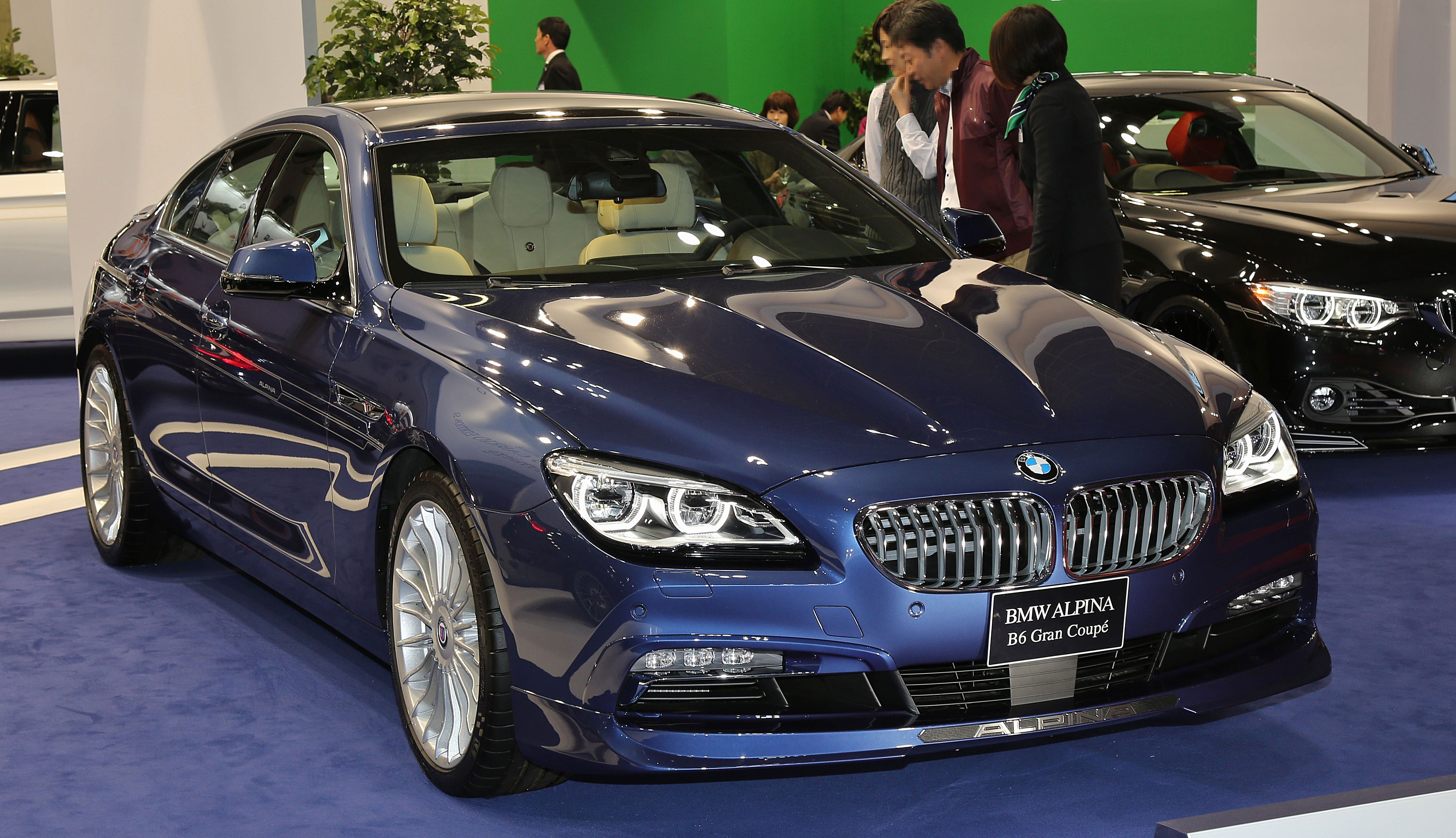
Alpina B6 Gran Coupé at the Tokyo Motor Show in 2015.

The Alpina B6 Gran Coupé xDrive was launched in 2014. This model is conceived by Alpina and based on the 650i. This model is sold by BMW only in the United States and in Canada (but Alpina also independently offers it in other countries). The Alpina B6 Gran Coupé 2015 model shares the 540 hp (403 kW; 547 PS), 730 N⋅m (538 lb⋅ft) 4.4-litre twin-turbo V8 of the Alpina B5 BiTurbo and B6 BiTurbo coupé which are not sold in North America. The 2016-2019 model produces 600 hp (447 kW; 608 PS) and 590 lb⋅ft (800 N⋅m) of torque. Specification includes a more luxurious interior, 20-inch Alpina light-alloy wheels, aerodynamic elements and exclusive Alpina trims and paints. The Alpina B6 can go from 0–100 km/h (62 mph) in 3.9 (3.8 for the 2016-2019 model) seconds and has a top speed of 318 km/h (198 mph). (324 km/h or 202 mph for the 2016-2019 model)

== 7 Series based Alpinas ==
=== E38 B12 ===
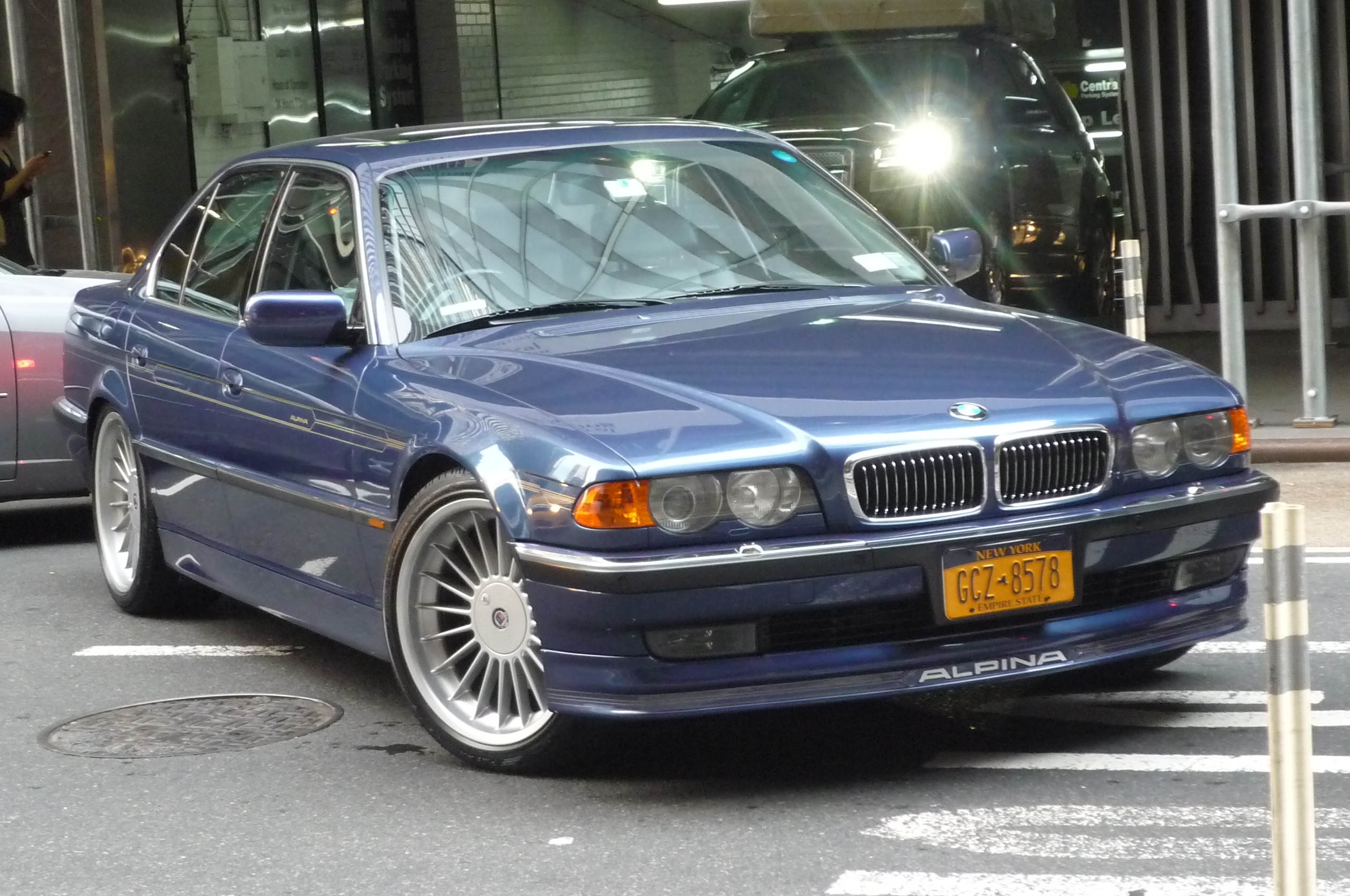
Alpina B12 6.0

Based on the BMW 750i and 750iL, Alpina released the B12 5.7 in 1995 and the B12 6.0 in 1999. In contrast to the cars they are based on, these models are not electronically limited to a top speed of 250 km/h (155 mph), but are able to reach top speeds of more than 280 km/h (174 mph) and 291 km/h (181 mph), respectively. According to Alpina, the B12 5.7 was the world's first production vehicle with an electrically heated metal catalyst as standard. The B12 5.7 has a 5.7 litre V12 and the B12 6.0 has a 6.0 litre V12.

Model	Engine	Power	Torque	Years	Production
B12 5.7	V12	285 kW (387 PS; 382 hp)	560 N⋅m (413 lb⋅ft)	12/1995–08/1998	202
B12 6.0	V12	316 kW (430 PS; 424 hp)	600 N⋅m (443 lb⋅ft)	07/1999–07/2001	94

=== E65 B7 ===
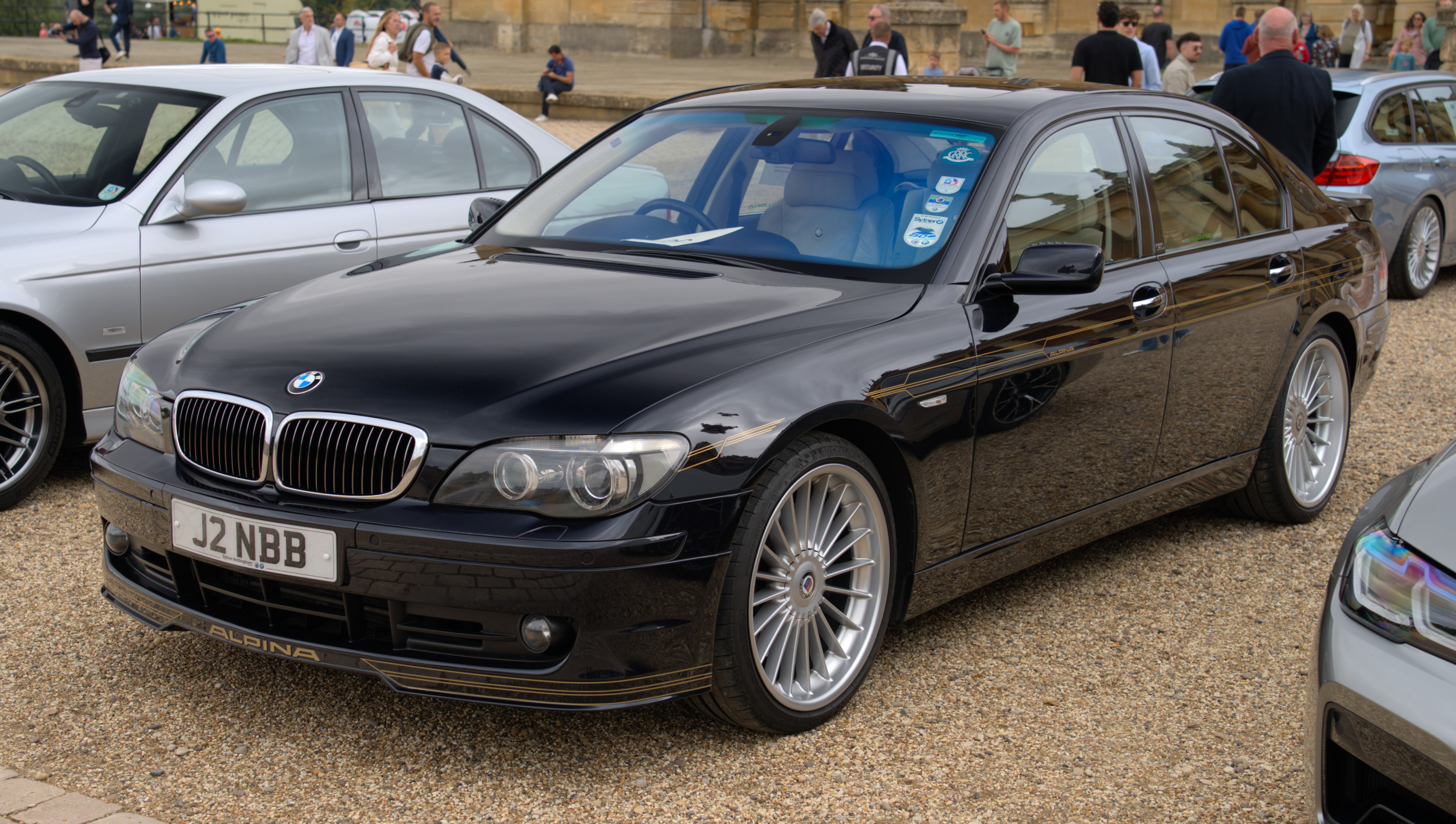
2006 Alpina B7, based on the E65 platform

Based on the E65 7 Series generation, the B7 was officially introduced to the public at the 2003 Frankfurt Motor Show, and was available in normal and long-wheelbase versions.

The E65 B7 uses a supercharged version of the 4.4-litre N62 V8 found in the BMW 745i, as the 750i and its 4.8-litre engine were not around when development began. The engine uses a centrifugal type supercharger, the first to be used on an Alpina automobile. The 760Li's naturally aspirated 6.0-litre V12 was deemed too heavy to have a sporty offshoot.

BMW of North America, LLC offered 800 Alpina B7s as limited edition models for 2007 and 2008, all of which quickly sold out.

=== F01/F02 B7 ===
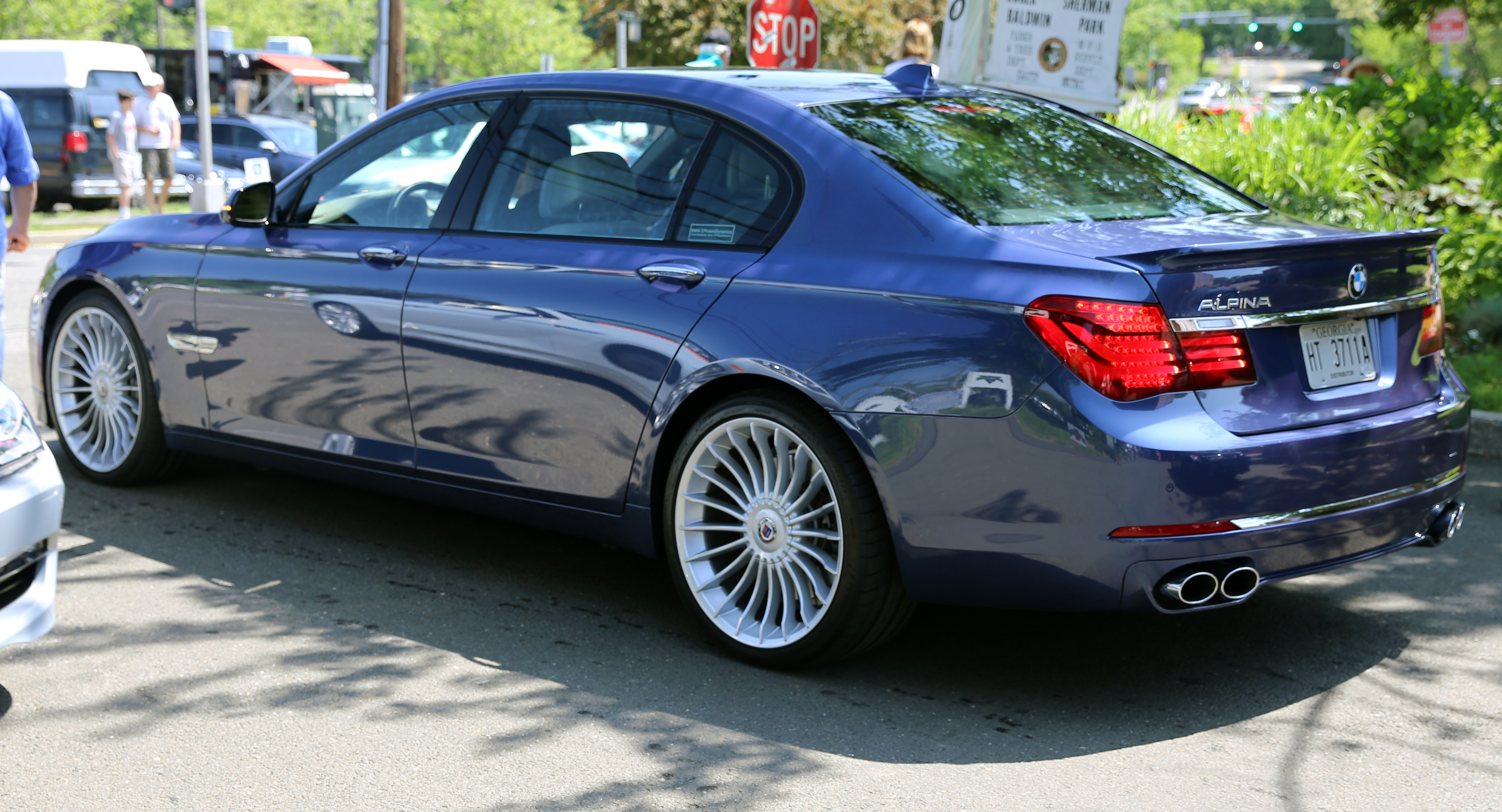
2013 Alpina B7, based on the F02 model BMW. Lightly facelifted for 2013.

The F01 B7 was offered again for the 2011 model year in the US, with approximately 500 vehicles (half of the annual production of the B7) with a choice of rear-wheel drive or all-wheel drive and/or a standard or long wheelbase (the B7, B7 L (long wheelbase), B7 xDrive (all-wheel drive), and B7 L xDrive), otherwise all configurations have the same equipment. Roughly 80 units were planned to be sold in Canada, all of the xDrive variety due to the country's winter weather.

The B7's twin-turbo 4.4-litre V8 is assembled by hand at Alpina's facility in Buchloe, Germany, before being shipped to BMW for installation, and the assembled vehicle is then sent back to Alpina for finishing touches. It is based upon BMW's N63 twin-turbo V8 but produces considerable more torque and horsepower, albeit with some turbo lag due to the larger turbos, yet more measured throttle mapping makes the B7 smoother than a stock BMW 750i. The 2011 Alpina B7, with its twin-turbo 4.4-litre V8 engine and 6-speed automatic transmission, is less expensive and yet faster than its F01 stablemate, the 2010 BMW 760Li powered by a twin-turbo 6.0-litre V12 mated to an 8-speed automatic transmission. The B7's engine, derived from the BMW N63 that is found in the standard BMW lineup, matches the BMW 750i in fuel economy despite increased performance, plus its lighter weight than the 760Li's V12 engine gives the B7 considerably better weight distribution and handling than the 760Li.

While BMW uses run-flat tires for its 7 Series, the B7 comes with non-reinforced tires with a tire repair kit for emergencies. By using conventional, softer-sidewalled tires, compared to the reinforced sidewalls of run-flats, Alpina engineers were able to stiffen the B7's suspension for better handling and still improve the ride quality over that of a stock BMW 750i.

For the 2013 model year, the Alpina B7 received similar updates to the rest of the 7 Series lineup, including an 8-speed automatic transmission, while its engine adds Valvetronic and now produces 540 hp (403 kW; 547 PS) and 538 lb⋅ft (729 N⋅m), which is good for a 0–100 km/h (62 mph) time of 4.3 seconds and a top speed of 300 km/h (186 mph). Compared to BMW M's version of the 4.4L twin-turbo engine (such as found in the F10 M5), Alpina's engine has 20 hp (15 kW; 20 PS) less but more maximum torque which is also available at a lower rpm.

In a comparison of the 2013 BMW 7 series and the Alpina B7, Motor Trend stated the B7 handled better than the BMW 760iL, but not as well as the 750iL.

=== G12 B7 ===
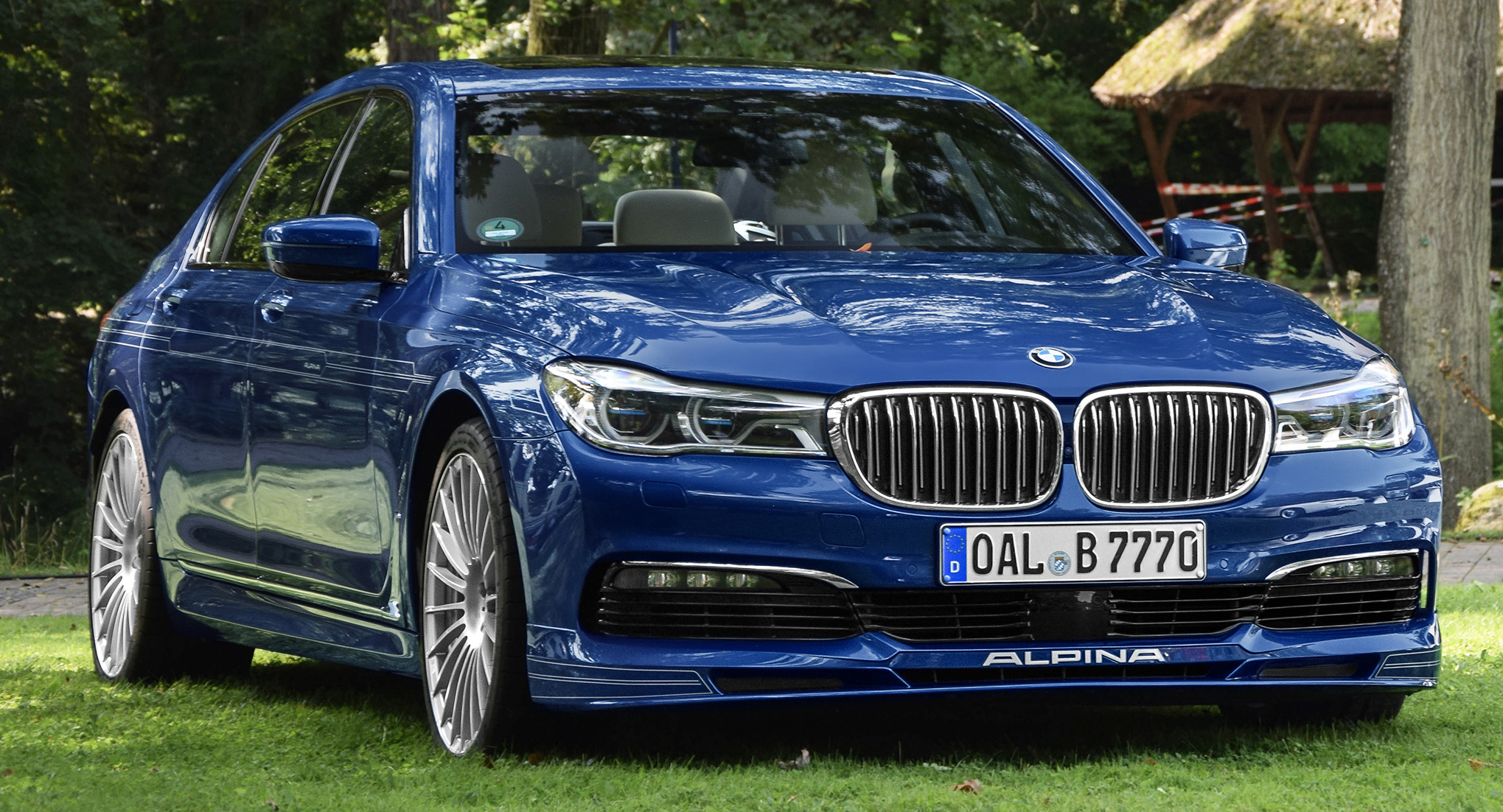
Alpina B7 Bi-Turbo

The Alpina B7 is one of the two Alpina cars offered in the US and Canada, the other one being the Alpina B6. The B7 is produced at the same assembly line in Dingolfing, Germany, along with BMW's own 7 Series. It can be equipped identically to a normal M760Li. However, an exclusive Alpina Green finish is available.

BMW permitted Alpina to produce a high-performance version of its flagship 7 Series, however they did not want it to be a high-revving, BMW M version (which would have been known as a "BMW M7" under the current nomenclature). It has also been suggested that there was no market for an M7 that would have featured the BMW M's trademark high-rev engine and twin-clutch automated manual transmission, and most customers who desired a performance option in the 7 Series would have gone for the V12-engined BMW 760Li.

Competitors include the Mercedes-Benz S63 AMG and Audi S8.

B7 xDrive

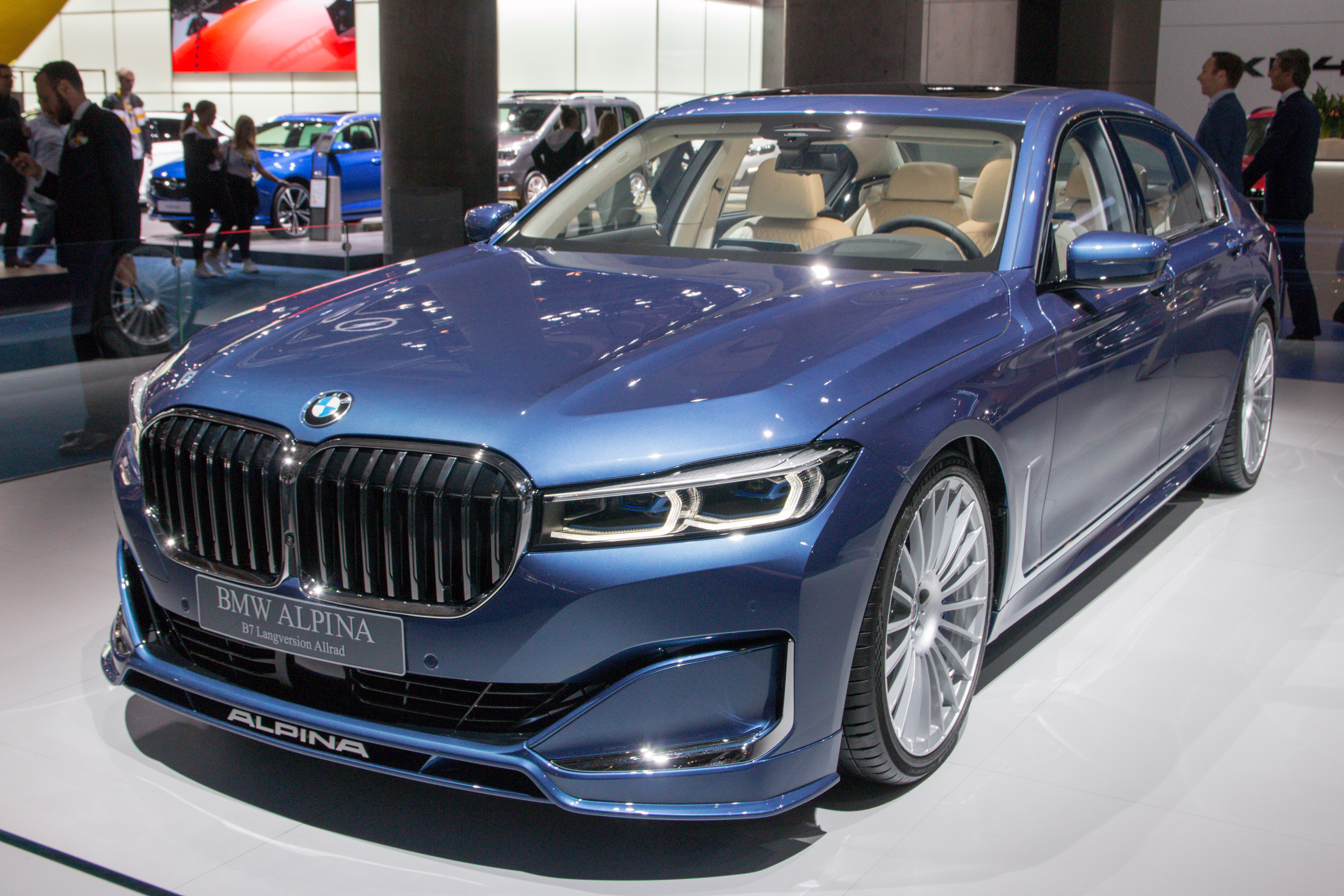
Alpina B7 (post-facelift)

The Alpina B7 xDrive was announced by BMW North America on 8 February 2016 with sales starting in September 2016. With an electronically limited top speed of 310 km/h (193 mph) and a 0–100 km/h (62 mph) acceleration time of 3.7 seconds along with a sportier setup, it is the sportiest 7 Series but is sold by BMW only in the United States and Canada. The B7 is sold in other countries by Alpina as the B7 Bi-Turbo, with a delimited top speed of 330 km/h (205 mph).

The Alpina B7 features a 447 kW (608 PS; 599 hp) 4.4 litre twin-turbocharged V8 engine delivering 608 PS (447 kW; 600 hp) and 800 N⋅m (590 lb⋅ft) of torque, as well as a more luxurious interior. It was unveiled at the 2016 Geneva Motor Show.

The facelifted model, unveiled in February 2019, has an improved power band, now producing 608 PS (447 kW; 600 hp), which allows for better performance, with a 0–100 km/h (62 mph) acceleration time of 3.6 seconds. The top speed of 330 km/h (205 mph) is now delimited worldwide.

== 8 Series based Alpinas ==
=== E31 B12 ===
==== B12 5.0 ====
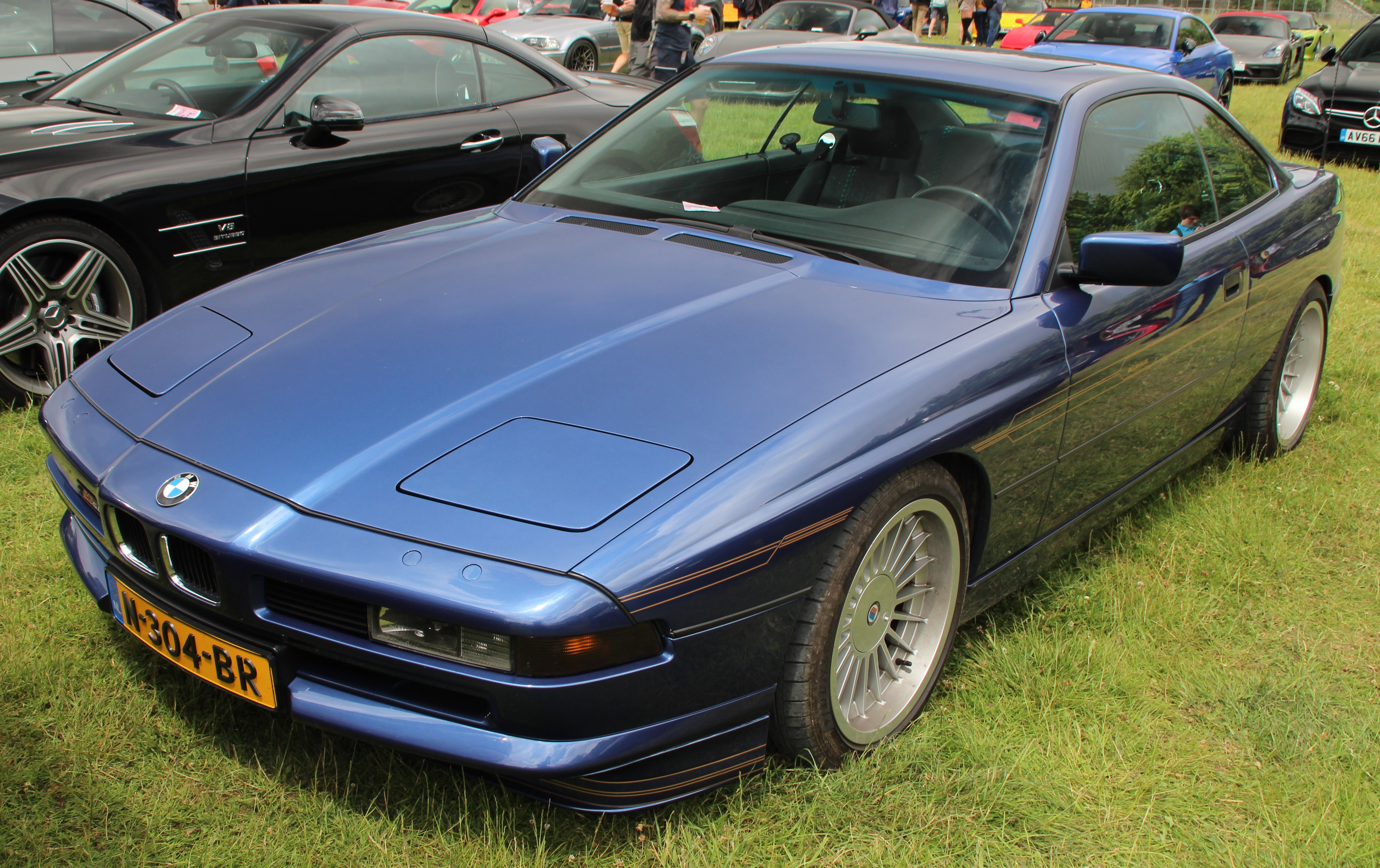
Alpina B12 5.0

The B12 5.0 was built from 1990 to 1994 and is based on the BMW E31 850i. It is powered by an Alpina modified BMW M70 V12 (shared with the E32 B12 5.0) producing 257 kW (349 PS; 345 hp) and mated to an automatic transmission.

==== B12 5.7 ====
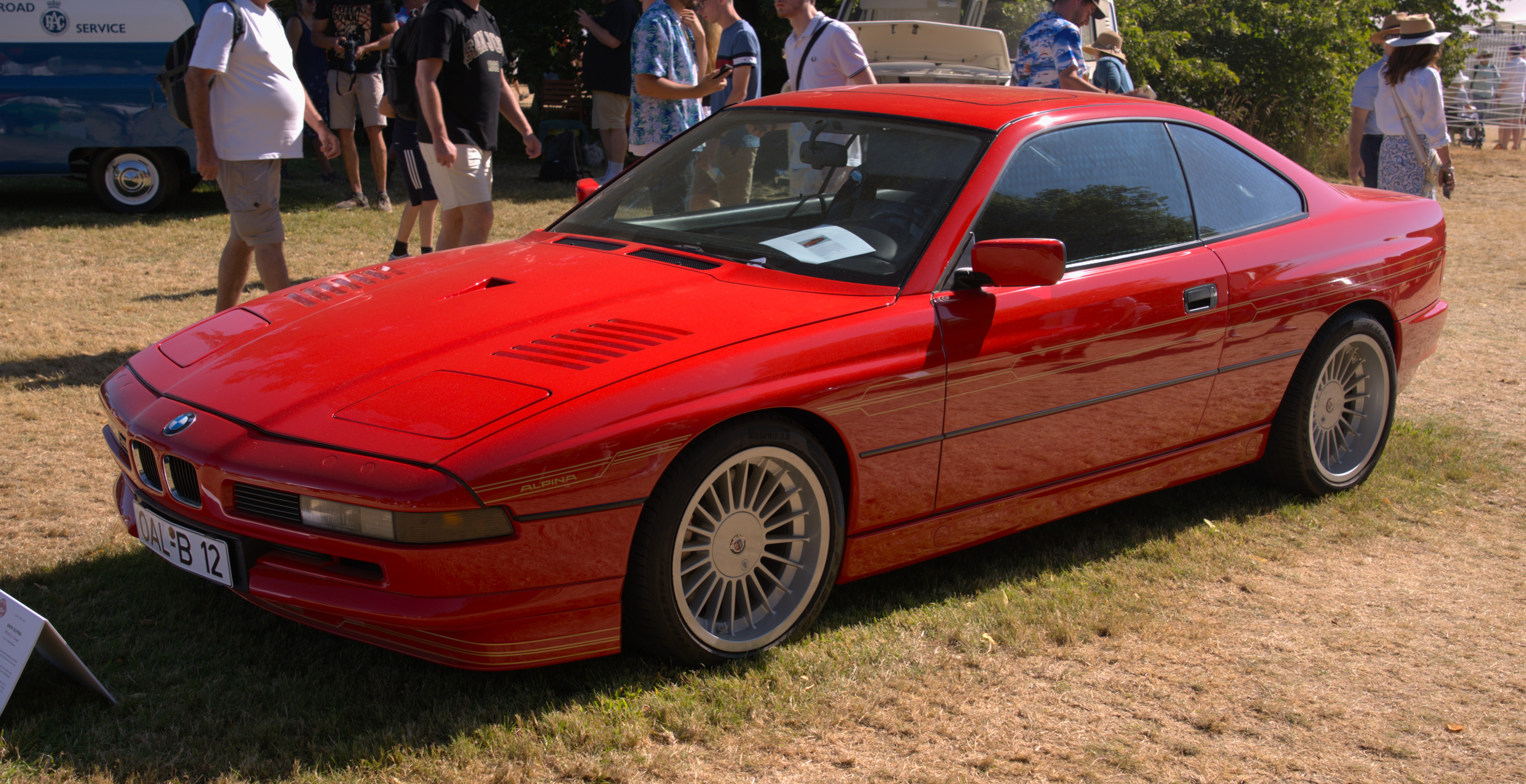
Alpina B12 5.7

The B12 5.7 was available from 1992 and is based on the 850CSi. It is powered by an increased displacement version of the BMW S70 V12 with a modified intake, crankshaft. camshafts and a stainless steel exhaust system as well as a six speed manual gearbox with an optional system called Shift-Tronic that automatically actuates the clutch when shifting and allows the vehicle to creep in traffic, 32 B12 5.7s were equipped with Shift-Tronic. it produced 306 kW (416 PS; 410 hp). The carbon-fibre hood has cooling vents and a NACA duct.

=== G16 B8 ===
==== B8 Gran Coupé ====
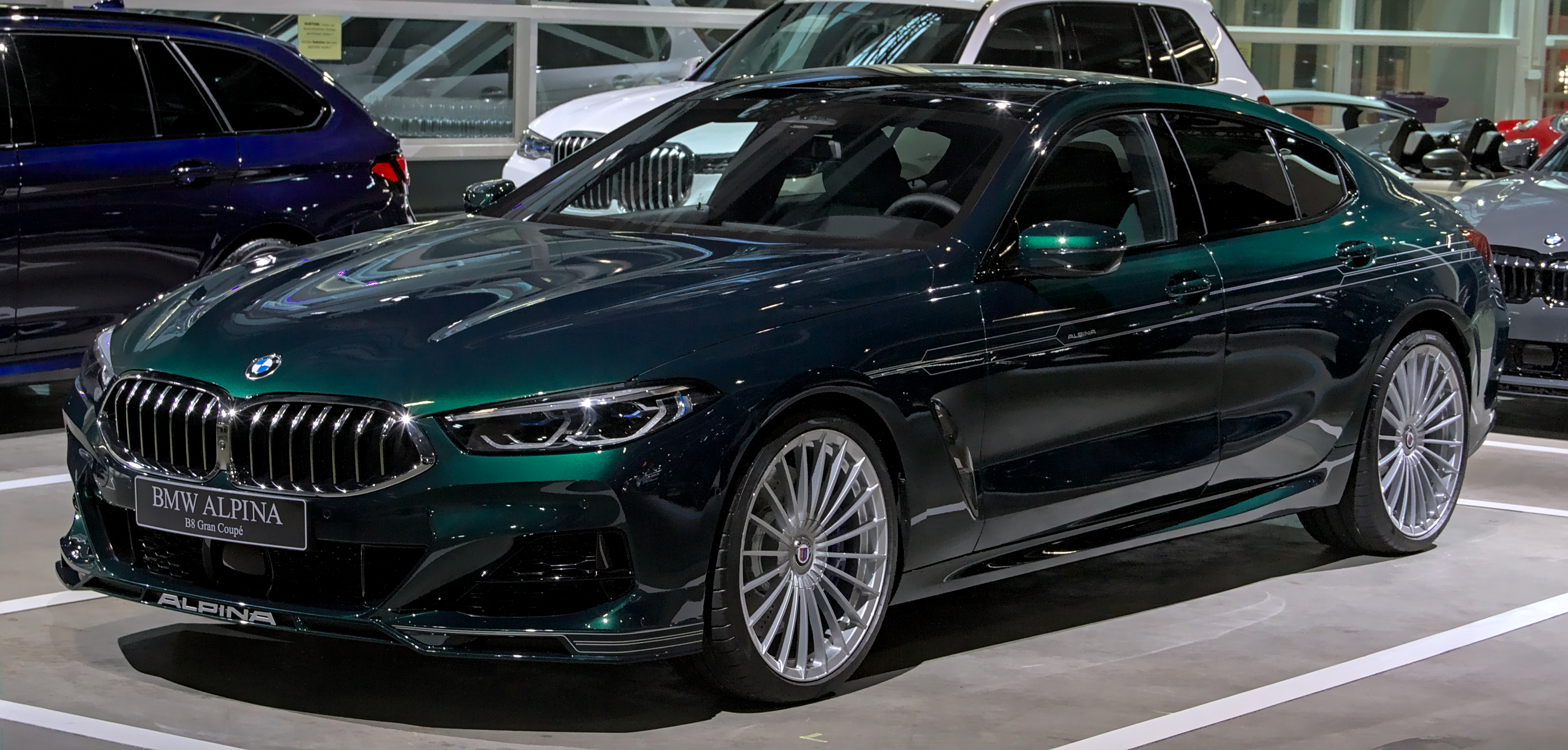
Alpina B8 Gran Coupé

The Alpina B8 Gran Coupé was available in 2021 and is based on the BMW M850i and M8 Gran Coupé's respectively. Powered by an Alpina tuned version of BMW's N63 4.4L V8 Bi-Turbo, the B8 produces 630 PS (463 kW; 621 hp) and 800 N⋅m (590 lbf⋅ft) of torque. Alpina tuned suspension and handling provided drivers with a Comfort+ and Sport+ mode for ideal ride comfort and performance. The exterior sports Alpina Classic 21 inch wheels featuring 20 spokes per wheel, Alpina designed front and rear bumpers, and a choice of Alpina blue or green metallic paint. The interior features Alpina trim appointments, custom Alpina leather upholstery, and or BMW Individual trims and upholstery.

==== Technical data ====
Model	Engine	Power	Torque	Years	Production
B12 5.0	V12	257 kW (349 PS; 345 hp)	470 N⋅m (347 lb⋅ft)	6/1990-5/1994	97
B12 5.7	V12	306 kW (416 PS; 410 hp)	570 N⋅m (420 lb⋅ft)	11/1992-11/1996	57

== SUV based Alpinas ==
=== XD3 ===
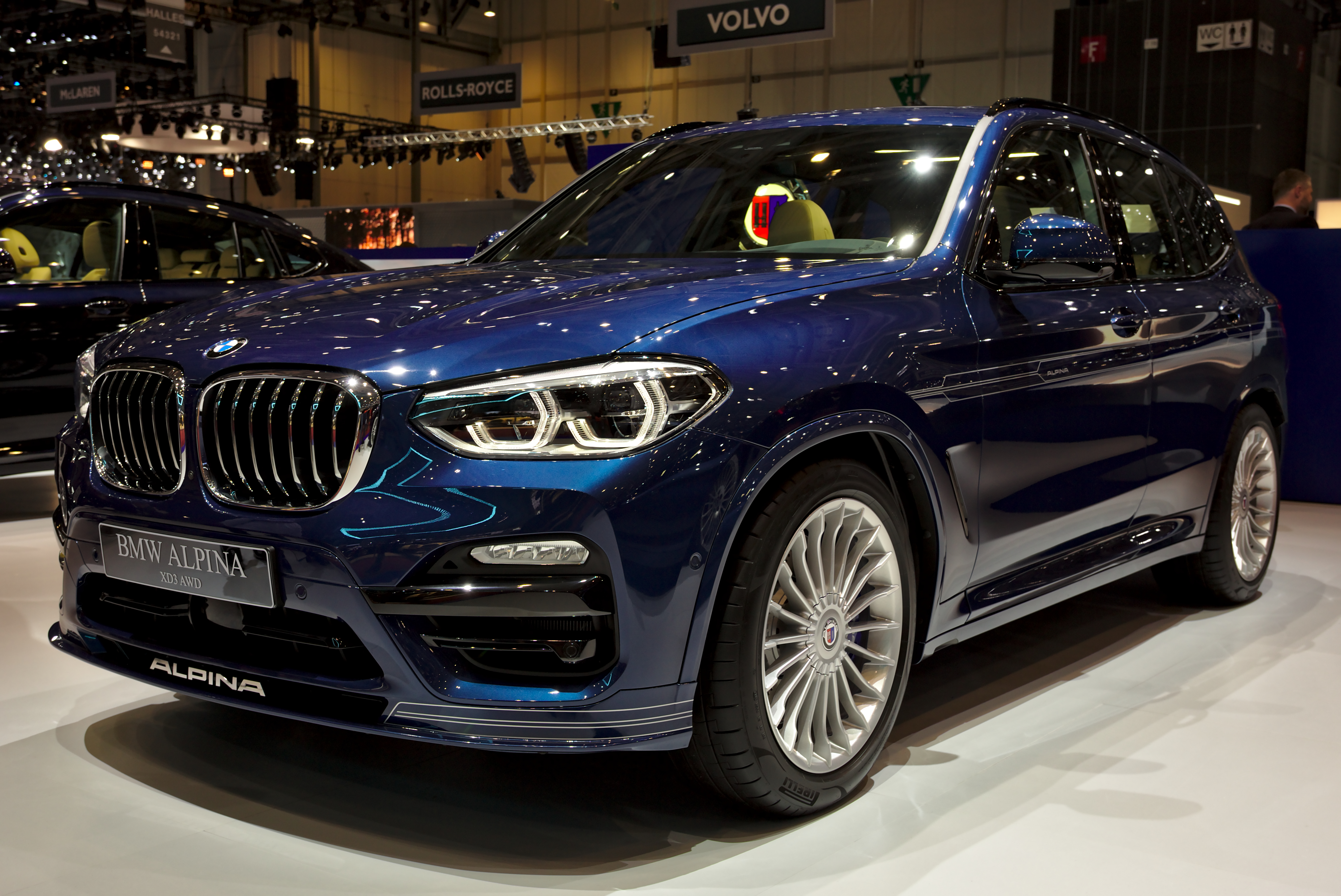
Alpina XD3 at the 2018 Geneva Motor Show

The Alpina XD3 made its debut at the 2018 Geneva Motor Show. The XD3 is fitted with an Alpina-modified version of BMW's B57 diesel inline-six engine. In the quad-turbo left-hand drive version, the engine outputs 388 PS (383 hp; 285 kW) and 770 N⋅m (568 lbf⋅ft), giving a 0–100 km/h (62 mph) time of 4.6 seconds and a top speed of 266 km/h (165 mph). In the bi-turbocharged right-hand drive version, the engine outputs 333 PS (328 hp; 245 kW) and 700 N⋅m (516 lbf⋅ft), giving it a 0–100 km/h (62 mph) time of 4.9 seconds and a top speed of 254 km/h (158 mph).

=== XD4 ===
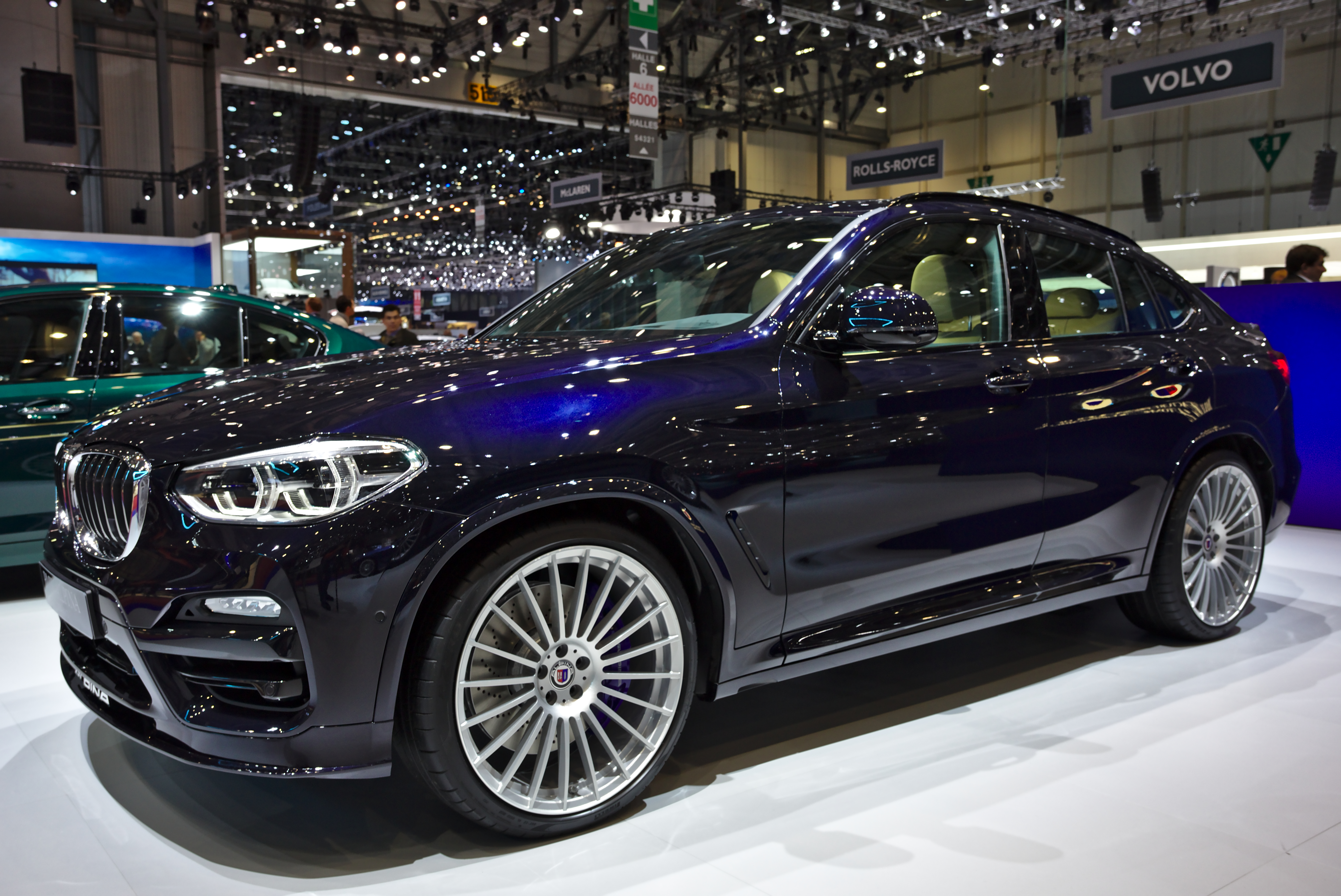
Alpina XD4

The Alpina XD4 debuted at the 2018 Geneva Motor Show. It is fitted with a modified version of the B57 diesel engine with four turbochargers, and outputs 285 kW (382 hp) and 770 N⋅m (570 lbf⋅ft). The XD4 is the fastest accelerating diesel-powered production SUV, and can accelerate from 0–100 km/h (62 mph) in 4.6 seconds, with a top speed of 268 km/h (167 mph). It is available in left-hand drive markets only.

== Alpina Roadster V8 ==
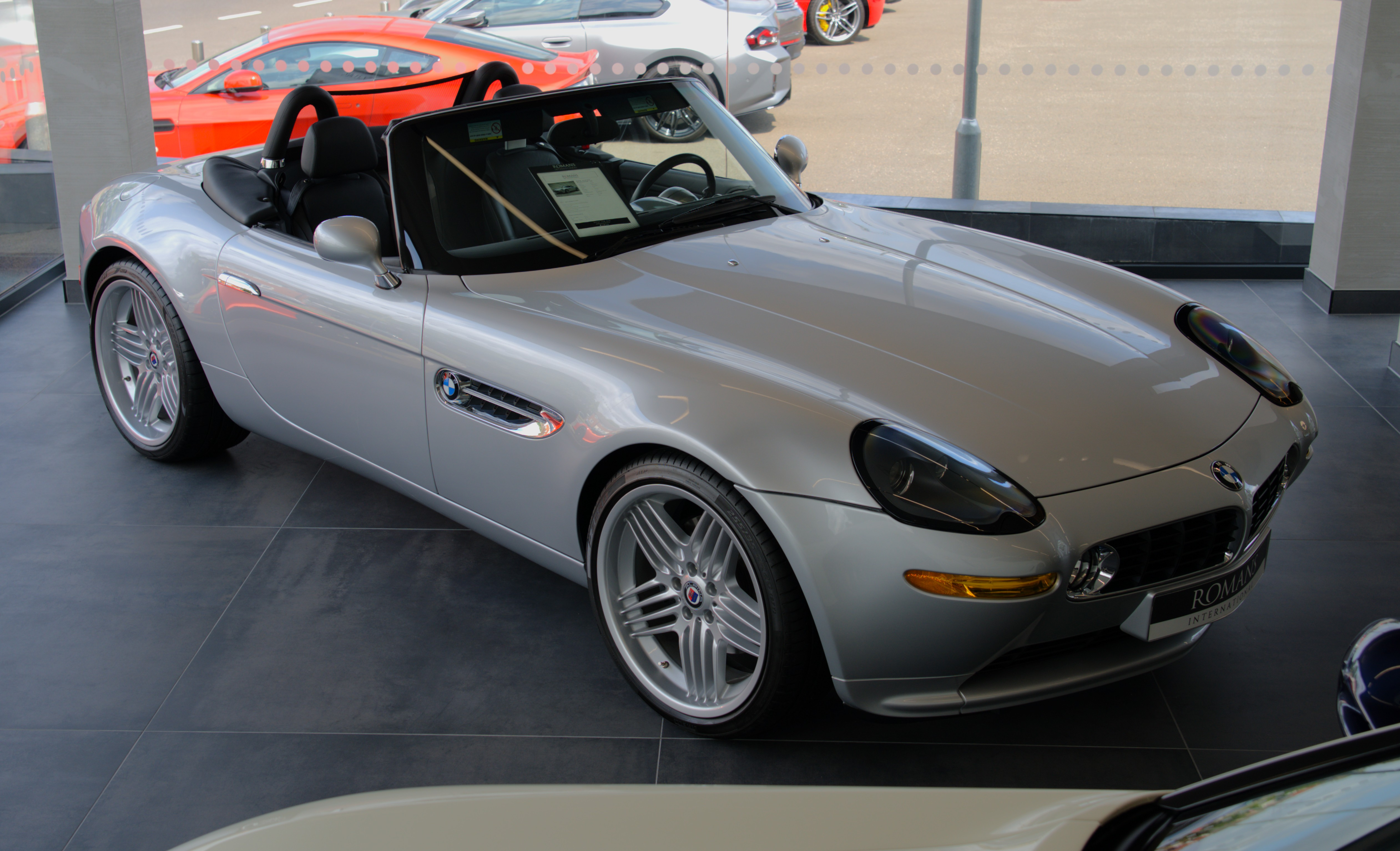
Alpina V8 Roadster

With production of the BMW Z8 completed by November 2002, for 2003 the Z8 production was replaced by the Alpina Roadster V8. The Alpina was a departure from the hard-edged sporting focus of the original car, and elements of the new grand touring intent were evident throughout this final edition.

Instead of the original six-speed manual and 4.9 L (S62) engine featured in Z8's, the Alpina came only as an automatic, using a five-speed BMW Steptronic transmission mated to a 4.8 L Alpina-tuned V8 motor from the Alpina E39 B10 V8 S (Alpina F5). In order to complete the car's transition from sports car to Alpina, relaxed suspension tuning was used. The standard Z8's run-flat tires on 18 in (46 cm) wheels were discarded in favor of conventional tires with softer sidewalls, on 20 in (51 cm) wheels.

A new, softer grade of Nappa leather replaced the Z8's less supple specification, and special Alpina gauges were featured on the dash cluster. An Alpina steering wheel with three solid spokes replaced the original, which could not be retrofitted with shift paddles for the automatic. Gear selection was displayed in an Alpina-specific display mounted in front of the wheel.

Performance of the Alpina V8 differed from that of the standard car in that peak power was reduced to 381 PS (280 kW) while peak torque was raised to 520 N⋅m (384 lb⋅ft); this torque was available at significantly lower rpm than the original in order to enable more relaxed cruising. Curiously, the electronically limited top speed was officially raised to 260 km/h (160 mph), rather than the 250 km/h (160 mph) that most cars are limited to.

Only 555 of these Alpinas were built, 450 of which were exported to the U.S. market and only eight to the UK. In the United States, this special edition of the Z8 was sold directly through BMW dealerships, marking a first for Alpina, whose cars had never been sold through retail channels in the U.S.

== Gallery ==
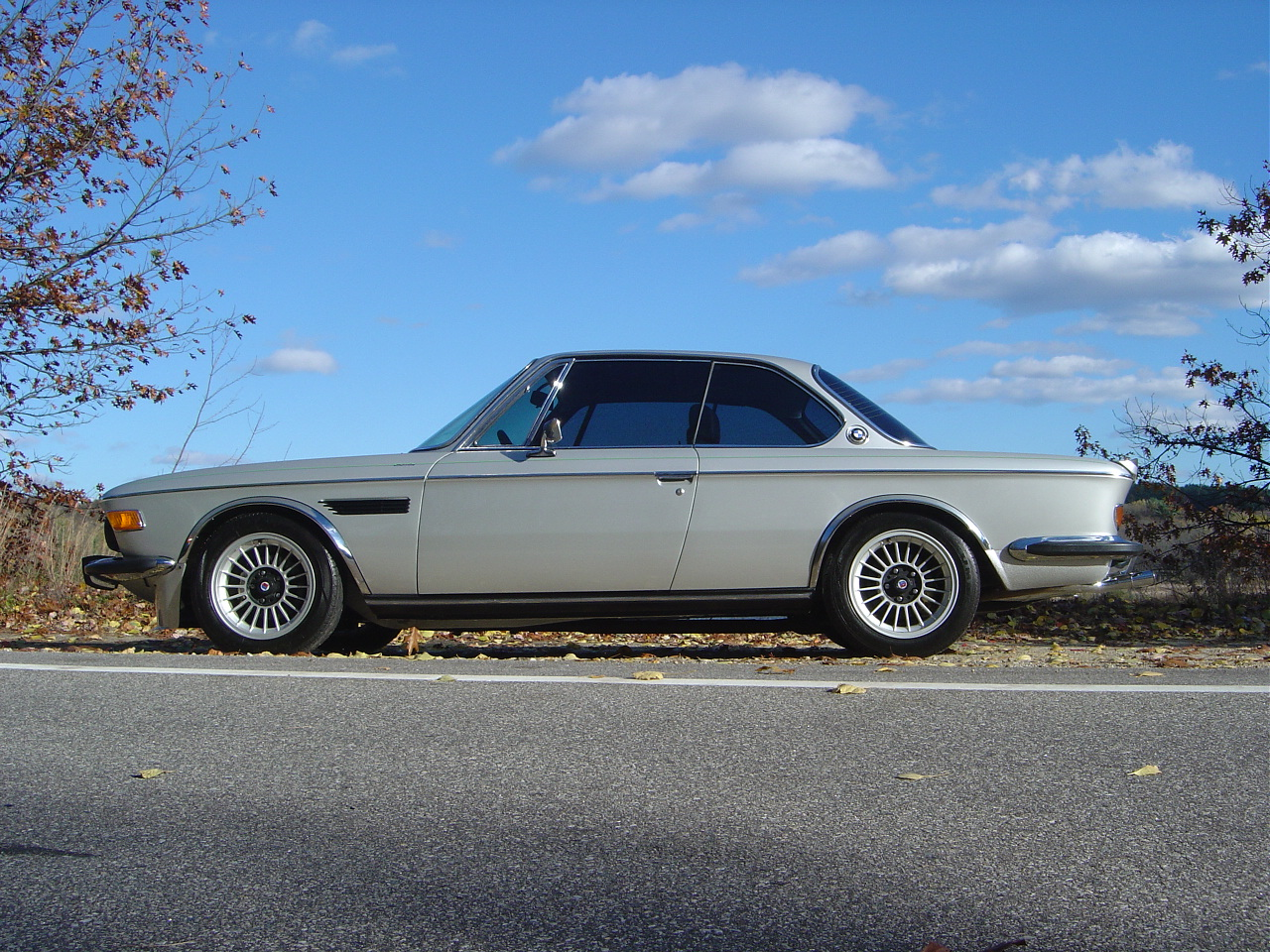
1974 BMW 3.0 CS 'Alpina' profile view

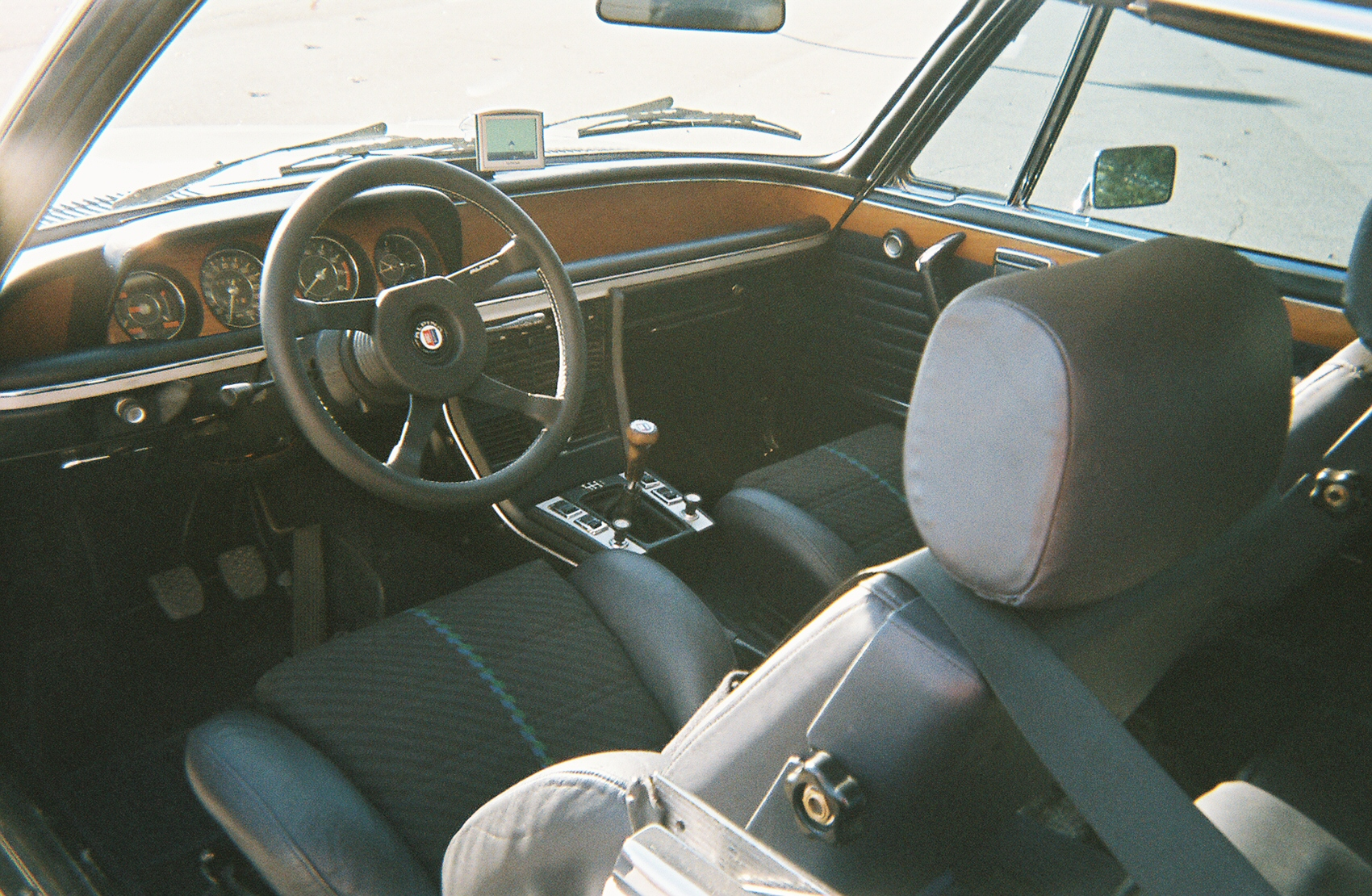
1974 BMW 3.0 CS 'Alpina' interior

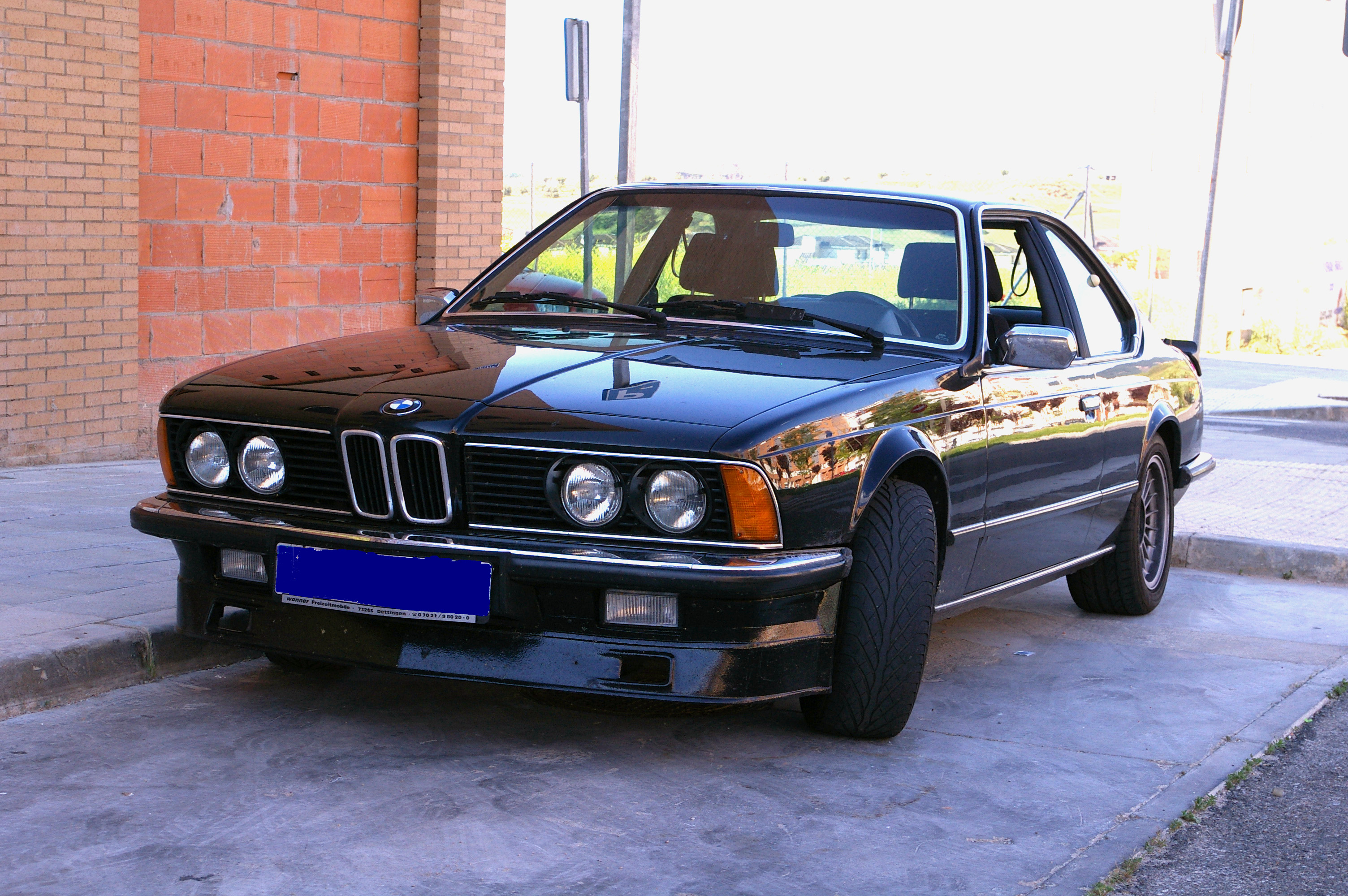
1984 BMW Alpina B7 Turbo Coupé / 1

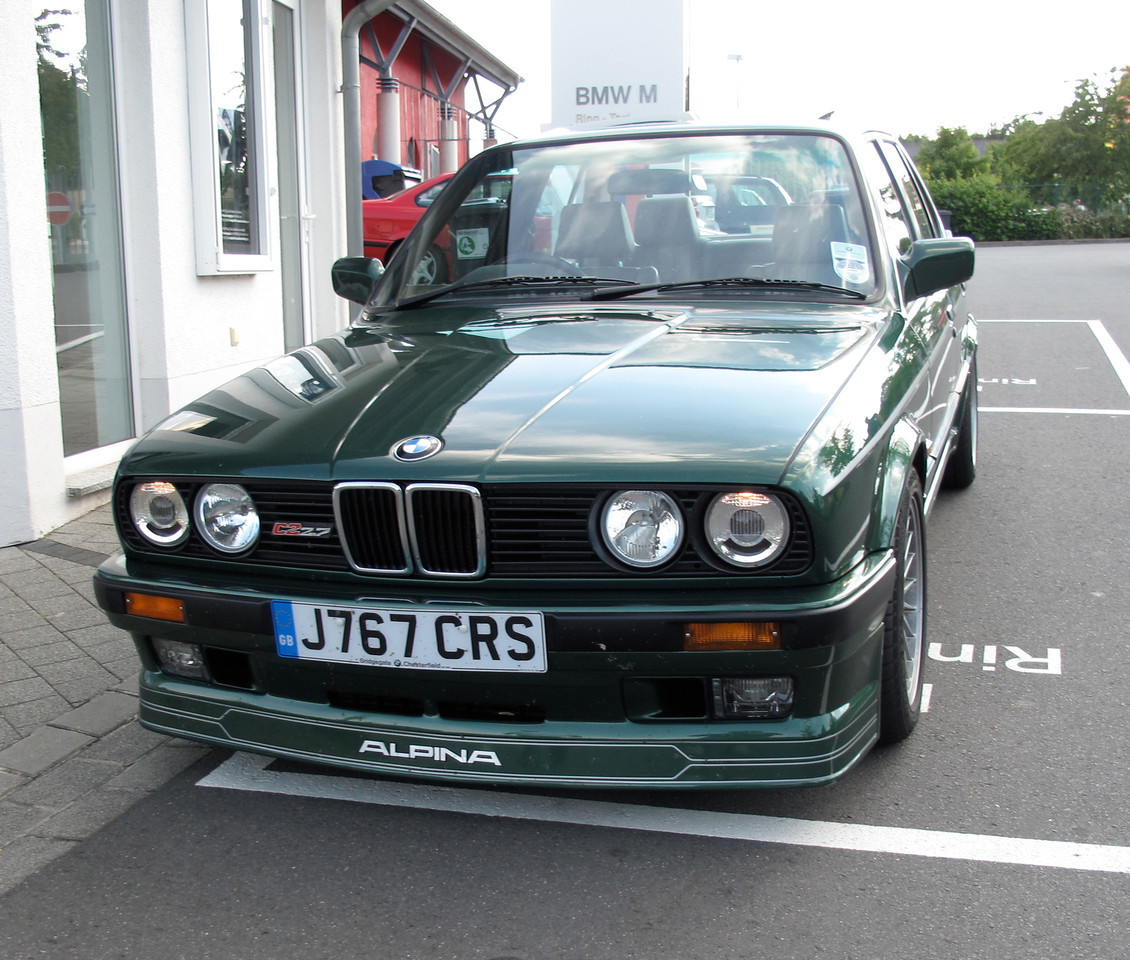
Alpina C2 2.7 Allrad

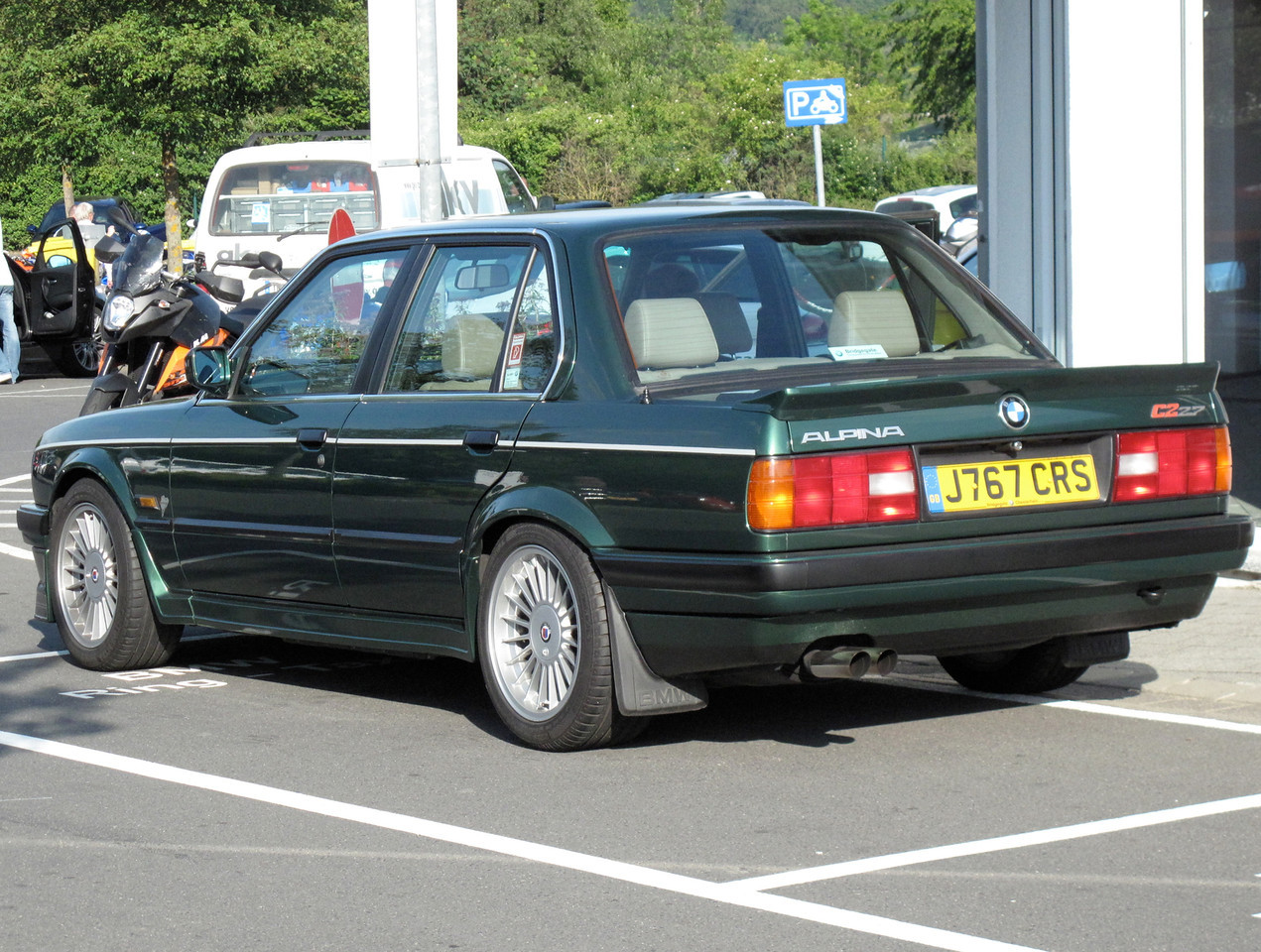
Alpina C2 2.7 Allrad

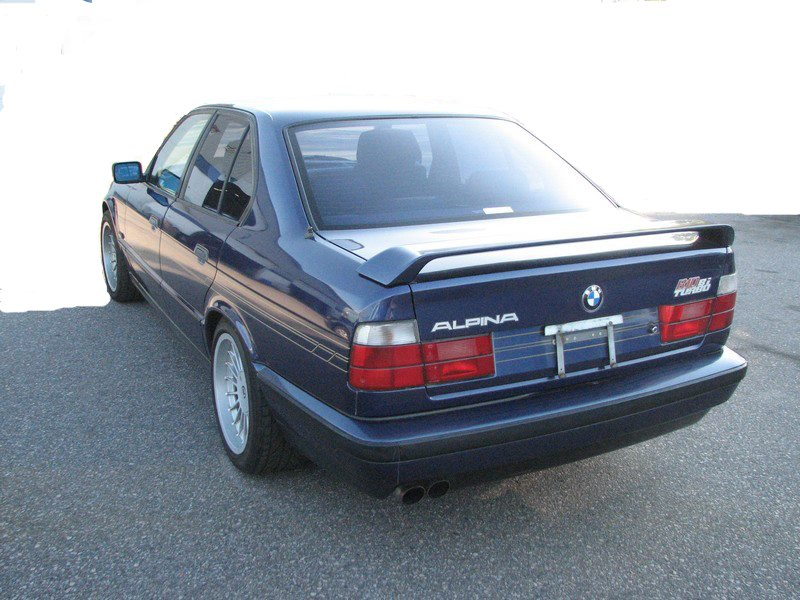
1992 Alpina B10 BiTurbo

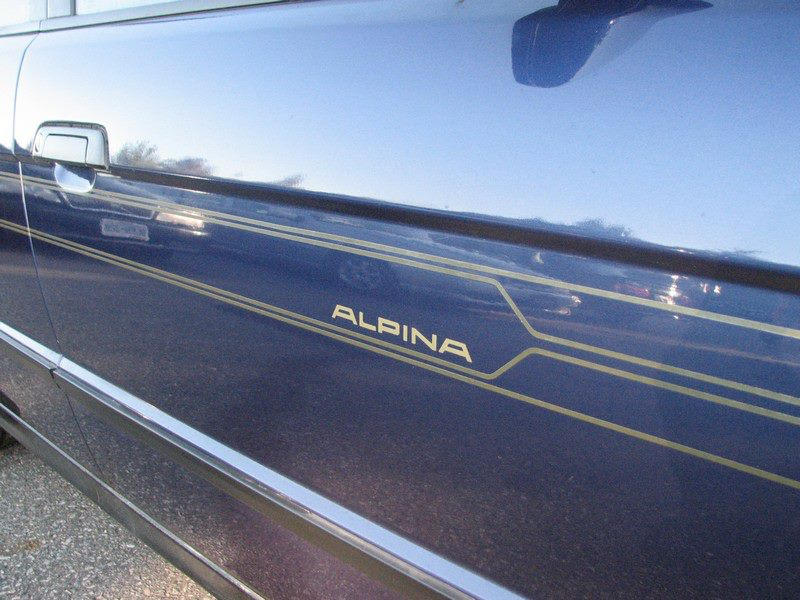
Alpina Deco stripe

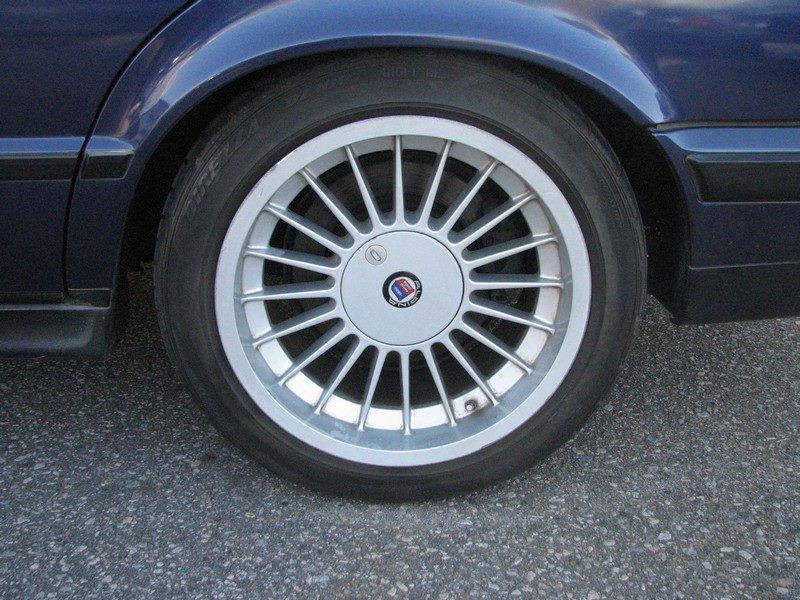
Alpina wheel

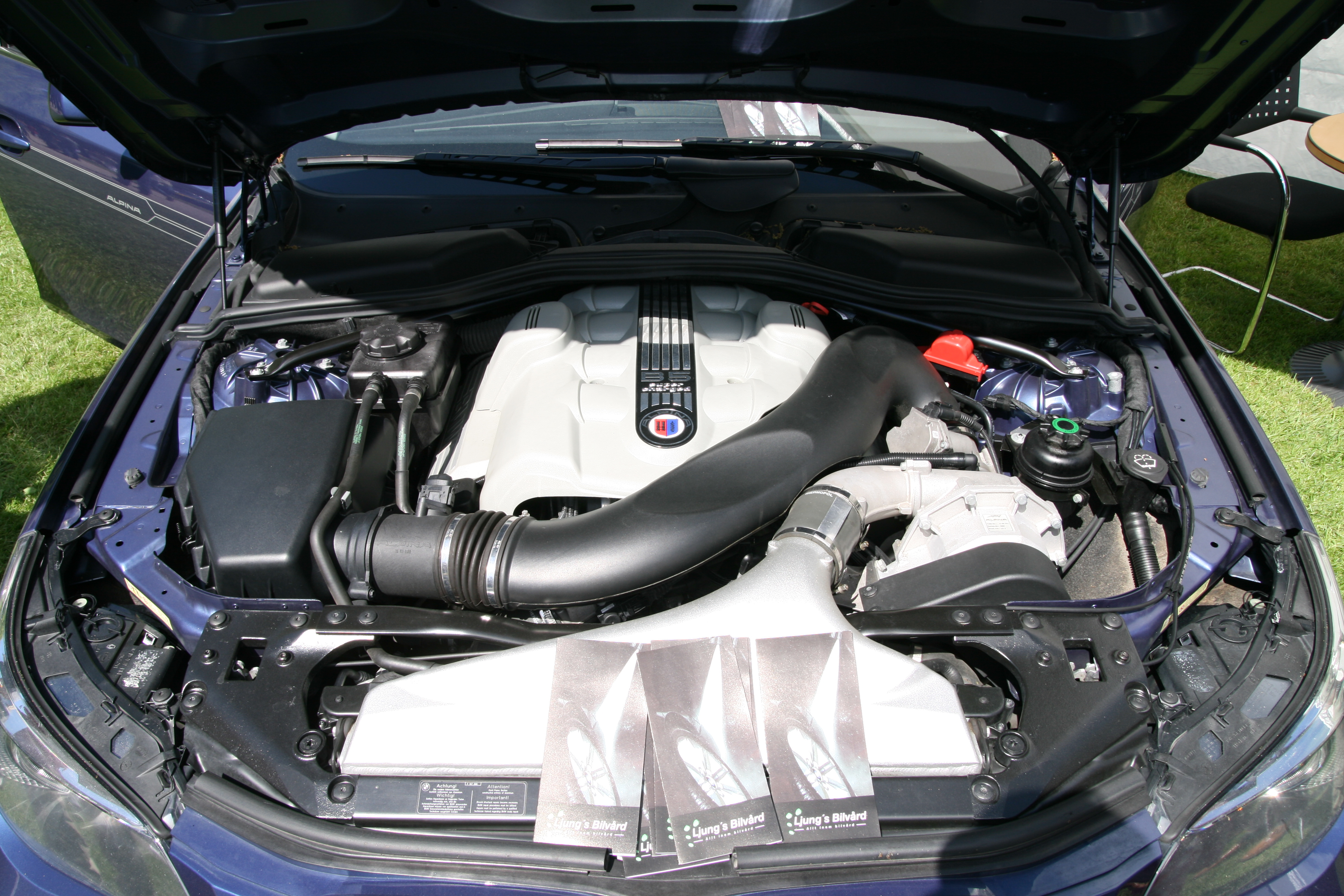
Alpina B5 (2005) engine bay

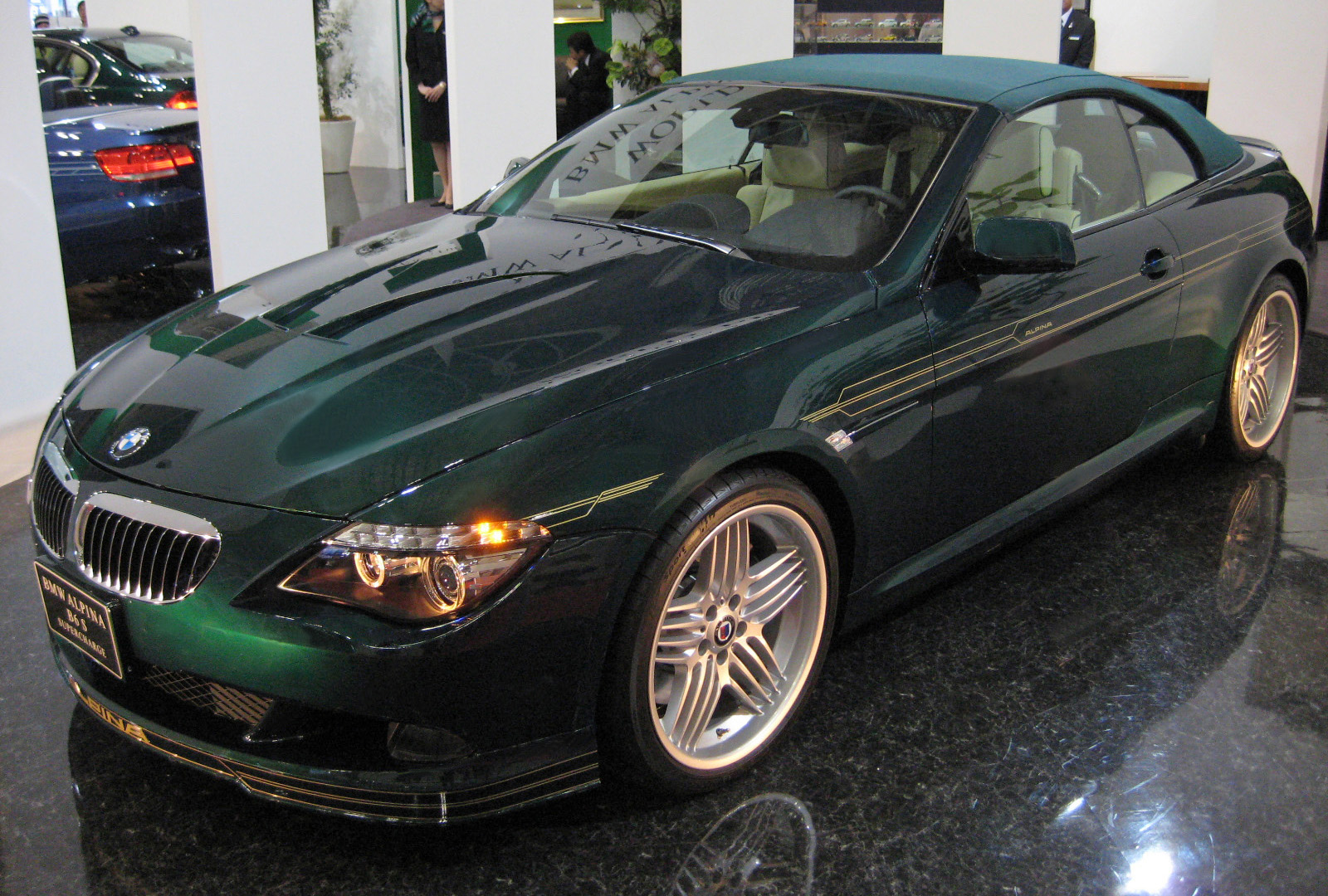
Alpina B6 S

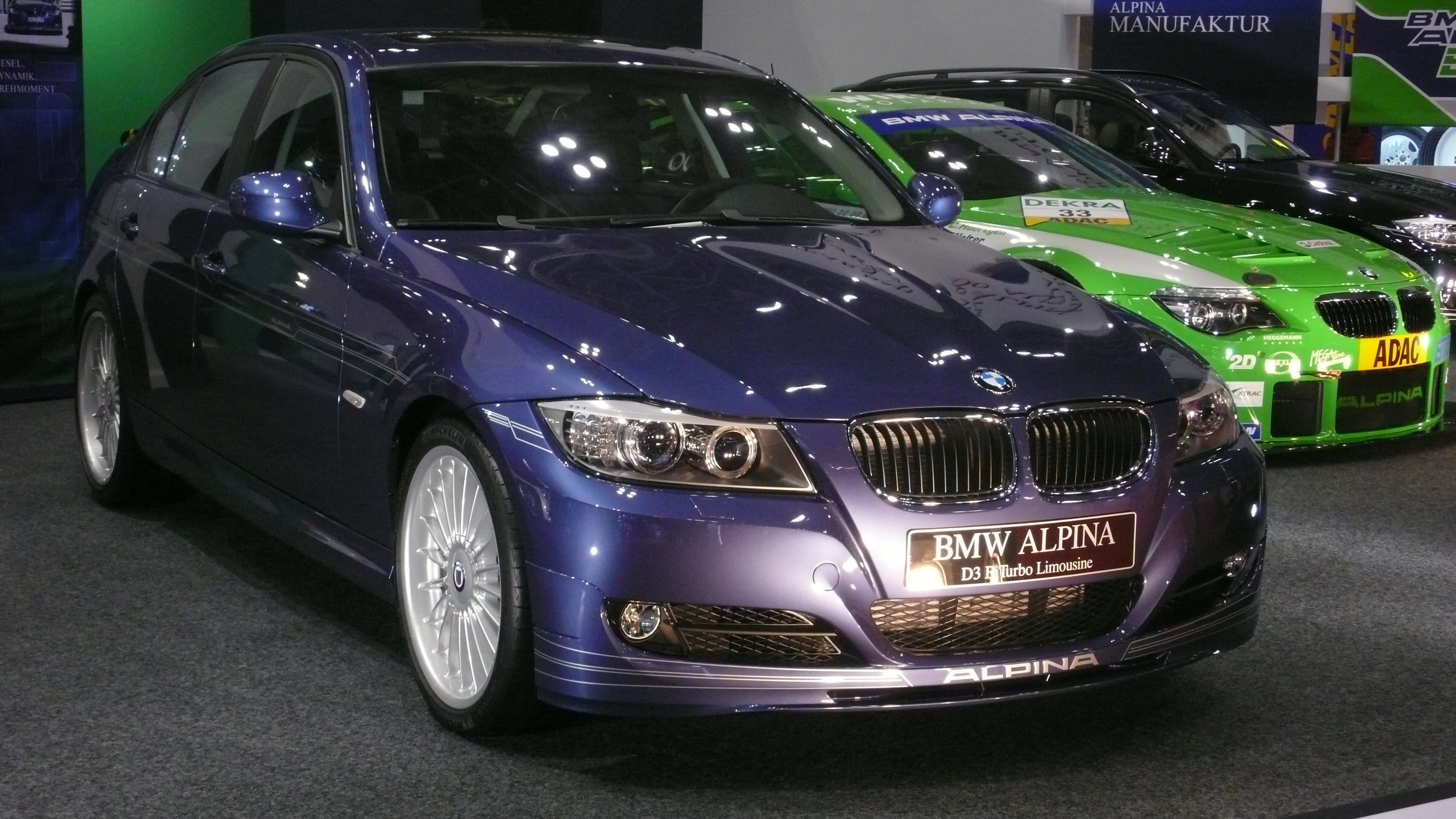
Alpina D3 Bi-Turbo

== See also ==
- ABT, similar marque specializing on high-performance Audi models.
- Brabus, similar marque specializing on high-performance Mercedes-Benz models.
- Lister, similar marque specializing on high-performance Jaguar models.
