= BMW 5 Series (E28) =

Overview
- Manufacturer: BMW
- Model code: E28
- Production: 1981–1987
- Model years: 1982–1987
- Assembly: West Germany: Dingolfing; South Africa: Rosslyn (BMW SA)
- Designer: Claus Luthe

Body and chassis
- Class: Executive car (E)
- Body style: 4-door saloon
- Layout: FR layout
- Related: BMW M5 (E28); BMW 6 Series (E24)

Powertrain
- Engine: Petrol: 1.8 L M10 I4; 2.0-3.4 L M20/M30 I6; 3.5 L M88/S38 DOHC I6; Diesel: 2.4 L M21 I6

Dimensions
- Wheelbase: 2,625 mm (103.3 in)
- Length: 4,620 mm (181.9 in)
- Width: 1,700 mm (66.9 in)
- Height: 1,415 mm (55.7 in)

Chronology
- Predecessor: BMW 5 Series (E12)
- Successor: BMW 5 Series (E34)

The BMW E28 is the second generation of BMW 5 Series executive cars, which was produced from 1981 to 1987 and replaced the E12 5 Series. Pre-series production began in April 1981 and the car was introduced in the autumn that year.

The E28 was initially produced with straight-four and straight-six petrol engines until 1983, when the 524td model became the first BMW car to be powered by a diesel engine. It was also the first 5 Series with the centre console angled towards the driver and to be available with anti-lock brakes (ABS).

The first BMW M5 was produced during the E28 generation. It was powered by the M88/3 and S38 straight-six engines. The E24 6 Series coupés were built on the E28 platform from 1982 to 1989.

The E28 was replaced by the E34 5 Series in 1988.

== Body and interior ==
The E28 has a self-supporting body that is welded to the body platform. The passenger cell is a safety passenger cell with deformation elements both in the front and rear of the vehicle. Unlike its E12 predecessor and E34 successor, the E28 has a rear-hinged bonnet. The boot has a volume of 460 L (122 US gal). Most models have a fuel tank capacity of 70 L (18 US gal), with some models having a smaller tank of 63 litres (17 US gal). The kerb weight is 1,140–1,410 kg (2,513–3,109 lb).

Cruise control, an on-board computer (to display trip information), and a "check control" panel (to alert the driver about fluid levels and lighting faults) were introduced to the 5 Series on the E28. The glazing is made of single-pane safety glass, the windscreen has laminated glass. As part of developing the air-conditioning system for the E28, several of the BMW engineers in charge of this program drove a previous generation E12 5 Series during the middle of summer in Texas. The E12 528i was painted black with a black interior, and driven 500 mi (805 km) in one day.

The styling was developed under BMW's chief designer Claus Luthe, with development of the E28 beginning in 1975. At the time that BMW was designing the E28, the company had only one computer, which was used for payroll management and spare parts logistics. Wolfgang Matschinsky and his team borrowed that computer to perform the calculations necessary to develop the new drivetrain and chassis. This was due to the fact that the addition of an ABS system necessitated a redesign from the previous model due to excessive vibrations under heavy braking.

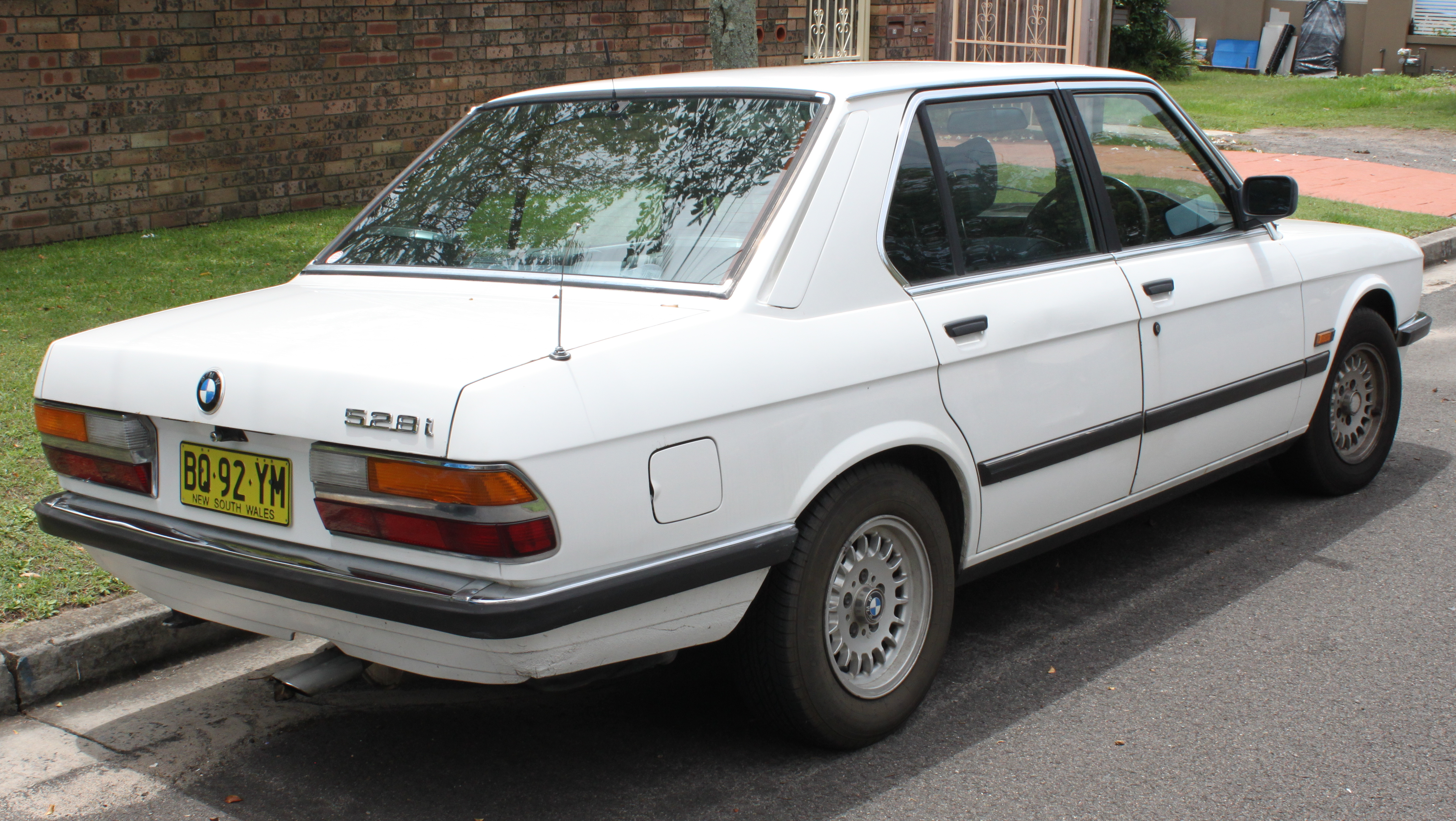
Rear view

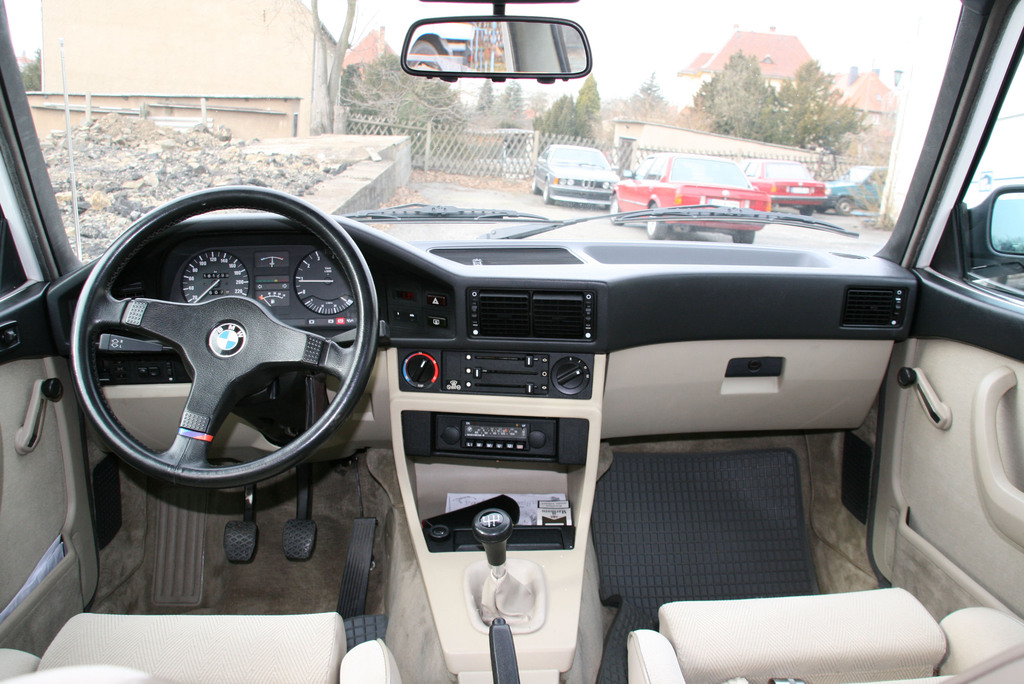
Interior

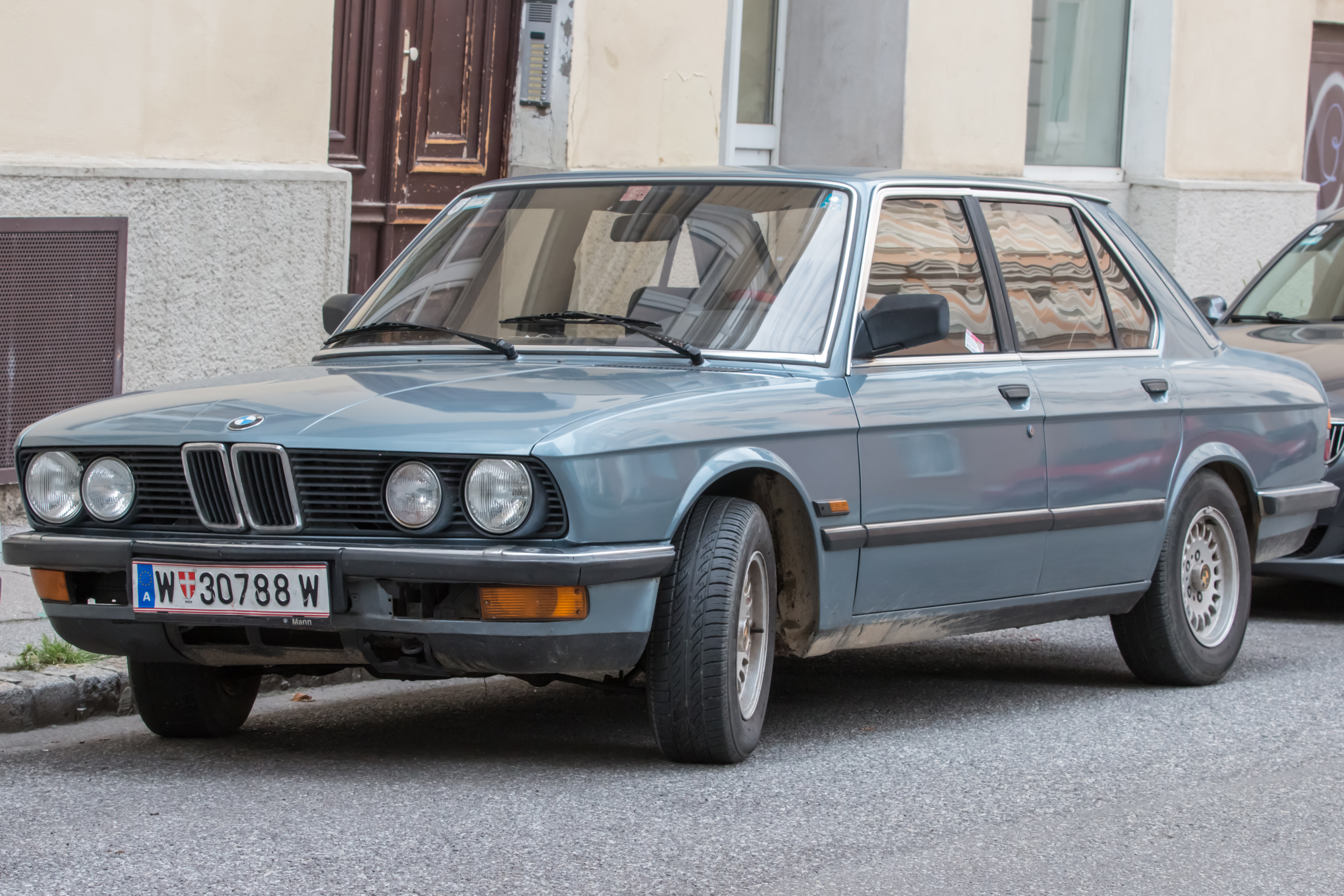
Front/side view

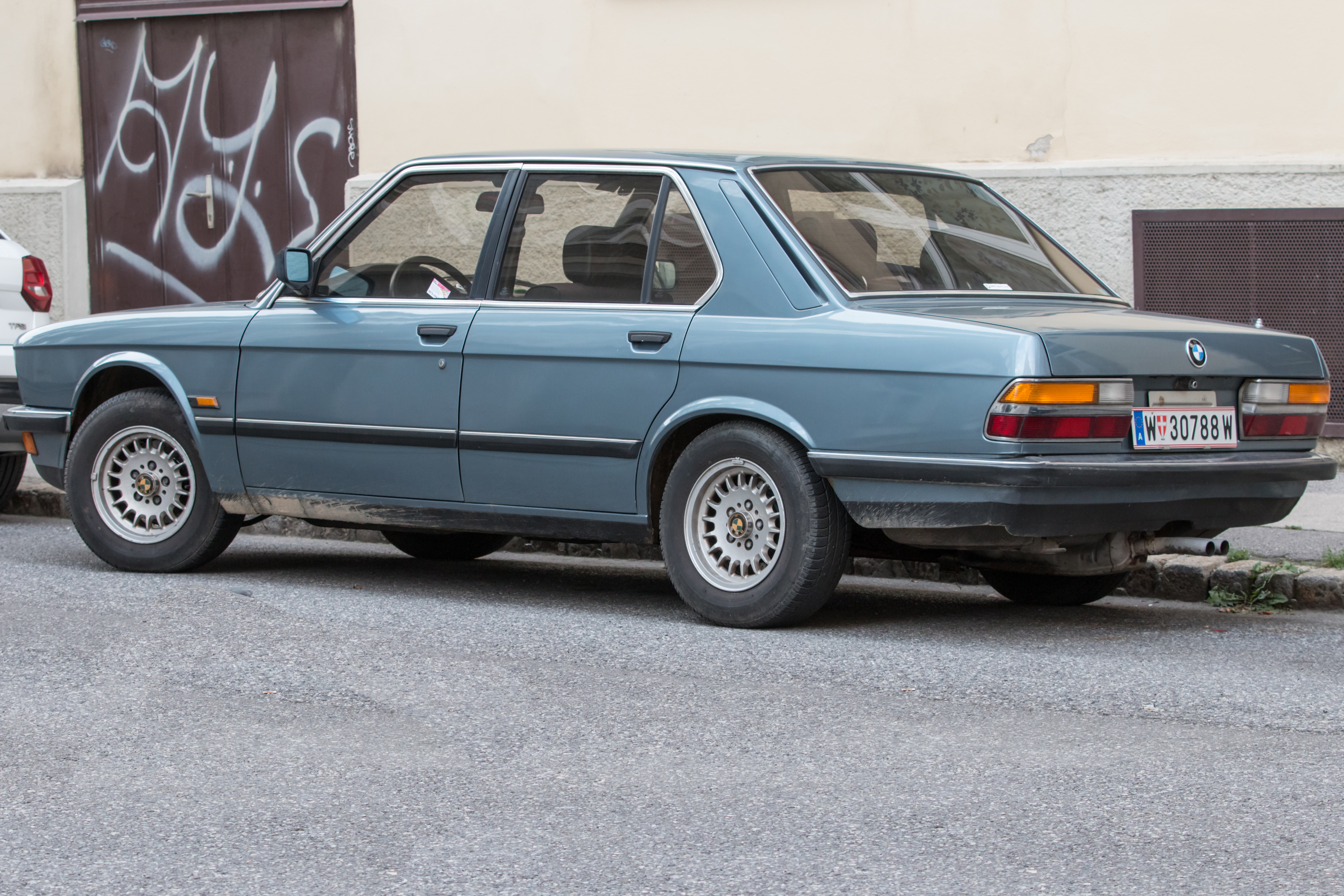
Rear/side view

== Engines ==
The E28 was the first 5 Series produced with diesel engines (the 524d and 524td models) and with a petrol engined model specifically aimed at increased fuel economy (525e/528e model).

The four models available at the launch of the E28 were the 518, 520i, 525i and 528i, with the 518 using a straight-four petrol engine and the other three models using a straight-six petrol engine. Over the course of the E28 model, the following models were added: the 524d and 524td using diesel engines, the 518i (a fuel-injected version of the 518), the 525e/528e as fuel-economy models, and the upper-specification 533i, 535i, M535i, and M5 models.

A liquid petroleum gas (LPG) option was introduced for some petrol engines in 1984.

=== Petrol ===
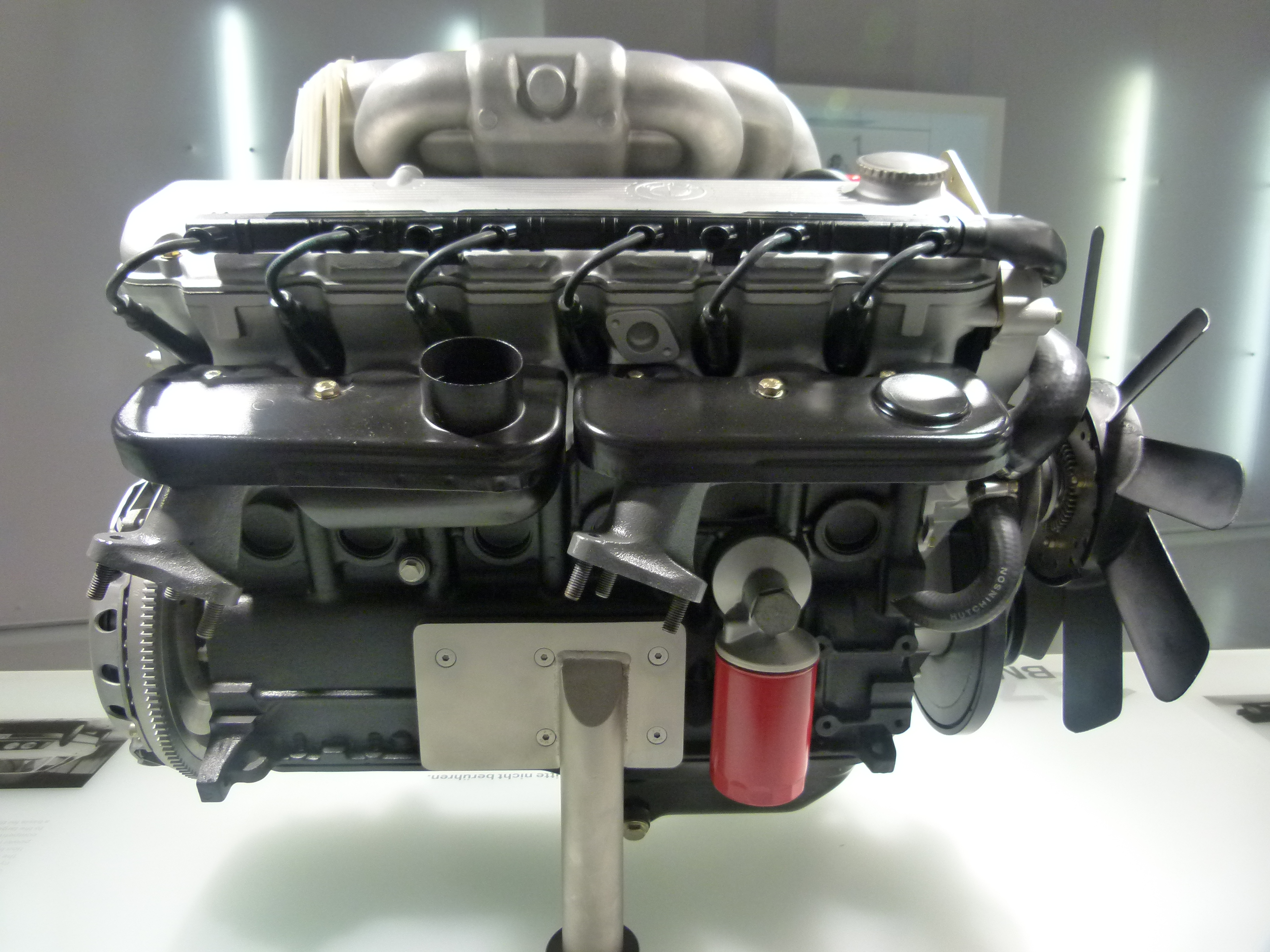
BMW M20 straight-six engine

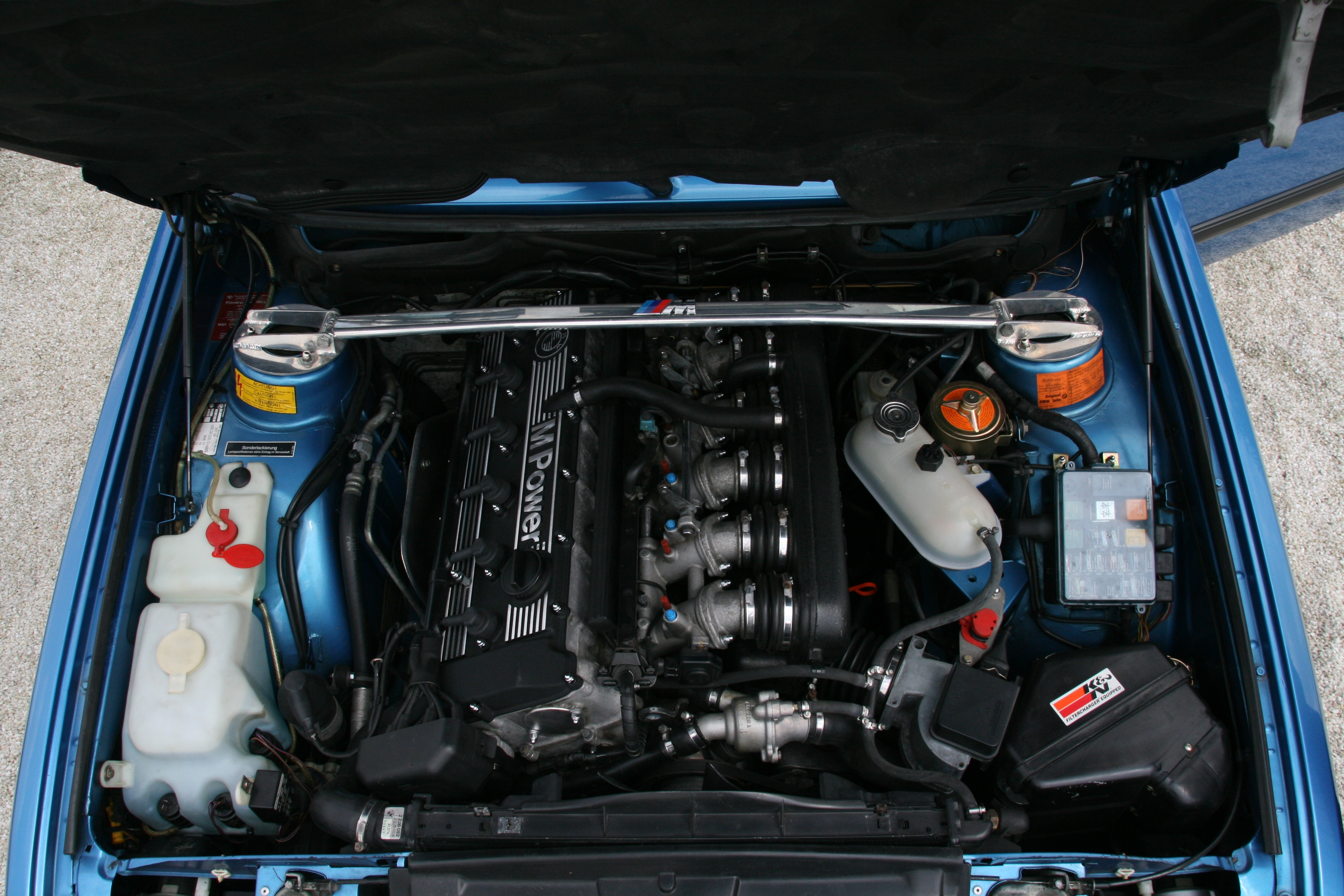
BMW M88/3 straight-six engine

Model	Engine	Power	Torque	Fuel supply	Years
518	1.8 L (1,766 cc); M10B18 I4	66 kW (90 PS) at 5500 rpm	140 N⋅m (103 lb⋅ft) at 4000 rpm	Pierburg 2BE carburettor	1981–1984
518i	1.8 L (1,766 cc); M10B18 I4	77 kW (105 PS) at 5800 rpm	145 N⋅m (107 lb⋅ft) at 4500 rpm	L-Jetronic	1981–1987
520i	2.0 L (1,991 cc); M20B20 I6	92 kW (125 PS) at 5800 rpm	165 N⋅m (122 lb⋅ft) at 4500 rpm	K-Jetronic	1981–1982
520i	2.0 L (1,991 cc); M20B20 I6	92 kW (125 PS) at 5800 rpm	170 N⋅m (125 lb⋅ft) at 4000 rpm	L-Jetronic	1982–1987
520i	2.0 L (1,991 cc); M20B20 I6	95 kW (129 PS) at 6000 rpm	174 N⋅m (128 lb⋅ft) at 4000 rpm	LE-Jetronic	1985–1988
520i	2.0 L (1,991 cc); M20B20 I6	95 kW (129 PS) at 6000 rpm	164 N⋅m (121 lb⋅ft) at 4300 rpm	Motronic	1986–1988
525i	2.5 L (2,494 cc); M30B25 I6	110 kW (150 PS) at 5500 rpm	215 N⋅m (159 lb⋅ft) at 4000 rpm	L-Jetronic	1981–1987
525e, 528e	2.7 L (2,693 cc); M20B27 I6	92 kW (125 PS) at 4250 rpm	240 N⋅m (177 lb⋅ft) at 3250 rpm	Motronic	1982–1987
525e, 528e	2.7 L (2,693 cc); M20B27 I6	90 kW (122 PS) at 4250 rpm	230 N⋅m (170 lb⋅ft) at 3250 rpm	L-Jetronic, Motronic	1982–1987
525e, 528e	2.7 L (2,693 cc); M20B27 I6	95 kW (129 PS) at 4250 rpm	240 N⋅m (177 lb⋅ft) at 3250 rpm	Motronic	1984–1988
525e, 528e	2.7 L (2,693 cc); M20B27 I6	88 kW (120 PS) at 4250 rpm	240 N⋅m (177 lb⋅ft) at 3250 rpm	Motronic	1985–1987
528i	2.8 L (2,788 cc); M30 I6	135 kW (184 PS) at 5800 rpm	240 N⋅m (177 lb⋅ft) at 4200 rpm	L-Jetronic	1981–1987
533i	3.2 L (3,210 cc); M30 I6	135 kW (184 PS) at 6000 rpm	265 N⋅m (195 lb⋅ft) at 4000 rpm	Motronic	1982–1984
535i, M535i	3.4 L (3,430 cc); M30 I6	160 kW (218 PS) at 5500 rpm	310 N⋅m (229 lb⋅ft) at 4000 rpm	Motronic	1985–1988
535i, M535i	3.4 L (3,430 cc); M30 I6	136 kW (182 hp) at 5400 rpm	290 N⋅m (214 lb⋅ft) at 4000 rpm	Motronic	1985–1988 (US)
M5	3.5 L (3,453 cc); M88/3 I6	210 kW (286 PS) at 6500 rpm	340 N⋅m (251 lb⋅ft) at 4500 rpm	Motronic	1985–1988
M5	3.5 L (3,453 cc); S38 I6	191 kW (256 hp) at 6500 rpm	330 N⋅m (243 lb⋅ft) at 4500 rpm	Motronic	1986–1988 (US)

518: Sold only in some European markets where it suited local tax categories, the 518 was the lowest specification model which used a four-cylinder engine with a carburetor. Factory performance figures for the manual transmission cars are a top speed of 164 km/h (102 mph) and 0–100 km/h acceleration in 14.0 seconds.

518i: The base model in Japan and some European countries, the 518i used a fuel-injected four-cylinder engine. Factory performance figures for the manual transmission cars are a top speed of 175 km/h (109 mph) and 0–100 km/h acceleration in 12.6 seconds. This version was not sold in West Germany until the 1984 facelift, when it replaced the carburetted 518.

520i: A mid-range model with the smallest of the available six-cylinder engines. Factory performance figures for the manual transmission cars are a top speed of 190 km/h (118 mph) and 0–100 km/h acceleration in 11.4 seconds.

525e / 528e: The 525e (called 528e in North America and Japan) uses a longer stroke 2.7-litre version of the 6-cylinder M20 petrol engine, is optimised for fuel economy and torque at low engine speed rather than the traditional high revving characteristics of BMW straight-six engines. The "e" stands for the Greek letter eta, for economy. According to BMW, the 525e is more fuel efficient than the 520i, which has the same rated power of 92 kW. Since many markets tax cars based on engine displacement, the eta's larger engine meant that it was not suitable everywhere. The model was expressly developed with the American market in mind. BMW's corporate average fuel economy was at risk of not meeting requirements by 1984, primarily due to higher sales of their bigger, more expensive cars in the early 1980s. In Austria, the 525e was detuned to 88 kW (118 hp).

Factory performance figures for the manual transmission cars without a catalytic converter are a top speed of 190 km/h (118 mph) and 0–100 km/h acceleration in 10.7 seconds. With a catalytic converter, the figures are a top speed of 188 km/h (117 mph) and 0–100 km/h acceleration in 11.3 seconds

525i: This mid-range model is powered by a 2.5-litre 6-cylinder engine. The 525i was only sold in Europe. Factory performance figures for the manual transmission cars are a top speed of 201 km/h (125 mph) and 0–100 km/h acceleration in 9.8 seconds.

528i: Initially the highest specification available, the 6-cylinder 528i became a mid-range model following the release of the 533i and 535i models. Factory performance figures for the manual transmission cars are a top speed of 215 km/h (134 mph) and 0–100 km/h acceleration in 8.4 seconds.

533i: Only sold in Japan and North America, the 6-cylinder 533i was the highest specification model during its production years of 1983–1984. It was replaced by the 535i.

535i/is: Released in 1984, the 535i replaced the 533i and uses the same 6-cylinder drivetrain as the M535i. In the US there was also a 535is model, which included sport seats and spoilers at the front and rear. Factory performance figures for the manual transmission cars without a catalytic converter are a top speed of 225 km/h (140 mph) and 0–100 km/h acceleration in 7.2 seconds. With a catalytic converter, the figures are a top speed of 212 km/h (132 mph) and 0–100 km/h acceleration in 7.9 seconds

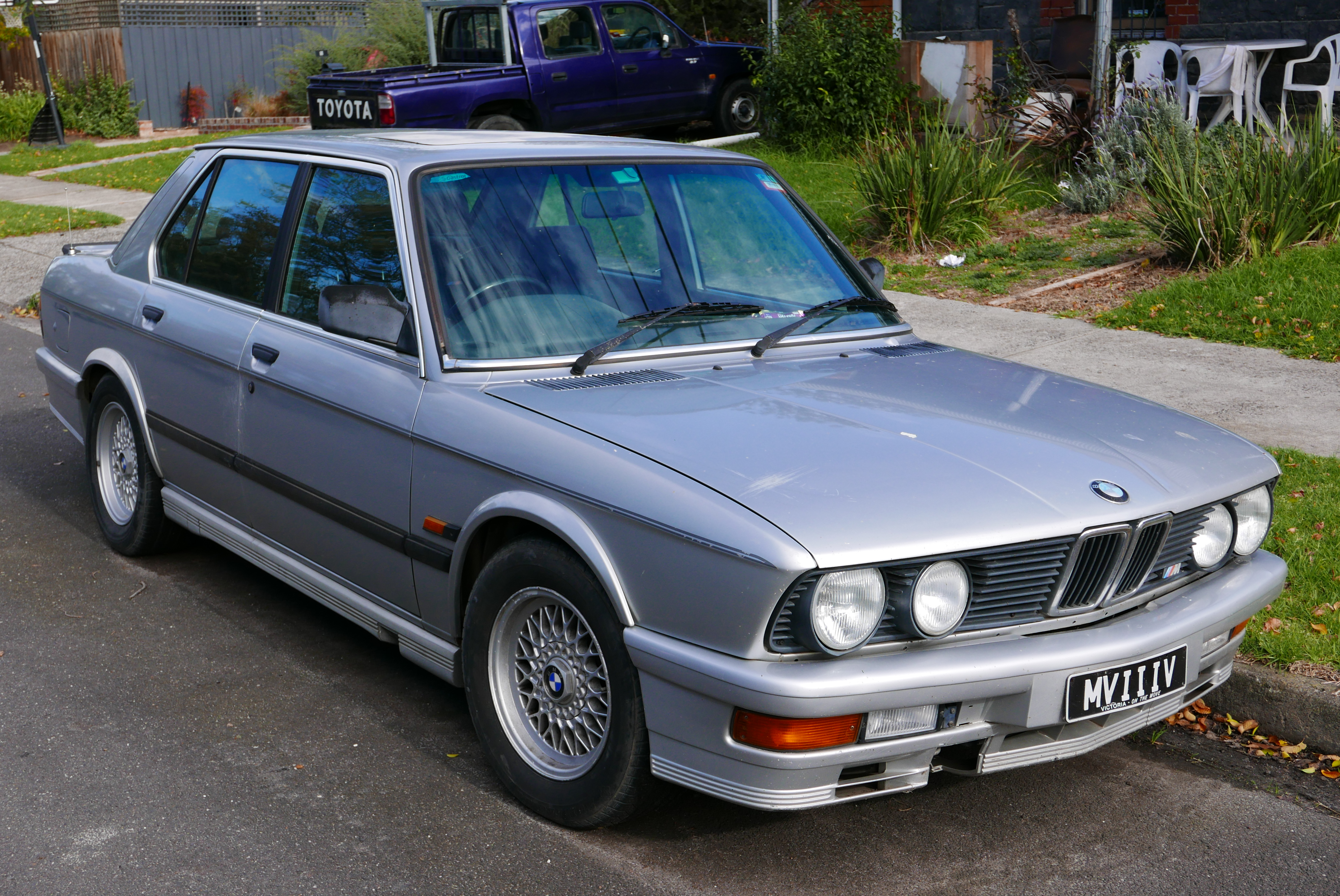
M535i

M535i: The top of the regular production model range, the M535i uses the drivetrain from the 535i plus M-Technic suspension, and wheels and body panels not found on any other E28. The M535i was assembled on the standard E28 assembly lines in Dingolfing and Rosslyn. Factory performance figures for the manual transmission cars without a catalytic converter are a top speed of 230 km/h (143 mph) and 0–100 km/h acceleration in 7.2 seconds. With a catalytic converter, the figures are a top speed of 217 km/h (135 mph) and 0–100 km/h acceleration in 7.9 seconds

=== Diesel ===
Model	Engine	Power	Torque	Aspiration	Years
524d	2.4 L M21 straight-6	63 kW (86 PS) at 4600 rpm	152 N⋅m (112 lb⋅ft) at 2500 rpm	naturally aspirated	1986–1987
524td	2.4 L M21 straight-6	85 kW (115 PS) at 4800 rpm	210 N⋅m (155 lb⋅ft) at 2400 rpm	turbocharged	1983–1988

524d: At the 1986 Geneva Motor Show, four years after the introduction of the more powerful 524td model, the naturally-aspirated 524d model was introduced. 4,239 examples were built; this was only sold in some markets.

524td: This turbodiesel model was the first diesel car produced by BMW. It entered production in late 1982, when 100 pre-series cars were built. Factory performance figures for the manual transmission cars are a top speed of 180 km/h (112 mph) and 0–100 km/h acceleration in 12.9 seconds.

== Drivetrain ==
BMW offered the E28 with both manual and automatic gearboxes. The torque is transmitted from the engine with a single-disc dry clutch with a torsional damper in the models with a manual gearbox, the automatic models have a torque converter with built in lockup-clutch.

Manual transmissions

The 4-speed manual transmissions are:

- Getrag 242 (for M10 and M20 engine models)
- Getrag 262 (M30 engines)

The 5-speed manual transmissions are:

- Getrag 240 (M10 and M21 engines)
- Getrag 245 (M10 engines)
- Getrag 260 (M20, M21 and M30 engines)
- Getrag 265 (M30 engines and 525e/528e)
- Getrag 280 (M88/3 and S38 engines)
- ZF S5-16 (M20 engines)

Automatic transmissions

The 3-speed automatic transmissions are:

- ZF 3HP22 (M20 and M30 engines, US market only)

The 4-speed automatic transmissions are:

- ZF 4HP22 (M10, M20, M21)
- ZF 4HP22 EH (M20, M30)

== Suspension ==
Independent front and rear suspension is used, with Macpherson struts at the front and a semi-trailing arm design for the rear.

The front suspension was upgraded to use dual links at the bottom of the strut, as first seen on the E23 7 Series. This increases steering offset while cornering, to improve steering feel. Double-acting shock absorbers, coil springs and a front anti-roll bar are used.

The rear suspension is mounted on a delta beam that is connected to the body with three screws in rubber bearings, that have longitudinal play. Some models have a rear anti-roll bar.

The steering on most models is a speed-dependent recirculating ball power steering system made by ZF Friedrichshafen. The 518i has a Gemmer steering system with a double enveloping worm gear, also made by ZF.

Wheel sizes are 14-inch (16-inch for the M5 model) or 390 mm Michelin TRX. All rims have 22 mm positive rim offset.

== Brakes ==
The brakes use a hydraulic dual-circuit brake system with power assistance. The front wheels have disc brakes, that are – except for the 518i – internally ventilated. All models with 2.5 L or more displacement have rear disc brakes (non-vented), while the lesser powered models have rear drum brakes. To prevent the wheels from locking, BMW equipped the E28 after 1984 with an anti-lock braking system, although it was an option in some markets.

== M5 model ==
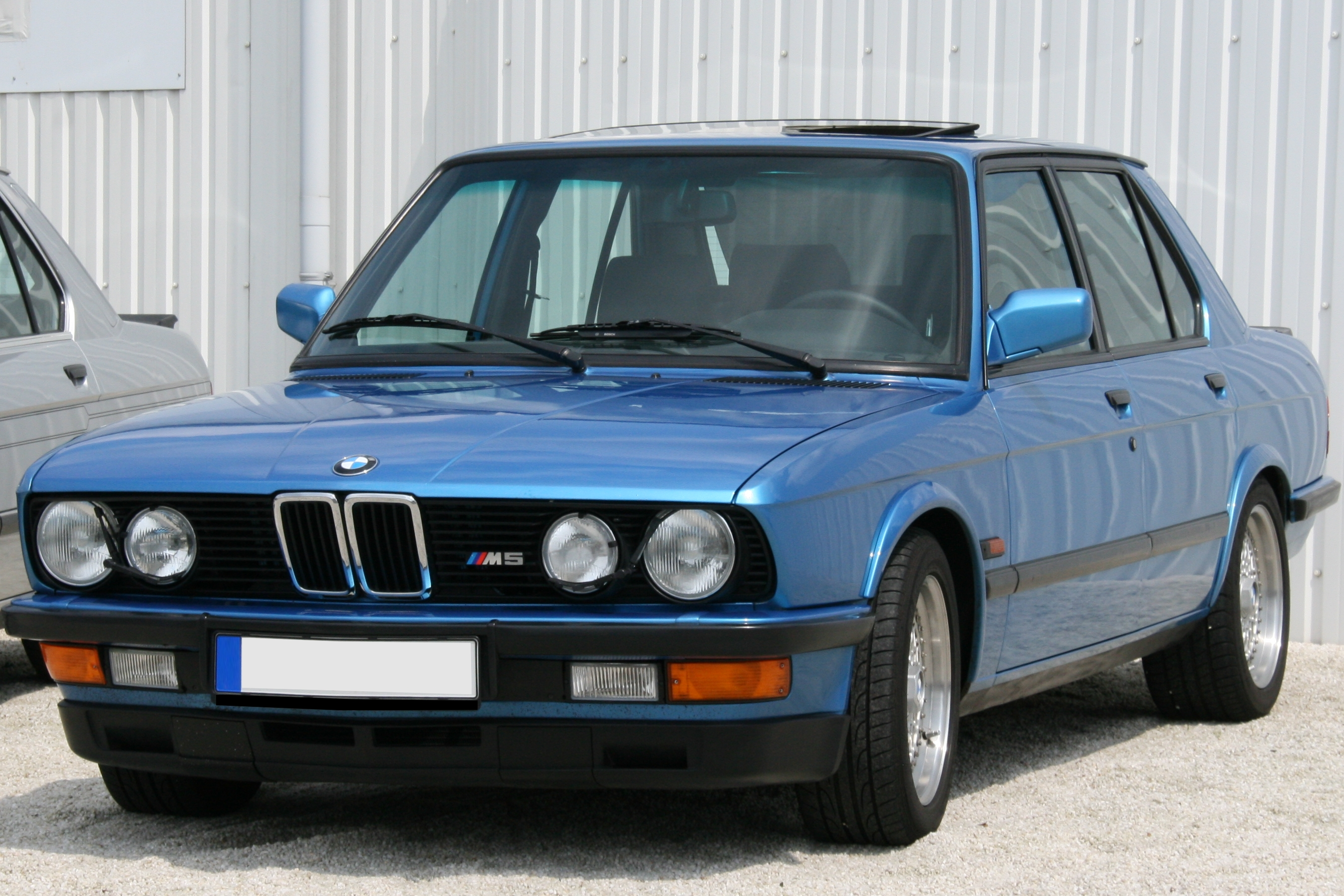
M5 model

The E28 was the first M5 model produced, and is powered by the M88/3 and S38 straight-six engines.

== North American market models ==
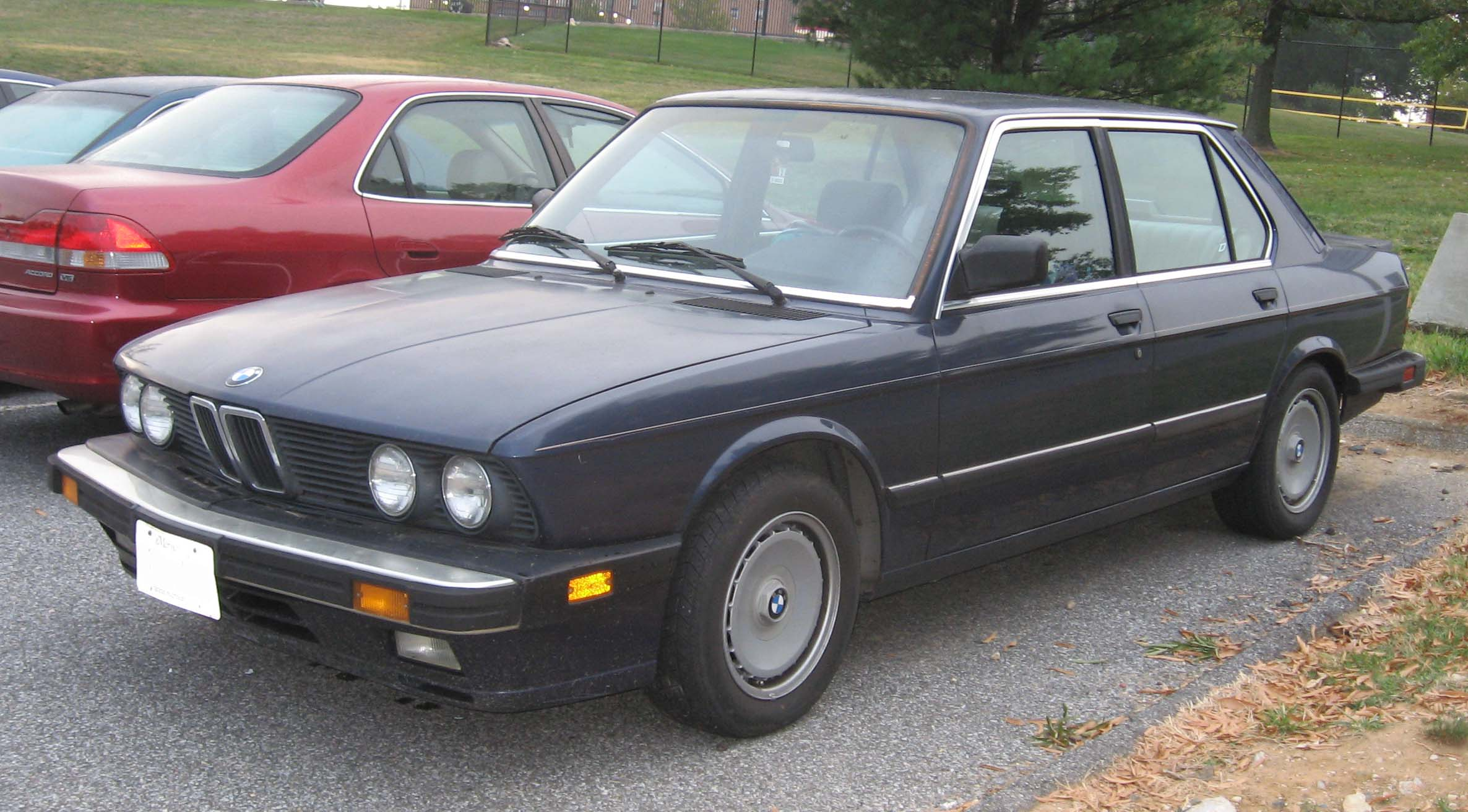
BMW 535is (North America)

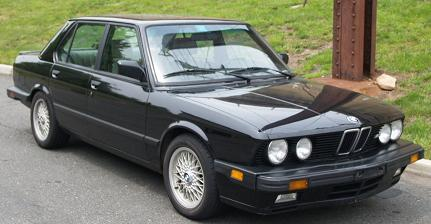
North American M5

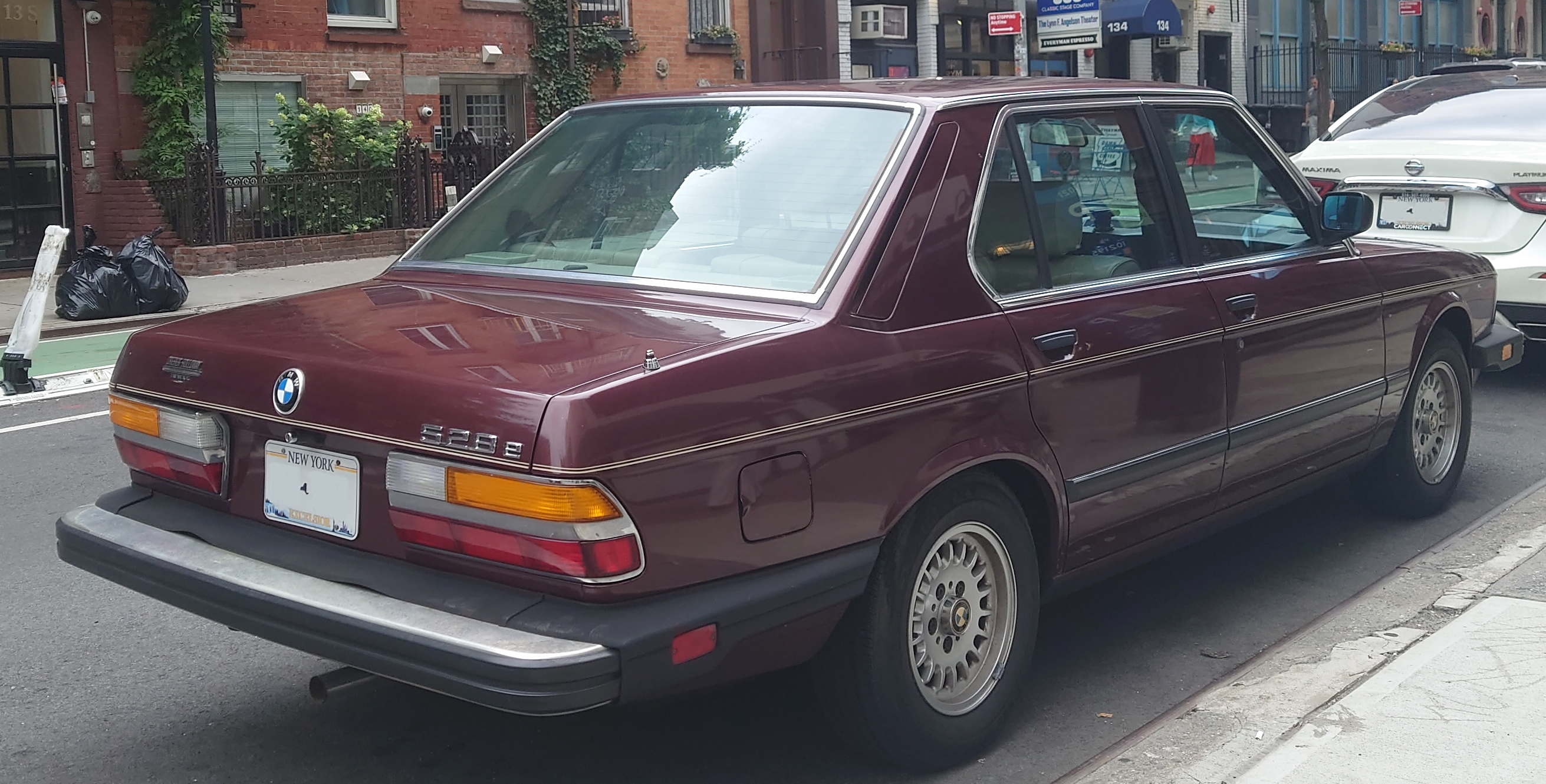
BMW 528e rear (North America)

The North American line-up consisted of the 528e (1982–1988, known as the 525e in Europe), 533i (1983–1984), 535i (1985–1988), 524td (1985–1986), M5 (1986–1987) and 535is (1987–1988).

The launch model was the 528e in 1982, followed by the 533i. The optional automatic transmission was initially a 3-speed (a 4-speed automatic was available in Europe at the time), with a 4-speed automatic transmission becoming optional in 1983. From 1985, all North American models had ABS Brakes as standard.

The 528e, 533i and 535i were sold with catalytic converters in the United States. The North American E28 models had larger bumpers (designed to withstand a 5 mph (8.0 km/h) collision without body damage), which increased the overall length by 180 mm (7.1 in).

Instead of importing the M535i, BMW of North America created the 535is. This model is based on a 535i, plus front and rear spoilers, sport suspension and sport seats.

Production of North American market M5 models began in late 1986 (two years after M5 production began for European markets), and it was only produced for twelve months as 1988 model year car. North American M5 models use the S38 engine instead of the M88/3. All North American M5 cars were painted Jet Black and most interiors were tan ("Natur") coloured leather.

== Production ==
E28 production started in July 1981 and ended in December 1987. A total of 722,328 cars were built.

The E28 was still sold in North America as a 1988 Model Year car after its E34 successor had been released in Europe in early 1988. A limited-edition model was also sold in South Africa from mid-1987 to the end of 1988.
