= BMW M20 =

BMW M20 engine
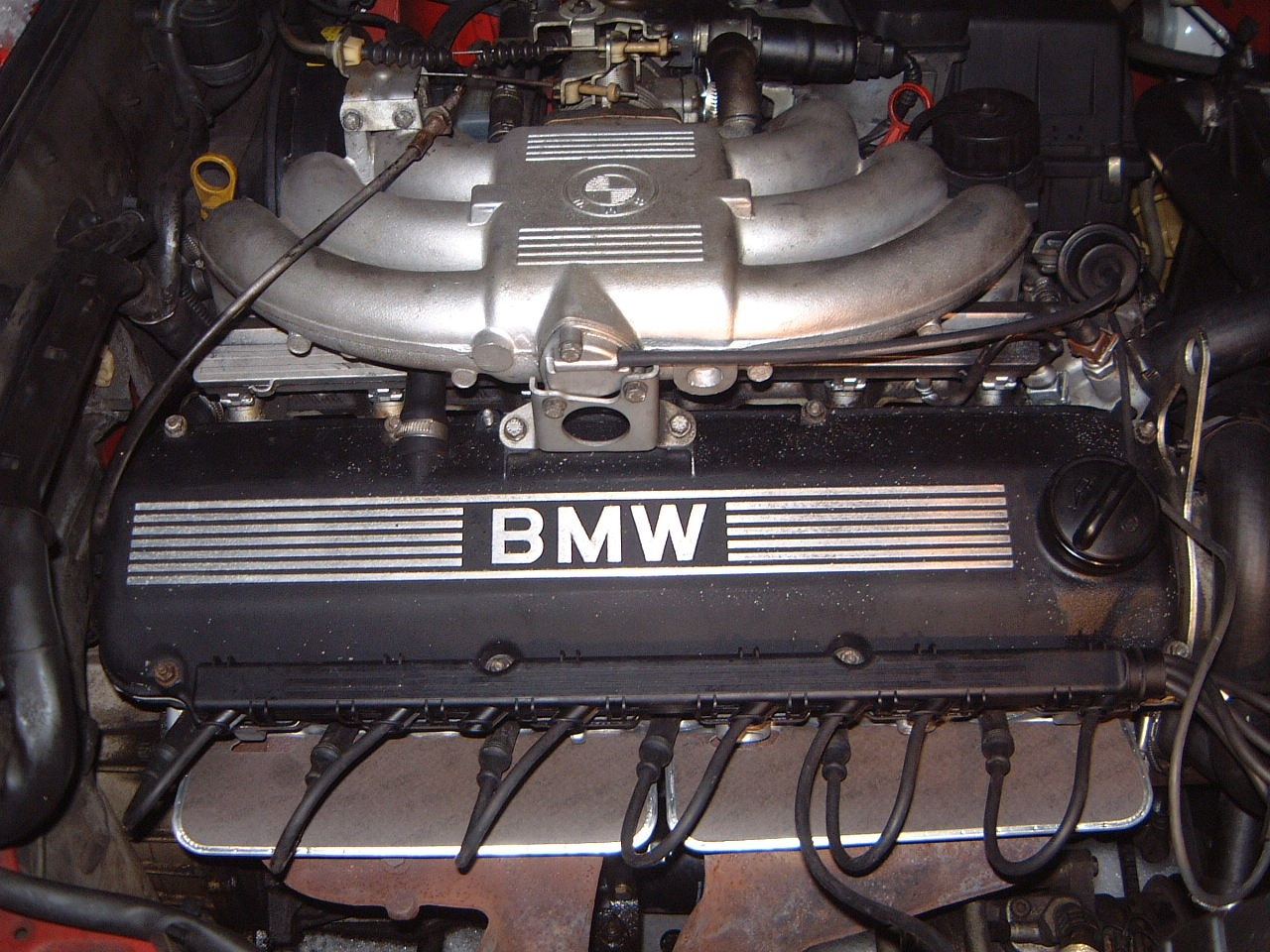

Overview
- Production: 1977–1993

Layout
- Configuration: Straight-6
- Displacement: 2.0 L (1,991 cc); 2.3 L (2,316 cc); 2.5 L (2,494 cc); 2.7 L (2,693 cc)
- Cylinder bore: 80 mm (3.15 in); 84 mm (3.31 in)
- Piston stroke: 66 mm (2.60 in); 75 mm (2.95 in); 76.8 mm (3.02 in); 81 mm (3.19 in)
- Cylinder block material: Cast iron
- Cylinder head material: Cast aluminum alloy
- Valvetrain: SOHC

Combustion
- Fuel type: Petrol

Chronology
- Predecessor: None
- Successor: BMW M50

The BMW M20 is a SOHC straight-six petrol engine which was produced from 1977 to 1993. The first BMW models to use the M20 were the E12 5 Series and the E21 3 Series. It was introduced eight years after the larger BMW M30 straight-six engine which remained in production alongside the M20. Due to their time being produced simultaneously, the smaller-displacement M20 was affectionately named the 'Little Six'; while the larger-displacement M30 garnered the names 'Big Six' and 'Senior Six'.

The M20 laid the groundwork design that all inline-six engines going forward would follow and was also the basis for the BMW M21 diesel engine and its descendants. It is also loosely related to the BMW M70 V12 petrol engine.

The M20 began to be phased out following the introduction of the M50 engine in 1990, with the final examples fitted to the E30 3 Series touring and convertible models built in April 1993.

Early versions of the M20 were sometimes referred to as the "M60", although the M60 designation has since been re-used for a V8 engine produced from 1992 to 1996.

== History ==
By the 1970s, BMW saw a need for a new I6 engine to bridge the displacement gap between their smaller M10 I4 and the M30 I6 engines. Despite being a turbine-smooth inline-6, the M30 was too large and too heavy to fit in the E21 3 Series engine bay. While the M10 had already been fit to the E21, it became too buzzy and unrefined at larger displacements; as 2.0 L is typically an upper limit for inline-4 engines in terms of maintaining refinement. Thus, it was decided that a 2.0L variant of a newly developed I6 would offer European buyers refinement and smoothness while bypassing European displacement taxes, with the ability to be evolved for accommodating to the tightening emissions standards of the 1970s and 1980s.

In 1977, BMW debuted the M20 engine at the 1977 IAA in two forms: a 2.0 L variant with Solex 4A1 carburetor making 90 kW and a 2.3 L variant with Bosch K-Jetronic MPFI making 105 kW; both variants had a 80 mm bore. In 1982 BMW increased the bore to 84mm, ultimately leading to 2.5 L and 2.7 L variants.

== Design ==
Like the M10 and M30, the M20 block is a closed deck design that is made out of cast iron and features siamesed cylinder bores. The cylinder head is likewise a cross-flow design made out of cast aluminum alloy with a SOHC 2-valve per cylinder valvetrain layout. Rocker arms with manually adjustable eccentric pushers actuate the valves.

The M20 differs from the M10 and M30 in various ways. The camshaft is driven using timing belt instead of a timing chain to reduce noise and production costs. The bore spacing was reduced from 100 mm (3.9 in) to 91 mm (3.6 in) to reduce engine length and weight. The slant angle was reduced from 30 degrees to 20 degrees when mounting the engine in the engine bay, resulting in a more upright engine.

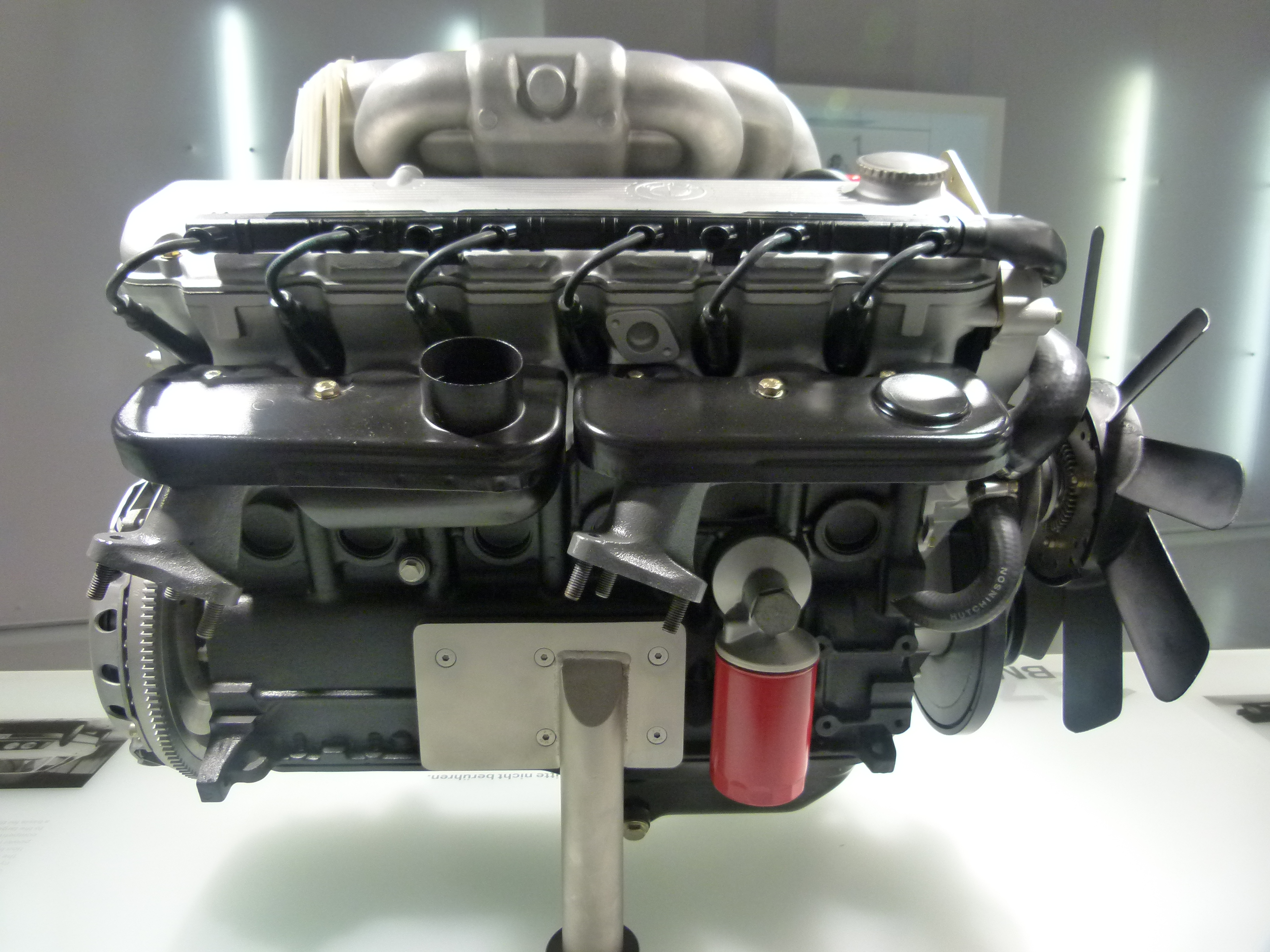
M20 engine - exhaust side

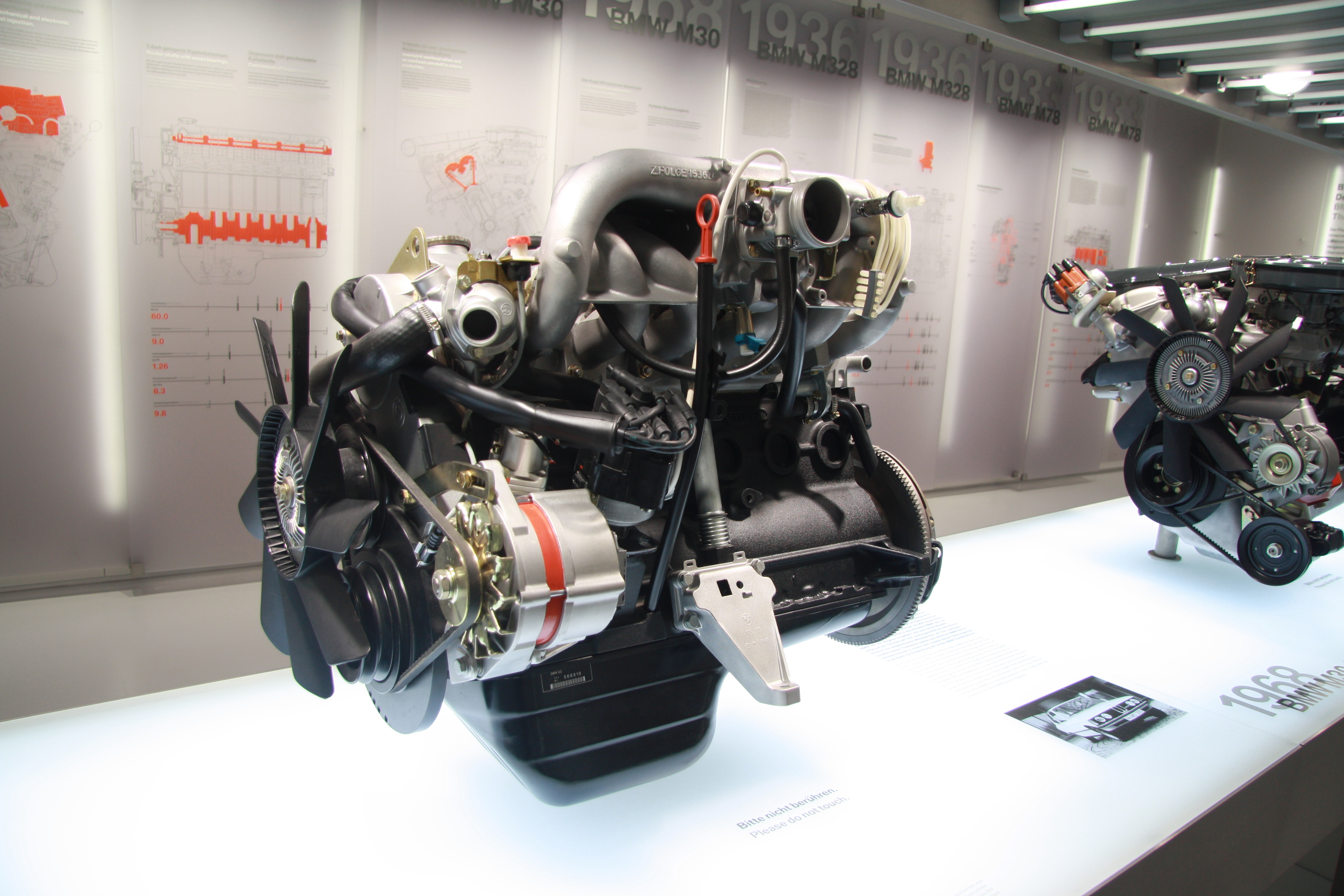
M20 engine - intake side

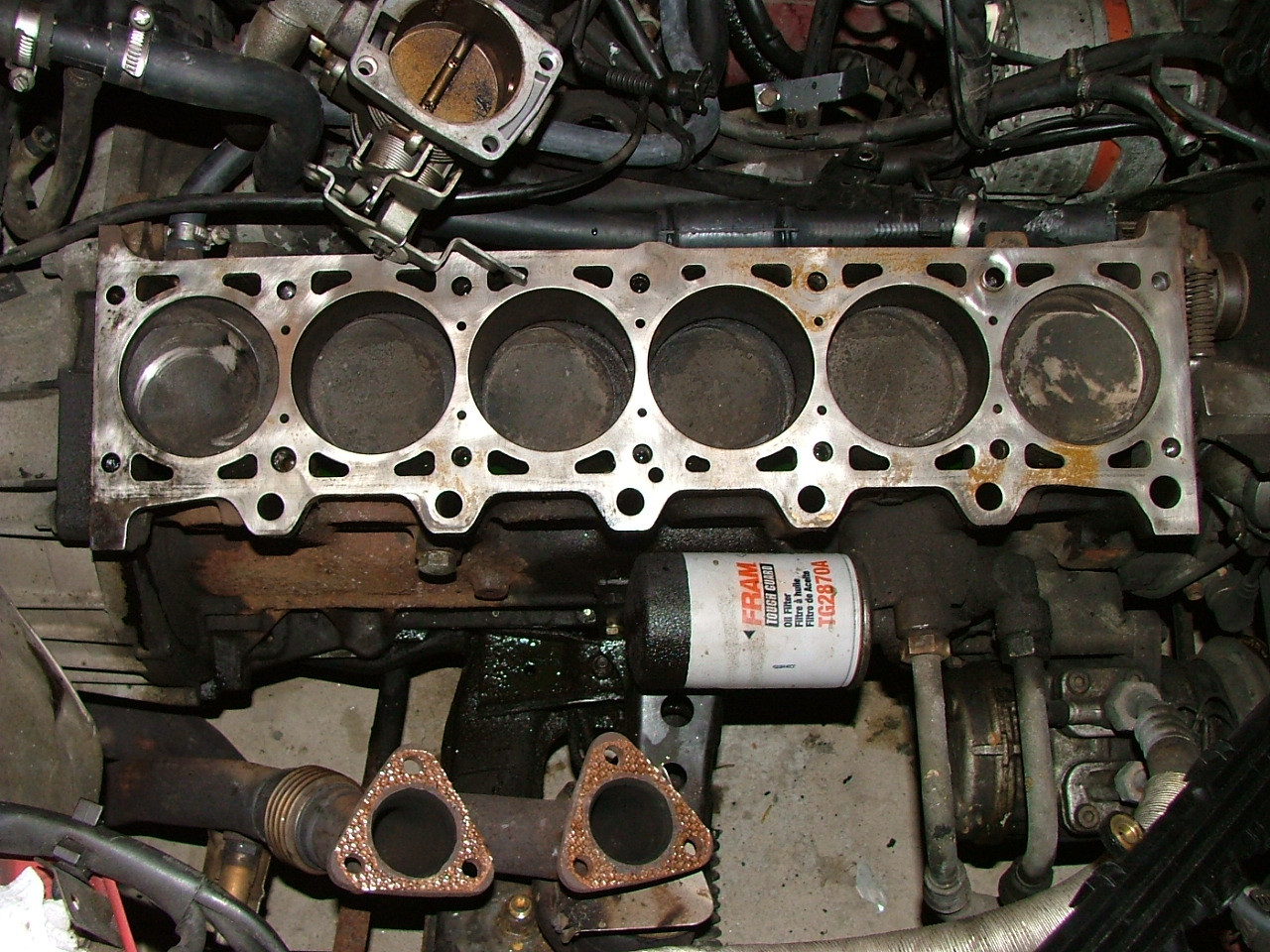
M20 engine - top view of block and exhaust downpipe

Throughout the M20's production run, three different cylinder head casting variants were used:

- 1264200 (200): this variant was used for pre-1983 M20B20 and M20B23 engines, as well as in the pre-1988 M20B27 engine. This casting features very small intake ports with 40mm intake and 34 mm exhaust valves.
- 1277731 (731): this variant was used for post-1982 M20B20 and M20B23 engines. It keeps the same valve diameters as the 200 casting but enlarges the intake ports.
- 1705885 (885): this variant was used for the M20B25 and the 1988 M20B27 engines. This casting features the largest intake ports. The intake and exhaust valve diameters are both enlarged by 2 mm each over the 200 and 731 castings.

== Models ==
Version	Displacement	Power	Torque	Bore	Stroke	Compression Ratio	Years	Notes
M20B20	1,991 cc (121.5 cu in)	90 kW (122 PS; 121 hp) at 6,000 rpm	163 N⋅m (120 lb⋅ft) at 4,000 rpm	80 mm (3.15 in)	66 mm (2.60 in)	9.2:1	1977-1982	Solex 4A1 variant
M20B20	1,991 cc (121.5 cu in)	92 kW (125 PS; 123 bhp) at 5,800 rpm	170 N⋅m (125 lb⋅ft) at 4,000 rpm	80 mm (3.15 in)	66 mm (2.60 in)	9.0:1 (catalyst) 9.8:1 (non-catalyst)	1982-1984	L-Jetronic fuel injection with "200" head
M20B20	1,991 cc (121.5 cu in)	92 kW (125 PS; 123 bhp) at 5,800 rpm	174 N⋅m (128 lb⋅ft) at 4,000 rpm	80 mm (3.15 in)	66 mm (2.60 in)	9.0:1 (catalyst) 9.8:1 (non-catalyst)	1984-1987	LE-Jetronic fuel injection with "731" head
M20B20	1,991 cc (121.5 cu in)	95 kW (129 PS; 127 bhp) at 6,000 rpm	164 N⋅m (121 lb⋅ft) at 4,300 rpm	80 mm (3.15 in)	66 mm (2.60 in)	8.8:1	1986-1992	Motronic 1.1/1.3 engine management Compression ratio reduced to accommodate emissions controls and unleaded gasoline
M20B23	2,316 cc (141.3 cu in)	105 kW (143 PS; 141 bhp) at 5,300 rpm	190 N⋅m (140 lb⋅ft) at 4,500 rpm	80 mm (3.15 in)	76.8 mm (3.02 in)	9.5:1	1977-1982	K-Jetronic fuel injection
M20B23	2,316 cc (141.3 cu in)	102 kW (139 PS; 137 bhp) at 5,300 rpm	205 N⋅m (151 lb⋅ft) at 4,000 rpm	80 mm (3.15 in)	76.8 mm (3.02 in)	9.0:1 (catalyst) 9.8:1 (non-catalyst)	1982-1983	L-Jetronic
M20B23	2,316 cc (141.3 cu in)	110 kW (150 PS; 148 bhp) at 6,000 rpm	205 N⋅m (151 lb⋅ft) at 4,000 rpm	80 mm (3.15 in)	76.8 mm (3.02 in)	9.0:1 (catalyst) 9.8:1 (non-catalyst)	1983-1987	LE-Jetronic
M20B25	2,494 cc (152.2 cu in)	126 kW (171 PS; 169 bhp) at 5,800 rpm	226 N⋅m (167 lb⋅ft) at 4,000 rpm	84 mm (3.31 in)	75 mm (2.95 in)	9.4:1	1985-1990	For markets that did not require a catalytic converter
M20B25	2,494 cc (152.2 cu in)	125 kW (170 PS; 168 hp) at 5,800 rpm	226 N⋅m (167 lb⋅ft) at 4,300 rpm	84 mm (3.31 in)	75 mm (2.95 in)	8.8:1	1987-1993	For markets that required a catalytic converter
M20B27	2,693 cc (164.3 cu in)	90 kW (122 PS; 121 hp) at 4,250 rpm	230 N⋅m (170 lb⋅ft) at 3,250 rpm	84 mm (3.31 in)	81 mm (3.19 in)	9.0:1	1982-1987	For markets that required a catalytic converter
M20B27	2,693 cc (164.3 cu in)	92 kW (125 PS; 123 hp) at 4,250 rpm	240 N⋅m (177 lb⋅ft) at 3,250 rpm	84 mm (3.31 in)	81 mm (3.19 in)	11.0:1	1982-1985	For markets that did not require a catalytic converter Early high compression variant
M20B27	2,693 cc (164.3 cu in)	95 kW (129 PS; 127 hp) at 4,250 rpm	240 N⋅m (177 lb⋅ft) at 3,250 rpm	84 mm (3.31 in)	81 mm (3.19 in)	10.2:1	1985-1987	For markets that did not require a catalytic converter Compression ratio reduced to mitigate knocking
M20B27	2,693 cc (164.3 cu in)	95 kW (129 PS; 127 hp) at 4,800 rpm	240 N⋅m (177 lb⋅ft) at 3,200 rpm	84 mm (3.31 in)	81 mm (3.19 in)	8.5:1	1988	"Super" Eta engine Motronic 1.1

=== M20B20 ===
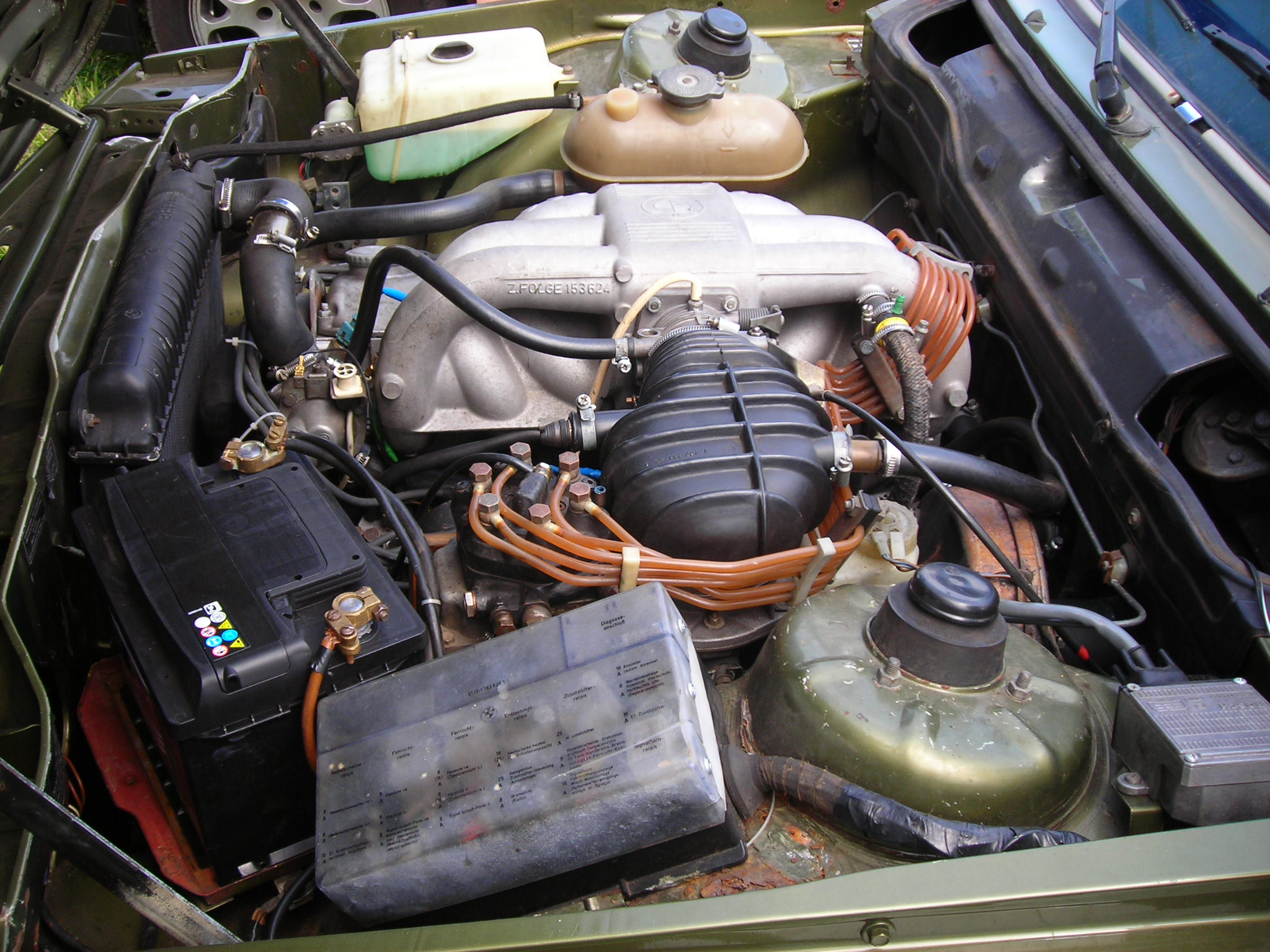
Early M20 engine with K-Jetronic

The first models to use the M20B20 were the E12 520/6 and the E21 320/6, which used a 1,991 cc (121 cu in) version known as the M20B20VE or M60/2. This engine uses a bore of 80 mm (3.15 in) and a stroke of 66 mm (2.60 in). A Solex 4A1 four-barrel carburetor was used in the M20B20VE ("VE" is for vergaser- "carburettor" in German), and it has a compression ratio of 9.2:1 and a redline of 6,400 rpm.

Applications:

- 1977–1981 E12 5 Series 520/6 (carburettor)
- 1977–1982 E21 3 Series 320/6 (carburettor)

==== M20B20KE ====
The M20 first became fuel-injected in 1981, with Bosch K-Jetronic used in a 92 kW (123 hp) version called the M20B20KE. The compression ratio was raised to 9.9:1.

Applications:

- 1981–1982 E28 5 Series 520i (K-Jetronic)

==== M20B20LE ====
In September 1982 (coinciding with the release of the E30 3 Series), the fuel injection was updated to LE-Jetronic with a redline of 6,200 rpm. Other upgrades included a larger port (known as "731") cylinder head, a lighter block and new manifolds. The "M60" designation was dropped and this version was known as the M20B20LE.

Applications:

- 1982–1984 E28 5 Series 520i (L-Jetronic)
- 1982–1984 E30 3 Series 320i (L-Jetronic)
- 1984–1987 E28 5 Series 520i (LE-Jetronic)
- 1984–1987 E30 3 Series 320i (LE-Jetronic)

==== M20B20 (Motronic) ====
In 1987, the M20B20 was again revised with the addition of Bosch Motronic engine management, a catalytic converter and a compression ratio of 8.8:1.

Applications:

- 1986–1987 E28 3 Series 520i (Motronic)
- 1987–1992 E30 3 Series 320i (Motronic)
- 1988–1990 E34 5 Series 520i (Motronic)
- 1989–1992 Bertone Freeclimber (Freeclimber I)

The M20B20 was not sold in the United States, but was available in the E30 (320i) in Canada.

=== M20B23 ===
In March 1978 (six months after the M20 was launched), a fuel-injected and larger displacement version known as the M20B23KE (or M60/5) was introduced. This version uses the same head (known as "200") and block as the 2.0 litre version but a longer 76.8 mm (3.02 in) stroke crank. The bore is 80 mm (3.15 in) and it has a capacity of 2,316 cc (2.3 L). Fuel injection was K-Jetronic, the compression ratio is 9.5:1, the power output is 105 kW (143 PS; 141 hp) and the redline is 6,400 rpm.

The 1982 version used LE-Jetronic, the 731 cylinder head, a compression ratio of 9.8:1 and the other upgrades as the per the 2.0 litre version. This version is called the M20B23LE and has a power output of 102 kW (137 hp).

In September 1983, the M20B23LE's fuel-injection, exhaust and camshaft were upgraded and power increased to 110 kW (148 hp) with a redline of 6,500 rpm. The 102 kW (137 hp) version continued to be available in certain markets with strict emissions regulations (such as Switzerland) until replaced by the 325i.

The M20B23 versions were not sold in North America.

Applications:

- 1977–1982 E21 3 Series 323i (K-Jetronic)
- 1982–1984 E30 3 Series 323i (L-Jetronic)
- 1984–1987 E30 3 Series 323i (LE-Jetronic)

=== M20B25 ===
In 1985, the M20B25 replaced the M20B23. The M20B25 has a capacity of 2,494 cc (152.2 cu in) and initially produced 126 kW (171 PS; 169 hp) (without a catalytic converter). It has an upgraded cylinder head (known as "885"), a bore of 84 mm (3.31 in), a stroke of 75 mm (2.95 in), a compression ratio of 9.4:1, a redline of 6,500 rpm and uses Bosch Motronic 1.1 engine management.

In 1987, a catalyzed model with Motronic 1.3 engine management was introduced. The compression ratio was reduced to 8.8:1 but thanks to the more sophisticated electronics power remained nearly as before, at 125 kW (170 PS; 168 hp). The uncatalyzed engine was kept in production for Southern Europe and other markets where unleaded petrol was not regularly available.

Applications:

- 1985–1993 E30 3 Series 325i
- 1989–1990 E34 5 Series 525i
- 1988–1991 Z1

=== M20B27 ===
The M20B27 was designed for efficiency (thus the e for the Greek letter eta in 325e) and low-rev torque. This is an unusual design strategy for a BMW straight-six engine, which are usually designed for power at high RPM. Compared with the M20B25, the stroke is increased from 75 to 81 mm (2.95 to 3.19 in), resulting in a capacity of 2,693 cc (164.3 cu in). Since many markets tax cars based on engine displacement, the eta's larger displacement meant that it was not suitable for all markets. It was expressly developed with the American market in mind. As per the M20B25, the bore is 84 mm (3.31 in). To reduce friction and improve efficiency, the M20B27 changes include using the '200' version of the head (which has smaller ports), a different camshaft, four camshaft journals and softer valve springs. Due to these changes the rev limit on the M20B27 was reduced to 4,800 rpm. The initial version, called the M20B27ME, produces 92 kW (123 hp) and 240 N⋅m (177 lb⋅ft) at 3,250 rpm for models without a catalytic converter. Models with a catalytic converter produce 90 kW (121 hp) and 230 N⋅m (170 lb⋅ft).

In the United States, BMW's corporate average fuel economy was at risk of not meeting requirements by 1984, primarily due to higher sales of their bigger, more expensive cars in the early 1980s. The first car to use the M20B27 was the US market 528e in 1982. The compression ratio of the U.S. M20B27ME version was 9.0:1, compared with for cars sold elsewhere 11.0:1.

In 1985, the M20B27ME.E version was introduced, increasing power output to 95 kW (127 hp) despite a lower compression ratio of 10.3:1.

For the 1988 model year, the digital motor electronics was upgraded to Motronic 1.1 on the US market plastic bumper 325e and 528e 'Super Eta', the cylinder head changed to the "885" version, the compression ratio was reduced to 8.5:1 and the redline increased to 5,200 rpm. Power output increased to 95 kW (127 hp) at 4,800 rpm.

In the early 1990s BMW South Africa used components from the Alpina C3 2.7 to produce an E30 specifically for Stannic Group N production car racing. The first iteration of this engine used in the E30 325iS produced 145 kW (194 hp) and the second revision, often referred to as "Evo2" or on the VIN plate as "HP2" produced 155 kW (208 hp).

Applications:

- 1982–1987 E30 3 Series 325e, 325e
- 1982–1988 E28 5 Series 525e (called 528e in North America)
- 1989–1992 E30 3 Series 325iS (only available in South Africa)
- 1989–1992 Bertone Freeclimber (Freeclimber I)

== See also ==
- BMW
- List of BMW engines
