= BMW 5 Series (E12) =

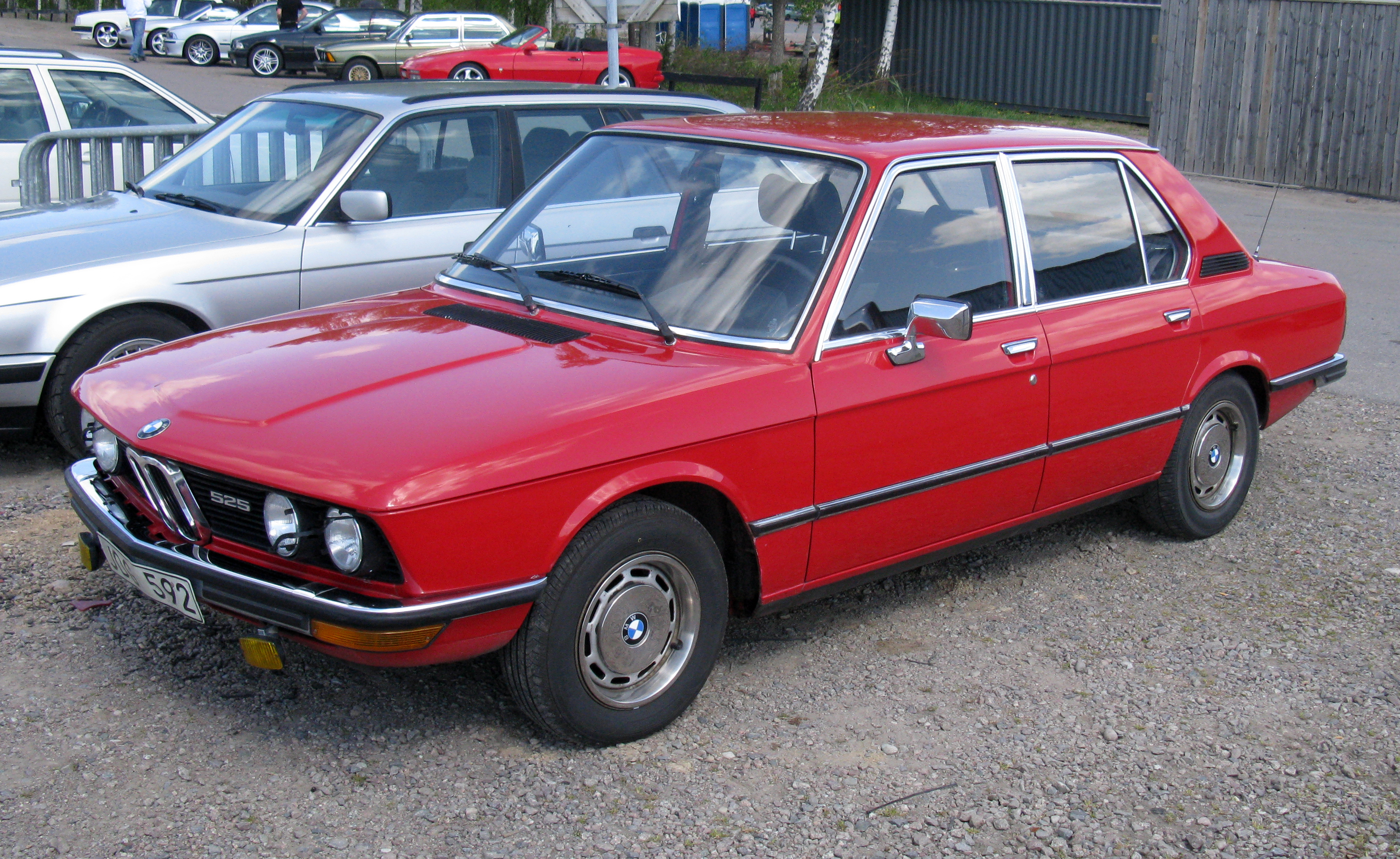

Overview
- Manufacturer: BMW
- Model code: E12
- Production: 1972–1981
- Model years: 1975–1981
- Assembly: West Germany: Dingolfing, Munich; South Africa: Rosslyn (BMW SA); Indonesia: Jakarta (Gaya Motor); Thailand: Bangkok (Yontrakit Group)
- Designer: Paul Bracq; Marcello Gandini

Body and chassis
- Class: Executive car (E)
- Body style: 4-door saloon
- Layout: FR layout
- Related: BMW 6 Series (E24)

Powertrain
- Engine: Petrol: 1.8 L M118 I4; 2.0 L M17/M64 I4; 2.0 L M20B20 I6; 2.5 L M30B25 I6; 2.8 L M30B28 I6; 3.0 L M30B30 I6; 3.2 L M30B32 I6; 3.5 L M90 I6
- Transmission: 4-speed manual; 5-speed manual; 3-speed automatic

Dimensions
- Wheelbase: 2,636 mm (103.8 in)
- Length: 4,620 mm (181.9 in)
- Width: 1,690 mm (66.5 in)
- Height: 1,425 mm (56.1 in)
- Curb weight: 1,235–1,565 kg (2,723–3,450 lb)

Chronology
- Predecessor: BMW New Class
- Successor: BMW 5 Series (E28)

The BMW E12 is the first generation of 5 Series executive cars, which was produced from 1972 to 1981 and replaced the saloon models of the BMW New Class range.

Initial models were powered by inline-four engines, using either a carburettor or fuel-injection. A year after launch, the first model powered by a straight-six engine was introduced. By the final years of E12 production, most models used a straight-six engine.

There was no M5 model for the E12, however the E12 M535i is considered to be the predecessor to the M5. The E24 6 Series coupés were built on the E12 platform up until 1982. The E12 was replaced by the E28 5 Series in 1981, although the tools were sent to South Africa where E12 assembly continued (with E28 interiors) until 1984.

== Development ==
BMW 2200ti Garmisch (replica)

At the 1970 Geneva Motor Show, BMW unveiled the 2200ti Garmisch concept car, a 2-door saloon which was developed in conjunction with Bertone. The 2200ti Garmisch concept car was shown as a potential replacement for the New Class saloons and the eventual E12 production model utilized many design elements from the Garmisch.

Development of the E12-series had begun by the end of the 1960s, when wind tunnel tests were conducted. Eberhard von Kuenheim, then chairman of BMW's supervisory board, hired French designer Paul Bracq in 1970 to work as the E12's Chief of design, with Marcello Gandini of Bertone as co-designers of the exterior.

In 1971, a road-legal E12 prototype, which looked similar to a Fiat 132, was made. Also in 1971, Paul Bracq had finalised the E12's design, however, compared with the later series production E12, Bracq's design car had a more stretched, and dynamic appearance. Computers were used in BMW development for the first time to calculate front and rear crumple zones; the roof was designed with a rollover protection structure. The body has a drag coefficient of 0.44. BMW had previously located turn signal stalks on the right hand side of the steering wheels, and the E12 was their first model to have the stalk on the left side.

Before the E12 had been introduced, there were rumours that it would be available with both a 2.2 litre four-cylinder engine, and a small six-cylinder engine. Instead, BMW carried over the 2-litre four-cylinder M10 engines from the New Class saloons, but modified the cylinder heads in order to improve combustion. With the introduction of the E12-series in 1972, BMW offered two models, the carburetted 520, which had a Stromberg constant pressure carburettor, and the manifold injected 520i, which came with a Kugelfischer PL 04 injection pump. A small six-cylinder model called "523" had been developed, but was never put into series production. Eventually, a small six-cylinder model was put into production in 1977, but in the 2-litre "520" version rather than a 2.3 litre version.

Originally, four-cylinder cars have a bonnet with a sunken central portion whereas on six-cylinder cars this section is raised. The leading edge of the bonnet was flat. After the August 1976 facelift all models featured the same bonnet, with a narrow raised central section reaching all the way forward and wrapping around the "kidneys". M30-engined cars can be identified by the grille having a chrome surround.

To meet Sweden's unique and stringent emissions standards, a fuel injected version of the 528 was developed and entered production in June 1977. Called the 528i, this was successful enough that it replaced the 528 in most markets.

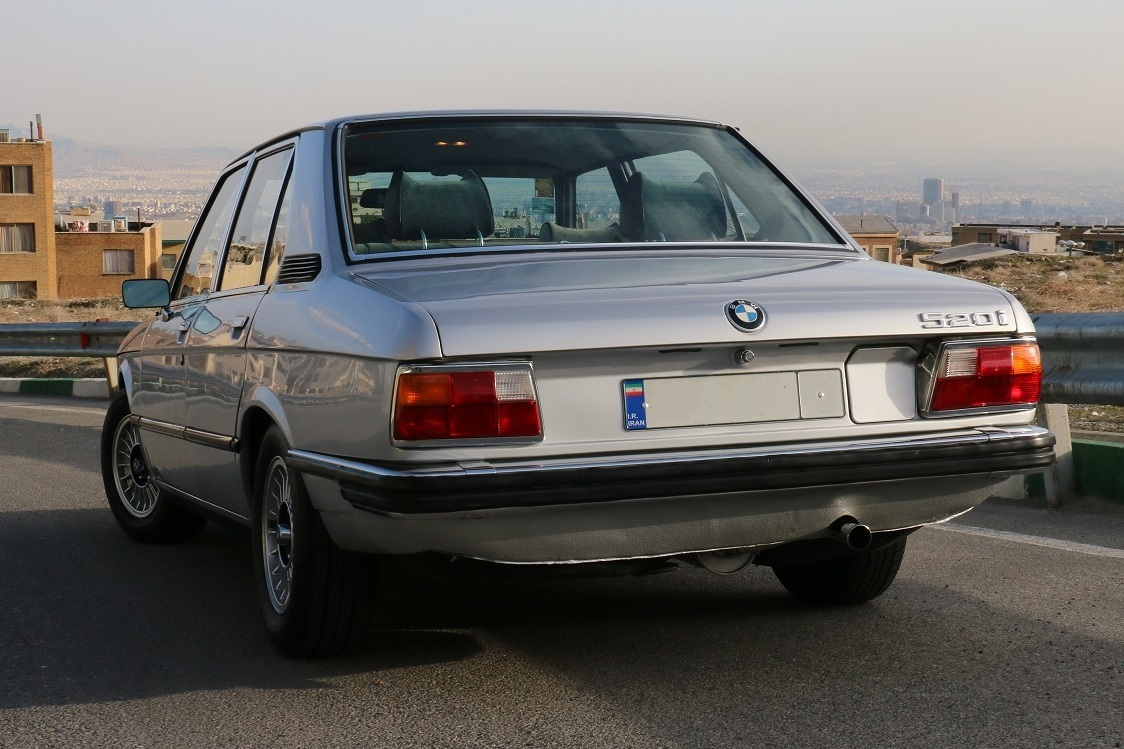
Rear view, until 1976

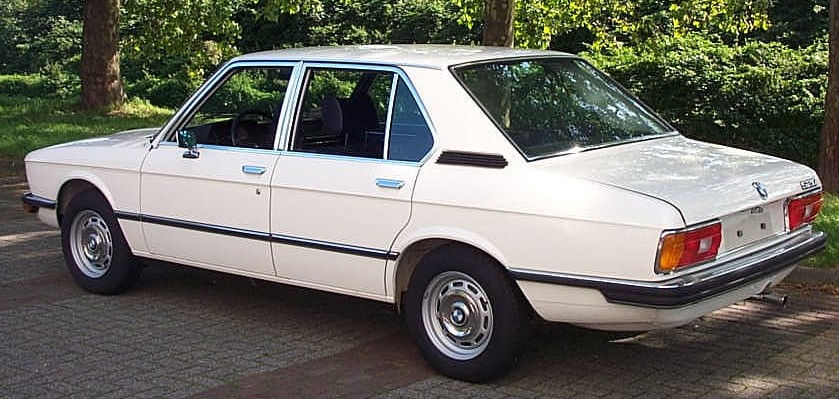
Rear view, after facelift

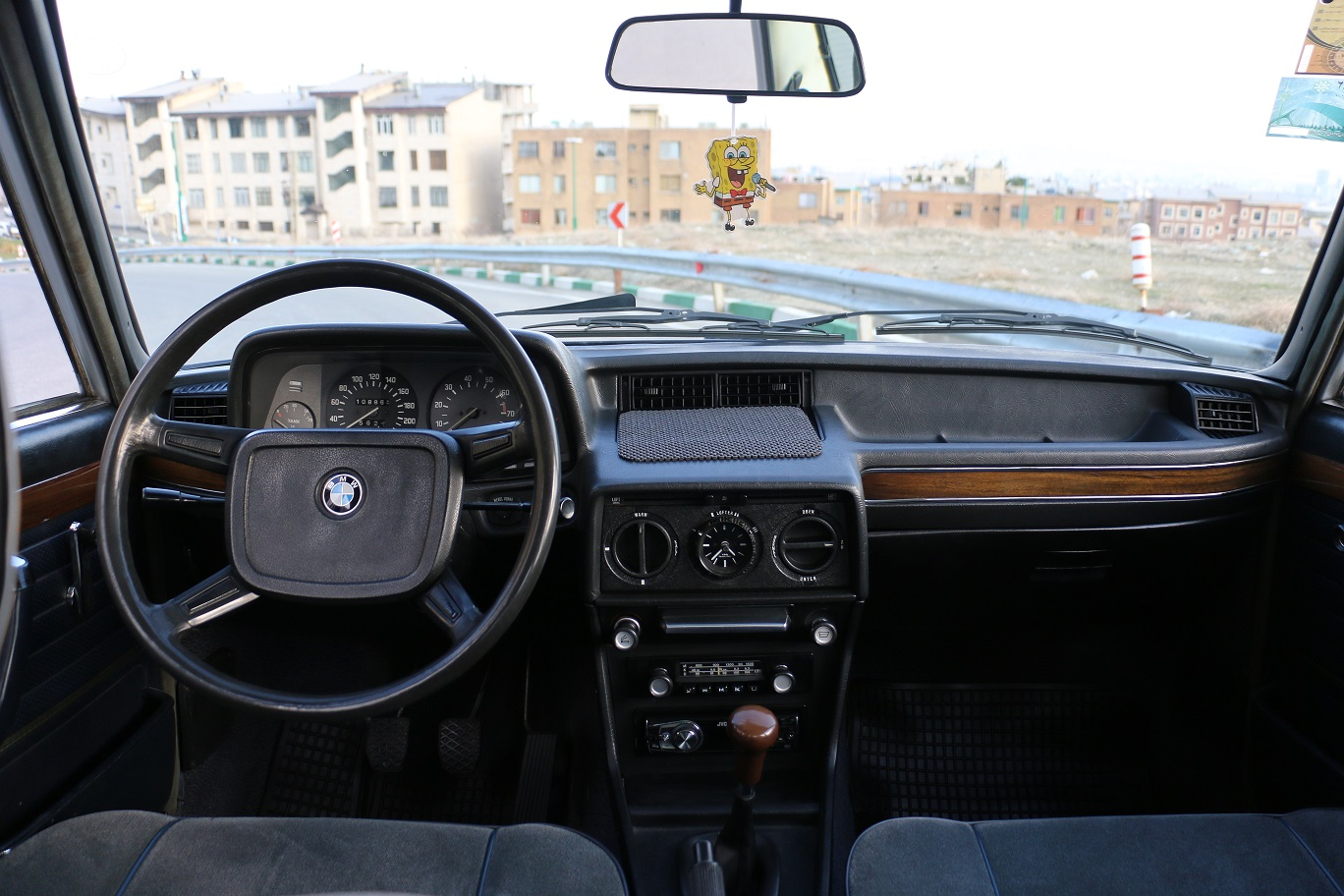
Interior

== Engines ==
Model	Engine	Power	Torque	Years
518	1.8 L M118 straight-4	90 PS (66 kW) at 5,500 rpm	143 N⋅m (105 lb⋅ft) at 3,500 rpm	1974–1981
520	2.0 L M17 straight-4	115 PS (85 kW) at 5,800 rpm	165 N⋅m (122 lb⋅ft) at 3,700 rpm	1972–1977
520i	2.0 L M64 straight-4	130 PS (96 kW) at 5,800 rpm	178 N⋅m (131 lb⋅ft) at 4,500 rpm	1972–1975
520i	2.0 L M64 straight-4	125 PS (92 kW) at 5,700 rpm	172 N⋅m (127 lb⋅ft) at 4,350 rpm	1975–1977
520/6	2.0 L M20B20 straight-6	122 PS (90 kW) at 6,000 rpm	160 N⋅m (118 lb⋅ft) at 4,000 rpm	1976–1981
525	2.5 L M30B25 straight-6	145 PS (107 kW) at 6,000 rpm	211 N⋅m (156 lb⋅ft) at 3,700 rpm	1973–1976
525	2.5 L M30B25 straight-6	150 PS (110 kW) at 5,800 rpm	208 N⋅m (153 lb⋅ft) at 4,000 rpm	1976–1981
528	2.8 L M30B28 straight-6	165 PS (121 kW) at 5,800 rpm	234 N⋅m (173 lb⋅ft) at 4,000 rpm	1974–1976
528	2.8 L M30B28 straight-6	170 PS (125 kW) at 5,800 rpm	234 N⋅m (173 lb⋅ft) at 4,000 rpm	1976–1978
528i	2.8 L M30B28 straight-6	177 PS (130 kW) at 5,800 rpm	246 N⋅m (181 lb⋅ft) at 4,500 rpm	1977–1981 (Sweden)
528i	2.8 L M30B28 straight-6	171 PS; 126 kW; 169 hp at 5,500 rpm	230 N⋅m (170 lb⋅ft) at 4,500 rpm	1979–1981 (US only)
528i	2.8 L M30B28 straight-6	184 PS (135 kW) at 5,800 rpm	235 N⋅m (173 lb⋅ft) at 4,200 rpm	1978–1981
530	3.0 L M30B30 straight-6	177 PS (130 kW) at 5,800 rpm	250 N⋅m (184 lb⋅ft) at 3,500 rpm	1975–1978 (South Africa only)
530i	3.0 L M30B30 straight-6	178 PS; 131 kW; 176 hp at 5,500 rpm	251 N⋅m (185 lb⋅ft) at 4,500 rpm	1975–1978 (US only)
530 MLE	3.0 L M30B30 straight-6	200 PS (147 kW) at 5,800 rpm	251 N⋅m (185 lb⋅ft) at 3,500 rpm	1976 (South Africa only)
533i	3.2 L M30B32 straight-6	200 PS (147 kW) at 5,500 rpm	290 N⋅m (214 lb⋅ft) at 4,250 rpm	1974–1979
M535i	3.5 L M90 straight-6	218 PS (160 kW) at 5,200 rpm	310 N⋅m (229 lb⋅ft) at 4,000 rpm	1980–1981

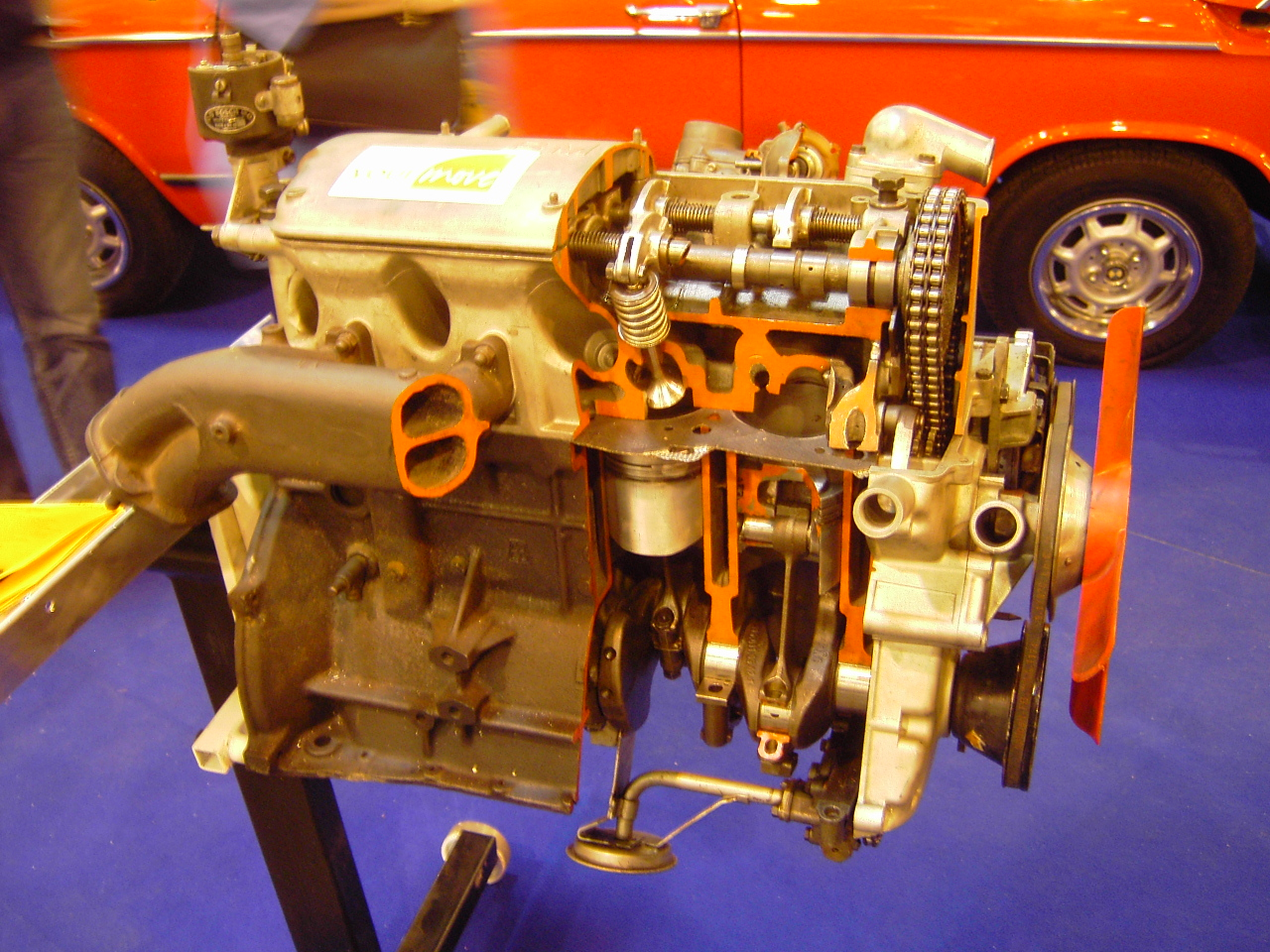
M10 inline-four engine

The data above are manufacturer claims. Power and torque data is measured according to the German Standard DIN 70020.

The 518, 520 and 520i models were fitted with the 1.8 L and 2.0 L M10 inline-four engines, as per the previous New Class saloons. The 525, 528, 530, 530i and 533i models were fitted with M30 straight-six engines, as used in the New Six large saloons and E9 coupés. The 520 (and 523, which was developed but never put into series production) uses the M20 straight-six engine.

The 518 had its fuel supplied by a Solex 32/32 DIDTA carburetor, while the initial 520 model (powered by the M10 inline-four engine) used twin Stromberg 175CDET carburettors. The straight-six engine 525 and 528 models used dual Zenith INAT two-barrel carburettors up until the 1976 facelift. The straight-six 520 used a Solex 4A1 carburettor.

Fuel-injected models have the letter i at the end of their model designation. The 520i used the Kugelfischer mechanical fuel injection system from the 2000tii and 2002tii until 1975. From 1975, it was fitted with a mechanical continuous Bosch K-Jetronic port injection. The 518i (only sold in Sweden and Japan), 528i, and 530i (only sold in the US and Japan) have a Bosch L-Jetronic port injection.

== Suspension ==
The BMW E12 has a self-supporting body, a longitudinally mounted front engine, and rear-wheel drive. All four wheels are suspended independently. The front wheels have MacPherson struts with coil springs, hydraulic shock absorbers, and transverse control arms. The rear axle has semi-trailing arms with coil springs, and hydraulic shock absorbers. Models with a power output of 125 PS (92 kW) or more have an additional sway bar on the rear axle. All models except the M535i have 14-inch steel alloy wheels with a wheel-width of either 5.5 or 6 inches. Therefore, the tyre size is either 175 mm or 195 mm. All models use worm and sector steering, which is power assisted from the 528 onwards. The braking system is a dual-circuit system with front disc brakes; on the rear wheels, 518/520/i models were fitted with drum brakes, all models from the 525 onwards have disc brakes.

== Drivetrain ==
The 4-speed manual transmission options consisted of:

- Getrag 242 4-speed (for M10/M20/M30 engine models)
- Getrag 262 4-speed (M30 engine)
- ZF S4-18/3 4-speed (M30 engine)

The 5-speed manual transmission options consisted of:

- Getrag 235 5-speed (M10 engine)
- Getrag 245 5-speed (M10/M20 engines)
- Getrag 265 5-speed (M30 engine)

The automatic transmission options—all 3-speed transmissions—consisted of:

- ZF 3HP12 (M10 engine)
- ZF 3HP20 (M30 engine)
- ZF 3HP22 (M20/M30 engines)
- BorgWarner BW65 (M30 engine)

== Special models ==
On the Belgian and Greek markets, there was a BMW 518 Deluxe version. One thousand of these cars were sold in 1979–1980. This was a BMW 518 equipped as the 528i top model with additional luxury items such as headrests on the back seats, tachometer, and power mirrors. This special version was initially produced for the Iranian government, as a car for top officials under the Shah's rule. Due to the Iranian Revolution the majority of these cars were never delivered – instead, they were sold as a special version in Belgium and Greece.

The Portuguese market also received nearly 700 CKD units due to the local regulations that demanded a certain number of vehicles sold in Portugal to be locally assembled.

For the Swedish market the complete BMW 5 range was not offered, due to local emissions regulations. For the early E12 the models BMW 518, BMW 520, BMW 520i, and BMW 525 were offered - with the BMW 528 missing. The series 2 range of was reduced to three models: BMW 518i, BMW 520i and BMW 528i. The 528i became available as a result of Switzerland having adopted the same emissions rules, making it worthwhile to develop such a version. Unique to the Swedish market were a BMW 518i and a BMW 520i, fitted with the identical 2 litre engine, but the BMW 518i receiving poorer equipment. The BMW 520i was fitted with chromed wheel rings and a locking fuel cap. It was also fitted with head restraints in the rear, an armrest in the middle of the rear bench, steering wheel height adjustment, seat height adjustment for the drivers seat, a wooden shifter knob, and a rear heater.

=== Motorsport versions ===
Beginning in 1974, BMW M (then called 'BMW Motorsport') offered the Motorsport 530, Motorsport 530i and Motorsport 533i as special order upgrades for the 525, 528 and 528i models. The Motorsport 530 used the carburetted 180 PS (132 kW; 178 hp) engine from the BMW 3.0S, the Motorsport 530i used the fuel-injected 200 PS (147 kW; 197 hp) engine from the BMW 3.0Si and the Motorsport 533i used the injected 3.2-liter engine from the E24 633CSi. Other modifications were a shorter differential ratio of (3.45:1 for the 530 and 3.25:1 for the 530i), a 25 percent LSD, vented disc brakes, Bilstein shock absorbers, Scheel or Recaro sports seats, a sports steering wheel, alloy wheels on lower profile tyres, and optional front and rear spoilers.

Later, the similar Motorsport 535i package was available for the 525i/528i model, consisting of the 3.5-litre engine from the E24 635CSi.

=== M535i ===
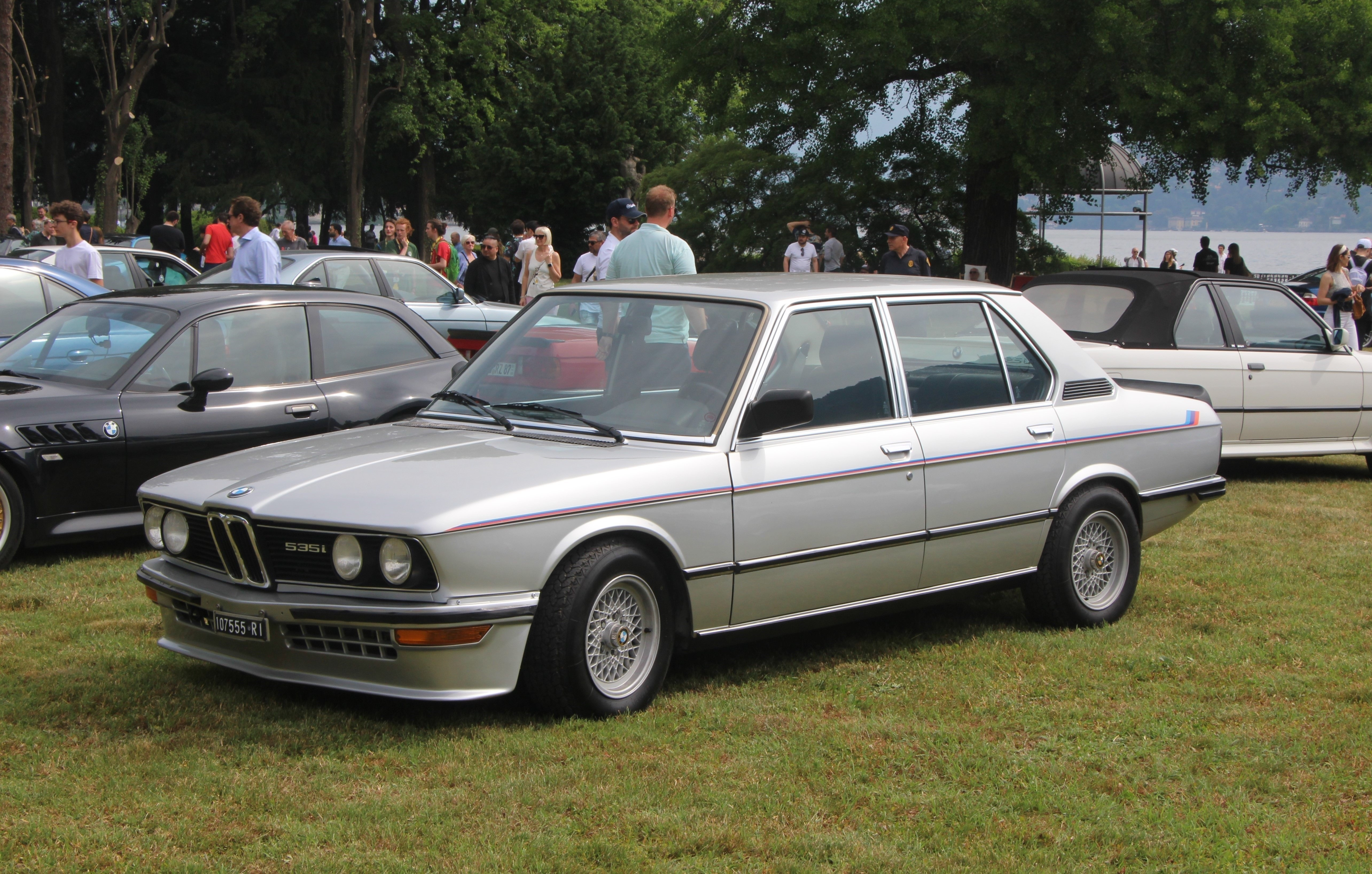
M535i model at Concorso d'Eleganza Villa d'Este, Villa Erba 2022

The first M-badged 5 Series was the M535i, which began production in 1980. The M535i is powered by the 3.5 L (214 cu in) M90 straight-six engine which produces 160 kW (215 bhp). The sole gearbox choice is a 5-speed manual and 1,650 M535i cars were produced (including 240 CKD for South Africa). Features include optional front and rear spoilers, optional M-striping, sports suspension, Recaro sport seats, the steering wheel from the BMW M1, a dogleg close-ratio transmission, a limited-slip differential and larger brakes.

The M535i is considered to be the predecessor to the BMW M5 model, which has been produced since the E28 generation.

=== Alpina B7 ===
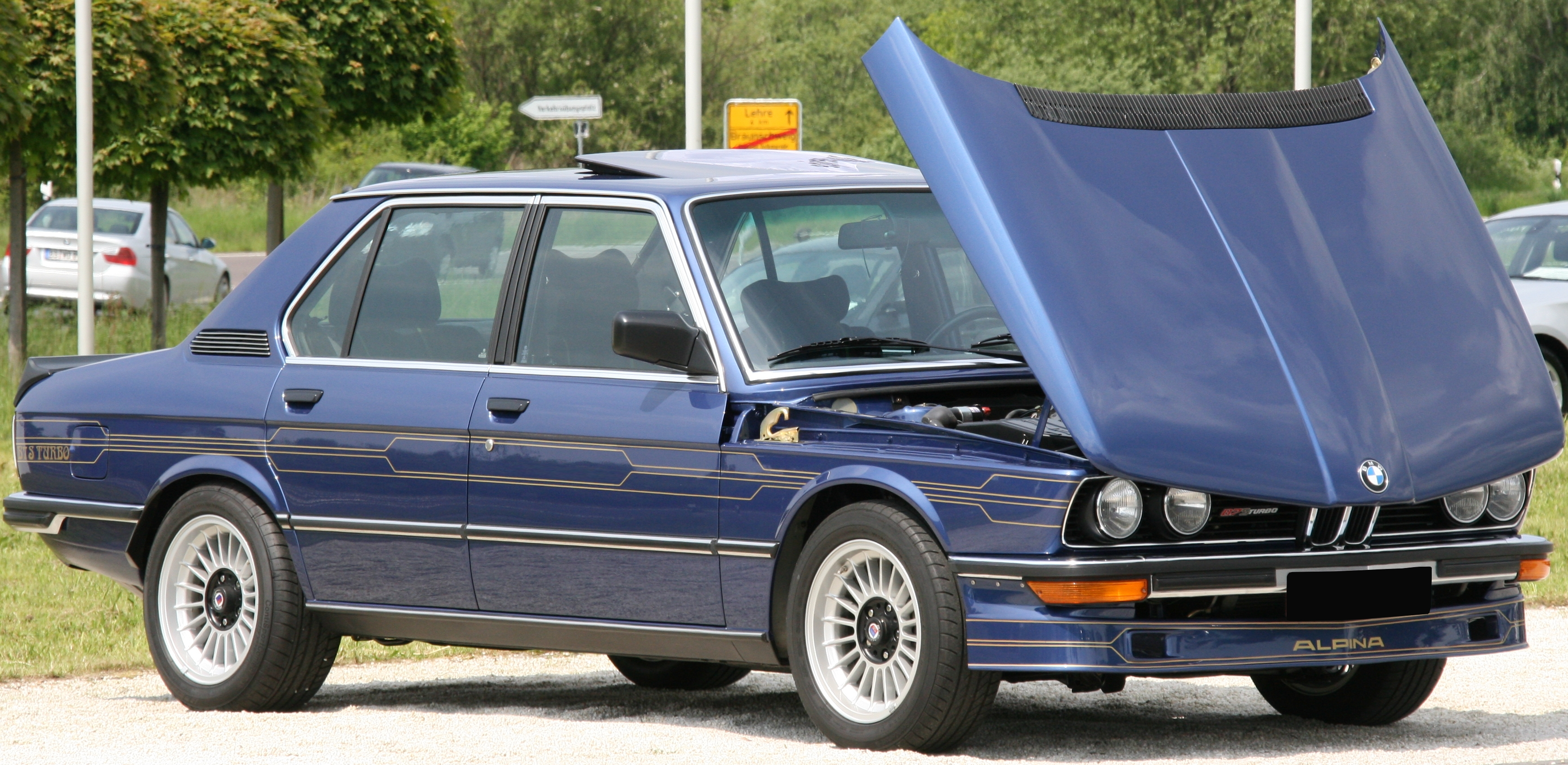
Alpina B7 S Turbo

The Alpina B7 Turbo and B7 S Turbo were based on the E12.

=== 530 MLE ===
In South Africa, the 530 MLE was produced as a homologation special for racing, with 218 cars produced. The engine is a 3.0 L (183 cu in) M30, producing 132 kW (177 bhp). Significant weight reduction measures were undertaken, including body panels made from aluminium or thinner steel.

== Model year changes ==
1974

- 518 and 528 models introduced, producing 90 PS (66 kW; 89 hp) and 165 PS (121 kW; 163 hp) respectively.. Motorsport upgrades available as special order in 530, 530i or 533i guise.

1975

- On the 520i model, Kugelfischer injection was replaced by Bosch K Jetronic.

1976 facelift

With the introduction of the E23 7 Series, the E12 received a facelift in September 1976. The styling was overseen by Claus Luthe. The rear-mounted gasoline filler door was relocated to the side of the car and the taillights were widened. The hood was redesigned to a give a 'power bulge' which accentuated the BMW kidney grille, and the dashboard ventilation was repositioned to improve air distribution.

As part of the facelift, the 520 model switched from the M10 inline-four engine to the BMW M20 straight-six engine, with the post-facelift 520 model often referred to as the 520/6. However, the M10 engine continued to be used in South Africa, due to local content laws. Even after the M20 entered local production in 1979, the 2.0-litre M10 continued to be available with "518" badges in South Africa. In other markets the only inline-four M10 post-facelift model available was the 1.8-litre 518 which carried on as the base model until the end of production.

For the 525 and 528 models, the dual Zenith carburettors were replaced with a single Solex 4A1 DVG four-barrel, which increased power to 170 PS (125 kW; 168 hp) in the 528.

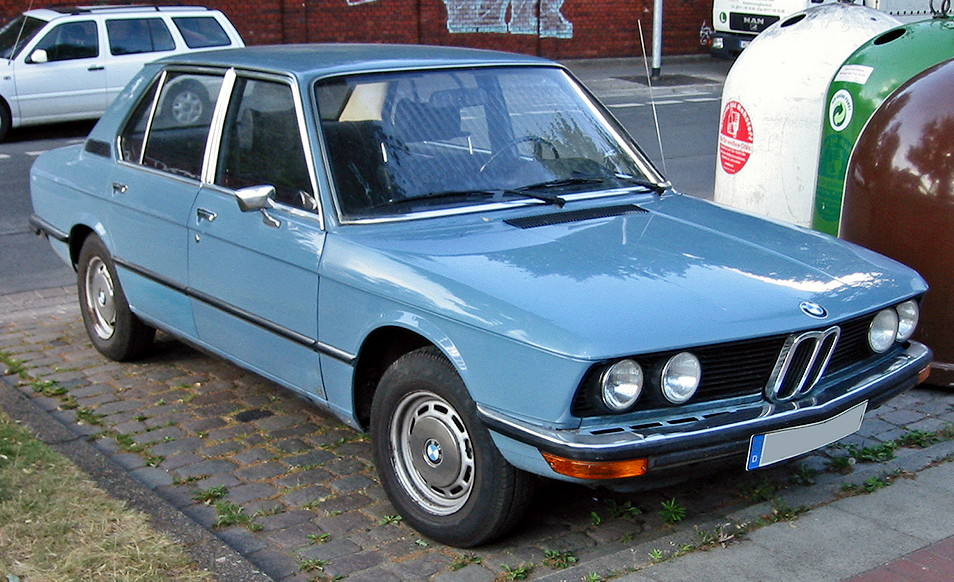
Pre-facelift front
until 1976 (four-cylinder)

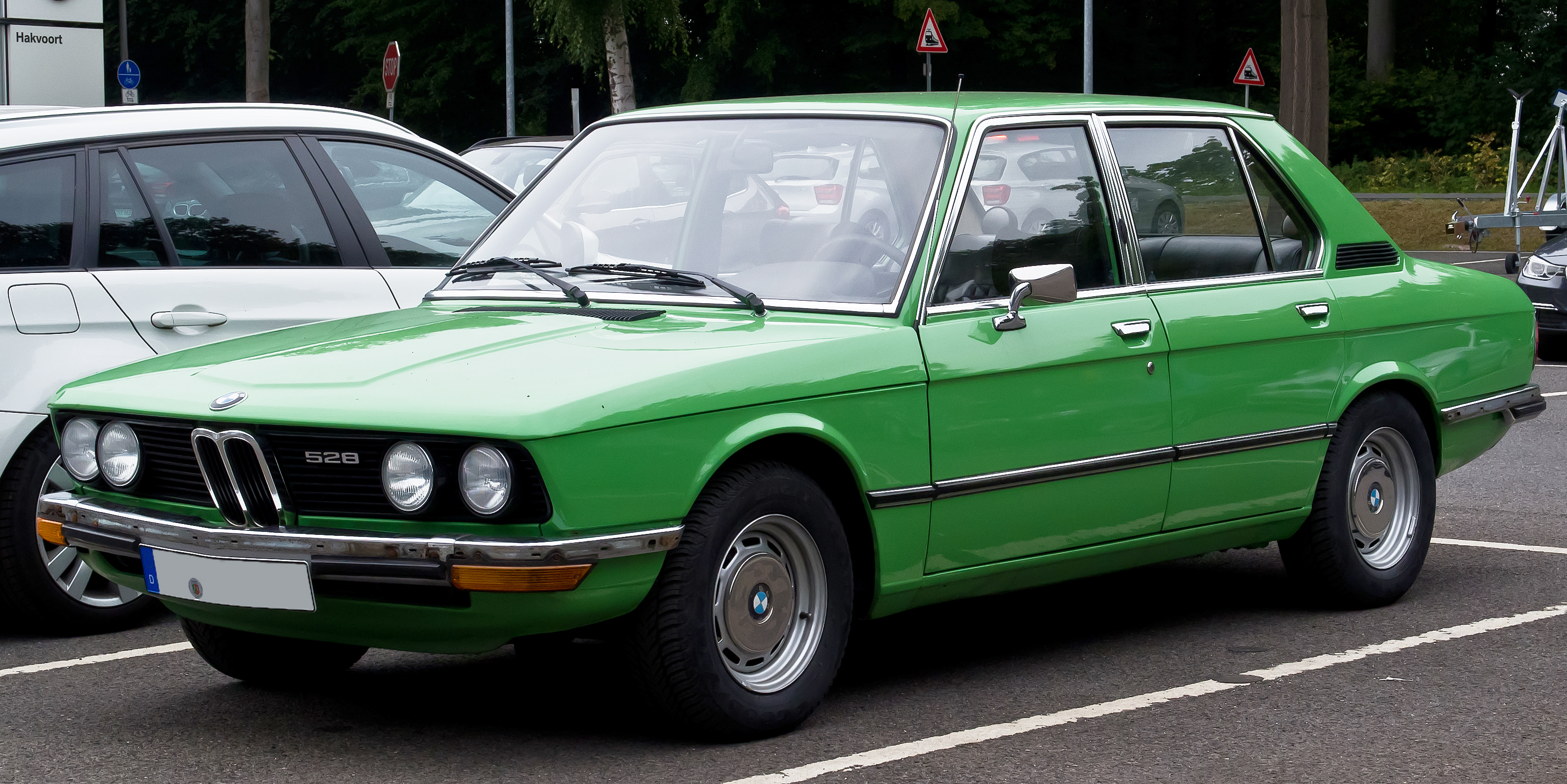
Pre-facelift front (six-cylinder)

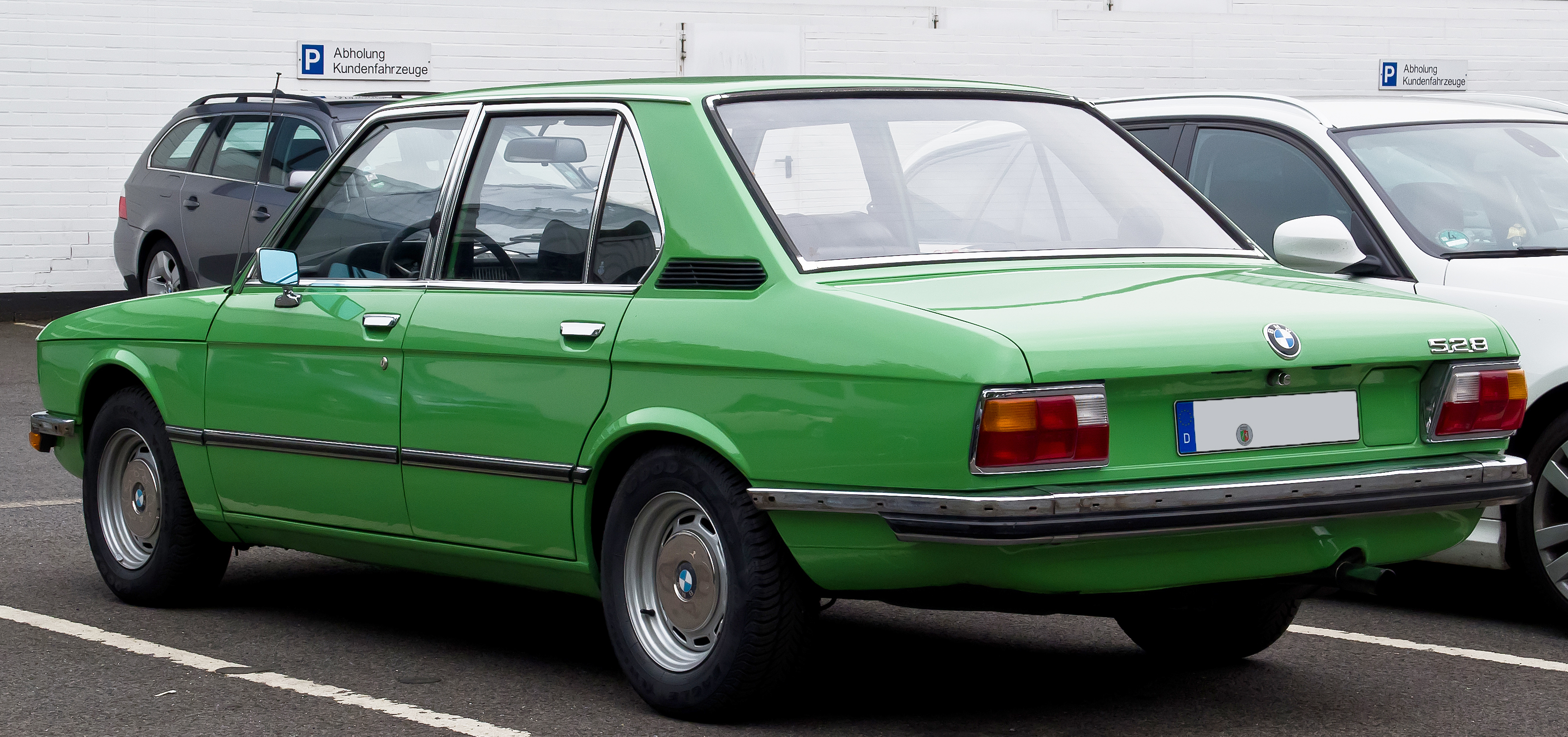
Pre-facelift rear

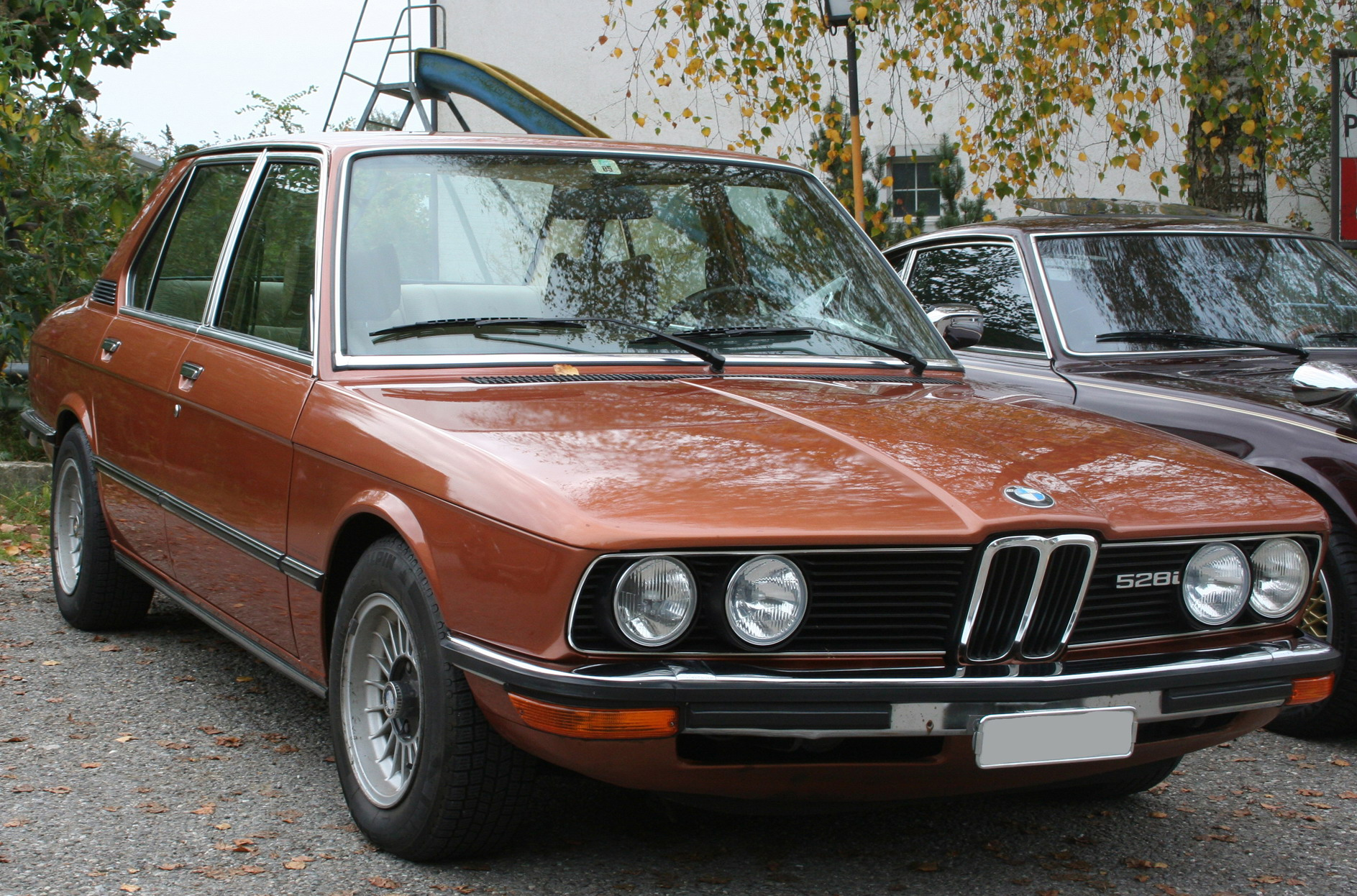
Post-facelift front

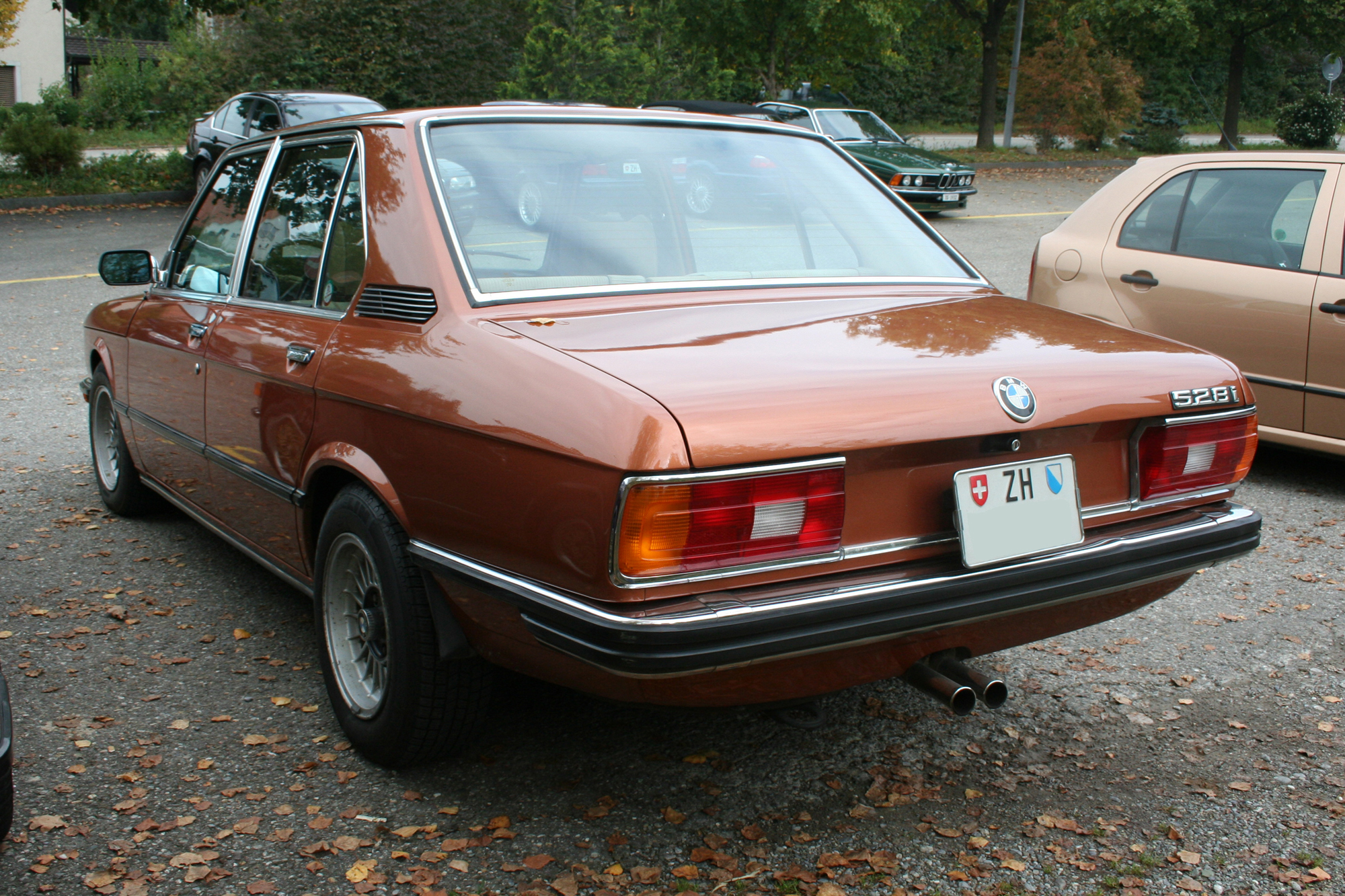
Post-facelift rear

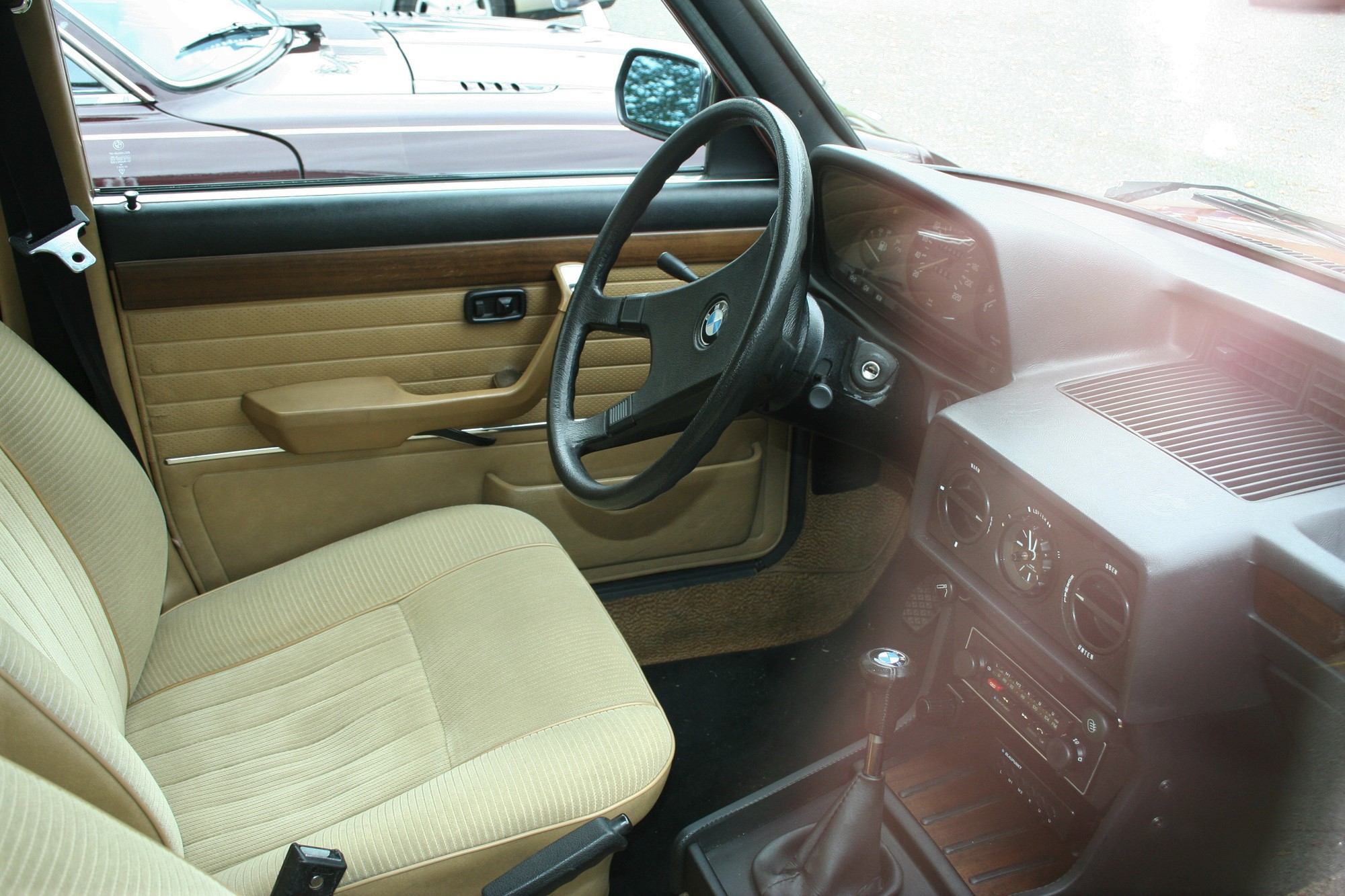
Interior Post-facelift 1976

1978

- The 528i model, using Bosch L-Jetronic fuel injection, begins production in July as a replacement for the carburetted 528 which was discontinued in September 1977.

1979

- 535i Motorsport available as special order only

1980

- M535i model introduced

== North American models ==
The North American market E12 differed in several ways from the original German market versions. Sales began with the 1975 model year, with the only model initially sold in the United States being the 530i, which was powered by a fuel-injected straight-six engine. In later years, North American-market E12s were positioned strictly as 'upscale' models and as such they were fitted with power windows, wood trim, and usually leather interiors and air conditioning as standard. The E12 5-series originally used a Behr air conditioner that was notorious for being too weak for American temperatures.

The American market imposed several restrictions such as bumper regulations, sealed-beam headlights, and emissions requirements. As such, American-market E12s were fitted with lower compression pistons, special larger bumpers designed to withstand a 5 mph (8 km/h) collision with no body damage, and fender-mounted front turn signals. The 5-mph bumpers increased weight, while the overall length was up by 206 mm (8.1 in). Emissions equipment such as EGR (Exhaust Gas Recirculation) and an air pump were used on the 530i, along with modified exhaust manifolds called Thermal Reactors. The latter caused several engine problems including burned exhaust valves and overheating, often resulting in warped or cracked cylinder heads. A separate defect in the 530i cylinder head design prompted a lawsuit against BMW. As a result, in 1980 BMW offered replacement cylinder heads for owners whose cylinder heads had cracked, even if the warranty on the car had expired.

For the 1979 model year, the 528i replaced the 530i for the American market. To reduce emissions, the thermal reactor and air pump system were replaced with a 3-way catalytic converter and the car's Bosch L-jetronic fuel injection system was now fitted with an exhaust gas oxygen sensor. Power was reduced by 5 kW (7 bhp), and the presence of the catalytic converter meant that unleaded gasoline (petrol) was required.

== South African models ==
In South Africa, the E12 was introduced in March 1974, imported fully knocked-down and assembled in Rosslyn by BMW South Africa with a separate VIN number (starting with ABM). The facelift model arrived a bit later than in Europe, in February 1977. Only a limited range of engines were available, to minimize costs and to help meet local parts requirements, with most engine options being the carburetted versions. In spite of widespread sanctions, locally built E12s also saw some export, the 520 being sent to Argentina and the 518 De Luxe to Belgium, Iran, and Italy.

To keep costs down, BMW chose to continue building the E12 in South Africa after the E28 had been introduced elsewhere, with the body now pressed and manufactured locally. Called the E12/8, this model received the new E28 interior and all fuel injected engines, tuned with fuel economy in mind. At the exterior, it received a chrome strip around the entire front grille. This model continued to be manufactured until September 1985, after which the next generation was finally introduced to South Africa. In total, 23,100 of the E12/8 were built; the models offered were the 518i, 520i, 528i, and M535i.

== Critical reception ==
While being commended for its acceleration and build-quality, Modern Motor criticised the 1978 528i for unpredictable handling and excessive body roll. Steering corrections during cornering meant the car's body "lurches back annoyingly and messily", in part due to the soft springing and hard damping combination. In comparison to the Jaguar XJ6 and Peugeot 604, the car was viewed as narrow and cramped in the rear and prone to wind noise.

== Production ==
Production of the E12 occurred from June 1972 to 1981, with a total of 699,094 cars produced. Initially, the cars were produced in Munich, West Germany. Following the opening of the new BMW Group Plant Dingolfing in September 1973, production was phased over to the Dingolfing plant.

Complete knock-down assembly of German-produced kits took place in Rosslyn, South Africa; Jakarta, Indonesia (by Gaya Motor); and Thailand.
