= BMW 7 Series (E23) =

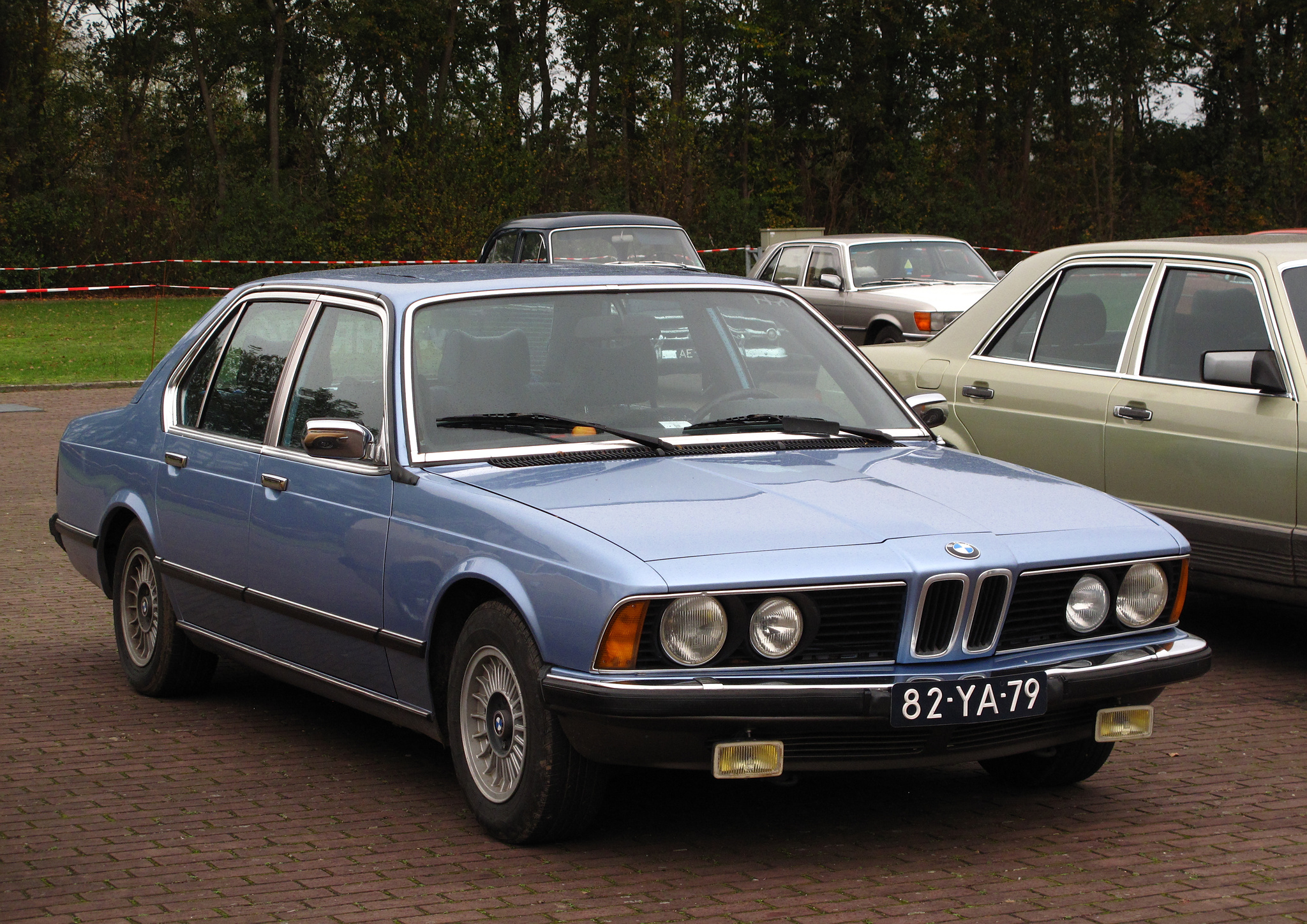

Overview
- Manufacturer: BMW
- Production: May 1977 – June 1986; 285,029 built
- Assembly: West Germany: Dingolfing; South Africa: Rosslyn, Gauteng
- Designer: Paul Bracq, Manfred Rennen

Body and chassis
- Class: Full-size luxury car (F)
- Body style: 4-door sedan/saloon
- Layout: FR layout

Powertrain
- Engine: 2.5–3.2 L M30 I6; 3.2 L M102 turbo I6; 3.4 L M106 turbo I6; 3.5 L M90 I6; 3.5 L M88/3 I6
- Transmission: 4-speed manual; 5-speed Getrag manual; 3-speed automatic; 4-speed automatic

Dimensions
- Wheelbase: 2,795 mm (110.0 in)
- Length: 4,860 mm (191.3 in); 5,014 mm (197.4 in) (US spec)
- Width: 1,800 mm (70.9 in)
- Height: 1,430 mm (56.3 in)
- Curb weight: 1,470–1,629 kg (3,241–3,591 lb)

Chronology
- Predecessor: BMW E3
- Successor: BMW 7 Series (E32)

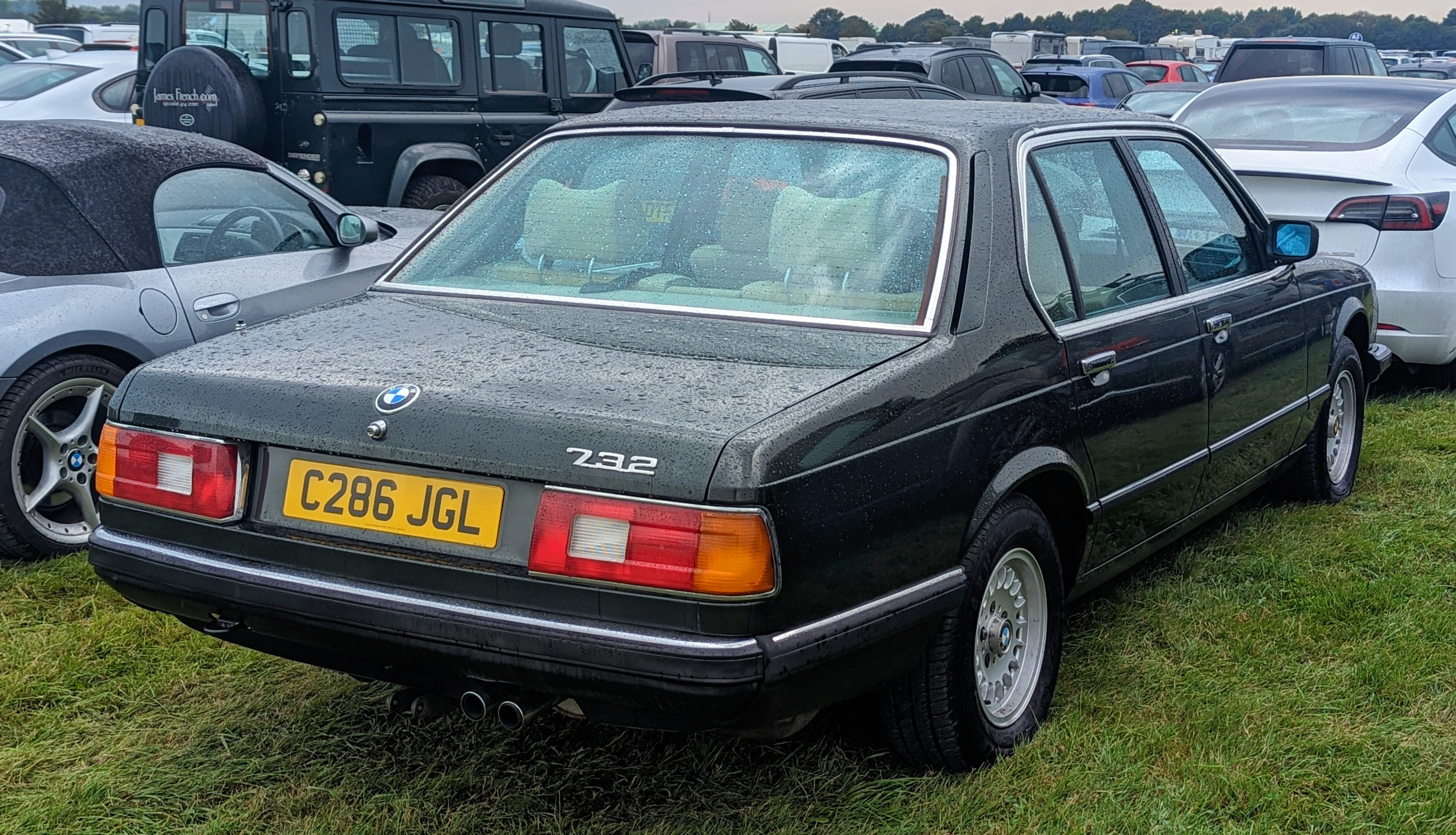
Rear view

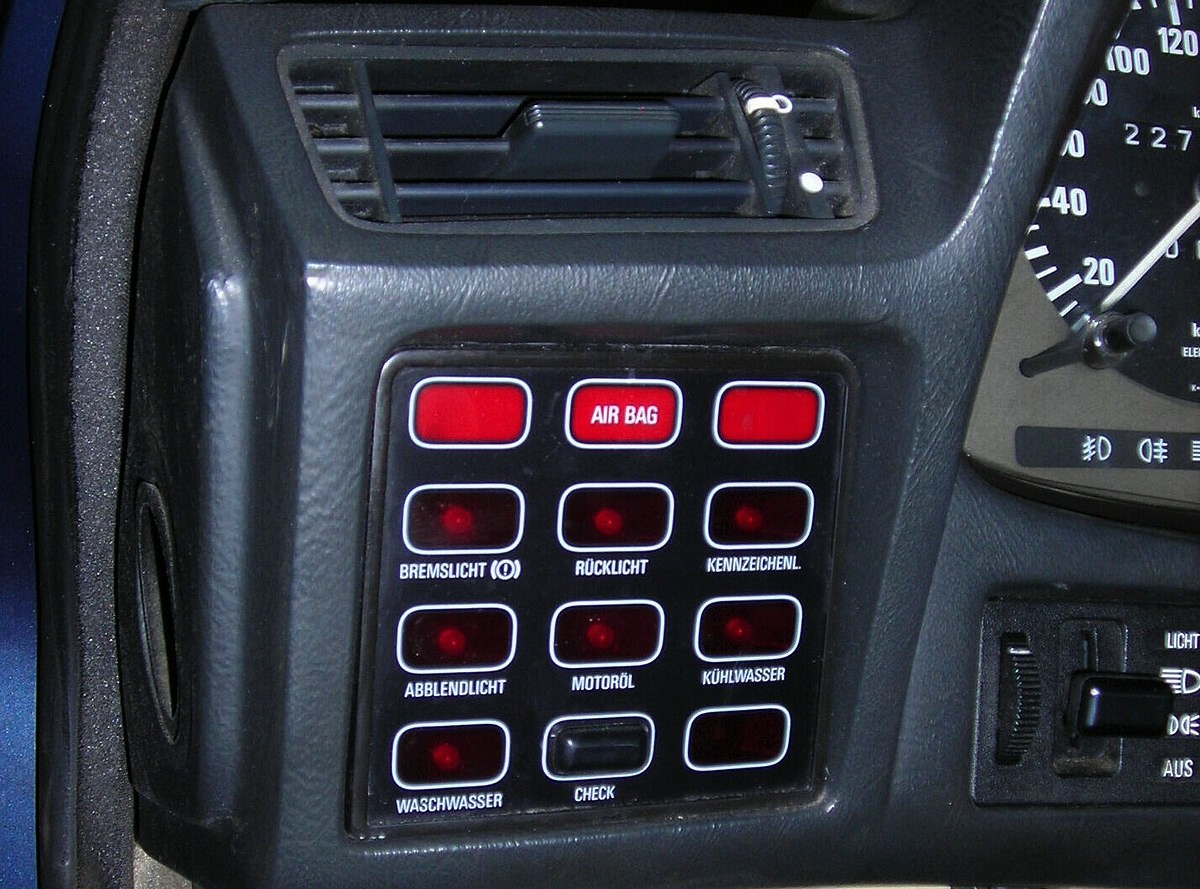
Check Control panel: query of operating fluids, function of the rear lights

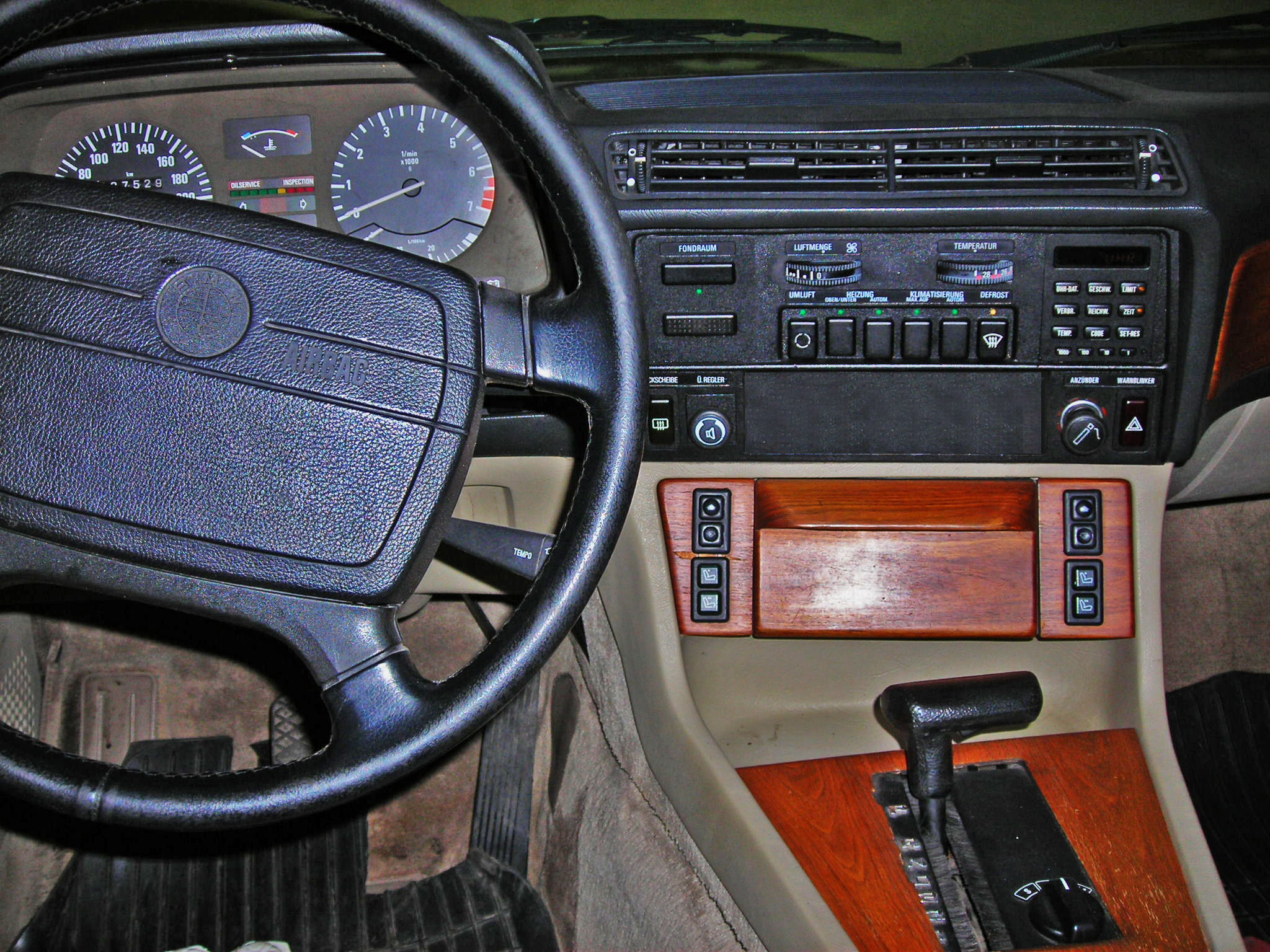
Interior, post facelift

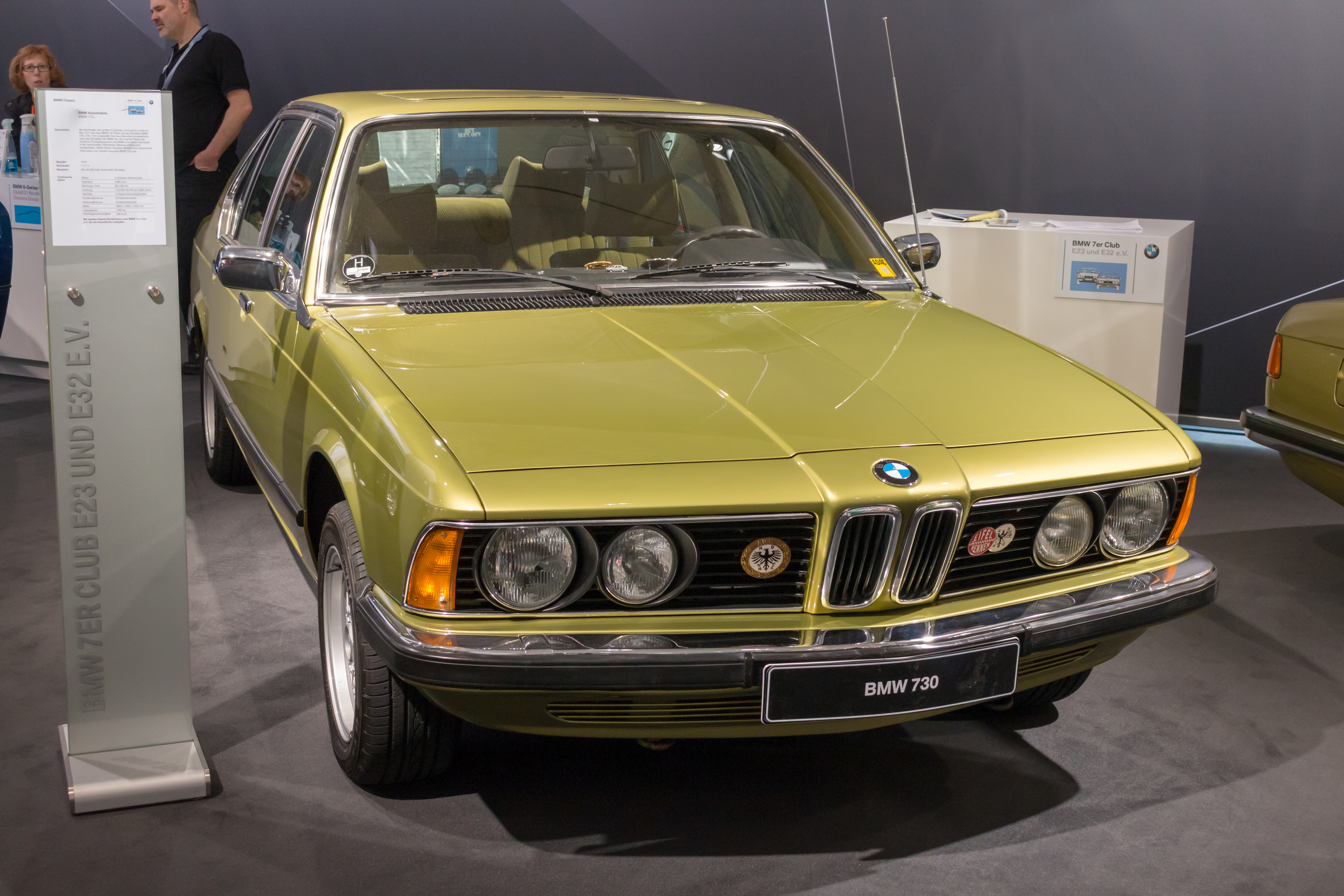
Pre-facelift with the first grille and earlier mirrors

The BMW E23 is the first generation of the BMW 7 Series luxury cars and was produced from 1977 until 1986. It was built in a 4-door sedan body style with 6-cylinder engines, to replace the BMW 'New Six' (E3) sedans. From 1983 until 1986, a turbocharged 6-cylinder engine was available.

In 1986, the E23 was replaced by the E32 7 Series, however, the E23 models (called L7) remained on sale in the United States until 1987.

The E23 introduced many electronic features for the first time in a BMW, including an on-board computer, service interval indicator, a "check control panel" (warning lights to indicate system faults to the driver), a dictaphone and complex climate control systems. It was also the first BMW to offer an anti-lock braking system (ABS), a driver's airbag (optional, starting in April 1985) and a new design of front suspension.

== Development and production ==
The initial styling concepts were developed under BMW Design Director Paul Bracq, with Manfred Rennen contributing with the exterior styling.

Production occurred from 1977 until 1986, during which time 285,029 cars were built.

== Engines ==
All models were powered by a straight-six petrol engine, with the majority of cars using the BMW M30 engine. Most engines were fuel-injected, however the 728 and 730 models of 1978–1979 used a Solex four-barrel carburetor. The fuel-injected models initially used the Bosch L-Jetronic system, until the 1979 732i, which was the first BMW to use the Bosch Motronic fuel-injection system.

Model	Years	Engine	Power	Torque	Notes
725i	1981–1986	2.5 L M30B25 injected	110 kW (150 PS) at 5,800 rpm	215 N⋅m (159 lb⋅ft) at 4,000 rpm	For government agencies, special order, and certain export markets only
728	1977–1979	2.8 L M30B28V carb	125 kW (170 PS) at 5,800 rpm	233 N⋅m (172 lb⋅ft) at 4,000 rpm	
728i	1979–1986	2.8 L M30B28 injected	135 kW (184 PS) at 5,800 rpm	240 N⋅m (177 lb⋅ft) at 4,200 rpm	
730	1977–1979	3.0 L M30B30V carb	135 kW (184 PS) at 5,800 rpm	255 N⋅m (188 lb⋅ft) at 3,500 rpm	
732i	1979–1986	3.2 L M30B32 injected	145 kW (197 PS) at 5,500 rpm	285 N⋅m (210 lb⋅ft) at 4,300 rpm	
733i (EU)	1977–1982	3.2 L M30B32 injected	145 kW (197 PS) at 5,500 rpm	279 N⋅m (206 lb⋅ft) at 4,300 rpm	
733i (US)	1978–1979	3.2 L M30B32 injected	132 kW (179 PS; 177 hp) at 5,500 rpm	266 N⋅m (196 lb⋅ft) at 4,000 rpm	United States & Japan only
733i (US)	1980–1981	3.2 L M30B32 injected	129 kW (175 PS; 173 hp) at 5,200 rpm	255 N⋅m (188 lb⋅ft) at 4,200 rpm	United States & Japan only
733i (US)	1982–1984	3.2 L M30B32 injected	135 kW (184 PS; 181 hp) at 6,000 rpm	264 N⋅m (195 lb⋅ft) at 4,000 rpm	United States & Japan only
735i (EU)	1979–1982	3.4 L M90 injected	160 kW (218 PS) at 5,200 rpm	304 N⋅m (224 lb⋅ft) at 4,000 rpm	
735i (EU)	1982–1986	3.4 L M30B34 injected	160 kW (218 PS) at 5,800 rpm	310 N⋅m (229 lb⋅ft) at 4,000 rpm	
735i (US), L7 (US)	1985–1987	3.4 L M30B34 injected	136 kW (185 PS; 182 hp) at 5,400 rpm	290 N⋅m (214 lb⋅ft) at 4,000 rpm	United States & Japan only
745i (EU)	1980–1982	3.2 L M102 turbo	185 kW (252 PS) at 5,200 rpm	380 N⋅m (280 lb⋅ft) at 2,600–4,000 rpm	
745i (EU)	1983–1986	3.4 L M106 turbo	185 kW (252 PS) at 4,700 rpm	380 N⋅m (280 lb⋅ft) at 2,200 rpm	
745i (SA)	1984–1986	3.5 L M88/3 injected	210 kW (286 PS) at 6,500 rpm	340 N⋅m (251 lb⋅ft) at 4,500 rpm	South Africa only

== Transmissions ==
The available transmissions consisted of:

- 4-speed manual
- 5-speed manual
- 3-speed automatic
- 4-speed automatic

== Equipment ==
Options included leather upholstery, wood trim, power seats, seat heaters, reclining rear seats, power windows, power mirrors, an in-car cellular telephone and rear-armrest radio controls (only with the executive and highline pack).

== Yearly changes ==
=== 1983 facelift ===
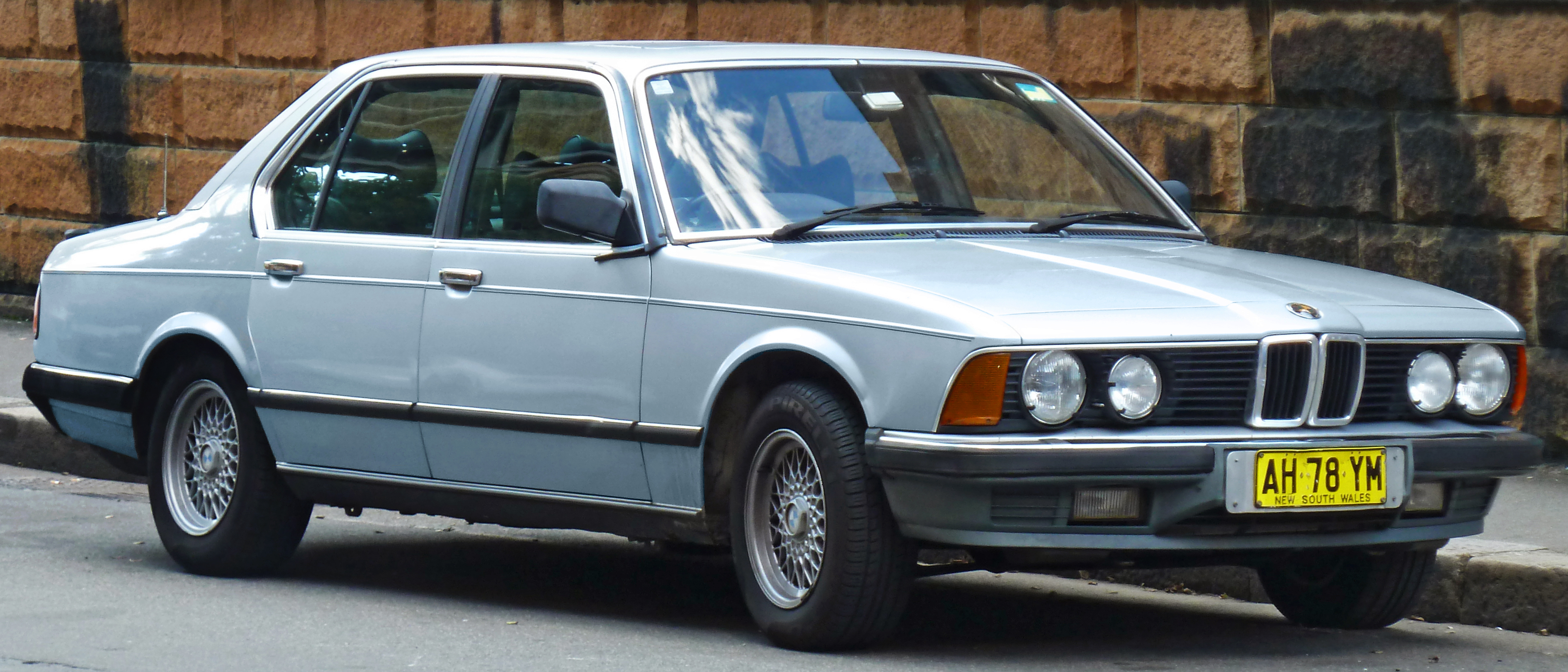
Post-facelift model with revised grille and black mirrors

The 1983 model year facelift (produced from September 1982) included styling changes to the front of the car: wider and more angular 'kidney' grilles, valance/spoiler, bumper bars, etc. Inside the car, the dashboard and instrument panels were also updated. The rear suspension was updated and the 735i engine changed from the M90 to the M30B34.

=== 1984 ===
In the US, 1984 saw the arrival of the optional 4-speed automatic transmission (replacing the 3-speed unit previously offered), wood trim replacing the plastic above the glove compartment and on the ashtray and electrically adjustable power seats. Michelin TRX tyres (requiring special metric wheels) became available as an option on the 5-speed manual models.

== Special models ==
=== 725i ===
The 725i model was not officially sold but produced for West German government agencies which, at the time, were not allowed to have engines larger than 2.5 liter in official cars. In the Netherlands, 2/3 of the government ministers had 725i's as their car of choice, because it just stayed under the maximum budget where the 728i was definitely over it. In total, 921 units were produced.

=== Turbocharged 745i ===
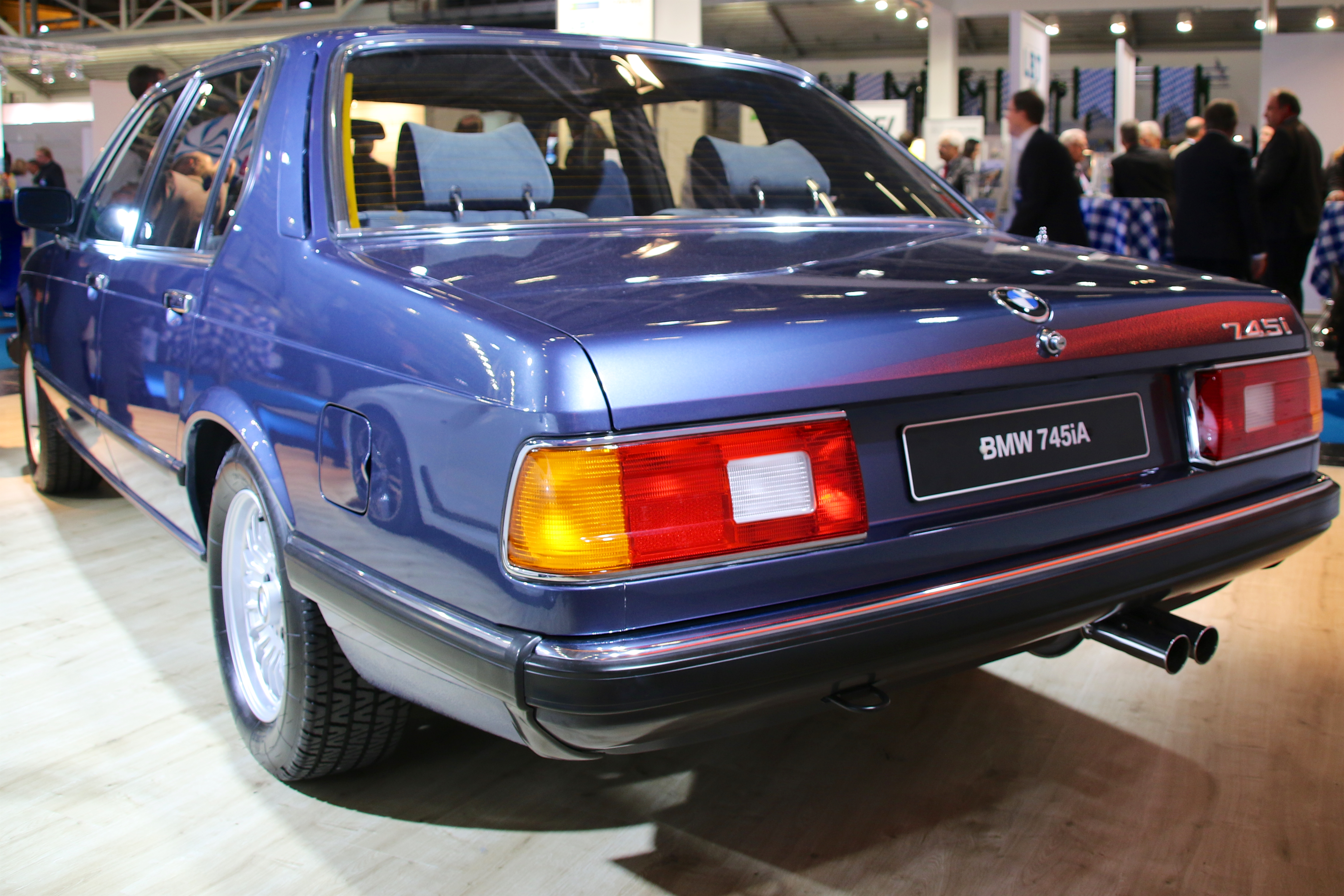
745i model- rear view

The 745i was a high-performance model sold in left-hand-drive European markets from 1979 to 1986. It was initially powered by the M102 engine, which is a turbocharged 3.2 L version of the M30 straight-six engine, producing 185 kW (248 hp; 252 PS) at 60 kPa (9 psi) of boost. In 1982, the engine was upgraded to the M106, which increased the capacity to 3.4 litres and the fuel injection system changed from Jetronic to Motronic. Boost pressure was reduced to 40 kPa (6 psi), however power output was unchanged.

All M102 cars were built with a 3-speed ZF 3HP22 automatic transmission. All M106 cars were built with a 4-speed ZF 4HP22 automatic transmission. Options included heated front and rear power reclining seats, gasoline fired heater, leather covered cellular telephone, rear-armrest radio control, water buffalo hide upholstery, and burl wood trim.

The name 745i comes from the theoretical assumption that turbocharged engines have approximately 1.4 times more power than naturally aspirated engines. By this assumption, a 3.2 litres (3,205 cc) turbocharged engine would have similar power to a 4.5 litres (4,487 cc) naturally aspirated engine.

=== South African 745i ===
The South African 745i model was powered by the naturally aspirated M88/3 engine, instead of the turbocharged M102/M106 engines of the European 745i. A right-hand-drive version of the turbocharged model was not possible due to the turbocharger being located in the right-hand side of the engine bay. Instead, the 745i was fitted with the 210 kW (280 hp; 290 PS) BMW M88 engine, as used in the E24 M635i and E28 M5. The engine uses a 24-valve DOHC valvetrain and the fuel injection system is Bosch ML-Jetronic.

A production run of 192 South African 745i was built from 1983 to 1987, 175 of which were with an automatic gearbox and 17 with a 5-speed manual gearbox.

BMW South Africa entered one of these 745i models in Class A of the South African Modified Saloon Car Championship The 745i won the championship in 1985, the only BMW-Sanctioned motorsport application in the history of BMW 7 Series cars.

== United States and Japanese market models ==
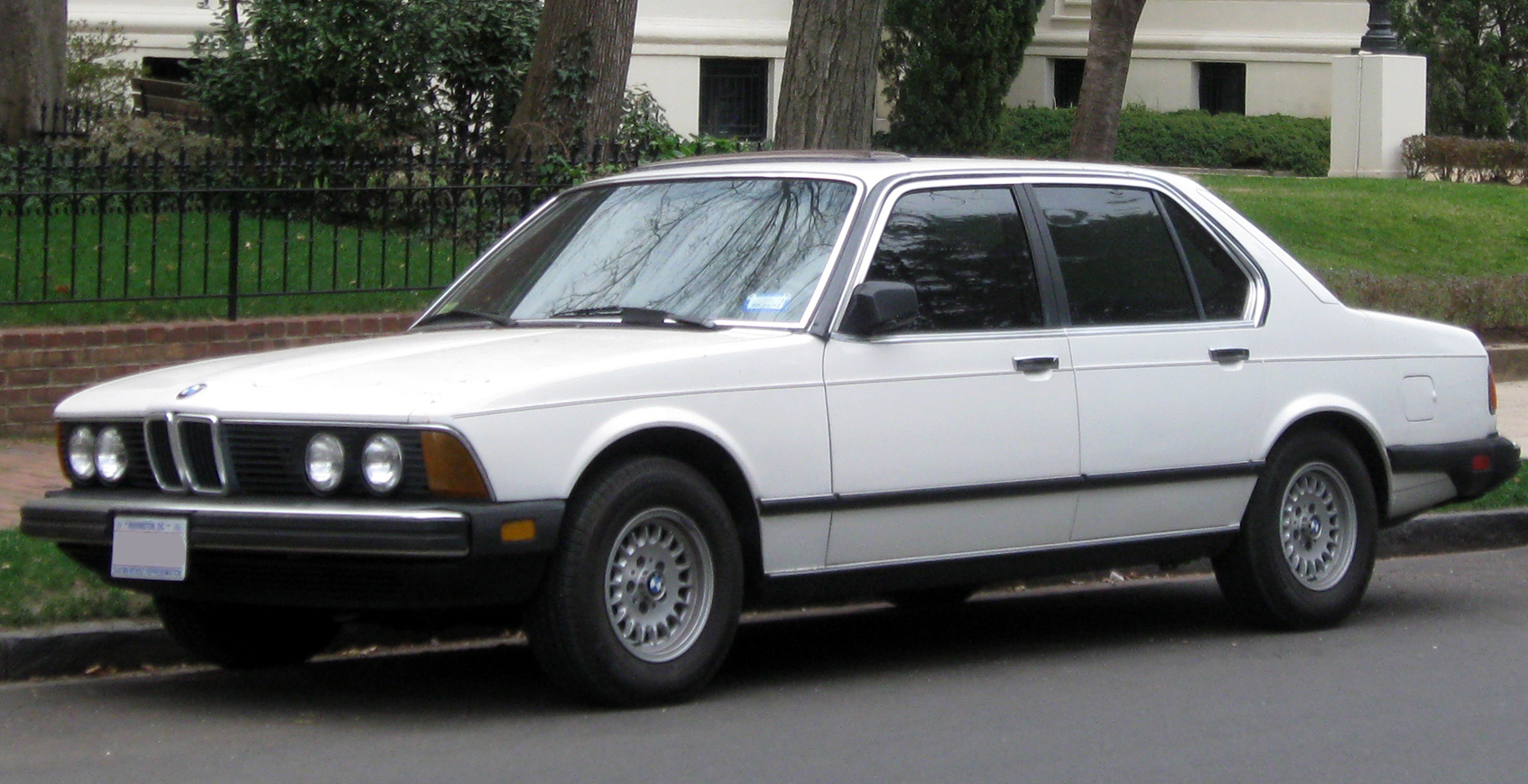
E23 in U.S.

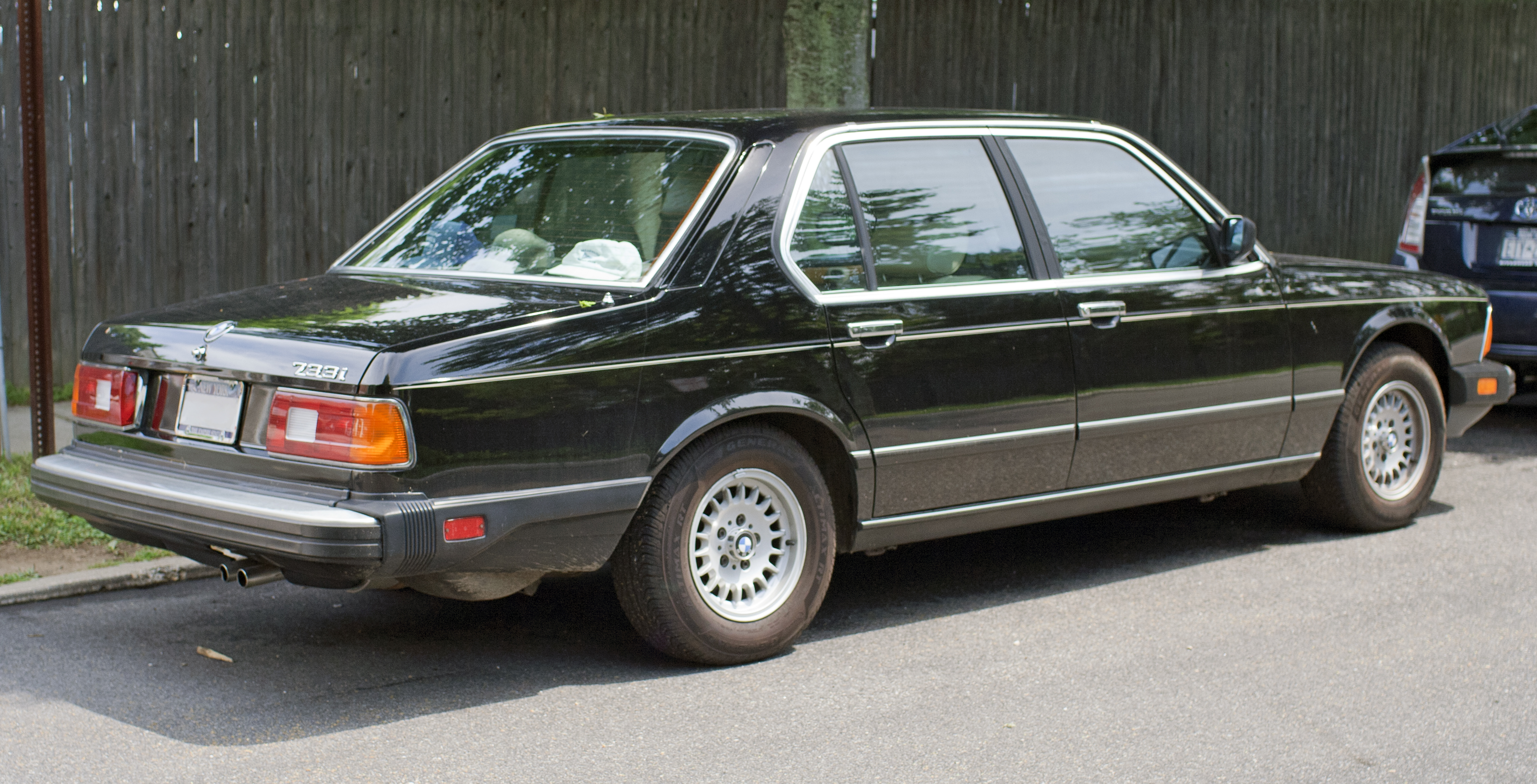
U.S. model rear, including elongated bumpers

Only the 733i, 735i, and L7 models were sold in the United States and Japan. These markets also received only upscale versions, usually including leather upholstery, cruise control, wood trim, power windows, power sunroof, and other options as standard.

North American versions were fitted with larger bumpers (to comply with the U.S. National Highway Traffic Safety Administration (NHTSA) standards), smaller sealed beam headlights, and various forms of emissions equipment that were not found on European-market cars. The engines used in these markets had lower-compression pistons and thus were less powerful than European-market versions. Some features such as ABS were available in markets outside North America before they were fitted on American models.

The L7 was a more luxurious version of the 735i for the American market only. It featured special leather upholstery with leather dashboard and door padding (rather than wood trim), a power glass Moonroof, and a variety of optional features as standard. All L7 models were built with automatic transmissions and a standard driver's air bag.

== In popular culture ==
In the Netflix show Stranger Things the character Steve Harrington drives a burgundy 1983 BMW 733i
