= BMW M30 =

BMW M30 engine
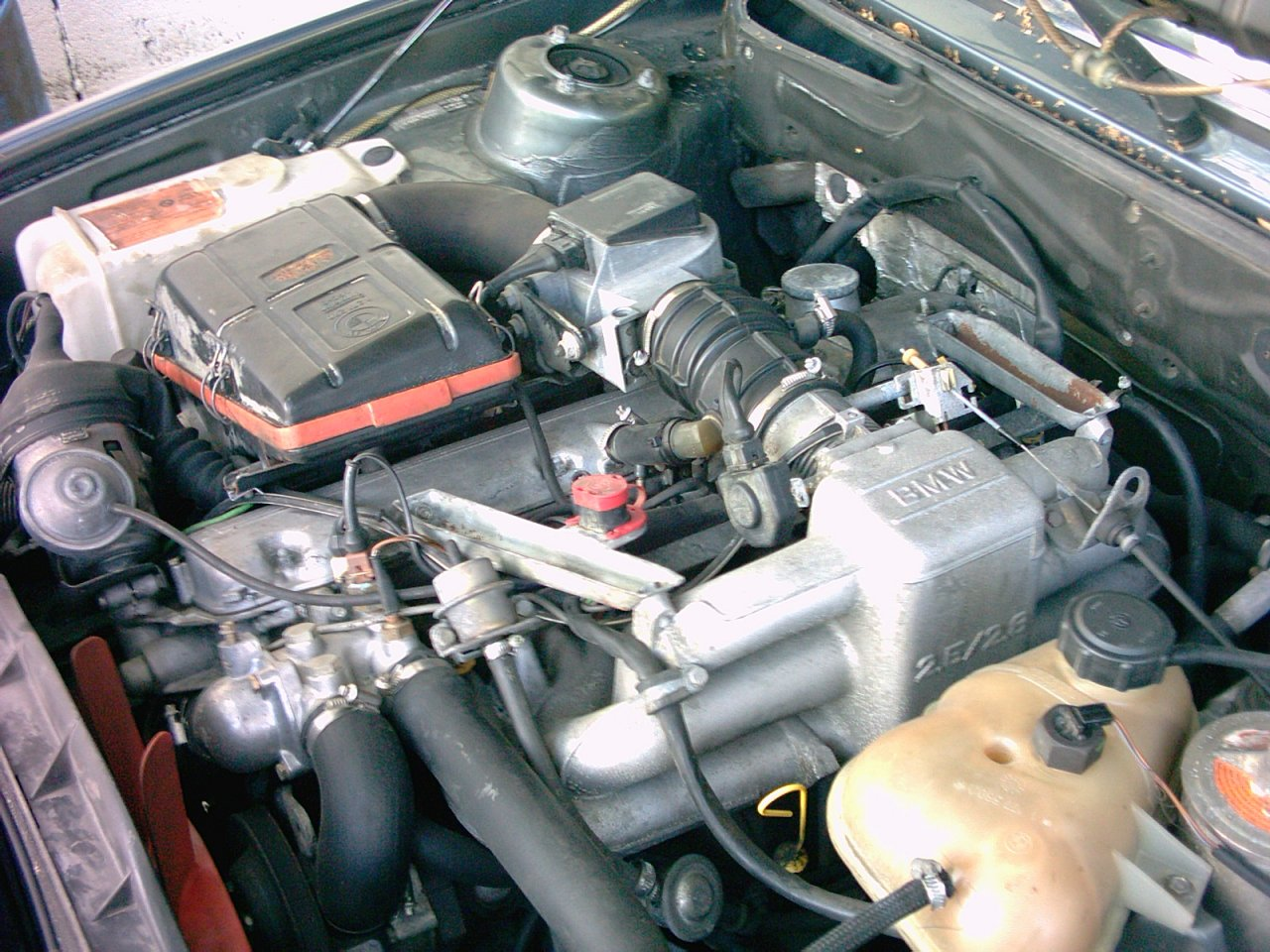

Overview
- Production: 1968–1995

Layout
- Configuration: Straight-6
- Displacement: 2,494 cc (152 cu in); 2,788 cc (170 cu in); 2,986 cc (182 cu in); 3,210 cc (196 cu in); 3,295 cc (201 cu in); 3,430 cc (209 cu in)
- Cylinder bore: 86.0 mm (3.4 in); 89.0 mm (3.5 in); 92.0 mm (3.6 in)
- Piston stroke: 71.6 mm (2.8 in); 80.0 mm (3.1 in); 86.0 mm (3.4 in); 88.0 mm (3.5 in)
- Cylinder block material: Cast iron
- Cylinder head material: Aluminium
- Valvetrain: SOHC

Combustion
- Fuel type: Petrol

Chronology
- Predecessor: BMW M20
- Successor: BMW M50 and M60

The BMW M30 is a SOHC straight-six petrol engine which was produced from 1968 to 1995. With a production run of 27 years, it is BMW's longest produced engine and was used in many car models.

The first models to use the M30 engine were the BMW 2500 and 2800 sedans and the 2800 CS coupe, which entered production in 1968. The initial M30 models were produced in displacements of 2.5 litres (2,494 cc) and 2.8 litres (2,788 cc). Larger displacement versions were introduced over time, with the largest version being 3,430 cc (209.3 cu in), which was sometimes badged as "3.5 litres". As per the BMW M10 four-cylinder engine from which the M30 was developed, the M30 has an iron block, an aluminium head and an overhead camshaft with two valves per cylinder.

The engine was given the nicknames of 'Big Six' and 'Senior Six', following the introduction of the smaller BMW M20 straight-six engine in the late 1970s. The M30 was produced alongside the M20 throughout the M20's production, and prior to the introduction of the BMW M70 V12 engine in 1987, the M30 was BMW's most powerful and largest regular production engine.

Following the introduction of the BMW M50 engine in 1990, the M30 began to be phased out.

Ward's have rated the M30 as one of the "Top Engines of the 20th Century".

== Design ==
The M30 was originally developed in the late 1960s, loosely based on the BMW M10 four-cylinder engine first used in the BMW New Class sedans and coupes. Initially, the engine code was "M06" and the "M68", until all versions began to use the "M30" prefix in 1981.

Common features between the M10 and M30 include a profile lowering 30-degree slant to the right, a crossflow cylinder head, and chain-driven camshaft with rocker arm valve actuation. Further similarities include a cast-iron block with an aluminium head and a forged crankshaft. The first two M30 engines introduced were the 2.5 L (2,494 cc) and the 2.8 L (2,788 cc) versions, which both used an 86 mm (3.39 in) bore.

== M30B35LE/M90 engine ==
The M30B35LE engine, also called the M90, was used in several models from 1979-1982. It combines the block from the motorsports BMW M88 DOHC engine with the M30's SOHC cylinder head.

== Versions ==
Version	Displacement	Power output	Torque	Year
M30B25V	2,494 cc (152.2 cu in)	110 kW (150 PS; 148 bhp) at 6,000 rpm	211 N⋅m (156 lb⋅ft) at 3,700 rpm	1968
M30B25	2,494 cc (152.2 cu in)	110 kW (150 PS; 148 bhp) at 6,000 rpm	215 N⋅m (159 lb⋅ft) at 3,700 rpm	1981
M30B28V	2,788 cc (170.1 cu in)	125 kW (170 PS; 168 bhp) at 6,000 rpm	235 N⋅m (173 lb⋅ft) at 3,700	1968
M30B28	2,788 cc (170.1 cu in)	135 kW (184 PS; 181 bhp) at 5,800 rpm	240 N⋅m (177 lb⋅ft) at 4,200 rpm	1977
M30B30V	2,986 cc (182.2 cu in)	132 kW (180 PS; 178 bhp) at 6,000 rpm	255 N⋅m (188 lb⋅ft) at 3,700 rpm	1971
M30B30	2,986 cc (182.2 cu in)	147 kW (200 PS; 197 bhp) at 5,500 rpm	272 N⋅m (201 lb⋅ft) at 4,300 rpm	1971
M30B32	3,210 cc (195.9 cu in)	147 kW (200 PS; 197 bhp) at 5,500 rpm	285 N⋅m (210 lb⋅ft) at 4,300 rpm	1976
M30B33V	3,295 cc (201.1 cu in)	140 kW (190 PS; 188 bhp) at 5,500 rpm	289 N⋅m (213 lb⋅ft) at 3,500 rpm	1973
M30B34	3,430 cc (209.3 cu in)	160 kW (218 PS; 215 bhp) at 5,800 rpm	310 N⋅m (229 lb⋅ft) at 4,200 rpm	1982
M30B35	3,430 cc (209.3 cu in)	155 kW (211 PS; 208 bhp) at 5,700 rpm	305 N⋅m (225 lb⋅ft) at 4,000 rpm	1988

=== M30B25V ===
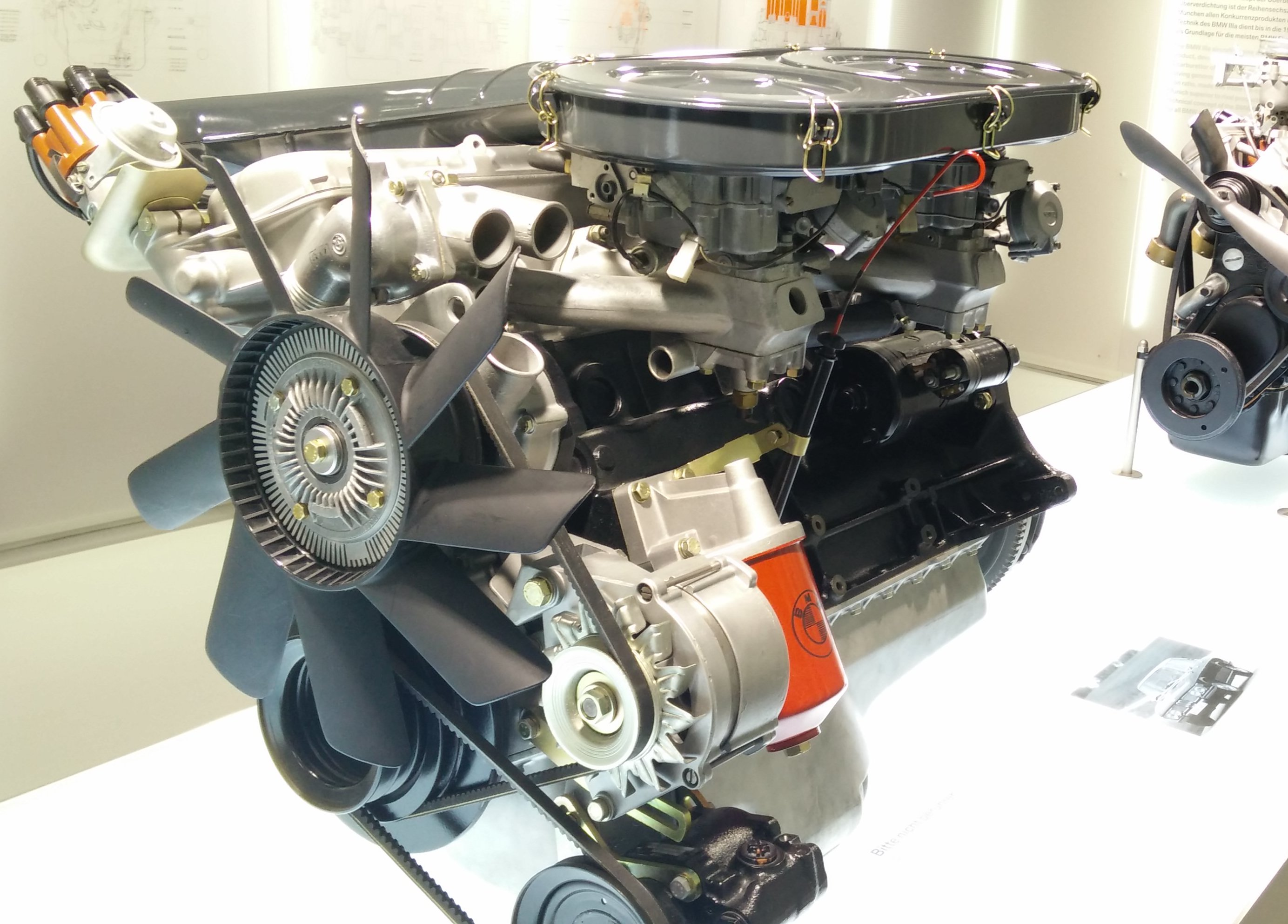
BMW M30 with carburettor in BMW Museum

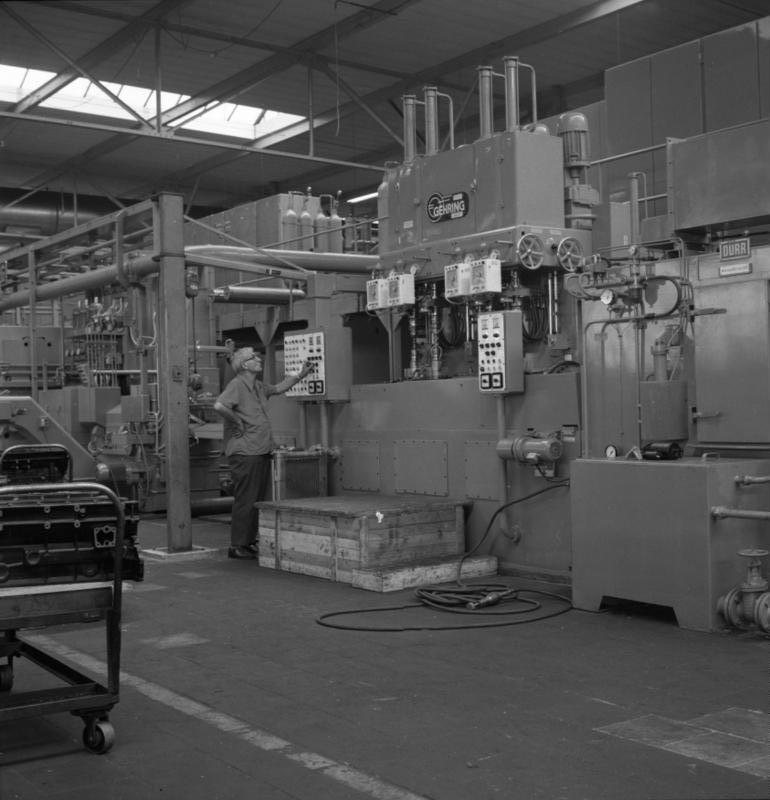
M30 production in Munich

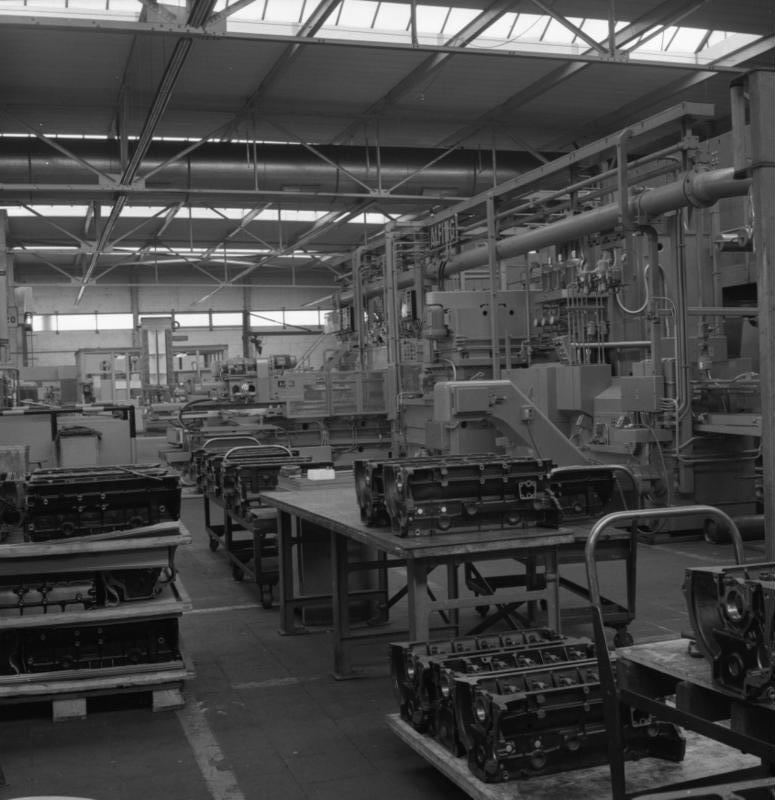
M30 production in Munich

The first 2,494 cc (152.2 cu in) version of the M30 was introduced in the 1968 E3 2500. This version uses dual Solex Zenith 35/40 INAT carburettors, has a compression ratio of 9.0:1 and produces 110 kW (150 PS; 148 bhp) in most applications. It has a bore of 86 mm (3.39 in) and a stroke of 71.6 mm (2.82 in).

The M30B25 has previously been called the M06 and M68, prior to BMW retroactively renaming it the M30B25V (V for Vergaser- carburettor in German).

Applications:

- 1968–1977 E3 2500
- 1974–1975 E9 2.5 CS
- 1973–1976 E12 525 — 107 kW (145 PS; 143 hp), Solex 4A1 carburettor
- 1976–1981 E12 525

=== M30B25 ===
In 1981, Bosch L-Jetronic electronic fuel injection was added to the 2,494 cc (152.2 cu in) version. Peak power remained unchanged at 110 kW (148 bhp), however torque increased slightly to 215 N⋅m (159 lb⋅ft).

Applications:

- 1981-1987 E28 525i
- 1981-1986 E23 725i

=== M30B28V ===
In its original form, the carburetted 2.8 used two Solex Zenith "35/40 INAT" carburetors, the compression ratio is 9.0:1 and the engine produces 125 kW (170 PS; 168 hp) and 235 N⋅m (174 lb⋅ft). The specifications went on to vary depending on the model year, carburettor and country. The bore is 86 mm (3.39 in) and the stroke is 80 mm (3.15 in).

This version has also been known as the M06 and M68, prior to BMW renaming it the M30B28V.

Applications:

- 1968-1977 E3 2800 / 2.8L — 125 kW (170 PS; 168 hp)
- 1968-1971 E9 2800 CS — 125 kW (170 PS; 168 bhp)
- 1971-1971 E3 Bavaria — 125 kW (168 hp), United States only
- 1974-1976 E12 528 — 121 kW (165 PS; 163 hp) dual Zenith INAT carburettors
- 1976-1978 E12 528 — 125 kW (170 PS; 168 bhp), Solex 4A1 carburettor
- 1977-1979 E23 728 — 125 kW (170 PS; 168 bhp), Solex 4A1 carburettor

=== M30B28 ===
In 1977, Bosch L-Jetronic electronic fuel injection was added to the 2,788 cc (170.1 cu in) version. Power increased to 135 kW (181 bhp) and torque increased to 240 N⋅m (177 lb⋅ft).

- 1977-1978 E12 528i — North America only, 129 kW (173 bhp), 9.0:1 compression ratio
- 1978-1981 E12 528i — 130 kW (177 PS; 175 hp)
- 1979-1986 E23 728i
- 1979-1987 E24 628CSi
- 1981-1987 E28 528i

=== M30B30V ===
Based on the M30B28V version with a 3 mm (0.12 in) larger bore, the M30B30V produces 132 kW (180 PS; 178 bhp) and 255 N⋅m (188 lb⋅ft), uses dual Zenith 35/40 INAT carburettors and has a compression ratio of 9.0:1. In United States trim, this engine produced 127 kW (170 hp) at 5800 rpm.

Applications:

- 1971-1975 E9 3.0 CS
- 1971-1972 E9 3.0 CSL
- 1971-1974 E3 3.0 S / 3.0 L / Bavaria
- 1976-1979 E24 630 CS — 136 kW (185 PS; 182 bhp), Pierburg 4A1 carburetor
- 1977-1979 E23 730 — 135 kW (184 PS; 181 bhp), Solex 4 A 1 carburettor

=== M30B30 ===
The fuel injected version of the 2,986 cc (182.2 cu in) M30 debuted in 1971 in the E9 3.0 CSi and initially used the Bosch D-Jetronic mechanical fuel injection system. In 1976, the fuel injection system was upgraded to Bosch L-Jetronic electronic fuel injection. The M30B30 produces up to 147 kW (200 PS; 197 bhp) and 272 N⋅m (200 lb⋅ft), depending on the model year and whether a catalytic converter is fitted. The compression ratio is 9.2:1. With catalytic converter, compression ratio is 9:1.

Applications:

- 1971-1975 E9 3.0 CSi — 147 kW (200 PS; 197 bhp)
- 1972-1973 E9 3.0 CSL — 147 kW (200 PS; 197 bhp)
- 1972-1975 E3 3.0 Si — 147 kW (197 bhp)
- 1975-1978 E12 530i — North America only, 131 kW (176 bhp)
- 1976-1976 E12 530 MLE — South Africa only, 147 kW (197 bhp)
- 1977-1978 E24 630CSi — North America only, 129 kW (173 bhp)
- 1986-1995 E32 730i — 138 kW (185 bhp)
- 1988-1990 E34 530i — 138 kW (185 bhp)

=== M30B32 ===
Despite having a capacity of 3,210 cc (195.9 cu in), this engine appeared in many cars badged so as to suggest 3.3 L (201 cu in) of displacement- such as the 633i, 3.3 Li, and 733i. The compression ratio is 8.8:1. In the E24 633CSi coupe, the M30B32 uses Bosch L-Jetronic electronic fuel injection. The US version used L-Jetronic from 1978 until mid-1981, changing over to Motronic digital fuel injection in June of that year. The 1979 732i is BMW's first use of Bosch's Motronic fuel injection. The bore is 89 mm (3.50 in) and the stroke is 86 mm (3.39 in).

Applications:

- 1973-1975 E9 3.0 CSL — 152 kW (206 PS; 203 hp), 3,153 cc (192.4 cu in)
- 1976-1984 E24 633CSi — 145 or 147 kW (197 or 200 PS; 194 or 197 bhp) in Euro spec, 128–130 kW (172–174 bhp) in USA spec
- 1976-1979 E3 3.3 Li — 147 kW (200 PS; 197 bhp)
- 1977-1984 E23 733i — 147 kW (200 PS; 197 bhp) in Euro spec, 130–145 kW (174–194 bhp) in USA spec
- 1979-1981 E12 533i — North America only, 135 kW (181 bhp)
- 1979-1986 E23 732i — 144 kW (196 PS; 193 bhp)
- 1982-1984 E28 533i — North America only, 135 kW (181 hp; 184 PS)
- 1984-1986 E30 333i — South Africa only, 145 kW (194 hp; 197 PS), special ALPINA Intake plenum and exhaust manifold, modified L-Jetronic Injection. Only 210 (including six test cars) were produced for local Group 1 homologation.

=== M30B33V ===
The carburetted M30B33 produces 140 kW (190 PS; 187 bhp) and 289 N⋅m (213 lb⋅ft). It has a bore of 89 mm (3.50 in) and a stroke of 88 mm (3.46 in).

Applications:

- 1973-1975 E3 3.3 L

=== M30B34 ===
The M30B34 engines sold in Europe and most other markets used a 10.0:1 compression ratio and produced 160 kW (218 PS; 215 hp). In North America and Japan, the M30B34 used an 8.0:1 compression ratio and produced 136 kW (185 PS; 182 hp). This engine was also offered in Europe from the latter half of 1985 until mid-1987. In all markets, the Bosch Motronic digital fuel injection system was used. The bore is 92 mm (3.62 in) and the stroke is 86 mm (3.39 in).

Applications:

- 1982-1987 E23 735i / L7
- 1982-1987 E24 635CSi / L6 — 218 PS (160 kW) in Euro spec
- 1985-1988 E28 535i / 535is / M535i

=== M30B35 ===
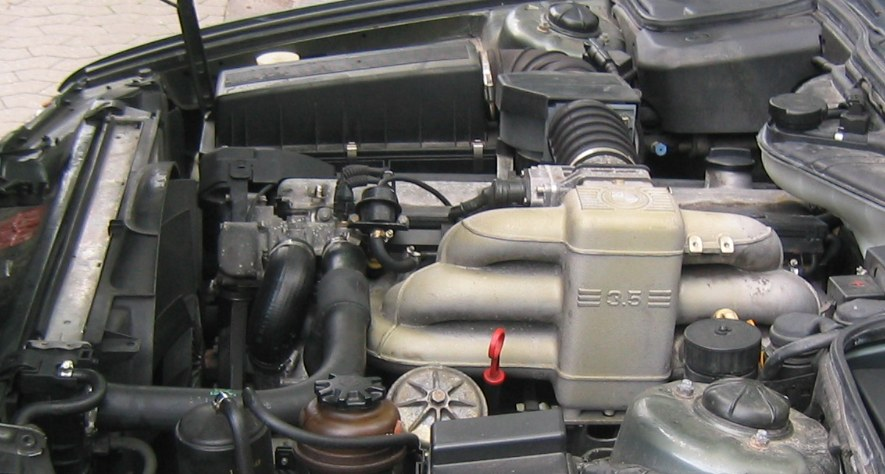
M30B35

This engine has a capacity of 3,430 cc (209.3 cu in), despite the "B35" model code. It produces 155 kW (211 PS; 208 hp) at 5700 rpm and 305 N⋅m (225 lb⋅ft) at 4000 rpm, has a compression ratio of 9.0:1 and uses Bosch Motronic 1.3 digital fuel injection. It was also offered without a catalytic converter for certain markets; this version produces 162 kW (220 PS; 217 hp) and 315 N⋅m (232 lb⋅ft) at the same engine speeds.

Applications:

- 1988-1989 E24 635CSi
- 1986-1992 E32 735i
- 1987-1992 E34 535i
- 1988-1989 Rayton Fissore Magnum 3.5

== Turbocharging ==
The M30 was the basis for the turbocharged M102 and M106 engines.

The Alpina B10 Biturbo used a modified version of the M30, with two turbochargers and forged pistons. Producing 265 kW (360 PS; 355 bhp) at 6000 rpm and 520 N⋅m (384 lb⋅ft) at 4000 rpm, the engine made this car the fastest sedan in the world. The final 50 M30 blocks were shipped to Alpina for use in the final 50 B10 Biturbos.

=== M102 ===
The M102 was produced from 1980 to 1982. It was BMW's first turbocharged six-cylinder engine.

The M102 (also known as M30B32LAE) has a displacement of 3,210 cc (195.9 cu in). The KKK K27 turbocharger produces 9 psi (0.62 bar) of boost and an air-to-air intercooler is used. The compression ratio is 7.0:1.

The M102 produces 188 kW (256 PS; 252 bhp) and was used in the E23 7 Series, in the model was designated "745i". The M102 was not available in right-hand drive cars, leading to the South African 745i using the BMW M88 naturally aspirated DOHC straight-six engine instead.

Applications:

- 1980–1982 E23 745i

=== M106 ===
The M106 (also called M30B34MAE) replaced the M102 and was produced from 1982 to 1986.

Some of the M106's upgrades over its predecessor are a result of the M30B34 version of the M30, which was also released in 1982. These upgrades include Bosch Motronic engine management and an increased displacement to 3,430 cc (209.3 cu in). The compression ratio was increased from 7.0:1 to 8.0:1.

Peak power output is the same 185 kW (252 PS; 248 bhp) as the M102, however it occurs at lower RPM and peak boost is reduced from 9 to 6 psi (0.62 to 0.41 bar).

There was no direct successor to the M106, however BMW's next turbocharged petrol engine was the BMW N54, introduced in 2006.

Applications:

- 1982–1986 E23 745i

== Motorsport ==
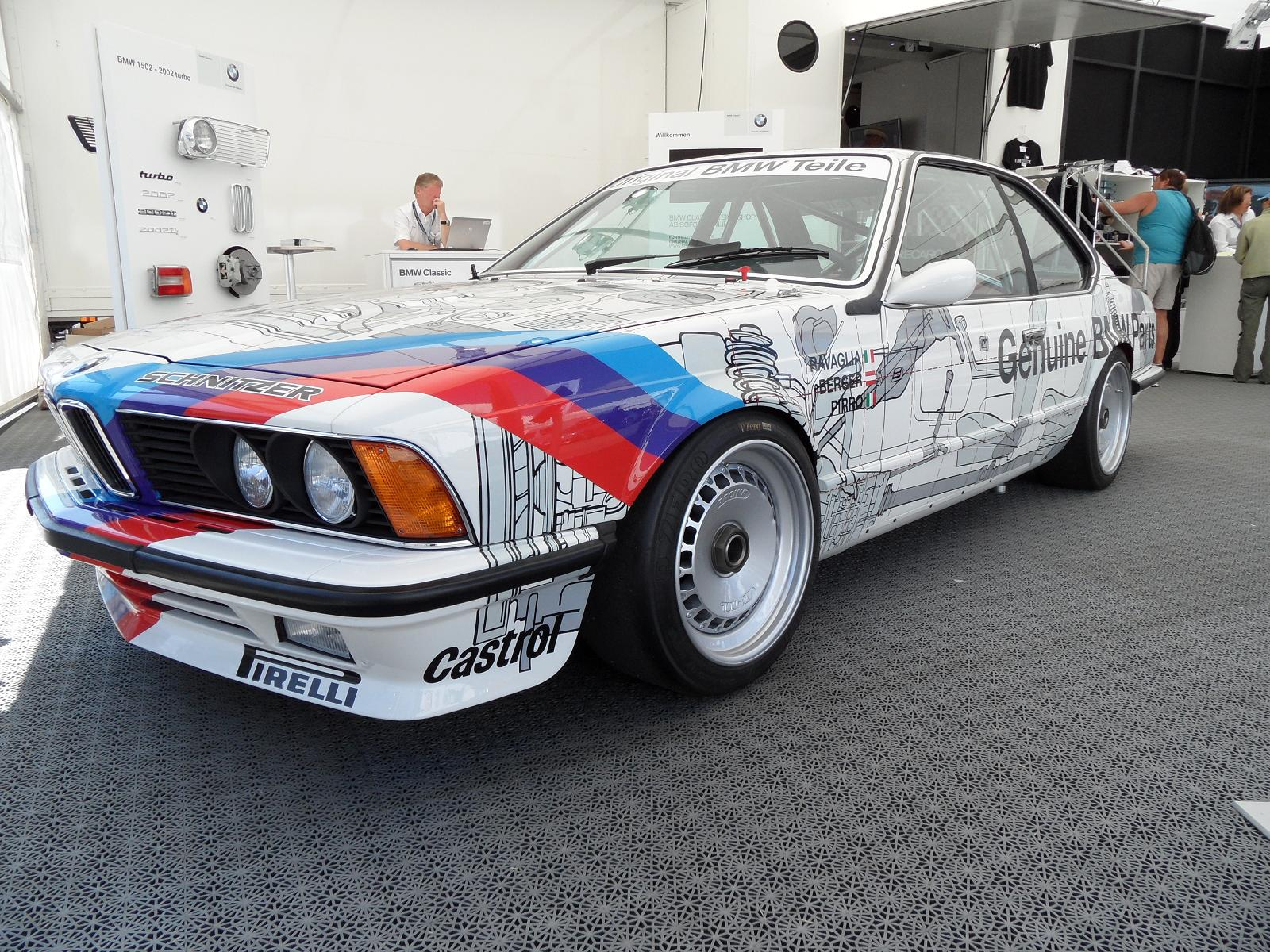
E24 635 CSi Group A

The M30 block powered a series of E9 CSL and E24 6 Series coupes to European Touring Car Championship (ETCC) throughout the 1970s and into the middle 1980s, as more powerful DOHC 24-valve heads had been developed for high-performance motorsports and street use. The BMW M49 and later BMW M88 high-performance engines are based on the M30 block.

== See also ==
- BMW
- BMW M10, the four-cylinder engine that the M30 was based on.
- BMW M20, the smaller straight-six engine which was sold alongside the M30 for many years.
- BMW M88, the high-performance, DOHC, straight-six engine that was sold alongside the M30 from 1978-1989
- BMW S38, the catalyzed version of— and ultimately the successor to— the M88, which was sold alongside the M30 from 1986-1995.
- List of BMW engines
