= Alpina B10 Bi-Turbo =

High performance executive car

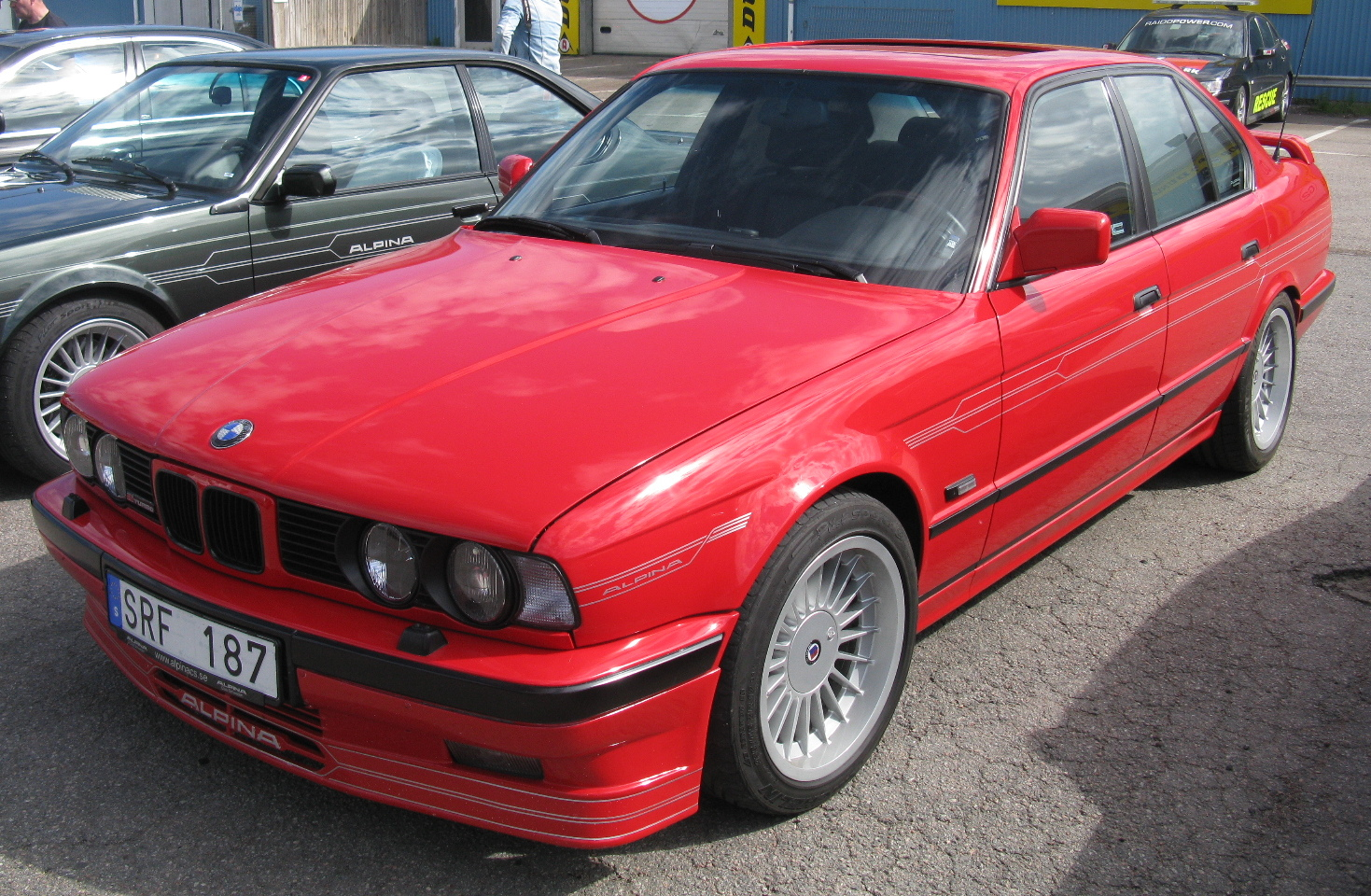

Overview
- Manufacturer: Alpina
- Production: 1989–1994 (507 built)
- Assembly: Germany: Buchloe

Body and chassis
- Class: Executive car (E)
- Body style: 4-door sedan
- Layout: Front-engine, rear-wheel-drive
- Platform: BMW E34

Powertrain
- Engine: 3.4 L twin-turbocharged BMW M30 I6
- Transmission: 5-speed Getrag 290 manual

Dimensions
- Wheelbase: 2,761 mm (108.7 in)
- Length: 4,720 mm (185.8 in)
- Width: 1,751 mm (68.9 in)
- Height: 1,400 mm (55.1 in)
- Curb weight: 1,695 kg (3,737 lb)

Chronology
- Successor: Alpina B10 4.0 (E34)

The Alpina B10 Bi-Turbo is a high performance version of the BMW 5 Series (E34) executive car manufactured by German automobile manufacturer Alpina. Beginning production in 1989, the B10 Bi-Turbo was based on the 535i and received several upgrades by Alpina, being the fastest production sedan in the world at the time of its introduction. Production ended in 1994 with 507 examples produced.

Developed at a cost of US$3.2 million, the B10 Bi-Turbo was introduced at the Geneva Motor Show in March 1989.

== Specifications ==
To build each B10 Bi-Turbo powerplant, Alpina dismantled a BMW M30 engine, replaced the stock pistons with forged Mahle units, installed two Garrett T25 water-cooled turbochargers, and added a Bosch variable boost control with range of 0.4–0.8 bar, adjustable from the driver's seat. Additional modifications helped raise the horsepower of the standard M30 engine from 155 kW (211 PS; 208 hp) at 5,700 rpm and 305 N⋅m (225 lb⋅ft) at 3,000 rpm to 265 kW (360 PS; 355 hp) at 6,000 rpm and 520 N⋅m (384 lb⋅ft) at 4,000 rpm. A Getrag 290 5-speed manual transmission was specified to handle the power.

Modifications to the suspension included Alpina-specific springs and anti-roll bars. Bilstein shock absorbers were used at the front and automatic-load levelling units by Fichtel & Sachs were used at the rear. Front brake rotors were large 13.1 in (332.7 mm) discs from UK-based Lucas Girling, bigger even than the 12.1 in (307.3 mm) pieces found on the E34 M5. Michelin MXX tyres were standard as was BMW's Automatic Stability Control (ASC).

== Performance ==
Alpina claimed a 0–100 km/h (62 mph) acceleration time of 5.6 seconds and a top speed of over 290 km/h (180.2 mph), putting it in the same league as a five years older car model Ferrari Testarossa in terms of performance. In the September 1991 issue of Road & Track, Paul Frère wrote: "For me this is the car ... I think this is the best 4-door in the world." Despite a base price tag of 146,800 DM, nearly twice the price of an E34 M5, the B10 Bi-Turbo became the best-selling single model in Alpina history up until that point. The six year production run began in 1989 and ended in August 1994. Production ended due to the discontinuation of the M30 engine by BMW in 1993. The final 50 M30 engine blocks were shipped to Alpina for use in the final 50 cars.

=== Independent performance test results ===
- 0–100 km/h (62.1 mph): 5.2 seconds
- 0–200 km/h (124.3 mph): 19.7 seconds
- 0–400 m: 13.2 seconds
- 0–1,000 m: 24.6 seconds
- 0–60 mph (97 km/h): 5.1 seconds
- 0–100 mph (161 km/h): 11.6 seconds
- Standing 1/4 mile (402m): 13.6 seconds at 107.0 mph (172.2 km/h)
- Top speed: 179.2 mph (288.4 km/h)

== Technical data ==
Model	Alpina B10 Bi-Turbo
Cylinder/valves	6/12
Bore × stroke	92,0 × 86,0 mm
Displacement	3,430 cm^{3}
Compression	7.2:1
Max. power	265 kW [257 kW] (360 PS [350 PS]) at 6,000 rpm
Max. torque	520 Nm [501 Nm] at 4,000 rpm
Top speed	291 km/h (180 mph)
Acceleration 0–100 km/h	5.6 seconds [5.9 seconds]
Acceleration 0–160 km/h	12.3 seconds
Acceleration 0–200 km/h	19.7 seconds
Acceleration 60–100 km/h in 4th gear	7.1 seconds
Acceleration 80–120 km/h in 5th gear	9.2 seconds
1000 m, standing start	24.6 seconds
Fuel consumption in l/100 km combined	12.4 liters

[Figures in brackets refer to Swiss market vehicles]

== Gallery ==
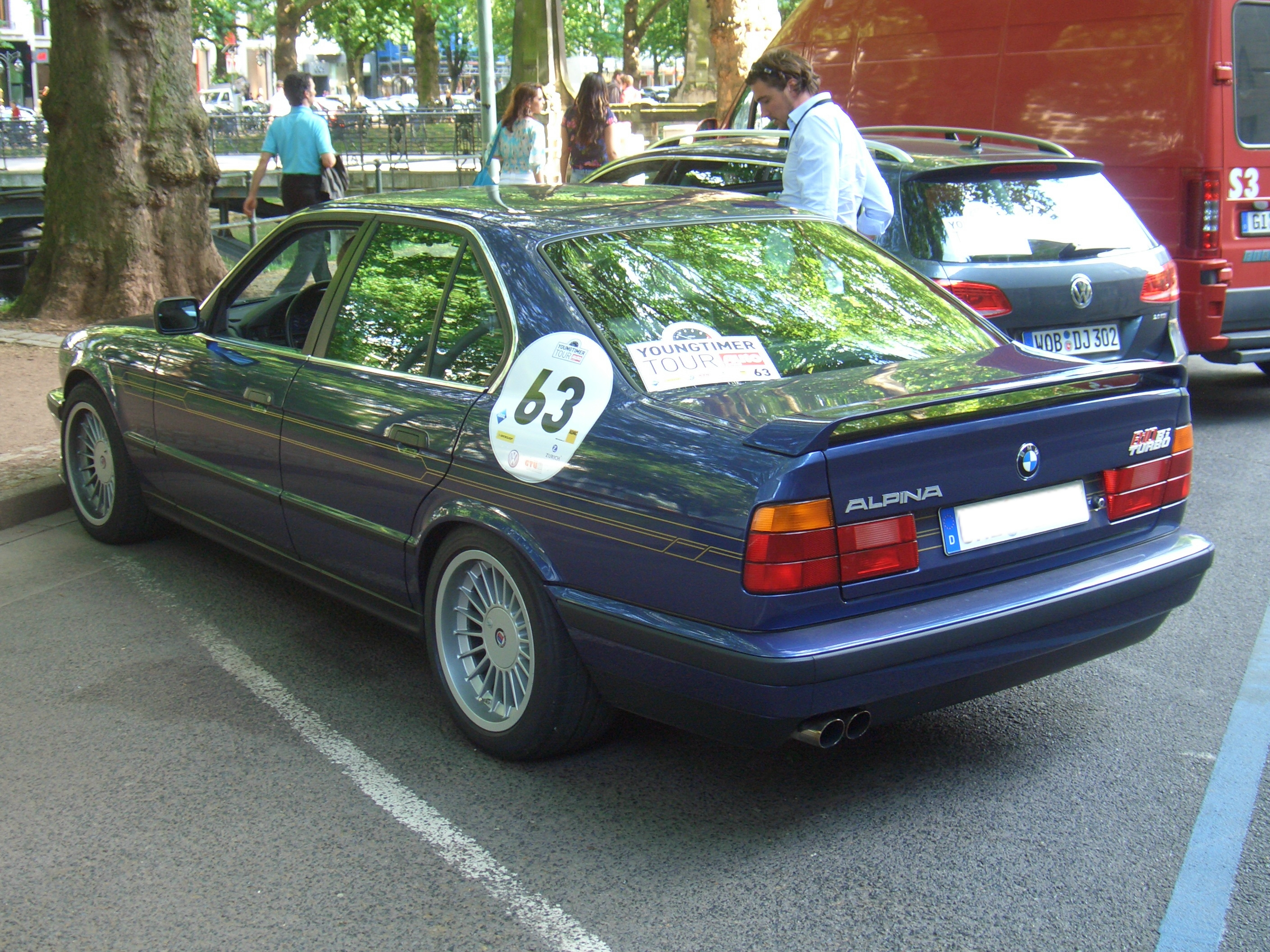
Rear view

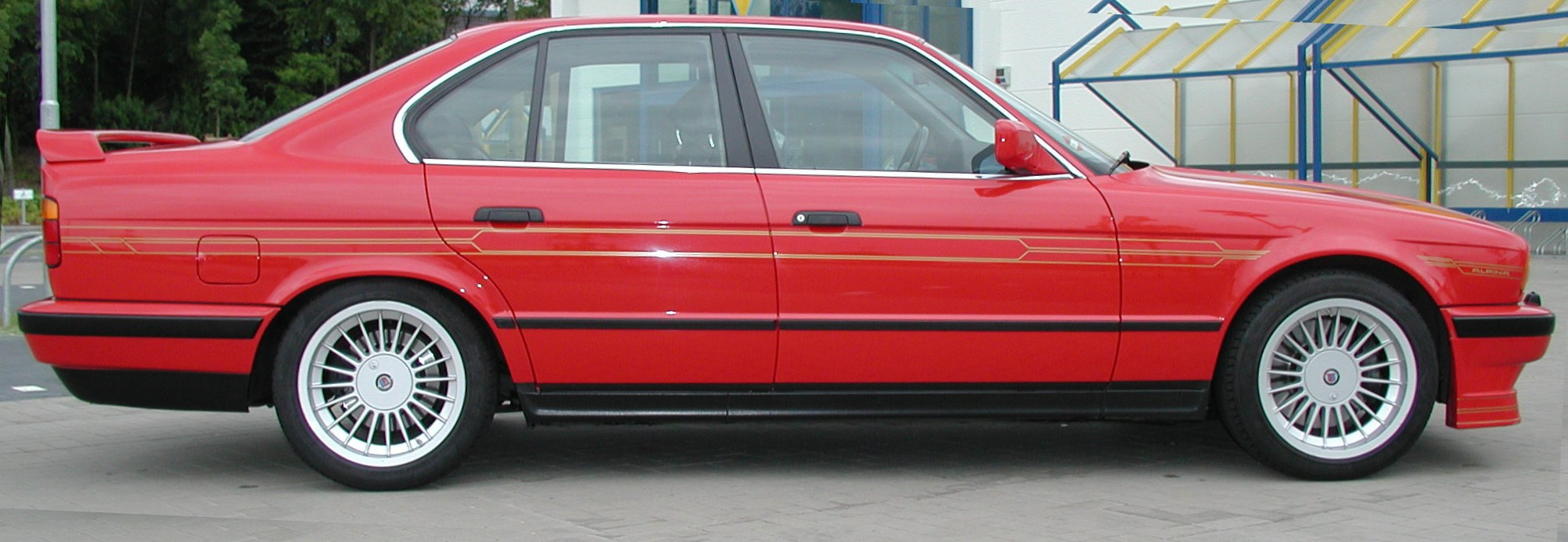

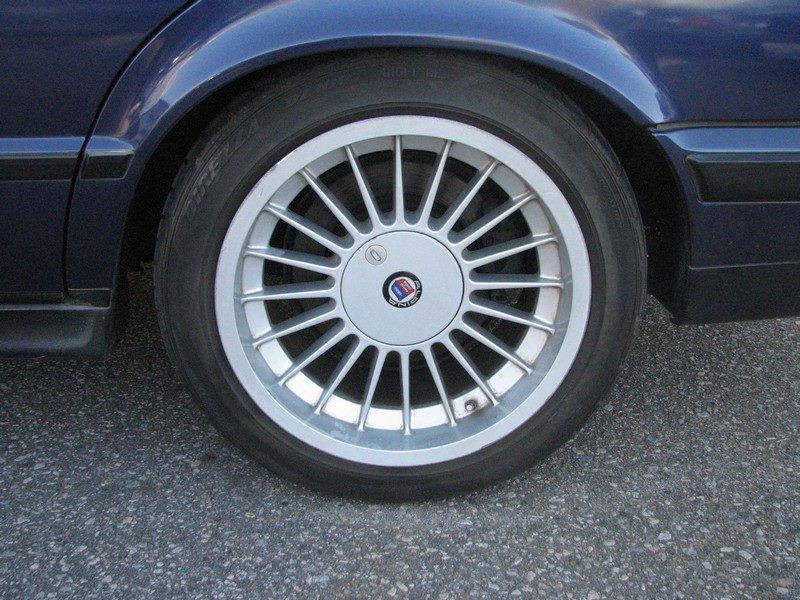
Alpina wheel

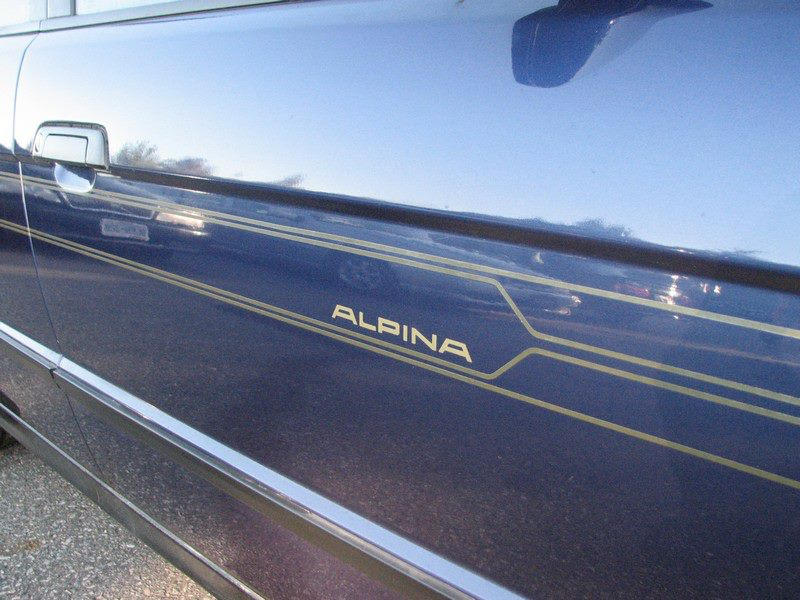
Alpina pinstripes

== Bibliography ==
- (in German) Götz Leyrer, « Fünfer Potenz », Auto, Motor und Sport, #24, 17 November 1989 (B10 Bi-Turbo, BMW M5 and AC Schnitzer S5 3.7 comparison).
- (in German) HB, « Die B-Handlung », Sport Auto, #5, May 1990 (Alpina B10 Bi-Turbo, B6 3.5S and B12 5.0 comparison).
- (in German) Götz Leyrer, « Duell in der Wonne », Auto, Motor und Sport, #13, 1990 (B10 Bi-Turbo and Ferrari 348 TB comparison).
- (in French) « Croisière à 300 à l'heure », Auto Hebdo, #749, 17 October 1990. (B10 Bi-Turbo and Ruf CTR comparison).
- (in Spanish) Auto Hebdo Sport, #391, November 1990. (B10 Bi-Turbo and Ruf CTR comparison).
- (in English) Kevin Blick, « Vintage Alpina », Performance Car, November 1990. (B10 Bi-Turbo review).
- (in German) « Der Sinn des Strebens », Auto, Motor und Sport, #3, 1991 (B10 Bi-Turbo, BMW M5, Opel Lotus Omega and Mercedes-Benz 500E comparison).
- (in English) « World's fastest cars », Road & Track, #9, September 1991 (sports car comparison: Lamborghini, Ferrari, Corvette ZR4, Ruf...).
- (in French) « 360CV dans une berline au sommet », BMWorld, #4 (B10 Bi-Turbo review).
- (in English) « Saloonacy », Classic & Sports car, #1, 2004 (B10 Bi-Turbo and Opel Lotus Omega comparison).
- (in French) Maxime Joly, Alpina B10 Biturbo e34 (1989 - 1994) : Autoroute racer, automobile-sportive.com, 27 February 2010 (retrieved 9 March 2014).
- (in German) Alexander Bernt, Alpinas Turbo-Tiere, Auto Bild, 9 June 2011 (Retrieved 7 December 2014)
- McAleer, Brendan (28 November 2014). "Iron fist in a velvet glove: Alpinas were always posh hot rods"..
