= BMW 7 Series (E32) =

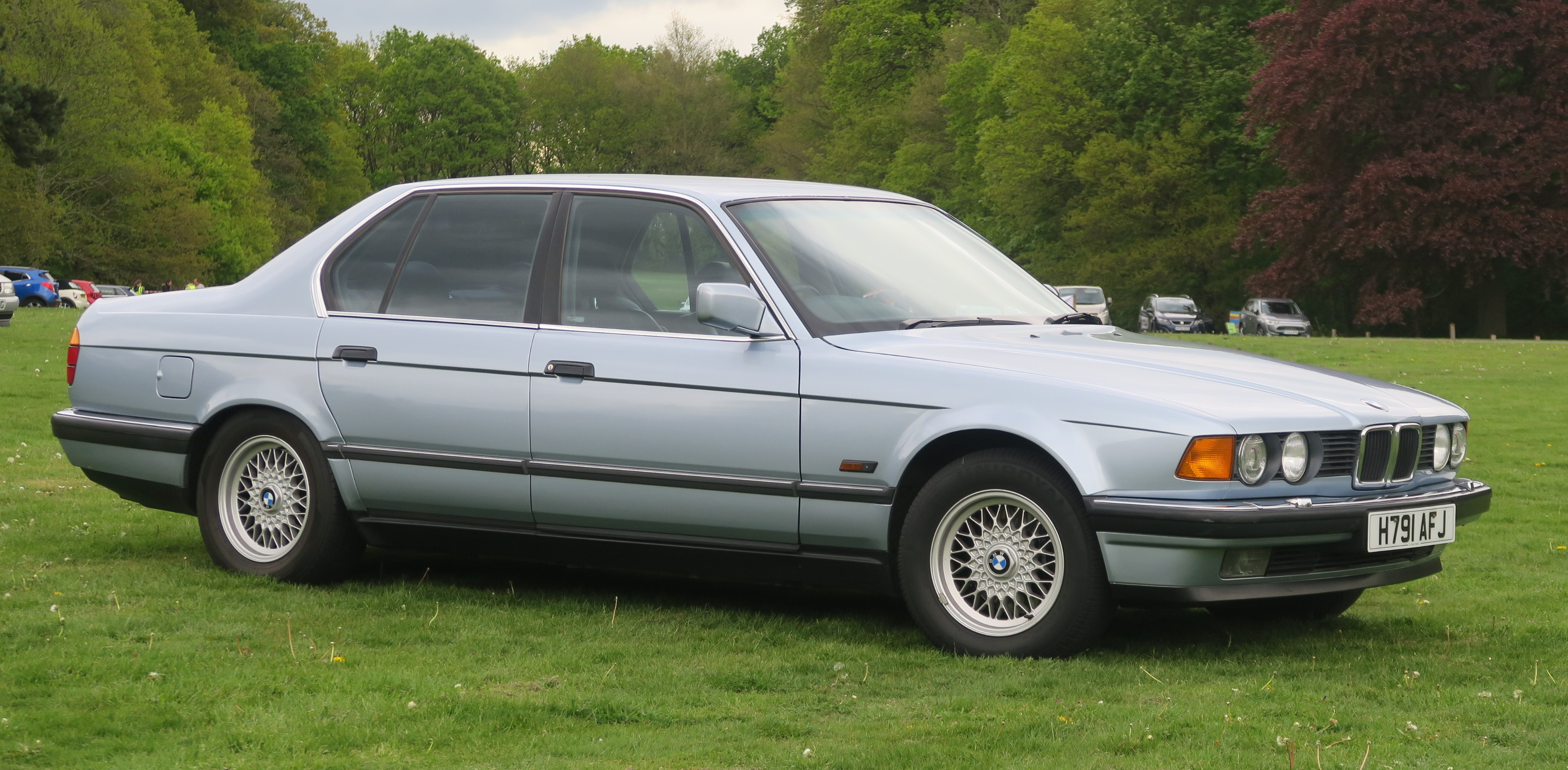
- 730i

Overview
- Manufacturer: BMW
- Production: June 1986–April 1994
- Model years: 1987–1994
- Assembly: Germany: Dingolfing (Dingolfing Plant); South Africa: Rosslyn (BMW ZA)
- Designer: Ercole Spada (concept exterior: 1981, 1983); Hans Kerschbaum (production exterior: 1983); Claus Luthe (design director: 1979-84)

Body and chassis
- Class: Full-size luxury car (F)
- Body style: 4-door sedan/saloon
- Layout: Longitudinal front-engine, rear-wheel-drive
- Related: Alpina B12; BMW 5 Series (E34)

Powertrain
- Engine: 3.0–3.4 L M30 I6; 3.0–4.0 L M60 V8; 5.0 L M70 V12
- Transmission: 4-speed ZF 4HP automatic; 5-speed ZF 5HP automatic; 5-speed Getrag manual

Dimensions
- Wheelbase: SWB: 2,833 mm (111.5 in); LWB: 2,947 mm (116.0 in)
- Length: SWB: 4,910 mm (193.3 in); LWB: 5,029 mm (198.0 in)
- Width: 1,845 mm (72.6 in)
- Height: SWB: 1,400 mm (55.1 in); LWB: 1,435 mm (56.5 in)
- Curb weight: 1,720–1,930 kg (3,792–4,255 lb)

Chronology
- Predecessor: BMW 7 Series (E23)
- Successor: BMW 7 Series (E38)

The BMW E32 is the second generation of the BMW 7 Series luxury cars and was produced from 1986 until 1994. It replaced the E23 and was initially available with straight-six or V12 powerplants. In 1992, V8 engines became available. From its inception, the E32 was among the most technologically advanced cars of its day.

The E32 introduced numerous features including adaptive suspension (EDC), traction control, two available wheelbases (i and iL), and dual-zone climate control. The E32 750i was the first car adhering to a gentlemen's agreement amongst the German manufacturers limiting maximum speed to 250 km/h (155 mph).

Other automotive passenger vehicles features introduced with the E32 included: projector lens headlamps (1986); double glazed windows (1991); HID (Xenon) headlamps (1991).

E32 also introduced BMW's first V8 engine since the BMW 501/502 (last produced in 1962), and their first V12 engine – which also made it the first V12-engined German car since the Maybach Zeppelin DS8 of 1939.

In 1994, the E32 was replaced by the E38, a clear evolution of the E32.

== Development and production ==
Styling was by chief stylist Ercole Spada and Hans Kerschbaum working under chief designer Claus Luthe. Design work began in late 1979. By 1983, 1:1 scale models were presented and frozen in October 1984 for production which was scheduled in June 1986. In a later interview with then BMW chief engineer Wolfgang Reitzle, it was revealed that a last-minute decision was taken to widen the car by 40mm in order to improve its stance, and to develop a V12 engine, which would give the new 7-series a competitive advantage over the Mercedes S-Class. Reitzle persuaded BMW management, despite the fact that press tooling for the bodyshell had already been manufactured, and scrapping it would cost an estimated 300 million Deutsche Mark, and would push out the car's release date by a year.

Production of the E32 7 series started with the 735i in June 1986 and the 730i in December 1986, concluding in April 1994 with a total of 311,068 units built.

== Features ==
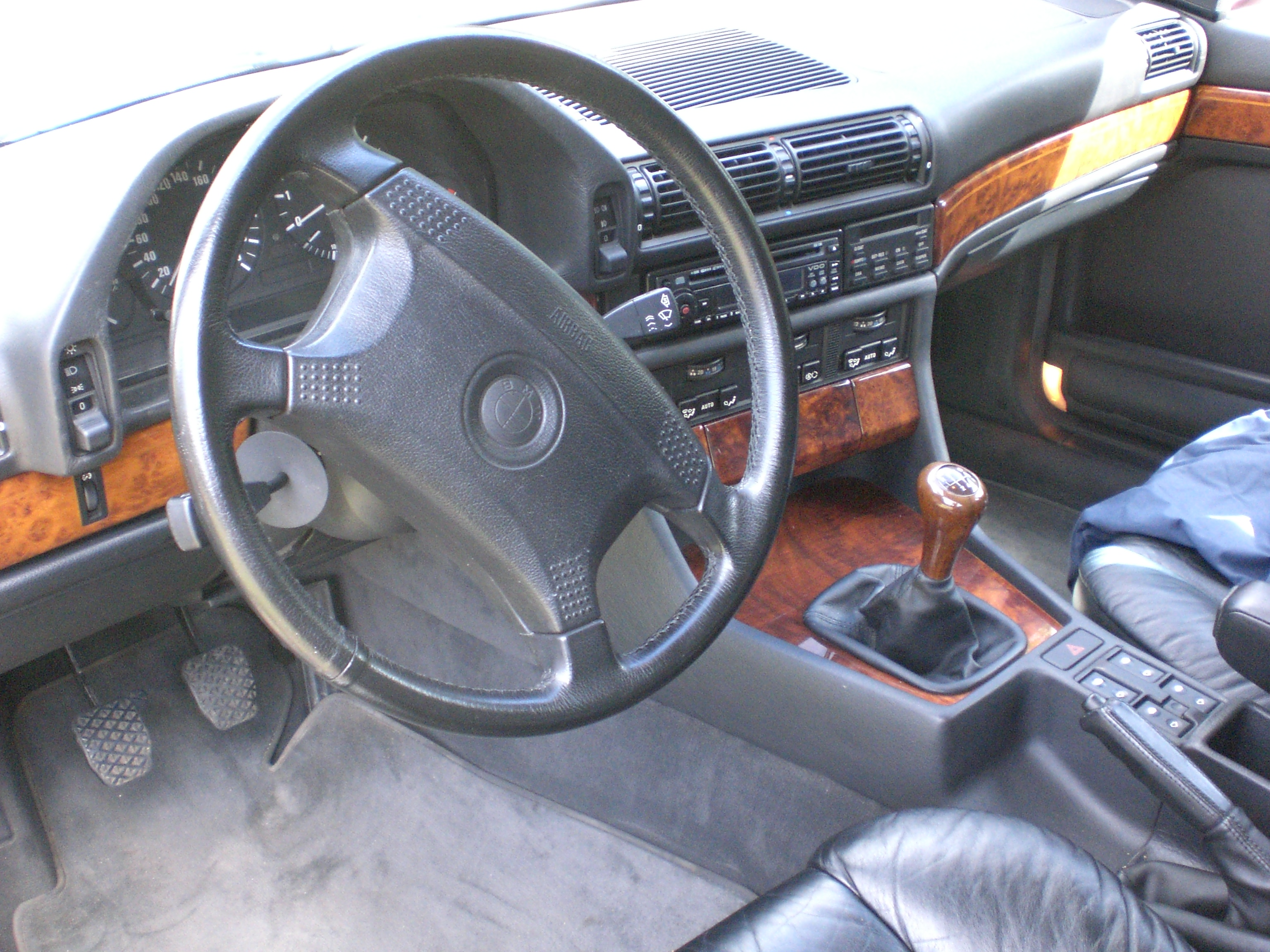
Interior

Some luxury options featured on the E32 include integrated telephone and fax machines, a wine cooler, electronically adjustable rear seats and radio controls for rear passengers (exclusive to the 750iL).

In 1991, first series-production low beam Xenon high-intensity discharge headlamps (Litronic, only low beam) were introduced on the 750iL. Other safety features include a system that automatically increased spring pressure on the windscreen wipers in five stages, to keep them firmly pressed on the glass at motorway speeds.

The E32 was the first BMW available with traction control (marketed as Automatic Stability Control, though not considered stability control by more modern standards). Initial versions of ASC reduced wheelspin by reducing engine power, while later versions (ASC+T) also applied the rear brakes.

The E32 was also available in a long-wheelbase version (indicated by an 'L' from German Lang, after the model number) with an extra 11.4 cm (4.5 in) of rear leg room..

== Engines ==
Over its lifespan, the E32 7 Series was produced with straight-six, V8 and V12 gasoline engines.

The launch models consisted of the 730i/iL and 735i/iL, which were powered by the M30 straight-six engine. In June 1987, the 12-cylinder 750i/iL was added to the lineup. This could be distinguished by being fitted with a grille with wider "kidneys", as well as by having rectangular exhaust tips. The rated power output of the 5.0 L (4,988 cc) M70 V12 is 220 kW (300 PS).

In 1991, BMW began production of its first V8 engine since the end of BMW 501/502 production in 1962. This M60 V8 was introduced in the E32, along with the E34 5 Series. The 4.0 litre version powered the new 740i/iL models, and the 3.0 litre version was sold in parallel with the M30 straight-six in the 730i/iL models. The top speed of the 740i was electronically limited to 240 km/h (149 mph). Both V8 engines were coupled to a new, 5-speed automatic transmission made by ZF. The Nikasil bore lining used in the M60 engine was prone to damage when used with high-sulfur fuels.

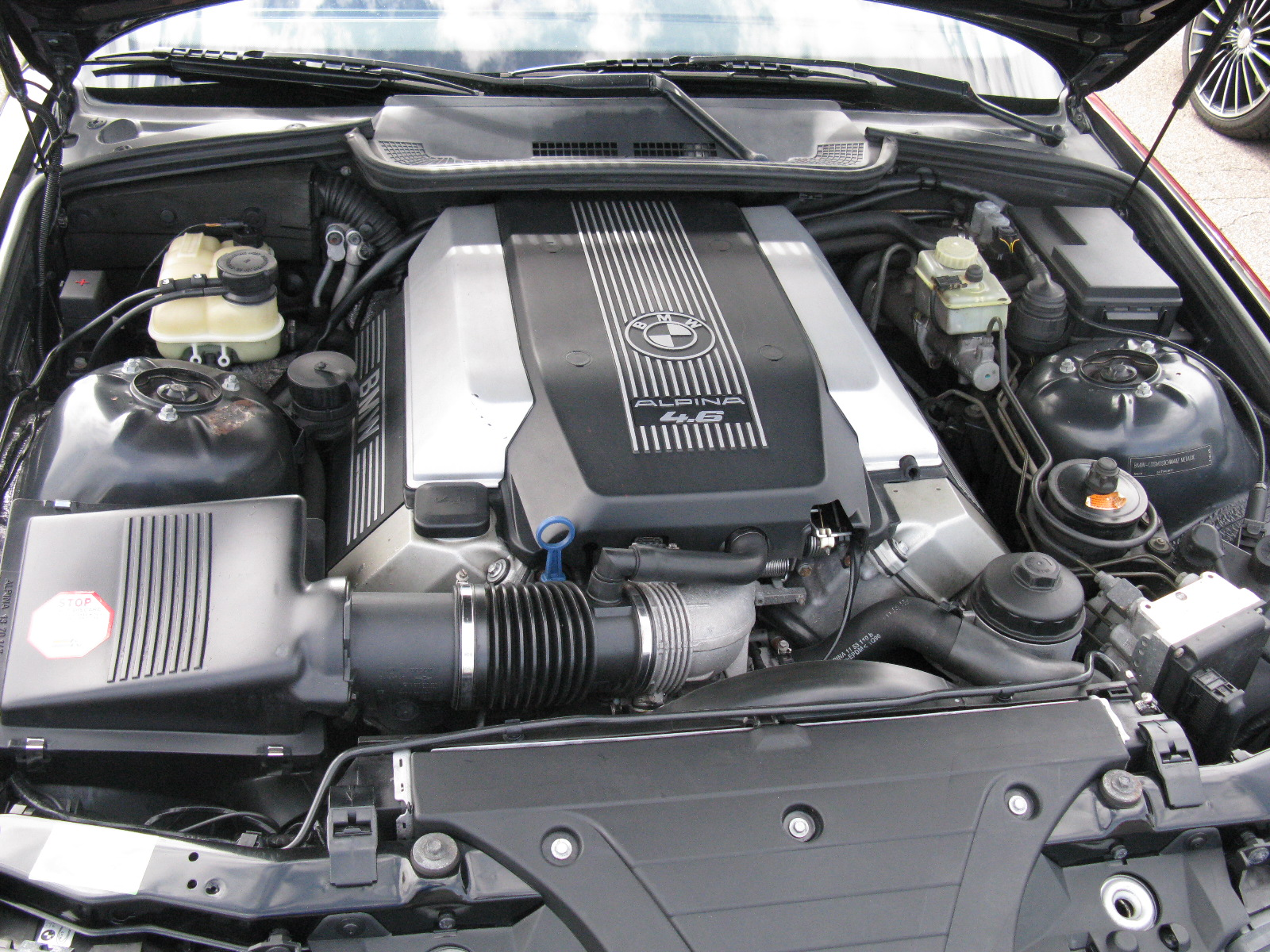
M60 V8 engine

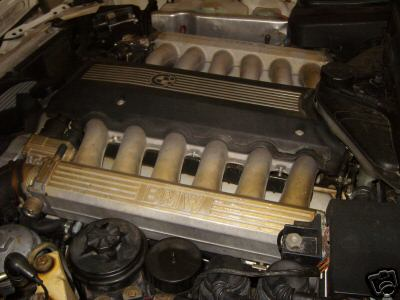
M70 V12 engine

== Styling ==
The E32 was the first BMW to use L-shaped tail-lights, which were designed with safety of following traffic in mind. Other styling features include a Hofmeister kink in the rear window line and circular headlights. A narrow variant of BMW's kidney grille correlated with 6-cylinder models, and a wider grille was standard for the V8 and V12 models.

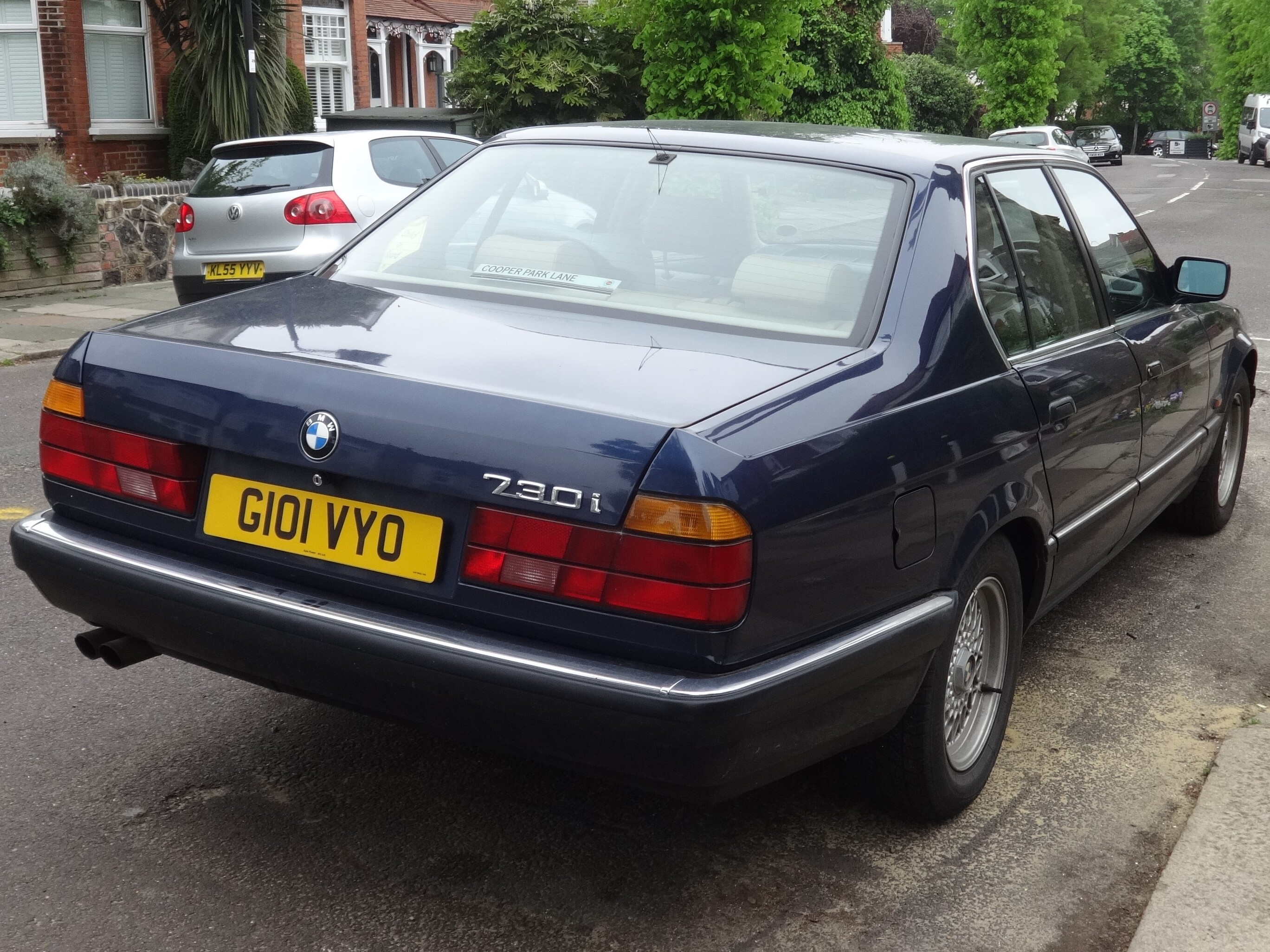
BMW E32 730i (rear)

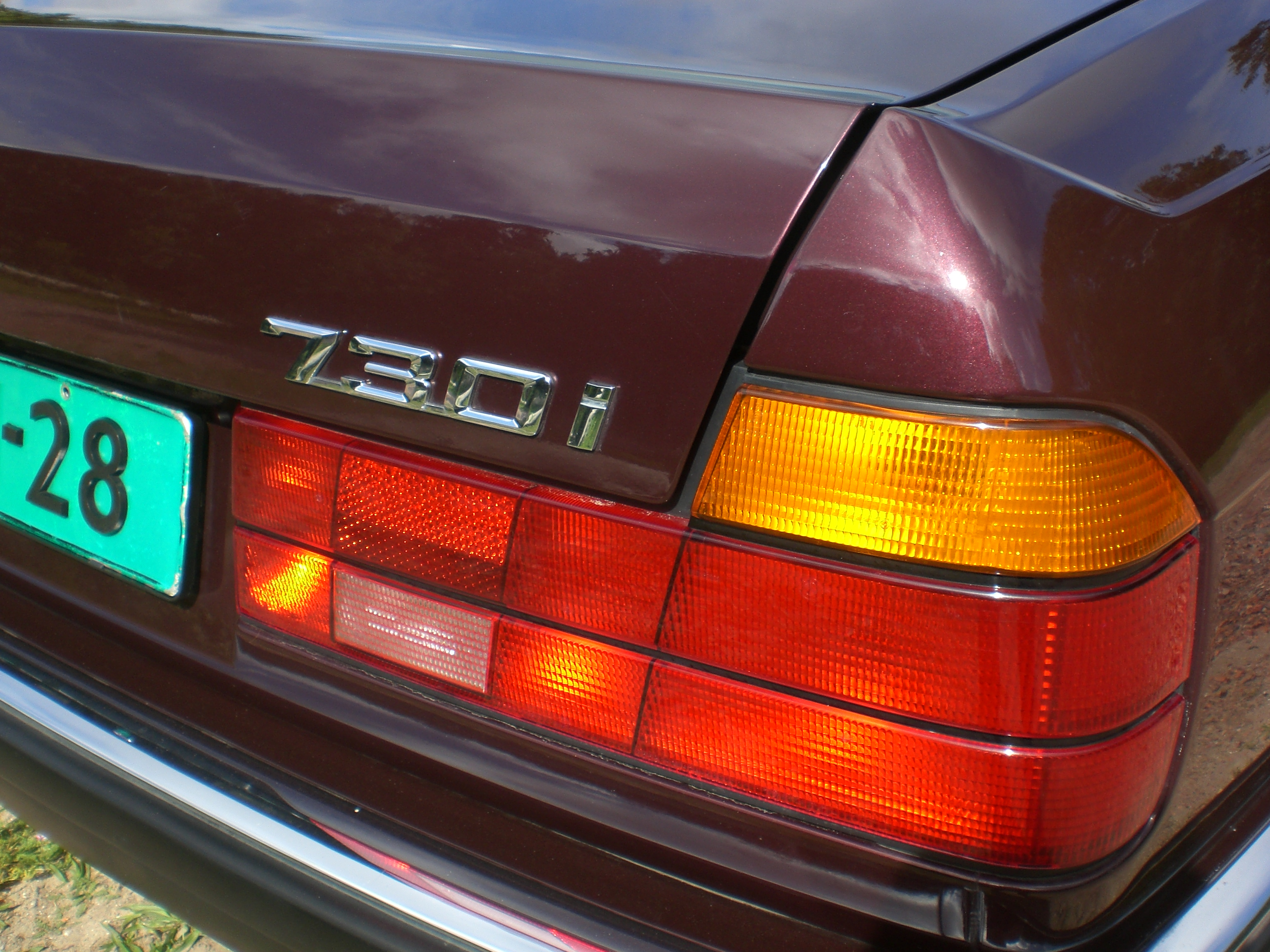
L-shaped tail-lights

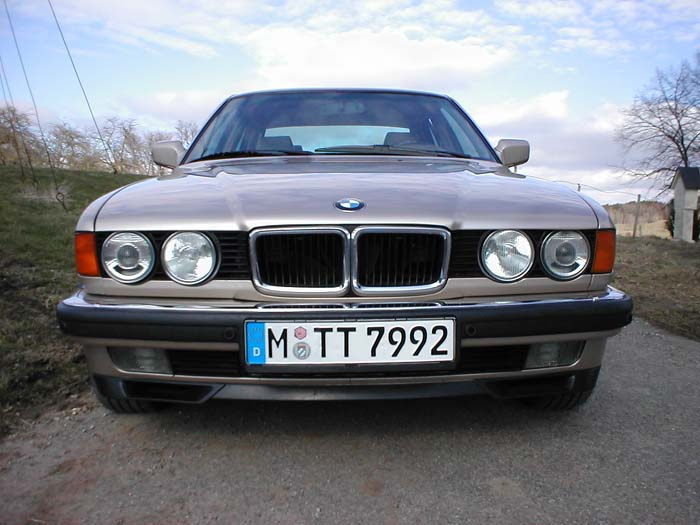
BMW E32 740i (wide grille)

== Models ==
The official specifications are as follows.

| Model | Engine | Power | Torque | 0–100 km/h acceleration | Top Speed | Years |
|---|---|---|---|---|---|---|
| 730i | M30B30; I6 | 135 kW (184 PS; 181 hp) at 5,800 rpm | 260 N⋅m (192 lb⋅ft) at 4,000 rpm | 10.8 (AT); 9.4 (MT) | 212 km/h (132 mph) (AT); 222 km/h (138 mph) (MT) | 1986–1987 |
| 730i | M30B30; I6 | 138 kW (188 PS; 185 hp) at 5,800 rpm | 260 N⋅m (192 lb⋅ft) at 4,000 rpm | 10.8 (AT); 9.4 (MT) | 212 km/h (132 mph) (AT); 222 km/h (138 mph) (MT) | 1987–1994 |
| 730i | M30B30; I6 | 145 kW (197 PS; 194 hp)* at 5,800 rpm | 275 N⋅m (203 lb⋅ft)* at 4,000 rpm | 10.6 (AT); 9.3 (MT) | 225 km/h (140 mph) (AT); 230 km/h (143 mph) (MT) | 1986–1992 |
| 730i | M60B30; V8 | 160 kW (218 PS; 215 hp) at 5,800 rpm | 290 N⋅m (214 lb⋅ft) at 4,500 rpm | 9.3 (AT); 8.5 (MT) | 230 km/h (143 mph) (AT); 233 km/h (145 mph) (MT) | 1992–1994 |
| 735i | M30B35; I6 | 155 kW (211 PS; 208 hp) at 5,700 rpm | 305 N⋅m (225 lb⋅ft) at 4,000 rpm | 9.1 (AT); 8.3 (MT) | 225 km/h (140 mph) (AT); 232 km/h (144 mph) (MT) | 1986–1992 |
| 735i | M30B35; I6 | 162 kW (220 PS; 217 hp)* at 5,800 rpm | 315 N⋅m (232 lb⋅ft)* at 4,000 rpm | 9.0 (AT); 8.2 (MT) | 227 km/h (141 mph) (AT); 235 km/h (146 mph) (MT) | 1986–1992 |
| 740i | M60B40; V8 | 210 kW (286 PS; 282 hp) at 5,800 rpm | 400 N⋅m (295 lb⋅ft) at 4,500 rpm | 7.4 (AT) | 240 km/h (149 mph)** | 1992–1994 |
| 750i | M70B50; V12 | 220 kW (300 PS; 296 hp) at 5,200 rpm | 450 N⋅m (332 lb⋅ft) at 4,100 rpm | 7.4 (AT) | 250 km/h (155 mph)** | 1987–1994 |

* uncatalyzed
** Electronically limited top speed

== Alpina models ==
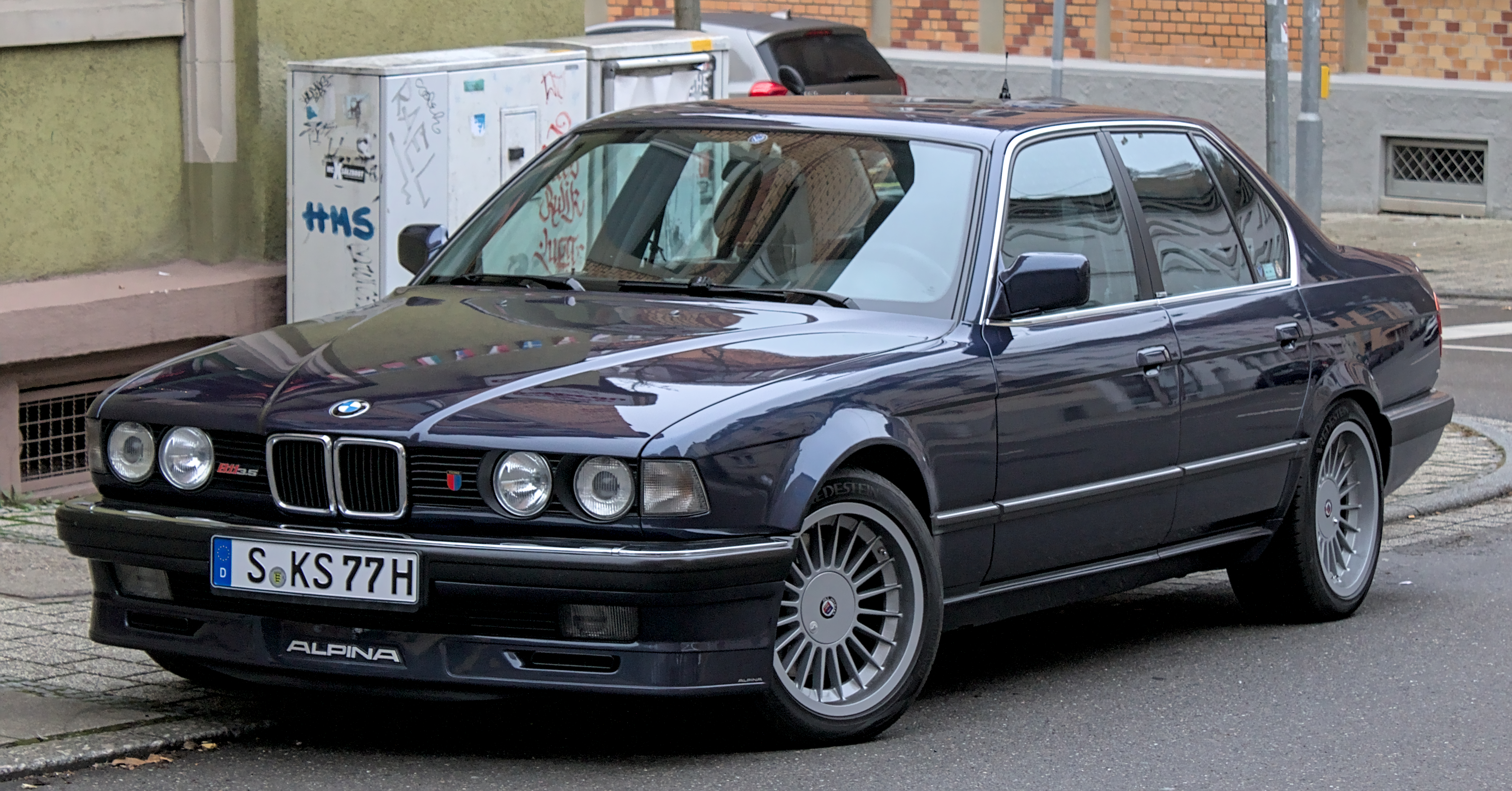
Alpina B11 3.5

The Alpina B11 3.5 is based on the E32 735i and introduced in 1987 with a 187 kW (254 PS; 251 hp) inline-six engine. Between 1987 and 1993 a total of 332 cars were produced.

The Alpina B11 4.0 is based on the E32 740i with a modified engine producing 232 kW (315 PS; 311 hp) (compared with 210 kW (286 PS; 282 hp) for the 740i) and 410 N⋅m (302 lb⋅ft) of torque. Just 7 cars were made in 1993 and 1994.

The Alpina B12 5.0 is based on the E32 750i/750iL and uses a modified V12 engine producing 257 kW (350 PS; 345 hp) (compared with 220 kW (299 PS; 295 hp) for the 750i/750iL) and 470 N⋅m (347 lb⋅ft) of torque. A total of 305 cars were made.

== Special models ==
=== 750iL Highline ===
The BMW 750iL Highline was the top-of-the-line model of the E32, with lots of added luxury for the rear passengers like full leather seats, dual radio controls, dual climate control with coolbox mounted in the center console, electrically heated and adjustable rear seats, walnut veneer folding tables, two crystal glasses neatly placed in the coolbox, leg rests, and electronically operated sun shades all around the rear/side windows. Complete with independent heating and ventilation, it also added a second battery in the trunk and a second alternator to provide power for all these luxuries. The 'Highline' option package cost more than 20,000 DM, and was only available on the 750iL, bringing the total price to well over twice that of a base model 730i.

=== Goldfisch prototype ===
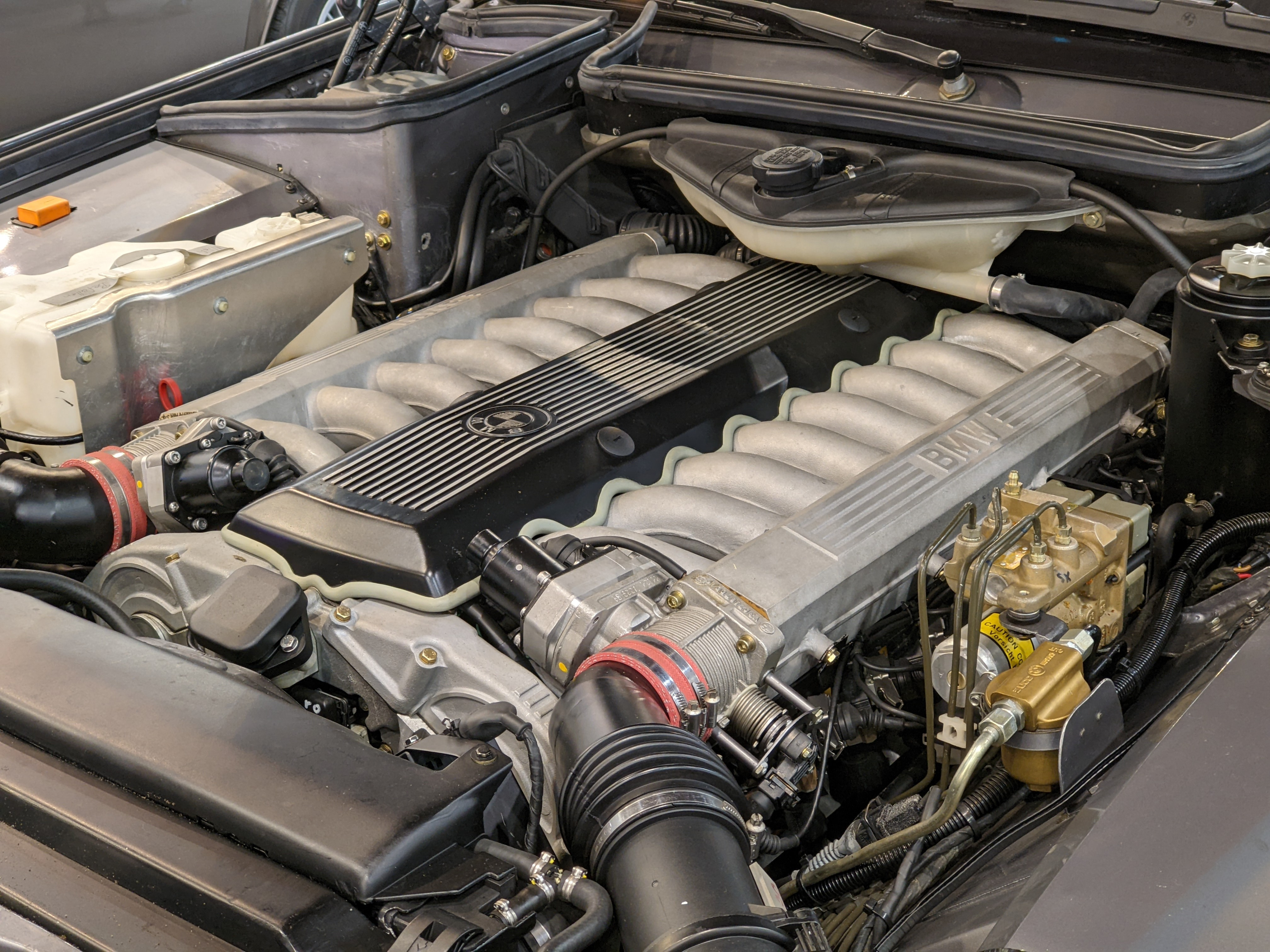
BMW Goldfisch V16 prototype

The Goldfisch, also called the 767 or the "Secret Seven" internally, is a concept full size luxury car based on the E32 750i. Conceived by Dr. Karlheinz Lange in the late 1980s, it was meant to be the top-of-the line variant of the 7 Series also designed to compete with offerings from rival Mercedes-Benz. Dr. Lange also involved two other employees in the project, namely Adolf Fischer and Hanns-Peter Weisbarth both being senior employees. The concept car was completed in just six months. The main notable feature is the V16 engine designed by Adolf Fischer, which is essentially a modified M70 V12 enlarged to have four extra cylinders, capacity enlarged to 6.7-litres, etched iron pistons, nine-bearing crankshaft and having silicone-aluminium casting. The engine was fitted with Bosch DME 3.3 engine management system for better performance. Desired level of performance was achieved when the system treated the engine as two inline-8 engines bolted together. The resulting engine had a power output of 414 PS (304 kW; 408 hp) and 625 N⋅m (461 lb⋅ft) of torque. Power was sent to the rear wheels via a 6-speed manual transmission shared with the E31 8 Series. The car had the engine cooling system located in the boot along with fabricated fibre glass gills and air scoops at the rear to aid in cooling as there was no space to accommodate them at the front as the resulting engine was 305 mm (12 in) longer than the V12 engine. Air was expelled through a custom made valence panel at the rear of the car which led to the use of small tail lights with no fog and reverse lights. Despite the usage of a large V16 engine, the car was only 60 kg (132 lb) heavier than the 750i. The Goldfisch could accelerate to 100 km/h (62 mph) in a claimed 6 seconds and could attain a top speed of 282 km/h (175 mph). The car remained a technology demonstrator only and was never put into production due to the V16 engine being incompliant to the environmental regulations.
