= BMW M3 =

High-performance version of the BMW 3 Series automobile

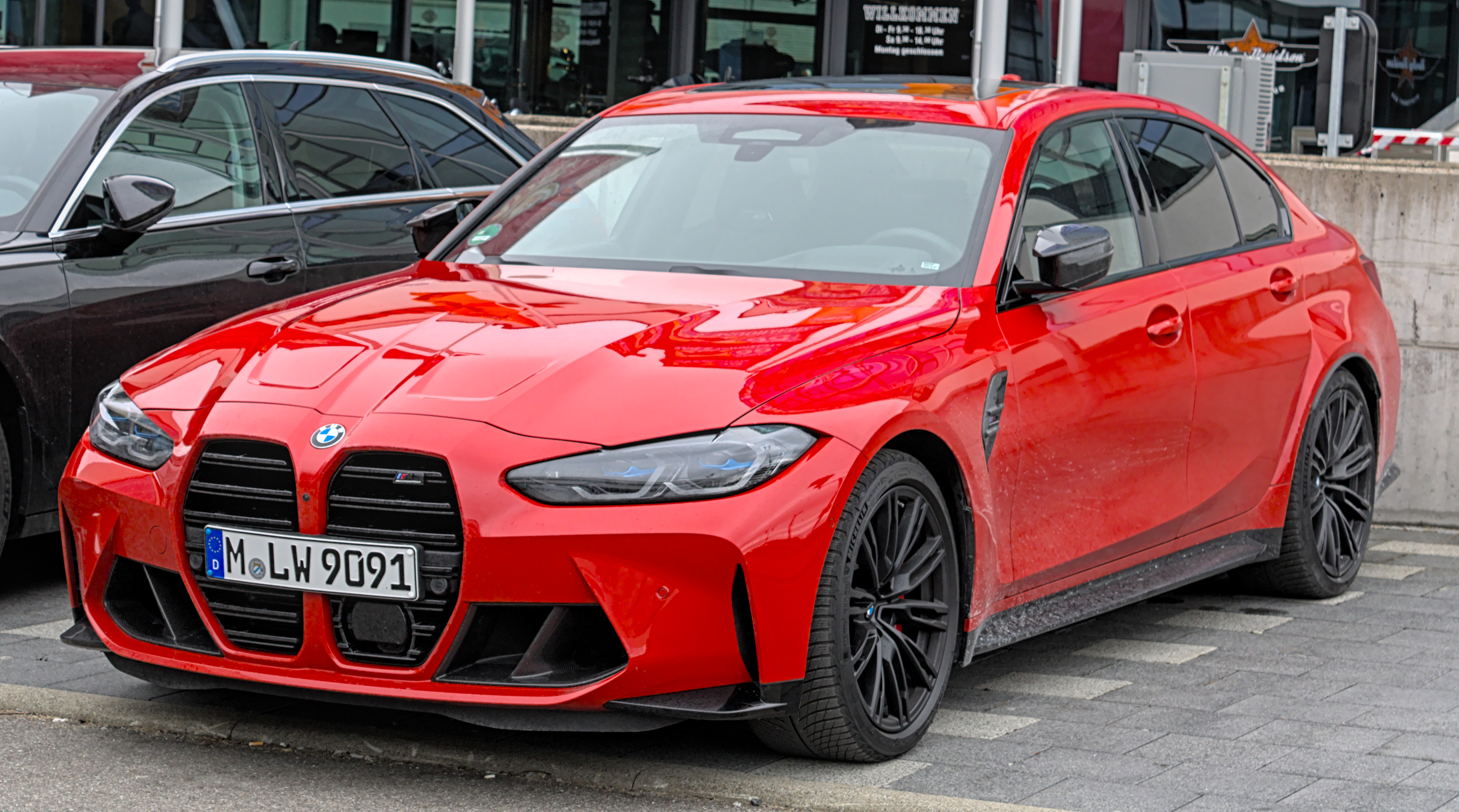
- 2021 BMW M3 Competition (G80)

Overview
- Manufacturer: BMW M
- Production: 1986–2018; 2020–present

Body and chassis
- Class: Compact executive car (D)
- Layout: Front-engine, rear-wheel-drive; Front-engine, all-wheel-drive (2021–present)
- Related: BMW 3 Series; BMW M4

The BMW M3 is a high-performance version of the BMW 3 Series, developed by BMW's in-house motorsport division, BMW M GmbH. M3 models have been produced for every generation of 3 Series since the E30 M3 was introduced in 1986.

The initial model was available in a coupé body style, with a convertible body style made available soon after. M3 saloons were offered initially during the E36 (1994–1999) and E90 (2008–2012) generations. Since 2014, the coupé and convertible models have been rebranded as the 4 Series range, making the high-performance variant the M4. Variants of the 3 Series since then have seen the M3 produced as a saloon, until 2020, when the M3 was produced as an estate (Touring) for the first time, alongside the saloon variant.

== E30 generation (1986–1991) ==
BMW M3 (E30)
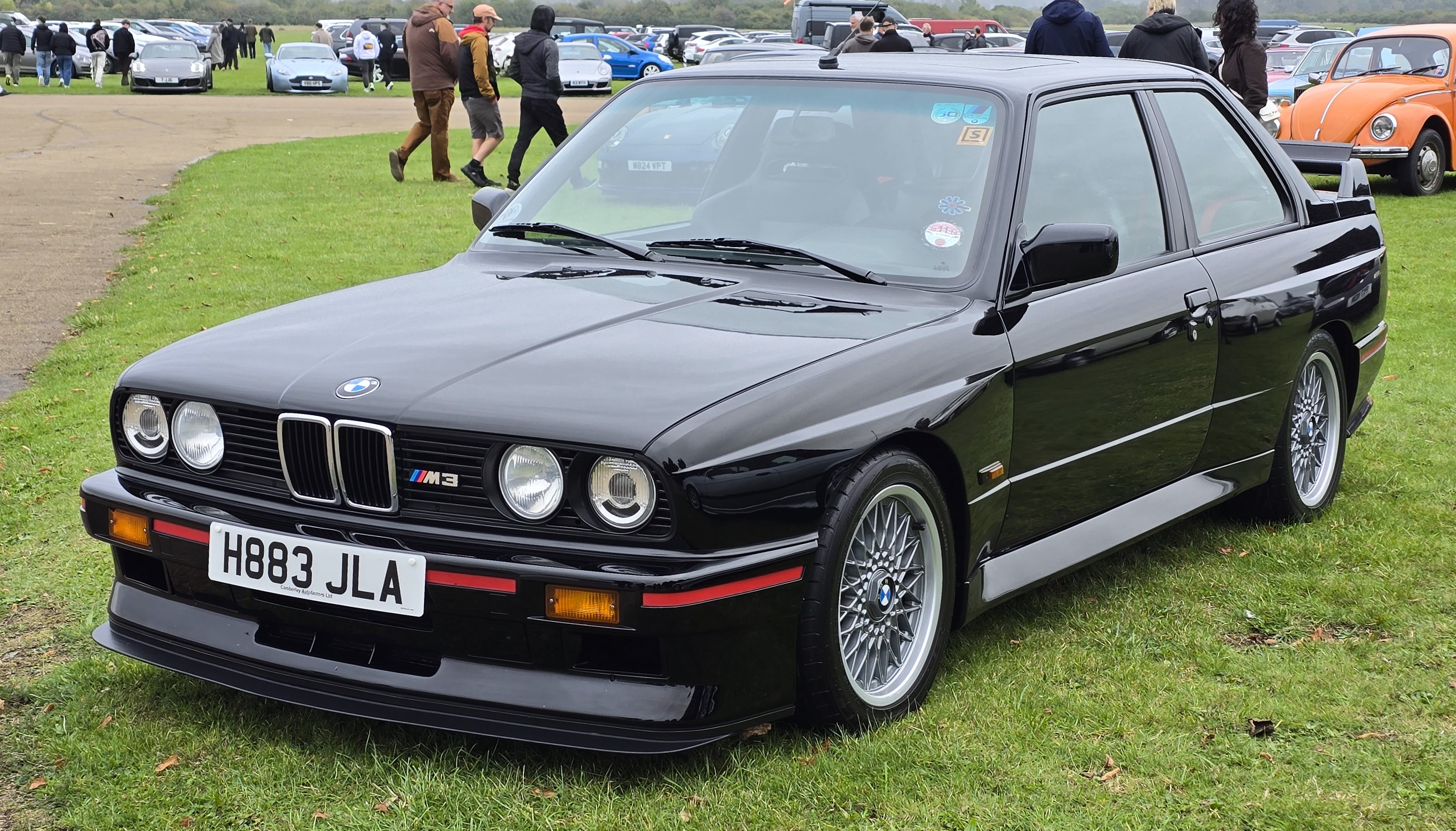
- BMW M3 Evolution II

Overview
- Production: March 1986 – June 1991
- Designer: Claus Luthe

Body and chassis
- Body style: 2-door 2+2 sedan; 2-door 2+2 convertible
- Layout: Front-engine, rear-wheel-drive
- Related: BMW 3 Series (E30)

Powertrain
- Engine: 2.3—2.5 L S14 I4
- Transmission: 5-speed manual

Dimensions
- Wheelbase: 2,562 mm (100.9 in)
- Length: 4,345 mm (171.1 in)
- Width: 1,680 mm (66.1 in)
- Height: 1,370 mm (53.9 in)
- Curb weight: 1,165–1,360 kg (2,568–2,998 lb)

The first BMW M3 was based on the E30 3 Series and was intended to be a homologation special to satisfy the Deutsche Tourenwagen Meisterschaft and Group A Touring rules, which required a total of 5,000 of the base model to be built with a further 500 evolution specials. It was presented to the public at the 1985 Frankfurt Motor Show, and began production from March 1986 to June 1991. The E30 M3 was mainly produced in the coupé body style, but limited volumes of convertibles were also produced.

The front splitter, the rear apron, sill panels, as well as changes to the body in the area of the rear window (C-pillar) and the bootlid improved the aerodynamics. For aerodynamic reasons, the rear window was flattened and the tailgate was made of light, glass-reinforced plastic raised by approximately 40 mm for better air flow. The changes over the rear of the car resulted in lower lift forces and better straight-line stability. In addition, the windscreen was glued in – not, as with the other E30 models, framed with a window rubber and piping. As a result, the M3 achieved a relatively low drag coefficient of Cd=0.33 instead of Cd=0.38 as in the standard 3 Series. The only exterior body panels the regular 3 Series and the M3 shared were the bonnet, roof panel, and sunroof.

The brake calipers, discs and master cylinder were unique to the M3 model.

The transmission was a Getrag 265 5-speed manual. European models were outfitted with a dogleg version with close ratios and a 1:1 ratio for fifth gear. North American models used a traditional shift pattern and had wider gear spacing with an overdriven fifth gear. A clutch-type limited-slip differential was standard equipment.

In 2004, Sports Car International named the E30 M3 number six on the list of Top Sports Cars of the 1980s. In 2007, Automobile Magazine included the E30 M3 in their "5 greatest drivers cars of all time" under their 25 Greatest Cars of All Time.

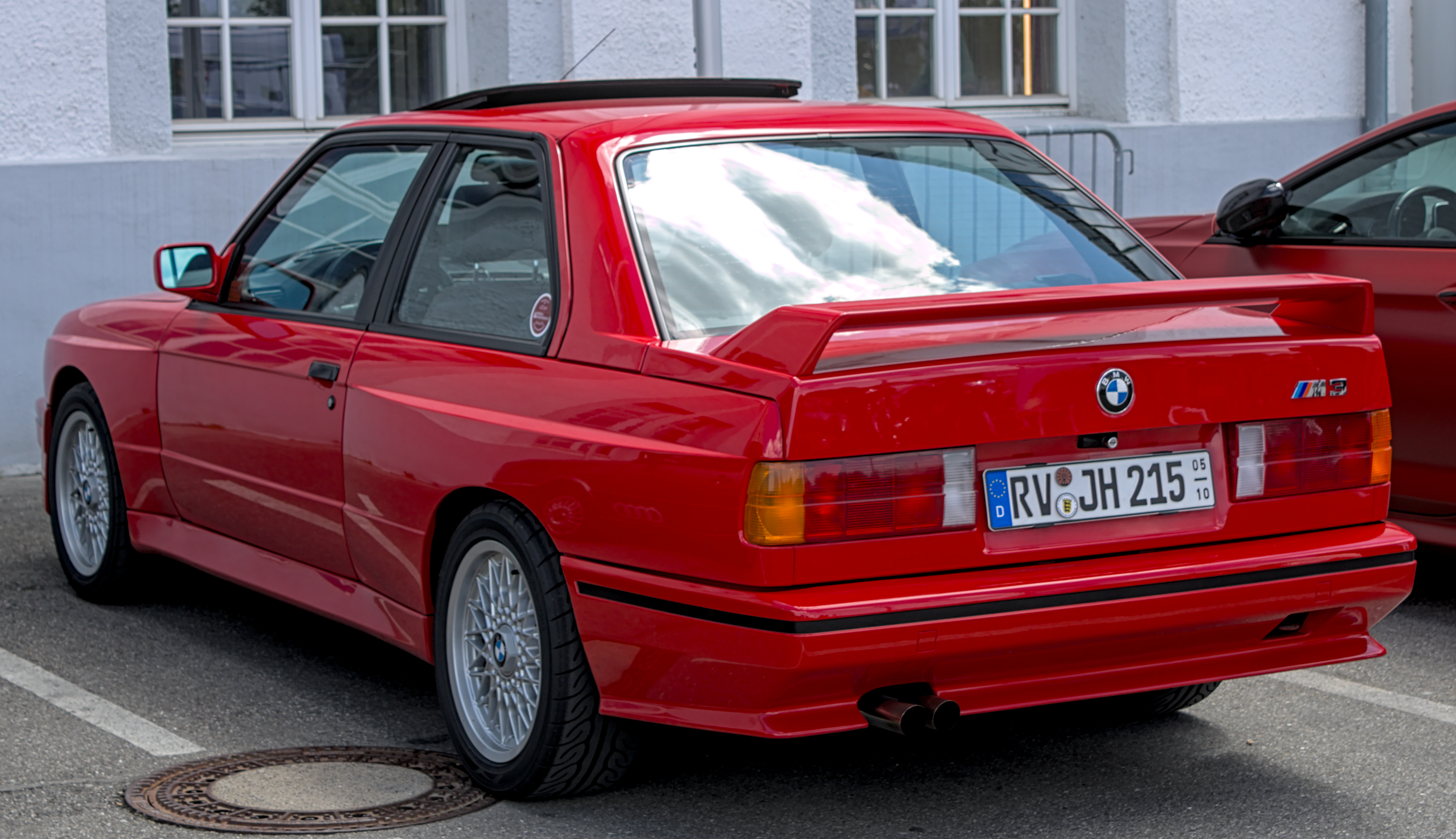
Sedan

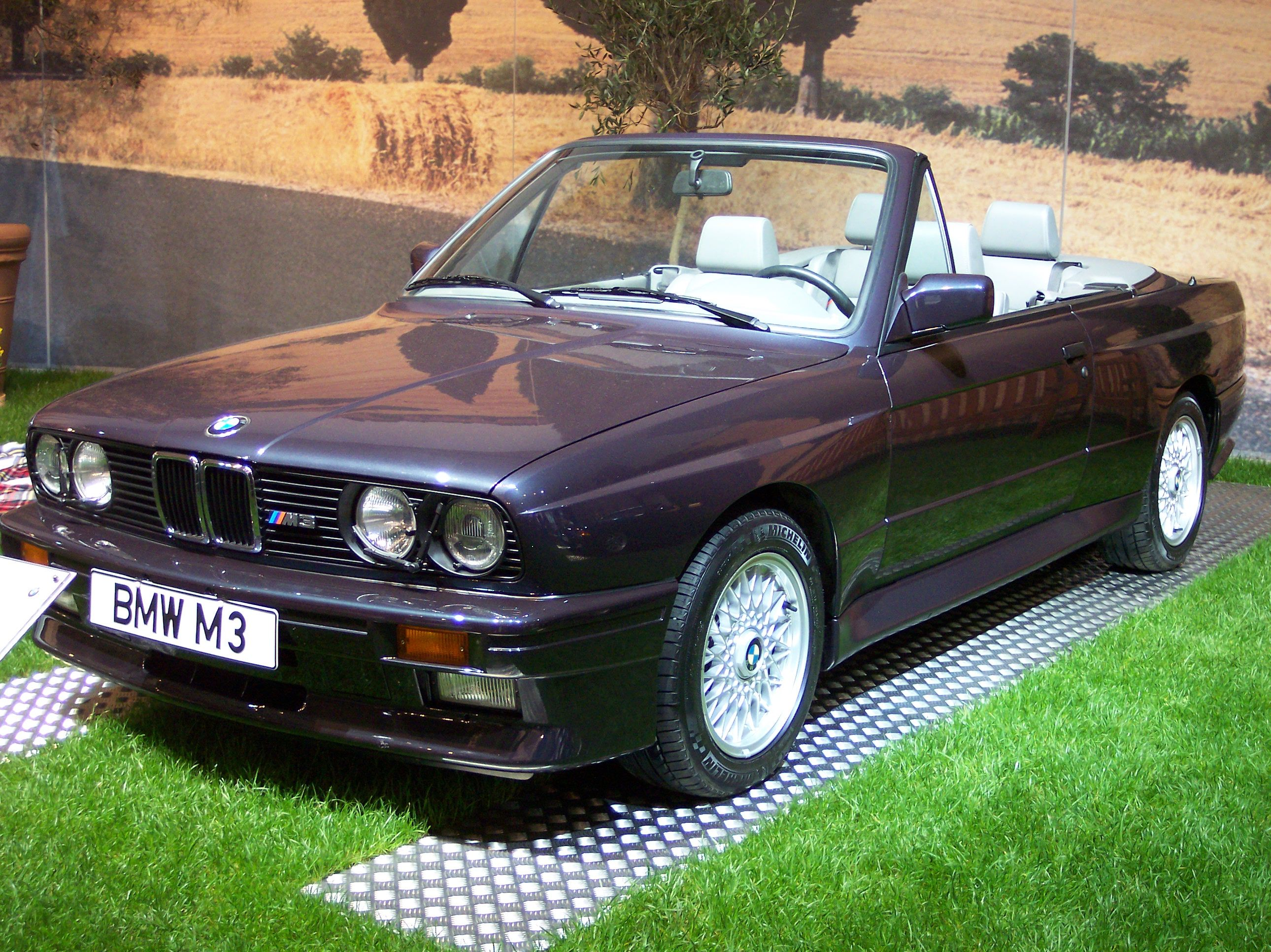
Convertible

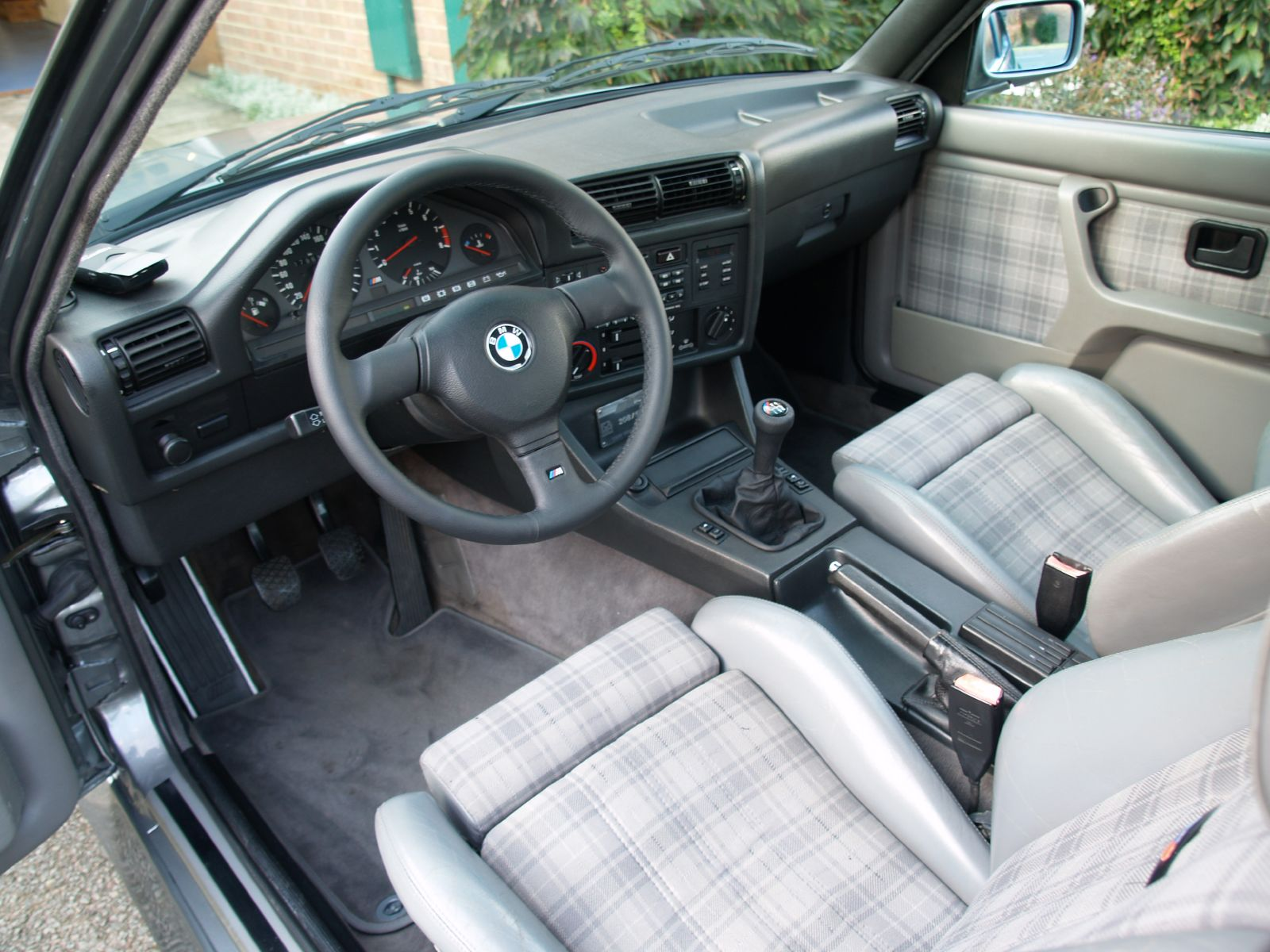
E30 M3 interior

=== Engine ===
The E30 M3 used the BMW S14 four-cylinder engine, a high-revving DOHC design with a head closely based on that of the BMW S38 six-cylinder engine and the block from the BMW M10 four-cylinder engine with a 7,250 rpm redline. In countries where the M3 was sold with a catalytic converter, the initial versions were rated at 143 kW (195 PS; 192 hp) and had a top speed of 235 km/h (146 mph). In countries where a catalytic converter was not fitted, the engine was rated at 147 kW (200 PS; 197 hp).

=== Suspension & Brakes ===
Differences from the standard E30 models included:

- 5-stud wheel hubs
- 225/45R16 Pirelli P700-Z tyres
- offset control arm bushings in the front suspension, for increased caster angle
- front aluminium control arms introduced in 1989
- revised front strut tubes with bolt on kingpins and swaybar mounted to strut tube, similar to the E28 5 Series
- front wheel bearings and brake caliper bolt spacing from the E28 5 Series
- 280mm x 25mm vented front & 282mm x 12mm solid rear discs
- brake calipers similar to the E28 5 series

=== Special Editions ===
==== Evolution 1 ====
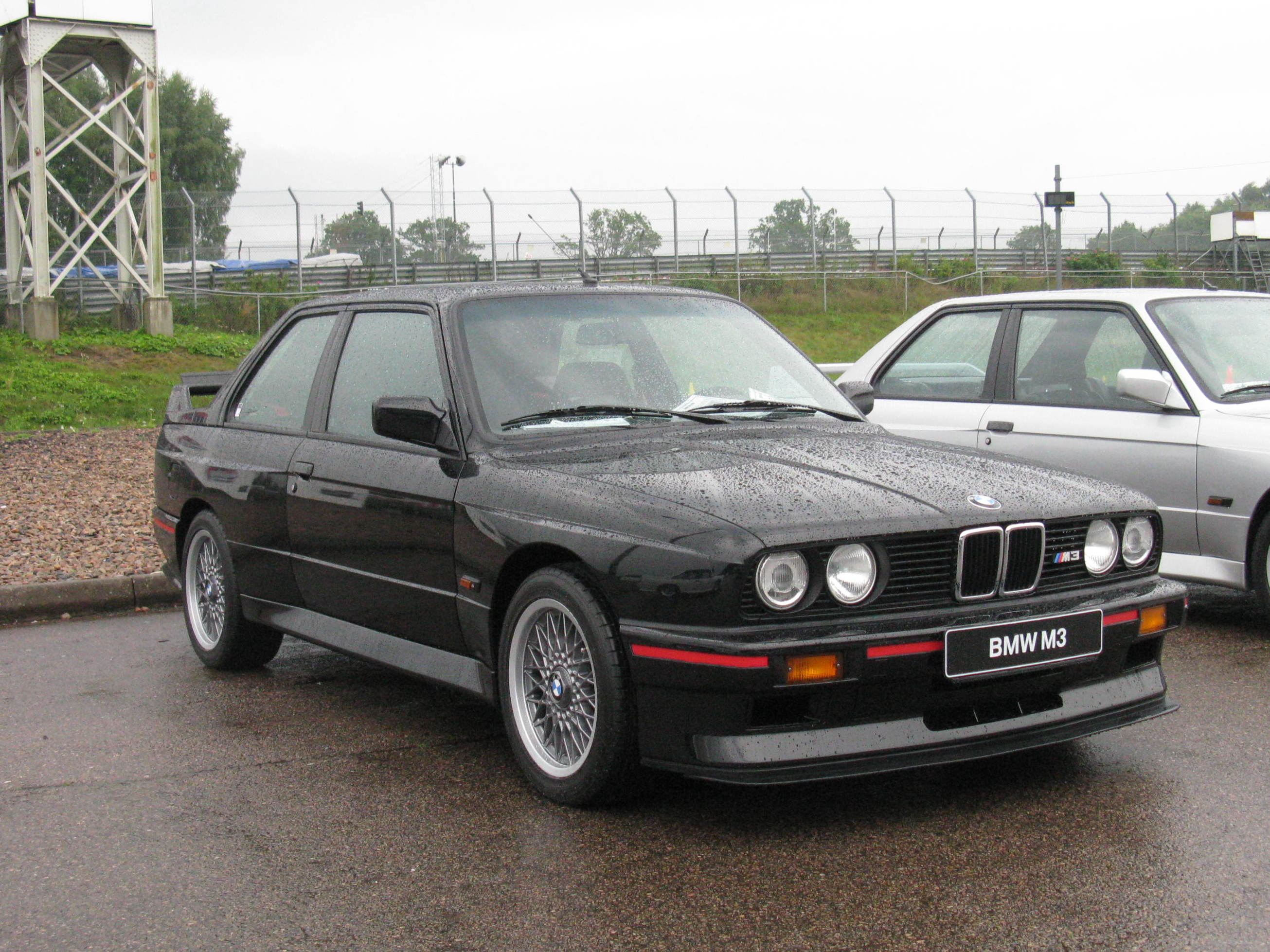
M3 Sport Evolution

In 1987 an "Evolution" model (also called "EVO1") was released. Although not designated by BMW as an Evolution model, these had a revised cylinder head (designated by an "E" stamp) to improve performance. Power was unchanged from the standard M3. Visually, these were unchanged from the standard E30 M3. In total, 505 were built between March and May 1987. To celebrate the M3's victory at the 1987 Tour de Corse (round five of that year's World Rally Championship), BMW France commissioned a batch of 50 Evolution 1 special editions.

==== Evolution 2 ====
To keep the M3 competitive for the 1988 season, the Evolution 2 was released. 501 examples were built between March and May 1988, it featured a revised camshaft, pistons and an increased compression ratio from 10.5:1 to 11.0:1. There was also a more efficient air intake and a lightened flywheel. Visually the Evolution 2 featured a BMW Motorsport tricolour camshaft and intake plenum cover. Power increased to 162 kW (220 PS) at 6750 rpm and 245 N⋅m (181 lb⋅ft) at 4750 rpm. For the Evolution 2, BMW installed a slightly reduced final drive ratio to provide a higher top speed (3.15:1 instead of 3.25:1).

Visual changes included a deeper front air dam with brake cooling ducts instead of fog lights, while the boot lid featured a rear spoiler complete with a new trailing flap. These assemblies were all made lighter than on previous iterations of the M3. More weight was saved thanks to the installation of thinner side and rear glass.

==== Sport Evolution ====
For 1990, a more powerful and lighter "Sport Evolution" model (sometimes referred to as "EVO3") with a limited production run of 600 units, was produced with an upgraded 2,467 cc (150.5 cu in) engine rated at 175 kW (238 PS; 235 hp) at 7,000 rpm and 240 N⋅m (177 lbf⋅ft) at 4,750 rpm. The top speed was increased to 250 km/h (154 mph). Sport Evolution models have enlarged front bumper openings and an adjustable multi-position front splitter and rear wing. Brake cooling ducts were installed in place of front foglights.

==== Ravaglia and Cecotto editions ====
In April 1989, the Ravaglia and Cecotto limited editions were released, both named after Deutsche Tourenwagen Meisterschaft (DTM) racing drivers. Power was increased to 158 kW (215 PS; 212 hp) with a catalytic converter. Cecotto Edition production consisted of 480 cars, plus 80 cars for the Swiss market de-tuned to 155 kW (211 PS; 208 hp) to meet Swiss emissions limits. The production run for the Ravaglia Edition consisted of 25 cars.

=== M3 Pickup prototype ===
In 1986, BMW produced an "M3 Pickup" prototype pickup truck, based on the convertible model. The M3 Pickup used the narrower body of regular E30 models and was originally powered by the 2.0-litre version of the S14 engine from the Italian-specification M3. It was used by BMW M as a transporter for roughly 26 years before it was officially retired in 2012.

=== Production volumes ===
Total production of the E30 M3 was 17,970 cars.

Production breakdown
Model	Code	Market	Power	Units
Coupé
M3	AK01	Euro spec	147 kW (200 PS; 197 hp)	4,181
M3 Evolution	AK01	Euro spec	147 kW (200 PS; 197 hp)	505
Evolution II	AK01	Euro spec	162 kW (220 PS; 217 hp)	501
M3 Cat.	AK05	Euro spec	143 kW (195 PS; 192 hp)	4,591
M3	AK05	Euro spec	158 kW (215 PS; 212 hp)	1,506
M3 Sport Evolution	AK07	Euro spec	175 kW (238 PS; 235 hp)	600
M3	AK03	US spec	143 kW (195 PS; 192 hp)	5,300
Cabriolet
M3	BB01	Euro spec	147 kW (200 PS; 197 hp)	136
M3 Cat.	BB05	Euro spec	143 kW (195 PS; 192 hp)	174
M3	BB05	Euro spec	158 kW (215 PS; 212 hp)	476

=== Motorsport ===
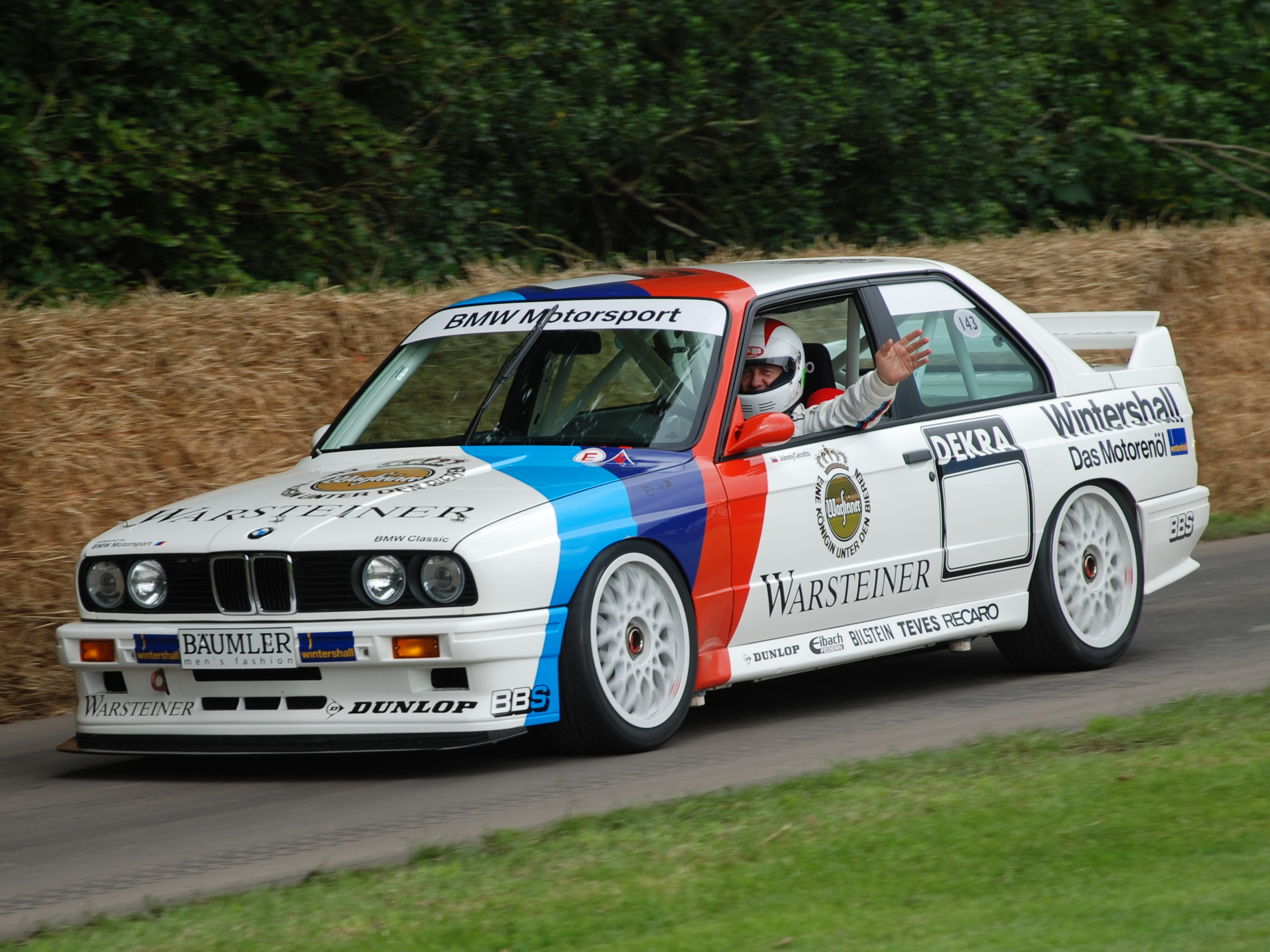
DTM racing car

The M3 E30 competed in many forms of motorsport and was highly successful in touring car racing. In full race trim, the 1988 M3's 2.3 L (140 cu in) naturally aspirated engine was rated at approximately 221 kW (300 PS; 296 hp). The E30 M3 won the 24 Hours Nürburgring five times (1989, 1990, 1991, 1992 and 1994) and the Spa 24 Hours four times (1987, 1988, 1990 and 1992), often competing against cars with significantly larger or turbocharged engines.

To keep the car competitive in racing following year-to-year homologation rules changes, homologation specials were produced and sold in limited volumes. These include the Evo 1, Evo 2, and Sport Evolution, with upgrades including weight reduction, improved aerodynamics, taller front wheel arches (to allow 18-inch wheels to be used in DTM racing), bigger brake ducts and more power output from the engine. With the introduction of the 2.5 L evolution engine into racing in 1990, power increased to approximately 279 kW (379 PS; 374 hp).

The M3 also competed as a rally car, with Prodrive-prepared examples contesting several national championships and selected rounds of the World Rally Championship between 1987 and 1989. By the latter year, the cars, based on the regular M3, were equipped with six-speed gearboxes and were rated at 221 kW (300 PS; 296 hp). The M3 was not very competitive with the four-wheel drive cars on loose surfaces, but it was a very effective car on asphalt. Its most notable success was a victory on the Tour de Corse in 1987, driven by Bernard Béguin.

==== Championships ====
- World Touring Car Championship; 1 title (1987)
- European Touring Car Championship; 2 titles (1987 and 1988)
- British Touring Car Championship; 2 titles (1988 and 1991)
- Italia Superturismo Championship; 4 titles (1987, 1989, 1990 and 1991)
- Deutsche Tourenwagen Meisterschaft; 2 titles (1987 and 1989)
- Australian Touring Car Championship; 1 title (1987)
- Australian 2.0 Litre Touring Car Championship; 1 title (1993 – 1987 BMW M3 body with a 2.0L version of the S14 engine)
- Australian Manufacturers' Championship; 2 titles (1987 and 1988 – both shared. 1987 with Nissan, 1988 with Ford and Toyota)
- AMSCAR Series; 2 titles (1987, 1991)
- Asia-Pacific Touring Car Championship; 1 title (1988)
- Irish Tarmac Rally Championship; 1 title (1990)
- New Zealand Touring Car Championship; 2 titles (1988, 1991)
- Nissan-Mobil 500 Series; 1991
- Japanese Touring Car Championship; 7 titles in JTC-2 (1987, 1988, 1989, 1990, 1991, 1992, 1993)

== E36 generation (1992–1999) ==
BMW M3 (E36)
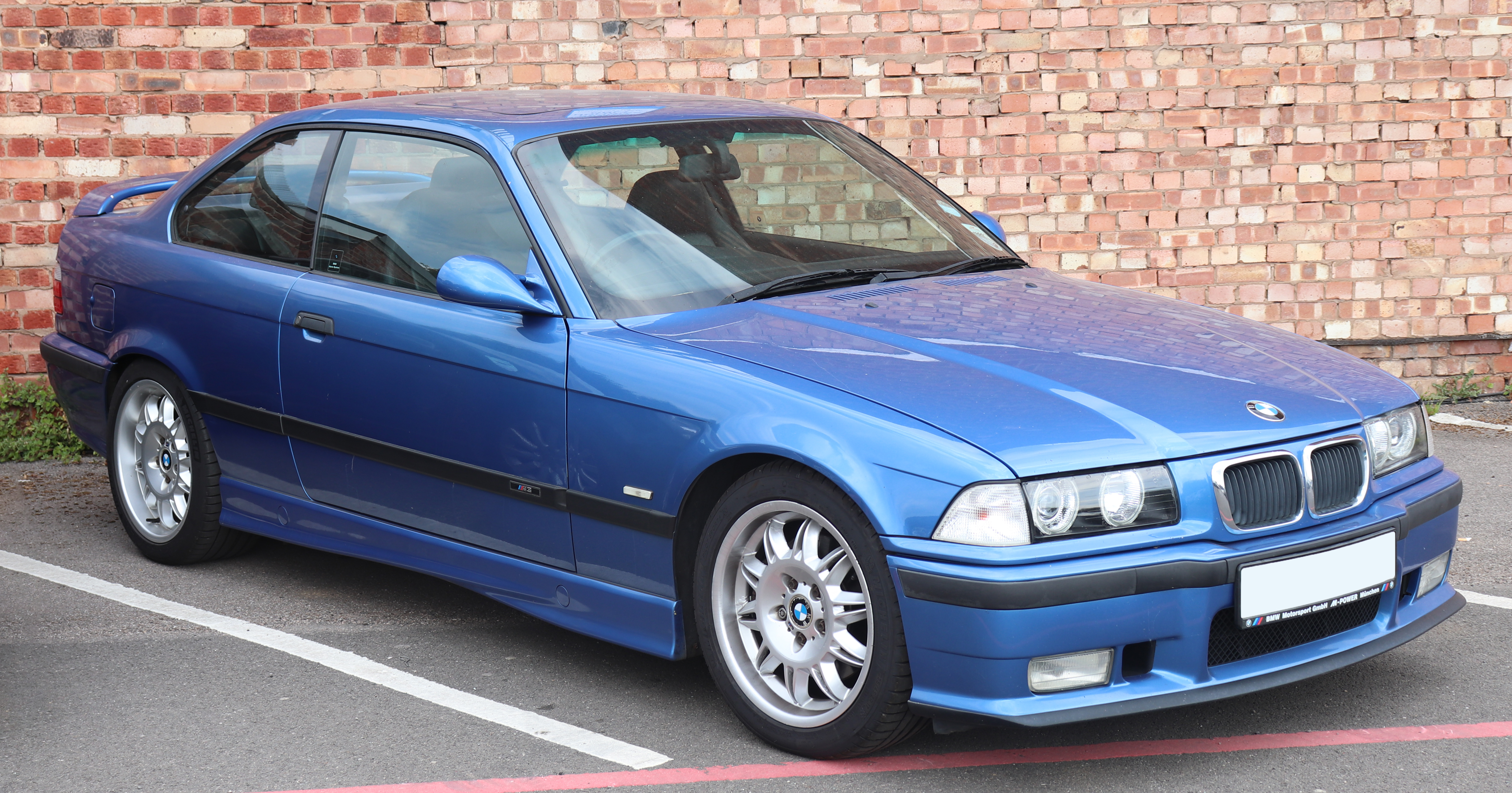

Overview
- Production: September 1992 – August 1999
- Designer: Claus Luthe

Body and chassis
- Body style: 2-door 2+2 coupé; 2-door convertible; 4-door saloon
- Layout: Front-engine, rear-wheel-drive
- Related: BMW 3 Series (E36)

Powertrain
- Engine: 3.0 L S50 I6 (pre-facelift); 3.0 L S50B30US I6 (pre-facelift US market); 3.2 L S50 I6 (post-facelift); 3.2 L S52 I6 (post-facelift US market)
- Transmission: 5-speed manual; 5-speed ZF 5HP automatic; 6-speed manual; 6-speed SMG

Dimensions
- Wheelbase: 2,700 mm (106.3 in)
- Length: 4,430 mm (174.4 in)
- Width: 1,710 mm (67.3 in)
- Height: 1,370 mm (53.9 in)
- Curb weight: 1,442 kg (3,180 lb)

The M3 model of the E36 3 Series was released in November 1992 and was initially available as a coupé only, with a convertible version added in 1994. A saloon version was also added in December 1994, to fill in the gap caused by the lack of the M5 saloon model between the end of E34 M5 production in 1995 and the launch of the E39 M5 in 1998.

In September 1995, a facelift version of the coupé was introduced. Changes included the engine displacement increasing to 3.2 L (195 cu in), the manual transmission upgrading from a 5-speed to a 6-speed, different wheels and clear indicator lenses. The facelift changes were applied to the saloon model in November 1995 and the convertible model in February 1996. The kerb weight of the 1996 M3 coupe in European specification is 1,515 kg (3,340 lb).

The facelift also saw the introduction of a 6-speed "SMG" automated manual transmission, the first time an automated transmission was available on an M3 outside the United States. The SMG transmission was praised for its fast shift times and operation in performance situations, but criticized for behavior in everyday driving situations.

In 1996, BMW M hand-built an E36 M3 Compact prototype as an M-car which would appeal to younger customers. It included various performance and styling features of the E36 M3, including the 3.2-litre S50 engine, mated with a body familiar to North American BMW customers as the "ti" body style. This prototype M3 Compact was reviewed in the German magazine "Auto Motor und Sport", but never reached production.

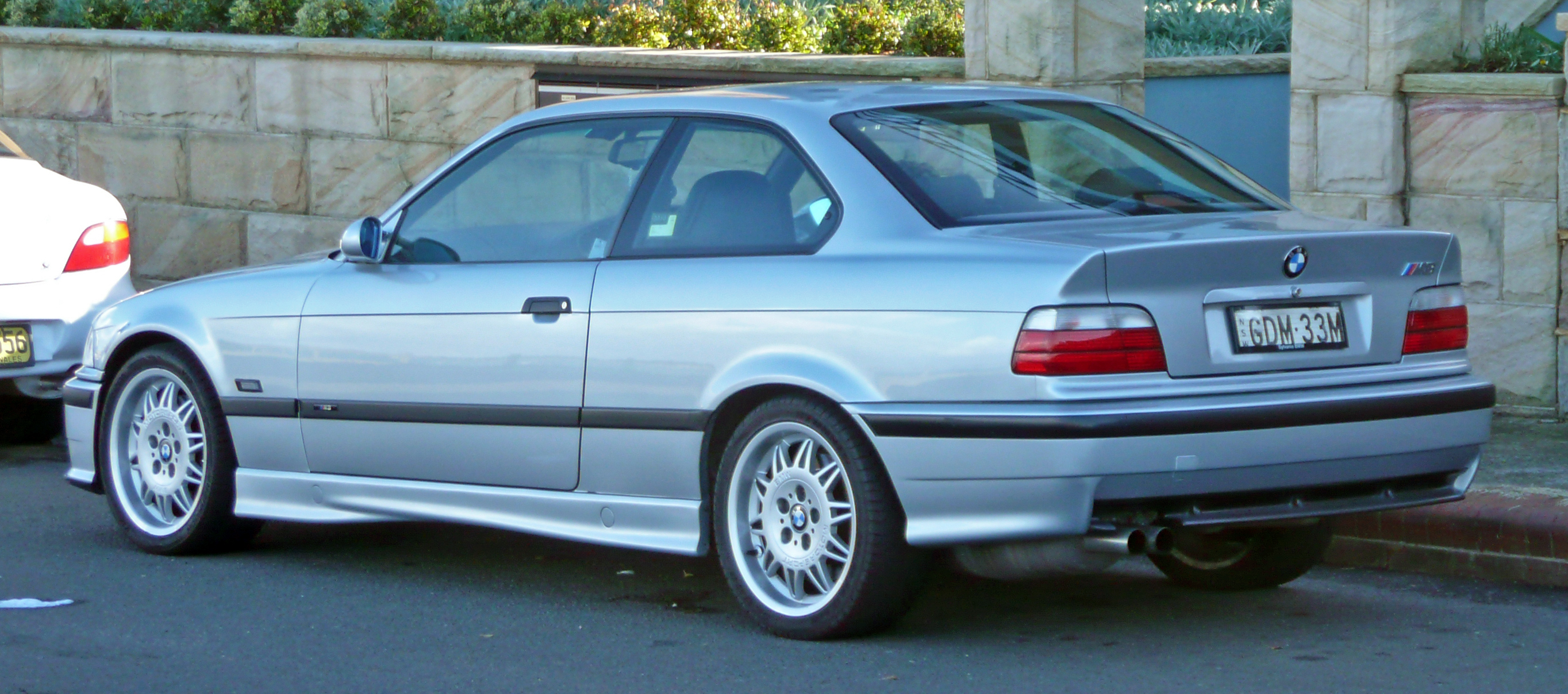
Coupé

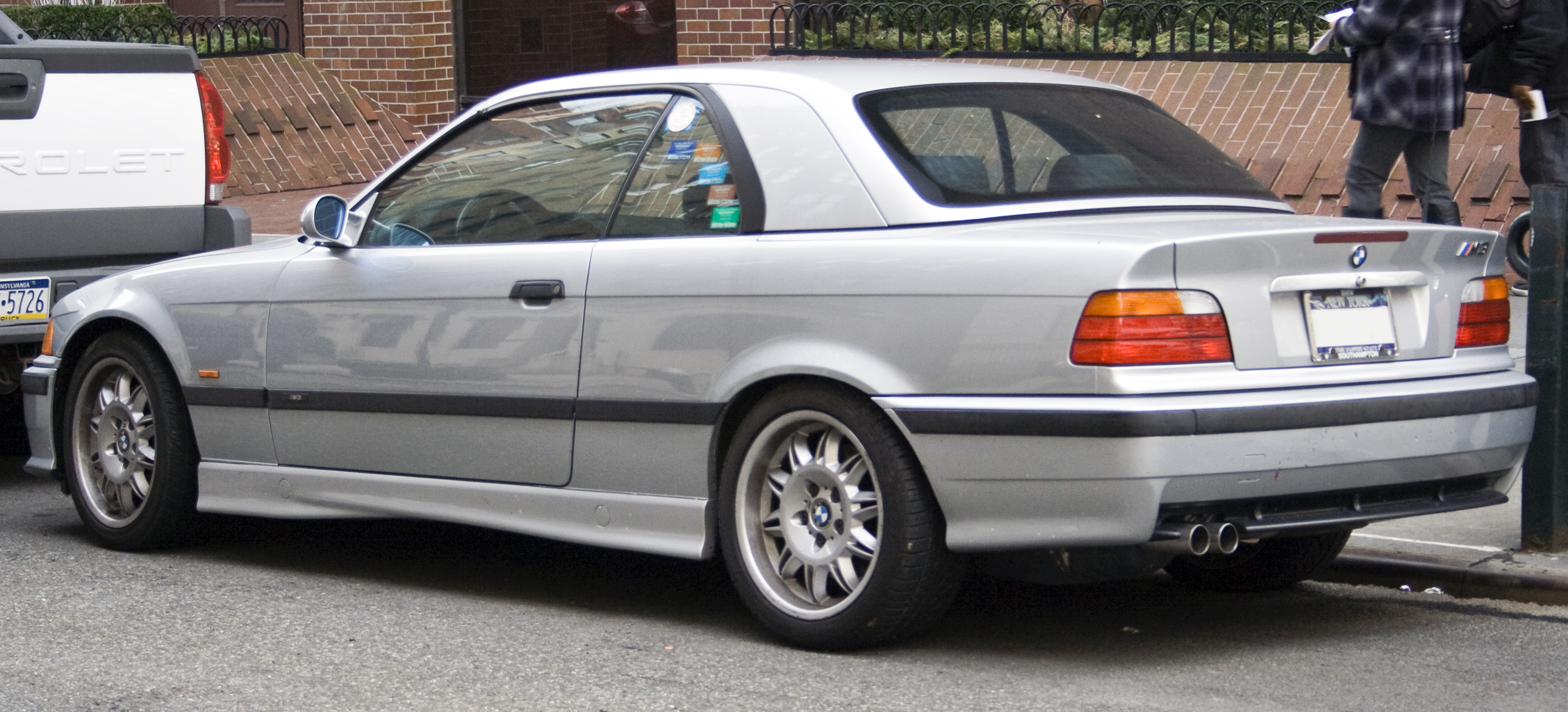
Convertible

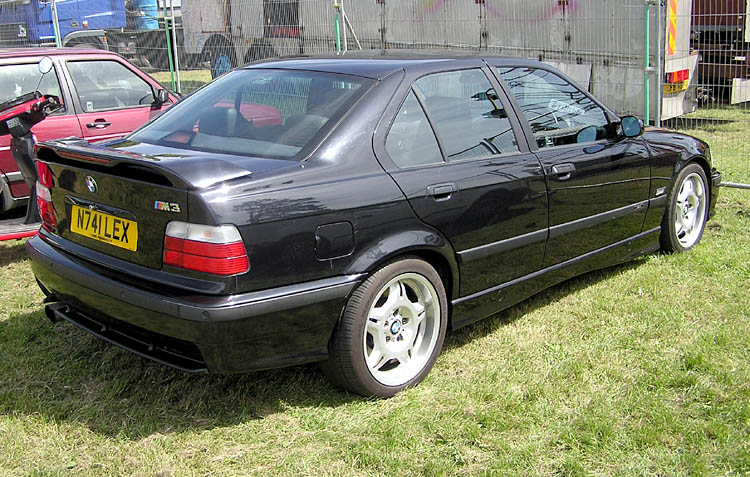
Saloon

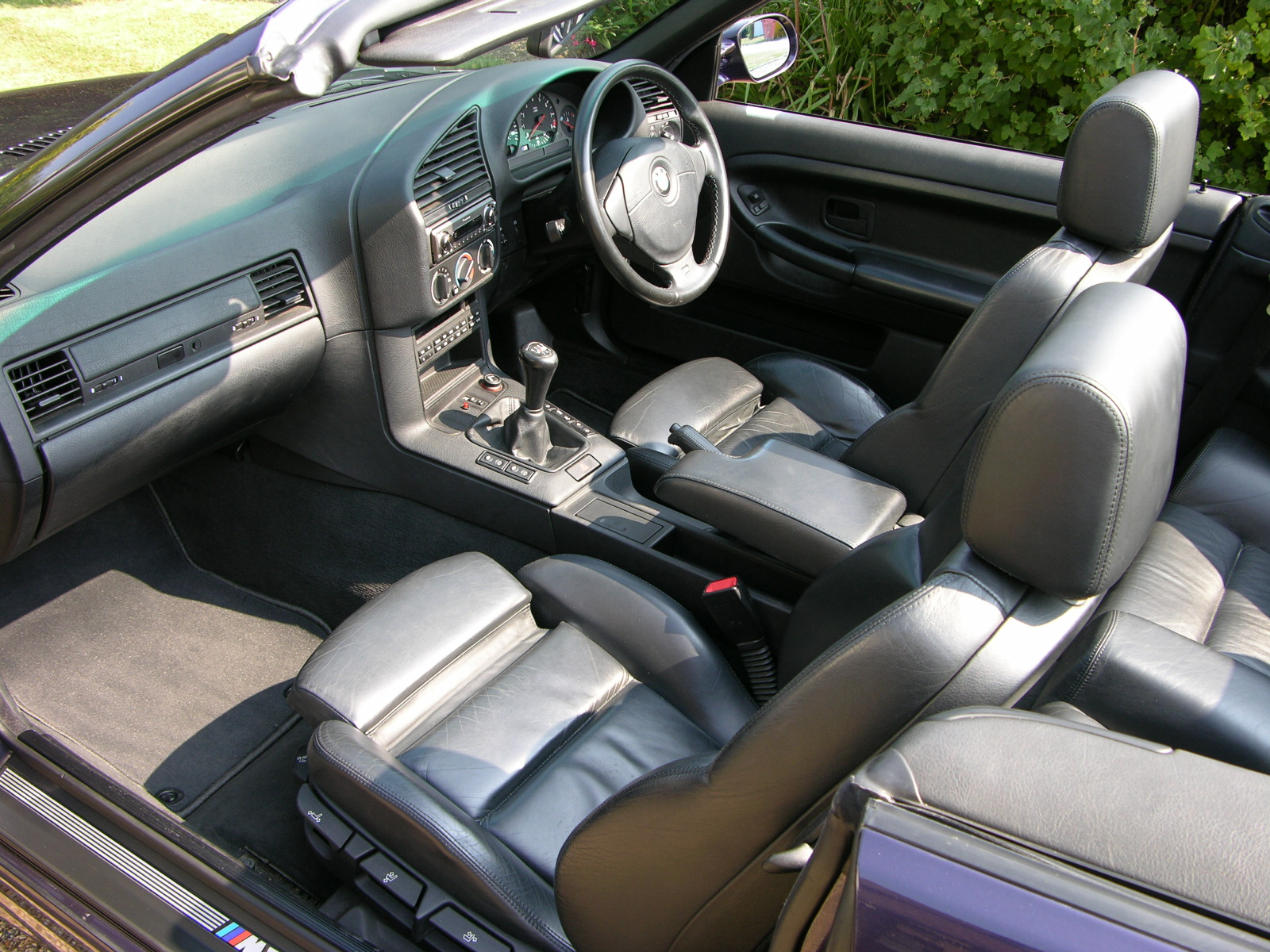
E36 M3 convertible interior

=== Engine ===
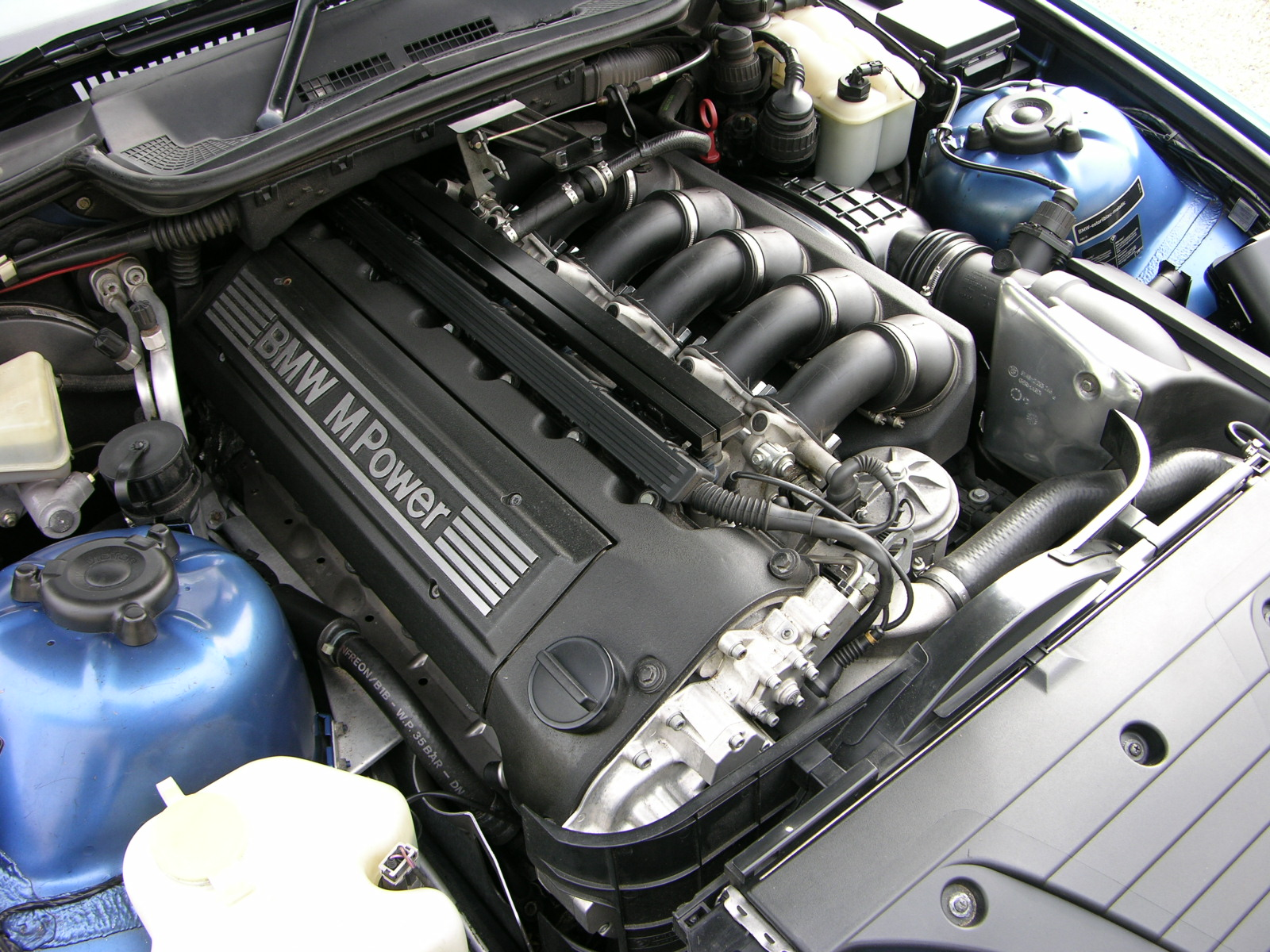
BMW S50 inline-6 engine

The E36 M3 is powered by the BMW S50 straight-six engine. It was the first M3 to use a six-cylinder engine, which has since been used in the majority of M3 models (albeit in turbocharged form since 2014).

In most countries, the initial 2,990 cc (182 cu in) version generated 210 kW (286 PS; 282 hp) at 7,000 rpm and 320 N⋅m (236 lb⋅ft) at 3,600 rpm. North American models (except for the limited edition Canadian "M3 Euro-Spec" model) used the less powerful BMW S50B30US engine instead, a 2,990 cc (182 cu in) engine which produced 179 kW (243 PS; 241 hp).

The facelift models in late 1995 were upgraded to a 3,201 cc (195 cu in) version of the BMW S50 engine, generating 236 kW (316 hp) at 7,400 rpm and 350 N⋅m (258 lbf⋅ft) at 3,250 rpm. North American models used the less powerful BMW S52B32 engine instead, a 3,152 cc (192 cu in) engine which continued to produce 179 kW (243 PS; 240 hp).

=== Special editions ===
==== M3 GT (Europe) ====
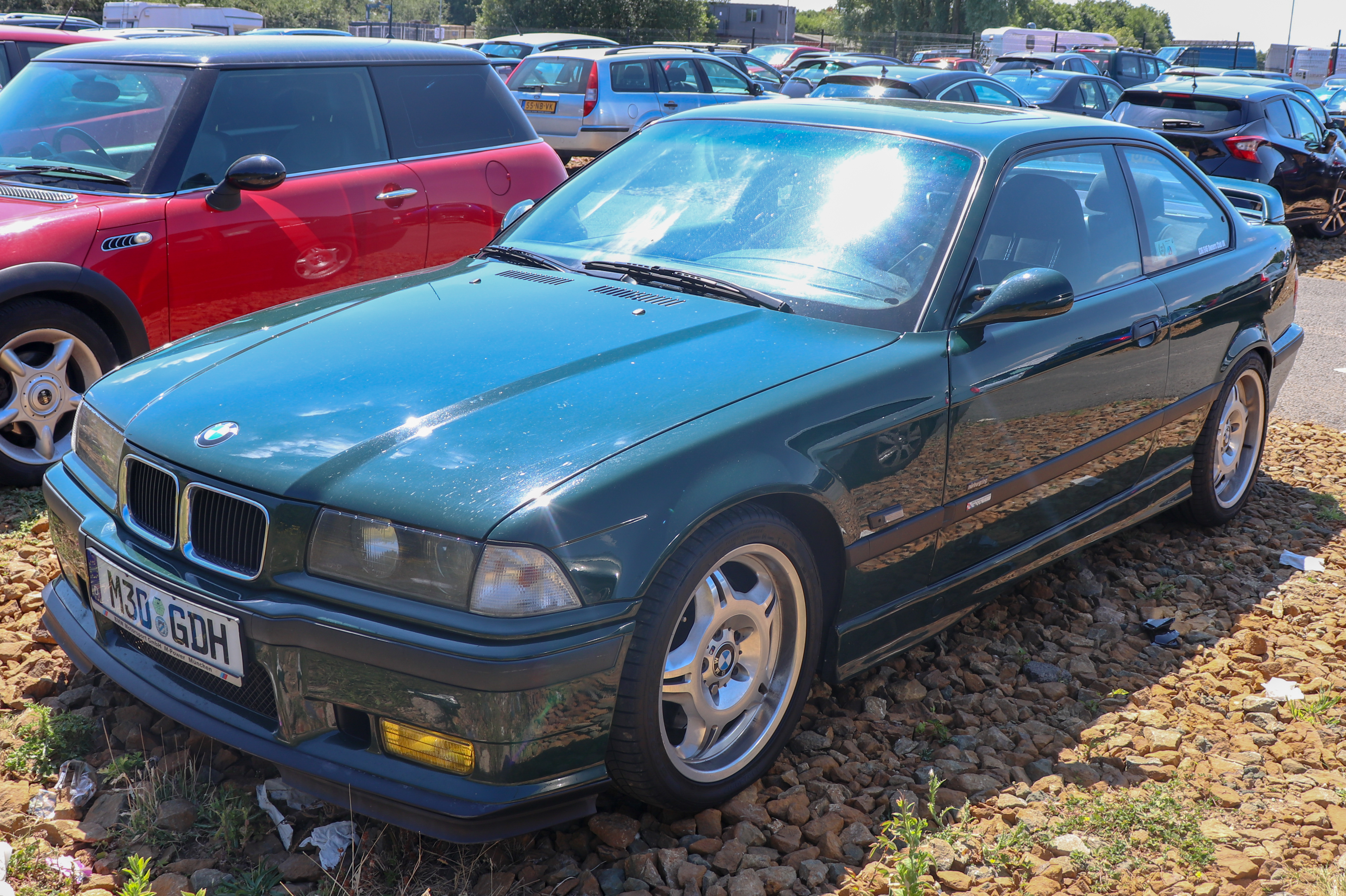
1995 BMW M3 GT

In 1994, BMW produced the limited-edition M3 GT as a racing homologation special for Europe, in order to compete in the FIA-GT class II, IMSA GT and international long-distance races. A total of 356 cars were produced, all in left-hand drive for mainland Europe. The UK received a special GT trim limited to 50 cars with only the cosmetic upgrades of the homologation special.

The engine was the European-specification S50B30, which was upgraded with larger camshafts and a higher compression ratio, resulting in peak power of 220 kW (295 hp) at 7,100 rpm.

All M3 GTs only came in one single colour, "British Racing Green". Other changes include a deeper and adjustable front splitter, higher rear double wing, aluminum doors, wheels measuring 17 x 7.5 inches at the front and 17 x 8.5 inches at the rear, stiffer front suspension, a cross-brace and a strut brace. The M3 GT is approximately 30 kg (66 lb) lighter than the regular M3 and has a derestricted top speed of 275 km/h (171 mph).

==== M3 Evolution Imola Individual ====
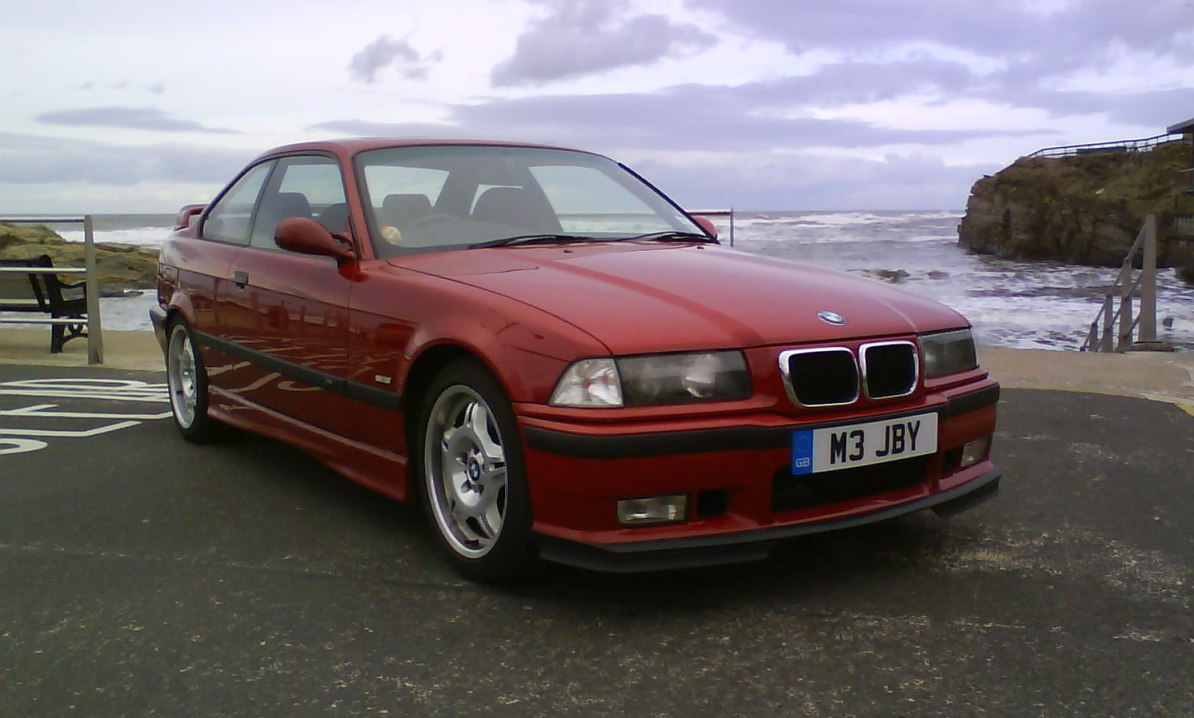
1998 BMW M3 Evolution Imola Individual

The M3 Evolution Imola Individual is a limited-edition variant of the M3 (50 for the United Kingdom). The engine and performance characteristics of the car were unchanged from the 1996 European M3, and a special exterior and interior colour combination was chosen by BMW UK: "Imola Red" (405) paint with Nappa leather seats in Imola Red and Amaretta suede bolsters in anthracite. It also included side airbags, the M3 GT Class II rear spoiler, front class II corner splitter extensions, electric seats, and double-spoke polished alloy wheels.

Prior to the release of the Imola Individual there was a pre-production model made which was used as the basis of the special edition. It featured the Class II front splitter and rear spoiler, special order Imola Red paint, special order Nappa leather and Anthracite Amaretta suede interior, SMG gearbox, GSM phone kit, headlamp washers and double-spoke polished alloy wheels.

==== M3 Lightweight (US Only) ====
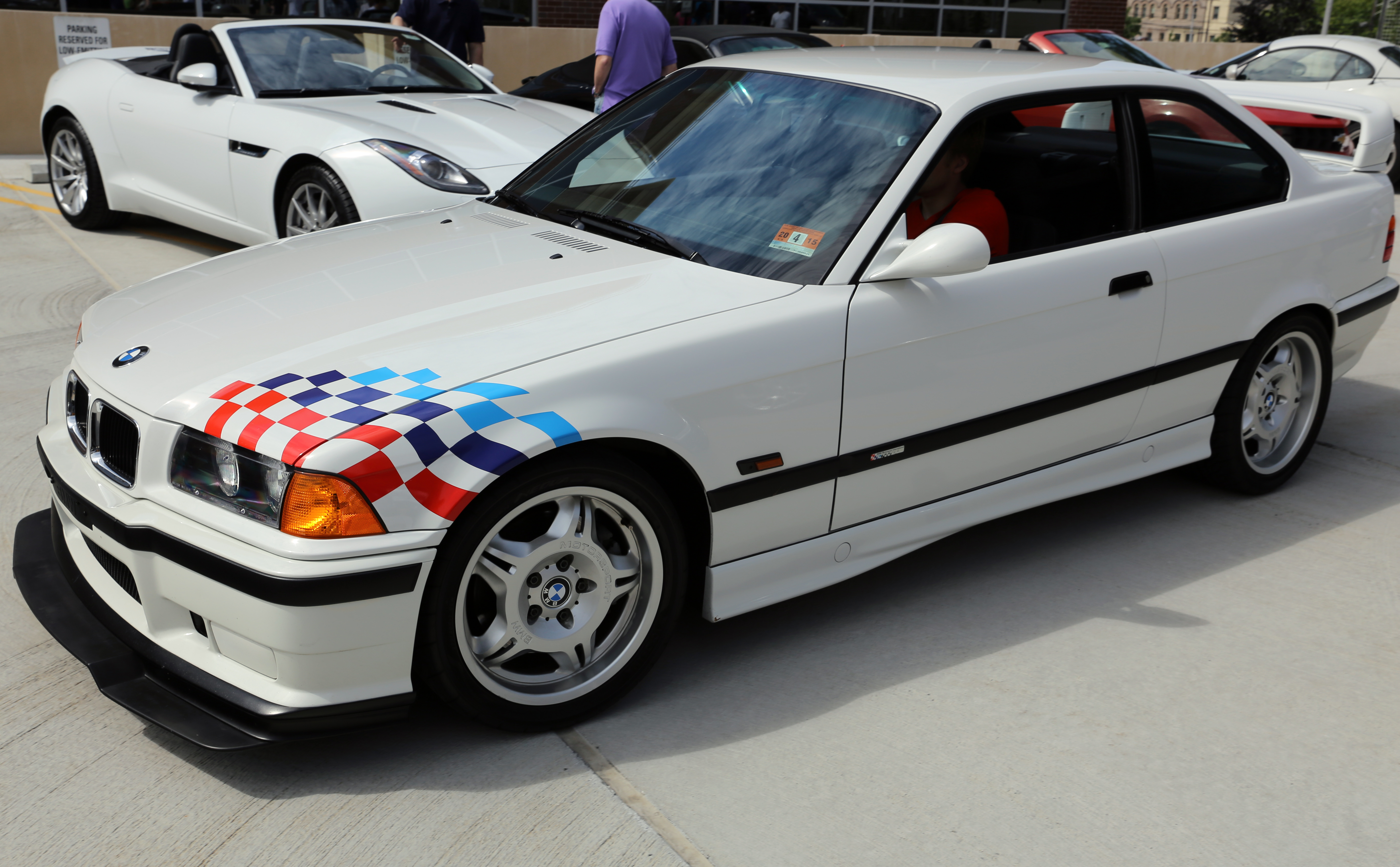
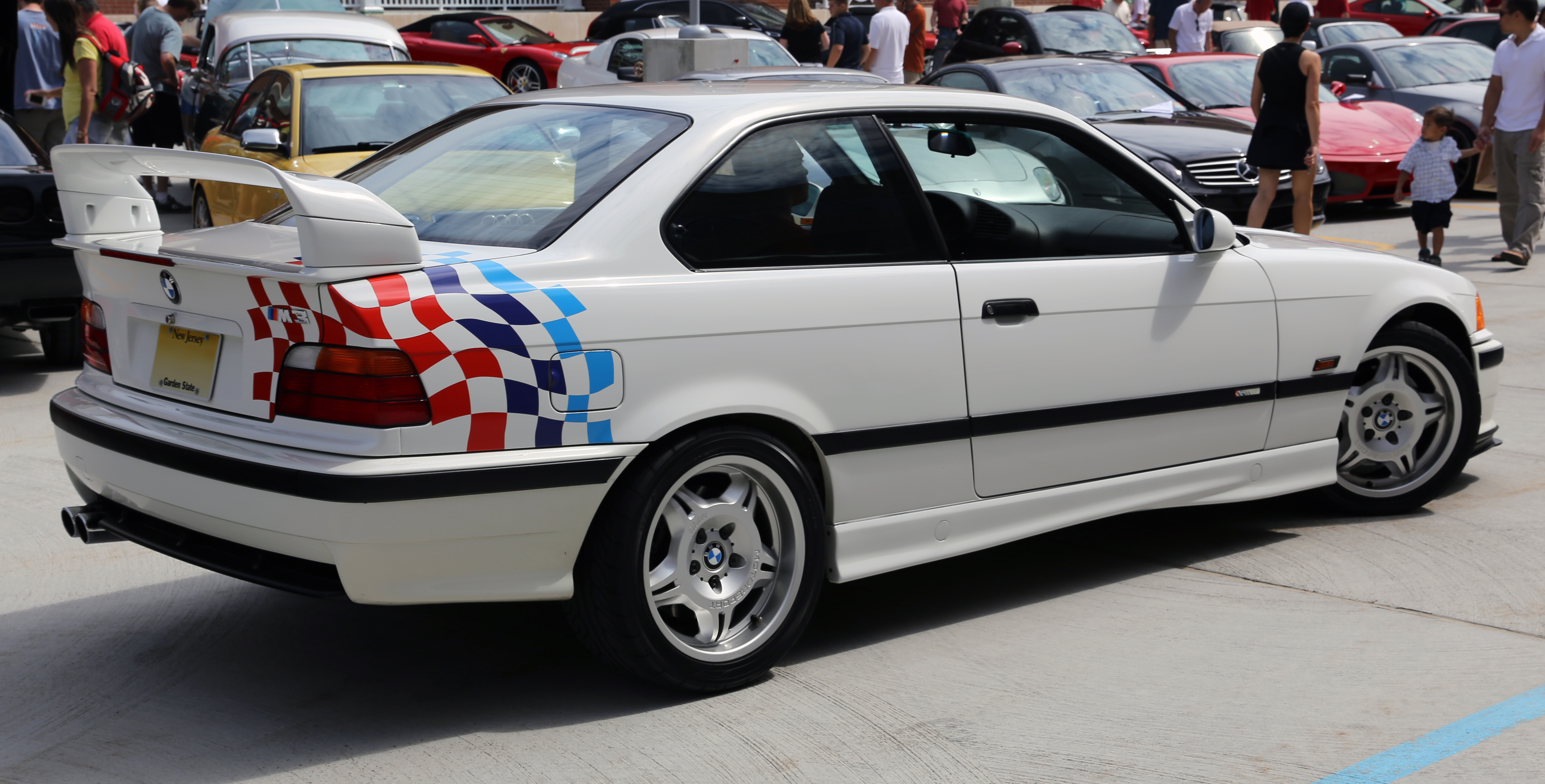
M3 Lightweight

Following the introduction of the E36 M3, racing teams in the United States began pressuring BMW for a homologation version in order to compete in sports-car racing. As a result, the 'M3 Lightweight' was introduced in 1995. The cars came without a radio (although the speakers were installed and the car pre-wired for the radio), air conditioning, leather seats, tool kit or a sunroof. The doors have aluminium skins. There is no under bonnet insulation blanket, and the boot only has carpet on the floor. The under body insulation is thinner and there is special carpeting to lower weight. Overall the changes resulted in a weight 91 kg (200 lb) less than a regular M3. The wheels are 17 inches in diameter, with a width of 7.5 inches at the front and 8.5 inches at the rear. The tyres fitted were 235/40ZR17.

Powertrain changes included the removal of the top speed limiter and a shorter differential ratio (3.23 compared to 3.15). Suspension upgrades consisted of shorter springs from the European-specification M3. Before being sold, the M3 Lightweights were sent to Prototype Technology Group Racing in Virginia for final preparation, which included the front and rear Motorsport flag decals, and "trunk kit". In the boot there was a dual-pickup oil pump (from the European-specification M3), front strut bar, lower cross-brace, spacer blocks to raise the rear wing, and an adjustable front splitter. Each owner was given a 1-page legal document to sign acknowledging that any installation of boot items voided the new car warranty.

All M3 Lightweight cars were produced in the "Alpine White" exterior colour, with the Motorsports flag decals on the left front and right rear corners of the car. There is a fixed wing on the bootlid, some carbon fibre interior trim, and the badges on the side moulding and dash read "BMW Motorsport International".

Although BMW promised to build approximately 100 cars, BMW never released the production numbers of M3 Lightweights built. However, it is estimated that approximately 125 were built.

==== Canadian Edition ====
Prior to the release of the North American specification M3, BMW Canada sold 45 of the European specification M3s. At the time, BMW North America was opposed to importing the E36 M3 (due to its high price and the poor sales of the previous M3). The Canadian Edition M3 was imported using a loophole that allows low volumes of Norwegian-certified cars to be sold in Canada. Despite a high price of nearly $60,000 CAD, all 45 cars were sold in 3 days. 42 of the M3s arrived in Canada via boat in January 1994, with the final 3 cars shipping sometime in the following few months. As with other European specification M3s, these 45 cars had the 213 kW (286 hp) version of the S50 engine, oil temperature gauge and glass headlights, as well as Canadian-required equipment such as a third brake light and daytime running lights. Each of the Canadian Edition cars has an individually-numbered plaque on the inside of the glovebox which reads "S50 B30 Limited Production Canadian Edition" as well as a special owners manual pouch with a similar plaque. The cars were numbered at random, with no correlation to VIN numbers, options or production date.

When the North American specification M3 was released in 1995, it was initially not available in Canada. Sales of the North American M3 in Canada began in 1997.

==== M3-R (Australia) ====
In order to race in the Australian Super Production series, fifteen M3-Rs were sold by BMW Australia in 1994. With a power output of 240 kW (322 hp), the M3-R is the most powerful production E36 M3. Four of the cars were used for the race series, while the remaining eleven were sold to the general public. Buyers were required to possess a CAMS motorsport licence in order to purchase an M3-R.

The cars were delivered to the workshop of the Frank Gardner racing team for final preparation. A bolt-in FIA-approved roll cage was a factory option. Suspension upgrades consisted of new springs, adjustable struts and rear perches. Engine upgrades consisted of AC Schnitzer camshafts, dual pickup sump, an oil restrictor in the head and a cold air snorkel into the air filter box replacing the left hand foglight.

Other changes included four piston front brake calipers, a shorter (3.25:1) differential ratio, the driveshaft from the M5, a twin-plate clutch, a non-functional rear seat, no air conditioning, a deeper front splitter and a larger rear spoiler. The cars were individually numbered with a plaque fitted to the centre console near the handbrake.

==== M3 GTR (Germany) ====
The E36 M3 GTR is the road-going version of the competition machine built to compete in the 1993 ADAC German GT Cup series. In 1993, a single road-going example was made. It featured a widebody kit, stripped interior, seam-welded body, upgraded suspension, and a stroked (from 2,990 to 3,018 cc) engine.

=== Production ===
Production of the E36 M3 began in September 1992 and was discontinued in August 1999.

The majority of cars were produced at the BMW Regensburg factory in Germany; however, a small number of low compression right-hand drive cars were assembled at BMW's plant in Rosslyn, South Africa. In total, 46,525 coupés, 12,114 convertibles, and 12,603 saloons were produced. The saloon ceased production in December 1997, the coupé in late 1998, and the convertible in December 1999.

=== North American models ===
Despite being released in other countries in 1992, the E36 M3 was not sold in the United States until 1995. A key difference between the "European specification" M3 (sold in the rest of the world) and the US M3 is the less powerful S50B30US engine used in the US M3, which was rated at 179 kW (240 hp) and 305 N⋅m (225 lb⋅ft). Other notable differences included an optional 5-speed ZF 5HP torque-converter automatic transmission, suspension changes, and single piece brake discs (instead of floating discs). The changes were made in order to reduce the price of the M3, as the US dealers believed the European specification M3 would be too expensive to sell well.

In November 1996, the engine was upgraded to the 3.2 L (195 cu in) BMW S52B32, with the same power outputs of 179 kW (240 hp), but with torque increased to 320 N⋅m (236 lbf⋅ft). The manual gearbox remained a 5-speed, despite the European versions being upgraded to a 6-speed version.

US sales figures include a total of 18,961 coupés, 7,760 saloon and 6,211 convertibles.

=== Motorsport ===
The introduction of the E36 M3 coincided with BMW's withdrawal from the Deutsche Tourenwagen Meisterschaft (DTM), resulting in BMW focussing instead on the 318i and 320i models in the Super Tourenwagen Cup. Nonetheless, the E36 M3 competed in many motorsport events. In 1993, the E36 M3 GTR won the German ADAC GT Cup, driven by Johnny Cecotto. The M3 GT competed in the European FIA GT Championship.

In the United States, the Prototype Technology Group (PTG) Racing in Virginia ran the E36 M3 in the IMSA GT Championship. In the 1996 IMSA GT Championship, the M3 won 4 races in the GTS-2 class and BMW won the manufacturer's championship. In the 1997 IMSA GT Championship, the M3 won 8 races in the GTS-3 class, with BMW winning the manufacturer's championship again and Bill Auberlen winning the driver's championship. In the 1998 IMSA GT Championship, the M3 won 5 races and BMW won the manufacturer's championship in the GT3 class. The same year, the M3 won 4 races in the GT2 class. The M3 also competed in the 2000 American Le Mans Series, taking one win in the GT class.

In Australia, the M3-R competed in the Australian GT Production Car Championship.

== E46 generation (2000–2006) ==
BMW M3 (E46)
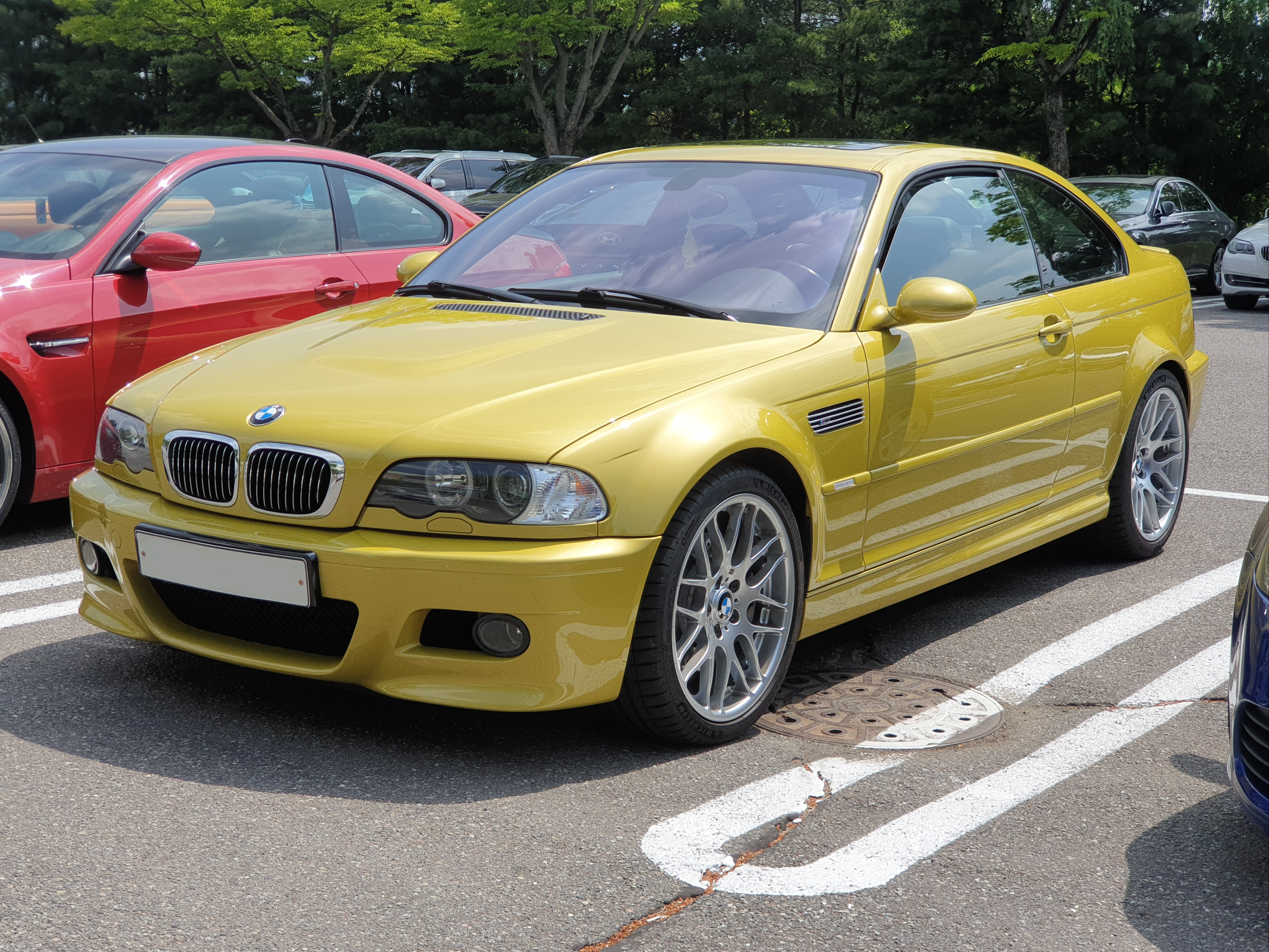

Overview
- Production: September 2000 – August 2006
- Designer: Ulf Weidhase

Body and chassis
- Body style: 2-door 2+2 coupé; 2-door convertible
- Layout: Front-engine, rear-wheel-drive
- Related: BMW 3 Series (E46)

Powertrain
- Engine: 3.2 L S54B32 I6; 4.0 L P60B40 V8 (M3 GTR)
- Transmission: 6-speed manual; 6-speed SMG-II

Dimensions
- Wheelbase: 2,720 mm (107.1 in)
- Length: 4,490 mm (176.8 in)
- Width: 1,780 mm (70.1 in)
- Height: 1,370 mm (53.9 in)
- Curb weight: 1,560 kg (3,450 lb)

The M3 version of the E46 3 Series was produced in coupé and convertible body styles. The E46 M3 is powered by the S54 straight-six engine and has a 0–100 km/h (62 mph) acceleration time of 5.2 seconds for the coupé, with either the manual or SMG-II transmission and 4.9 seconds for the CSL model. The skidpad cornering results are 0.89 g for the coupé and 0.81 g for the convertible. The top speed is electronically limited to 250 km/h (155 mph). The kerb weight is 1,565 kg (3,450 lb).

The available transmissions were a Getrag 420G 6-speed manual transmission or an SMG-II 6-speed automated manual transmission, which was based on the Getrag 420G. The SMG-II used an electrohydraulically actuated clutch, and gear shifts could be selected via the shift lever or paddles mounted on the steering wheel. The SMG-II was praised for its fast shift times and racetrack performance, but some people found its shifts to be delayed and lurching in stop-start traffic.

Total production of the E46 M3 was 56,133 coupés and 29,633 convertibles. The cars were assembled at the BMW Regensburg factory in Germany, and production was from September 2000 until August 2006, for a total of 85,766 cars.

An M3 Touring station wagon prototype was built to evaluate the feasibility of building an M3 model on the existing platform of the E46 station wagon (especially the integration of the M3's wider rear wheel arches onto the wagon body). The prototype did not reach production.

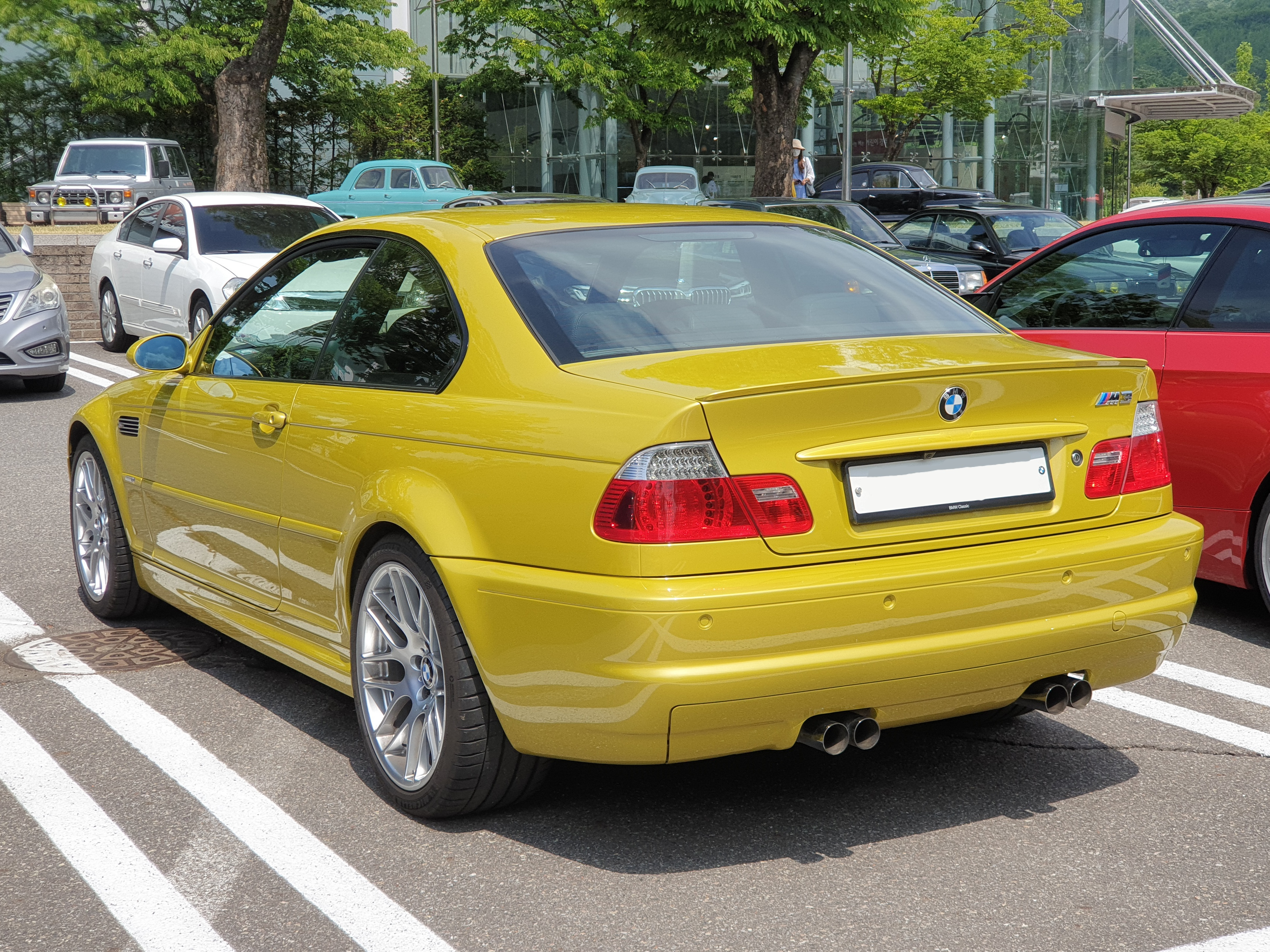
Coupé

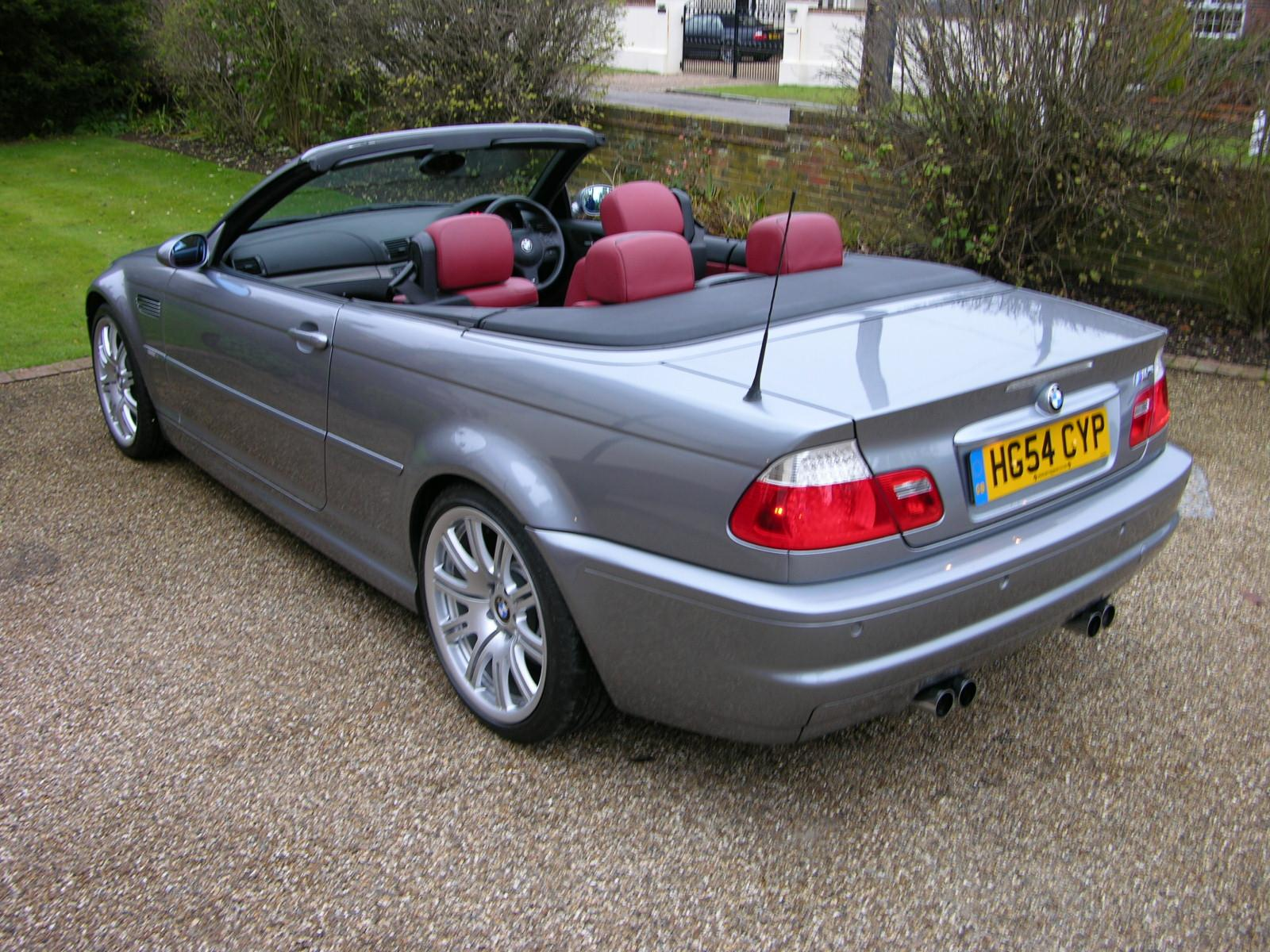
Convertible

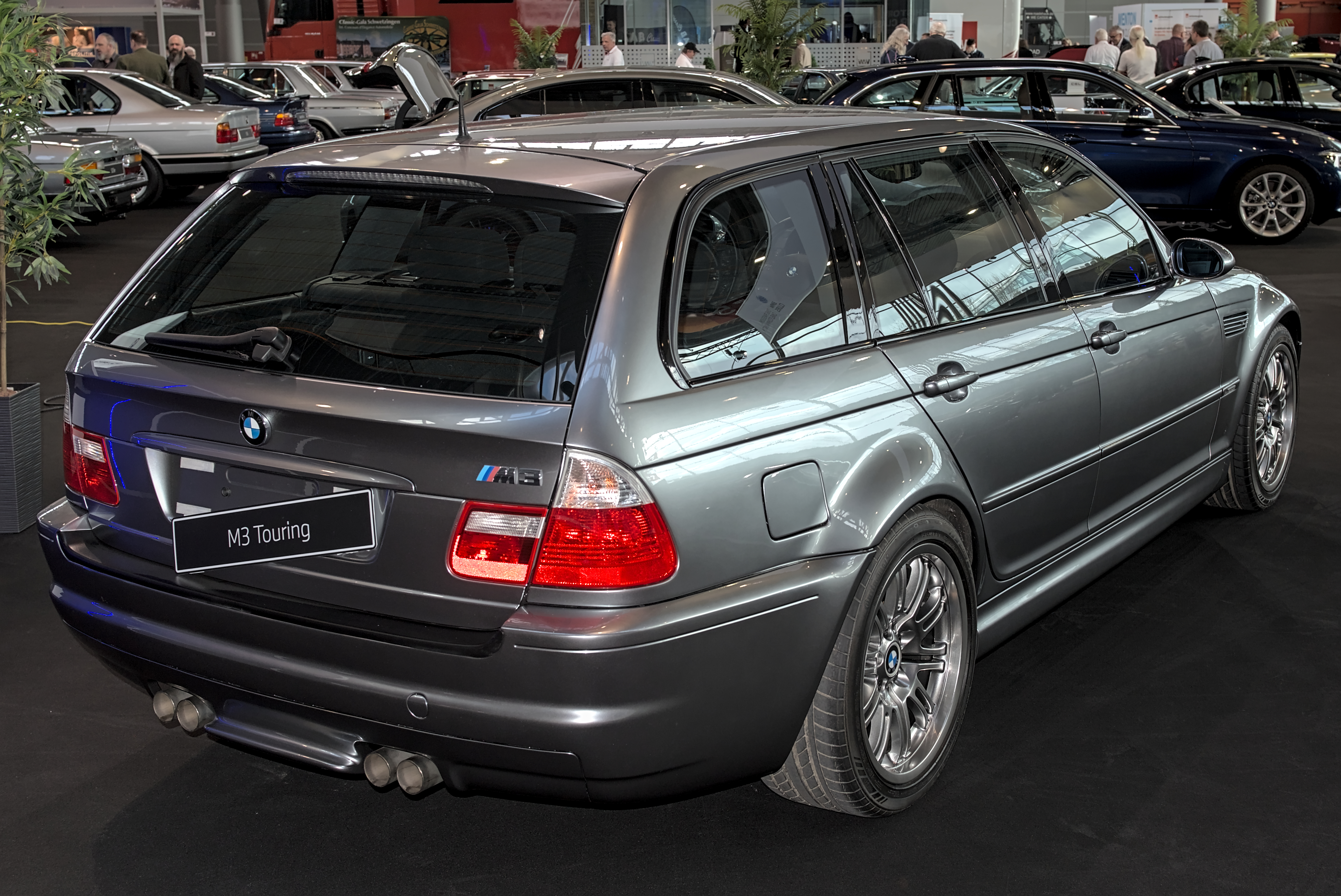
Touring prototype

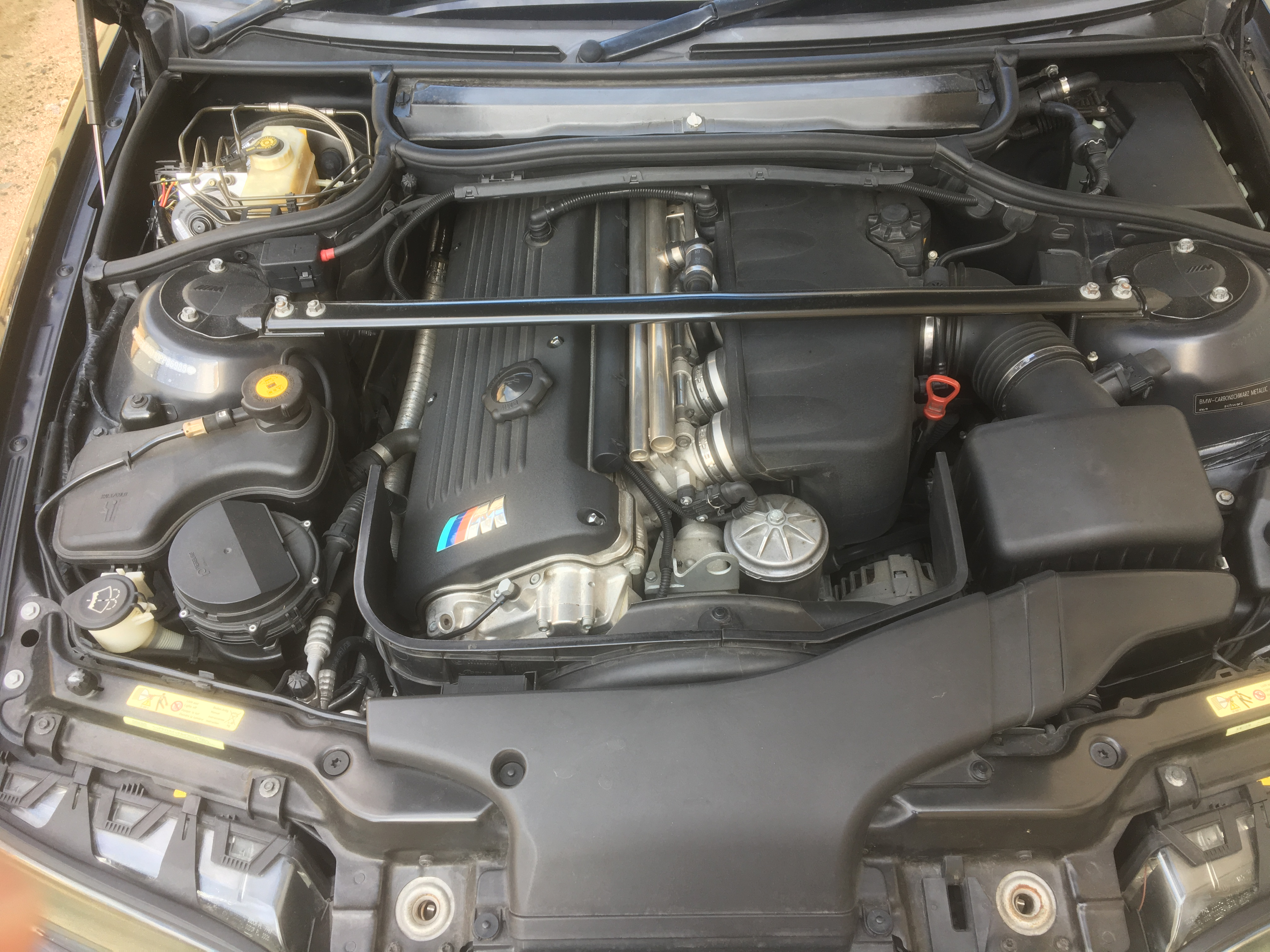
BMW S54 straight-six engine

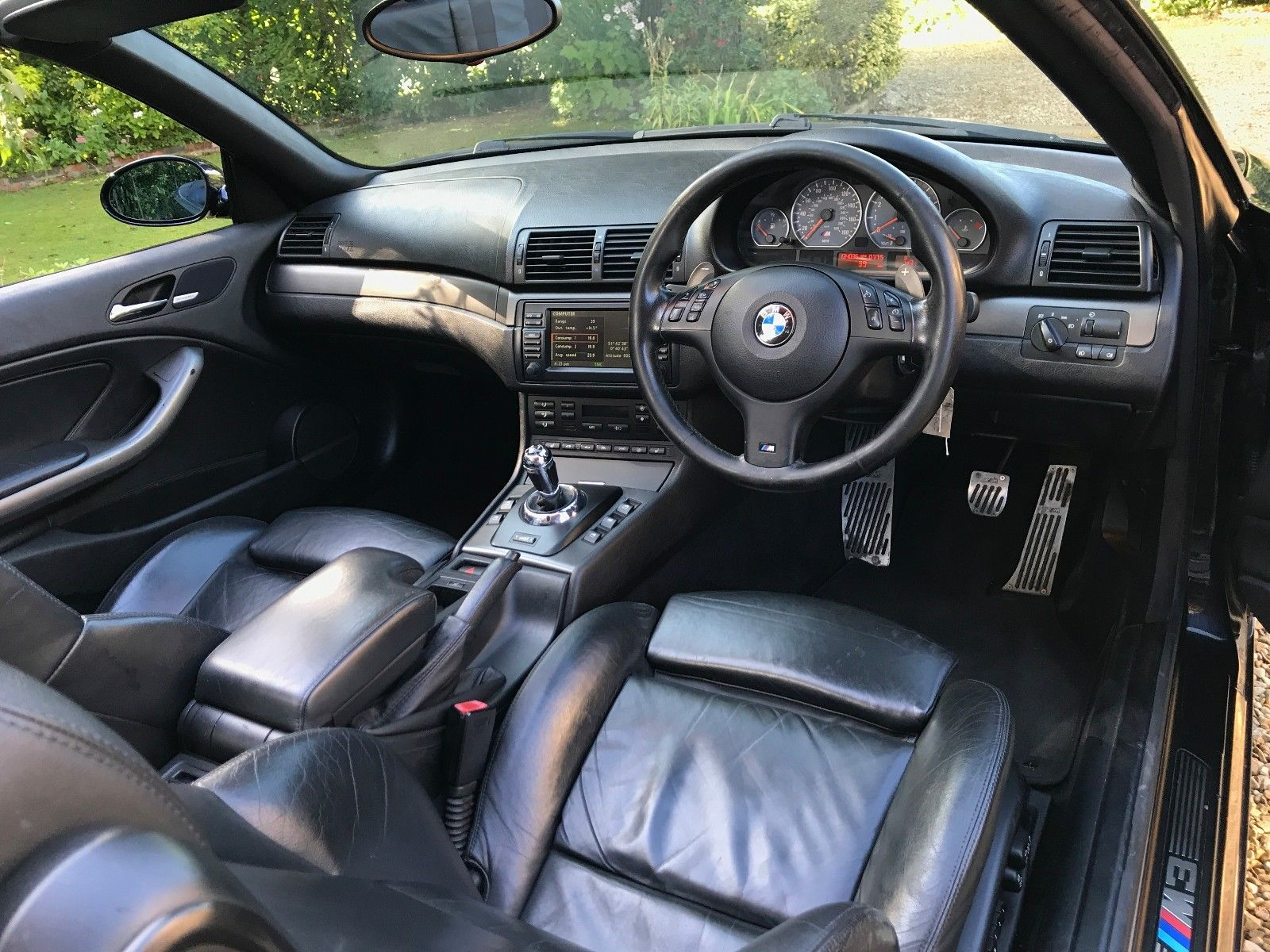
E46 M3 interior

=== Engine ===
The 3.2 L (200 cu in) S54 engine is the final evolution of the BMW S50 naturally aspirated straight-six engine. The S54 is rated at 252 kW (343 PS; 338 hp) at 7,900 rpm, 365 N⋅m (269 lb⋅ft) at 4,900 rpm, and has a redline of 8,000 rpm. As with most M engines, the S54 has individual throttle bodies for each cylinder, with electronic throttle control (drive-by-wire) operation of the throttles being a new feature for the S54.

=== Development and launch ===
Concept design of the M3 began in 1997. The head of exterior design was Ulf Weidhase and the head of interior design was Martina Bachmann.

The M3 was previewed at the 1999 International Motor Show Germany as a concept, resembling the final production version very closely. The final production version was first introduced in March 2000 at the Geneva Motor Show, with the new 3.2 L S54 M-tuned inline-6 engine.

=== Special editions ===
==== CSL ====
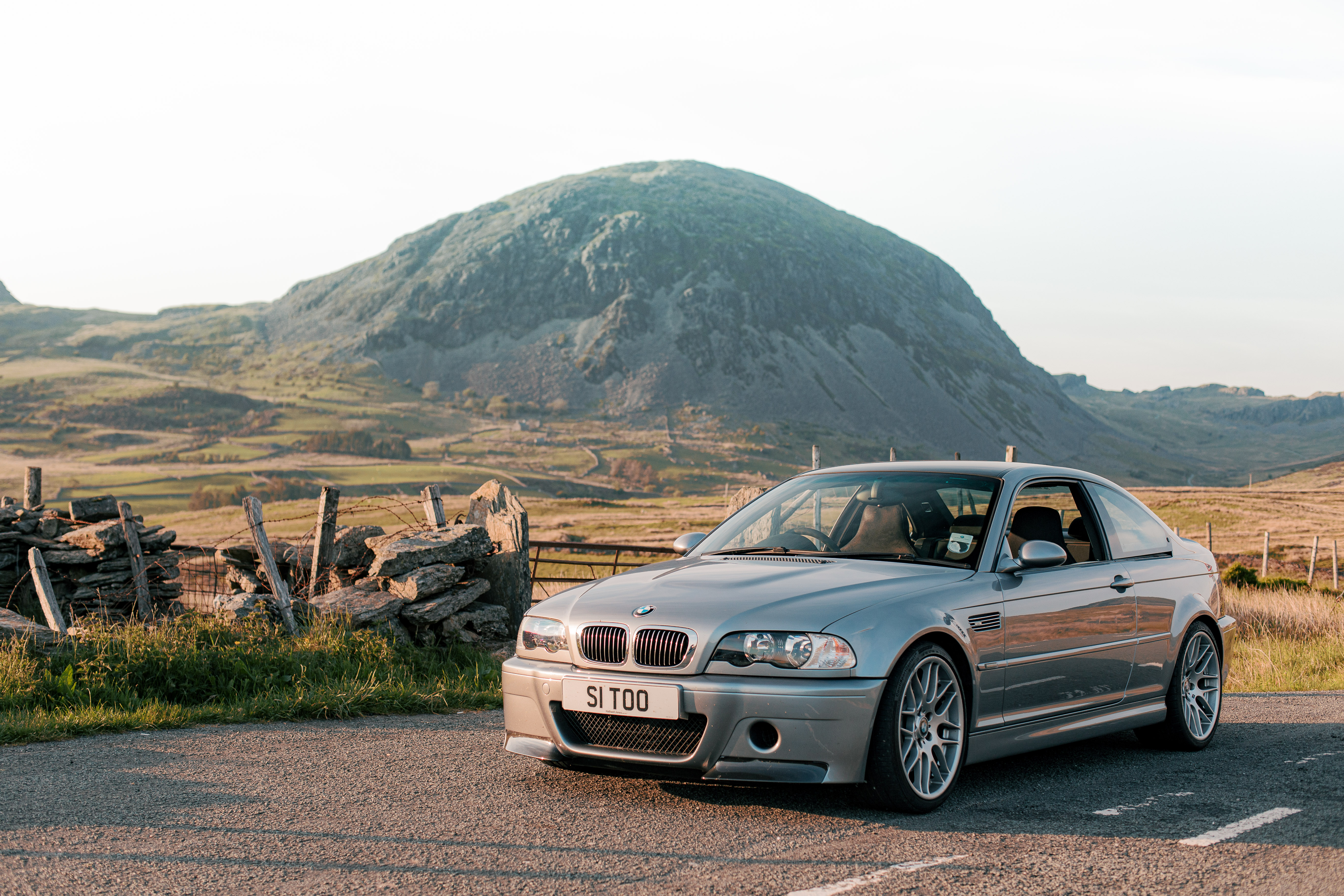
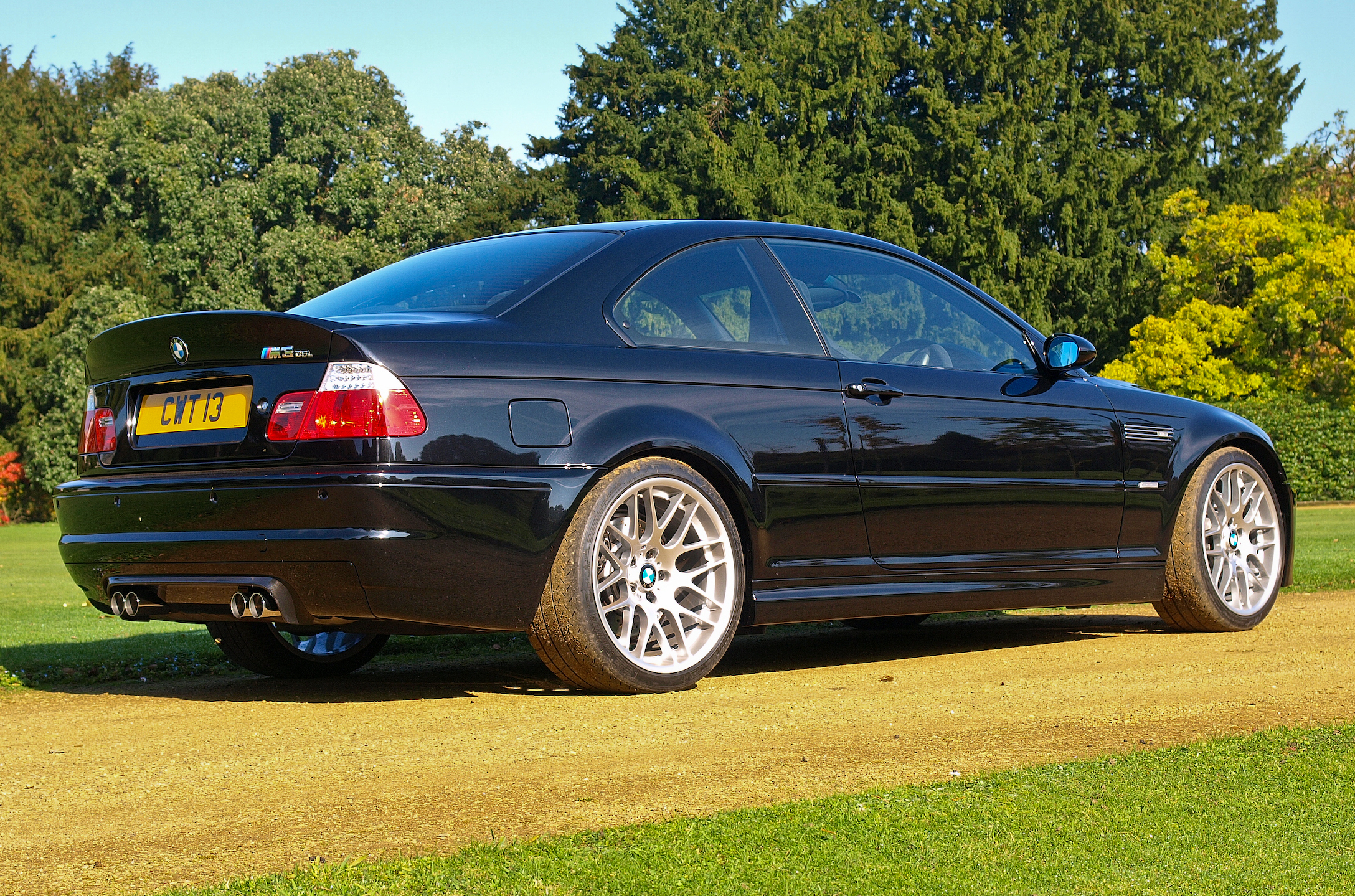
M3 CSL

The BMW M3 CSL (Coupe Sport Leichtbau, meaning 'Coupé Sport Lightweight') is a limited-edition version of the M3 that was produced in 2004, with production totaling to 1,383 cars. It was available in two colours: "Silver Grey Metallic" and "Black Sapphire Metallic".

As its name suggests, an emphasis was put on reducing weight. The CSL has a curb weight of 1,385 kg (3,053 lb), 110 kg (243 lb) lighter than the regular M3. Structural weight reduction measures include the use of glass-reinforced plastics in various structural points in the car, a roof constructed from carbon fibre reinforced plastic (reducing kerb weight by 7 kg (15 lb) and, more importantly, lowering the centre of gravity), body panels constructed from carbon fibre and thinner glass for the rear window.

The boot floor cover was made of lightweight fibre-board. The CSL discarded a large proportion of the M3's sound insulation, electric seats, navigation system, air conditioning, and stereo (the latter two were able to be re-added as no-cost options). The interior includes fibreglass front racing bucket seats, a fibreglass backing for the rear seats, and carbon fibre for the centre console, door panels, door trim, and head-liner. The steering wheel has just a single button which activates the M track mode, instead of the buttons for cruise control, stereo, and phone controls on the regular M3. The CSL retained the 50:50 weight distribution of the regular M3.

The wheels were increased in size to 19 inches. BMW took the unusual approach of supplying the CSL with semi-slick tyres (Michelin Pilot Sport Cup). These tyres provided high grip levels once warmed up on a racetrack, but poor performance on wet roads and when below their operating temperature. A warning label was included in the CSL to inform drivers about driving in cold or wet conditions. The brakes were upgraded with larger floating discs at the front and larger pistons at the rear.

The suspension system was revised with stiffer springs, upgraded shock absorbers and a quicker ratio for the steering rack (14.5:1 vs 15.4:1 on the regular M3). The electronic stability control was retuned and an "M track mode" was added, allowing higher thresholds before the system intervened.

The engine used in the CSL had increased output over the regular S54 by 13 kW (17 hp) and 5 N⋅m (4 lbf⋅ft) over the European M3. This is due to the use of sharper profile camshafts, a bigger air intake with carbon fibre manifold, a refinement of the exhaust manifold, and slightly different exhaust valves. The top speed was electronically limited as standard, but buyers with a current motorsport licence could order the CSL with the speed limiter removed. The sole transmission available was the 6-speed SMG II automated transmission, with revised software resulting in shift times of 80 milliseconds.

The aerodynamics were also revised, including a carbon fibre front splitter that improved downforce at high speeds by 50%, and a carbon fibre rear diffuser. The front bumper had a distinct hole that is used to draw cool air into the newly designed air intake. The bootlid was redesigned to incorporate a raised lip, unlike the regular M3 where one is simply added onto a flat boot.

==== Prototype CSL ====
In 2002, BMW M revealed a special V8 prototype engine (full model code S62B40) for the M3 CSL which was previously fitted to the E39 M5 and the E52 Z8. The S62 was BMW's first V8 engine to have double-VANOS (variable valve timing on the intake and exhaust camshafts). However, this prototype S62 engine produces 316 kW (430 PS; 424 hp) at 6,600 rpm and 500 N⋅m (369 lb⋅ft) at 3,800 rpm. The last difference results in a displacement of 3,999 cc (244.0 cu in), compared with the 4,941 cc (301.5 cu in) of the S62 engine found in the M5 and Z8 vehicles.

==== Competition Package / CS ====
In December 2004, a special edition was introduced which used several parts from the CSL. This model was called the M3 Competition Package (ZCP) in the United States and mainland Europe, and the M3 CS in the United Kingdom. Compared to the regular M3, the Competition Package includes:

- 19-inch BBS alloy wheels: 19 in×8 in at the front and 19 in×9.5 in at the rear.
- Stiffer springs (which were carried over to the regular M3 from 12/04).
- Faster ratio steering rack of 14.5:1 (compared with the regular M3's ratio of 15.4:1) as with the CSL
- Steering wheel from the CSL
- M-track mode for the electronic stability control, as with the CSL.
- The CSL's larger front brake discs (but with the regular M3 front calipers) and rear brake calipers with larger pistons.
- Alcantara steering wheel and handbrake covers.

The engine, gearbox, and other drivetrain components are the same as the standard M3.

==== GTR Straßenversion (Street Version) ====
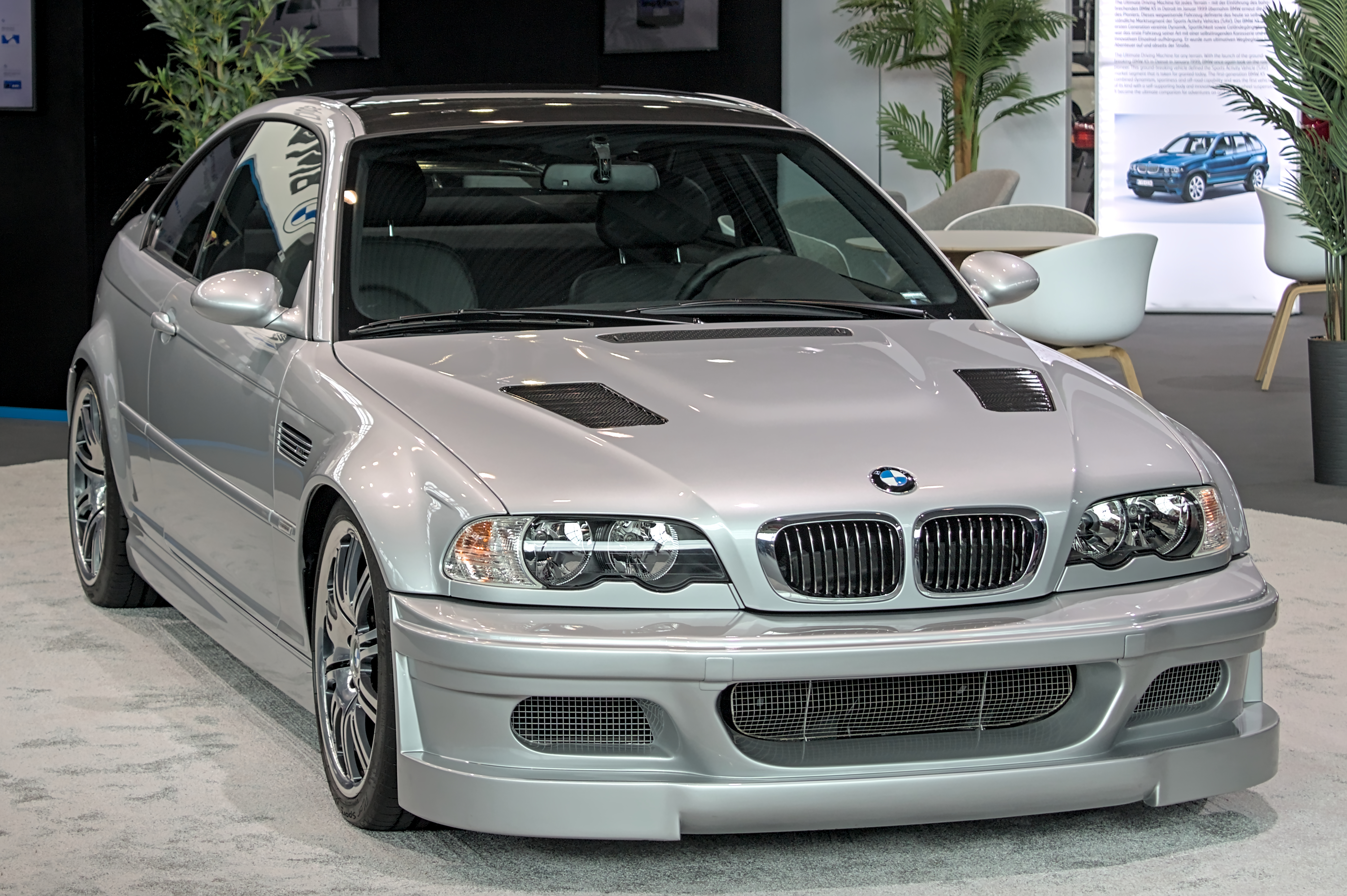
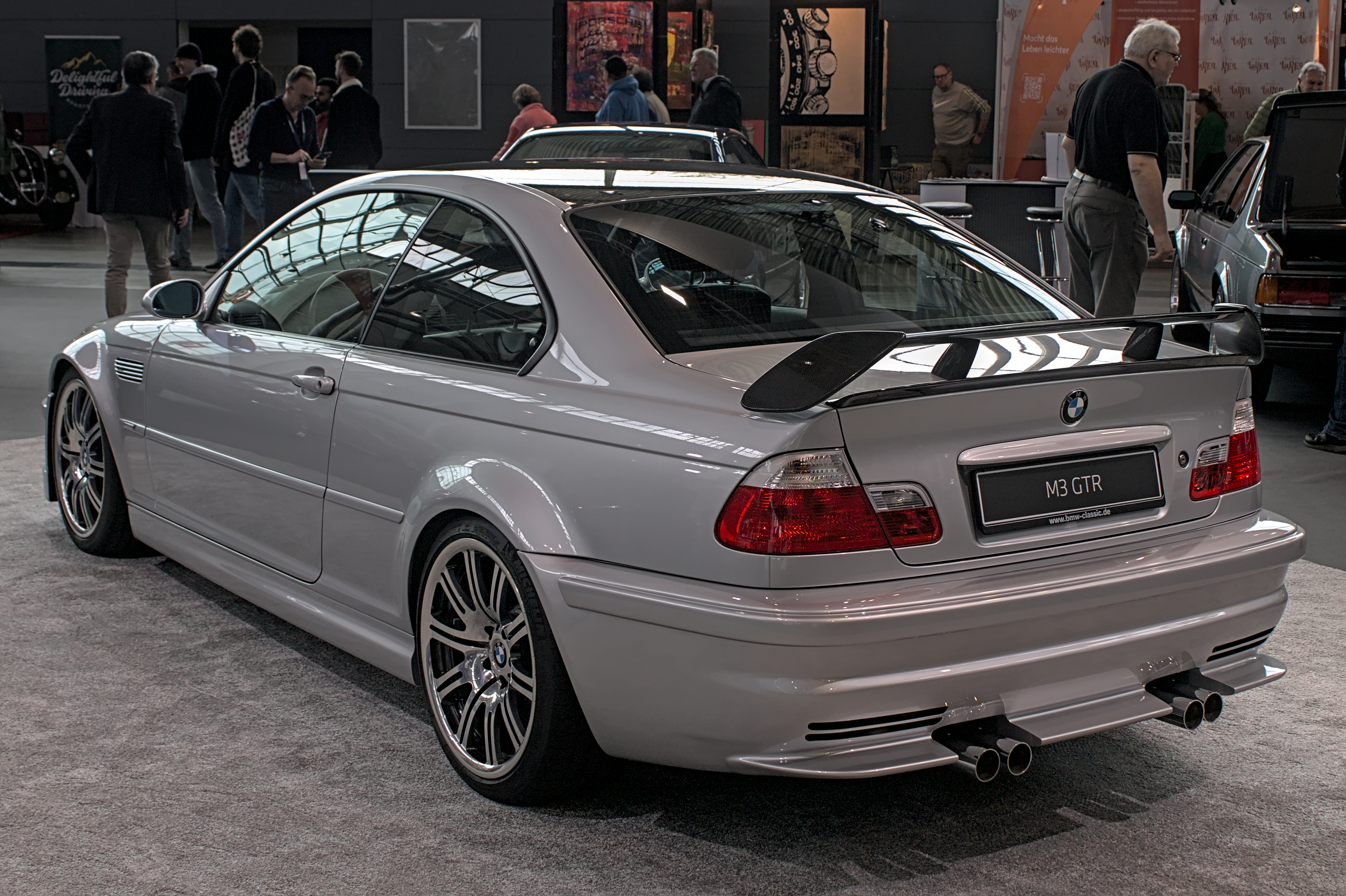
M3 GTR Straßenversion

In order to homologate the M3 GTR for racing, a road version was developed during calendar year 2001 and shown for the first time at the season ending ALMS Petit Le Mans race. BMW produced 10 development units of which 3 were production ready display cars. For homologation purposes, the M3 GTR needed to be offered for sale to the general public and by Petit Le Mans 2001, the car was ready. The M3 GTR was to be priced at €250,000, When ALMS changed the homologation rules at the end of the 2001 season, the road version project was stopped. All 7 development prototypes were recycled but the three production ready display cars exist to this day and all still owned by BMW AG. One of the Road M3 GTRs was displayed by BMW of North America LLC at Legends of the Autobahn in 2015 along with the newly restored ALMS race version of the car. The road cars were built alongside bodies-in-white of the GTR race cars in the special vehicles department of BMW's Regensburg Plant.

As with the race car, the GTR road car was powered by the 4.0-litre P60 V8 engine. The engine retained the race cars' dry sump oil system and was slightly detuned from 331 to 285 kW (444 to 382 hp) at 7,000 rpm. Top speed was 295 km/h (183 mph). The transmission was a six-speed manual and the differential was the same variable locking unit as used in the race car.

The dry weight was 1,350 kg (2,980 lb). Weight reduction measures included a carbon fibre front bumper, rear bumper and rear wing.

The M3 GTR gained a cult following in the gaming community after it appeared in the 2005 video game Need for Speed: Most Wanted. Road & Track, who collaborated on the first Need for Speed video game, described the game's custom M3 GTR as being "so iconic that fans still recreate the livery in real life." Once searched about the M3 GTR, nearly 85% of the results will relate the car to Need for Speed: Most Wanted. It also makes an appearance in Real Racing 3, with a special livery of the Need for Speed games and its own exclusive series as well.

In November 2024, BMW vinyl-wrapped the 2001 ALMS GT-winning #42 M3 GTR driven by Jörg Müller with the livery from Need for Speed: Most Wanted as a museum piece, and it was available for show in the BMW Welt Show at Munich from December 2024-January 2025.

=== North American models ===
The North American models used the same S54 engine as in other countries (unlike the previous generation, which used lower performance engines in the United States). Due to minor differences in specification, the United States models were rated at 248 kW (333 hp) and 355 N⋅m (262 lb⋅ft), resulting in an official 0–60 mph (97 km/h) acceleration time of 4.8 seconds for the coupé version (with either the manual and SMG transmission). As in other countries, top speed was electronically limited to 250 km/h (155 mph).

The CSL model was not sold in the North American market.

=== Motorsport ===
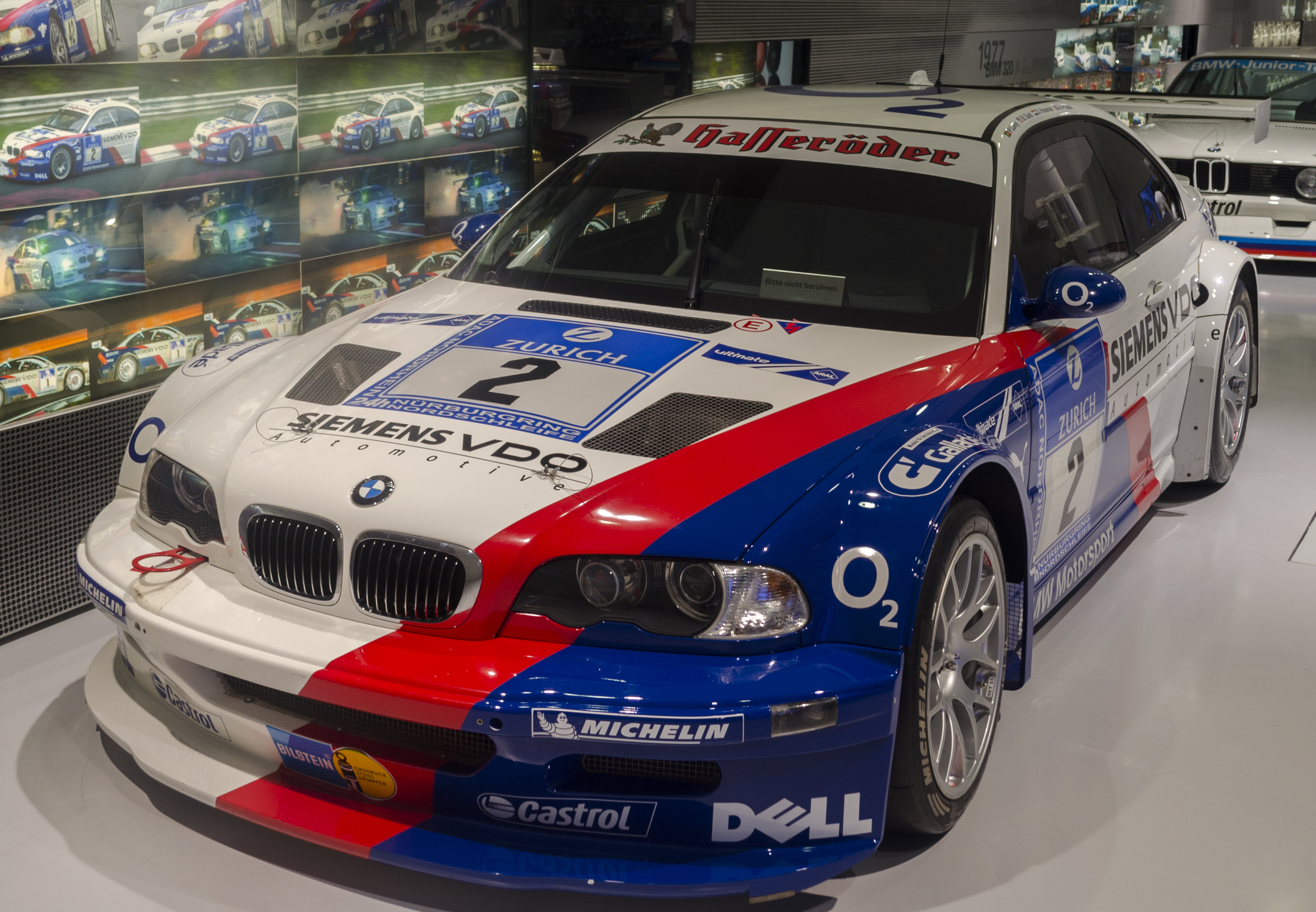
M3 GTR racing version

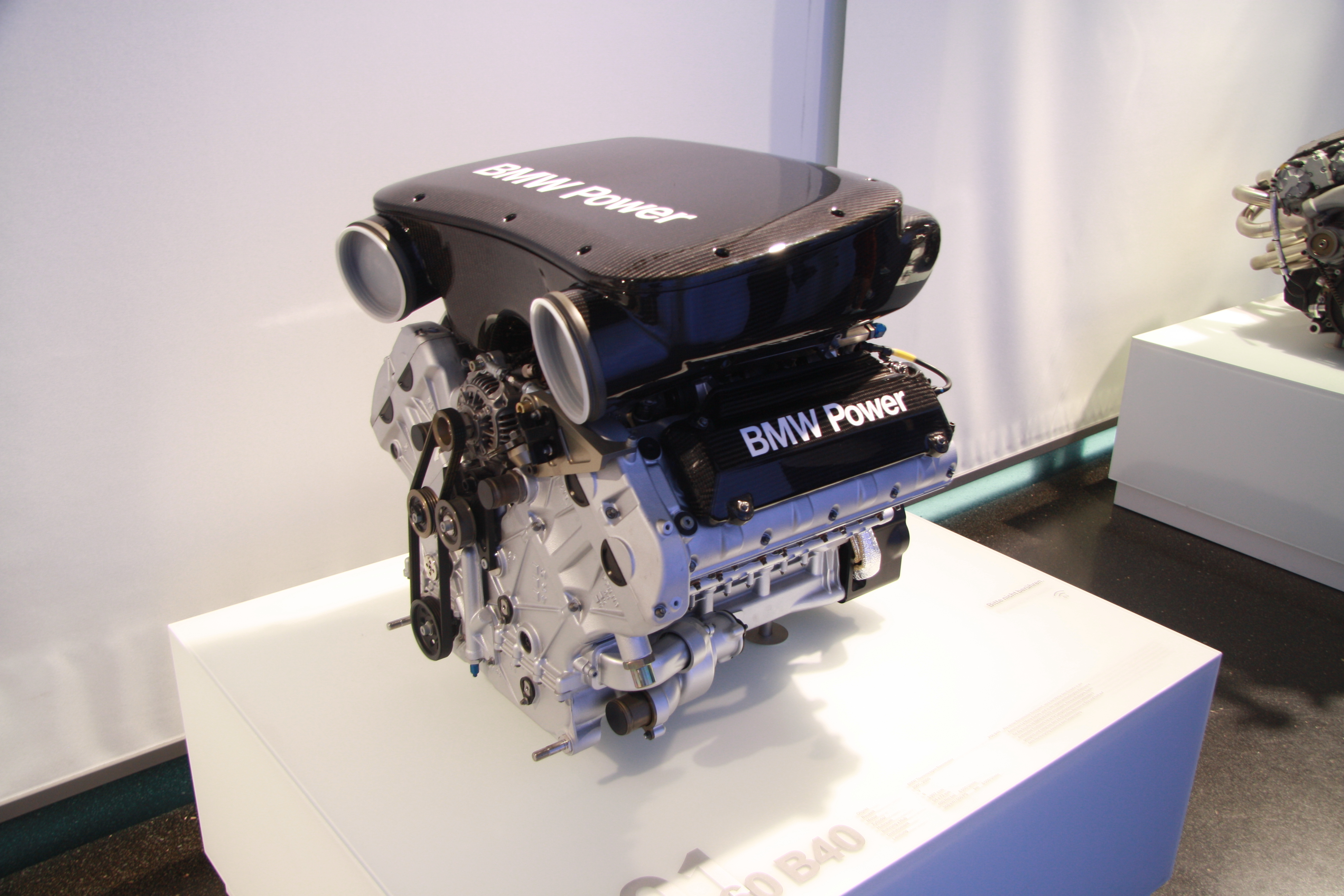
BMW P60B40 V8 engine used in the GTR

In the United States, the E46 M3 competed in the 2000 American Le Mans Series GT category and finished third in the championship. The straight-six engine was viewed as uncompetitive compared to the Porsche 996 GT3, therefore BMW began to develop a new M3 racing car based around a more powerful engine. The resulting E46 GTR racing car was introduced in February 2001 and was powered by a 330 kW (443 hp) version of the 3,997 cc (4.0 L) P60 V8 engine. With a more powerful engine than the straight-six powered M3 versions (which were outpaced by the competition), the GTR won the 2001 American Le Mans Series GT category, driven by Jörg Müller.

The eligibility of the GTR was the subject of controversy, with some rival teams believing that the GTR was an in-house prototype vehicle rather than a production model available for purchase by the general public. The ALMS homologation rules for 2001 required the M3 GTR road car to be sold on at least two continents within twelve months of the rules being issued, which BMW claimed to fulfill by stating that 10 GTR road cars were available for sale. The ALMS rules were altered for 2002, now requiring that 100 cars and 1,000 engines must be built for a car to qualify without penalties. The GTR road car was never intended for production on this scale, so BMW withdrew the GTR from competition at this point.

In 2003, the M3 GTR returned to competition at the 24 Hours Nürburgring, with two cars run by Schnitzer Motorsport. The GTR won the 24 Hours Nürburgring in 2004 and 2005, and competed in the 24 Hours Spa.

Also in 2003, an M3 GTR raced in the 2003 Bathurst 24 Hour race in the hands of Australian race team Prancing Horse Racing. Although the car only arrived in Australia just a week before the race, John Bowe managed to still qualify the car (which ran a fairly stock 5.0L version of the BMW P60B40 V8 engine) in 3rd place. The race, with drivers Bowe, Neil Crompton, Greg Crick and team owner, Indonesian millionaire businessman Maher Algadrie, would only last 131 laps however (the winner covered 527 laps) before Algadrie was put out in an accidental clash on top of The Mountain at around 11 PM while being lapped by the Holden Monaro 427C of eventual race winner Peter Brock.

== E90/E92/E93 generation (2007–2013) ==
E90/92/93 M3
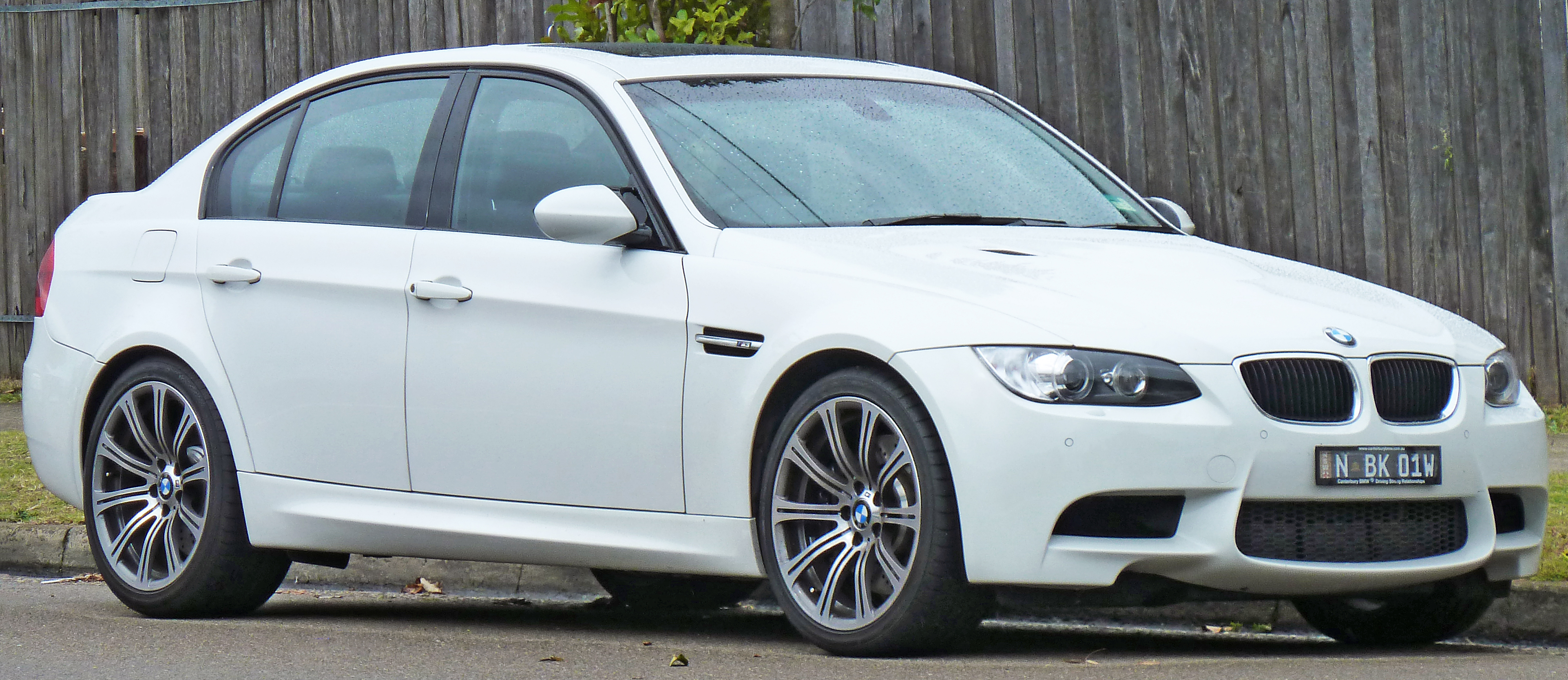

Overview
- Production: September 2007 – July 2013
- Designer: Stephan Baum (E90); Karl Elmitt, Hans-Bruno Starke (E92)

Body and chassis
- Body style: 4-door saloon (E90); 2-door coupé (E92); 2-door convertible (E93)
- Layout: Front-engine, rear-wheel-drive
- Related: BMW 3 Series (E90/E92/E93)

Powertrain
- Engine: 4.0 L S65B40 V8; 4.4 L S65B44 V8
- Transmission: 6-speed ZF GS6-53BZ Manual; 7-speed Getrag 7DCI600 DCT

Dimensions
- Wheelbase: 2,761 mm (108.7 in)
- Length: 4,582–4,618 mm (180.4–181.8 in)
- Width: 1,803–1,821 mm (71.0–71.7 in)
- Height: 1,377–1,448 mm (54.2–57.0 in)
- Curb weight: 1,580–1,810 kg (3,483–3,990 lb)

Chronology
- Successor: BMW M4 (F82/F83, for coupe and convertible models)

The M3 model of the E90/E92/E93 3 Series range was powered by the BMW S65 V8 engine and was produced in saloon, convertible and coupé body styles. The E9x is the first and only standard production M3 powered by a V8 engine as its successor would revert to using a straight 6 engine. In the standard M3, the S65 engine rated at 309 kW (420 PS; 414 hp) at 8,400 rpm and 400 N⋅m (295 lb⋅ft) at 3,900 rpm.

Initially, the M3 was produced with a 6-speed manual transmission. In April 2008, the E90/E92/E93 M3 became the first BMW to be available with a dual-clutch transmission when the 7-speed Getrag "M-DCT" transmission was introduced as an option.

The official 0–100 km/h (62 mph) acceleration times for the coupé and saloon are 4.6 seconds with the DCT transmission (4.8 seconds with the manual transmission) and 5.1 seconds for the convertible.

The E90 and E92 versions received many positive reviews, including "the greatest all-around car in the world", "the finest car on the market, period" and "the best, most complete car in the world".

=== Development and production ===
Total production of the E9x M3 was 40,092 coupés, 16,219 convertibles and 9,674 saloon. Production of saloon models finished in 2011, with coupés remaining in production until July 5, 2013.

=== Body styles ===
The first body style to be introduced was the E92 coupé, which was previewed at the 2007 Geneva Motor Show and introduced in production form at the 2007 Frankfurt Motor Show on 12 September. The coupé version uses a carbon fibre roof to reduce weight and lower the centre of gravity. In 2010, the coupé and convertible versions received a minor facelift, which included revised LED tail-lights and minor interior trim pieces but it did not get the updated headlights from the regular series.

The E93 convertible version was introduced shortly after the coupé and uses a power retractable hardtop. The leather seats in the convertible version are treated with a coating to reflect sunlight, in order to reduce their tendency to become uncomfortably hot with the top down.

The E90 saloon version was introduced in 2008 and was the second (along with the E36) M3 by generation to be produced in a 4-door body style. The saloon has the same drivetrain and similar external styling as the coupé, however the lack of a carbon fibre roof contributes to a weight increase of 10 kg (22 lb) compared to an identically equipped coupé.

The official kerb weights for the 2008 European-specification models (with manual transmission) are 1,580 kg (3,483 lb) for the coupé, 1,605 kg (3,538 lb) for the saloon and 1,810 kg (3,990 lb) for the convertible.

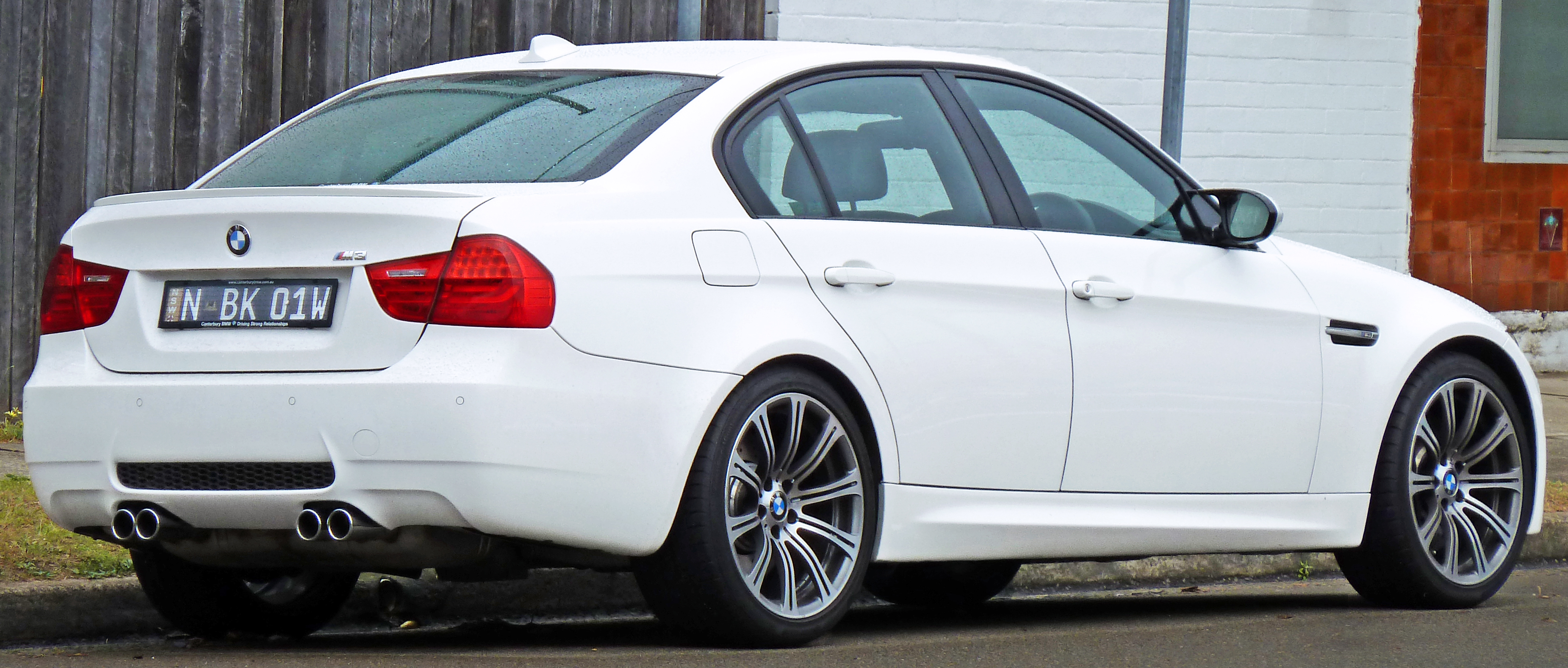
Saloon (E90)

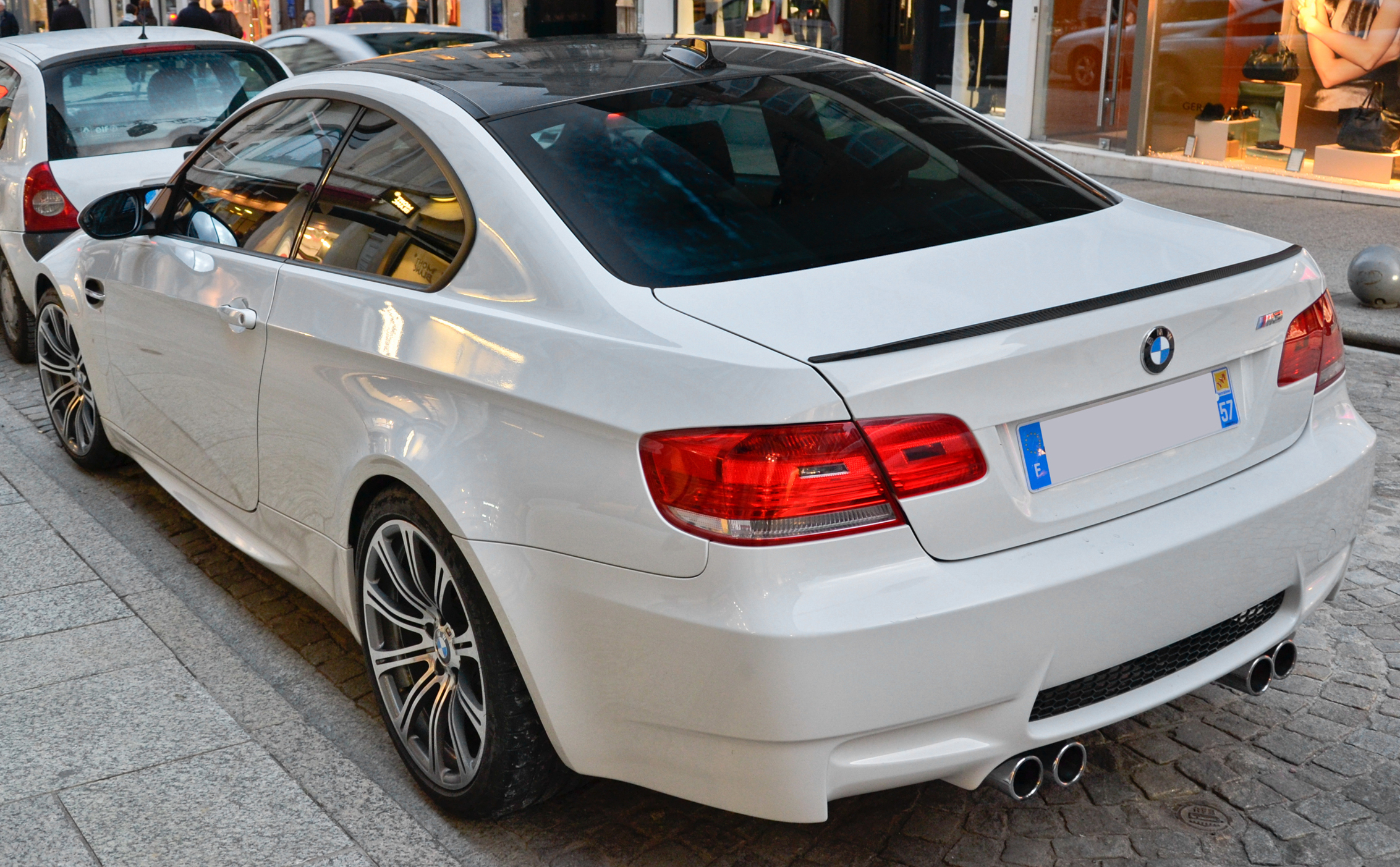
Coupé (E92)

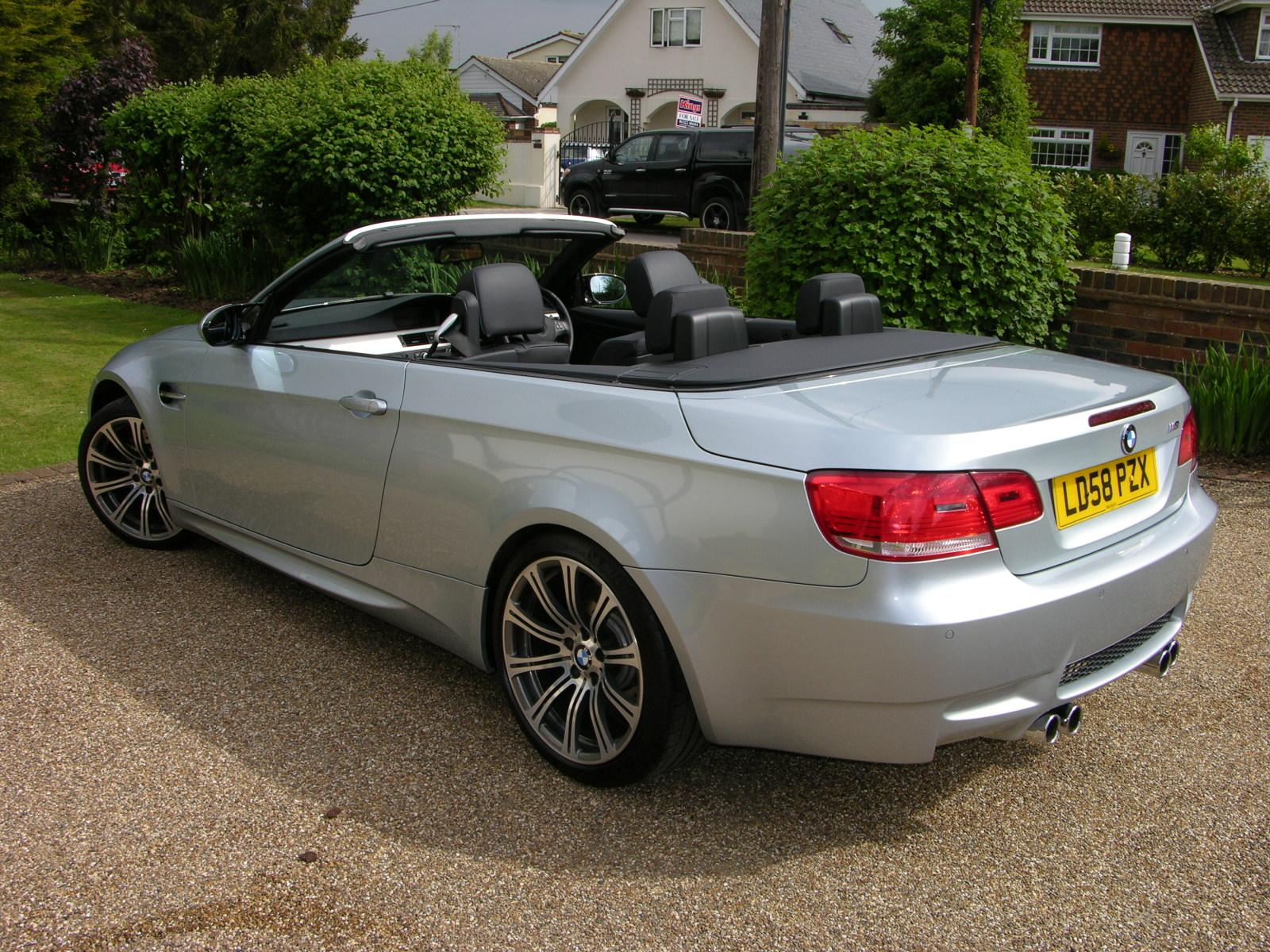
Convertible (E93)

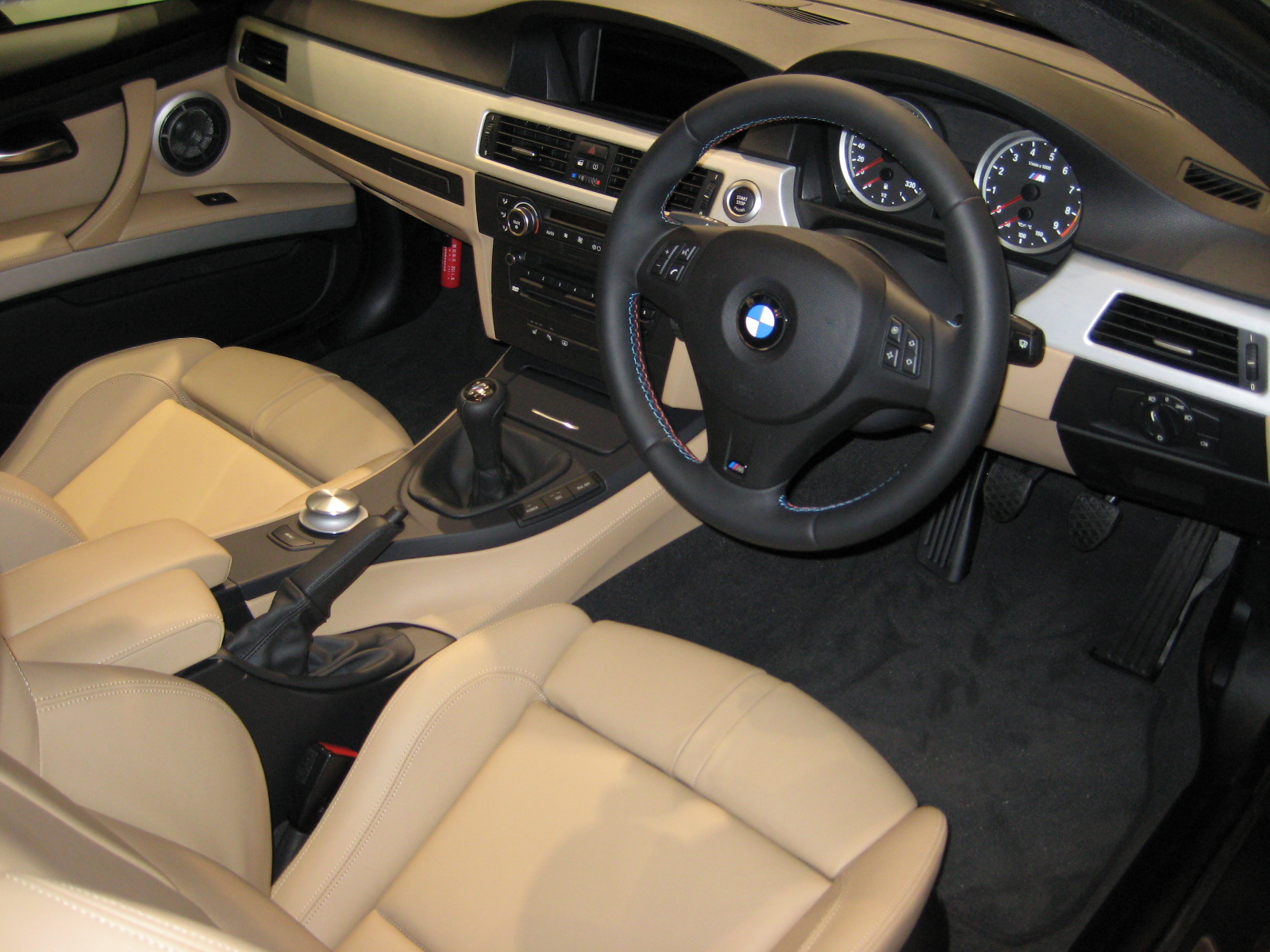
E92 M3 interior

=== M Performance Parts ===
M Performance Parts were made for the sixth generation M3. These include black kidney grilles, M wheels, an M Performance exhaust that reduces the weight by 9 kg (20 lb), carbon fibre mirrors, spoilers and splitter, a handbrake, steel pedals, a sport steering wheel, black side trim and alcantara leather steering wheel button trim, M stripes decal.

=== Special editions ===
==== Competition Package (ZCP) ====
The "Competition Package" (sometimes known as ZCP) version was released in 2010. The changes related to the suspension and electronic stability control and consisted of:

- Ride height lowered by 10 mm (0.4 in)
- Revised tuning of the adjustable dampers (Electronic Damping Control)
- An "M" mode for the electronic stability control
- 19-inch wheels (Styling 359)

==== GTS ====
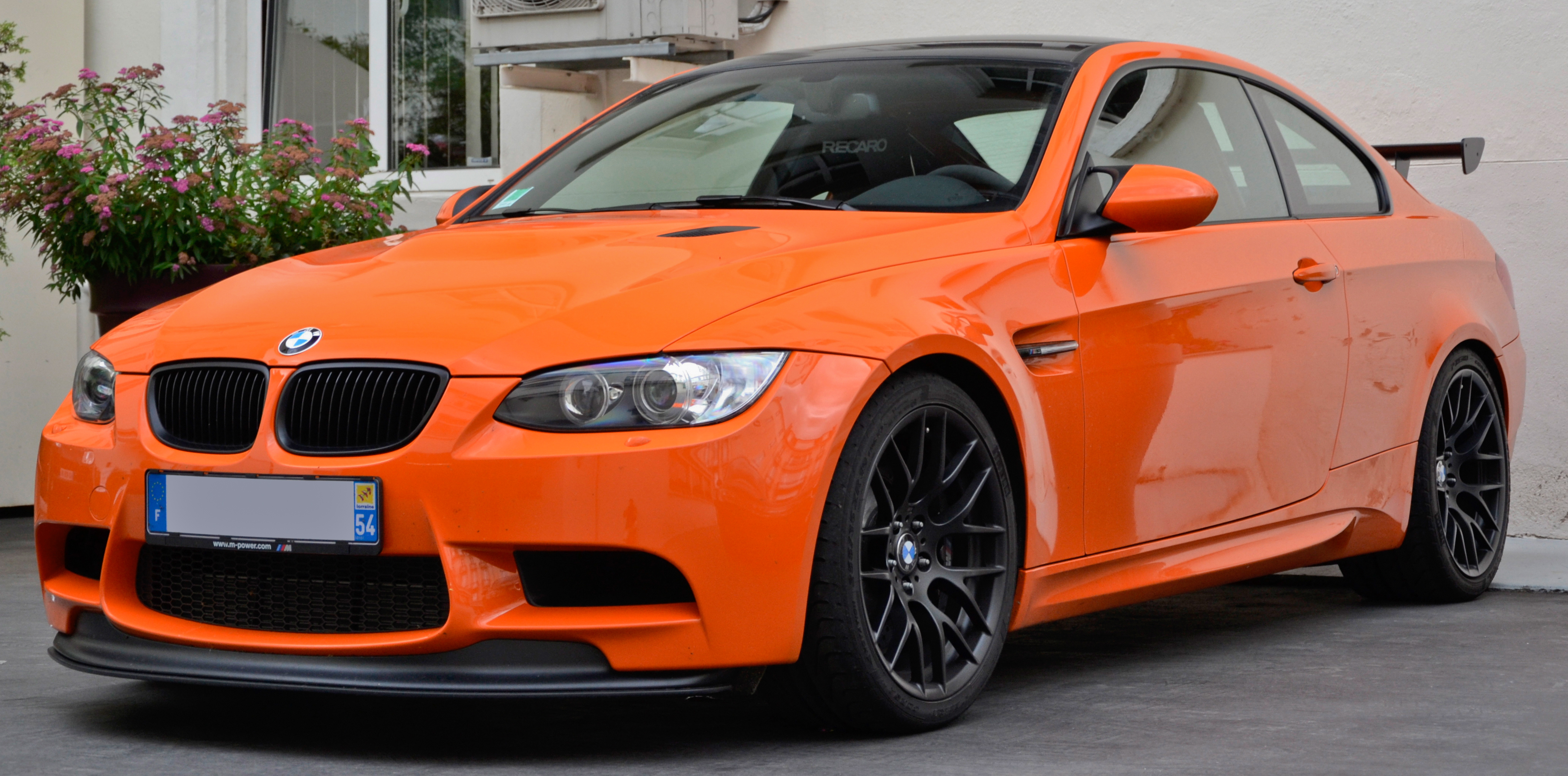
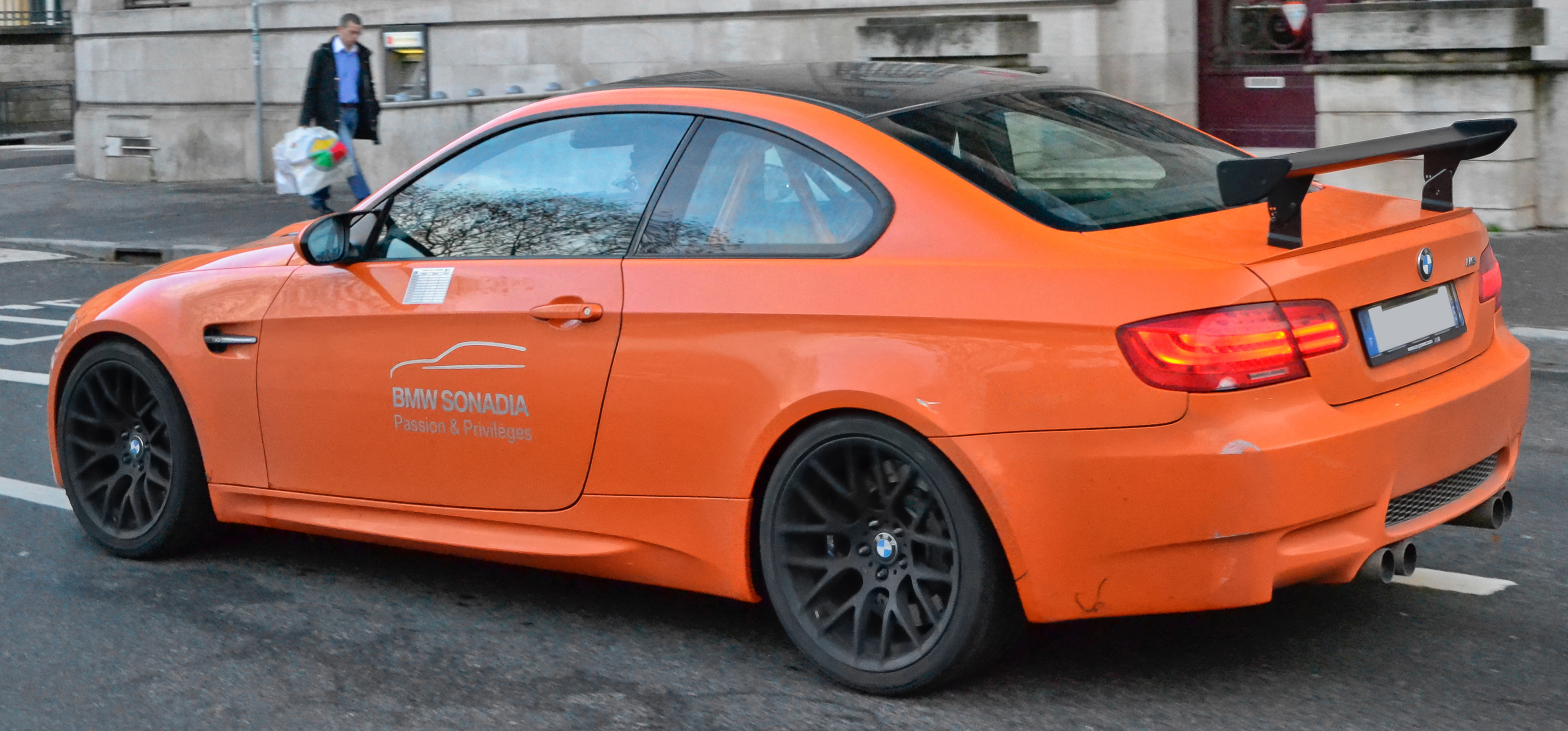
M3 GTS

BMW announced the M3 GTS in November 2009 and began production in 2010. The GTS was designed as a "road-legal clubsport-oriented model" and produced only in the coupé body style. Changes over the regular M3 include an upgraded engine, reduced curb weight, revised suspension, upgraded brakes and adjustable aerodynamics.

The GTS uses an engine enlarged to 4.4 L (269 cu in) which has a power output of 331 kW (444 hp). The sole transmission option was the 7-speed dual-clutch transmission (M-DCT) and the official 0–100 km/h (0–62 mph) acceleration time for the GTS is 4.4 seconds.

The car weighs 136 kg (300 lb) less than the regular M3, due to a lighter centre console and door panels, polycarbonate side and rear windows, a lack of rear seats and the removal of acoustic insulation.

Suspension changes include adjustable camber angle and ride height, a rigidly mounted rear axle and revised dampers. The front brakes were upgraded to 6-piston callipers with 18 mm (0.7 in) larger discs, and the rear brakes were upgraded to 4-piston callipers with 18 mm (0.7 in) larger discs. Aerodynamics are adjustable via the front apron and the angle of the rear wing. Production was limited to 135 cars, which sold out quickly.

==== CRT ====
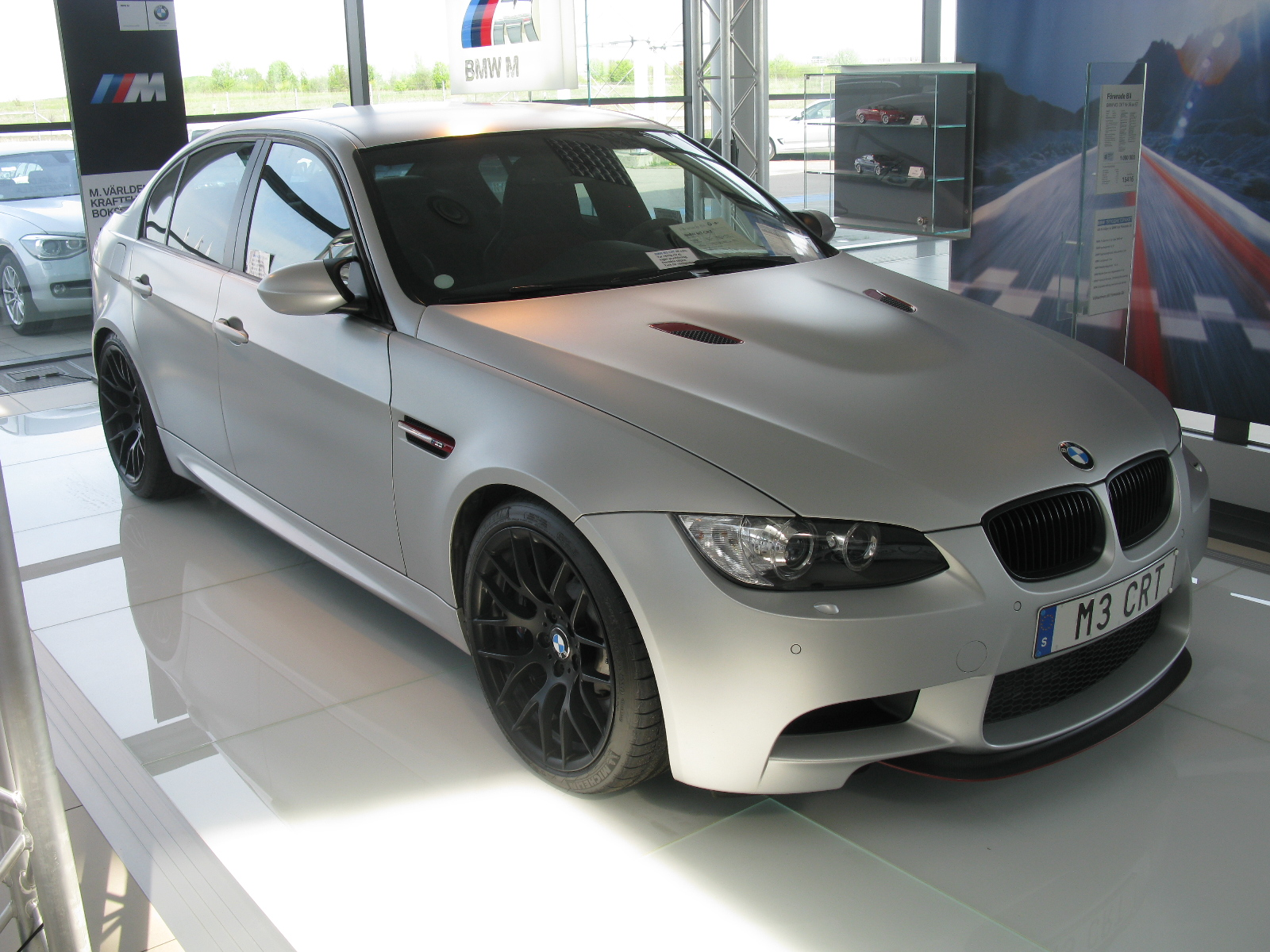
M3 CRT

The M3 CRT (Carbon Racing Technology) was a special edition of the M3 saloon that was produced in 2011. The CRT was powered by the same 4.4 litre version of the S65 engine as the GTS, however it retained a higher level of luxury features compared to the track-focused GTS. The CRT used a carbon fibre bonnet and front seats to reduce weight, resulting in a kerb weight approximately 150 lb (68 kg) lower than an equivalently specified version of the regular M3 saloon.

Production was limited to 67 cars, all numbered with a plaque on the dashboard. The official 0–100 km/h (0–62 mph) acceleration time was 4.4 seconds.

==== DTM Champion Edition ====
BMW Motorsport returned to the DTM in 2012, and 54 "DTM Champion Edition" cars were built to commemorate the BMW M3 winning the championship. The unique features of the DTM Champion Edition consisted of visual changes to associate the car with the DTM race car, such as the "Frozen Black" paint colour, stripes over the roof and bootlid, carbon flaps, a gurney flap and matte black wheels. Interior changes included carbon fibre for some interior trim items, an "M Power" logo embroidered on the handbrake grip and a numbered plaque with Spengler's signature and the text "DTM champion 2012" above the glove box. All cars were produced with the dual-clutch transmission.

==== Lime Rock Park Edition (US) ====
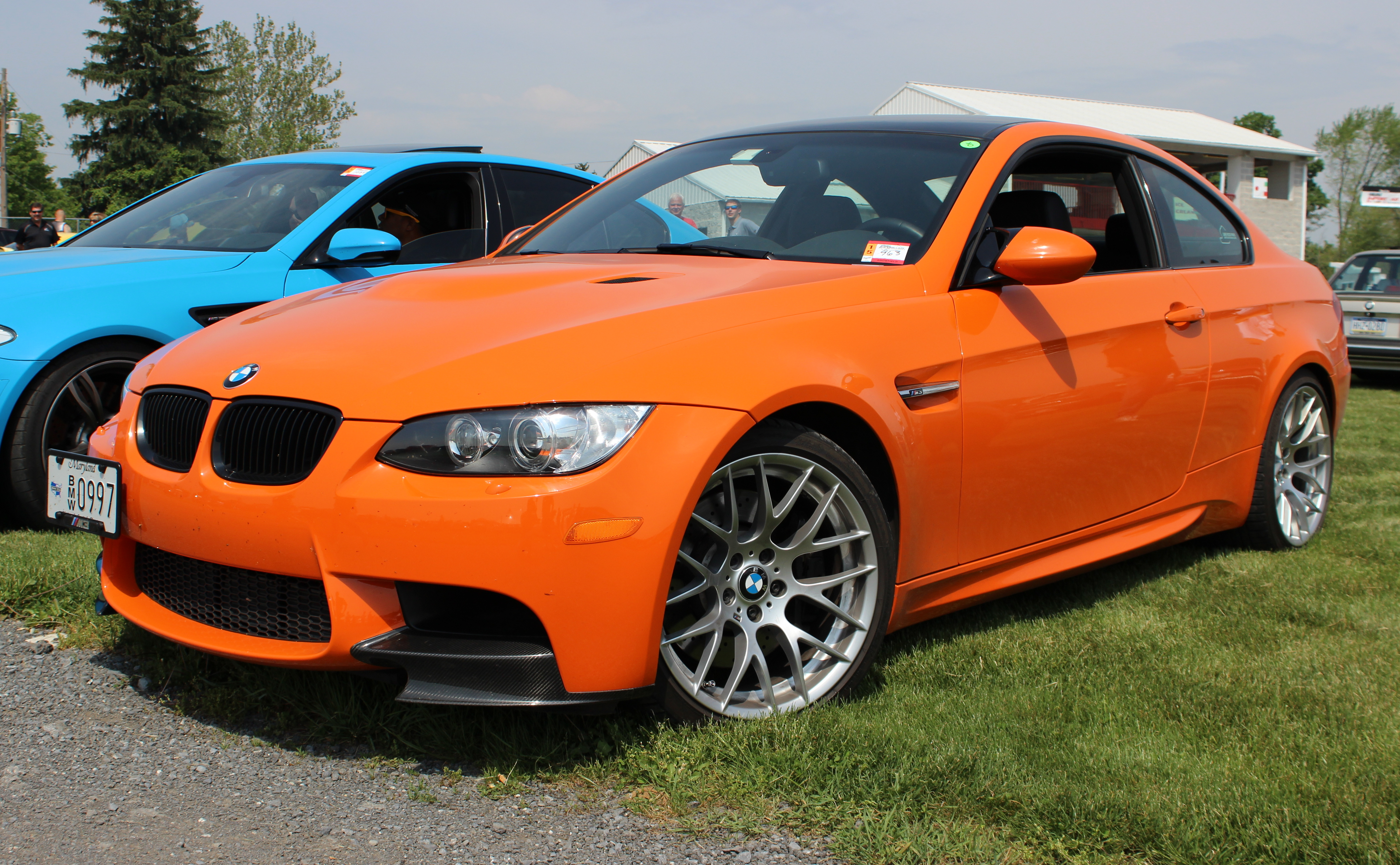
BMW M3 Lime Rock Park Edition

In the United States, the M3 Lime Rock Park Edition was produced for the 2013 model year. A total of 200 cars were sold, all coupés painted in the "Fire Orange" colour. Performance changes included a carbon fibre front splitter and rear spoiler, a ride height lowered by 0.4 in (10 mm), higher thresholds for the electronic stability control and a lightweight exhaust system. BMW claims the same engine power output as the regular M3, however, when marketing the lightweight Inconel-titanium BMW Motorsports Exhaust to stock M3 vehicles, BMW claims that the system adds about 5 hp (4 kW).

The interior of the Lime Rock Park Edition includes a plaque reading "One of 200".

==== Frozen Edition ====
Due to the GTS version not being available in South Africa, BMW developed the BMW M3 Frozen Edition in 2009. The engine was upgraded to generate 330 kW (443 hp), due to an AC Schnitzer intake manifold and changes to the engine management system.

Twenty-five Frozen Edition cars were produced, all with exterior colours of either "Frozen Black" or "Frozen Grey".

==== Competition Edition Frozen Silver ====
In 2012, BMW announced this edition with 40 to be built for US and 100 for Europe.

Built to commemorate the 40th anniversary of BMW's M Division, each model came with "Frozen Silver Metallic" exterior paint. According to BMW, the colour is a special matte paint that adds a metallic lustre to the vehicle. The interior has black leather and palladium silver accessories.

=== M3 Pickup Prototype ===
The M3 Pickup is a one-off custom variant of the M3 which was based on the E93 M3 convertible and publicly announced on April Fool's Day in 2011. It was used as a workshop transport vehicle for BMW M GmbH, replacing their E30 M3 pickup version after 26 years of use. The vehicle was assembled by M GmbH's employees, as well as interns and engineering students.

=== Motorsport ===
The E92 M3 saw BMW return to the Deutsche Tourenwagen Masters (DTM) after a break of 20 years. In its debut season in 2012, the M3 won the drivers championship, the manufacturers championship and five out of ten races for the season.

In endurance racing, the BMW Motorsport/Schnitzer Motorsport M3 GT2 won the 2010 24 Hours of Nürburgring, driven by Jörg Müller, Augusto Farfus, Pedro Lamy, and Uwe Alzen. The M3 also qualified second at the 2010 24 Hours of Spa and led the race until being forced to retire in the final hour due to suspension failure. The M3 won the GT2 category in the ILMC 2010 1000 km of Zhuhai in China.

A GT4 version of the M3 was introduced in 2009 and competed in various races, including finishing third in the GT4 SP10 class at the 2009 24 Hours Nürburgring, and winning its class at the ADAC Westfalenfahrt race at the Nürburgring in April 2009. In July 2009, BMW Motorsport released an M3 GT4 model for sale to private teams and drivers; this included the GT2 body kit. The official kerb weight was 1,430 kg (3,153 lb) and changes to the 336 kW (451 bhp) were claimed to be minimal. For the 2010 24 Hours Nürburgring, the "Balance of Performance" required the M3 to not exceed a power output of 287 kW (385 bhp) and to have a minimum weight of 1,400 kg (3,086 lb).

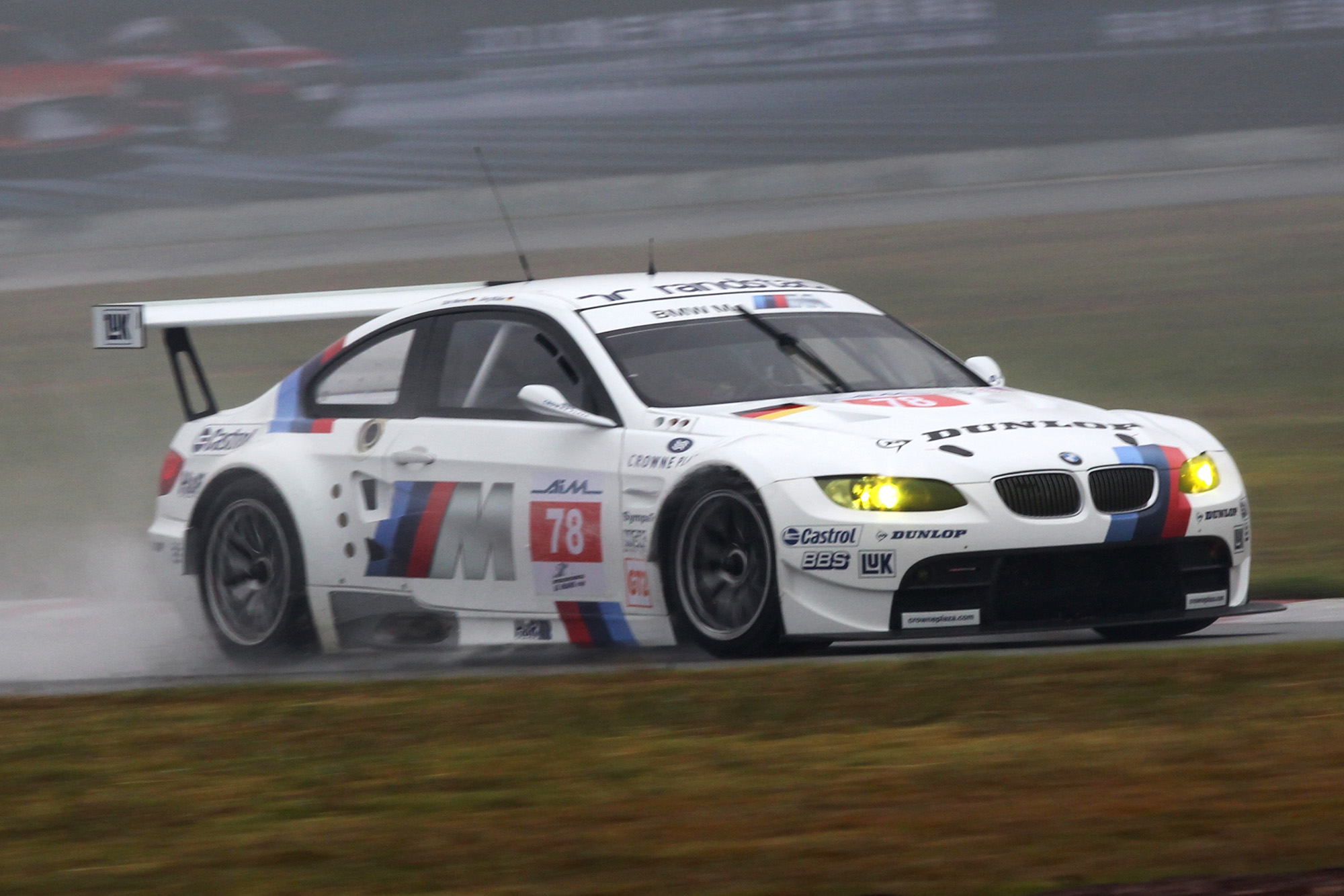
Schnitzer Motorsport M3 GT2

In the United States, Rahal Letterman Racing entered two factory-backed E92 M3s in the 2009 American Le Mans Series season, competing in the GT2 category. In 2011, the BMW achieved a 1–2 finish in the 12 Hours of Sebring. In the 2011 American Le Mans Series GT class, BMW Team RLL swept all categories, winning the GT manufacturer, team and driver championships. In 2012, the M3 won the GT class at the 12 Hours of Sebring. The #79 M3 GT2 that competed at Le Mans became the 17th BMW Art Car after it was decorated by Jeff Koons. The M3 GT2 was succeeded by the BMW Z4 GTE in 2013.

== F80 generation (2014–2018) ==
F80 M3
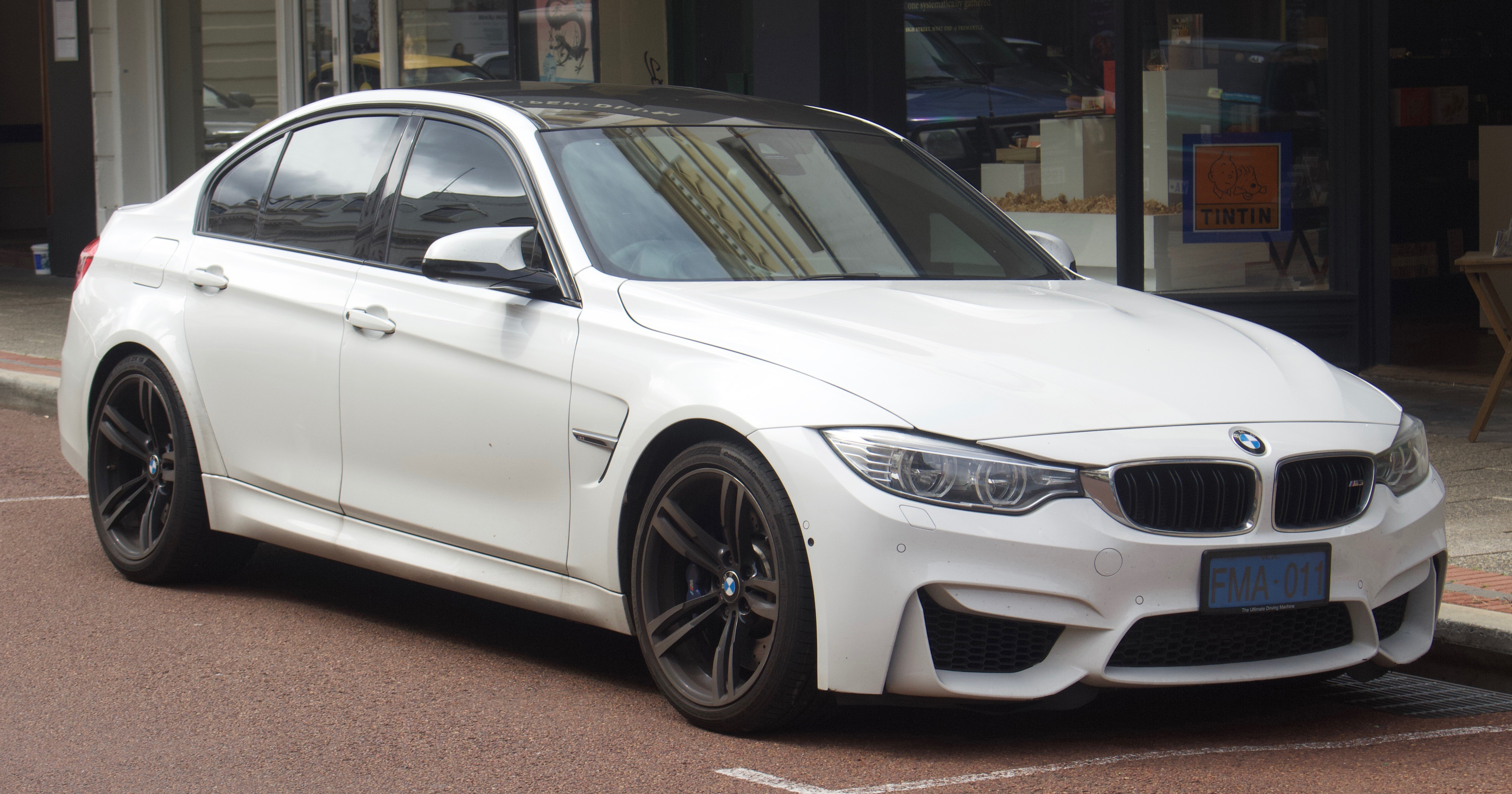

Overview
- Production: 2014 – October 2018
- Designer: Florian Nissl

Body and chassis
- Body style: 4-door saloon
- Layout: Front-engine, rear-wheel-drive
- Related: BMW 3 Series (F30); BMW M4 (F82/F83)

Powertrain
- Engine: 3.0 L S55B30T0 twin-turbo I6
- Transmission: 6-speed manual; 7-speed Getrag 7DCI600 DCT

Dimensions
- Wheelbase: 2,812 mm (110.7 in)
- Length: 4,671 mm (183.9 in)
- Width: 1,877 mm (73.9 in)
- Height: 1,424 mm (56.1 in)
- Curb weight: 1,614 kg (3,559 lb)

The M3 version of the F30 3 Series was designated the F80 and was produced from 2014 to 2018. The F80 M3 was powered by the BMW S55 twin-turbocharged straight-six engine, therefore being the first turbocharged M3 model. Despite the smaller displacement than the V8 engine used by the previous generation of M3, the switch from naturally aspirated engines to turbocharging resulted in peak power being increased from 309 to 317 kW (420 to 431 PS; 414 to 425 hp), and peak torque being increased from 400 to 550 N⋅m (295 to 406 lb⋅ft).

The official 0–60 mph (0–97 km/h) acceleration times are 3.9 seconds with the M-DCT transmission and 4.1 seconds with the manual transmission. Top speed is limited to 250 km/h (155 mph) but an optional M Driver's package raises this to 280 km/h (174 mph). The kerb weight is 1,621 kg (3,574 lb).

The F80 M3 was unveiled, alongside the F82 M4 (its coupé counterpart), at the 2014 North American International Auto Show. The two-door M3 had been renamed BMW M4 – in line with the new BMW 4 Series range.

2016, a Competition Package became available for the M3 and M4. Changes included an increase in power to 331 kW (450 PS; 444 hp), revised tuning of the electronic differential and the electronic stability control ("DSC"), suspension upgrades and new front seats. The official 0–100 km/h (62 mph) time was 4.0 seconds with the dual-clutch transmission.

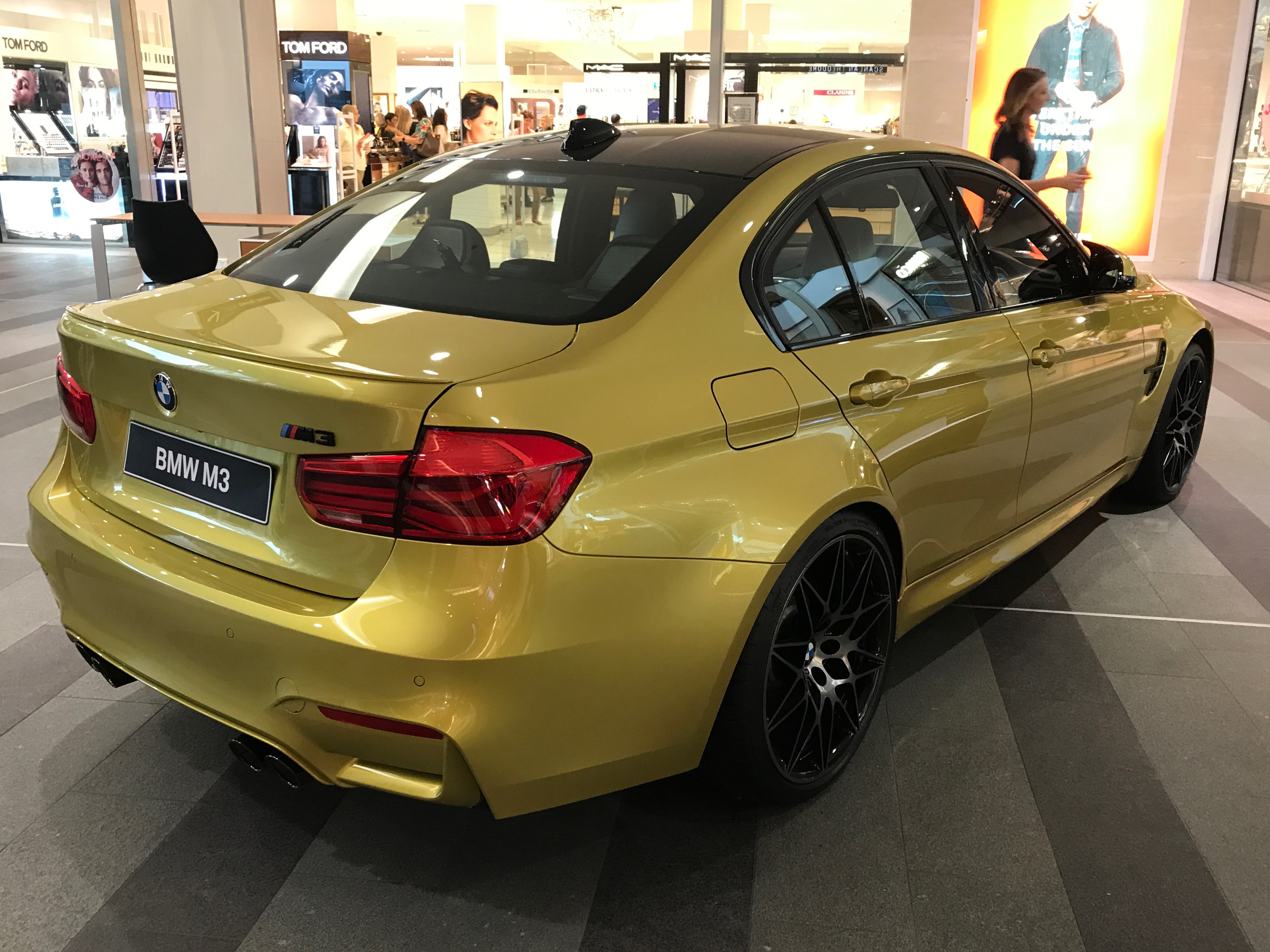
F80 M3 - rear view

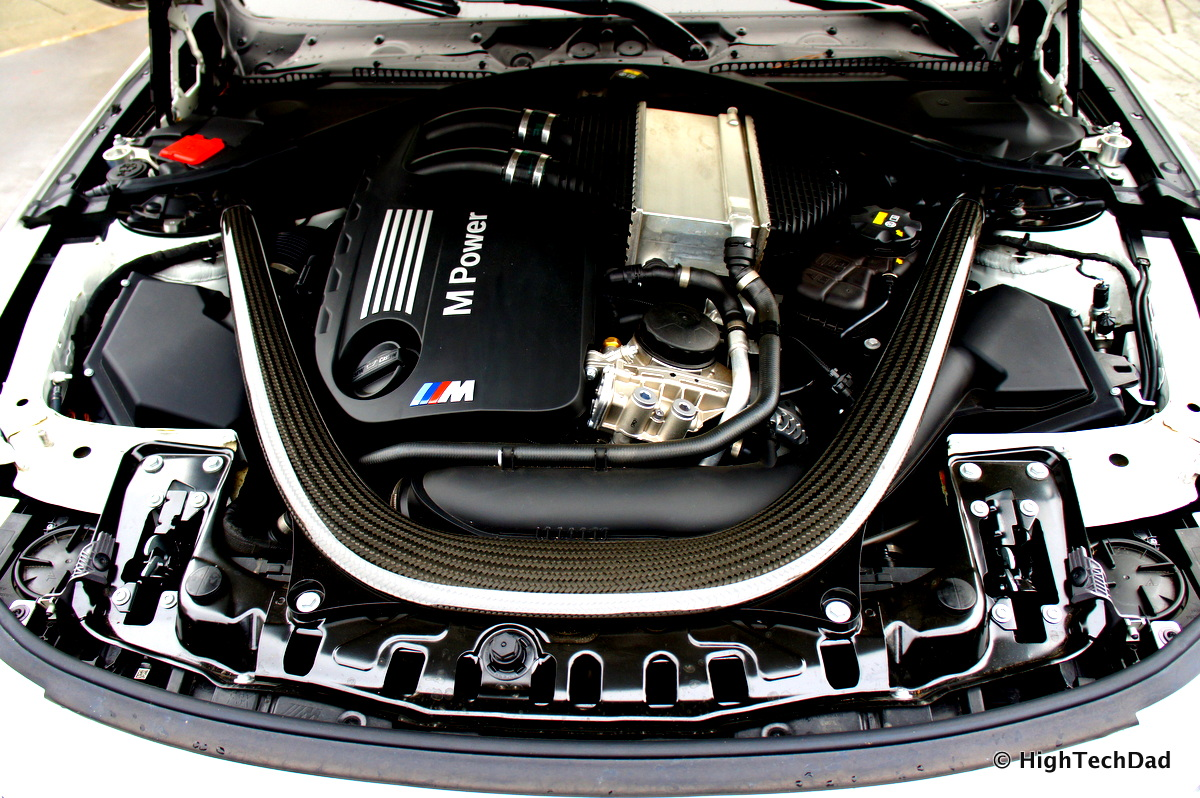
BMW S55 straight-six engine

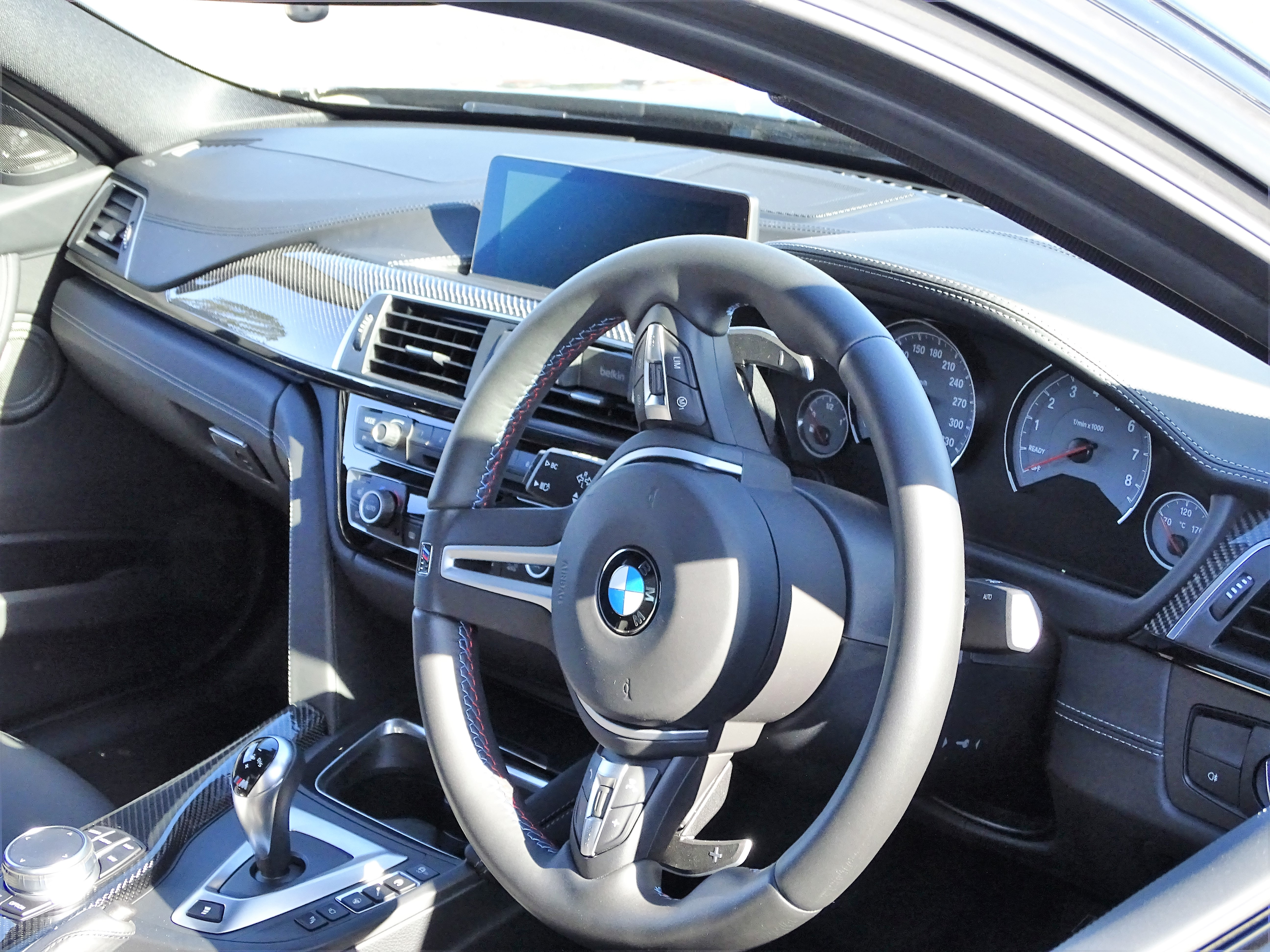
Interior

=== Body styles ===
The F80 generation of M3 was produced only as a saloon, following the company's plans to split off the 4 Series coupé and convertible from the 3 Series. To minimise weight, the roof is made of carbon fibre and the bonnet and front quarter panels are made from aluminium.

=== Facelifts ===
The F80 M3's design was updated in (summer) 2015 for the 2016 model year and in (march) 2017 for the 2018 model year. In the former, the taillights were given LEDs, and in the latter, the headlights were restyled and also given newer and more angular LEDs.

=== M Performance Parts ===
M Performance Parts can be fitted to all M3 models. These include a carbon fibre diffuser, a carbon fibre spoiler, a carbon fibre bumper winglet, a splitter and side skirts.

=== Special editions ===
==== M3 Pure ====
The Australian-only M3 Pure model was sold as the base model, being cheaper than the regular M3. The M3 Pure has the engine, exhaust and suspension from the Competition Package. Exterior trims include black badges, front grilles, side grilles and exhaust tips, while the interior trim uses a combination of leather and cloth.

==== M3 CS ====
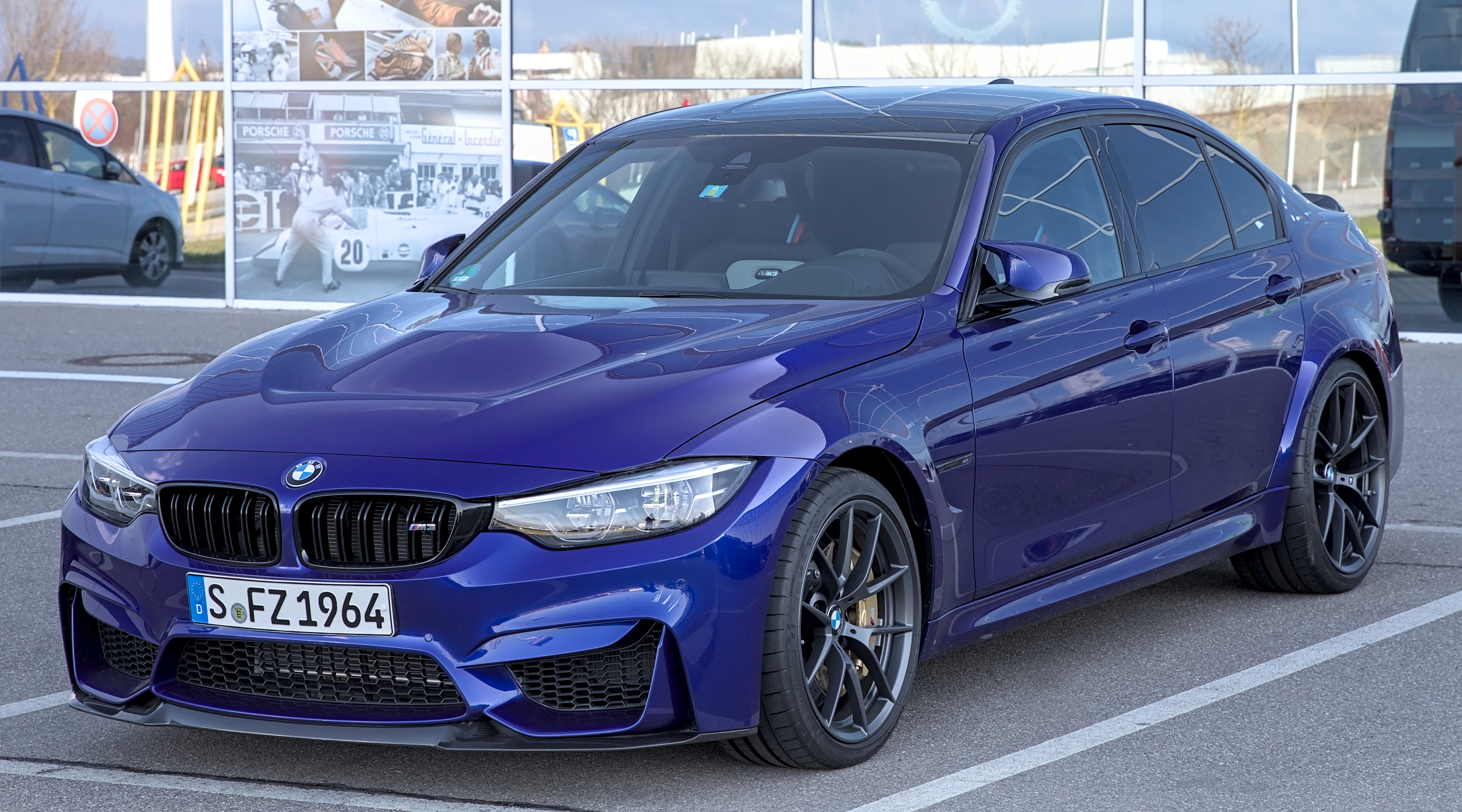
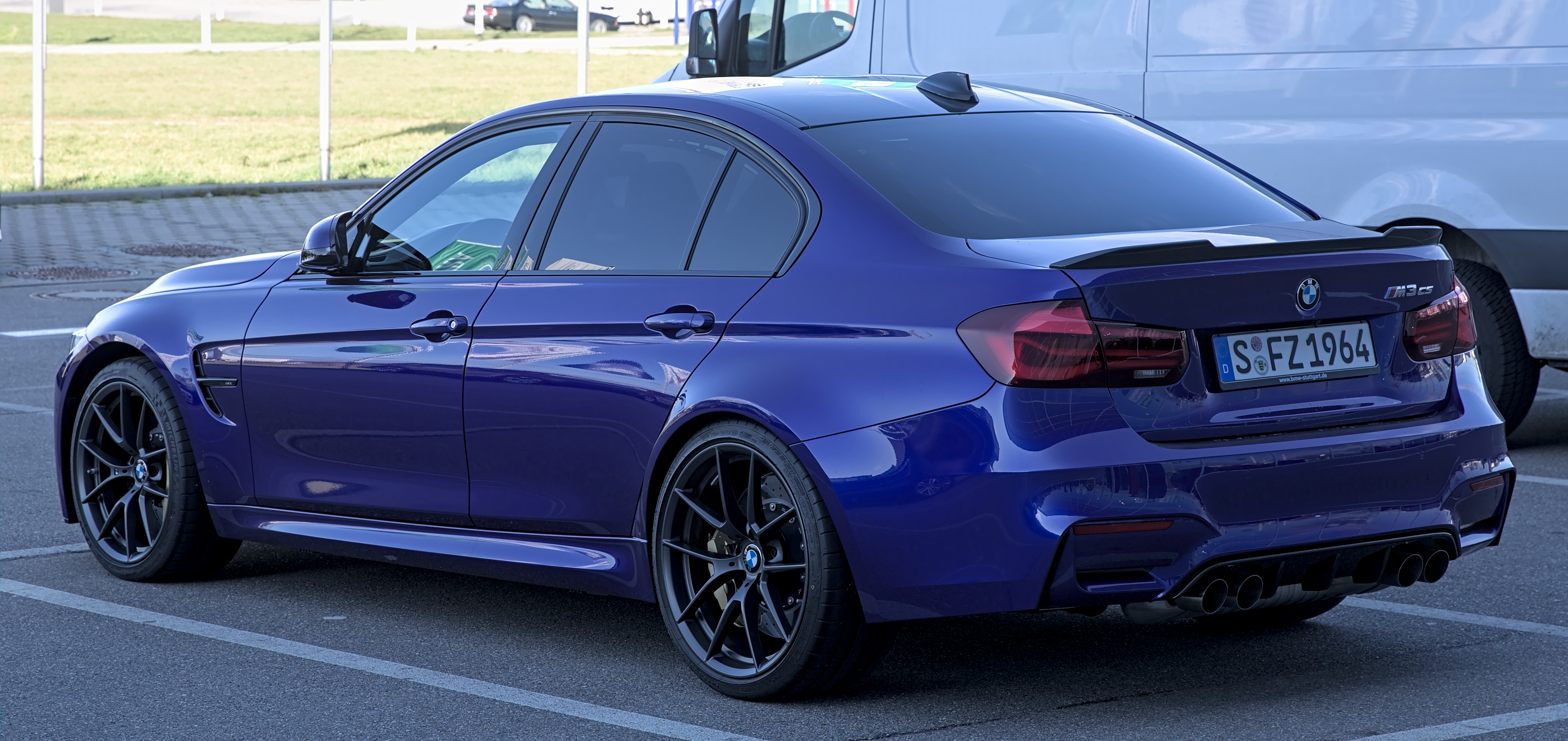
M3 CS

An "M3 CS" special edition was produced in 2018 with an upgraded engine rated at 338 kW (453 hp) and 601 N⋅m (443 lb⋅ft). The weight was reduced by 50 kg (110 lb) through use of a carbon fibre hood and front splitter, Alcantara interior parts and thinner glass for the side windows.

Production of the CS totalled 1,200 units.

==== M3 30-Jahre Edition ====
To celebrate the 30th anniversary of the introduction of the first M3, BMW produced a limited run of 30-Jahre edition cars. Only 500 were made and distributed worldwide, with 150 of these making their way to the US. The US cars were all equipped with Individual Macao Blue paint, Fjord Blue and Black interior, Competition package and numerous badges and trim denoting the cars as 30-Jahre Edition.

==== M3 Velocity Edition ====
In 2018, BMW produced 20 M3 Velocity Edition models that were only available for purchase to military members stationed in Stuttgart, Germany. The Velocity Edition is equipped with the Competition Package and is only available in the "Fashion Grey Metallic" colour. A laser engraved dash/engine strut denotes the number of 20 cars made.

=== Motorsport ===
With the M3 model now being solely as a saloon, the motor racing activities switched to the M4 (F82) coupé.

=== Discontinuation ===
Production ceased in October 2018, due to the extensive changes required to meet the WLTP emissions regulations. However, the M4 model remained in production.

== G80/G81 generation (2020–present) ==
G80 M3
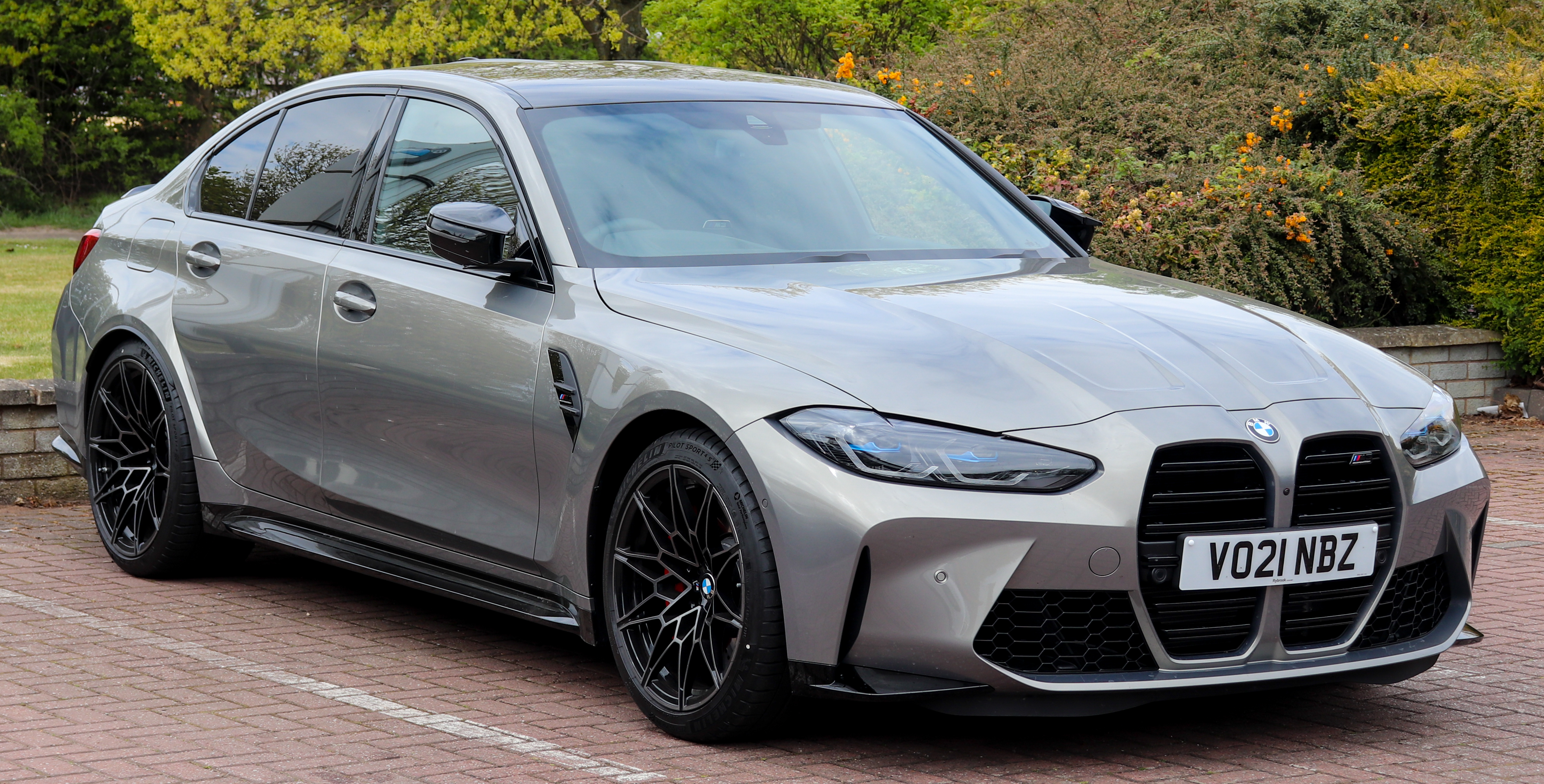

Overview
- Production: 2020–present
- Designer: Anne Forschner

Body and chassis
- Body style: 4-door saloon (G80); 5-door estate (G81)
- Layout: Front-engine, rear-wheel-drive; Front-engine, all-wheel-drive
- Platform: BMW CLAR platform
- Related: BMW 3 Series (G20/G21); BMW M4 (G82/G83)

Powertrain
- Engine: 3.0 L S58B30T0 twin-turbo I6
- Transmission: 6-speed ZF GS6-53BZ manual (except xDrive models); 8-speed ZF 8HP automatic

Dimensions
- Wheelbase: 2,857 mm (112.5 in)
- Length: 4,801 mm (189.0 in)
- Width: 1,903 mm (74.9 in)
- Height: 1,438 mm (56.6 in)
- Curb weight: 1,719 kg (3,789 lb)

The full M version of the G20 3 Series is powered by the BMW S58 turbocharged straight-six engine that debuted in the G01 X3 M. The more notable changes for the G80 M3 are a power output of 473 hp, which is a 35 kW (47 hp; 47 hp) increase over the previous F80 M3, and the adoption of the twin-kidney grille from the 4 Series, which was notably controversial among critics. All-wheel drive (xDrive) is optional on the new M3, the first time that an M3 has used a drivetrain layout other than rear-wheel drive. A manual gearbox is available only with rear wheel drive, and is the only transmission available on the standard M3 model.

It is available as a Touring (estate) model, marking the first time BMW has offered an M3 Touring. The G80 M3 went on sale as a 2021 model, with the initial prototypes tested at the Nürburgring alongside the BMW M4 G82. It was officially unveiled on 23 September 2020 alongside the new M4.

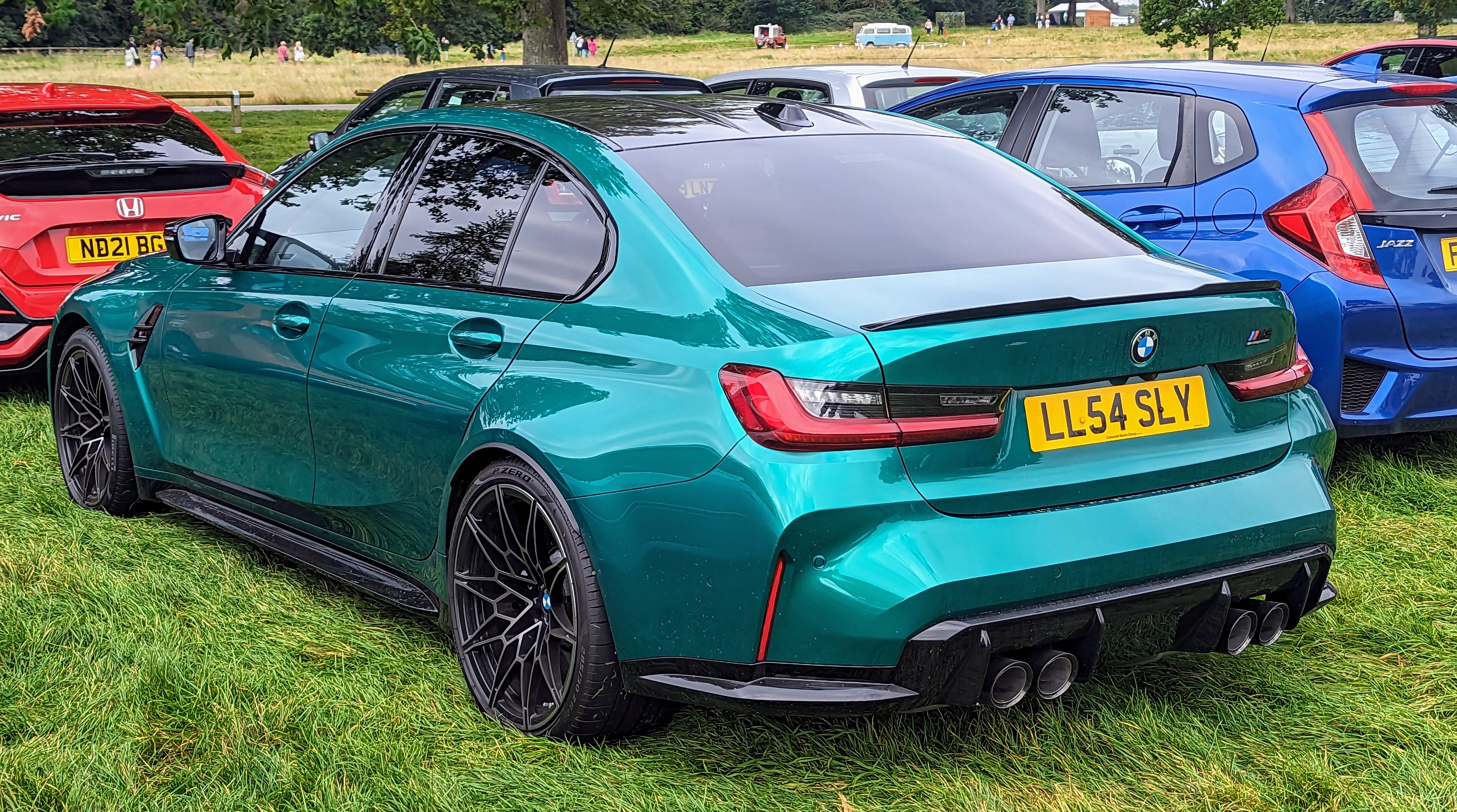
G80 Rear

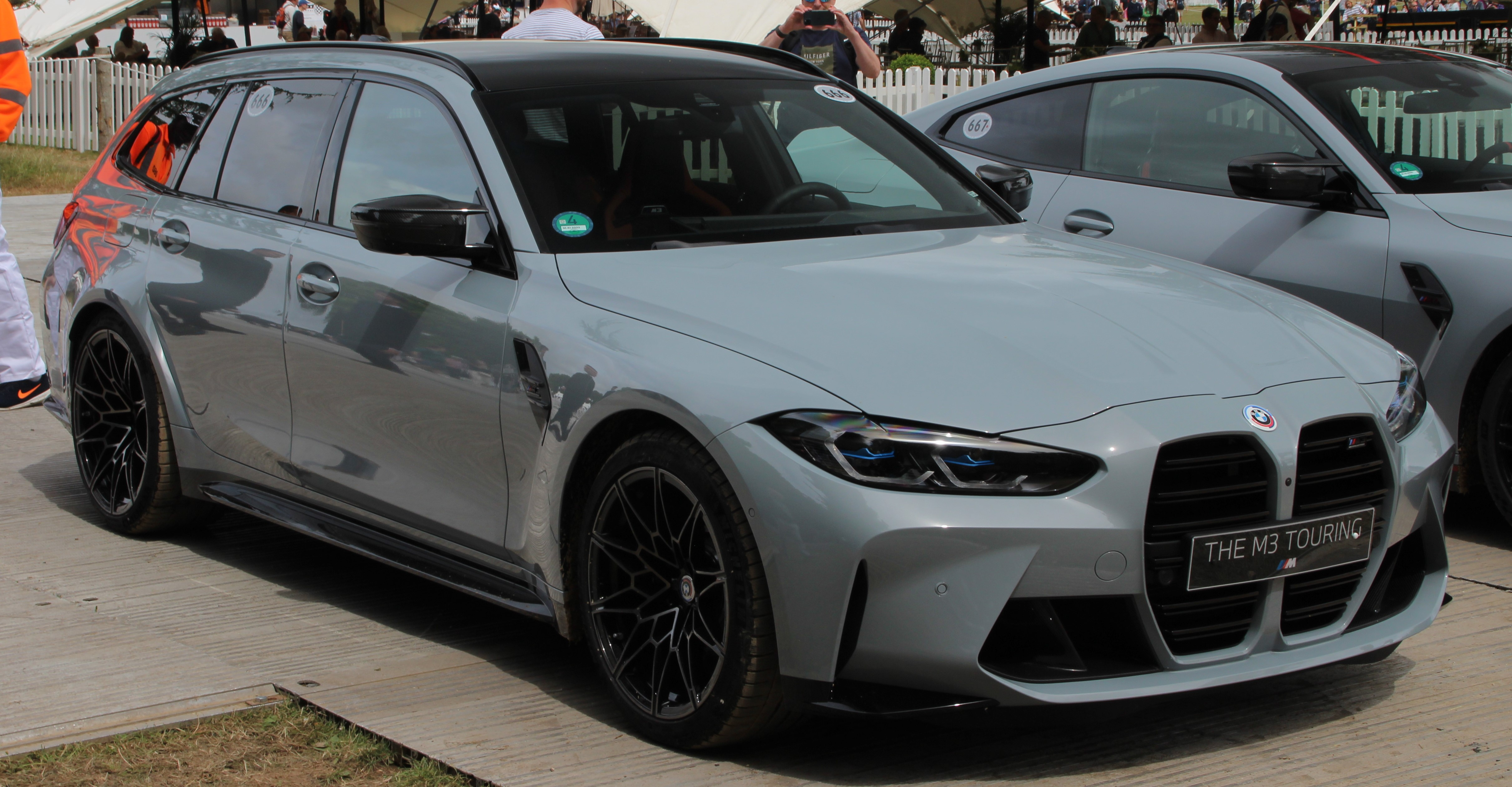
G81 Front (Touring)

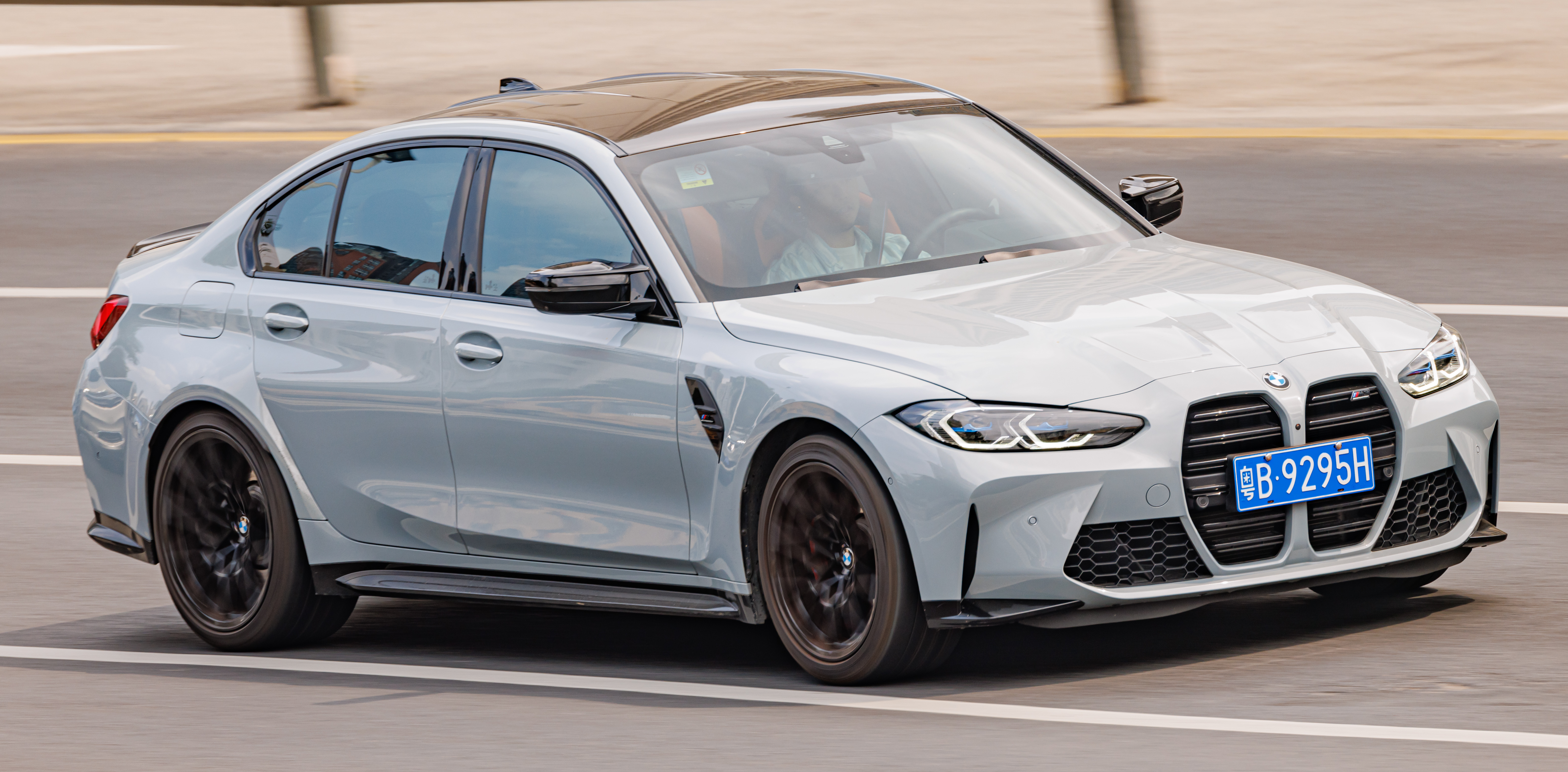
G80 Competition

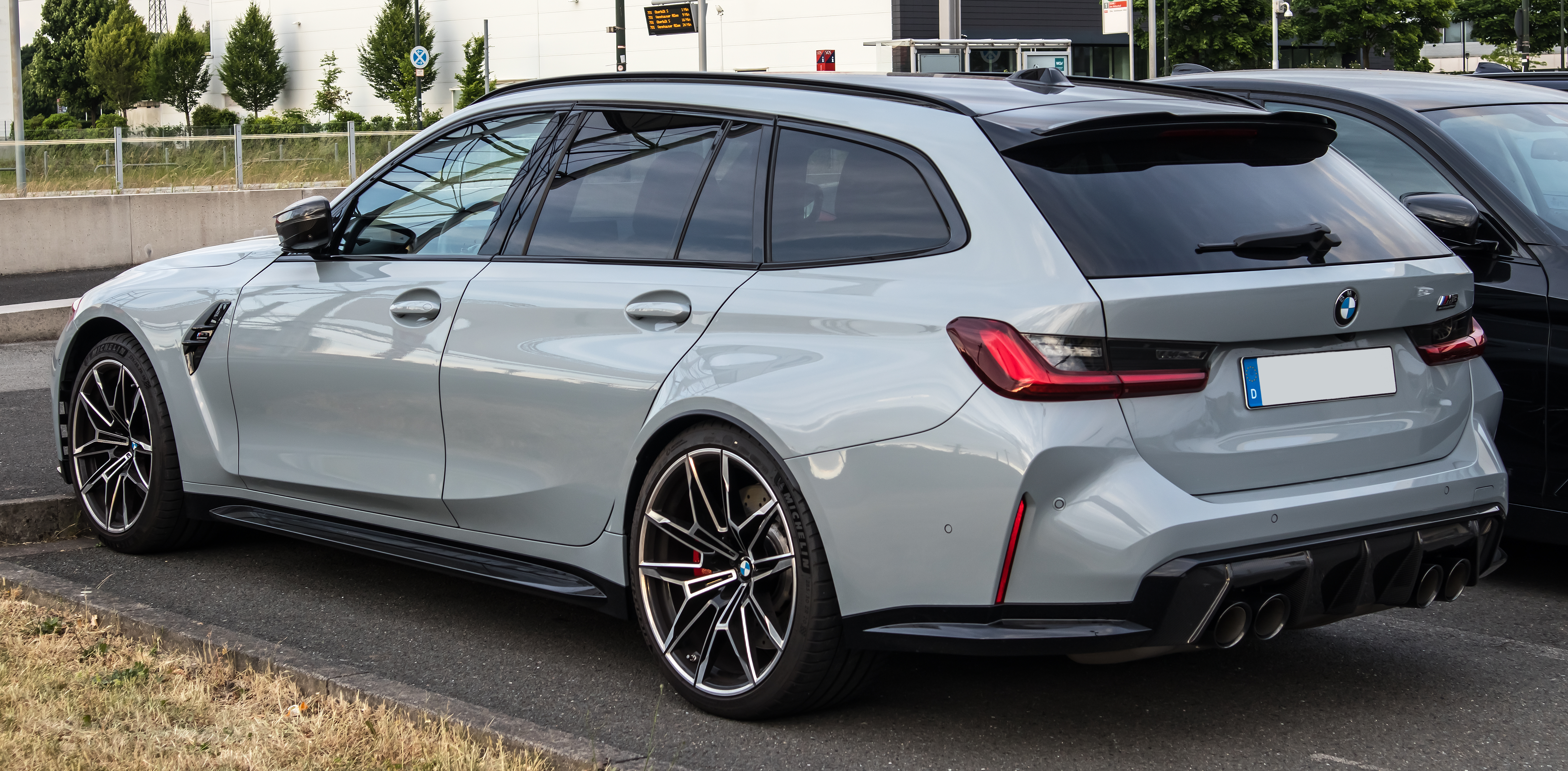
G81 Rear

=== M3 Competition ===
At launch in 2020, the M3 Competition was unveiled alongside the standard M3. Compared to the standard M3, the Competition increases power output by 22 kW (30 PS; 30 hp) to a total of 375 kW (510 PS; 503 hp) and torque is increased by 100 N⋅m (74 lb⋅ft) to 650 N⋅m (479 lb⋅ft), and it is offered exclusively with an 8-speed M Steptronic Sport automatic transmission. The M3 Competition also features a separate transmission oil cooler, black chrome exhaust tips, forged M light-alloy wheels, automatic brake hold function, and high-gloss black mirrors.

=== M3 CS ===
In 2023, at the 24 Hours of Daytona, BMW unveiled the limited-production M3 CS model. The model features a power increase to 405 kW (550 PS; 542 hp) and a weight-reduction of 15 kilograms (33 lb) compared to the M3 Competition xDrive. It is offered only as an all-wheel drive and 8-speed automatic model. BMW will also make 30 units of M3 CS Touring for the Japanese domestic market. In 2027, BMW will offer an M3 CS Handschalter edition that offers a 6-speed manual transmission and rear-wheel drive as a final sendoff for the sixth-generation M3.

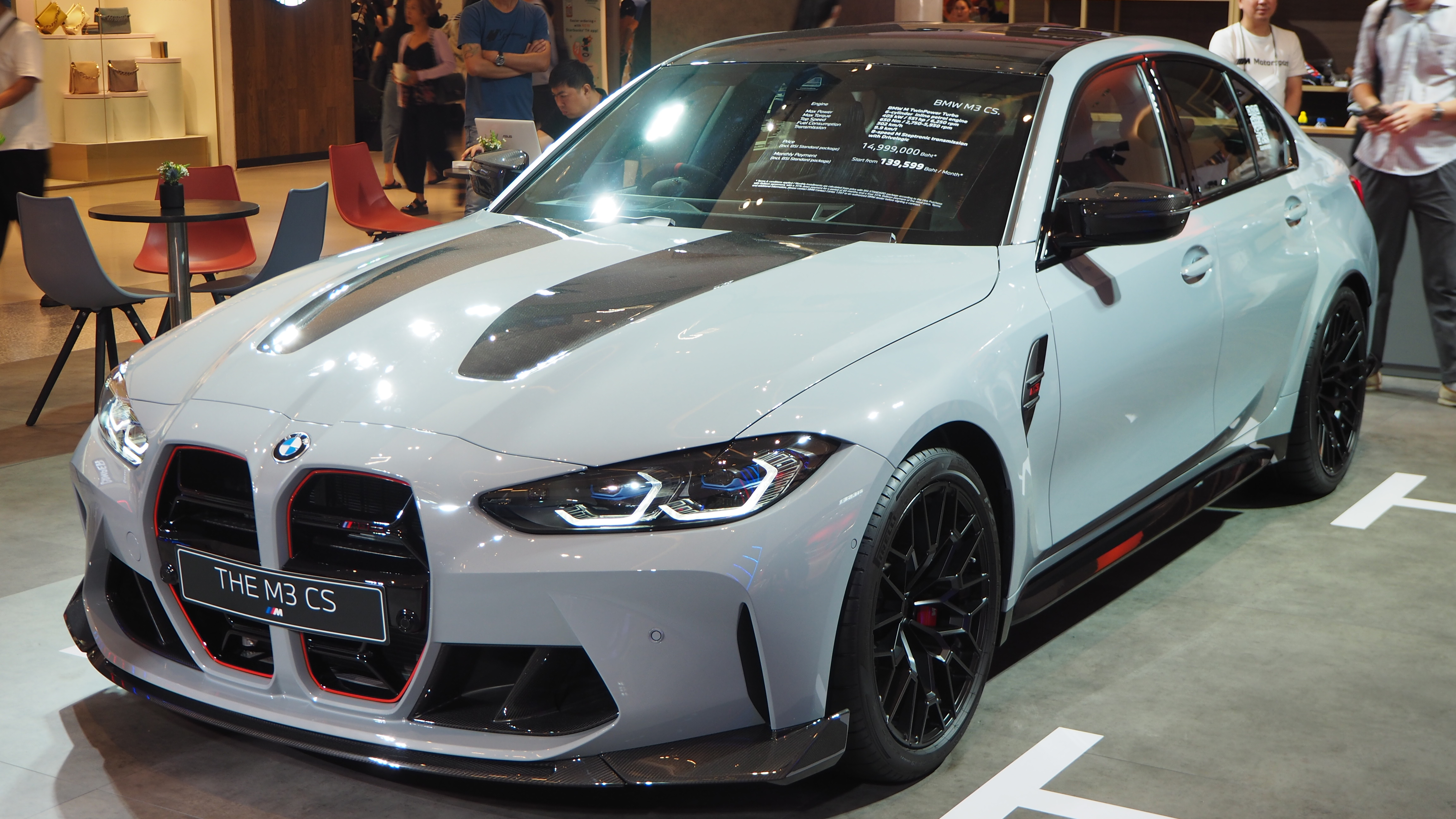
G80 M3 CS

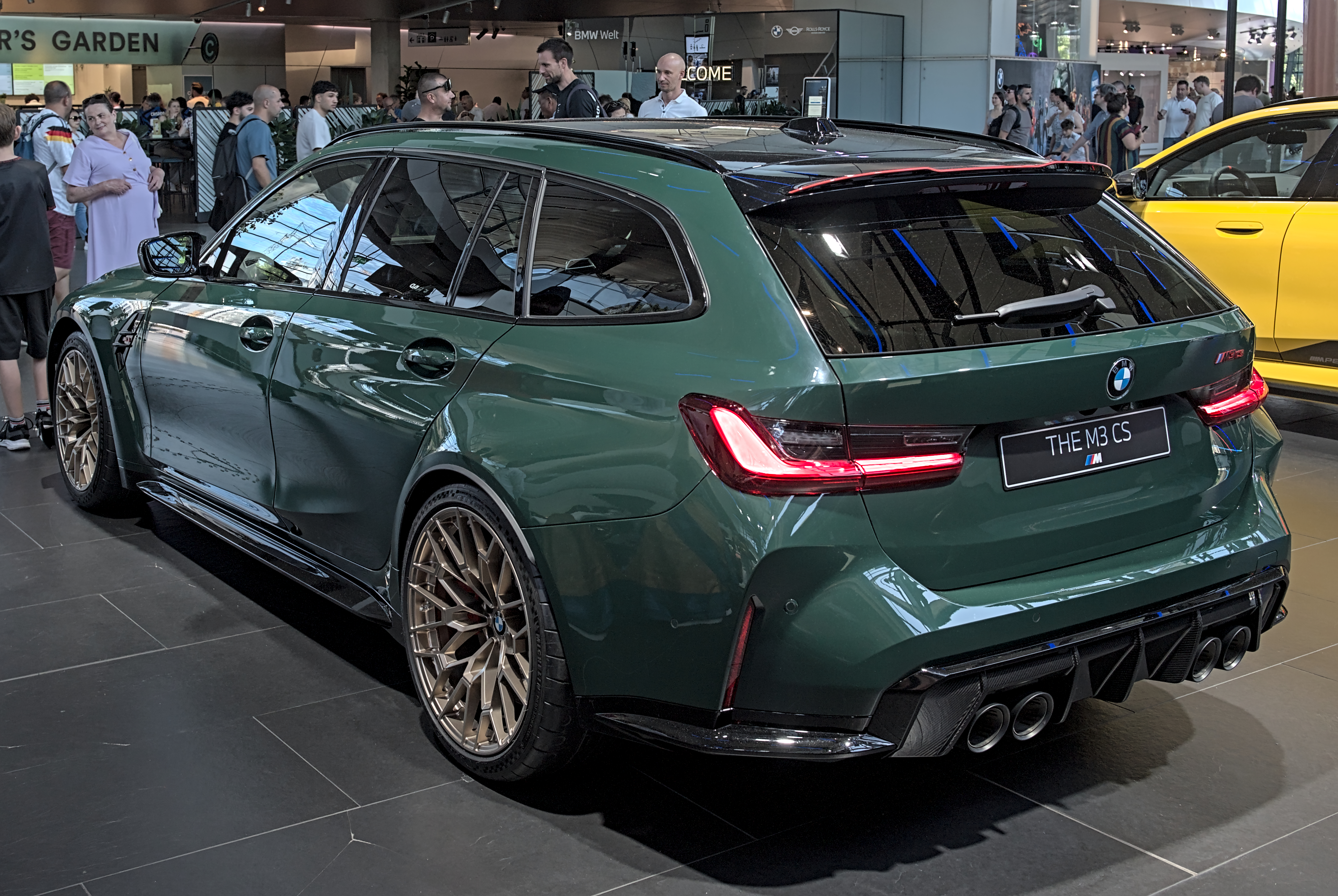
G81 M3 CS

=== Updates ===
In July 2022, for the 2023 model year, the M3 saloon received the new dual curved display featuring iDrive 8, matching the facelifted, standard 3 Series. It replaces the previous separate digital cockpit and infotainment system with iDrive 7. The M3 Touring launched directly with the new display.

=== M Performance Parts ===
M performance parts can be fitted to all models. These include a wing, carbon fibre side skirts, an M Performance exhaust system, canards, a carbon fibre splitter, a carbon fibre diffuser, as well as rear ground effects.

G80 M3 specs
On sale	Model	Power	Torque	Curb Weight	Transmission	Top Speed	Drivetrain
3/2021	M3 saloon (52AY)	353 kW (480 PS; 473 hp)	550 N⋅m (406 lb⋅ft)	1,705 kg (3,759 lb)	6-speed manual	250 km/h (155 mph); 290 km/h (180 mph) with M driver's package	RWD
3/2021	M3 Competition saloon (32AY)	375 kW (510 PS; 503 hp)	650 N⋅m (479 lb⋅ft)	1,730 kg (3,814 lb)	8-speed M Steptronic; Sport Automatic transmission with Drivelogic	250 km/h (155 mph); 290 km/h (180 mph) with M driver's package	RWD
8/2021	M3 Competition xDrive saloon (42AY)	375 kW (510 PS; 503 hp)	650 N⋅m (479 lb⋅ft)	1,780 kg (3,924 lb)	8-speed M Steptronic; Sport Automatic transmission with Drivelogic	250 km/h (155 mph); 290 km/h (180 mph) with M driver's package	4WD
2022	M3 Competition xDrive Touring	375 kW (510 PS; 503 hp)	650 N⋅m (479 lb⋅ft)	1,865 kg (4,112 lb)	8-speed M Steptronic; Sport Automatic transmission with Drivelogic	250 km/h (155 mph); 290 km/h (180 mph) with M driver's package	4WD
2023	M3 CS	405 kW (551 PS; 543 hp)	650 N⋅m (479 lb⋅ft)	1,765 kg (3,891 lb)	8-speed M Steptronic; Sport Automatic transmission with Drivelogic	302 km/h (188 mph)	4WD
2025	M3 Competition xDrive	390 kW (530 PS; 523 hp)	650 N⋅m (479 lb⋅ft)	1,780 kg (3,924 lb)	8-speed M Steptronic; Sport Automatic transmission with Drivelogic	250 km/h (155 mph); 290 km/h (180 mph) with M driver's package	4WD

=== Motorsport ===
Originally an April Fools' Day joke made by BMW in a social media post in 2025, overwhelmingly positive reception from internet users convinced BMW to proceed with the idea of developing a racing version of the M3 Touring model. Nearly a year later on 16 March 2026, BMW formally unveiled the M3 Touring 24H online, sharing images of the car both in studio and on track completing a shakedown. It shares the same platform and many of the same parts as the BMW M4 GT3 Evo, but is 200 millimetres longer, 32 millimetres taller (including the rear wing), and slightly heavier resulting from the estate body style. In the announcement, they confirmed their intention of entering the car in the 2026 24 Hours of Nürburgring in the SP-X experimental vehicles class with factory drivers Connor De Phillippi, Ugo de Wilde, Jens Klingmann, and Neil Verhagen. Against similar Group GT3 homologated competition, the M3 Touring 24H was competitive, partly leading the race and achieving a 4th place finish overall and 1st place in its class.

==== 24 Hours of Nürburgring ====
Year	Entrant	No.	Drivers	Class	Laps	Pos.	Class Pos.
2026	(Germany) Schubert Motorsport	81	(United States) Connor De Phillippi (Belgium) Ugo de Wilde (Germany) Jens Klingmann (United States) Neil Verhagen	SP-X; Pro	156	4th	1st

== Production volumes ==
Global production numbers for 1986–2018
Version	E30 1986–1991	E36 1992–1999	E46 2000–2006	E9x 2007–2013	F80 2014–2018
Saloon		12,603		9,674	34,677
Coupé	17,184	46,525	56,133	40,092	
Convertible	786	12,114	29,633	16,219	
Total	17,970	71,242	85,766	65,985	34,677
