= Rolls-Royce Phantom VII =

Ultra-luxury flagship automobile

Rolls-Royce Phantom
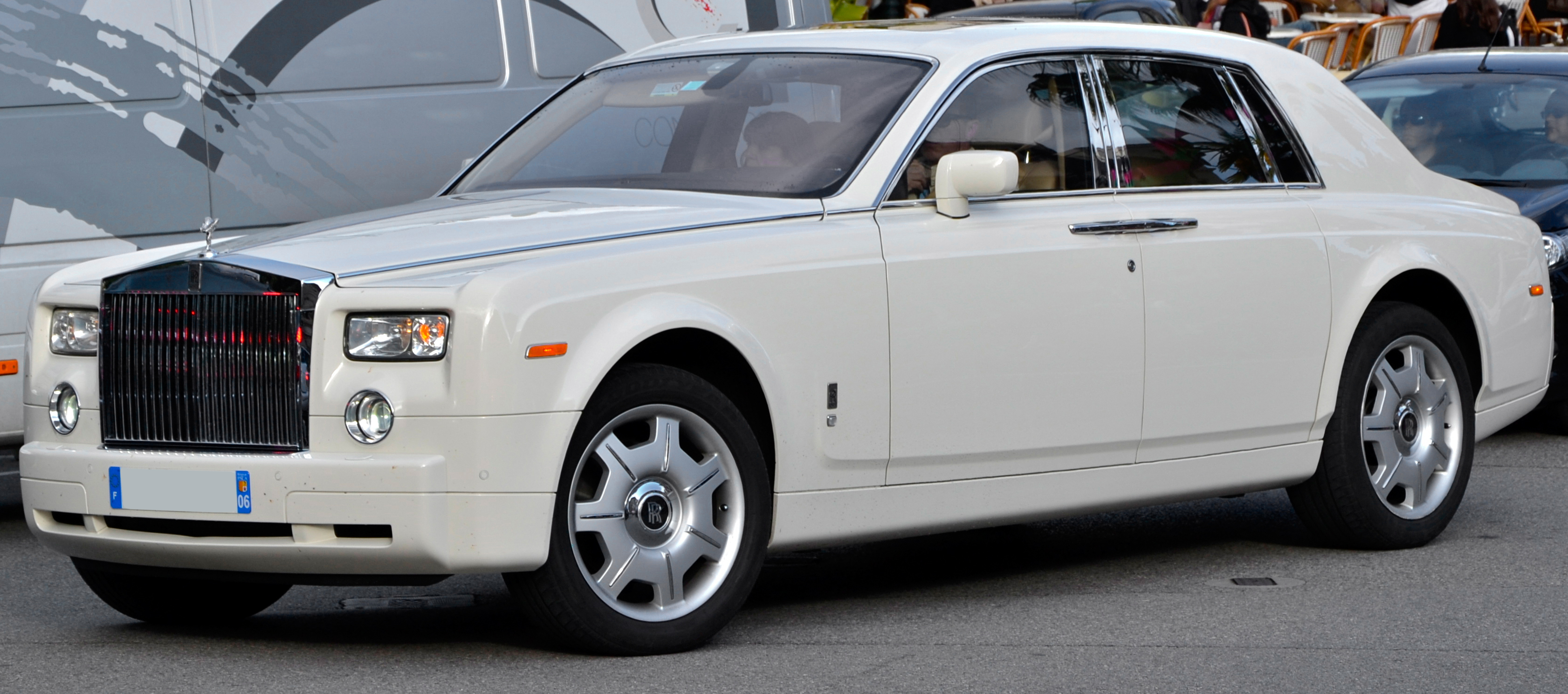

Overview
- Manufacturer: Rolls-Royce Motor Cars (BMW)
- Production: 2003–2017 (Saloon); 2007–2016 (Drophead Coupé); 2008–2016 (Coupé)
- Assembly: United Kingdom: West Sussex, England (Goodwood plant)
- Designer: Marek Djordjevic (exterior: 1999); Charles Coldham (interior)

Body and chassis
- Class: Full-size luxury car (F); Ultra-luxury car
- Body style: 4-door saloon 2-door cabriolet 2-door coupé
- Layout: FR Layout
- Doors: Conventional doors (front)/Coach doors (rear)
- Related: Rolls-Royce Phantom Drophead Coupé; Rolls-Royce Phantom Coupé

Powertrain
- Engine: 6.75 L N73B68 V12 (petrol)
- Transmission: 6-speed 6HP32 automatic (Series I models); 8-speed 8HP70 automatic (Series II models)

Dimensions
- Wheelbase: 3,570 mm (140.6 in) (SWB); 3,820 mm (150.4 in) (EWB)
- Length: 5,834–5,842 mm (229.7–230.0 in) (SWB); 6,084–6,092 mm (239.5–239.8 in) (EWB)
- Width: 1,990 mm (78.3 in) (SWB & EWB)
- Height: 1,632–1,638 mm (64.3–64.5 in) (SWB); 1,634–1,640 mm (64.3–64.6 in) (EWB)
- Curb weight: 2,550–2,560 kg (5,621.8–5,643.8 lb) (SWB); 2,670 kg (5,886.3 lb) (EWB)

Chronology
- Predecessor: Rolls-Royce Silver Seraph
- Successor: Rolls-Royce Phantom VIII

The Rolls-Royce Phantom is a full-sized luxury saloon car made by Rolls-Royce Motor Cars. Launched in 2003, it was the first Rolls-Royce developed and introduced after BMW purchased the right to use the Rolls-Royce name and logo in 1998. It was the seventh Rolls-Royce design to use the Phantom nameplate.

It is credited with successfully reviving the Rolls-Royce brand and restoring Rolls-Royce's reputation as a maker of luxury cars.

The Phantom Drophead Coupé and Phantom Coupé are two-door derivatives of the Phantom launched in 2007 and 2008, respectively.

From 2003 until the launch of the smaller Ghost in 2009, the Phantom was the only car produced by Rolls-Royce. The Phantom acted as the company's flagship model but was less exclusive than all previous Phantoms (none of which surpassed 600 per year).

Production of the car ceased in January 2017, with the Rolls-Royce Phantom VIII launching later that year.

== Initial release (2003–2012) ==
=== Construction ===
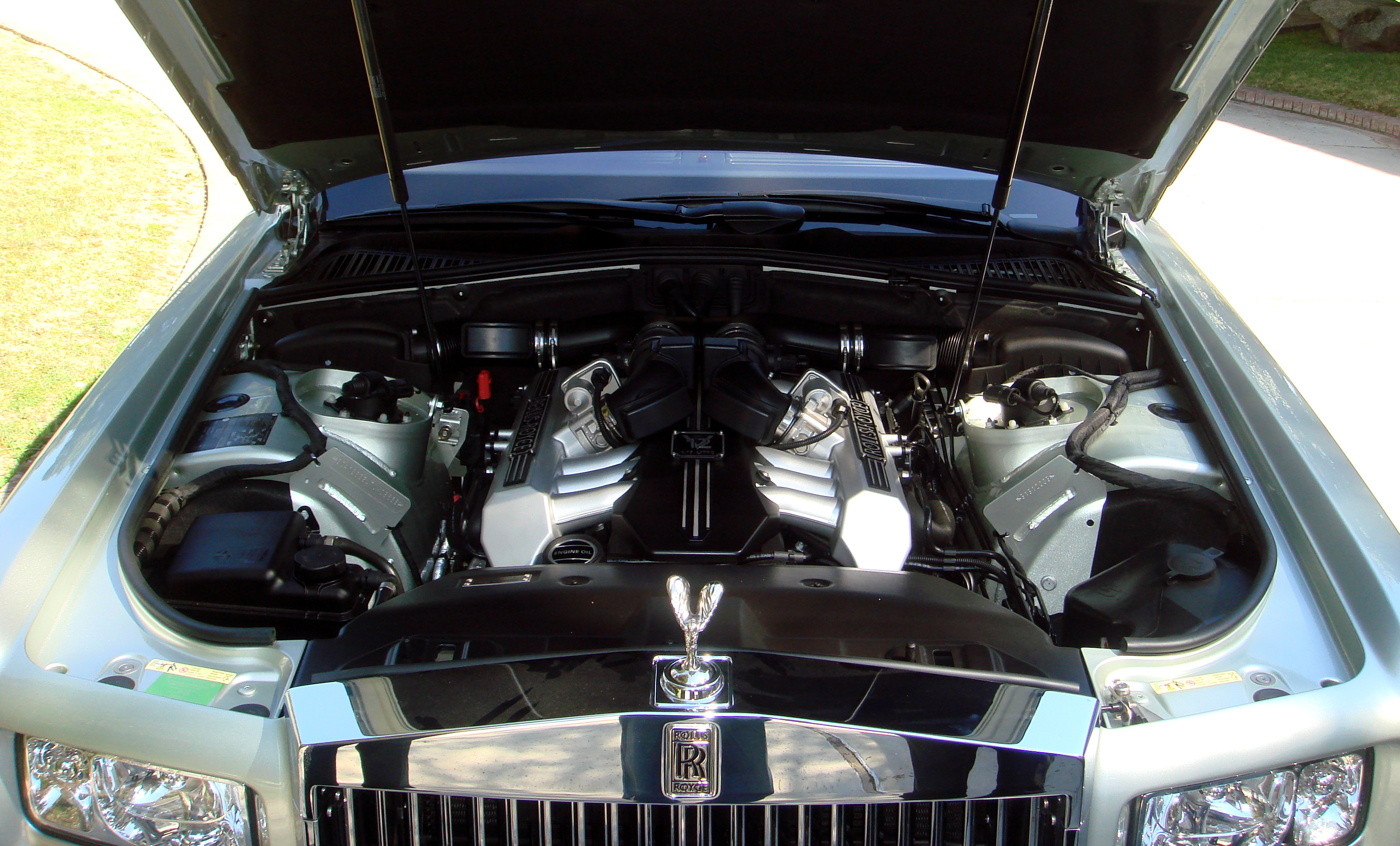
V12 engine of a 2008 Phantom

The Phantom uses a unique chassis platform, body, interior and retains traditional Rolls-Royce design cues. The body is mostly aluminium.

Final assembly, including all body, paint, wood, and leather work, is completed to each customer's individual specification at the Rolls-Royce plant in Goodwood, West Sussex. The plant is close to the historic Goodwood Motor Racing Circuit.

The plant contains a paint shop, body shop, leather shop, woodworking shop, assembly line, and executive offices under one roof. There are only three robots in the factory. The robots paint the body; the paint is polished by hand after the robots spray each coat. The coach lines, which are exactly 3 mm (0.1 in) wide, are done, as well as all other work, by hand, in keeping with the Rolls-Royce tradition.

The aluminium extrusions that are used to construct the aluminium spaceframe are produced in Norway using hydroelectric power, shaped and machined in Denmark and finally hand-welded in Germany.

The Phantom is 1.63 m (64.2 in) tall, 1.99 m (78.3 in) wide, 5.83 m (229.5 in) long, weighs, 2,485 kg (5,478 lb) and can accelerate to 100 km/h (62 mph) in 5.9 seconds.

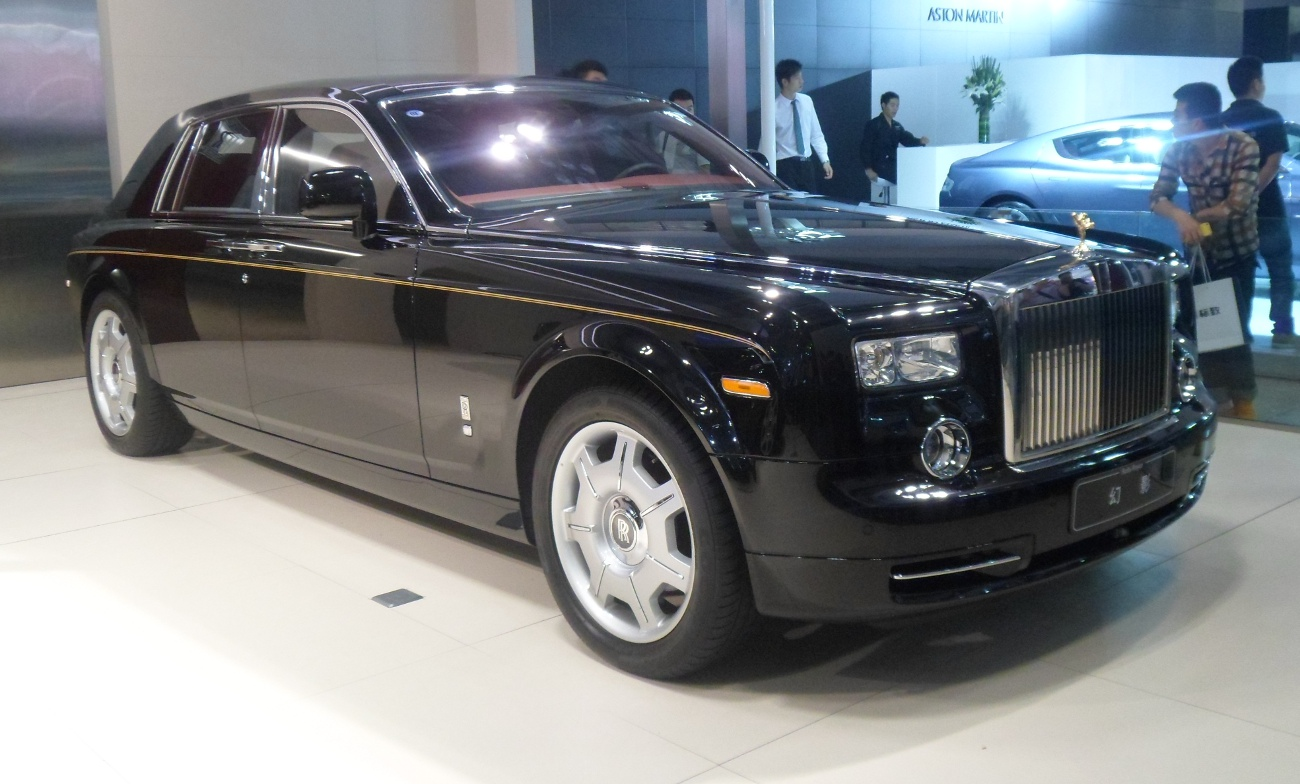
Rolls-Royce Phantom Series I front view

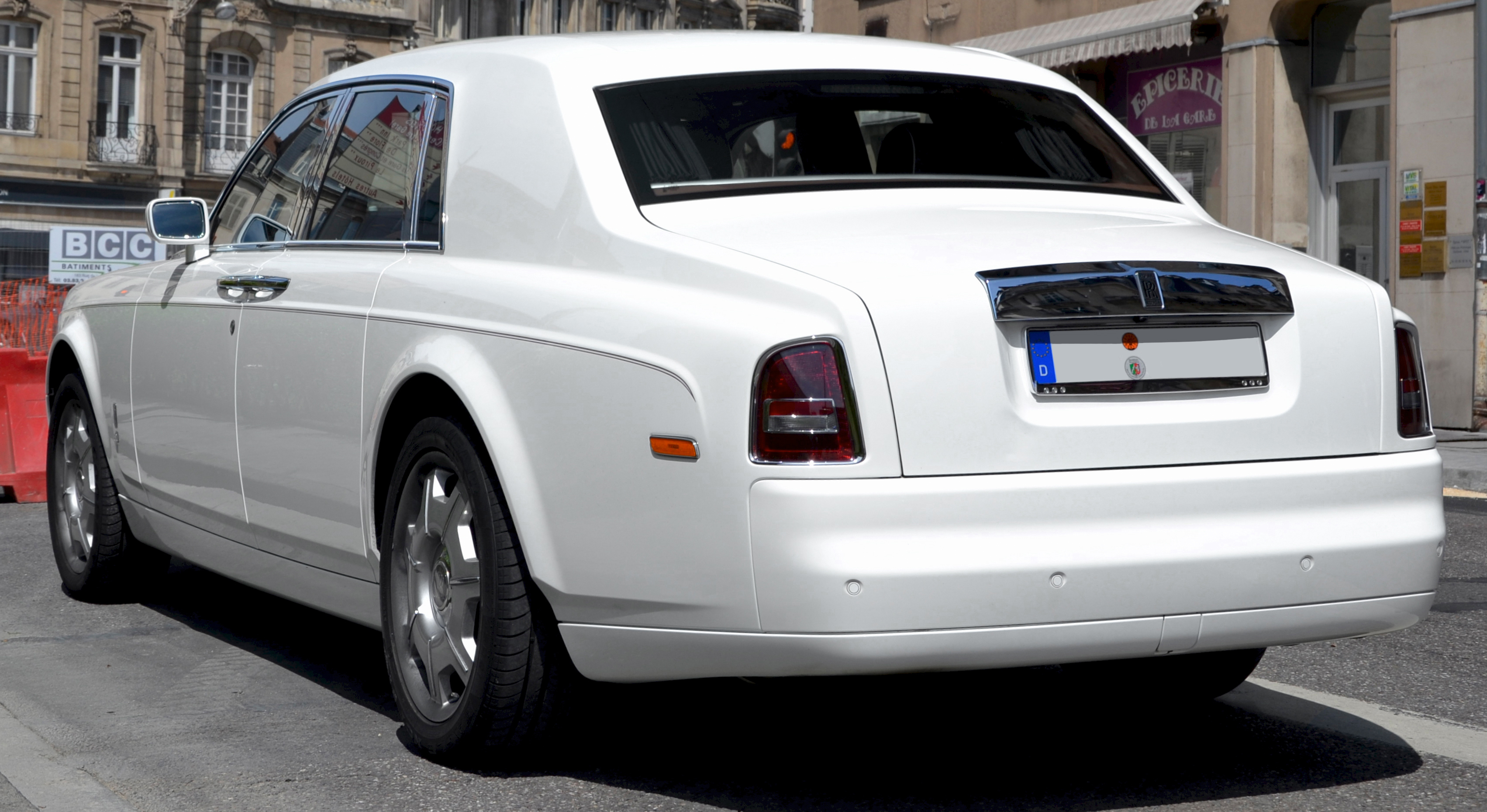
Rolls-Royce Phantom Series I rear view

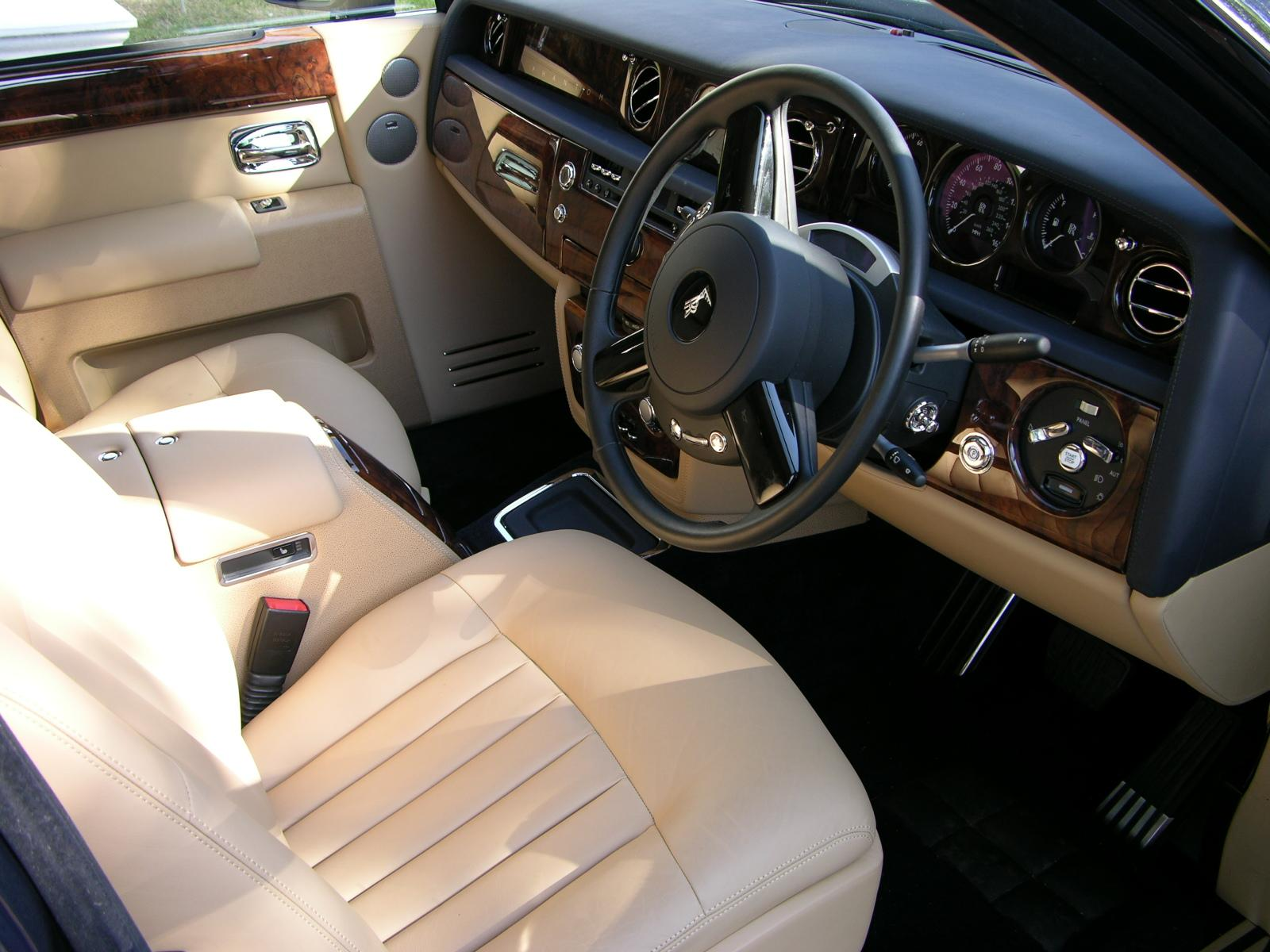
Interior (Series I)

- Customers can choose from 44,000 paint colours, and specify any leather colour.
- The vehicle's unique instrument panel has no tachometer. Instead, it has a power reserve dial that indicates how much of the engine's power is not being used and is available to the driver.
- The rear doors are rear-hinged, a style commonly referred to as suicide doors but called 'coach doors' by Rolls-Royce, a feature traditionally offered since the first Phantom was introduced in 1925. Because of the rear-seating position in relation to the rear inner-door handles, buttons are mounted on both C-pillars, which operate hydraulic motors in order to close the rear doors. An electronic lock prevents the doors from being accidentally opened when moving.
- The car will automatically brake to a walking speed if a coach door remains open when driving off.
- When the front or rear doors are opened, umbrella compartments built into the rear doors are accessible. The factory-supplied umbrellas are Teflon coated, so they and the compartment in which they are stored dry out faster.
- The traditional Spirit of Ecstasy ornament has an automatic electronic retraction mechanism to prevent theft and protect pedestrians in the event of an accident. It may also be retracted by the driver at the touch of a button or when the alarm is armed. The ornament base contains a sensor that detects movement and retracts if someone tampers with it.
- The "RR" logos on each of the wheel hubs are independent bezels in order to always remain upright while the wheel is rotating.

=== Luxury amenities ===
Features (as of 2009) include a navigation system with voice recognition, power sunroof, upgraded leather upholstery, rear-view camera, rear-seat DVD entertainment system, 15-speaker Lexicon Logic7 premium sound system, 8-disc CD changer, 18-way power front seats, 16-way power rear seats, heated and cooled cup holders, rear-seat tables, outside-temperature indicator, universal garage door opener, power tilt/telescopic heated wood and leather-wrapped steering wheel with radio, climate, and navigation controls, power open/close boot lid, power closing doors, wireless headphones, iPod adapter, refrigerator, and air conditioning with 5-zone climate controls. There are extensive options available through the Rolls-Royce "Bespoke" programme through which the factory will create any reasonable option a customer asks for.

=== Safety recall ===
In October 2010, the Phantom was included in a recall involving cars with a V8 or V12 engine from BMW because of the potential to develop a leak in the power braking system.

=== Phantom Extended Wheelbase (2005–2012) ===
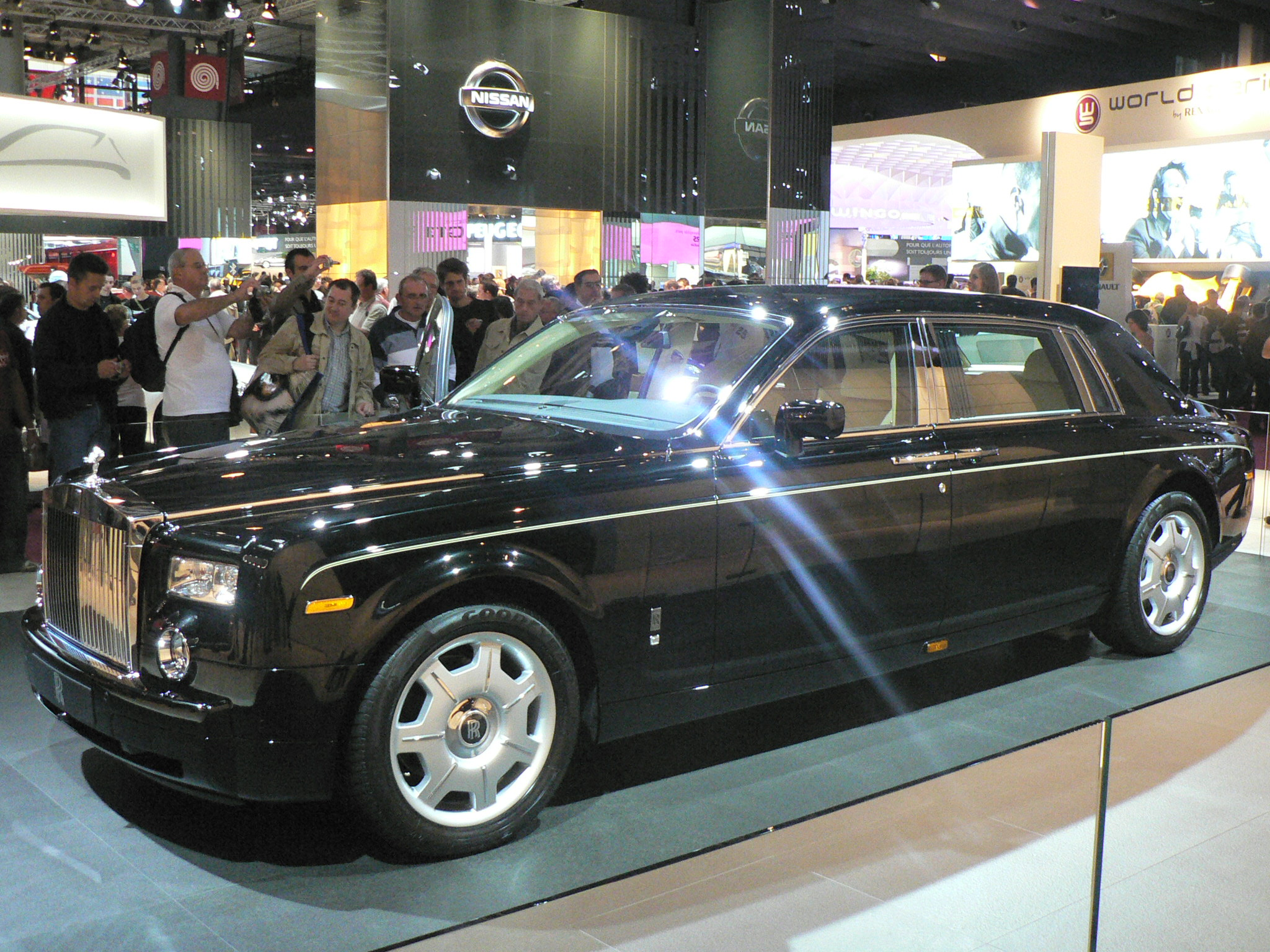
Rolls-Royce Phantom Series I EWB front view

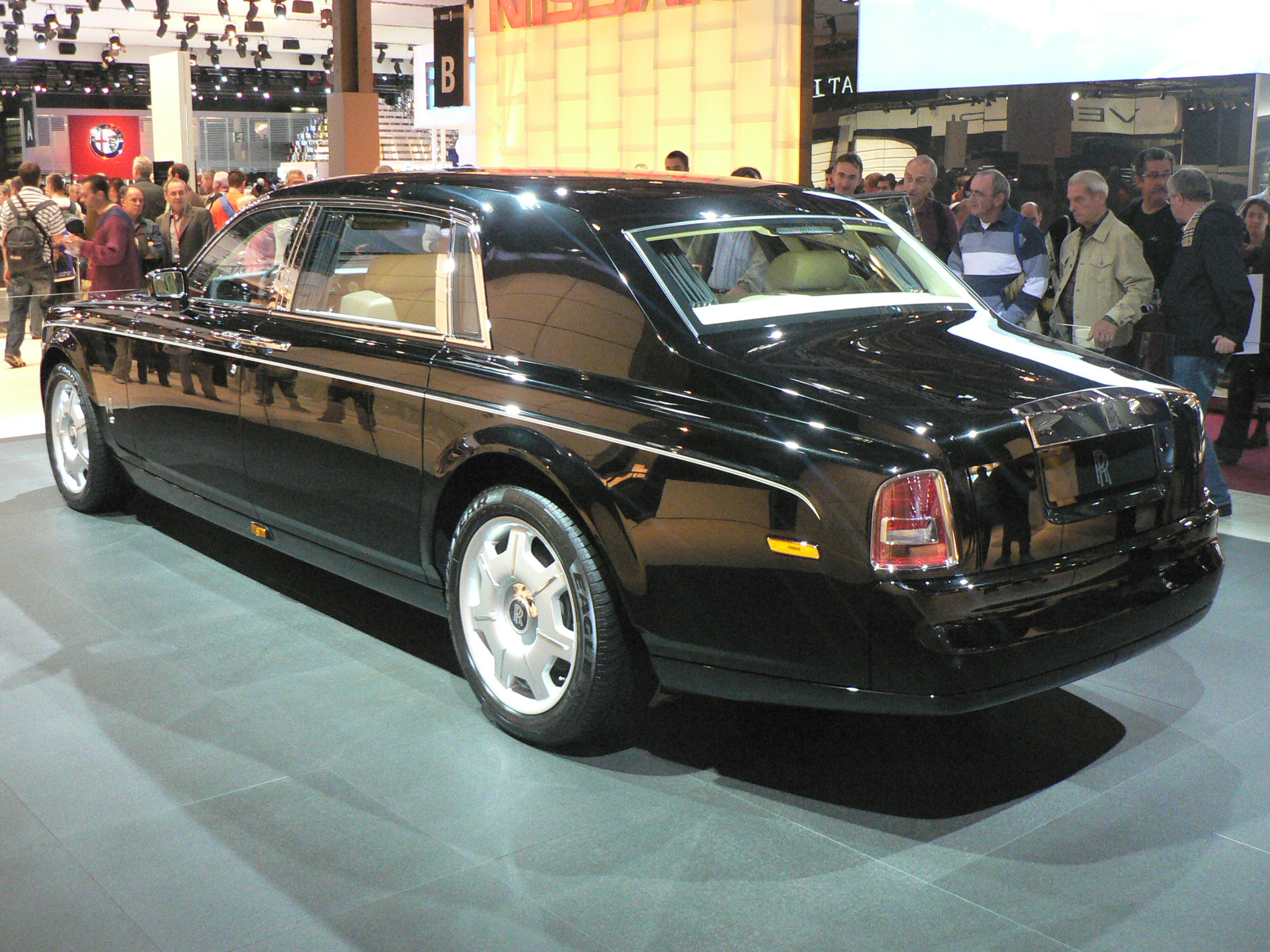
Rolls-Royce Phantom Series I EWB rear view

An extended wheelbase Phantom was presented in March 2005 at the Geneva Motor Show, which is 250 mm (9.8 in) longer than the standard Phantom. It is currently referred to as the Phantom Extended Wheelbase (or EWB).

=== Phantom Drophead Coupé (2007–2017) ===
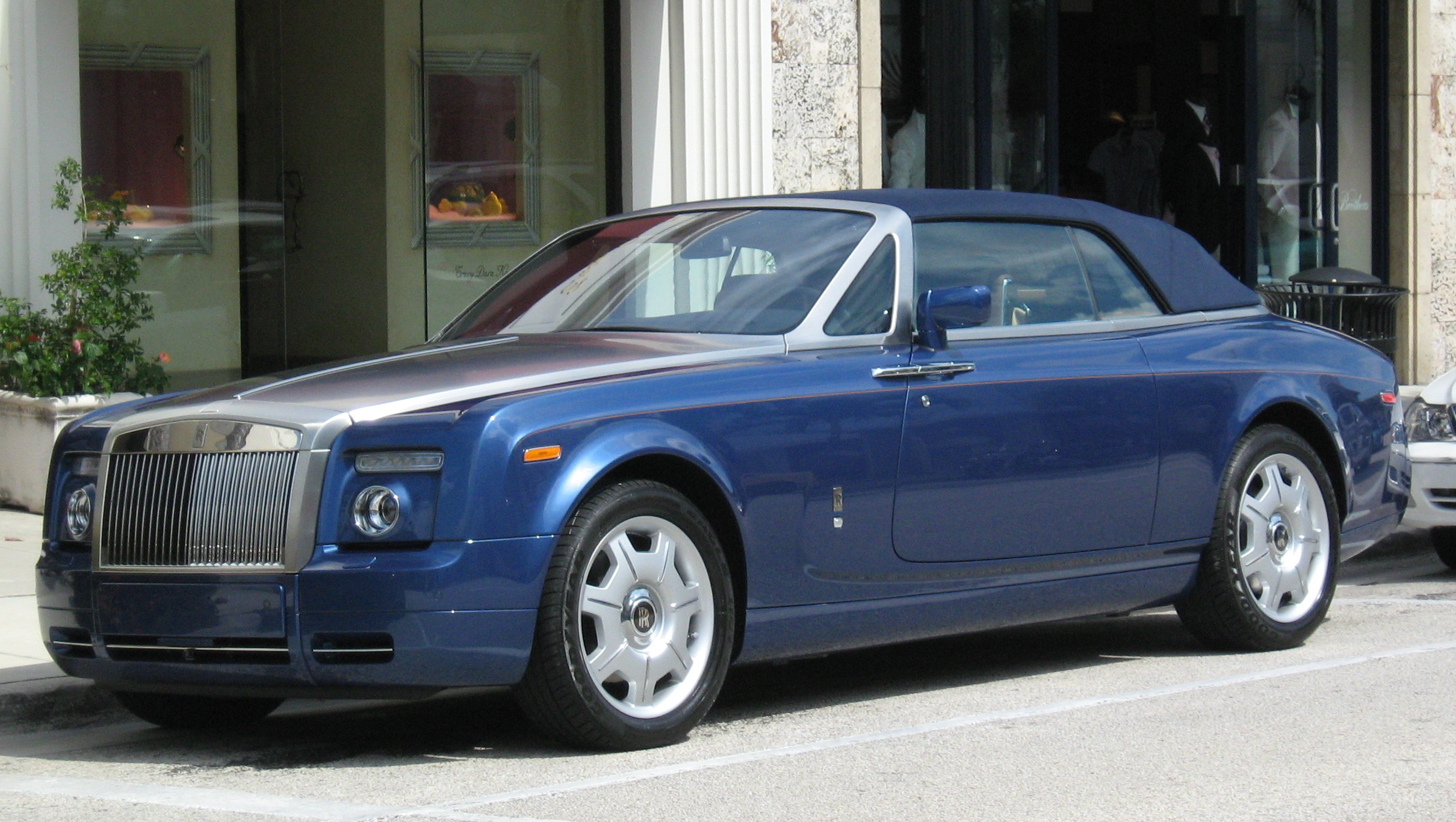
Rolls-Royce Phantom Drophead coupé (Series I) front view

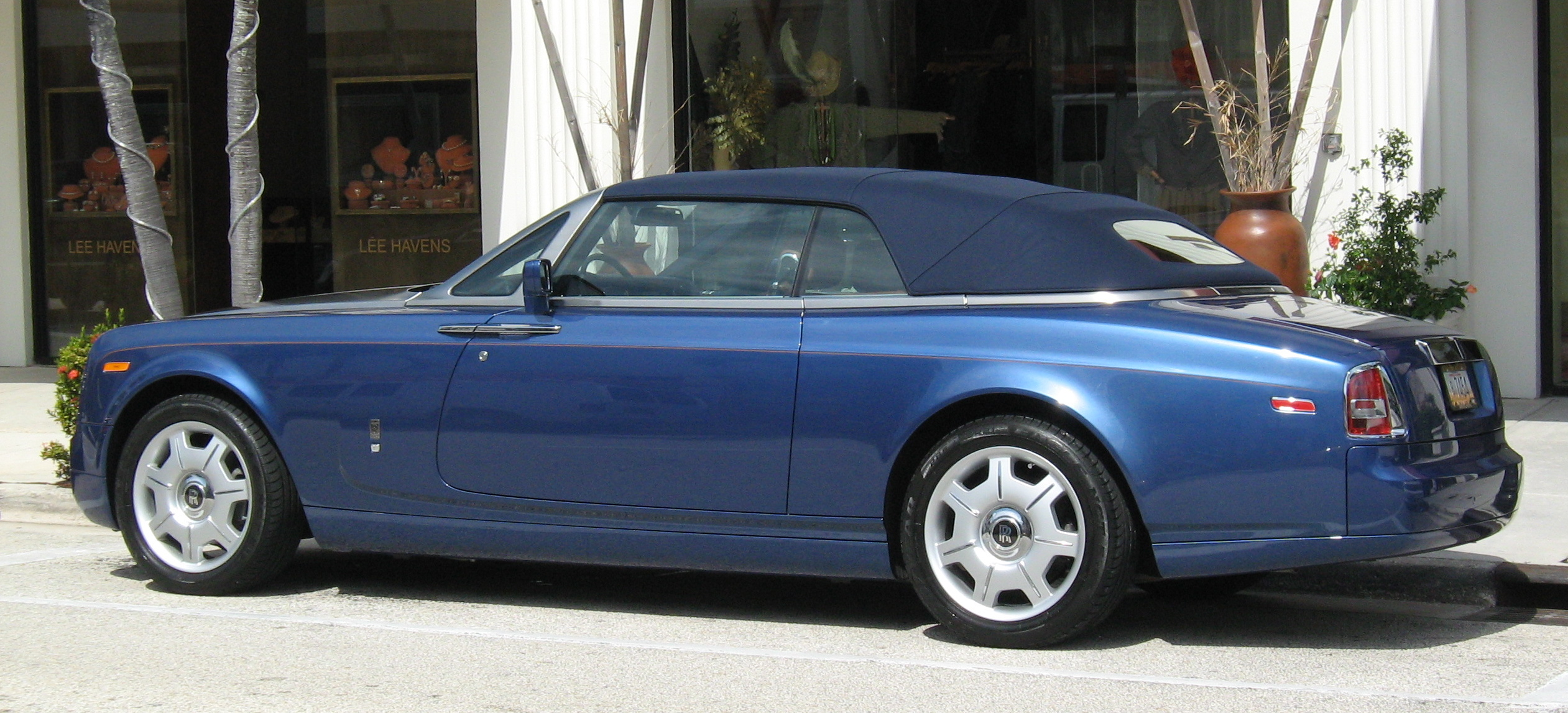
Rolls-Royce Phantom Drophead coupé (Series I) rear view

The Phantom Drophead Coupé is a 2-door convertible version of the Phantom. It was unveiled at the 2007 North American International Auto Show.

The design of the Drophead was previewed by the 100EX design study, which Rolls-Royce revealed at the 2004 Geneva Motor Show.

Production of the Drophead commenced in June 2007.

=== Armoured Rolls-Royce Phantom (2007–2017) ===
This is an armoured version of the Rolls-Royce Phantom with a VR7 level ballistic rating. It includes fibre composites and special purpose steel body armour, thickened glass sheets in the glazed area, polycarbonate layer, strengthened aluminium spaceframe chassis and suspension components.

The vehicle went on sale initially in Europe and the Middle East.

=== Phantom Coupé (2008–2016) ===
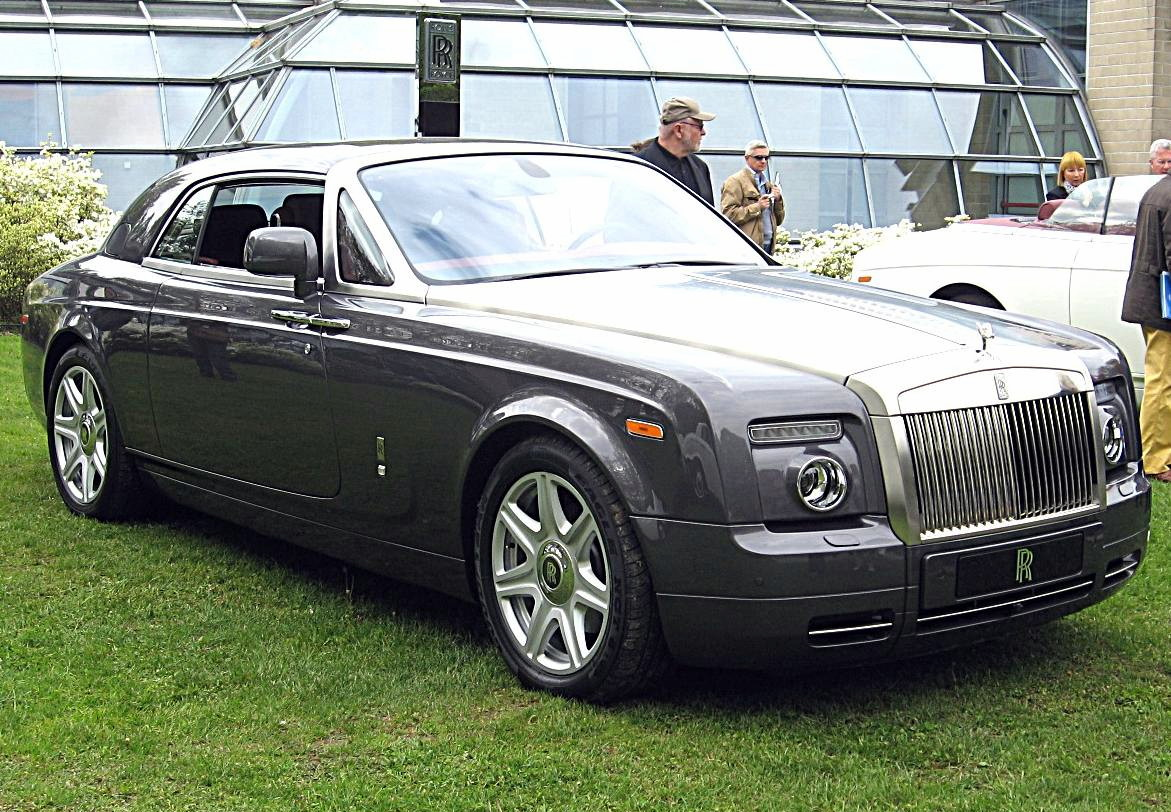
Rolls-Royce Phantom coupé (Series I) front view

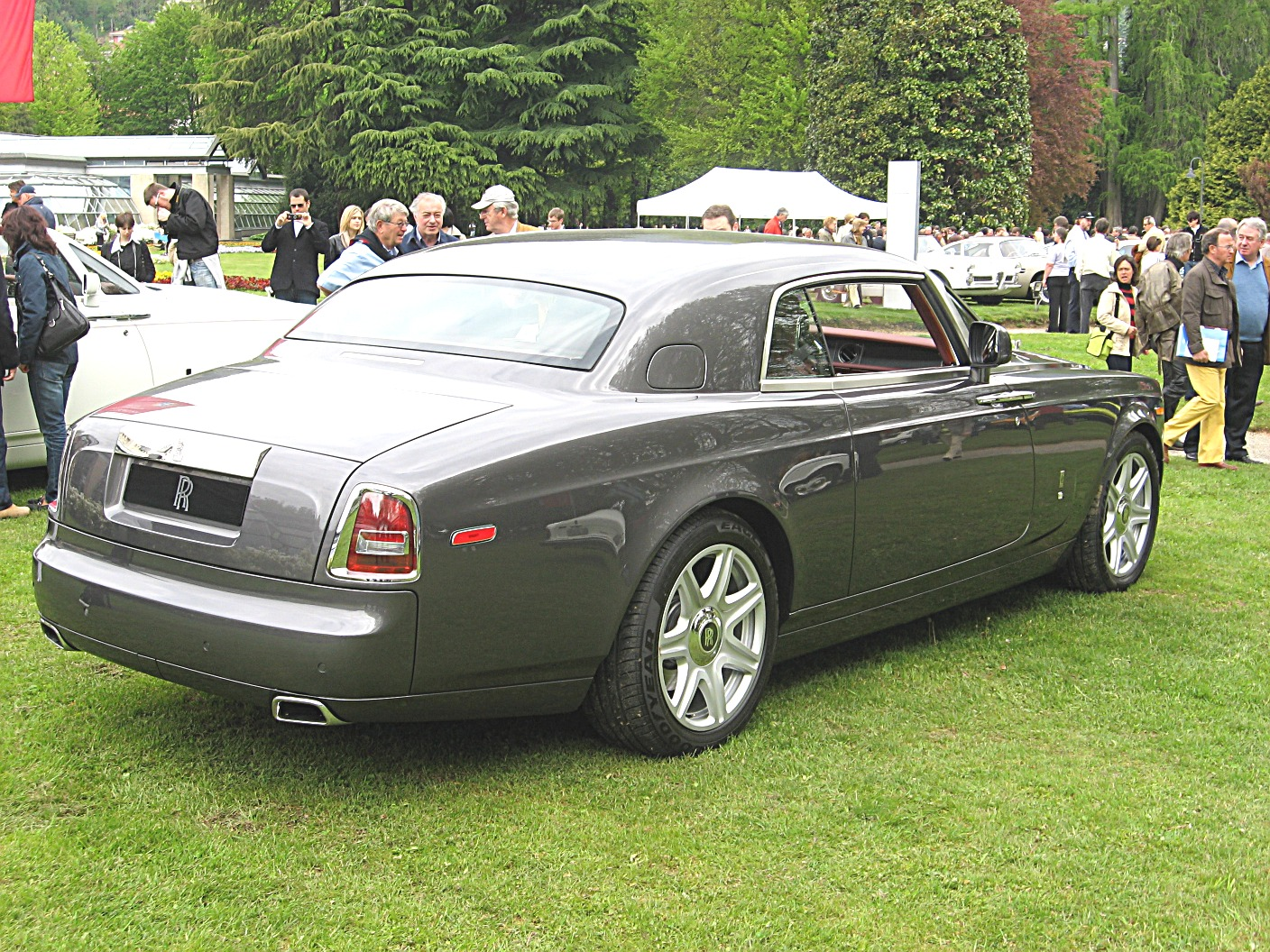
Rolls-Royce Phantom coupé (Series I) rear view

The Phantom Coupé is a 2-door coupé derivative of the Phantom which was unveiled at the 2008 Geneva Motor Show.

The design of the Coupé was previewed by the 101EX concept, which Rolls-Royce revealed at the 2006 Geneva Motor Show.

Production of the Coupé commenced in summer 2008, with sales beginning in autumn of the same year.

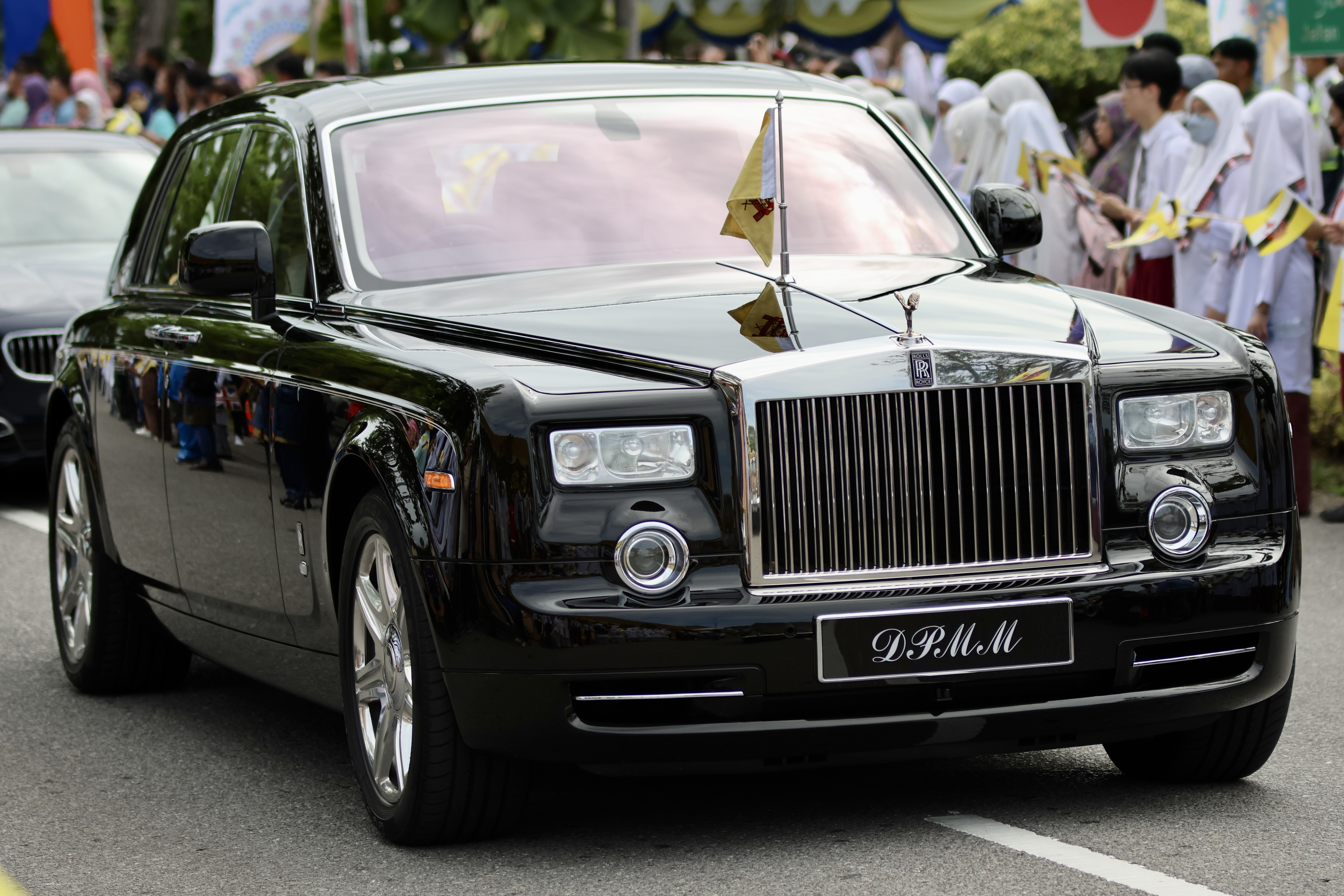
Rolls-Royce Phantom Series I owned by the Crown Prince of Brunei

=== 2009 model year update (2009–2017) ===
Beginning with the 2009 model year, the Phantom and Phantom Extended Wheelbase incorporated the following changes:

- to harmonise the front appearance of the car with that of the Phantom Drophead Coupé and Phantom Coupé, the front bumper was designed and integrated with a shallower grille, finished in stainless steel
- LED door handle illumination
- 21-inch cast forged aluminium alloy wheels, in either painted or part polished finishes, as standard.
- new RCA component input for auxiliary audio and visual connectivity to the 12-inch monitors mounted within the picnic tables
- new front and rear door cappings with integrated grab handles
- new bi-directional double reading lights in the C-pillar
- climate control, volume control and electric window switches are relocated to a wood veneer panel in the door

Production began at Goodwood in the spring 2009.

== Rolls-Royce Phantom Series II (2012–2017) ==
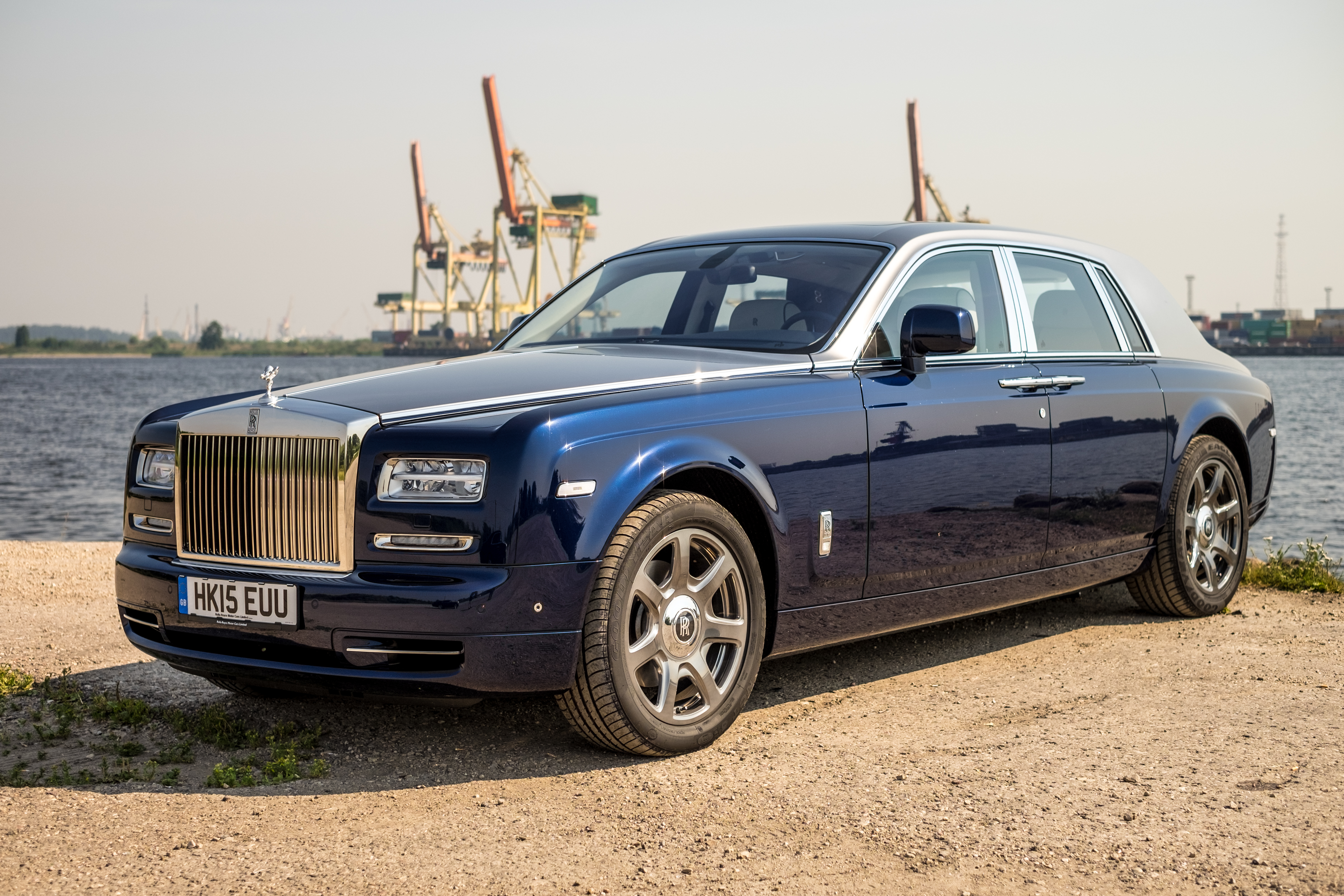
Rolls-Royce Phantom Series II

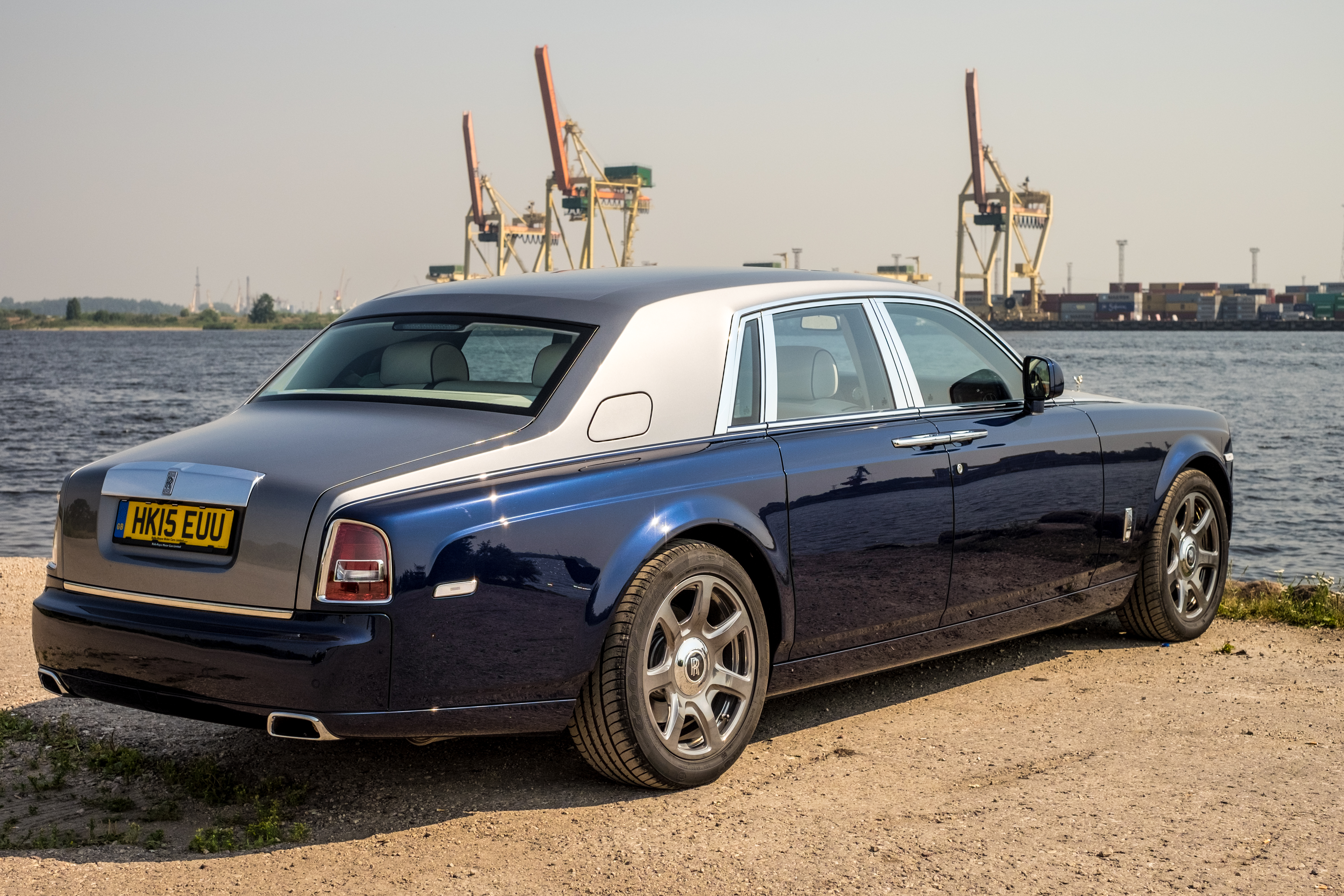
Rolls-Royce Phantom Series II

In May 2012, Rolls-Royce announced the Series II car, to be available from the 2013 model year. Series II, exterior design updates by Andreas Thurner and interior design updates by Alan Sheppard, has a number of updated and improved features, including:

- Replacement of round lower light with complementary rectangular LED light
- One-piece stamped radiator grille
- New single-piece wheels
- New side-badge design
- Extended chrome detailing around the side window
- Highlighting capture strip on the bottom of the boot lid
- Redesigned rear bumper, now one-step over a two-step
- Integrated exhaust detailing, mirroring those on the coupé
- Simplified dashboard, including enlarged 8 inches (200 mm) LCD screen
- Improved systems rotary controller, through the use of the system used on the Ghost
- Simplified seat designs
- Improved audio, telecoms and connectivity systems
- New 8-speed gearbox

The vehicle was unveiled at the 2012 Geneva Motor Show, Kuala Lumpur, Hong Kong, Rolls-Royce Motor Cars Bangkok (Millionaire Auto).

A version of Phantom Saloon Series II (in blue velvet sparkle body colour) was unveiled at the 2012 Moving Motor Show as a test drive vehicle for selected members of media and VIP.

=== Phantom Extended Wheelbase (2012–2017) ===
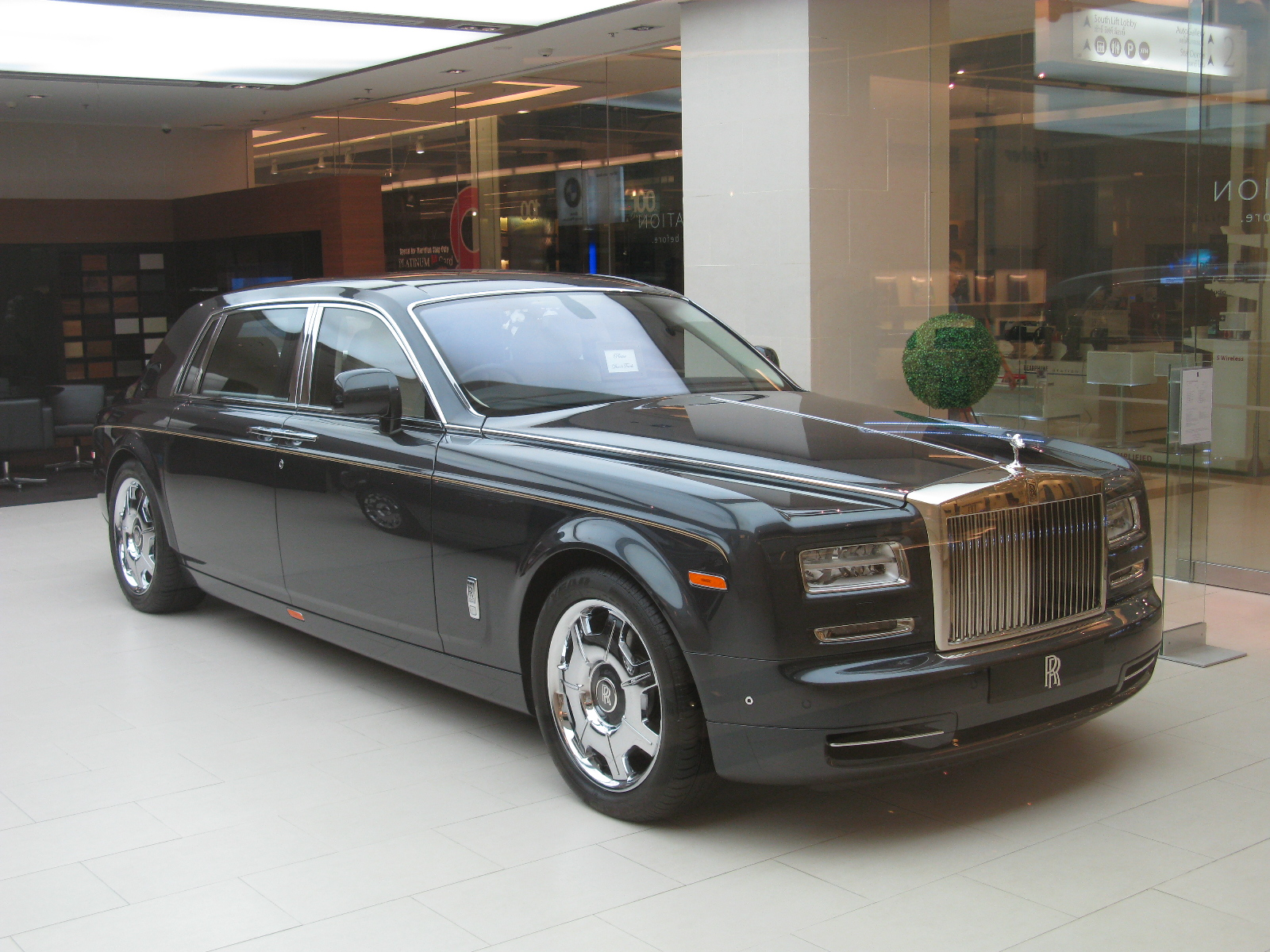
Rolls-Royce Phantom Series II Extended Wheelbase front view

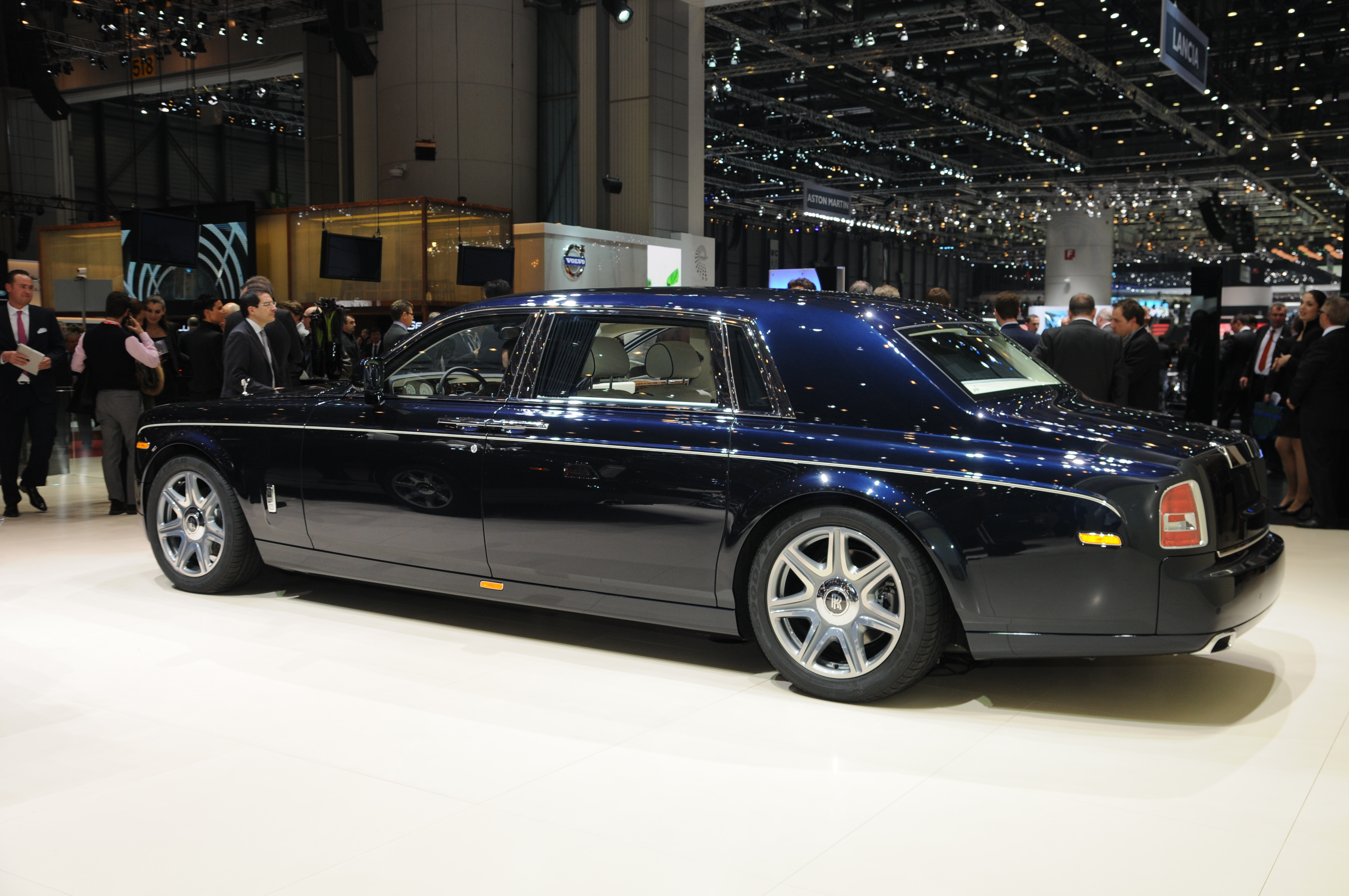
Rolls-Royce Phantom Series II Extended Wheelbase rear view

The vehicle was unveiled at Auto China 2012, followed by Auto Expo Macau 2012 (in Infinity Black body colour, gold Spirit of Ecstasy, drinks cabinet and coolbox for individual seats, starlight headlining), Rolls-Royce Motor Cars Bangkok (Millionaire Auto). The Phantom EWB also has power reclining rear seats and the most legroom ever in a production car, 53.1 inches.

=== Phantom Series II Coupé (2012–2016) ===
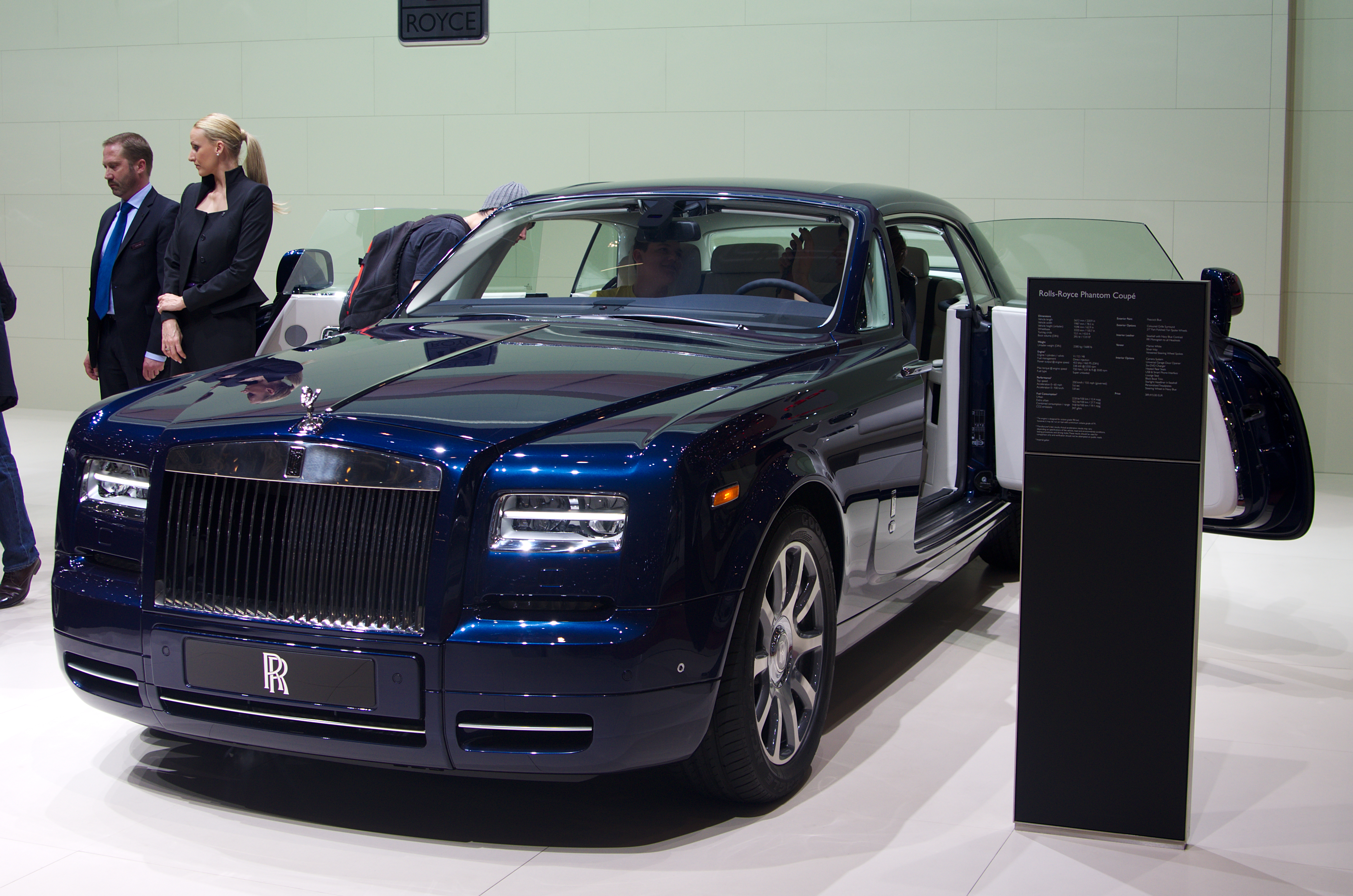
Phantom Series II coupé front view

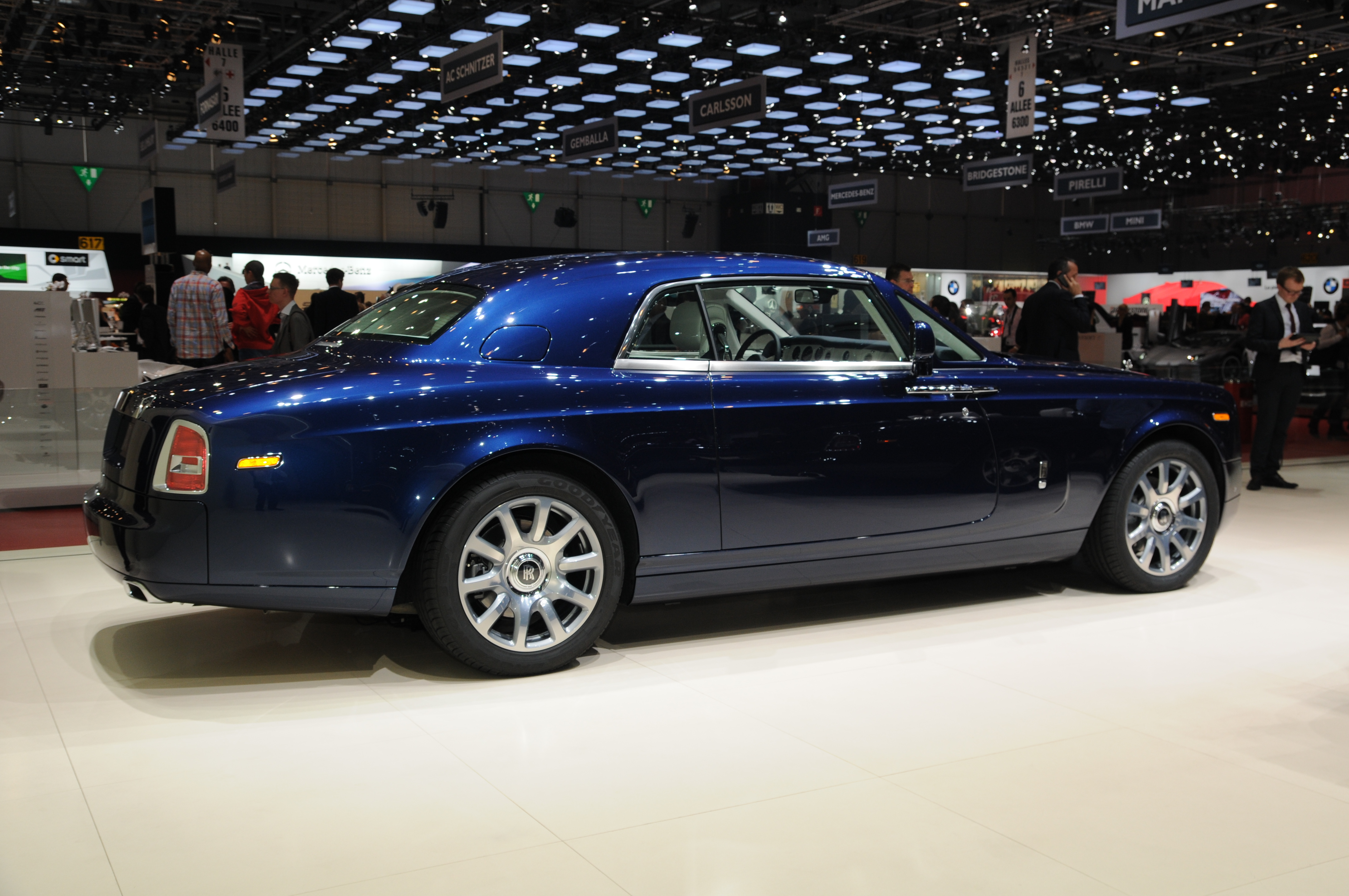
Phantom Series II coupé rear view

This is the coupé version of the Rolls-Royce Phantom Series II. It was unveiled in Auto Expo Macau 2012. The car has new features such as the

- Infinity Black body colour
- illuminated gold Spirit of Ecstasy
- brushed steel bonnet
- illuminated bespoke tread plates
- starlight headlining

( Some of these features are also apparent on the Drophead coupé as well)

=== Phantom Series II Drophead Coupe (2012–2016) ===
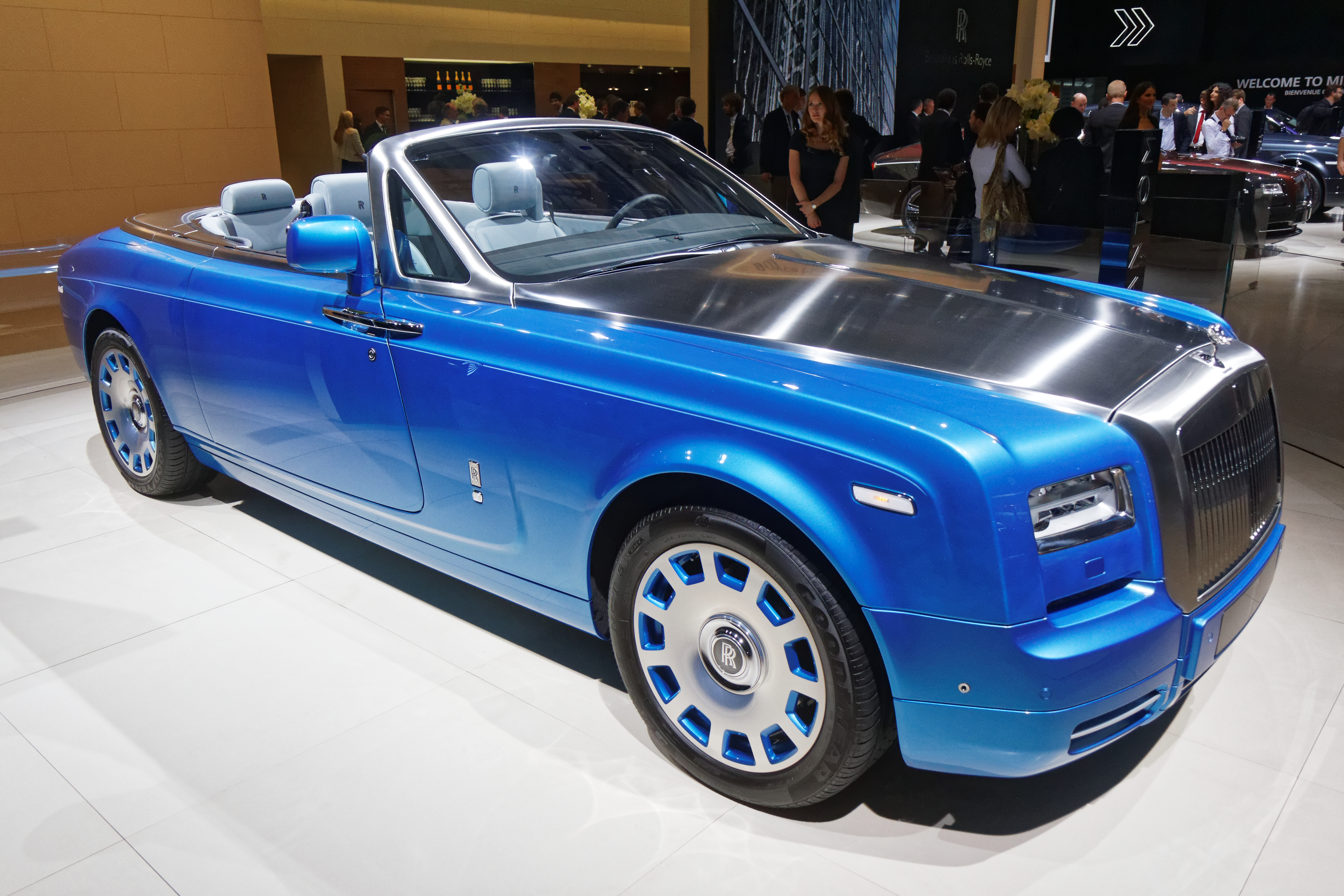
Phantom Series II Drophead front view

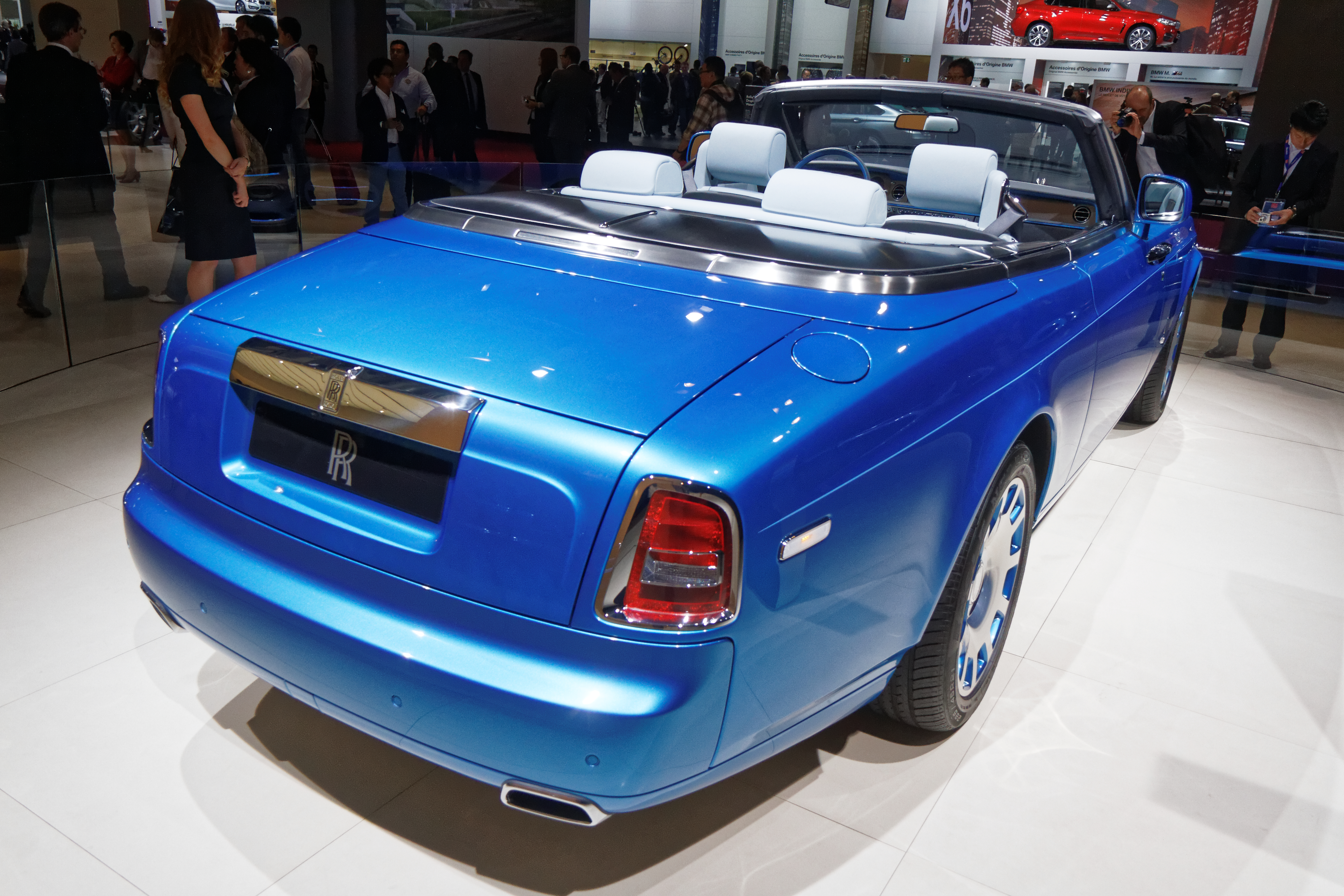
Phantom Series II Drophead rear view

The Phantom Series II Drophead is the 2×2 seater Convertible version of the Phantom Series II. It is based on the chassis of the Series I drophead and the exterior design is virtually unchanged except for the new headlights, identical to the ones equipped on the Series II Phantom Coupé.

== Specifications and performance ==
=== Engines ===
Petrol engines
Model	Years	Type/code	Power@rpm, Torque@rpm	CO_{2} emission (g/km)
Phantom	2003–2012	6,749 cc (411.8 cu in) V12 (N73B68)	460 PS (338 kW; 454 hp)@5350, 720 N⋅m (531 lb⋅ft)@3500	355
Phantom Extended Wheelbase	2005–2012	6,749 cc (411.8 cu in) V12 (N73B68)	460 PS (338 kW; 454 hp)@5350, 720 N⋅m (531 lb⋅ft)@3500	355
Drophead Coupé	2007–2012	6,749 cc (411.8 cu in) V12 (N73B68)	460 PS (338 kW; 454 hp)@5350, 720 N⋅m (531 lb⋅ft)@3500	355
Coupé	2008–2012	6,749 cc (411.8 cu in) V12 (N73B68)	460 PS (338 kW; 454 hp)@5350, 720 N⋅m (531 lb⋅ft)@3500	355

BMW originally intended to use a 9-litre V16 engine in the Phantom but switched to a more economical V12 engine after the Rolls-Royce owners who were invited to the clinic evaluation opined that V16 was much too powerful for their need. The V16 engine was fitted to the concept Rolls-Royce 100EX. A Phantom Coupé with V16 engine was used in the film Johnny English Reborn at a specific request of Rowan Atkinson.

BMW increased the displacement of its 6-litre V12 used in its E65 7-Series to 6,749 cc (6.75 litres), matching the same displacement of Rolls-Royce‘s own classical L-Series V8 engine in production from 1959 to 2002.

=== Transmission ===
All models include ZF 6-speed automatic transmission.

=== Engines ===
Petrol engines
Model	Years	Type/code	Power@rpm, Torque@rpm	CO_{2} emission (g/km)
Phantom	2012–2017	6,749 cc (411.8 cu in) V12 (N73B67)	460 PS (338 kW; 454 hp)@5350, 720 N⋅m (531 lb⋅ft)@3500	343
Phantom Extended Wheelbase	2012–2017	6,749 cc (411.8 cu in) V12 (N73B67)	460 PS (338 kW; 454 hp)@5350, 720 N⋅m (531 lb⋅ft)@3500	343
Drophead Coupé	2012–2016	6,749 cc (411.8 cu in) V12 (N73B67)	460 PS (338 kW; 454 hp)@5350, 720 N⋅m (531 lb⋅ft)@3500	343
Coupé	2012–2016	6,749 cc (411.8 cu in) V12 (N73B67)	460 PS (338 kW; 454 hp)@5350, 720 N⋅m (531 lb⋅ft)@3500	343

=== Transmission ===
All models include ZF 8-speed automatic transmission.

== Special editions ==
=== Series I (2003–2012) ===
==== Centenary Edition (2004) ====
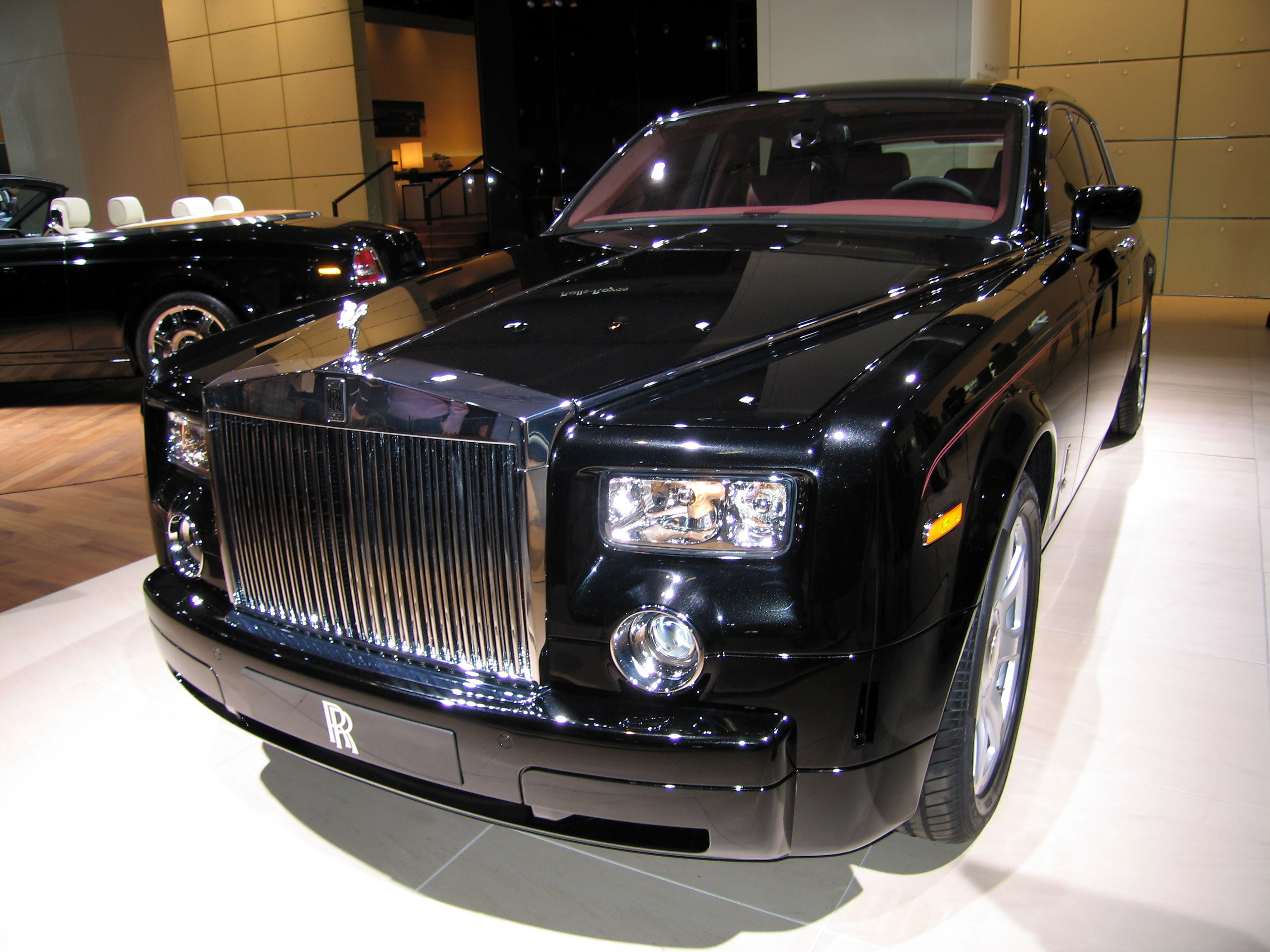
Rolls-Royce Phantom identical to the Centenary Edition (front view)

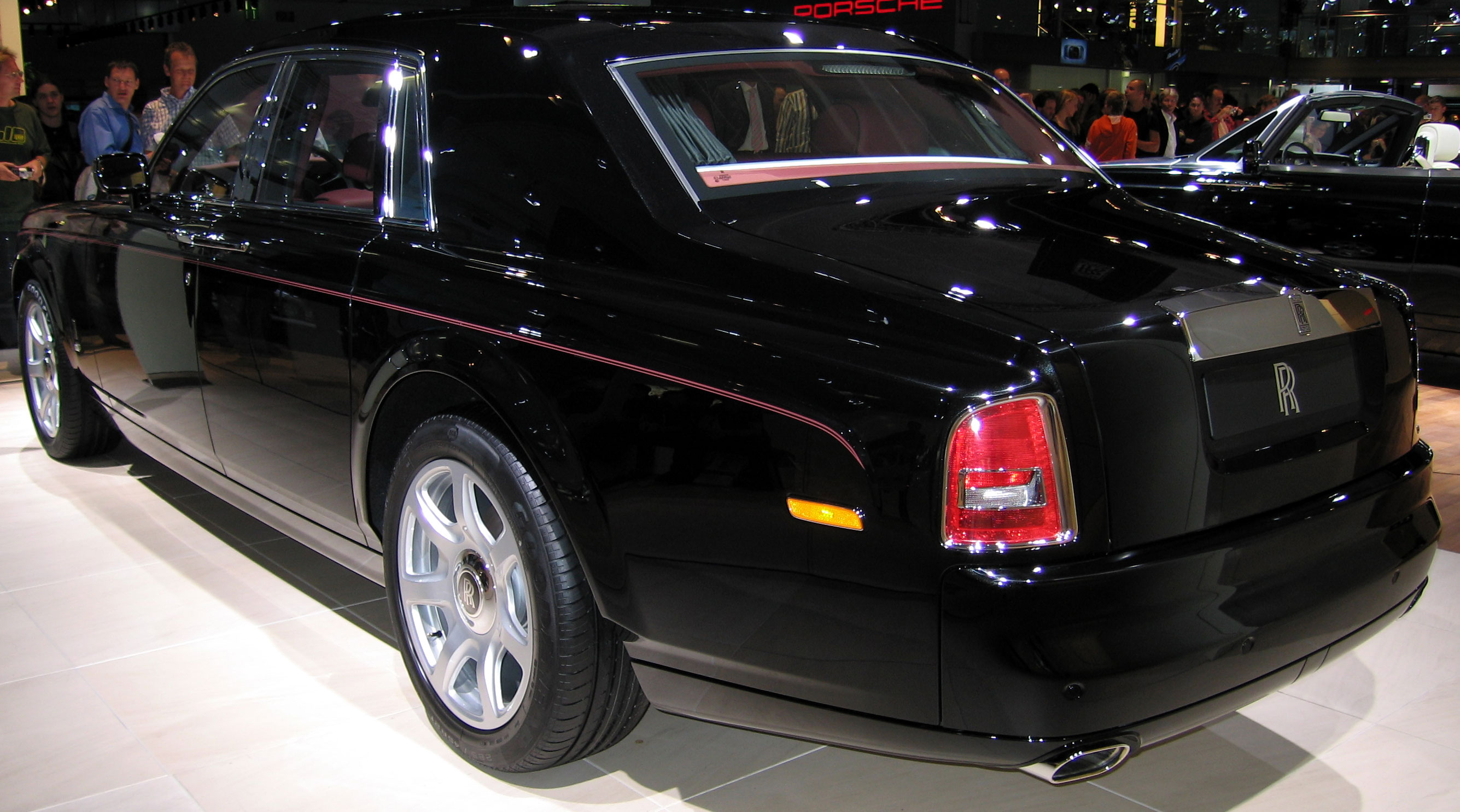
Rolls-Royce Phantom identical to the Centenary Edition (rear view)

In 2004, to celebrate the company's one-hundredth anniversary, Rolls-Royce introduced the "Phantom Centenary Edition". This model was limited to only 35 units worldwide and was specifically commissioned by Rolls-Royce. Most special edition cars are not commissioned by the factory, or are brought out to boost sales. This is not the case with the Centenary Edition. The car was debuted on 4 May 2004 at the Midland Hotel in Manchester. It was the meeting place of Charles Stewart Rolls and Frederick Henry Royce.

The Centenary Phantom can be distinguished from the standard car by several key features. All of the cars' "RR" emblems are red instead of black. This is reminiscent of the original Rolls-Royce cars that bore red badges for the first twenty-five years of the company until it was later changed due to customer requests. Each car is painted in a special "Dark Curzon" colour used only for the thirty-five Centenary cars and the 100 EX prototype, which was also debuted for the company's centenary celebration.

Exterior

- Solid sterling silver "Spirit of Ecstasy" bonnet mascot.
- Red "RR" badges throughout the car's exterior, instead of the standard black badges.
- The coach lines are red and match the red hand-painted rings around the wheel caps.
- The car is painted in "Dark Curzon", which is exclusive to the thirty-five cars.
- Wheel caps are painted in "Dark Curzon" to match the body.

Interior

- The instrumentation has a special anodised finish.
- Tread-plates with "C.S. Rolls & F.H. Royce 4 May 2004"
- Special chassis plate on the cars B-post
- The interior leather is in "Dark Curzon" to match the car's exterior.
- The glove box, when opened, has the car's number out of thirty-five.
- The interior woodwork is made of a Figured Mahogany veneer with a distinctive silver inlay.

==== Naples Winter Wine Festival car (2005) ====
It is a version of the Rolls-Royce Phantom built for the Naples Winter Wine Festival in Florida. It included a burgundy colour body, deep moccasin colour leather upholstery, cashmere headliner, cross-banded figured mahogany wood surfaces, sterling silver inlay on each of the mahogany-veneered door cappings, mini wine cellar at the floor of the boot, and a cigar humidor in the glove compartment.

The vehicle was unveiled at the 2005 Naples' Winter Wine Festival. It was sold at a charity auction in the US for $800,000.

==== 80th Anniversary Edition (2005) ====
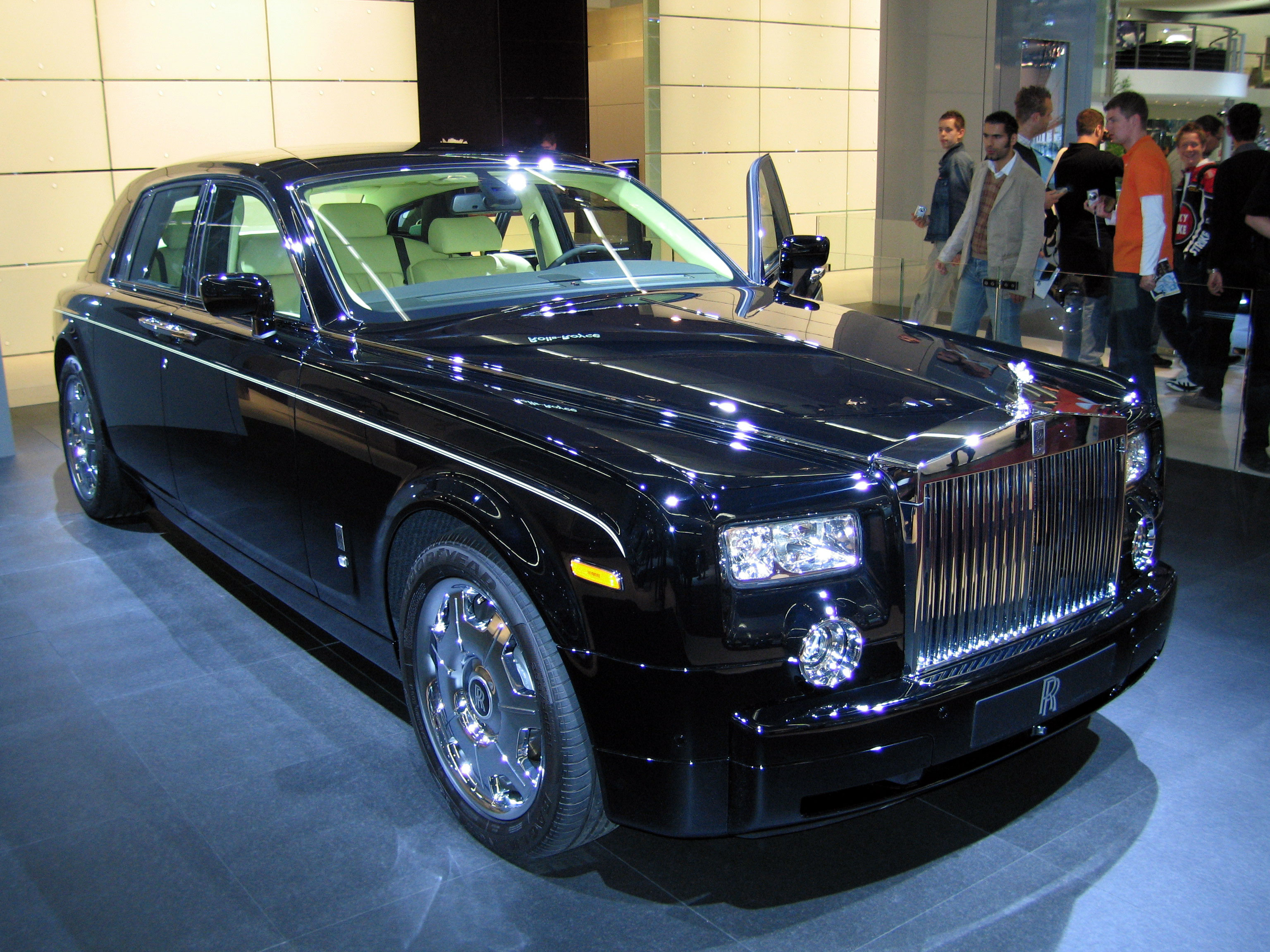
Rolls-Royce Phantom 80 th Anniversary Edition front view at the IAA, 2005

This was a limited run (25 units) of the Rolls-Royce Phantom commemorating the 80th anniversary of the Phantom name. It included a choice of 2 body colours (black, black and silver), silver hand-painted coach line, 21-inch aluminium wheels, black and seashell leather upholstery with contrast leather piping, a wine cooler below the rear seat, a DVD system, cross-banded burr walnut veneer at picnic tables, and Conway Stewart pen set (Duro style fountain pen, ballpoint and propelling pencil) fitted inside the glove box.

The vehicle was sold as €20,000 premium over Rolls-Royce Phantom.

==== Rolls-Royce Phantom Black (2006) ====
This was a limited run (25 units) of the Rolls-Royce Phantom with the following:

- Bespoke diamond black finish with twin silver coach lines
- 21-inch alloy wheels with black detailing and centre caps
- Visible tailpipes
- Gloss black inlet manifolds, with chrome plated top cover
- Black leather interior trim featuring seashell piping
- Black leather headlining with sunshine roof
- Black diamond metal foil instrument panel
- Black ash wood veneers with silver pinstripe
- Veneered picnic table backs
- Bespoke silver clock face
- Thicker rimmed steering wheel
- Lounge seat with a rear cool box
- Cast alloy chassis plate
- Phantom black embroidered glove box liner
- Nokia 8800 mobile phone
- Onboard television

==== Rolls-Royce Phantom Silver (2007) ====
This was a limited run (25 units) of the Rolls-Royce Phantom commemorating the 100th anniversary of the Rolls-Royce Silver Ghost. It included a Metallic Ghost Silver body colour, 21-inch wheels with chrome centres, solid silver Spirit of Ecstasy, Rose Leaf or Crème Light leather upholstery, seat piping and headrests embroidered with the Rolls-Royce interlinked RR badge, straight-grained Santos Palissander wood veneer, Coolbox, Santos Palissander veneer presentation box with key, two solid silver key fobs and a specially commissioned solid silver Conway Stewart fountain pen; bespoke drinks holder, white instrument dials, bespoke clock matched to instrument dials, Phantom Silver tread plates.

==== Rolls-Royce Phantom Tungsten (2007) ====
This is a special version of the Phantom customised by the Rolls-Royce Bespoke department. It included Xirallic Darkest Tungsten body colour, brushed aluminium bonnet, visible chrome-plated stainless steel exhaust pipes, Smoke Grey leather seats with contrasting Navy Blue, micro-engraved metal dashboard with high gloss straight-grained East Indian Rosewood veneer, and starlight headliner with 800 fibre-optic lights.

==== Grey Goose Extended Wheelbase Phantom (2007) ====
This was a limited run (two units) of the Rolls-Royce Extended Wheelbase Phantom customised by Grey Goose Vodka. It included blue body colour, the Grey Goose logo embroidered onto headrests and integrated into the trim of the car, grey chrome door tread plates, Grey Goose etched mirrors and sterling silver Grey Goose inlays on each of the mahogany-veneered door cappings.

==== Pininfarina Hyperion (2008) ====
This was a customised version of the Rolls-Royce Phantom Drophead Coupé built by Pininfarina.

The completed vehicle (with lengthened bonnet created by moving the windscreen back, bespoke headlights and removed back seats) was unveiled at the 2008 Pebble Beach Concours d'Elegance.

The Production version was originally reported to be sold as a series of body panels, but later the completed vehicle went on sale at an Abu Dhabi dealership for an undisclosed price.

==== Peony edition (2008) ====
This was a version of the Phantom created by the Rolls-Royce Bespoke Programme, for the United Arab Emirates market. It included two-tone pearl blue body color, Seashell interior upholstery with a peony floral motif, a complimentary bottle of perfume from Emirate fragrance specialist HIND.

==== Rolls-Royce Phantom Sapphire (2008) ====
This is a version of the Phantom with Milori Sapphire body color, navy blue leather upholstery with seashell highlights, walnut burr veneer inlaid with a diamond-pattern, a cool box below the rear seats in an aluminium billet receptacle, Rolls-Royce clock set with a diamond-shaped sapphire, Conway Stewart fountain pen set and solid silver key fobs in a lacquered walnut veneer box.

==== Middle East Phantom Bespoke Collection (2009) ====
In August 2009, a limited (6 units) Bespoke Collection model of the Phantom was introduced for the Middle East market. Features included: two-tone Arizona Sun and English White body colors; Crème Light and Saddle Tan natural grain leather upholstery; hand-knotted silk rugs; moccasin carpets; Mother-of-pearl inlays in the control knobs; and silver dhow-sailboat inlay in the door cappings and fascia panel.

==== Yas Eagle edition (2010) ====
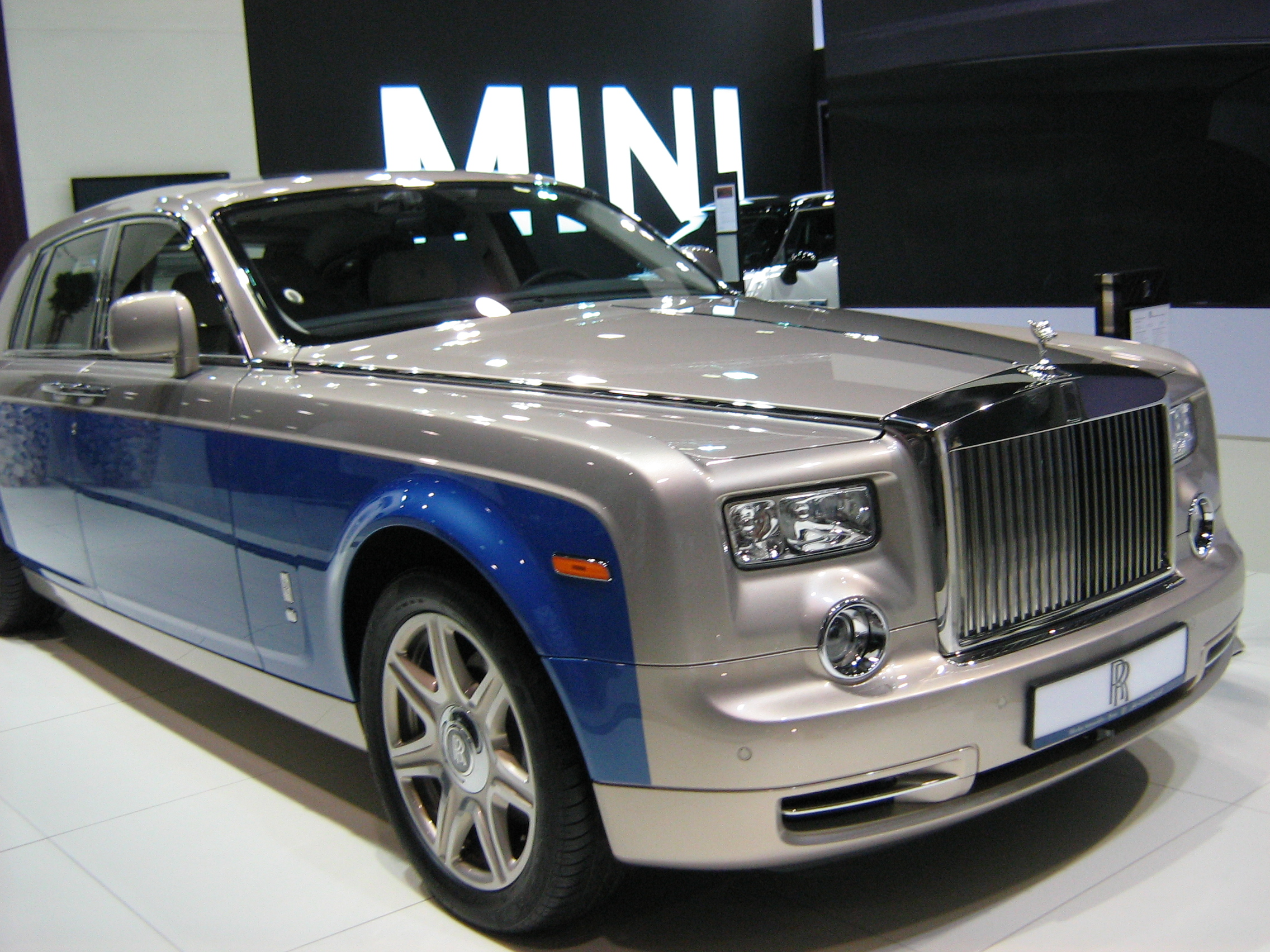
Rolls-Royce Phantom Yas Eagle Edition front view

This is a special version of the Rolls-Royce Phantom, Phantom Coupé, and Phantom Drophead Coupé for the Abu Dhabi market, built by Abu Dhabi Motors. It included Yas Eagle White and Yas Eagle Blue body colours, Cobalto Blue & Mugello Red interior upholstery, Fleet Blue stained ash veneer, instrument cluster in white dials, Cobalto Blue & Mugello Red instrument panel, Mugello Red steering wheel, Navy Blue boot trim and carpets, Navy Blue lambswool foot mats, checkerboard applied on the fascia, illuminated Spirit of Ecstasy, thicker steering wheel, RR logo on the headrests in Mugello Red, seat piping in Mugello Red, 21-inch forged Star alloy wheels, chrome-plated visible exhausts, and theatre-configuration lounge seat.

==== 60th Anniversary Special Edition Phantom Drophead Coupé (2010) ====
This was a version of the Phantom Drophead Coupé commemorating the 60th anniversary of the Pebble Beach Concours d'Elegance. It included a Stillwater Blue body colour, a navy blue soft top lined with cashmere, interior upholstered in a Crème Light leather, interior wood composed of cross-banded Santos Pallisander veneer contrasted with a silver pinstripe inlay, oiled teak decking at roof tonneau and in luggage compartment flooring, a fully fitted champagne service set with crystal flutes, teak-covered picnic deck, a refrigerated cabinet concealed beneath the luggage compartment floor, an enamelled plaque on the dash, Concours logos on the tread plates and embroidery on each seat.

The vehicle was unveiled at the 2010 Pebble Beach Concours d'Elegance.

==== 2010 Paris Motor Show Phantom (2010) ====
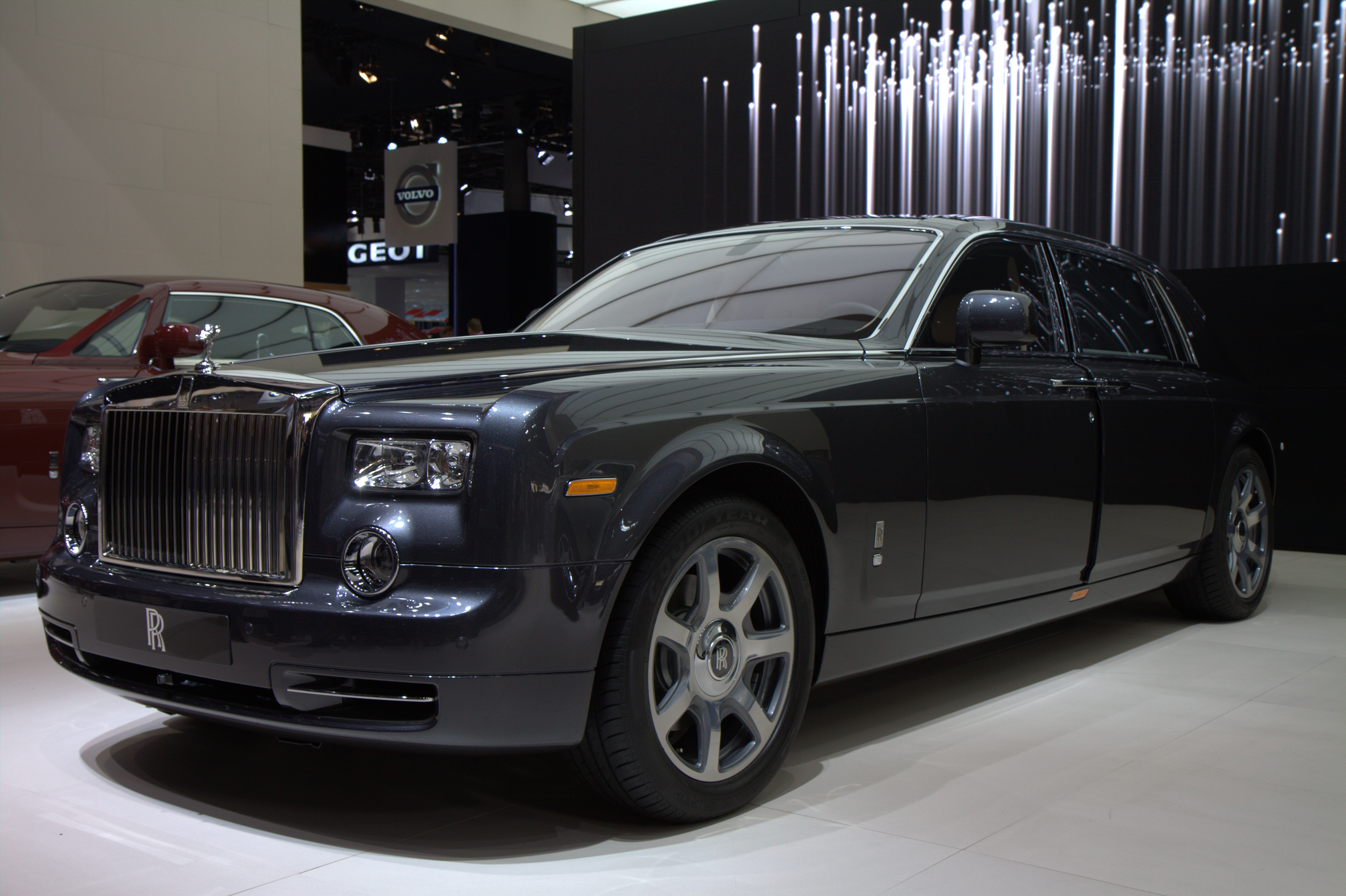
Rolls-Royce Phantom EWB Paris Motor Show Edition front view at the 2010 Paris - Mondial de l'automobile

Three models were revealed at the 2010 Paris Motor Show, these were the Extended Wheelbase, Drophead Coupé, and the Coupé. During the event, Rolls-Royce highlighted the Phantom line’s handcrafted interiors and bespoke detailing, with several cars finished in unique colour and trim combinations created for the Paris showcase.

==== Spirit of Ecstasy Centenary Collection (2011–present) ====
This is a limited run (100 units) of the Phantom commemorating the 100th anniversary of Spirit of Ecstasy. It included silver Spirit of Ecstasy ornament with black-gold plated bezel bearing the commemorative inscription 'Spirit of Ecstasy Centenary – 2011', Rolls-Royce twin coachline, an analogue clock fitted in the fascia panel with Britannia Silver outer bezel, satin spun metal dials with polished RR monograms and polished chaplets and black numerals, choice of 4 body colours (Rhapsody Black (black with gold sparkle), Maiden Blue (deep blue metallic highlighted with a silver sparkle), Ethereal White Pearl (with a special pearlescent finish), Wildflower (a blend of red and brown colour with a fine sparkle)), handcrafted banding of Britannia Silver at veneer inset, a desk ornament featuring a polished steel Spirit of Ecstasy mounted on the piano black base, individual certificates of authenticity signed by Rolls-Royce Motor Cars CEO Torsten Müller-Ötvös.

==== Phantom Experimental Electric (102EX) (2011) ====
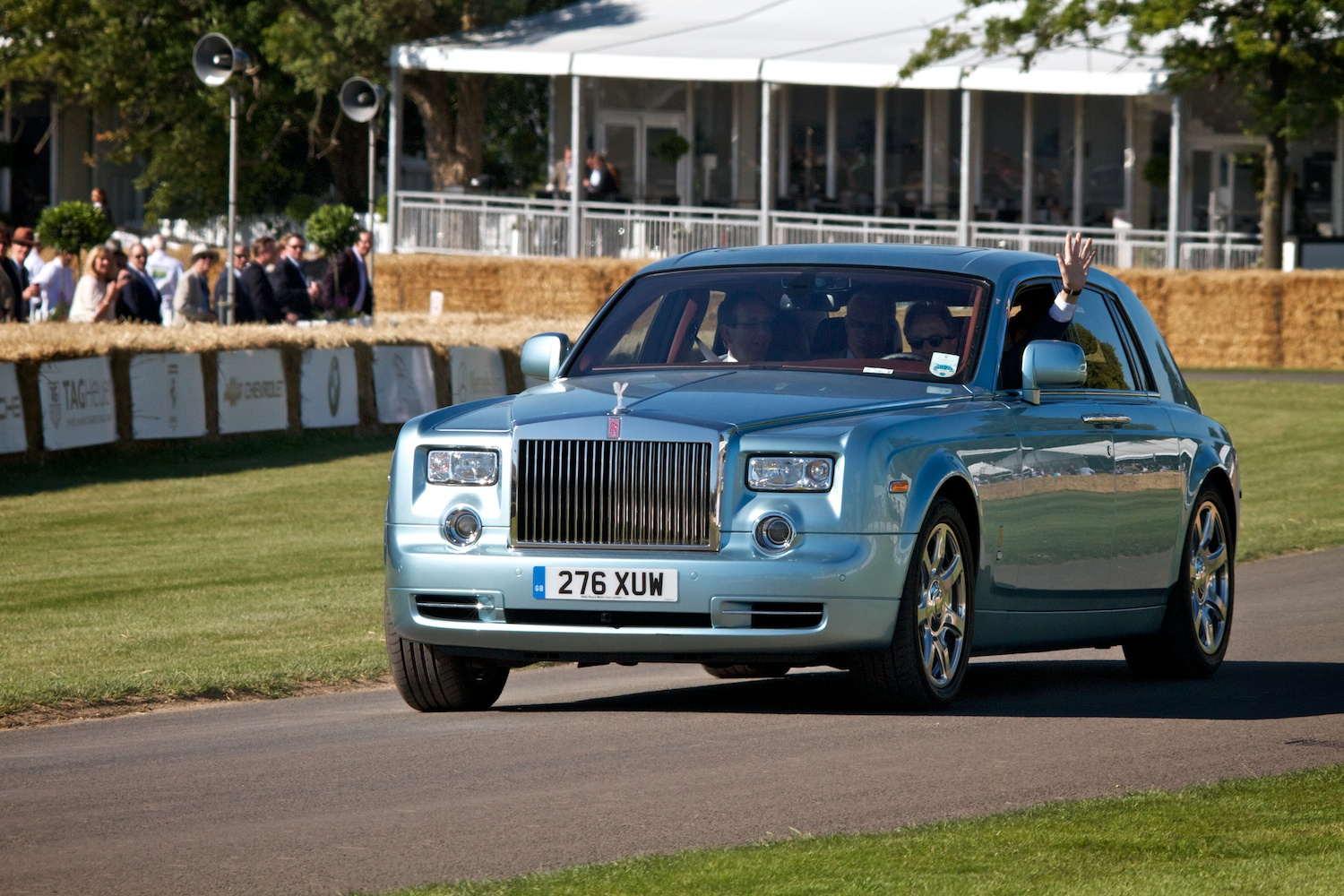
Rolls-Royce 102EX at the Goodwood Festival of Speed

This is one-off battery electric vehicle version of the Rolls-Royce Phantom with two electric motors mounted on the rear sub-frame rated at 290 kW (394 PS; 389 hp) and 800 N⋅m (590 lb⋅ft), 1-speed transmission with integrated differential, paint using ceramic nano particles with four layers of Atlantic Chrome paint coats, red double-R badge, Spirit of Ecstasy in Makrolon illuminated in blue LED light, Atlantic chrome-finished dashboard dials, recharging plug and five-pin socket, window frames with rear-mounted tricolour LEDs showing car's charging status, interior wood veneers, leather interior derived from a natural vegetable tanning process christened Corinova, chestnut colour for seat covers and Quebracho Brown for other areas such as the floor and boot lining (both made of durable saddle leather), aluminised foil weave at interior panels, 850 A 338 V Lithium-Nickel-Cobalt-Manganese-Oxide battery pack with 71 kilowatt hour capacity, separate charger units (3 kW each) are fitted to the battery, induction charging unit. The electric propulsion systems was from UQM PowerPhase by UQM Technologies, Inc. Electric drivetrain integration was performed by Lotus Engineering.

The vehicle was unveiled at the 2011 Geneva Motor Show.

==== Masterpiece London 2011 Drophead Coupé (2011) ====
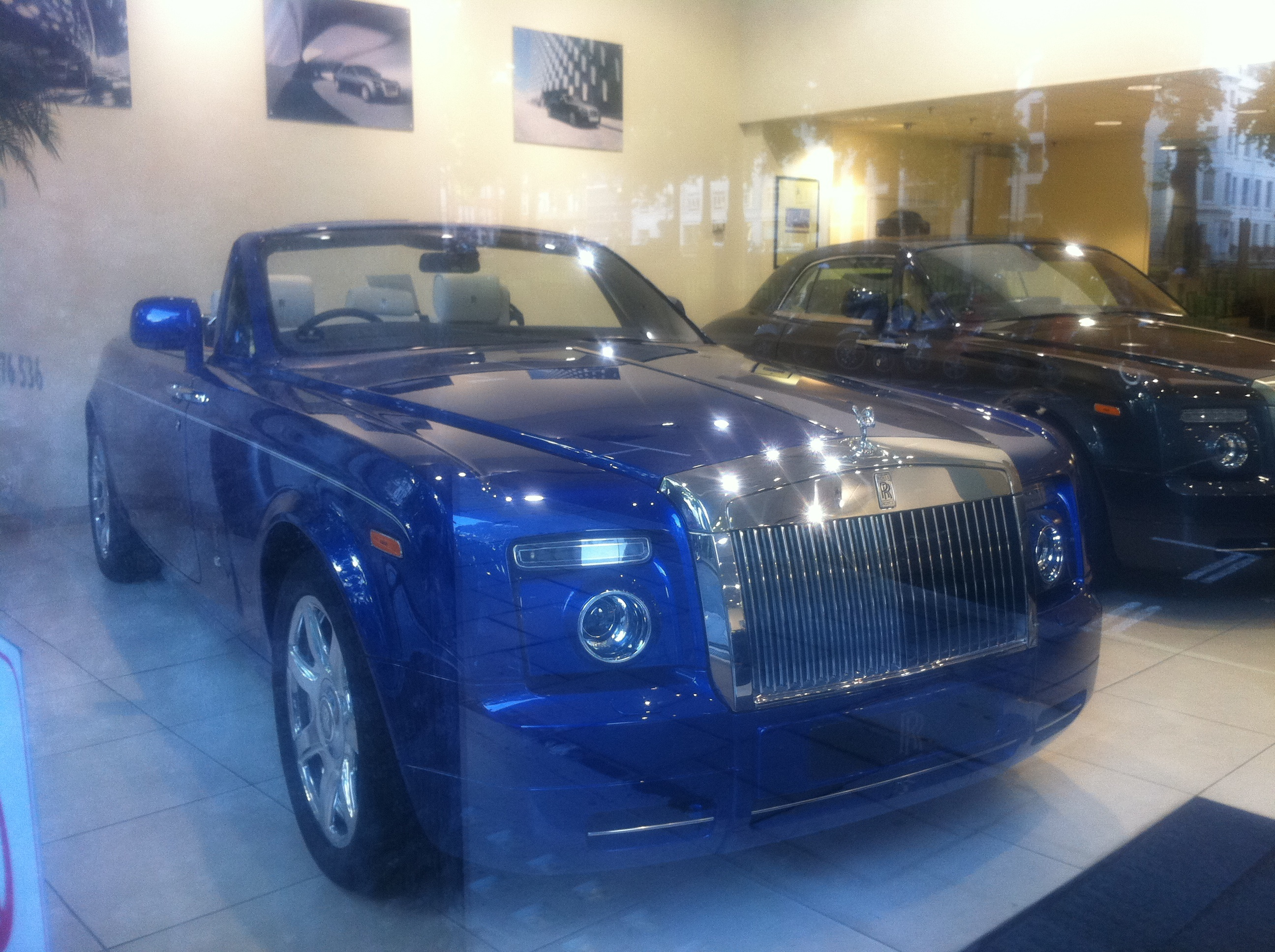
Rolls-Royce Phantom Drophead Masterpiece London Edition front view

This is a version of the Drophead Coupé with Asprey jewellery box (with grade-one suede hide) in the glove compartment, bespoke teak decking, engraved tread plates, Spirit of Ecstasy; Mazarine Blue body colour (inspired by the Mazarine blue butterfly), natural-grain leather interior in Seashell with Navy Blue contrast at floor and door panels, yacht-inspired teak decking with mother-of-pearl inlays at cross-banded Santos Palissander wood veneers, white instrument dials, rotary controllers and clock in mother-of-pearl, bespoke leather-upholstered luggage in the picnic boot.

The vehicle was unveiled at Masterpiece London 2011.

==== Year of the Dragon Collection (2011) ====
This is a version of the 2012 model year Phantom and Phantom Extended Wheelbase inspired by the Chinese dragon, designed at the home of Rolls-Royce by the Bespoke team, for the Chinese market. It included a twin gold coachline on each side of the car body, a dragon on leather headrest embroidered in Tan, Golden Sand, Black and White threads; dragon inlay at the passenger panel with the Phantom model name in gold, two hand-stitched cushions for the rear passengers, specified with embroidered double R-R logos and piping; illuminated treadplates with 'Year of the Dragon 2012' highlighted in LED lighting, modern or traditional marquetry.

==== Phantom Coupé Aviator Collection (2012) ====
This is a limited run (35 units) of the Phantom Coupé, inspired by Supermarine S6B (powered by a Rolls-Royce R Type engine). It included an Aviator Grey body color, a contrasting matt bonnet, window and grille surround, Thommen aviation-grade clock with blood orange needle tips embedded in the metal foil upper fascia and matt black dials, mahogany lower fascia with Sapele contrast, polished stainless steel veneer 'onlays' with bullet-shaped ends, leather-lined glove compartment, centre console chrome plaque describing Charles Rolls, polished aluminium cup holders.

The vehicle was unveiled at the Pebble Beach Quail.

=== Series II (2012–2018) ===
==== 2012 London Olympics Phantom Drophead Coupé (2012) ====
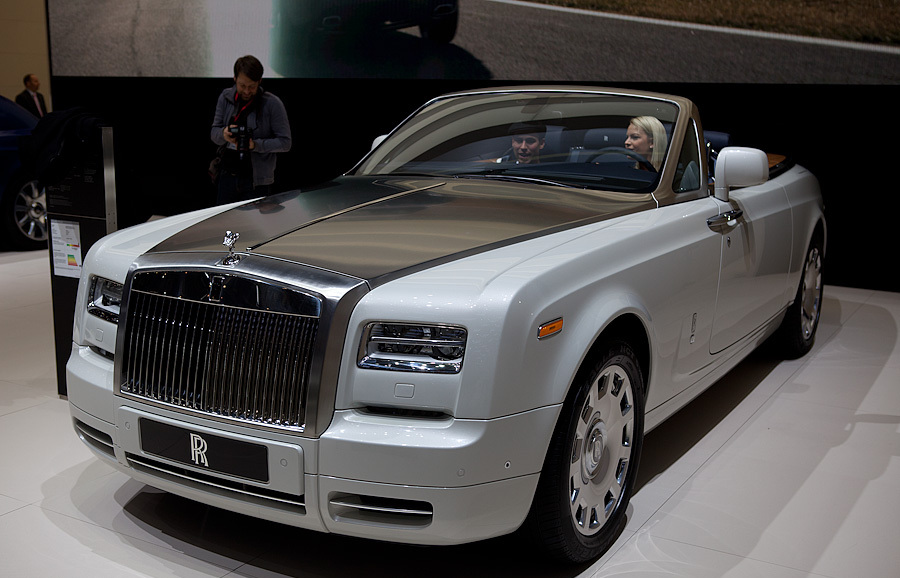
A Phantom Drophead Coupe identical to the Olympic Edition at the 2012 Geneva Motor Show

This was a limited run (three units) special version of the Phantom Series II Drophead Coupé built for the Closing Ceremony of 2012 Summer Olympics. It included an English White body color, a new grille badge featuring the Spirit of Ecstasy with the Union Flag replacing the traditional flowing gown, a steering wheel centre with a traditional laurel wreath and torch, and self-righting wheel centres featuring the words 'London 2012' surrounded by the Olympic motto, 'Citius, Altius, Fortius' ('Faster, Higher, Stronger'); tread plates identify each car as 'One of Three'.

The vehicles were unveiled at the 2012 London Olympics closing ceremony.

==== Phantom Art Deco cars (2012–present) ====
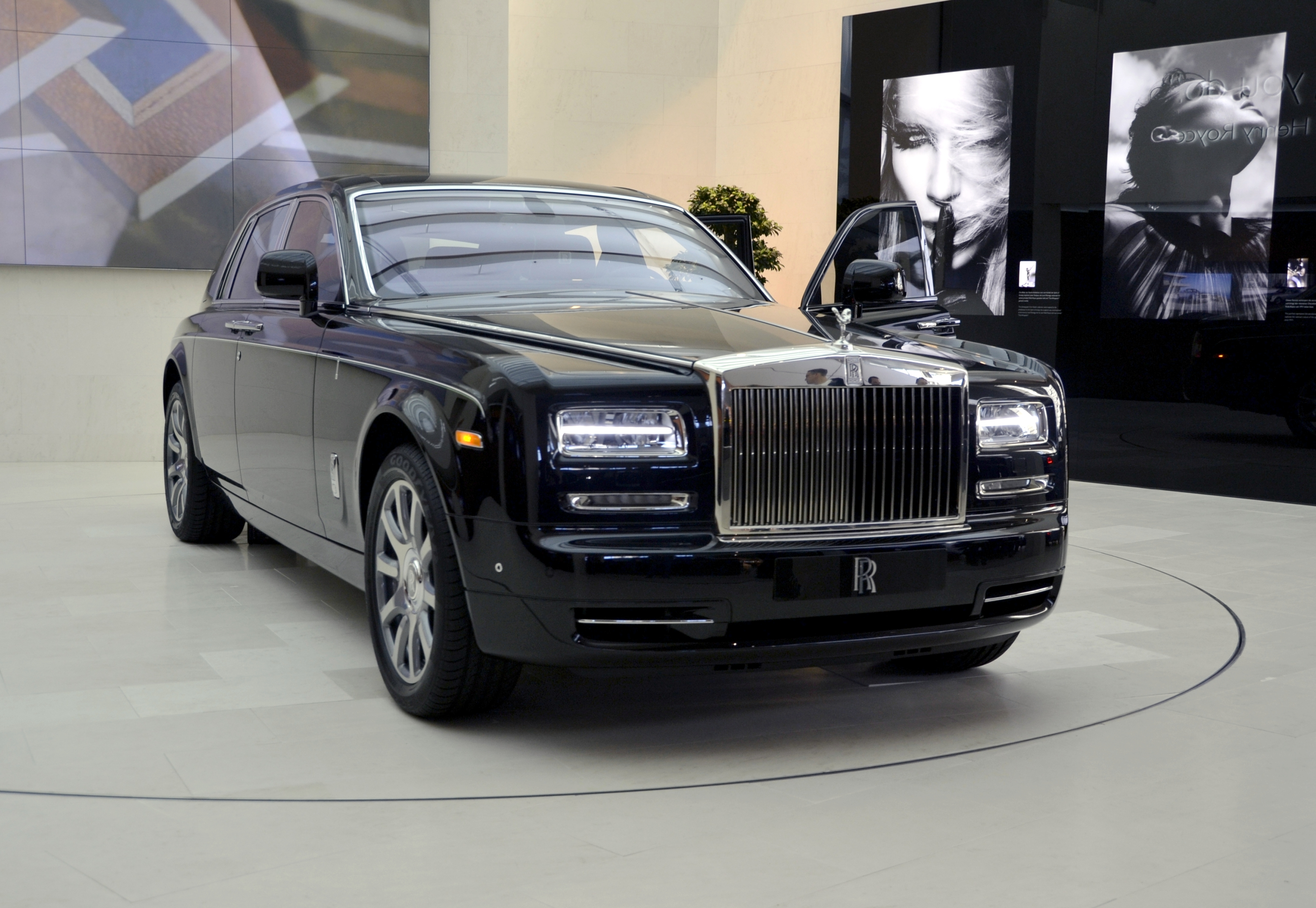
Rolls-Royce Phantom Art Deco front view

The Art Deco cars are versions of the Phantom inspired by the Art Deco era.

Retail models include a choice of 4 body colours (Infinity Black, Arabian Blue, Powder Blue or Arctic White) with twin coachline with an Art Deco motif, illuminated Spirit of Ecstasy, Art Deco headrest embroidery, bespoke inlays on piano black veneer, tread plates with Art Deco motif.

Bespoke models of the Phantom Saloon (with Black and Arctic White interior) and Phantom Drophead Coupé (with mother-of-pearl inlays) were unveiled at the 2012 Paris Motor Show.

==== Home of Rolls-Royce Collection Phantom (2013–present) ====
They are versions of the Phantom conceived and designed by the Rolls-Royce Bespoke team, commemorating 10 years of production at the Home of Rolls-Royce in Goodwood, England.

The first vehicle, a Phantom Series II saloon, was unveiled at Quail, a Motorsports Gathering.

==== Celestial Phantom (2013) ====
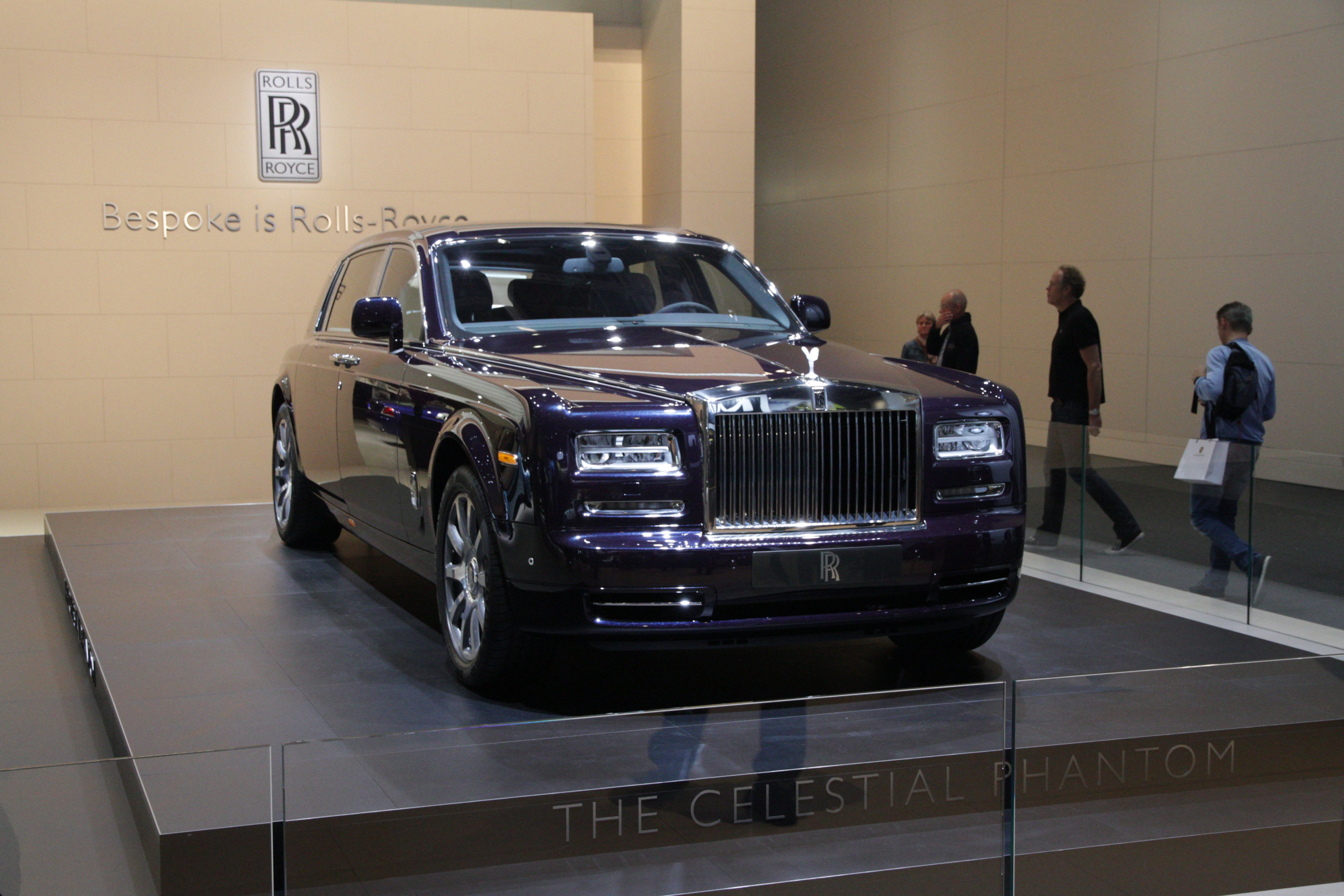
Celestial Phantom

It is a version of the Phantom Extended Wheelbase with a night sky-inspired body color scheme with fine glass particles paint. The Starlight Headliner contains LEDs in a night-sky constellation arrangement which encapsulates the night sky above Goodwood on 1 January 2003 - the date the Phantom was released. It was verified by the South Downs Planetarium. It includes dusk hue leather upholstery, rear privacy dividers, a clock with four diamonds, engraving to the wheel centres, an uplit Spirit of Ecstasy figurine, and a Rolls-Royce Picnic Set (glassware with hand-engraved Celestial motif, plates by porcelain maker Nymphenburg).

The vehicle was unveiled at the 2013 Frankfurt IAA.

==== Chicane Phantom Coupé (2013) ====
It is a version of the Phantom Coupé inspired by Goodwood Motor Circuit's motorsport history, with carbon fibre veneer, bonnet and windscreen surround in matte black, Gunmetal body colour, coloured wheels matching body colour, chequered flag motif stitching to the seats, a metal plaque expressing the car's name, Goodwood's famous track layout in the glove compartment.

==== Pinnacle Travel Phantom (2014–2017) ====
It is a version of the Phantom with a two-tone exterior color scheme of Madeira Red complemented by Silver Sand on the lower side panels (optional Infinity Black combined with Silver Haze or Melanite combined with Palladium schemes), Madeira Red coach line, Morello Red and Seashell leather combinations for seats, roofliner, pillars and door cards; Morello Red lambs wool floor mats, Smoke Grey thread.

The vehicle was unveiled at the 2014 Beijing Motor Show.

==== Rolls-Royce Phantom Drophead Coupé Waterspeed Collection (2014) ====
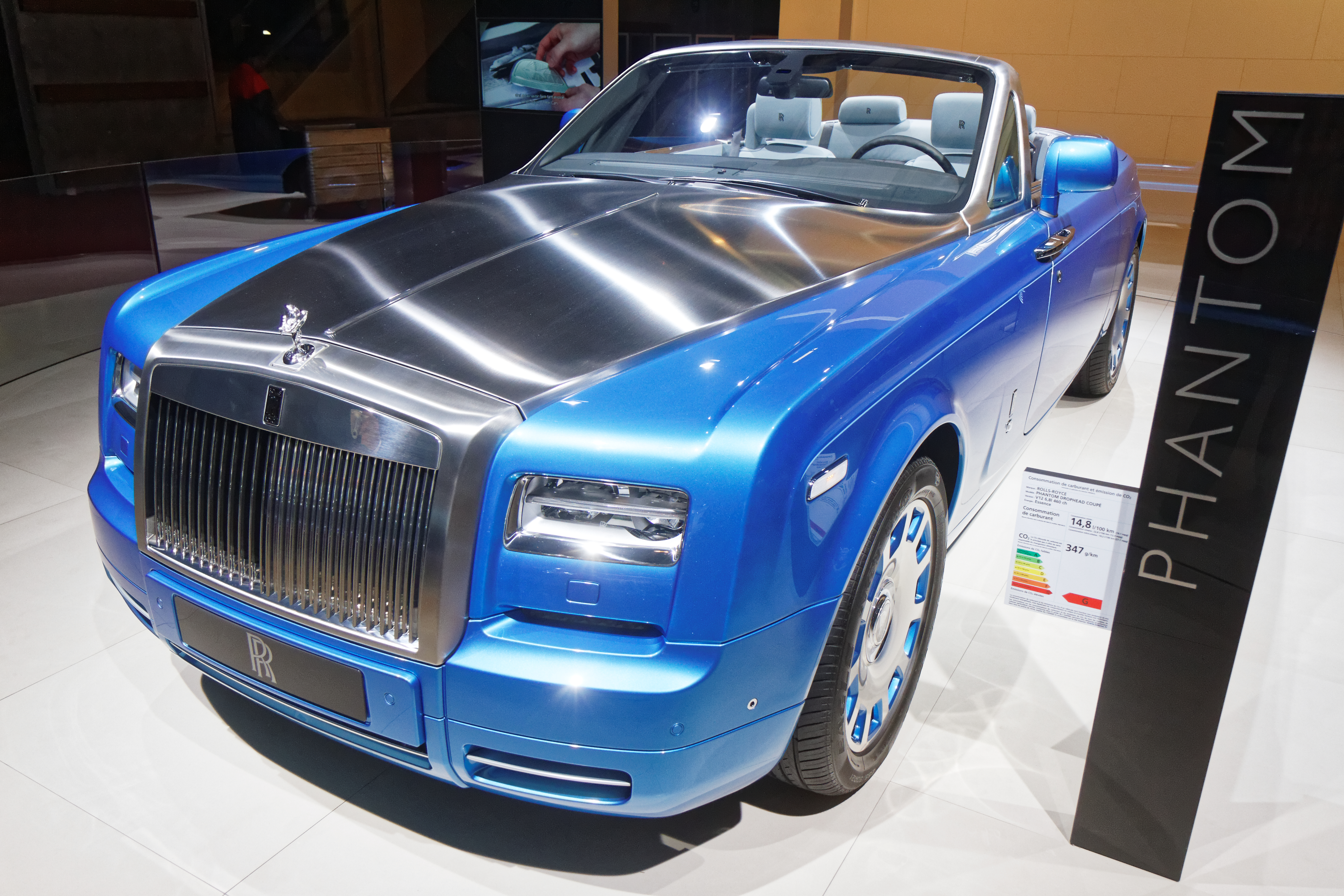
Rolls-Royce Phantom Drophead coupe Water speed edition front view

It is a limited (35 units) version of the Rolls-Royce Phantom Drophead Coupé celebrating Sir Malcolm Campbell breaking the water-speed record with Bluebird K3 hydroplane boat (powered by Rolls-Royce R37 engine), with Maggiore Blue body colour, 21-inch alloy wheels with blue highlights, Bluebird logo redesigned by the Bespoke team at Goodwood at coachline in contrasting blue, Maggiore Blue interior colour, two-tone steering wheel in blue leather, two-tone piping on the seats, dashboard top, cup holder surround and door accents; blue accents on power reserve gauge, brushed steel bonnet, windscreen A-frame, cockpit surround and rear deck; aluminium dashboard fascia, laser-etched door armrest cappings, aluminium transmission tunnel and centre console, 'Windchill Grey' leather upholstery, polished aluminium cup holders, bookmatched Abachi wood veneer beneath the fascia on the dashboard, steel rear decking, clock with infinity sign from Campbell's K3 and K4, all four of Campbell's water-speed records de-bossed in the leather lining inside glove compartment lid, laser-engraved Bluebird motifs in the armrests of Waterspeed in single billet aluminium.

The vehicle was unveiled in Bluebird Restaurant, followed by the 2014 Concorso D'Eleganza at Villa D'Este.

==== Phantom Metropolitan Collection (2014) ====
It is a limited (20 units) version of the Phantom inspired by the modern metropolis. It included leather upholstery in Aetherius Grey, 6,800 two-tone stitches depicting an abstract image of a skyscraper at the central rear seat, a rotating bezel expressing 24 of the great cities of the world and their time zones (including Paris) at the central console, Darkest Tungsten body colour

The vehicle was unveiled at the 2014 Paris Motor Show.

==== Rolls-Royce Maharaja Phantom Drophead Coupé (2014) ====
It is a version of the Rolls-Royce Phantom Drophead Coupé with Carrara White body colour, a Peacock emblem at Emerald green coachline, a Deep Green hood, a deck with a Peacock emblem integrated into the marquetry, Crème Light leather upholstery with Emerald green accents, marquetry inlay on the facia panel top and armrests, Peacock emblems embroidered into the headrests in Emerald green and Cobalto blue, a Peacock feather pattern in Seashell stitching on the side and central armrests, Bespoke Maharaja Peacock clock with Cobalto blue and Jade elements.

The vehicle was unveiled in the AGMC Rolls-Royce showroom.

==== Phantom Suhail Collection (2014) ====
It is a version of the Phantom with Moonstone Pearl body colour, Suhail star emblem at Turchese Blue coachline, Cremé Light leather upholstery with Turchese accents, a Navy Blue instrument panel top and carpets, Suhail star emblems at the marquetry on the Ash Burr wood fascia, a Starlight Headliner, Bespoke clock colour-matched to the interior depicts the Suhail Ursa Minor and Major constellation on the clock face.

==== Al-Adiyat Phantom Coupé (2015) ====
It is a version of the Phantom Coupé inspired by a horse. It included a racing red body color, a single white coachline that depicts the reins worn by a racehorse, Tudor barrel oak veneers and stainless steel inlays on the rear coach doors, hand-embroidered motifs of galloping horses at front headrests, gold-plated horseshoes feature in the sill plates and clocks.

==== Phantom Serenity (2015) ====
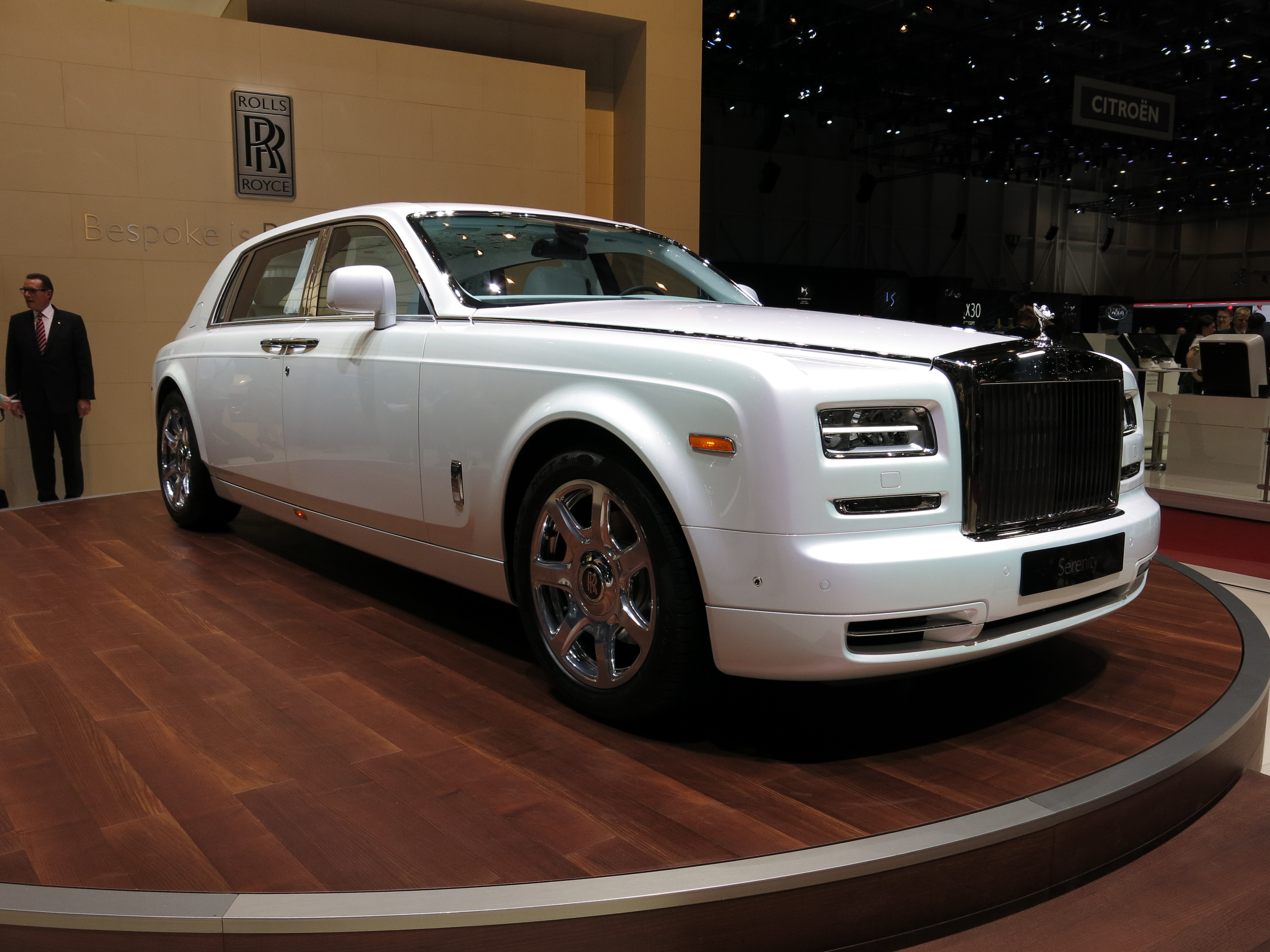
Rolls-Royce Phantom Serenity (Series II)

It is a version of the Phantom with silk interior upholstery in Smoke Green with painted crimson petals, Arctic White leather upholstery at the front seats, Smoked Cherrywood and Bamboo veneers at door cappings, dash fascia and rear centre console; petal marquetry in Mother of Pearl on the rear door cappings, Mother of Pearl marquetry at the clock and driver's instrument dials, Mother of Pearl clock face etched with concentric circle and inlaid with hand-applied rubies, luggage compartment lined in Arctic White leather with an Arctic White carpet, two parasols in Serenity motif held by Bespoke leather loops at boot lid, Bespoke Mother of Pearl body colour, two colour coachline with three colour blossom motif applied by Mark Court.

The vehicle was unveiled at the 2015 Geneva Motor Show.

==== Rolls-Royce Phantom Limelight (2015) ====
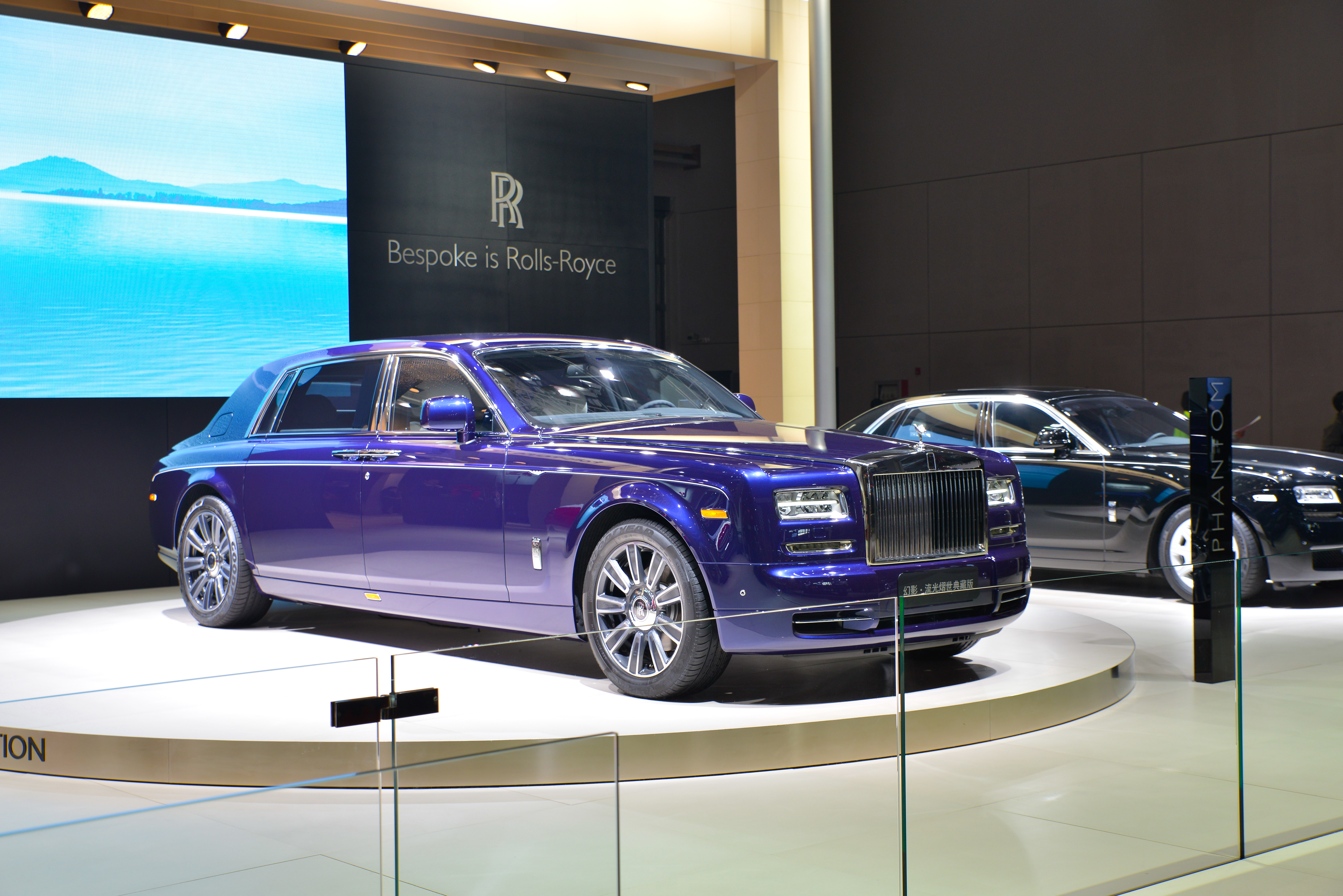
Rolls-Royce Phantom Limelight Edition

The Phantom Limelight (流光熠世•幻影典藏版) is a limited (25 units) version of the Phantom aimed at high-profile people such as celebrities, famous business people and royalty. It included Concealed Fragrance Holder for three individual fragrances is located in the top left pocket of the Ladies' pannier, watches holder at the concealed section of Gentlemen's pannier, top right pocket with fragrance bottles in the Gentlemen's pannier and 2 watch or jewellery holders at Ladies' pannier, buyer-specified fragrance bottles, universal vanity pouch at bottom left pocket, Ladies' and Gentleman's Accessory Z-Boxes at door pannier, seat back reclines by 27°, calf rest raises electrically by 68°, foot rest raising feet up to 30°, choice of two compartment trims, Light (Seashell with Navy Blue Contrast Leather and Seashell tone-on-tone stitching) or Dark (Navy Blue with Seashell Contrast Leather and Navy tone-on-tone stitching) contrast scheme, a diamond shape embroidery at central seat flutes, door cards, rear console, Picnic Table backs; two-veneer finish with Piano Seashell at door cappings and Smoked Chestnut veneer, a Limelight Bespoke Clock in Gala Blue paint exterior with diamond motif design.

The vehicle was unveiled at the 2015 Shanghai Motor Show.

==== Phantom Coupé Tiger (2015) ====
It is a version of the Phantom Coupé with two-tone Burnt Orange and Arizona Sun body colours, a Tiger motif twin coachline, Tan and Seashell leather upholstery with hand-stitched embroidered Tiger motif headrests, Moccasin Lambswool floor mats, Maccasser Ebony Veneers and Bespoke Tiger Phantom Coupé treadplates.

The vehicle was unveiled at the 2015 Dubai International Motor Show.

==== Phantom Zenith Collection (2016) ====
It is a limited (50 units) version of the Phantom Drophead Coupé and Phantom Coupé with a glass shelf at the rear section of the tailgate, a champagne fridge at boot, padded leathers seats at rear-tailgate, Bespoke version of the Rolls-Royce Picnic Hamper (Piano Black folding picnic tables, leather and wood interior shelving, lead crystal wine glasses, stainless steel cutlery, napkins embroidered with the Rolls-Royce monogram in Arctic White, a handcrafted American Walnut chopping board, crockery, hamper painted black and platinum detail around the edges), laser etching to the armrest cappings, a removable polished aluminium case engraved with the motor car's unique identification number, speedometer in brushed steel, Starlight Headliner with individually hand-woven stars clustered to the front and faded to the rear, Madeira Red and Jubilee Silver (Phantom Coupé) or Midnight Blue and Arctic White colour schemes, glass clearcoat at body paint, Blood-Orange tips to the instrument dials, cupholders machined from aluminium.

The Zenith Drophead Coupé was unveiled at the 2016 Concorso d'Eleganza Villa d'Este in Italy.

== Production and sales ==
Phantom (7th gen.) Production figures
Version/Year	2003	2004	2005	2006	2007	2008	2009	2010	2011	2012	2013	2014	2015	2016	2017	Total
Manufactured	502	875	692	847	1029	1417	-	-	-	-	-	-	-	-	-	-
Delivered (all versions)	300	792	796	805	1010	1212	835	537	818	789	854	602	488	389	100	10,327
Phantom inc EWB	300	792	796	805	757	644	376	351	537	573	631	-	-	-	-	-
Coupé inc Drophead	-	-	-	-	253	568	459	186	281	216	223	-	-	-	-	-

Manufacture figures from 2009 include other models and from 2014 no longer separate the different versions of the Phantom VII.

- Total production of all variants of the Phantom VII, extended wheelbase (EWB), Coupe, and Drophead Coupe between 2003 and 2017 was 10,327 units.
- The introductory base price was £250,000 in the United Kingdom and $300,000 in the United States.
- After selling 805 units in 2006, Rolls-Royce first met its annual sales target of 1,000 vehicles in 2007 (1,010 Phantoms sold, including 253 (25%) Drophead Coupé sales).
- 2008 production of the Phantom peaked at 1212 units, including 137 (11%) Coupe and 431 (35%) Drophead Coupe. 2009 showed 198 (23%) coupe and 261 (31%) Drophead Coupe.
- In 2004, Rolls-Royce was selling twice as many cars as its closest rival Maybach.
- The 2,000th car rolled out of the Goodwood factory in December 2005.
- The 3,000th car rolled out of the Goodwood factory in March 2007.
- The Peninsula Hotel in Hong Kong has purchased a fleet of 14 extended wheelbase Phantoms to replace the Silver Spurs in the fleet, all painted in a special "Peninsula Green" and delivered in December 2006, making history for being the largest single order for the Phantom.
- The first 5 Phantom Drophead Coupé convertibles were completed on 2007-07-20.
- O'Gara Coach Company of Beverly Hills, California, sold 58 Phantoms and Drophead Coupes in 2007, accounting for 15% of Rolls-Royce sales in the US and 6% worldwide.
- The initial production of 200 2008 Phantom Coupe was sold out during its original announcement in 2008, with two-thirds of the orders come from customers who had never before owned a Rolls-Royce vehicle.
- As of 27 January 2012, Year of the Dragon editions of Phantom and Phantom Extended Wheelbase were sold out.
- Five Phantom Series II Extended Wheelbase cars were ordered by Sands China Ltd. in the first quarter of 2013, while retaining options to expand its fleet in the near future.
- The first of 30 Bespoke Phantom Series II Extended Wheelbase vehicles built for THE 13 hotel in Macau was transferred during the 2016 Geneva International Motor Show.
- On 23 February 2016, Rolls-Royce Motor Cars Chief Executive Officer Torsten Mueller-Oetvoes announced entering the last stage of Phantom production in 2016, with the production of seventh-generation limousines ending in the same year. The Coupe and Convertible will be discontinued from the line-up. 50 Zenith models of the Coupe and Convertible will be produced. The company will produce a Phantom successor that will come out in 2018, which was announced to be based on all-new aluminium architecture.
- The production of Phantom Coupé and Drophead Coupé at Goodwood was set to end in November 2016, without future renewal.

At the end of January 2017 production of the Phantom ended.
