= Hongqi E-HS9 =

Battery electric full-size luxury crossover SUV

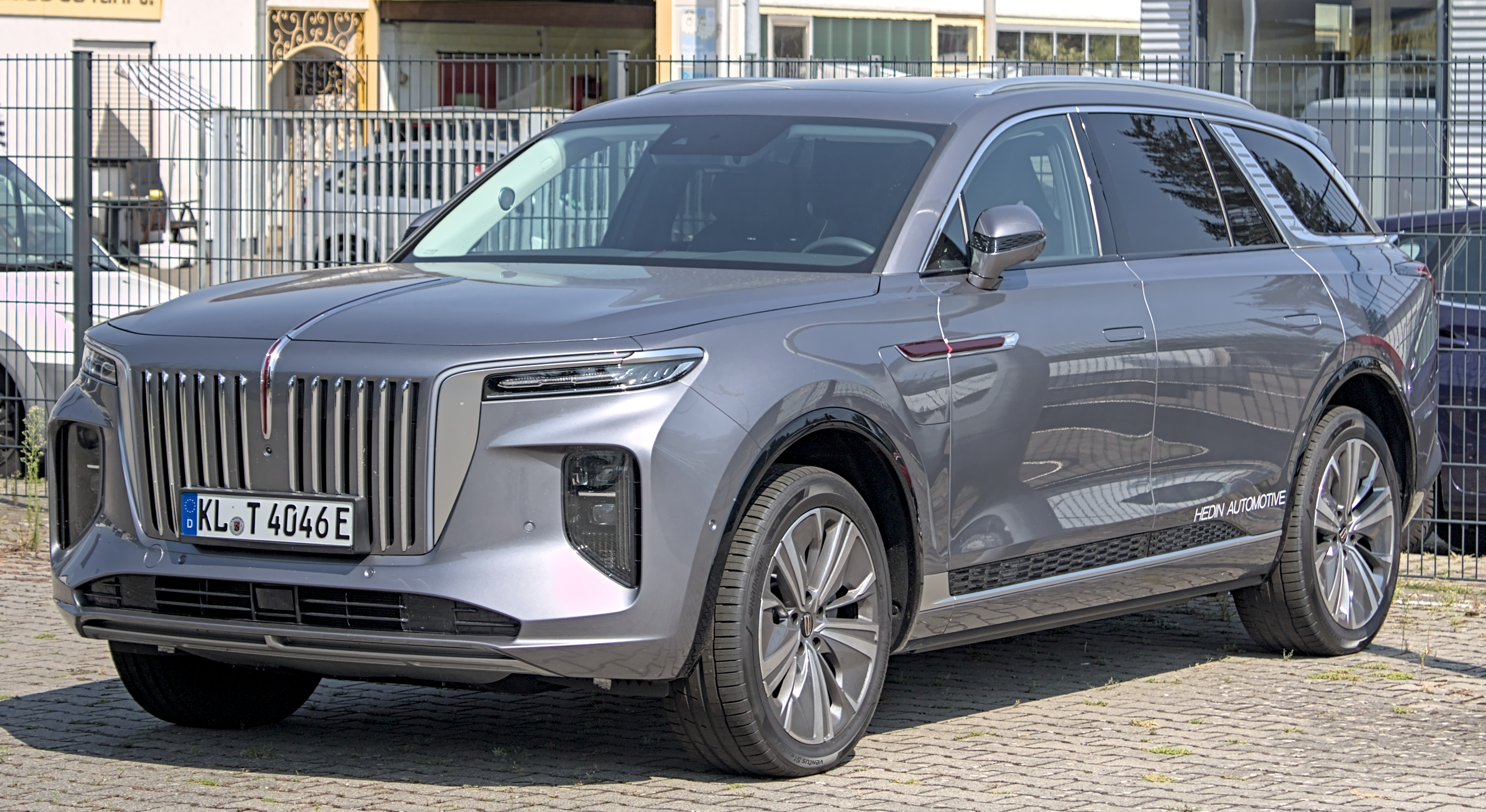

Overview
- Manufacturer: Hongqi (FAW Group)
- Production: 2020–present
- Assembly: China: Changchun, Jilin
- Designer: Yangfeng Ding; Giles Taylor (Production)

Body and chassis
- Class: Full-size luxury crossover SUV
- Body style: 5-door SUV
- Layout: Dual-motor, all-wheel-drive

Powertrain
- Electric motor: 2× Permanent magnet synchronous
- Power output: 321–405 kW (436–551 PS; 430–543 hp) (total)
- Battery: 84–120 kWh CATL lithium ion (NMC)
- Range: Maximum 760 km (472 mi) (CLTC); Maximum 645 km (401 mi) (NEDC); Maximum 548 km (341 mi) (WLTP)

Dimensions
- Wheelbase: 3,110 mm (122.4 in)
- Length: 5,209 mm (205.1 in)
- Width: 2,010 mm (79.1 in)
- Height: 1,731 mm (68.1 in)
- Curb weight: 2,700 kg (6,000 lb)

The Hongqi E-HS9 (Chinese: 红旗E-HS9) is a battery electric full-size luxury crossover SUV produced by Chinese automobile manufacturer Hongqi, a subsidiary of FAW Group.

== Overview ==
The production Hongqi E-HS9 is a 5-door, 7 seat vehicle.

== Powertrain ==
The E-HS9 is available in two different performance variants. The lower-spec model features one electric motor for each axle rated at 215 hp (160 kW; 218 PS) each, with 430 hp (321 kW; 436 PS) combined. The top-trim model features a 329 hp (245 kW; 334 PS) motor for the rear axle, with a combined power of 544 hp (406 kW; 552 PS). According to specifications, top of the range model accelerates 0 to 60 mph (0 to 97 km/h) within 5 seconds.

== Technology ==
The Hongqi E-HS9 is equipped with an intelligent sensor steering wheel and six smart screens, capable of functions such as AR real scene navigation and remote vehicle control by mobile phone, including unlocking, temperature regulation, smart voice control, and vehicle locating.

== Battery and charging ==
The E-HS9 has a 92.5-kilowatt-hour battery unit with 108 kW CCS-plug. The car supports wireless charging technology or non-contact charging and can fully charge the vehicle in 8.4 hours with charging efficiency of up to 91%. In terms of endurance, the NEDC range of Hongqi E-HS9 can reach up to 510 km (320 mi). Both the range and charging speed are significantly lower in cold temperatures.

== Safety ==
Euro NCAP test results Hongqi E-HS9 Deluxe (LHD) (2025)
Test	Points	%
Overall:	5 /5 stars	
Adult occupant:	33.1	82%
Child occupant:	43	87%
Pedestrian:	46.5	73%
Safety assist:	14.9	82%

== Design ==
=== Concept car ===
Originally previewed by the Hongqi E115 Concept during the 2019 International Motor Show Germany (IAA) and 2019 Guangzhou Auto Show, the production Hongqi E-HS9 was first shown at the 2020 Beijing Auto Show.

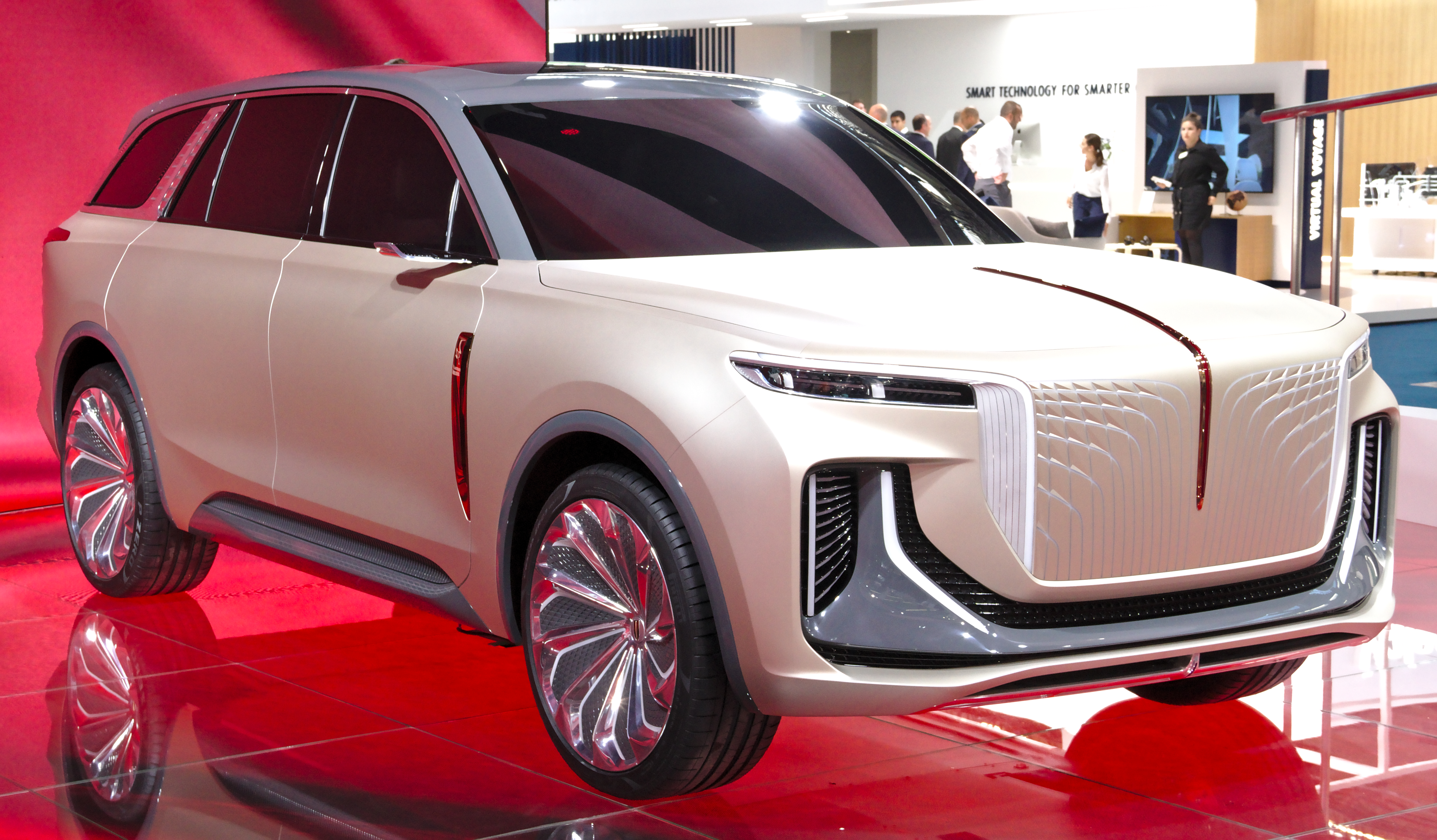
Hongqi E115 Concept at IAA 2019

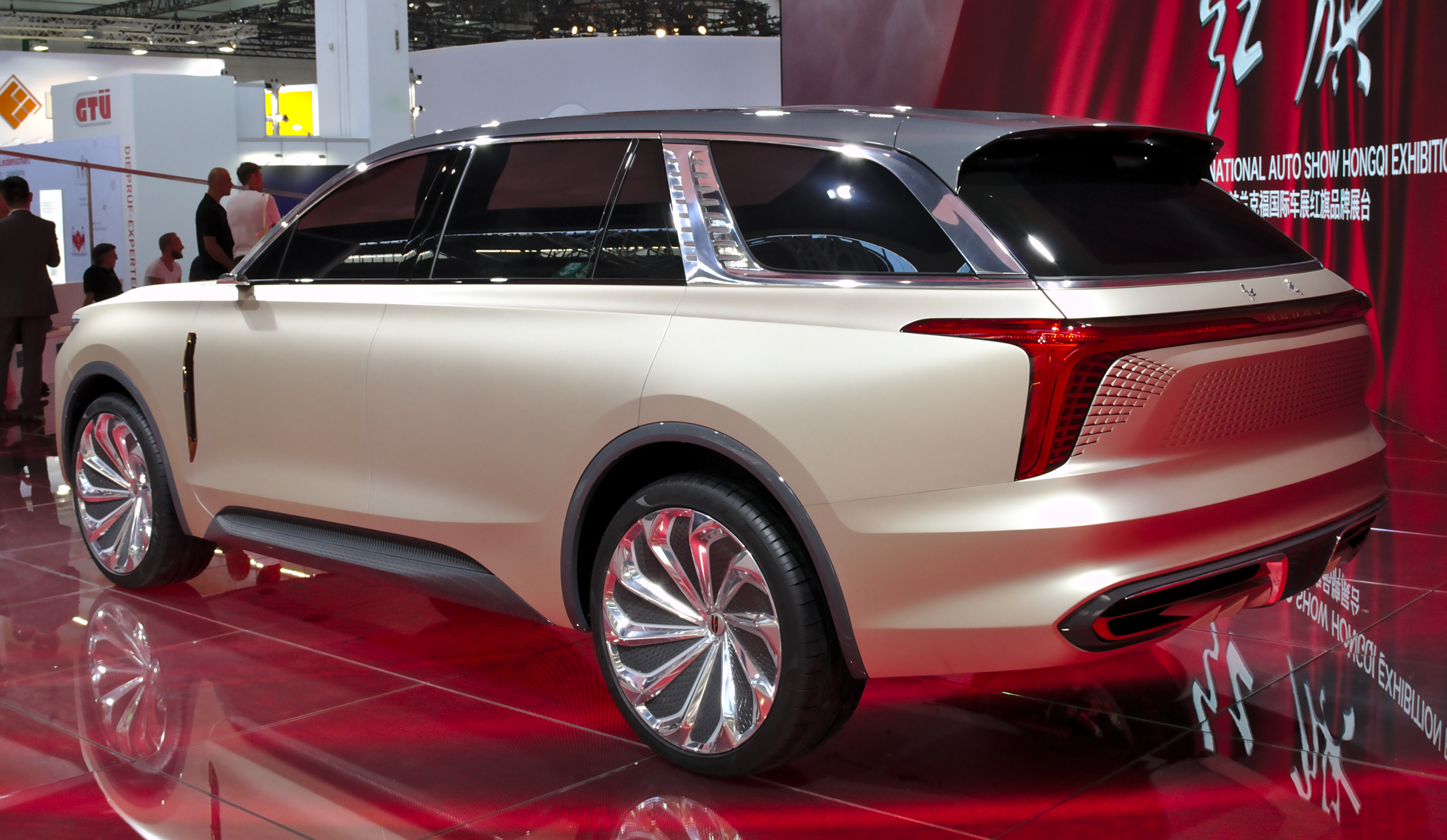
Rear view

=== Production vehicle ===
The E-HS9 features a dual-colour design and comes with 22-inch wheels. It has a dimensions of 5209 mm/2010 mm/1731 mm, with a 3110 mm wheelbase. The weight is 2,700 kilograms (6,000 lb), and the drag coefficient $c_\mathrm{d}$ is 0.345.

Design of Hongqi E-HS9 has generally been well received and often compared to Rolls-Royce Cullinan by the automotive press. Both cars were designed by Giles Taylor.

== Right-Hand Drive ==
The facelifted Hongqi E-HS9 was introduced to right-hand-drive (RHD) markets in 2026 as part of Hongqi's global expansion strategy. Compared with the original model, the updated E-HS9 features a redesigned interior with revised ergonomic elements, a retuned air suspension system, and an updated battery pack supplied by CATL.

Singapore became the first right-hand-drive market to launch the facelifted E-HS9. The model made its public debut at the Singapore Motorshow 2026 through distributor Eurokars Group before customer deliveries commenced later that year.

The Singapore launch formed part of FAW Hongqi's broader overseas expansion into right-hand-drive markets. At Auto Shanghai 2026, the company announced plans to introduce the E-HS9 and other models to Singapore, Thailand, Indonesia and Hong Kong, with Australia, Malaysia and the United Kingdom identified as subsequent expansion markets.

Following its launch in Singapore, the facelifted E-HS9 was introduced in Thailand in June 2026 through distributor Metro Group, marking Hongqi's entry into the Thai premium electric vehicle market.
