= Land yacht =

Land yacht or Landyacht may refer to:

- Land sailing, also known as land yachting
- Land yacht (automobile) a class of automobile
