= Rolls-Royce Phantom VIII =

Ultra-luxury flagship automobile in its eighth generation

Rolls-Royce Phantom
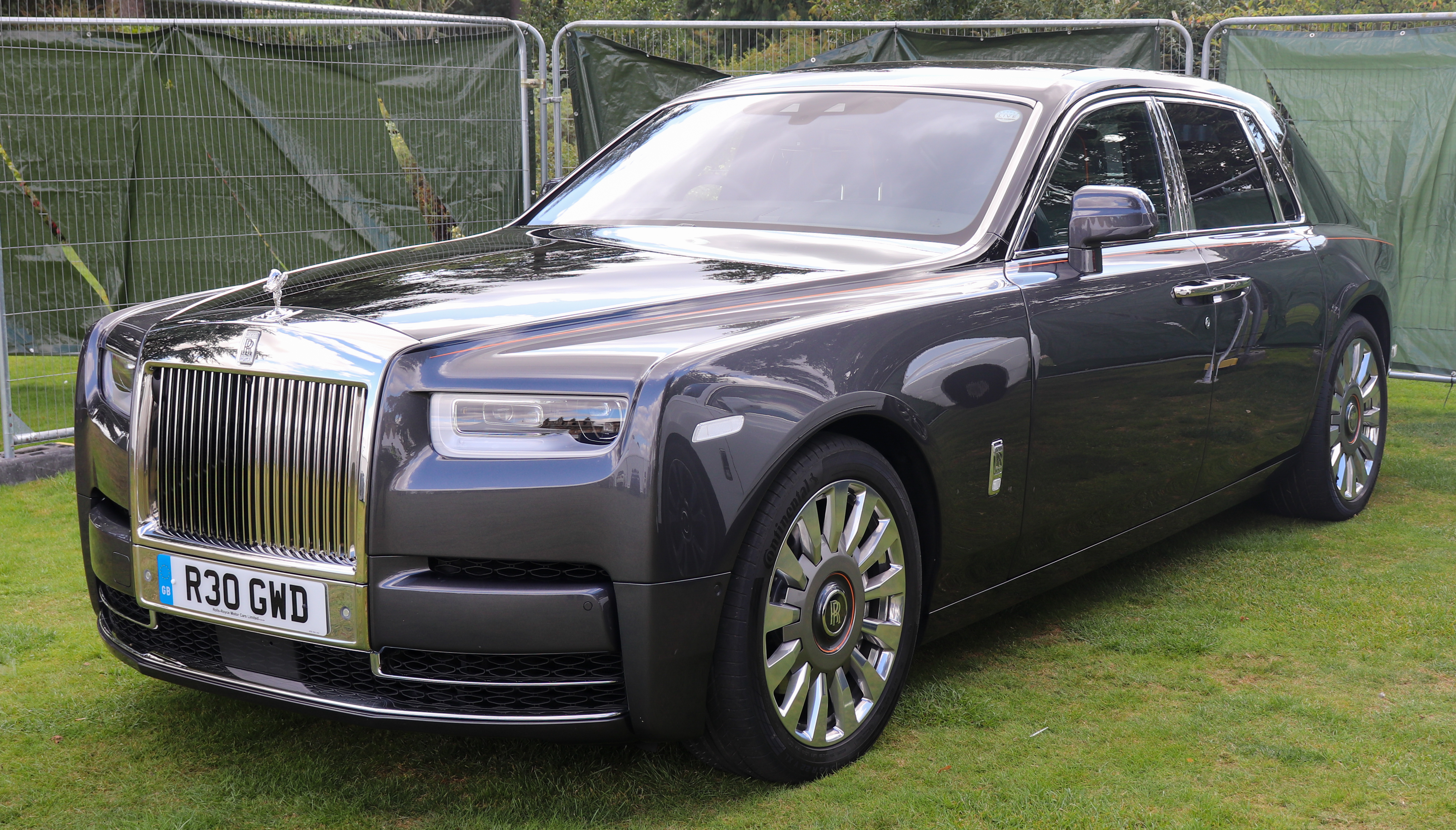

Overview
- Manufacturer: Rolls-Royce Motor Cars
- Production: 2017–present
- Assembly: United Kingdom: West Sussex, England (Goodwood plant)
- Designer: Giles Taylor; Pavle Trpinac; Chris Duff (interior)

Body and chassis
- Class: Full-size luxury car (F); Ultra-luxury car
- Body style: 4-door saloon
- Layout: FR layout
- Platform: Architecture of Luxury
- Doors: Conventional doors (front)/Coach doors (rear)
- Related: Rolls-Royce Cullinan; Rolls-Royce Ghost; Rolls-Royce Boat Tail; Rolls-Royce Spectre; Rolls-Royce Silent Shadow

Powertrain
- Engine: 6.75 L N74B68 twin-turbo V12 (petrol)
- Transmission: 8-speed 8HP automatic

Dimensions
- Wheelbase: 3,552 mm (139.8 in) (SWB); 3,772 mm (148.5 in) (EWB)
- Length: 5,762 mm (226.9 in) (SWB); 5,982 mm (235.5 in) (EWB)
- Width: 2,018 mm (79.4 in)
- Height: 1,646 mm (64.8 in) (SWB); 1,656 mm (65.2 in) (EWB)
- Kerb weight: 2,560 kg (5,643.8 lb) (SWB); 2,610 kg (5,754.1 lb) (EWB)

Chronology
- Predecessor: Rolls-Royce Phantom VII

The Rolls-Royce Phantom is a full-sized luxury saloon manufactured by Rolls-Royce Motor Cars. It is the eighth and current generation of the Rolls-Royce Phantom, debuting in 2017, and the second launched by Rolls-Royce under BMW ownership. This is the current flagship model made by Rolls-Royce Motor Cars, and is offered in two wheelbase lengths.

== Launch ==
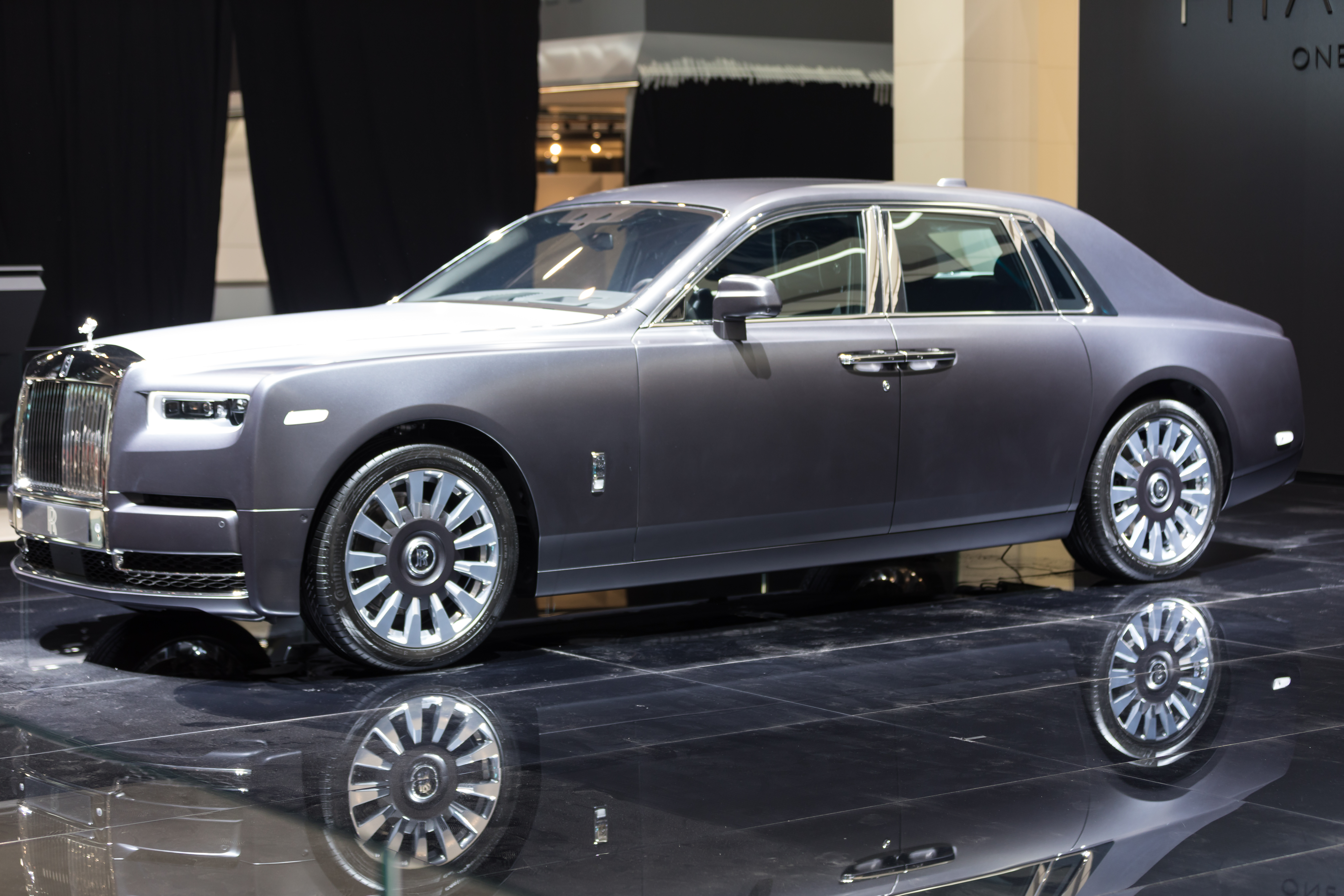
Rolls-Royce Phantom VIII front left view at the 2018 Geneva Motor Show

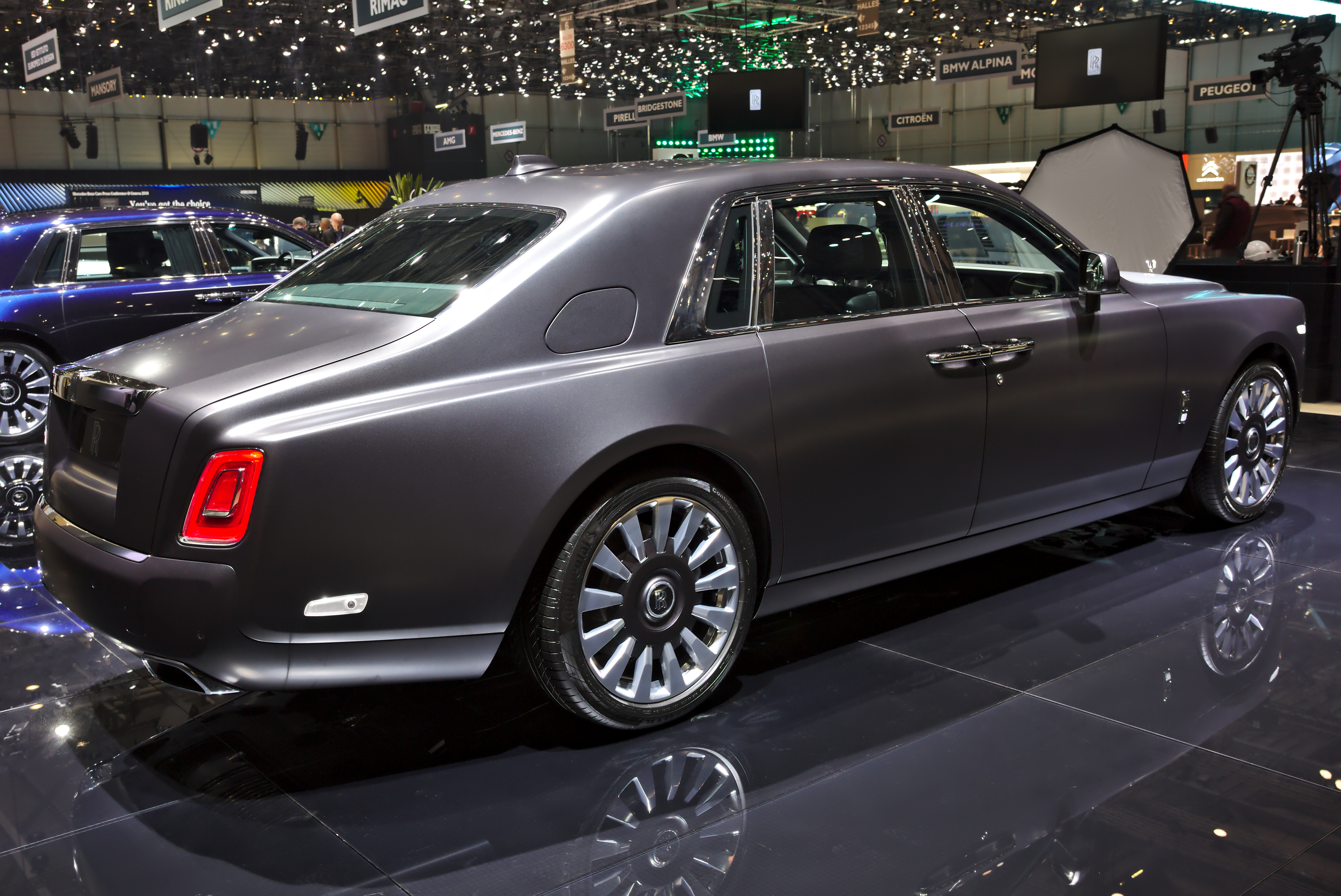
Phantom VIII right rear, 2018 Geneva Motor Show

The Phantom was unveiled by livestream on 27 July 2017.

It made its public debut at a special exhibition Rolls-Royce held in London two days later on 29 July. The event, dubbed "The Great Eight Phantoms", took place at Bonhams auction house in Mayfair. The exhibition gathered a noteworthy Phantom from each generation, from Fred Astaire's Phantom I to subsequent models driven by royalty, or made famous by celebrities, including John Lennon's Romany gypsy wagon-style painted Phantom V; John Lennon's psychedelic Rolls-Royce.

== Design ==
The Phantom VIII's styling has been described as an evolution of the Phantom VII's as it bears most of the design features of its predecessor.

Like its predecessor, the Phantom VIII has a short front overhang and upright front end, a long bonnet and set-back passenger compartment as well as a long wheelbase and a flowing rear end. It also uses rear-hinged "coach doors". For the first time on a Phantom, Rolls-Royce's trademark "Parthenon" radiator grille is integrated into the surrounding bodywork.

The Phantom is available in two wheelbase lengths. The shorter of the two is the shortest Phantom since at least 1939.

== Phantom Extended Wheelbase ==
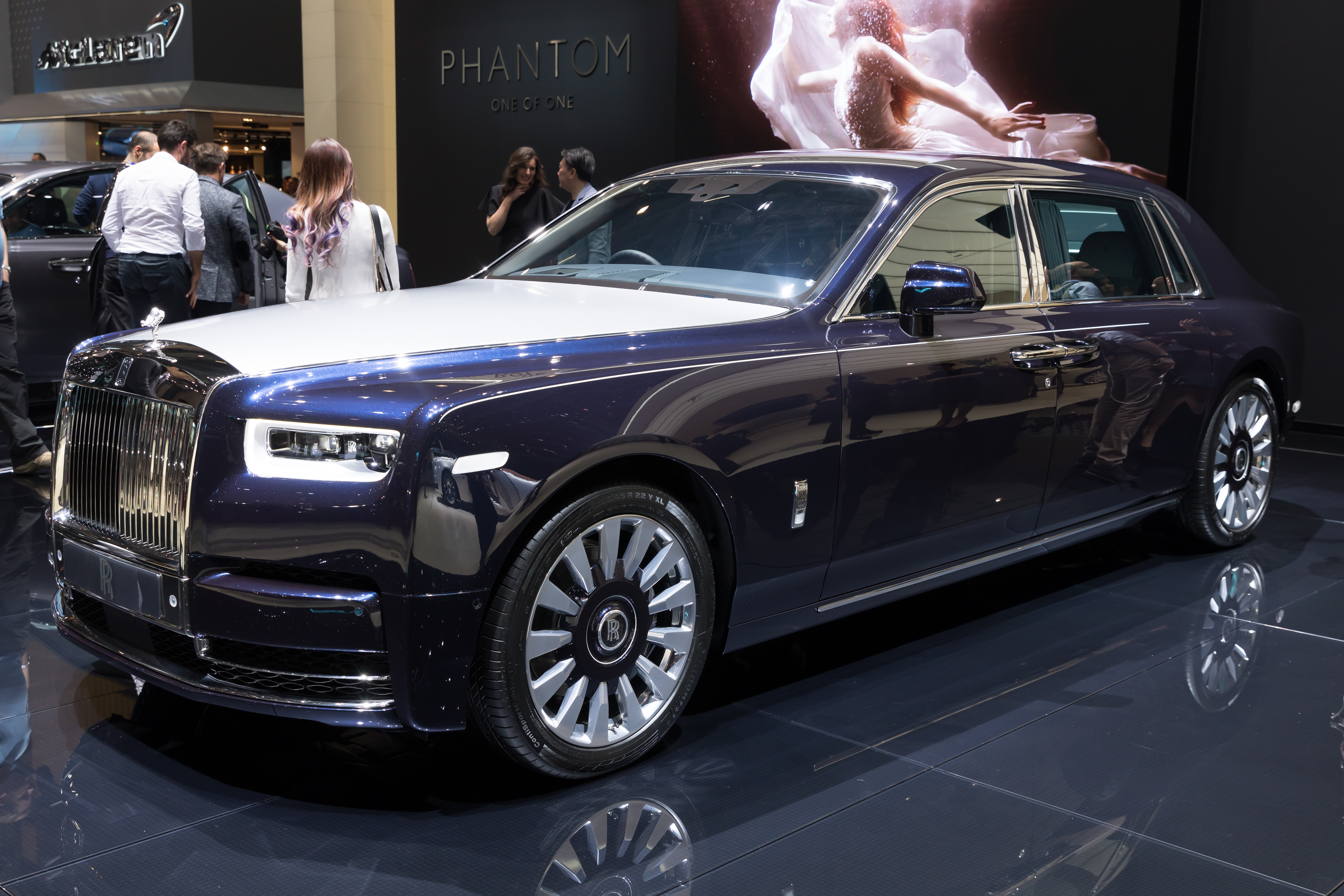
Phantom EWB front view

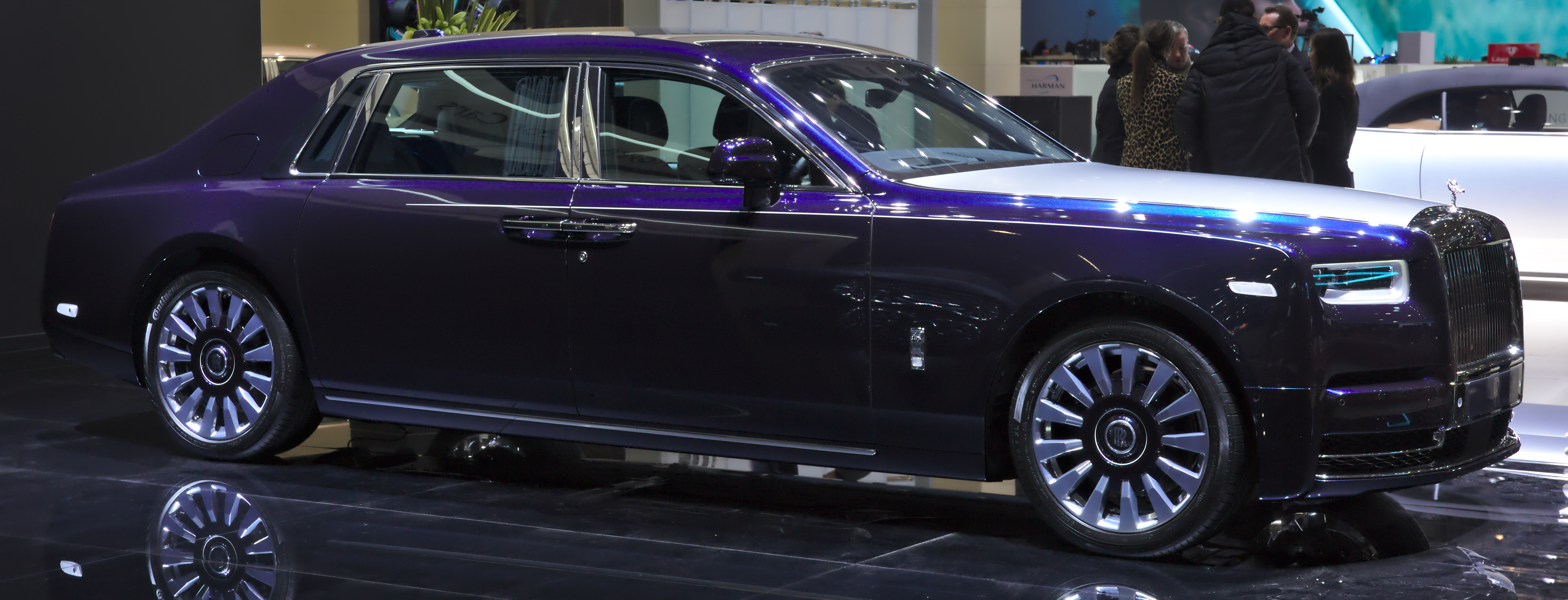
Phantom EWB side view

The Rolls-Royce Phantom Extended Wheelbase (EWB), or the Phantom Extended, is a special variant of the Rolls-Royce Phantom that is 220 mm (8.7 in) longer than the standard model.

The car's exterior design is identical to that of the original Phantom and excluding the length, every feature has been adapted from the standard model.

The car's rear passenger compartment has been enlarged and the interior features a "Starlight Headliner" that uses more than 1500 fibre optics elements to create the impression of a night sky with stars. This technology was first used on the Phantom Celestial.

The interior features a partition between the front cockpit and the rear passenger compartment, and the rear passenger compartment has been made soundproof for privacy and is known as the "Privacy Suite" by the Rolls-Royce Motor Cars.

Buyers can customize the car's interior to some extent – the "Gallery" allows customization of the dashboard and other minor details.

== Phantom Series II ==
In May 2022, Rolls-Royce announced the Series II car, to be available from the 2023 model year. Series II has a number of updated and improved features, including:

- new garnish above the Pantheon Grille and above the LED Daytime Running Lamps
- headlamps have been revised come with bezel starlights
- a new set of disc wheels
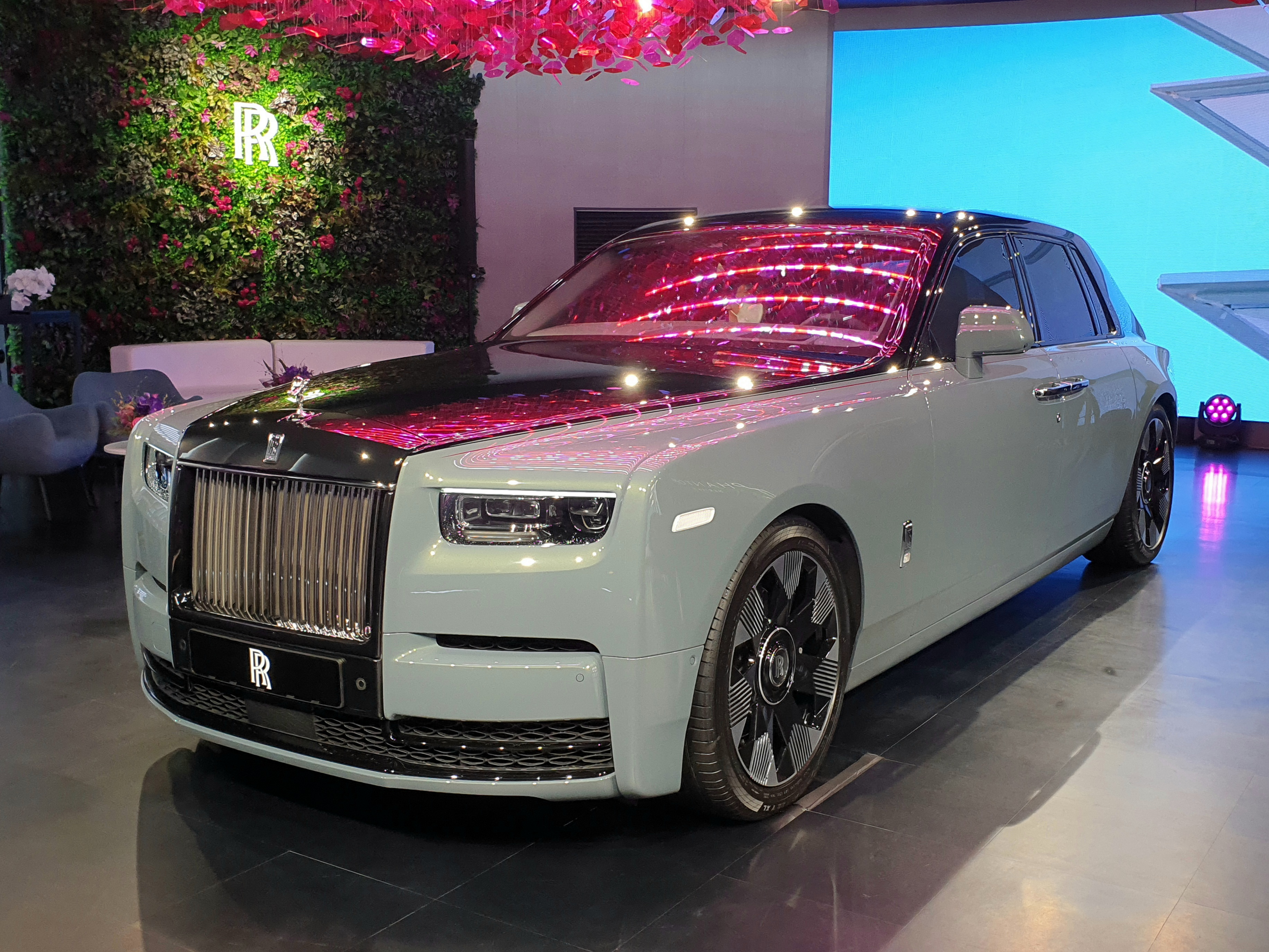
Rolls-Royce Phantom VIII Series II Front View.

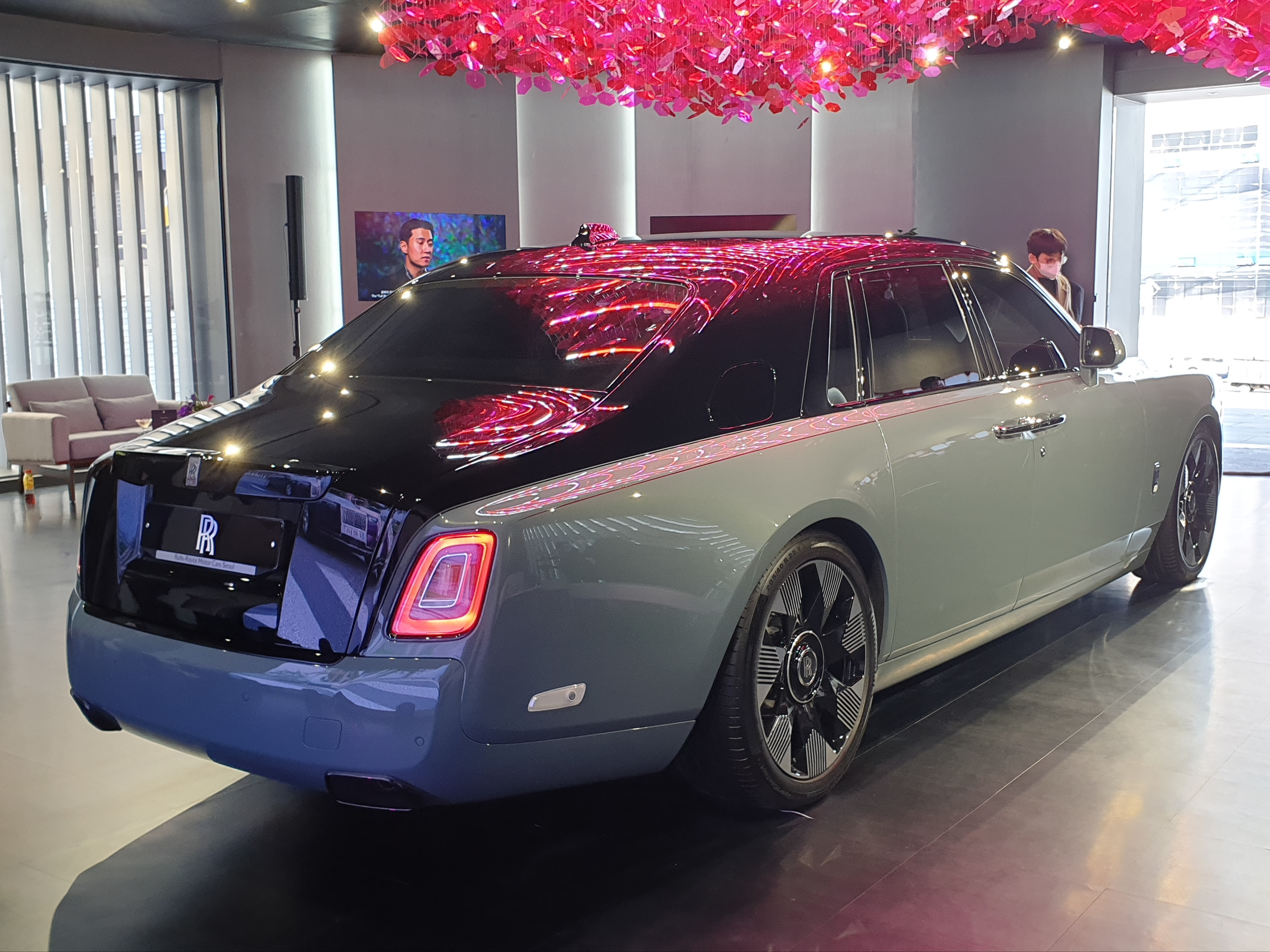
Rolls-Royce Phantom VIII Series II Rear View.

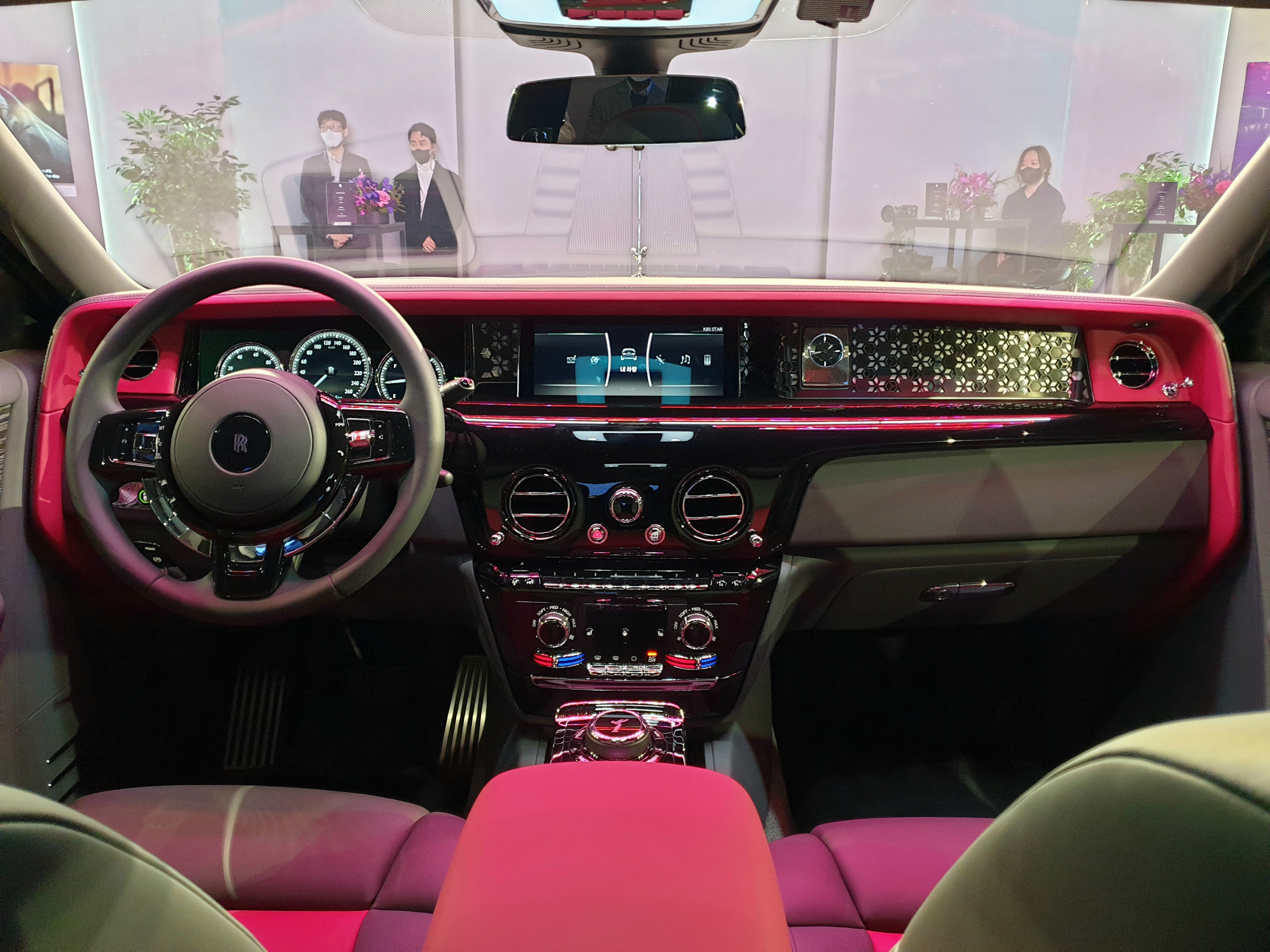
Rolls-Royce Phantom VIII Series II Interior.

== Special Editions ==
=== Phantom Goldfinger (2024) ===
The Rolls-Royce Phantom Goldfinger is a one-off Phantom EWB. It celebrates the 60-year anniversary of the Rolls-Royce Phantom III Sedanca de Ville (1937) driven by Auric Goldfinger in the 1964 James Bond film, Goldfinger.

=== Phantom Syntopia ===
The Phantom Syntopia is also a bespoke version designed in cooperation with fashion designer Iris van Herpen. It is based on the Rolls-Royce Phantom VIII EWB restyling. The body of the Phantom is painted in a color named "Liquid Black" specifically designed for this car. On the bonnet of the car, there are design elements called water motifs. On the interior of the car, there are 162 glass figures carved into the shooting star headliner.

=== Phantom Oribe (2021) ===
The one-off Phantom Oribe is crafted in Oribe Green and Cream colors. Commissioned by Yusaku Maezawa to match a recently commissioned private aircraft. The car was made in collaboration with French fashion brand and luxury leather goods maker Hermès. The car itself is made by Rolls-Royce but the interior is made by Hermès. The inspiration for the color was ancient Japanese 16th-century ceramics known as Oribe. The interior features Hermès leather covering of some visible parts, such as the fridge and the glove compartment.

== Specifications ==
=== Platform ===
The Phantom uses an aluminium spaceframe chassis; this is a version of Rolls-Royce's modular "Architecture of Luxury" platform. The Phantom is the first car to be based on this new platform, which is also used by the Cullinan SUV and will be used by other future Rolls-Royce models.

=== Suspension and steering ===
The Phantom is fitted with self-levelling air suspension and electronically controlled dampers front and rear. It uses a double wishbone front axle and a 5-link rear axle. It is also equipped with active anti-roll bars.

The suspension system is linked to a stereo camera mounted behind the windscreen. This scans the road ahead and preconfigures the spring and damper rates, and the anti-roll bars, so as to improve ride quality. The system, dubbed the "Flagbearer" by Rolls-Royce, operates at speeds of up to 100 km/h (62 mph).

The Phantom is the first Rolls-Royce to be fitted with four-wheel steering. The system turns the rear wheels counter to the front wheels through a maximum of 3° at speeds lower than 60 km/h (37 mph) to improve maneuverability. Between 60 and 80 km/h (37 and 50 mph) the rear wheels do not steer at all. At speeds above 80 km/h the rear wheels turn in the same direction as the front wheels through a maximum of 1° to increase high-speed stability.

The Phantom uses "Silent-Seal" tyres which Rolls-Royce co-developed with Continental. These use a layer of foam inside the tyre to reduce tyre cavity noise, lowering sound levels in the cabin by up to 9 decibels.

=== Interior ===
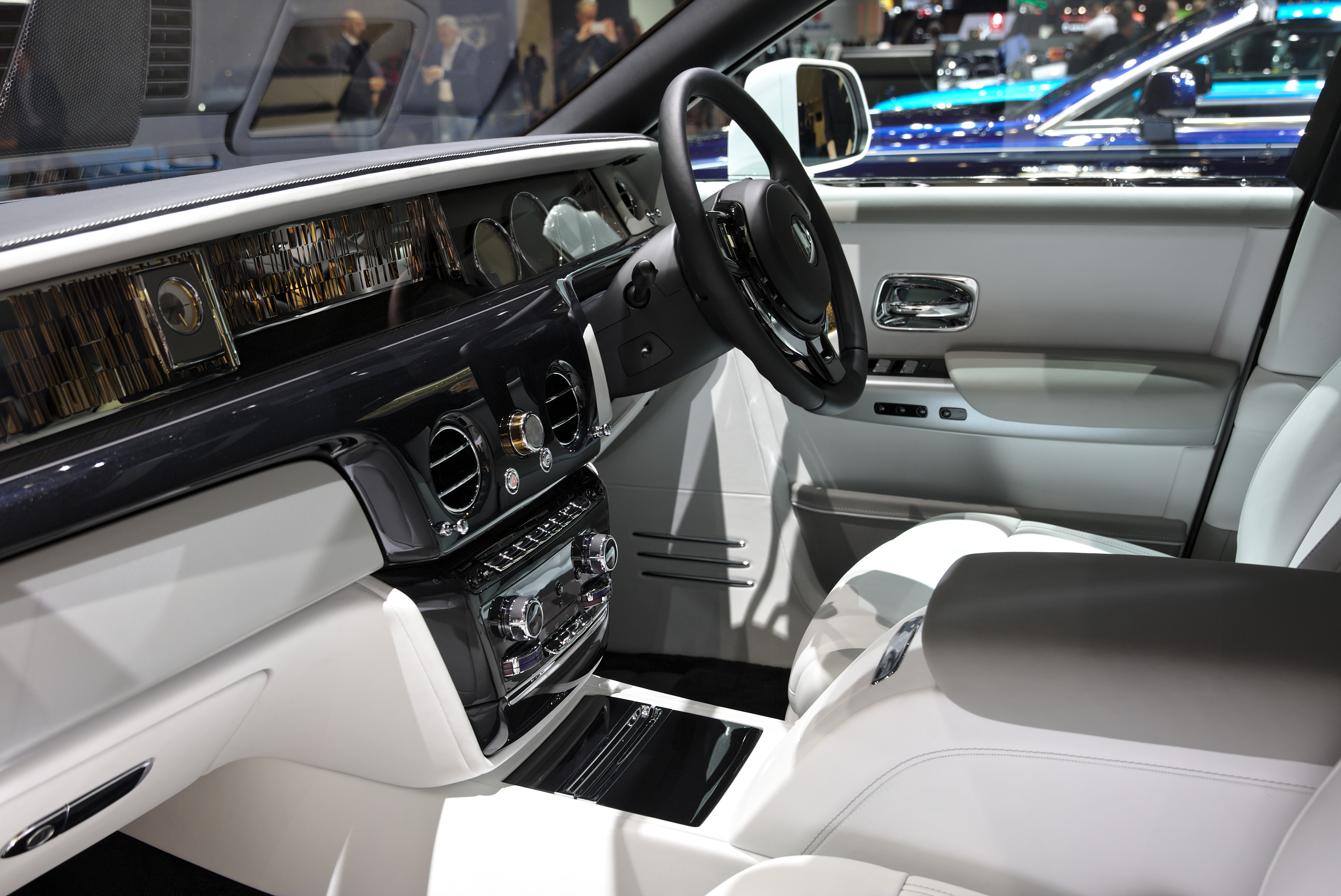
Interior

The interior is fully bespoke and personalised. The new generation Phantom uses the BMW iDrive V8.5 infotainment system with 3D camera view. They also have "The Gallery", a display section in the vehicle in the front seat veneer with experimentation of different materials and artwork to be integrated with the vehicle and all the options are limitless.

=== Powertrain ===
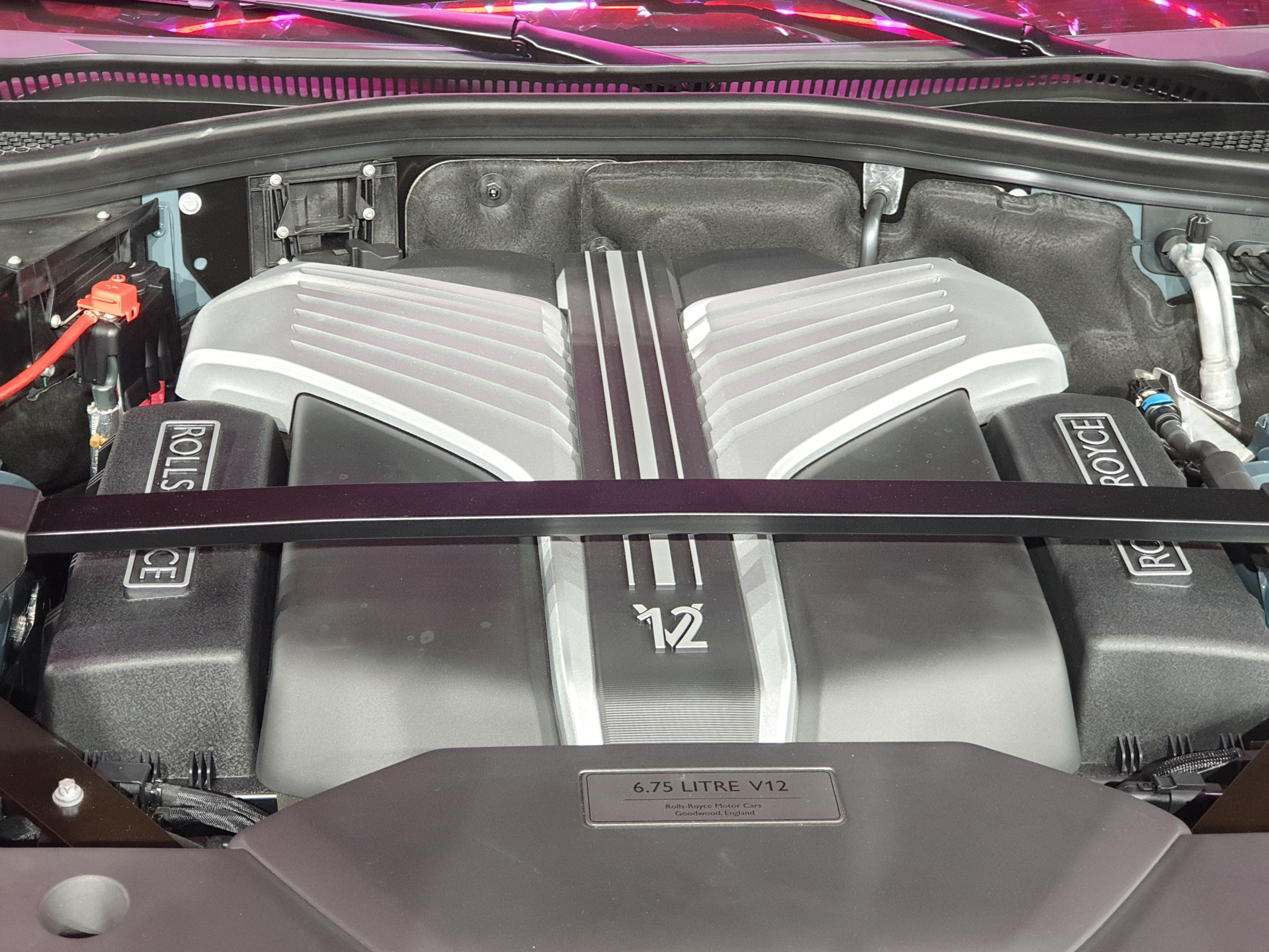
Rolls-Royce Phantom V12 engine

The Phantom is supplied with a twin-turbocharged 6.75-litre V12 engine. This is a variant of BMW's N74 called the N74B68, which is unique to the Phantom.

ZF's 8HP 8-speed automatic transmission is the sole gearbox option. This is linked to a GPS receiver that analyses the car's location and speed to optimise gear changes.

Performance data
Model	Displacement	Power	Torque	Top speed	0–100 km/h (0-62 mph)
Phantom	6.75 L (412 cu in)	563 hp; 571 PS (420 kW) at 5,000 rpm	900 N⋅m (664 lb⋅ft) at 1,700 rpm	250 km/h (155 mph)	5.3 seconds
Phantom Extended Wheelbase	6.75 L (412 cu in)	563 hp; 571 PS (420 kW) at 5,000 rpm	900 N⋅m (664 lb⋅ft) at 1,700 rpm	250 km/h (155 mph)	5.4 seconds

== Equipment ==
The Electronic Architecture of the New Phantom is the largest ever component produced by the BMW Group, let alone Rolls-Royce. Some, but not all, assistance systems on-board New Phantom include:

- Night vision
- 4-camera system with Panoramic View
- Alertness-assistant
- Adaptive cruise control
- 7x3 HD Head-up display
- WiFi hotspot
- Laser headlights with high-beam range of more than 600 metres

== Reception ==
The Phantom has been very well received by automotive journalists, with many outlets considering it to be the best luxury car on sale. The Phantom's refinement came in for particularly high praise, with Matt Prior in Autocar labelling it "utterly exceptional", while Mike Duff in Car and Driver described it as "freakishly quiet".

Ride quality was adjudged to be similarly good; Gavin Green in Car remarked that the Phantom's ride comfort is "a cut above anything on the road", and Angus MacKenzie in Motor Trend said "the ride is truly magical". The Phantom's interior also came in for praise: it was variously described as "utterly exemplary", "wonderful" and "spectacular". In light of its weight and size, magazines considered the Phantom's driving dynamics to be impressive: reviewers praised the car's surprising dynamism and agility, light and precise steering, and excellent brake pedal feel.

The Phantom was named Top Gear's 2017 "Luxury Car of the Year". It has received the UK Car of the Year Awards’ prestigious ‘Best Luxury Car’ honour. Drawing on votes from a jury of 27 leading motoring journalists, the awards highlight the best new cars on the market for UK customers. Autocar gave the 2018 Phantom a "Five Star Car" award at the 2018 Autocar Awards.

== Production and sales ==
Year	2018	2019	2020	2021	2022	2023	2024	2025
Deliveries	830	604	360	427	418	505	413	376

The Phantom is assembled by hand at Rolls-Royce's plant in Goodwood, West Sussex, England. Customer deliveries commenced in January 2018. According to a statement from BMW AG, Rolls-Royce and similar institutions, this generation of automobiles with combustion engines will end in 2030, due to the company switching to electric models.
