= Hongqi Guoya =

Full-size luxury sedan

Overview
- Manufacturer: Hongqi (FAW Group)
- Also called: Hongqi L1
- Production: March 2024 – present
- Assembly: China: Changchun, Jilin
- Designer: Giles Taylor

Body and chassis
- Class: Full-size luxury car (F); Ultra-luxury car
- Body style: 4-door sedan
- Layout: Longitudinal F4 layout

Powertrain
- Engine: Petrol: 3.0 L CA6GV30TD-30 V6 turbo; 4.0 L CA8GV40TD-01 V8 twin-turbo
- Electric motor: 160 kW (210 hp; 220 PS) permanent magnet synchronous
- Power output: 280 kW (380 PS; 380 hp) (3.0 T, petrol engine only); 370 kW (500 PS; 500 hp) (3.0 T, combined system output); 350 kW (480 PS; 470 hp) (4.0 T, petrol engine only); 430 kW (580 PS; 580 hp) (4.0 T, combined system output)
- Transmission: 8-speed ZF 8HP80 automatic transmission
- Hybrid drivetrain: Power-split hybrid
- Battery: NMC lithium-ion

Dimensions
- Wheelbase: 3,260 mm (128.3 in)
- Length: 5,353 mm (210.7 in)
- Width: 1,998 mm (78.7 in)
- Height: 1,511 mm (59.5 in)
- Curb weight: 2,455–2,595 kg (5,412–5,721 lb)

The Hongqi Guoya (Chinese: 红旗金葵花国雅) or Hongqi L1 is a full-size luxury sedan produced by Chinese automobile manufacturer Hongqi, a subsidiary of FAW Group.

== History ==
On 25 April 2024, at 2024 Auto China, the Guoya was announced to start accepting reservations.

In November 2024, the Guoya will be launched at the 2024 Auto Guangzhou.

Rear view

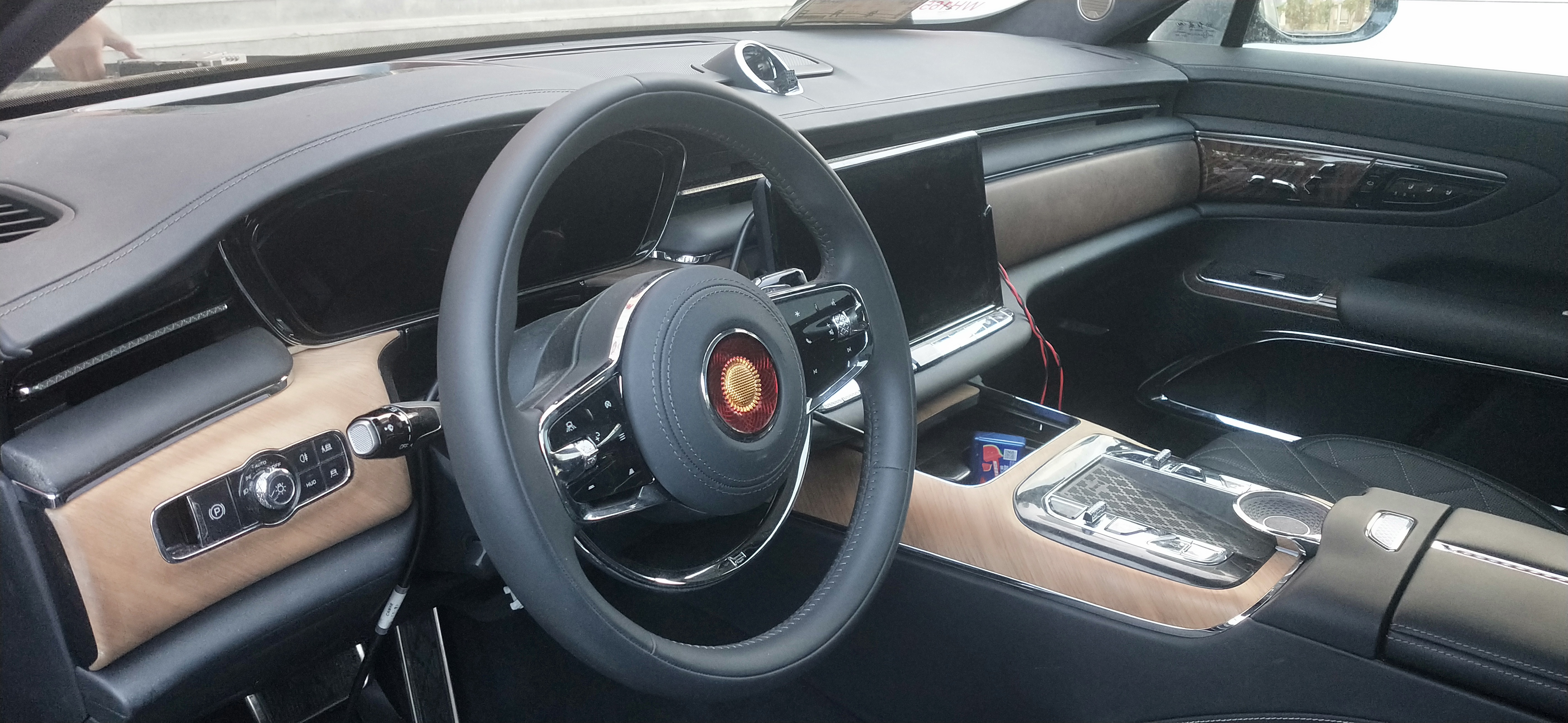
Interior

== Specifications ==
The Guoya is equipped with a turbocharged 3.0-liter V6 or 4.0-liter V8 engine and is paired with an 8-speed automatic transmission and a power-split hybrid system. The maximum power of the 3.0-liter engine reaches 394 horsepower (294 kW; 399 PS), while the 4.0-liter engine reaches 480 horsepower (358 kW; 487 PS).

== Sales ==
| Year | China |
|---|---|
| 2024 | 40 |
| 2025 | 192 |
