= Land yacht (automobile) =

Motor vehicle classification

A land yacht is an informal category of large automobiles. While full-size cars are manufactured worldwide to this day, the term is most often used to describe the full-size cars of American origin between 1960 and 1976.

Alongside full-size and luxury four-door sedans, the land yacht term applied to multiple body styles, including two-door notchback sedans, personal luxury cars, coupés, convertibles, and station wagons.

Land yachts are among the largest mass-produced cars manufactured. Their length is comparable to the full-size SUVs of the mid 2020s.

== American cars ==
The term "land yacht" emerged in the late 1950s, as American full-size luxury cars proliferated, often independently of mainstream nameplates. Initially, this descriptor celebrated the vehicles' opulent comfort features and exceptionally soft, compliant ride quality. These cars were designed for "the open road where living room-comfortable seats made the front seat seem like a plush couch with a windshield and steering wheel in front of it, emphasizing a relaxed, effortless cruising experience."

Throughout the 1960s and into the 1970s, almost all American automobile manufacturers produced land yachts of various types. The most prominent and largest examples typically came from luxury divisions such as Cadillac, Lincoln, Imperial, and Buick. The "Brougham" trim level, often denoting increased luxury appointments, became a popular suffix for many of these models in the 1970s.

However, the perception of the "land yacht" underwent a significant transformation following the global oil crises of 1973 and 1979. The term rapidly acquired negative connotations, primarily referencing these cars' perceived drawbacks: their excessive size, unwieldy handling (a direct consequence of their soft, comfort-oriented suspension), vague steering, and notoriously poor fuel economy from their oversized 'big block' V8 engines.

The 1973 oil crisis marked the first significant turning point, forcing American automakers to confront the urgent need for downsizing. This period in the automotive industry, although described as the malaise era, contributed to many advances and coincided with a broader shift in consumer preferences. Improvement included lowered emissions, lighter components, aerodynamics, computerization, as well as moving away from sheer glamour towards more practical considerations such as quality, feature content, and fuel economy.

An example is the redesigned 1974 Ambassador introduced by American Motors (AMC). It became AMC's last full-size car built on a 122-inch (3,099 mm) wheelbase and offered exclusively in the luxurious Brougham trim. This larger and more opulent Ambassador gained weight due to new federal bumper impact standards. Concurrent were tightening emissions regulations that diminished engine power output, while gasoline prices rapidly escalated. As consumers gravitated towards more economical vehicles, Ambassador sales declined, and it was discontinued after just one model year.

The 1979 oil crisis delivered a second, equally powerful shock to the U.S. automotive industry, forcing manufacturers again to "struggle to redirect the inertia of bigger cars and engines"." Flagship models were not immune; for example, the Chrysler brand's top-tier New Yorker, with its 124 in (3,150 mm) wheelbase and 440 cu in (7.2 L) V8 engine, was discontinued after the 1978 model year, eventually succeeded by a significantly smaller model.

In the early 1990s, General Motors (1991) and Ford (1992) introduced their last major redesigns of traditional full-size, body-on-frame sedans. Following the 1996 model year, General Motors phased out production of its classic rear-wheel-drive land yachts, including the Buick Roadmaster, Chevrolet Caprice, and Cadillac Fleetwood. The final chapter for this vehicle class closed in 2012 with the discontinuation of the Ford Panther platform, which had underpinned the Ford Crown Victoria, Mercury Grand Marquis, and Lincoln Town Car, marking the definitive demise of the "traditional" American full-size sedan.

Excluding purpose-built limousines, the longest American-produced production sedan remains the 1974 through 1976 Cadillac Fleetwood 75 nine-passenger sedan, which stretched 252.2 in (6,406 mm). For sheer mass, the heaviest American-produced car (excluding trucks and SUVs) is the 1960 Lincoln Continental convertible, with a weight of 5,712 lb (2,591 kg). These figures serve as reminders of the scale achieved during the "land yacht" era.

As of 2025, the following remain the longest and heaviest production passenger cars made by American manufacturers.

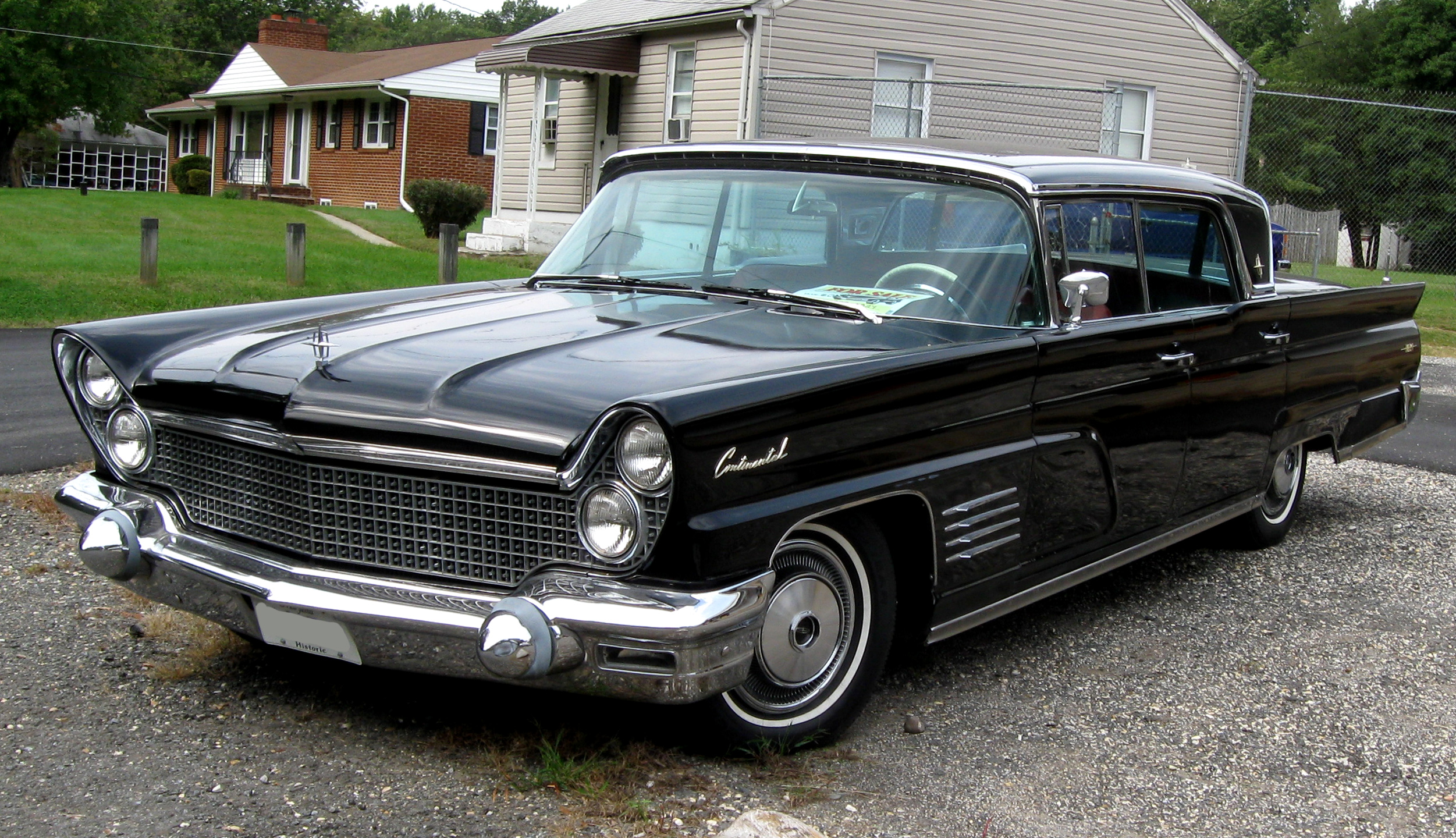
1960 Lincoln Continental

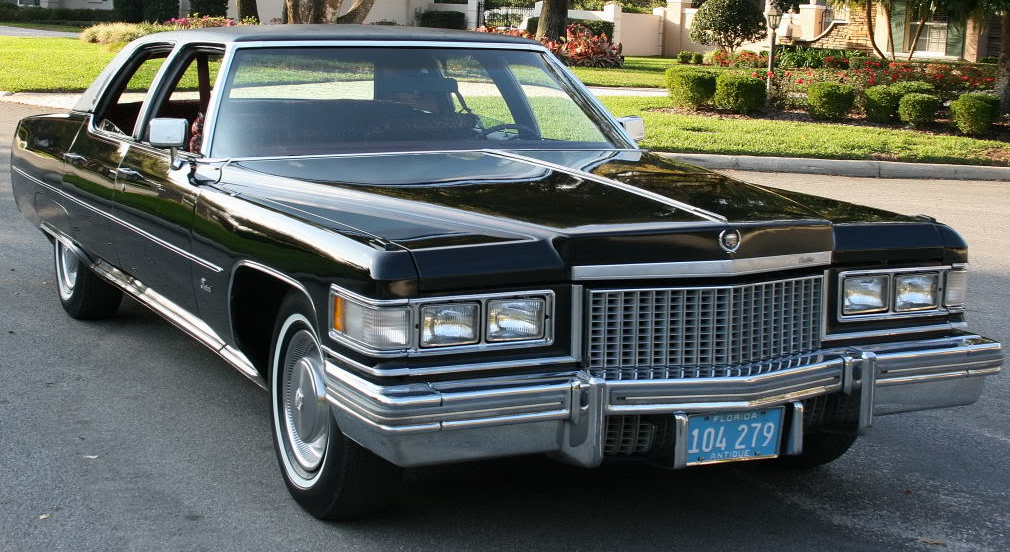
1975 Cadillac Sixty Special Brougham

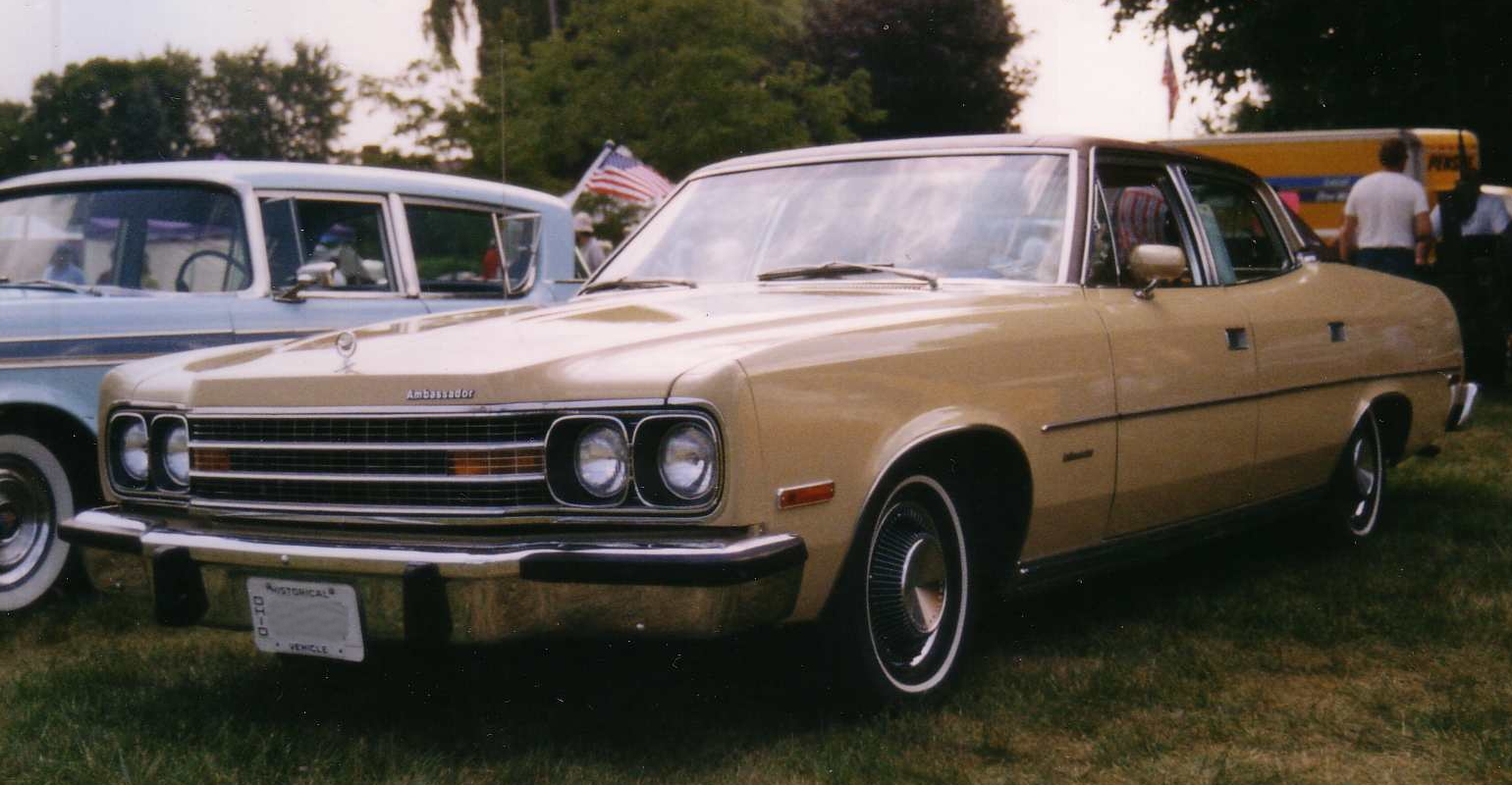
1974 AMC Ambassador

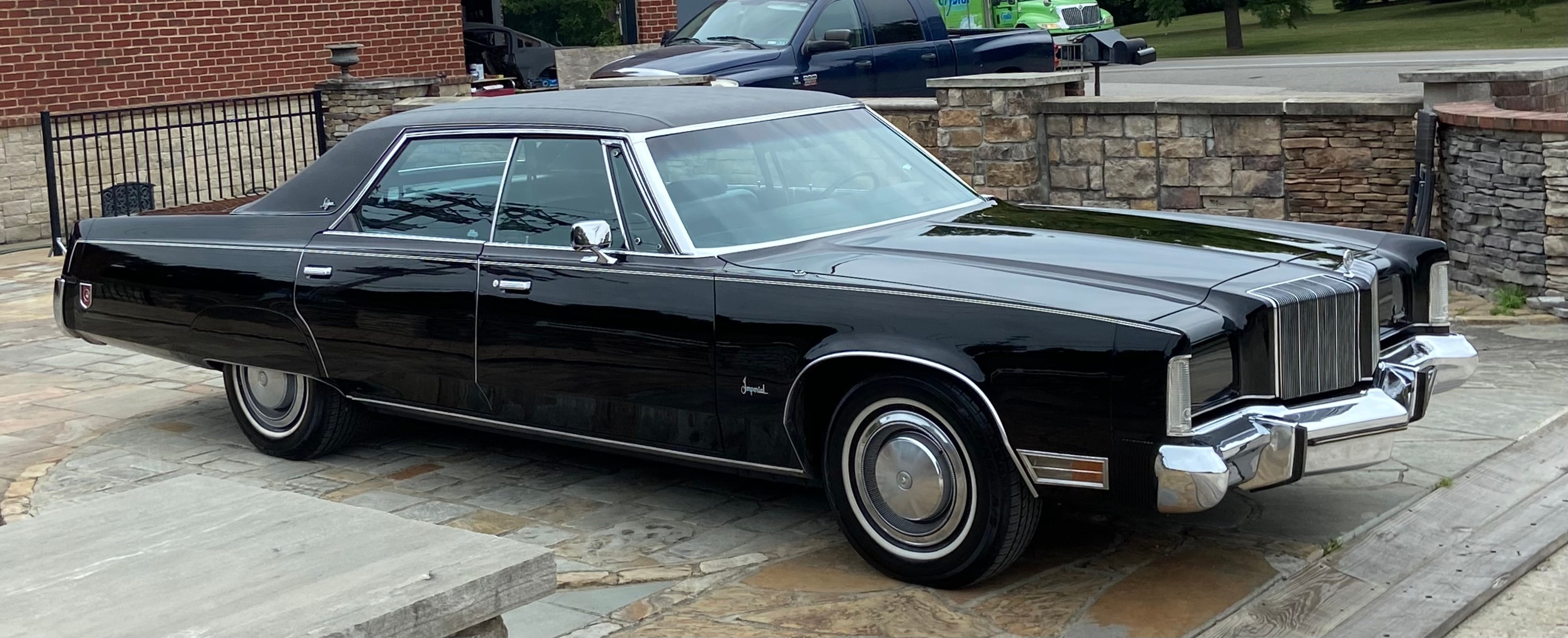
1974 Chrysler New Yorker

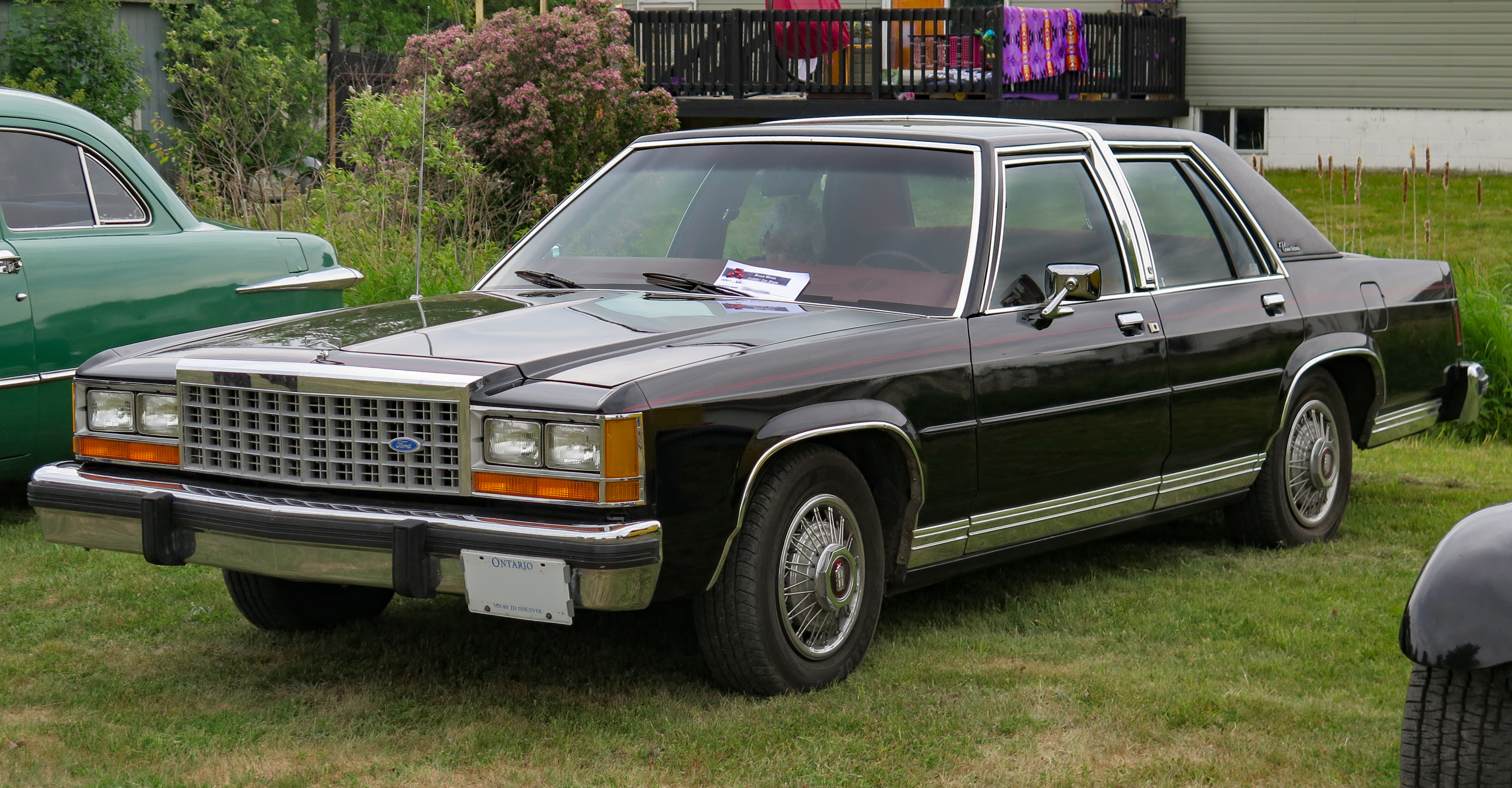
1987 Ford LTD Crown Victoria LX

Although the last "true" land yacht built in the United States has been described as the 2011 Lincoln Town Car, consumer preferences have shifted to even larger luxury-type SUVs and pickup trucks. Although almost as long as the historic land-yachts, modern large-size SUVs are much taller and heavier. Their four-wheel-drive systems may provide additional ground clearance, but require higher cabin floors, while heavy-duty frames, safety structures, and many amenities - such as 30-way massaging seats, adaptive air suspension, and simultaneously reclining three rows of seats - contribute to hundreds of additional pounds compared to traditional land-yachts.

== European cars ==
Outside North America, the term "land yacht" sees little use on locally produced cars, primarily due to different consumer demands, though large executive cars with similar niches in the European markets to land yachts in America were marketed and manufactured. Past and present, several flagship models from Rolls-Royce, Mercedes-Benz, and Bentley have placed ride comfort as a primary design objective, with dimensions comparable to the largest American saloons produced.

In contrast to its LWB counterpart, the Mercedes-Benz 600 SWB was developed to be driven by its owner; it was produced nearly exclusively as a four-door saloon. The 1963–1981 600 SWB has a length of up to 5,540 mm (218.1 in) and a vehicle weight of 2,475 kg (5,456 lb).

The Rolls-Royce Phantom VII (and the currently produced Phantom VIII successor) are positioned as flagship saloons, breaking from the previous Phantom model line of limousines bodied by coachbuilders. The standard-wheelbase Phantom VII is 5,760 mm (226.9 in) long, with a kerb weight of 2,560 kg (5,644 lb). Following the 2002–2012 Maybach 57 and 62, Mercedes-Benz revived the nameplate as its Mercedes-Maybach sub-brand in 2015. The Mercedes-Maybach S650 is 20 cm (7.8 in) longer than its Mercedes-Benz S-Class counterpart, with the S650 having a length of 5.45 m (214.7 in), weighing 2,285 kg (5,037 lb). Similarly, Bentley has traditionally produced rivals to Rolls-Royces biggest vehicles, most recently with its Mulsanne, which was 5,580 mm (219.5 in) long in its shortest form, and as much as 6,580 mm (258.9 in) in Grand Limousine specification. Aston Martin has also produced large-sized models including the 1974–1990 Lagonda and the Lagonda Taraf.

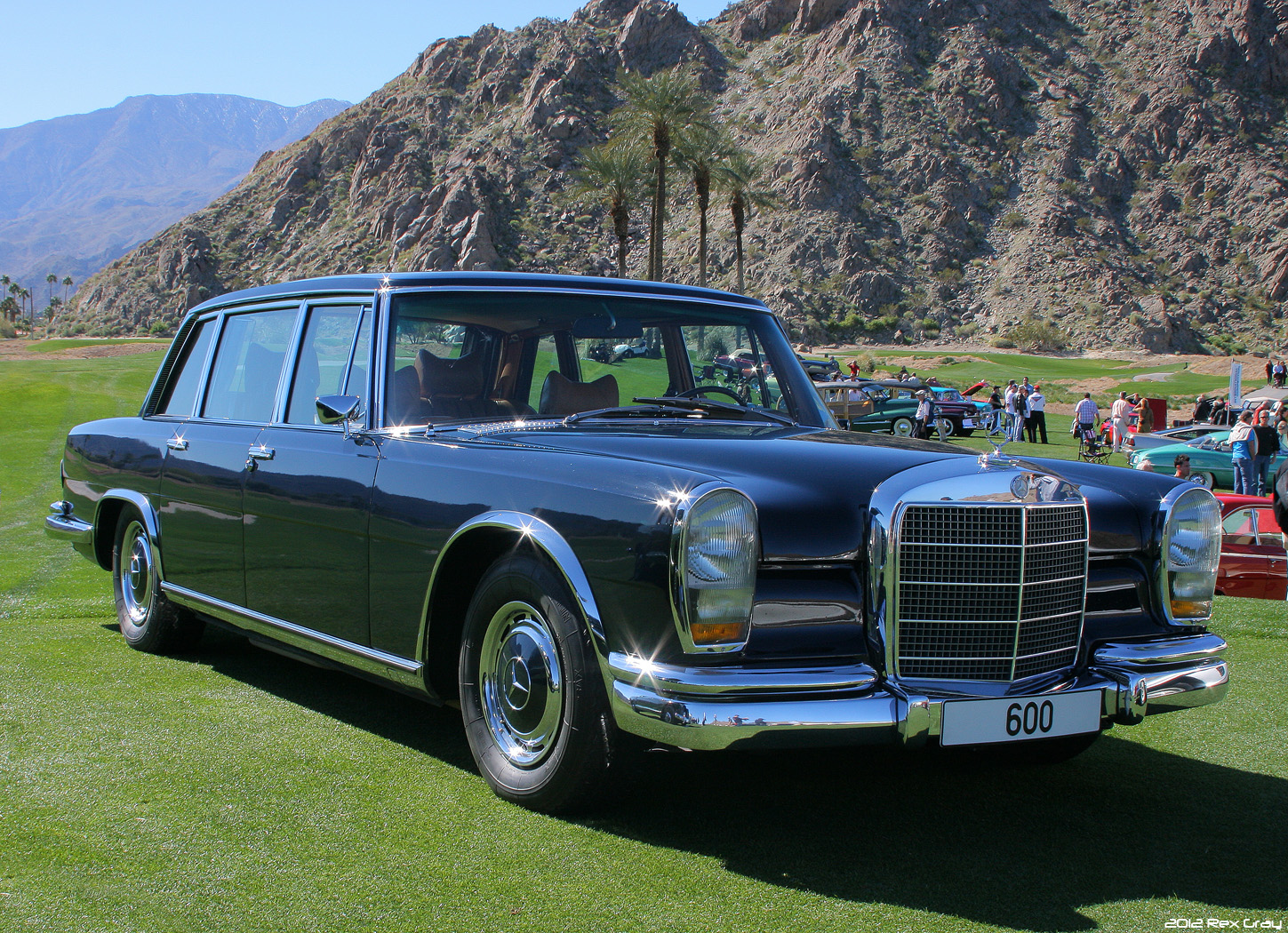
1969 Mercedes-Benz 600

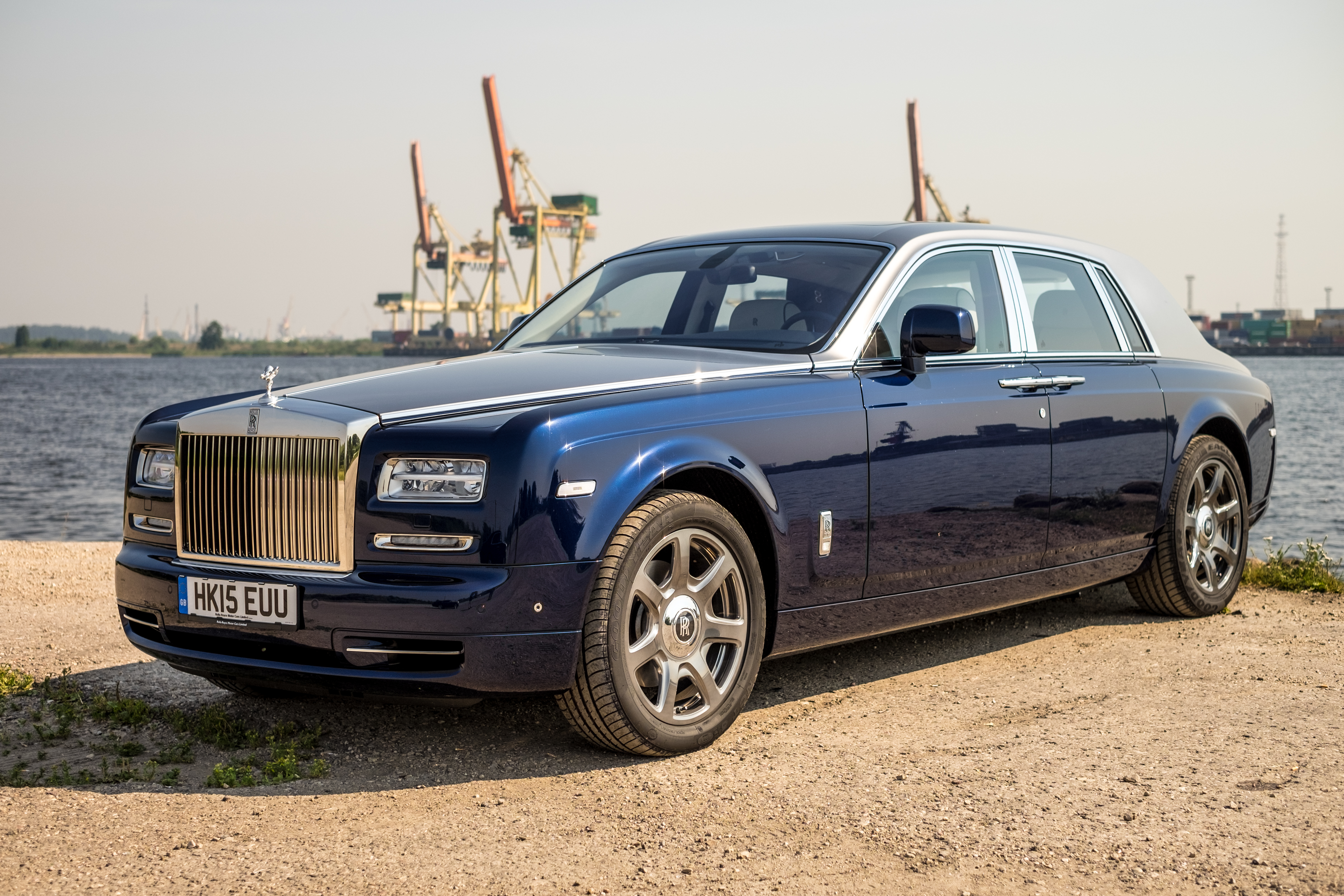
2015 Rolls-Royce Phantom

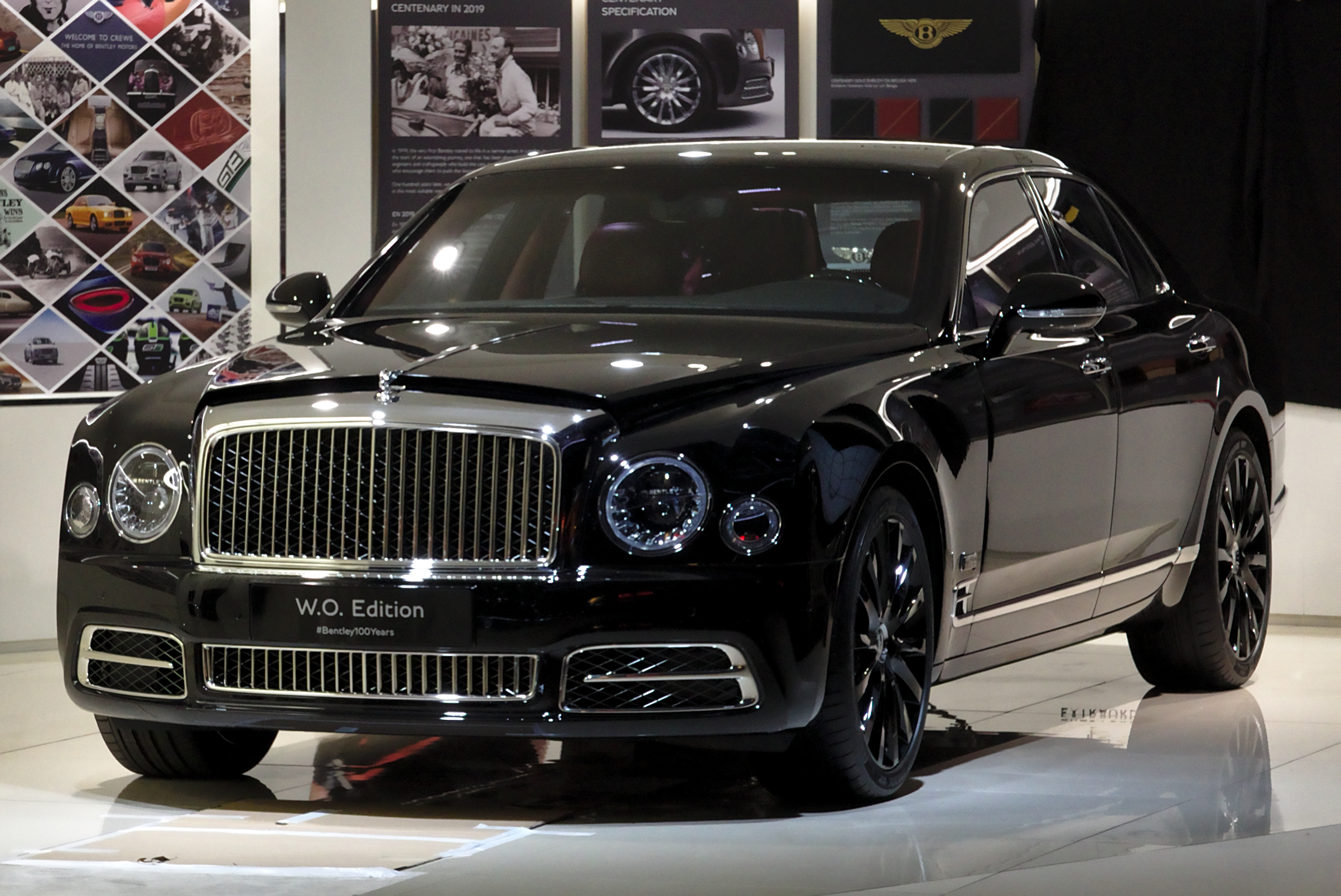
2019 Bentley Mulsanne William Owen Edition

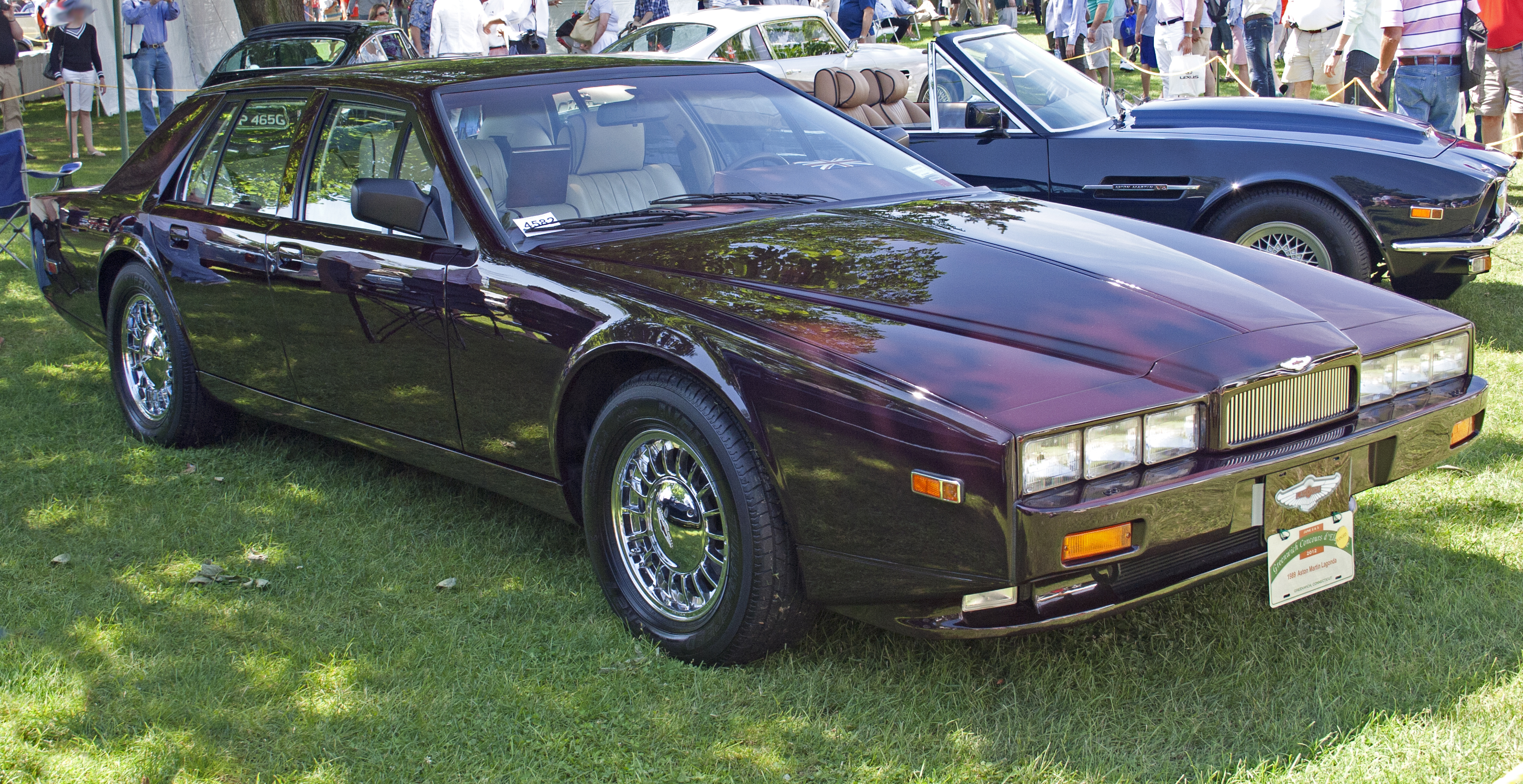
Aston Martin Lagonda

== Recreational vehicles and trailers ==
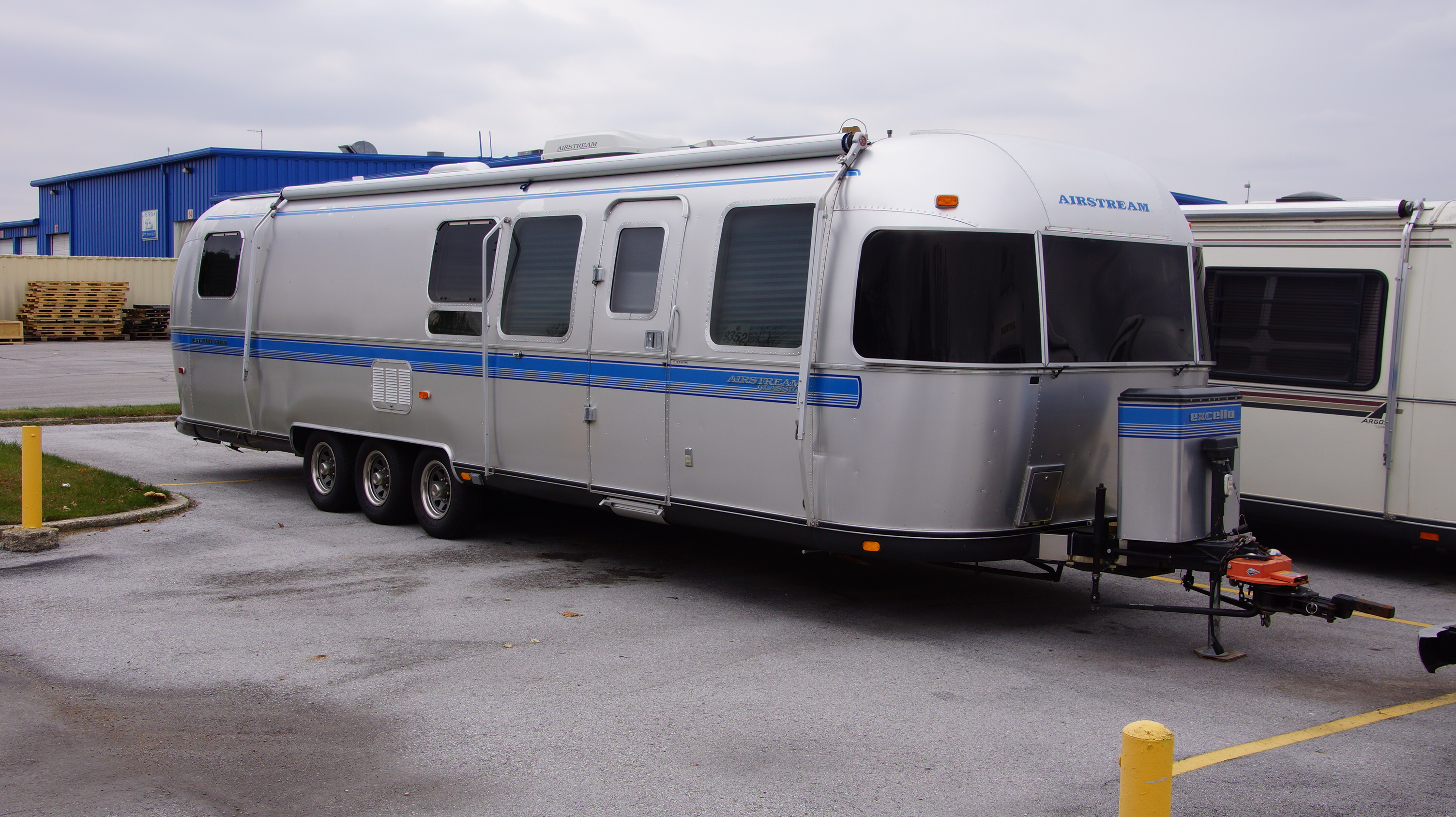
Airstream three-axle travel trailer

The "land yacht" description was used in the 1941 film Sullivan's Travels to describe a bus converted with bedrooms, bathroom, and kitchen, or an early recreational vehicle (RV).

Airstream, an American manufacturer of RV trailers (caravans), used Land Yacht as the model name of its flagship model line of trailers.

== See also ==
- Full-size car
- List of longest consumer road vehicles
