= Giles Taylor =

British car designer

- Education: Royal College of Art
- Occupation: Automotive design
- Employer: FAW Group
- Notable work: Rolls-Royce Phantom VIII; Rolls-Royce Cullinan; Jaguar XJ (X351); Hongqi Guoli; Hongqi L1; Hongqi LS7

Giles Taylor is a British car designer. He is the current vice president of design and chief creative officer for the Chinese state-owned FAW Group’s Hongqi marque. Taylor worked as a chief designer for Rolls-Royce, Jaguar and as an exterior designer for Citroën. His designs include the eighth generation Rolls-Royce Phantom and the redesigned Jaguar XJ (X351).

== Education ==
Taylor studied automobile design in Coventry, England, before attending the Royal College of Art in London.

== Career ==
=== Citroen ===
Taylor undertook his first car design job for Citroen in 1997 aged twenty nine. The vehicle in question was the Citroën Xsara. Taylor claims that Citroen headhunted him after he left the Royal College of Art. He posits that he was one of several designers to submit sketches, but Citroen adopted his. Taylor oversaw the Xsara's exterior design through to the production stage. Taylor claims that he based the design on the Citroën Xantia.

=== Jaguar ===
Taylor joined Jaguar Cars in 1997 and worked for the organisation for fourteen years, latterly as the chief exterior designer.

Taylor was the chief exterior designer of the Jaguar XJ (X351). It replaced Jaguar’s traditional sedan, whose shape had not altered since 1968. Taylor claimed that the car cost four hundred million dollars to produce and that executives initially challenged some of its features, such as the blacked-out C column. The XJ debuted in July 2009 at London’s Saatchi Gallery. Taylor then exhibited the car at a selection of automobile design schools in the autumn of 2009, including the Pratt Institute and the Parsons School of Design in New York, the ArtCenter College of Design in Pasadena, and the College for Creative Studies in Detroit.

In 2010 Taylor headed the design of the Jaguar XJ75 Platinum Concept that marked the brand’s seventy-fifth anniversary. Its exterior design employed a black-and-white colour scheme, while the interior styling included a clock co-designed with the Bremont Watch Company. Taylor also worked on the Jaguar XK and XJ series. He left the organisation in 2011.

=== Rolls-Royce ===
Rolls-Royce Cullinan

Taylor joined Rolls-Royce Motor Cars as head of exterior design in 2011, replacing Ian Cameron as head of design the following year. He was responsible for the interior and exterior design of the Rolls-Royce Ghost and Rolls-Royce Phantom series, among others. He left the organisation in September 2018.

During his time at Rolls-Royce, Taylor worked as a stylist for the Rolls-Royce Phantom VIII.

He oversaw the design of the 2016 Dawn. Taylor designed the Rolls-Royce Cullinan, the marque’s first sports utility vehicle.

=== Hongqi ===
Taylor joined the Chinese state-owned automaker FAW Group as Vice President of Design and Chief Creative Officer in 2018. Operating out of FAW’s Advanced Design Center in Munich, Germany, he leads design strategy and concept development for Hongqi, China's premium luxury marque, along with broader corporate EV and autonomous vehicle portfolios.
