= Rolls-Royce Cullinan =

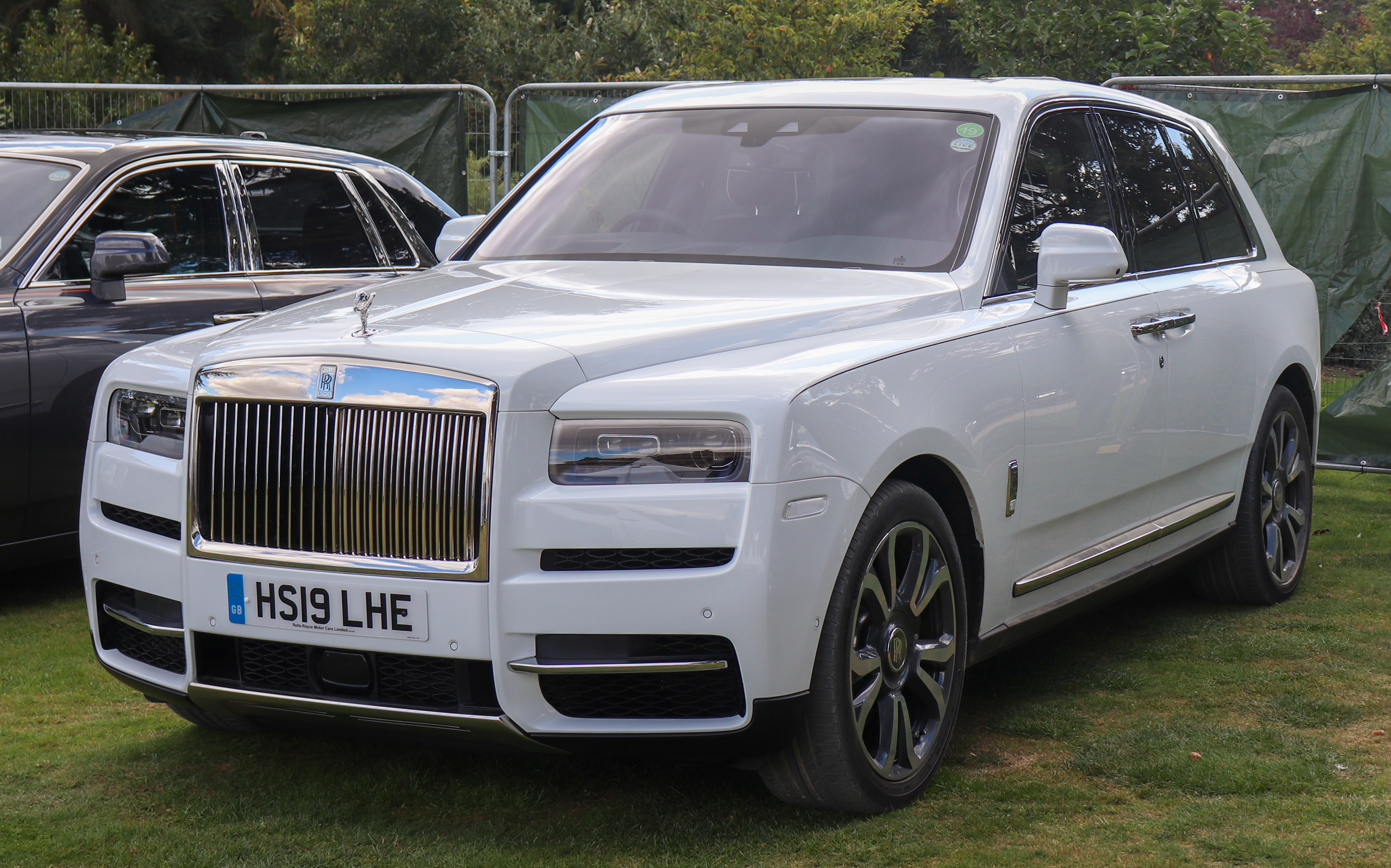

Overview
- Manufacturer: Rolls-Royce Motor Cars
- Production: 2018–present
- Assembly: United Kingdom: West Sussex, England (Goodwood plant)
- Designer: Giles Taylor

Body and chassis
- Class: Full-size luxury crossover SUV (F)
- Body style: 5-door SUV
- Layout: Front-engine, four-wheel-drive layout
- Platform: Architecture of Luxury
- Doors: Conventional doors (front)/Coach doors (rear)
- Related: Rolls-Royce Phantom VIII; Rolls-Royce Ghost; Rolls-Royce Spectre

Powertrain
- Engine: 6.75 L N74B68 twin-turbocharged V12 (petrol)
- Transmission: 8-speed 8HP automatic

Dimensions
- Wheelbase: 3,295 mm (129.7 in)
- Length: 5,341 mm (210.3 in)
- Width: 2,000 mm (78.7 in) (with mirrors: 2,164 mm (85.2 in))
- Height: 1,835 mm (72.2 in)
- Kerb weight: 2,660 kg (5,864.3 lb)

The Rolls-Royce Cullinan is a full-size luxury crossover sport utility vehicle (SUV)/4x4 manufactured by Rolls-Royce Motor Cars as the brand's first all-wheel drive vehicle. It is named after the Cullinan Diamond, the largest gem-quality rough diamond ever discovered.

The Cullinan is positioned above the Ghost and below the Phantom in Rolls-Royce's range, with a starting price in the United States of approximately US$325,000 (£255,000). It was unveiled in May 2018 at the Concorso d'Eleganza Villa d'Este in Italy, and launched globally at an Autumn press event later that year in Jackson Hole, Wyoming, US.

The Cullinan is the second best-selling Rolls-Royce of all time, after the Silver Shadow.

Rolls-Royce announced production of the Cullinan Series II would begin in August 2024.

== Overview ==
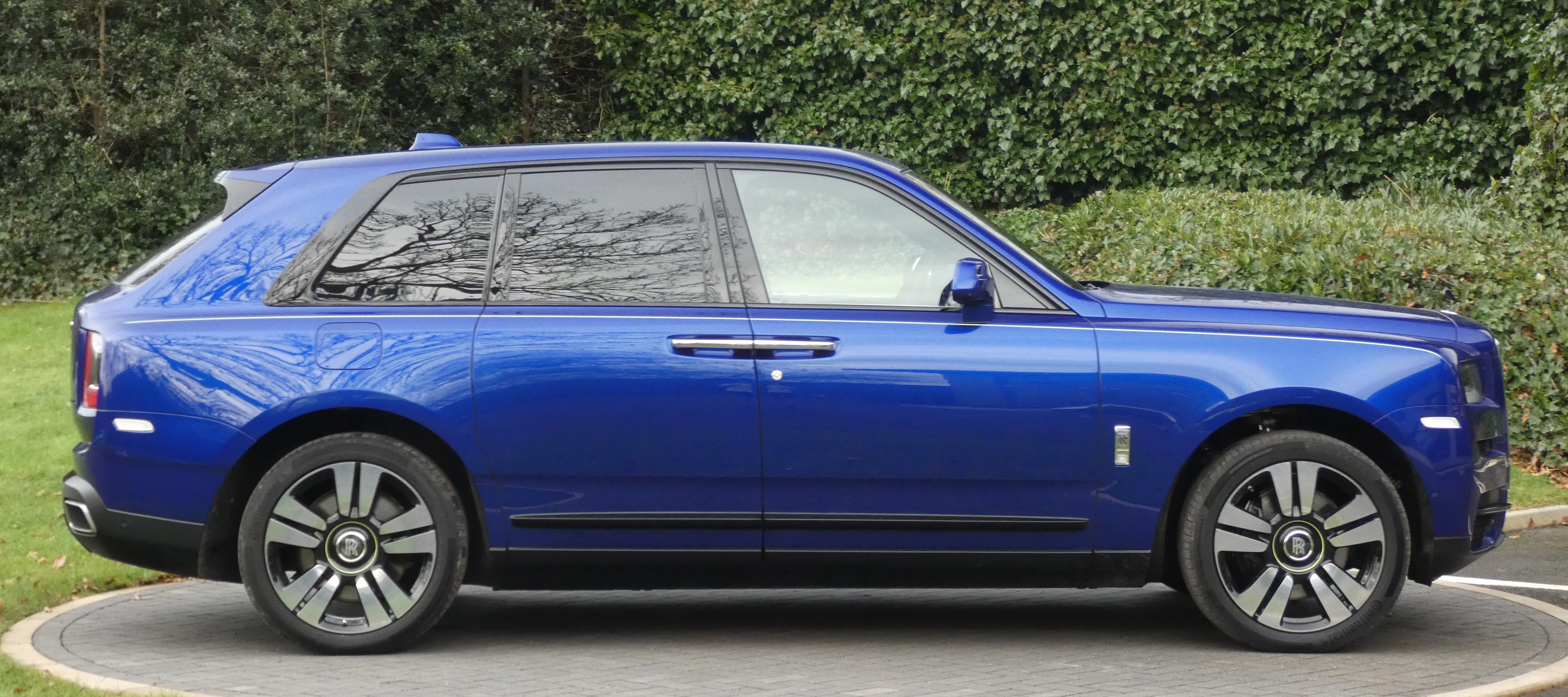
Side view

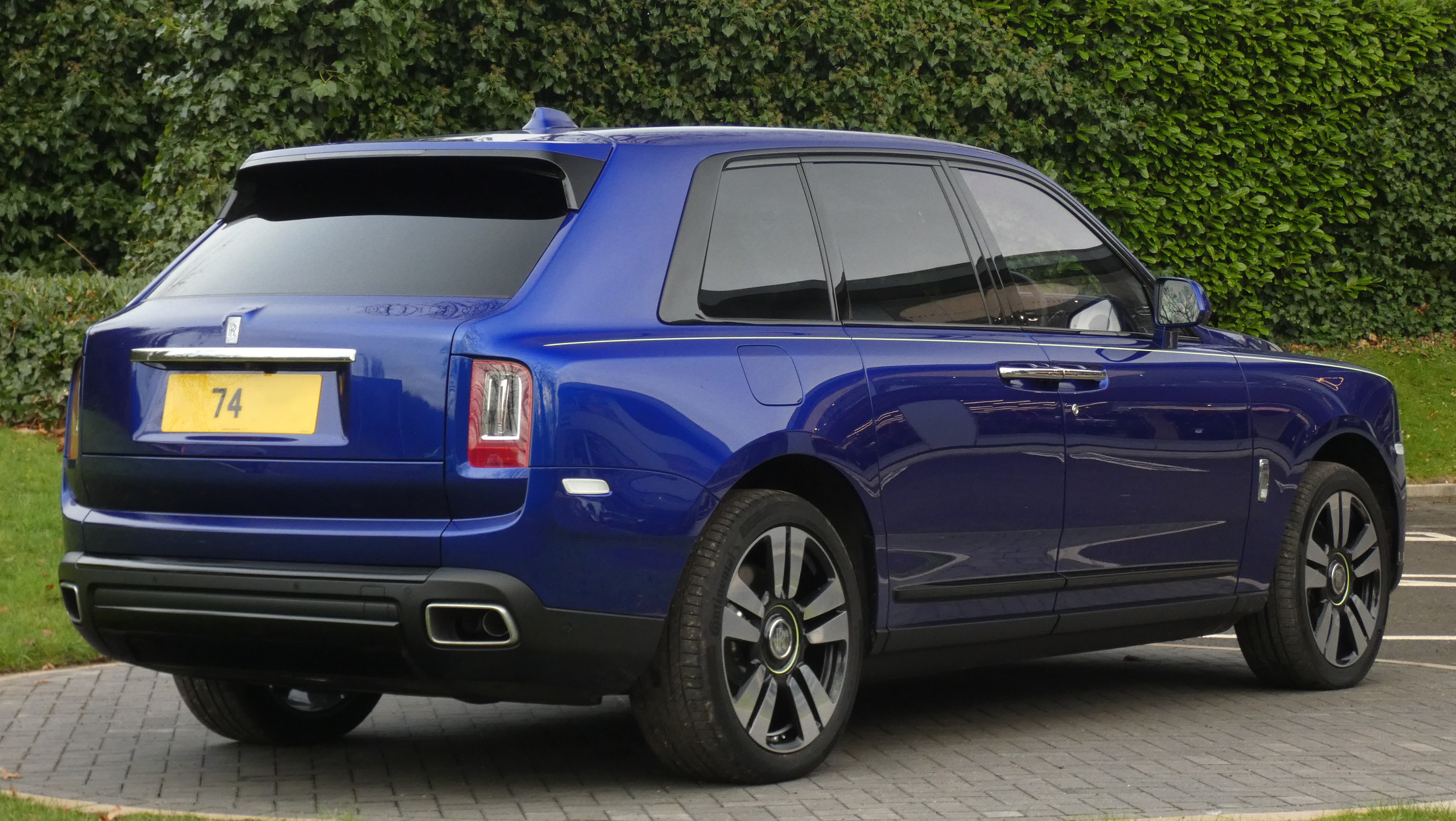
Rear ¾ view

In 2015 it was reported that a design was in the works and that the name would be Cullinan. This was due to its competitors such as Bentley and Lamborghini venturing into the SUV business with the Bentayga and the Urus respectively. At the 2015 Frankfurt Auto Show, Rolls-Royce's CEO Torsten Müller-Ötvös said that the SUV will be revealed in 2018 and be on the market in 2019.

The name "Cullinan" was confirmed by Rolls-Royce on 13 February 2018. It is named after the Cullinan Diamond, the largest diamond ever found at 3100 carats.

The car was reported to have started its testing phase on 2 January 2016, and was subsequently seen testing on snow. The final tests were conducted with the partnership of National Geographic in 2018 and it was tested in various terrains.

As of 2019 the company claimed that despite expanding production and hiring more employees, there were insufficient vehicles to satisfy the demand by established buyers.

In the US, it is not exempt from the Gas Guzzler Tax because it is classified as a station wagon rather than an SUV.

== Design and features ==
=== Design ===
Many of the Cullinan's exterior design elements have been adapted from the 8th generation Rolls-Royce Phantom, such as the front grille and the headlights.

=== Interior ===
The interior includes many of the same standard and optional features found in other Rolls-Royce models, such as a number of different upholstery and trim finishes in leather, wood, carbon fiber and more, as well as power closing doors, double paned windows, and a choice of an optional "Starlight" fiber optic headliner or panoramic sunroof. The Cullinan is offered as either a five-seater, with three-across seating in the rear, or as a four-seater, with two reclining and massaging rear seats with a center console in the middle. The car also features a split tailgate, with leather camping seats, known as the "cocktail suite", which are deployed from the luggage compartment. The Cullinan is the only Rolls-Royce to have a glass partition between the luggage compartment and the passenger compartment. Some critics did note the lack of certain high tech features found on less expensive SUVs though, such as automatic climate control and partially autonomous cruise control.

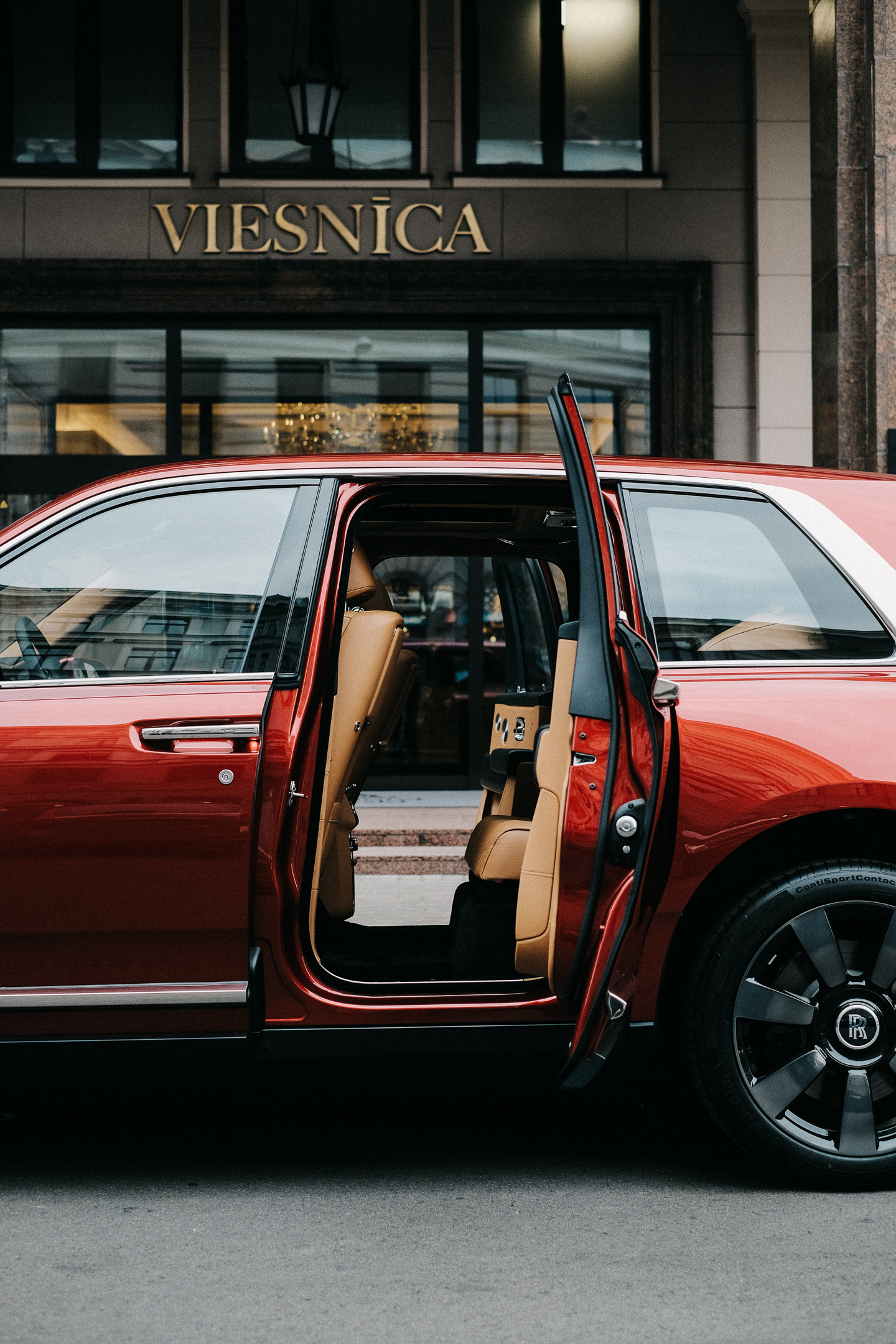
Cullinan with the rear suicide doors open

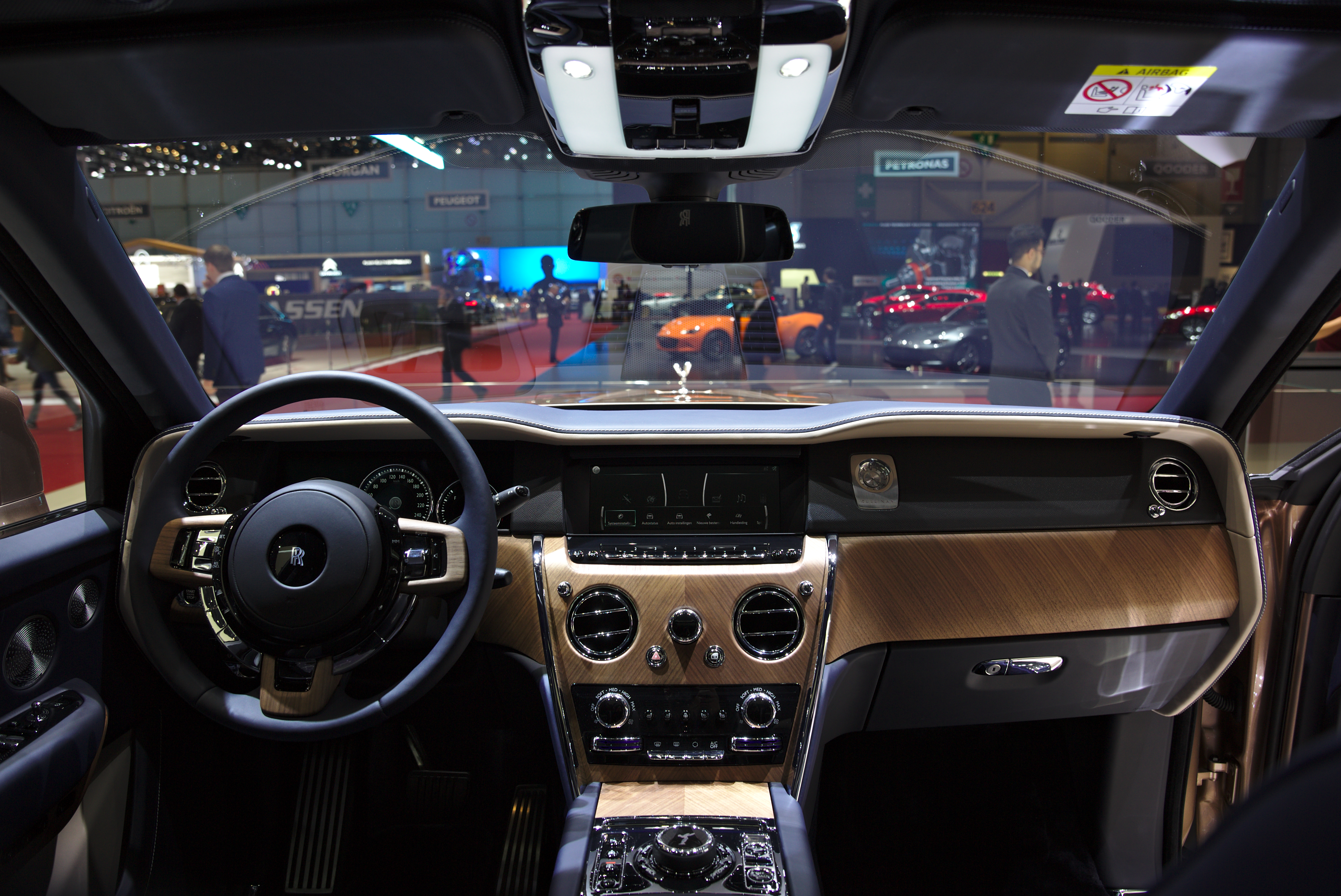
Front interior

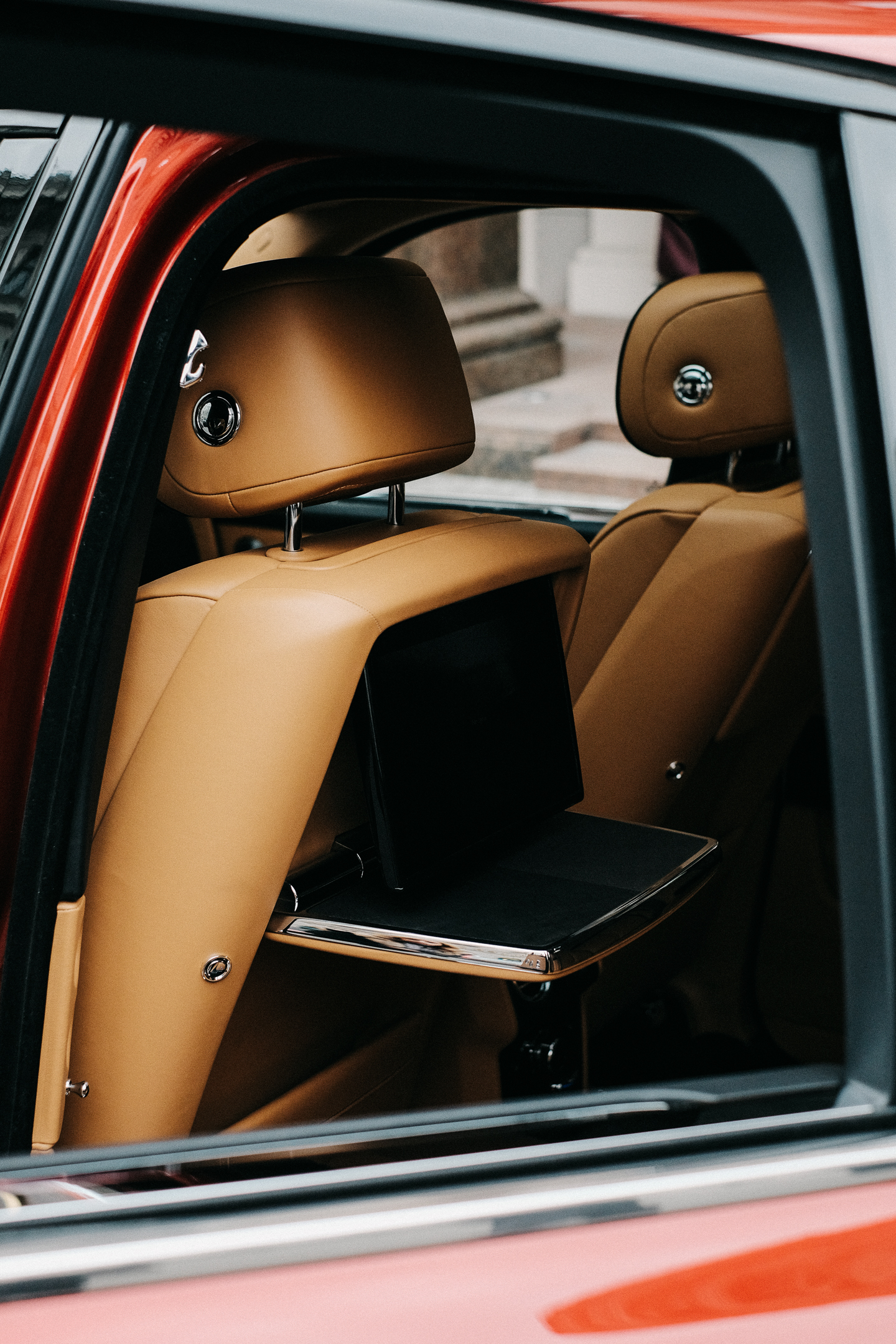
Rear passenger compartment

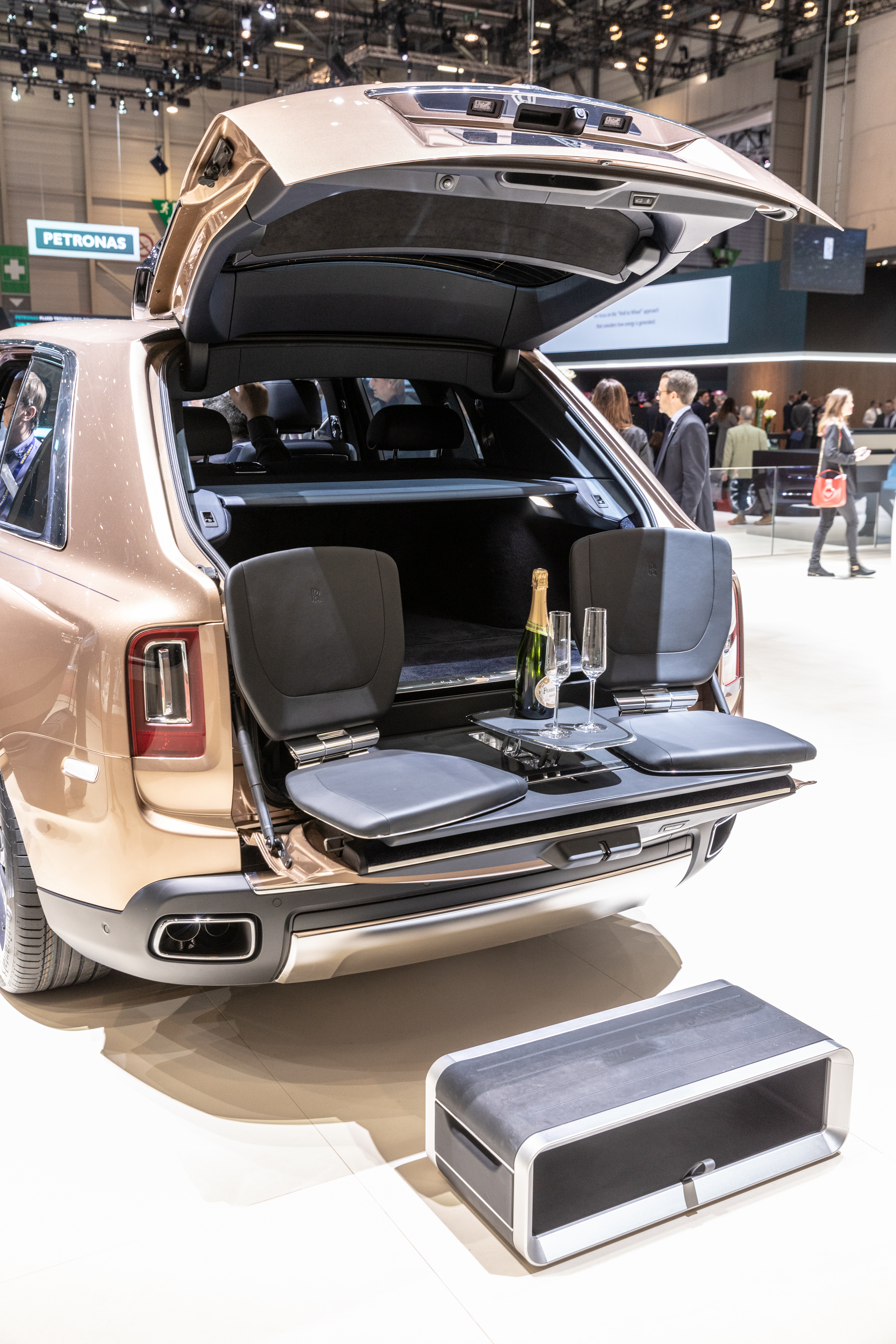
Camping seats in the boot

== Specifications and performance ==
=== Platform ===
The Cullinan uses an aluminium spaceframe chassis; this is a version of Rolls-Royce's modular "Architecture of Luxury" platform. This platform made its debut in the Phantom VIII.

=== Suspension ===
The Cullinan uses a double wishbone front axle and a 5-link rear axle. It is fitted with self-levelling air suspension and electronically controlled dampers front and rear. It is also equipped with electrically actuated active anti-roll bars. The Cullinan features several driving modes, including an off-road mode which uses a dynamic suspension system that raises its height by 40 mm.

The Cullinan is also fitted with a stereo camera integrated into the front windscreen that scans the road ahead and adjusts the suspension proactively to improve ride quality. This system, dubbed "The Flagbearer" by Rolls-Royce, operates at speeds of up to 100 km/h (62 mph).

Like the Phantom VIII, the Cullinan employs a four-wheel steering system to improve both maneuverability at low speeds and stability at higher speeds.

=== Powertrain ===
The Cullinan is only equipped with a twin-turbocharged 6.75-litre V12 engine. ZF's 8HP 8-speed automatic transmission is the Cullinan's sole gearbox option. The Cullinan uses a permanent all-wheel drive system.

Performance data
| Model | Engine type | Displacement | Power | Torque | Top speed |
|---|---|---|---|---|---|
| Cullinan | Twin-turbocharged V12 | 6.75 L (412 cu in) | 571 PS; 563 hp (420 kW) @ 5,000 rpm | 850 N⋅m (627 lb⋅ft) @ 1,600 rpm | 250 km/h (155 mph) |
| Cullinan Black Badge | Twin-turbocharged V12 | 6.75 L (412 cu in) | 600 PS; 591 hp (441 kW) @ 5,000 rpm | 900 N⋅m (664 lb⋅ft) @ 1,600 rpm | 250 km/h (155 mph) |

== Variants ==
=== Black Badge Cullinan ===
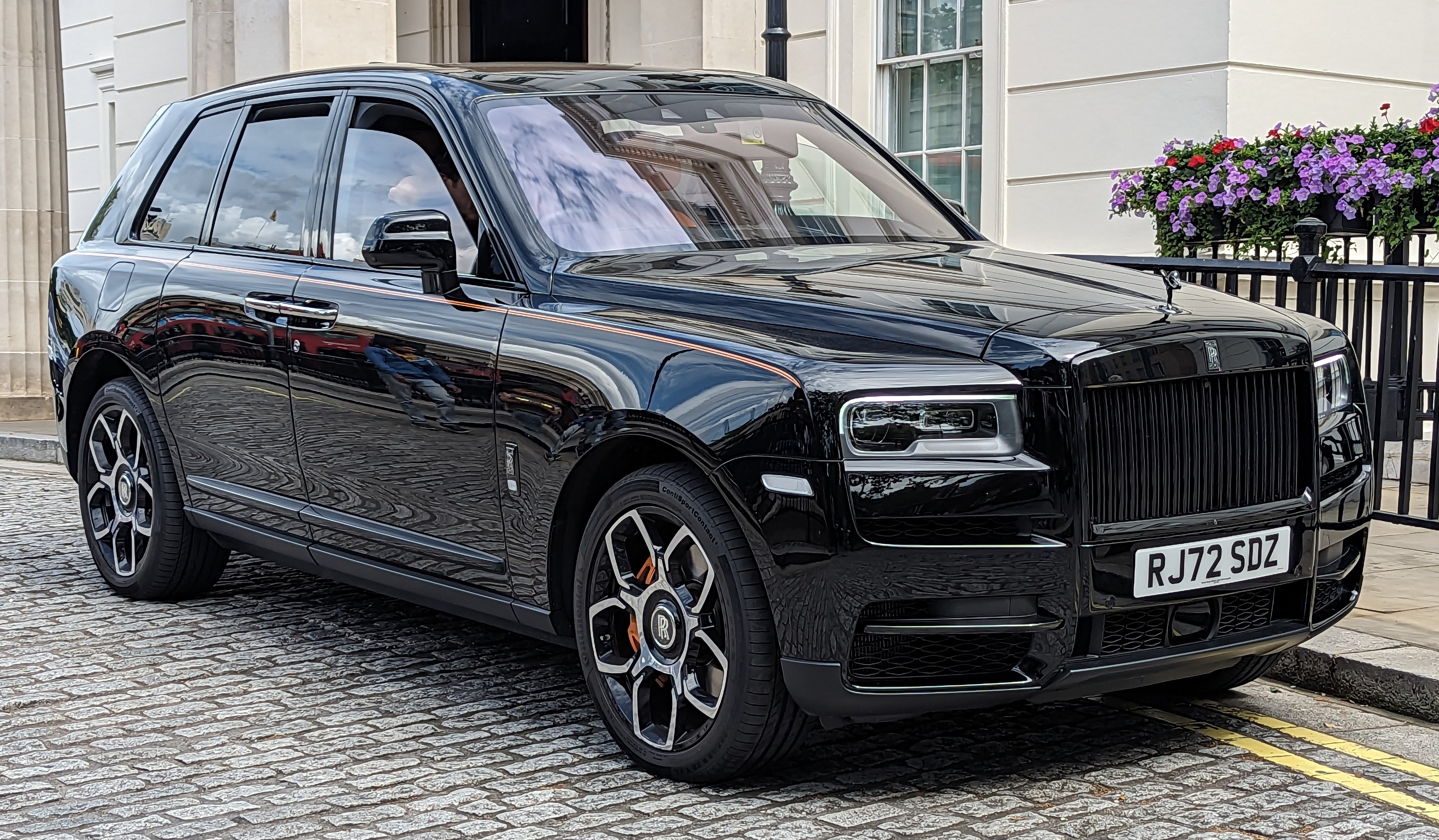
Rolls-Royce Cullinan Black Badge

The Black Badge is a special edition of the Cullinan which features a power increase to 600 PS; 591 hp (441 kW), as well as exterior features painted in black (including the Spirit of Ecstasy) and carbon fibre trim on the interior. The leather used in the interior is black, with borders coloured according to the exterior.

The current production car with the Rolls-Royce Black Badge marque along with this car is the Rolls-Royce Ghost Black Badge.

== Other special editions ==
=== Black Badge Cullinan Blue Shadow ===
The Blue Shadow is a special edition of the Black Badge Cullinan inspired by the Kármán line, featuring leather seats with perforations arranged in patterns that replicate how the earth looks from space, an embroidered roof lining that depicts the moon, and a revised version of the starlight headliner found in the standard Cullinan with both white and blue lights. It also features exterior changes such as a special blue paintwork and blue tinted Spirit of Ectasy. Rolls-Royce say only 62 examples were built.

== Series II ==
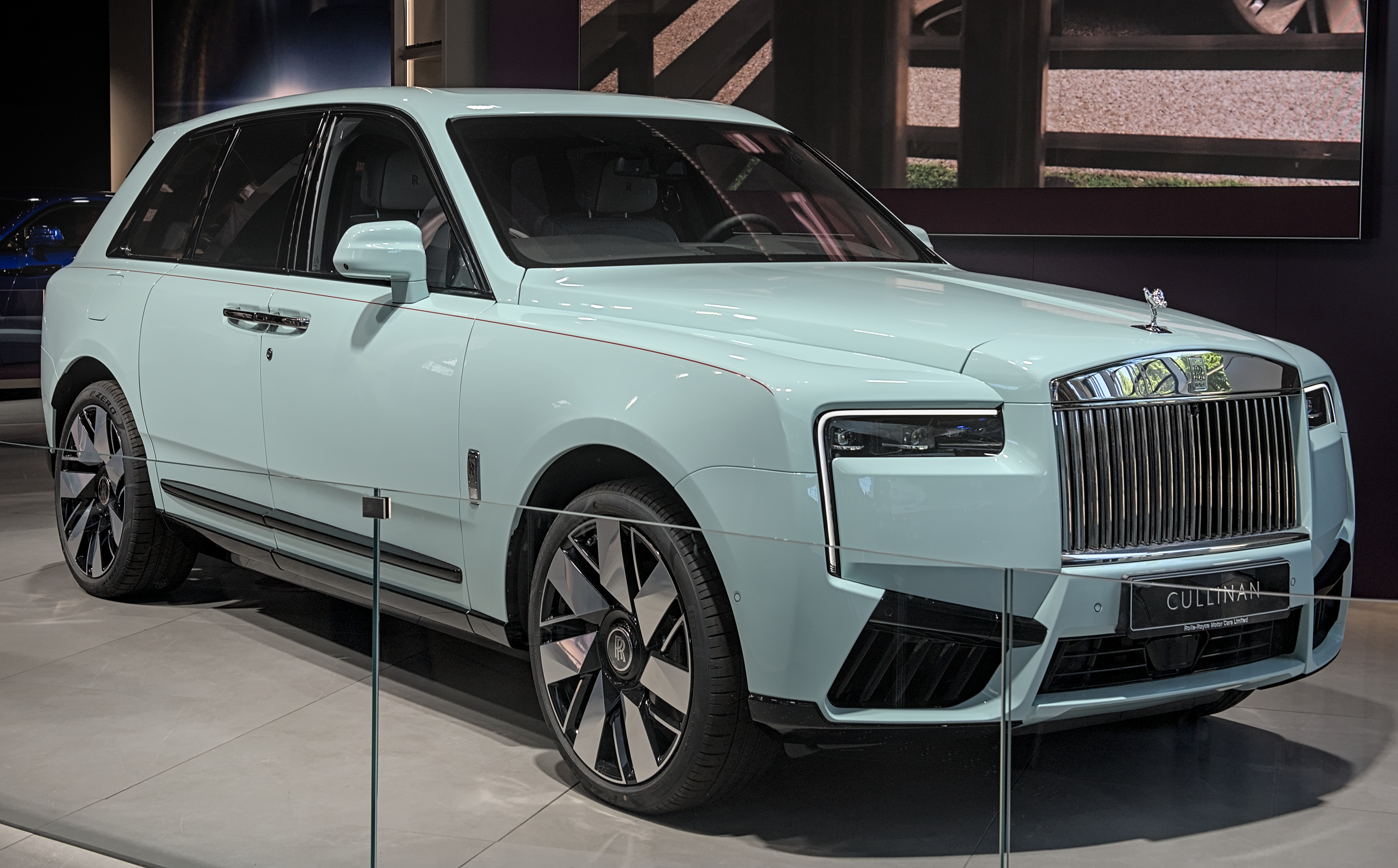
Rolls-Royce Cullinan Series II

The Series II, released in 2024, features no changes to the powertrain but features revised styling, including a new front bumper, headlights, an illuminated grille, and larger 23-inch wheels. On the interior, the Series II features new interior materials, broader customisation options, and an updated tech suite that includes a new digital gauge cluster and infotainment system.

== See also ==
- Mercedes-Maybach GLS 600
- Bentley Bentayga
