= Rolls-Royce Silent Shadow =

Car model

Overview
- Manufacturer: Rolls-Royce Motor Cars
- Production: Not available
- Assembly: United Kingdom: West Sussex, England (Goodwood plant)

Body and chassis
- Body style: 4-door saloon
- Layout: Rear-motor, rear-wheel drive; Dual-motor all-wheel drive (xDrive)
- Doors: Conventional doors (front) / Coach doors (rear)
- Related: Rolls-Royce Phantom (seventh generation)

Powertrain
- Electric motor: 3-phase synchronous motor
- Transmission: Single-speed with fixed ratio
- Battery: 120 kWh lithium-ion

Chronology
- Predecessor: Rolls-Royce Silver Shadow (Shadow name)

The Rolls-Royce Silent Shadow is a full-size luxury car manufactured by Rolls-Royce Motor Cars. It is intended to be one of company's few upcoming electric vehicles. Although the exact date of the car is yet to be announced.

== Overview ==
The Silent Shadow is prefigured by the Rolls-Royce 103EX Concept car, which was presented in 2016 on the occasion of the centenary of the parent company BMW. On 31 May 2021, Rolls-Royce Motor Cars announced the name of one of their electric vehicles in history. The Silent Shadow is named after the Rolls-Royce Silver Shadow which was produced between 1965 and 1980.
