= Rolls-Royce Phantom =

Ultra-luxury flagship automobiles

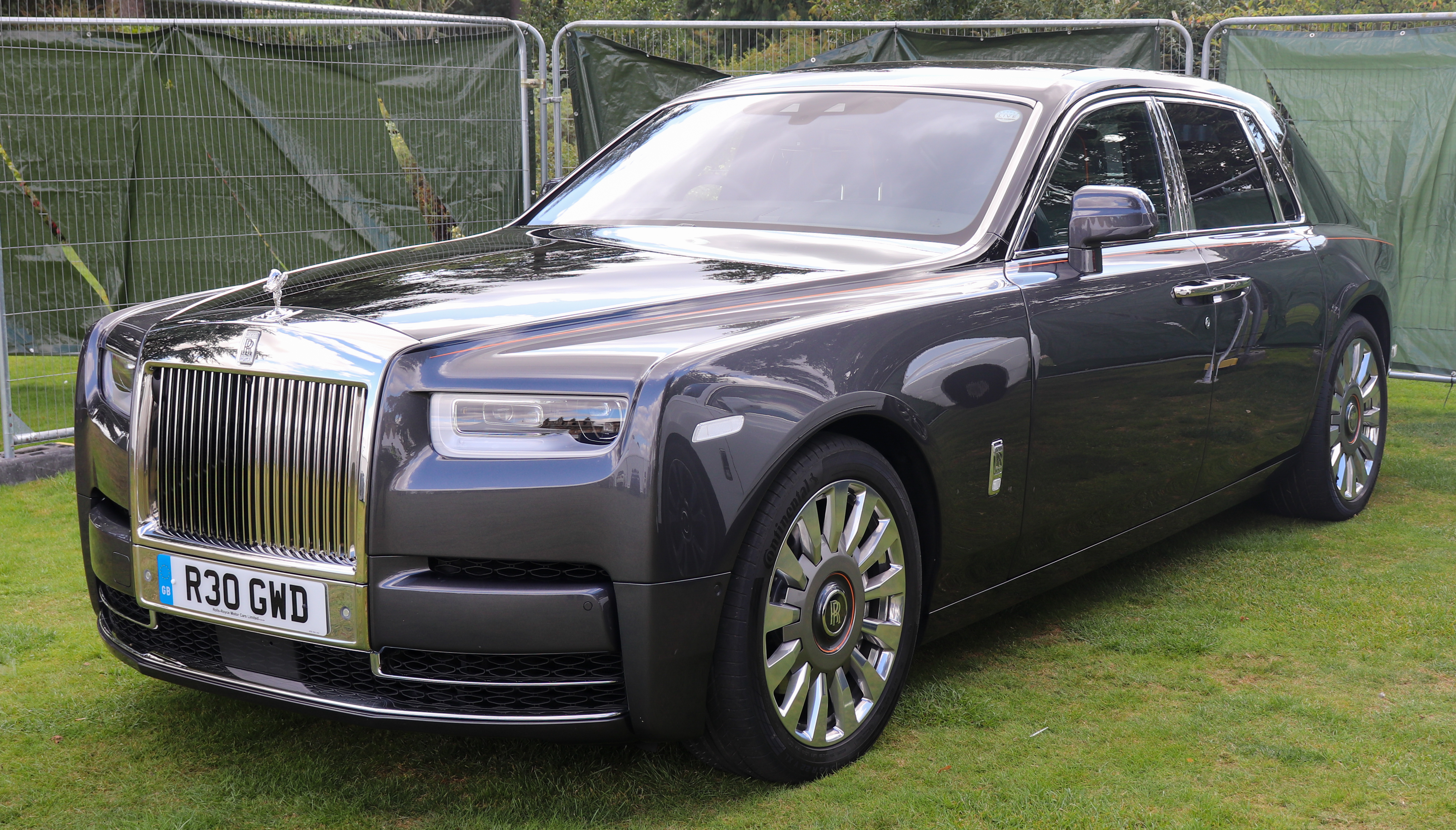
- Rolls Royce Phantom VIII

Overview
- Manufacturer: Rolls-Royce
- Production: 1925 to present
- Assembly: United Kingdom

Body and chassis
- Layout: FR layout

Automaker Rolls-Royce has used the Phantom name on full-sized luxury cars and limousines since 1925, making it the longest-used car model nameplate in automotive history.

In the 20th century, the Rolls-Royce Phantom was a very low volume, hand-built limousine, which in its first four generations was custom coachbuilt to the customer's requests, and sometimes extravagant desires. Whilst automobile manufacturing over time became more mechanised and prolific, and vehicles from other manufacturers could be built in greater numbers and at lower prices, the Phantoms remained hand-built, and production of individual cars only began once the order was placed. The use of the name "Phantom" is a long tradition of naming Rolls-Royce models after "ghosts" or spirits.

Initial generations of Rolls-Royce consisted of the chassis and engine, then arrangements were made to manufacture the body and interior, customised to the buyer's requests. The Phantom series has maintained favour with wealthy business people, celebrities, heads of state, and royalty, for its qualities, including large interior space, exclusivity, and presence.

During the years 1931-1998, when Rolls-Royce also manufactured Bentley cars, the Phantom was exclusive to Rolls-Royce and the approach to the most opulent models wasn't shared with Bentley. Before then, Bentley was an independent automaker who did produce, on a limited basis, the Bentley 8 Litre limousine, until Rolls-Royce took ownership and discontinued the 8 Litre Bentley flagship. Bentley would not manufacture a limousine until 2002, when the Bentley State Limousine was presented to Queen Elizabeth II.

== List of generations ==
- Rolls-Royce Phantom I, 1925–1931
- Rolls-Royce Phantom II, 1929–1935
- Rolls-Royce Phantom III, 1936–1939
- Rolls-Royce Phantom IV, 1950–1956
- Rolls-Royce Phantom V, 1959–1968
- Rolls-Royce Phantom VI, 1968–1990
- Rolls-Royce Phantom VII, 2003–2017
  - Rolls-Royce Phantom Drophead Coupé, 2007–2017
  - Rolls-Royce Phantom Coupé, 2008–2017
- Rolls-Royce Phantom VIII, 2017–present

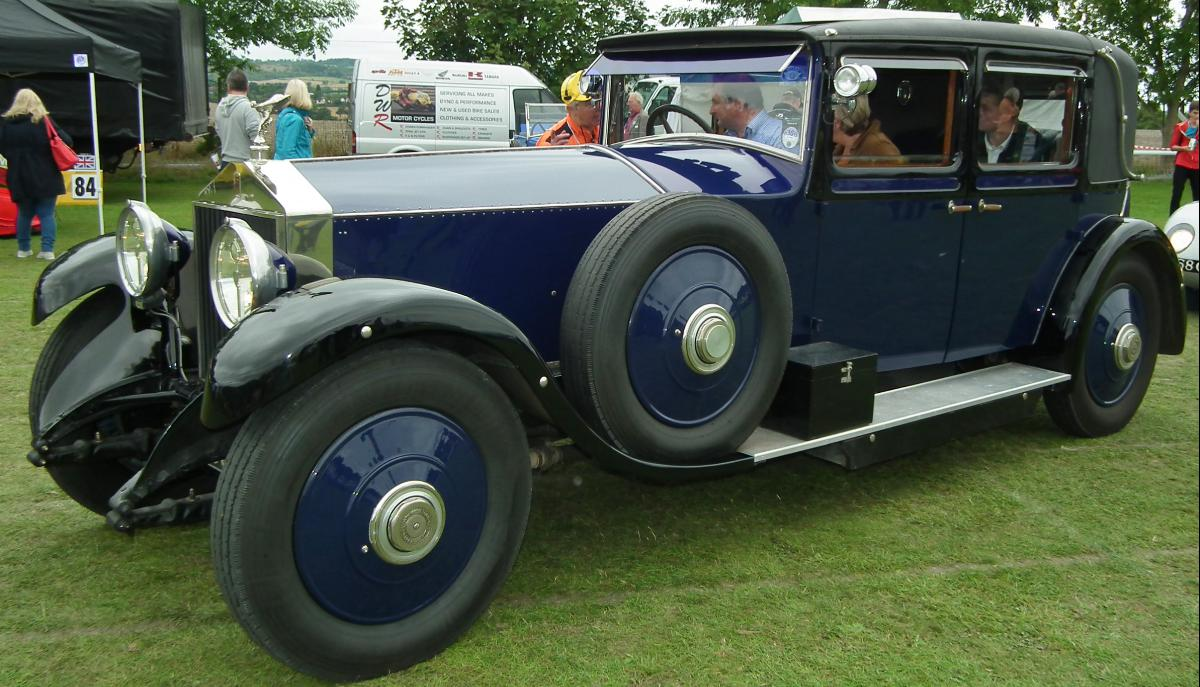
Rolls-Royce Phantom I

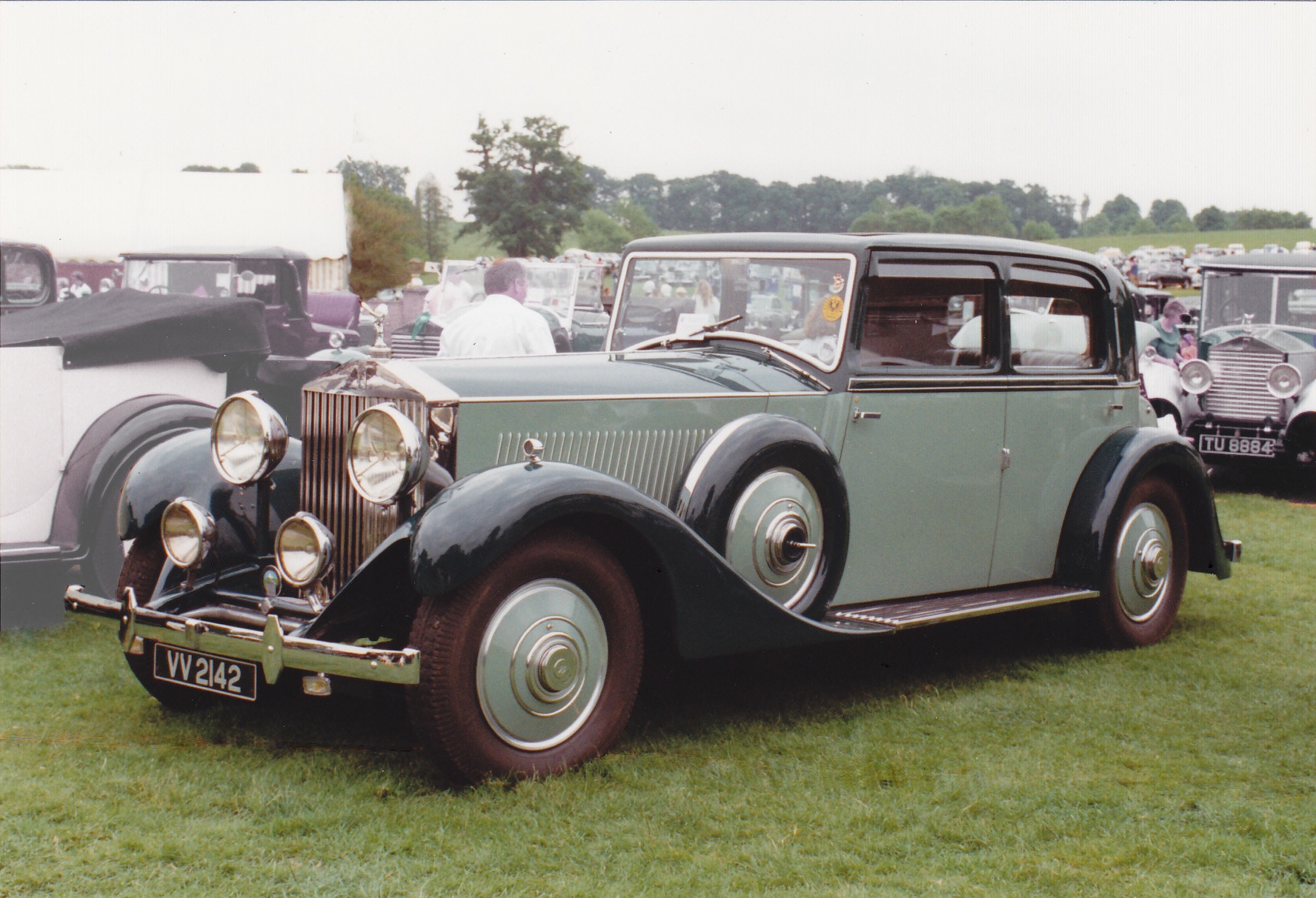
Rolls-Royce Phantom II

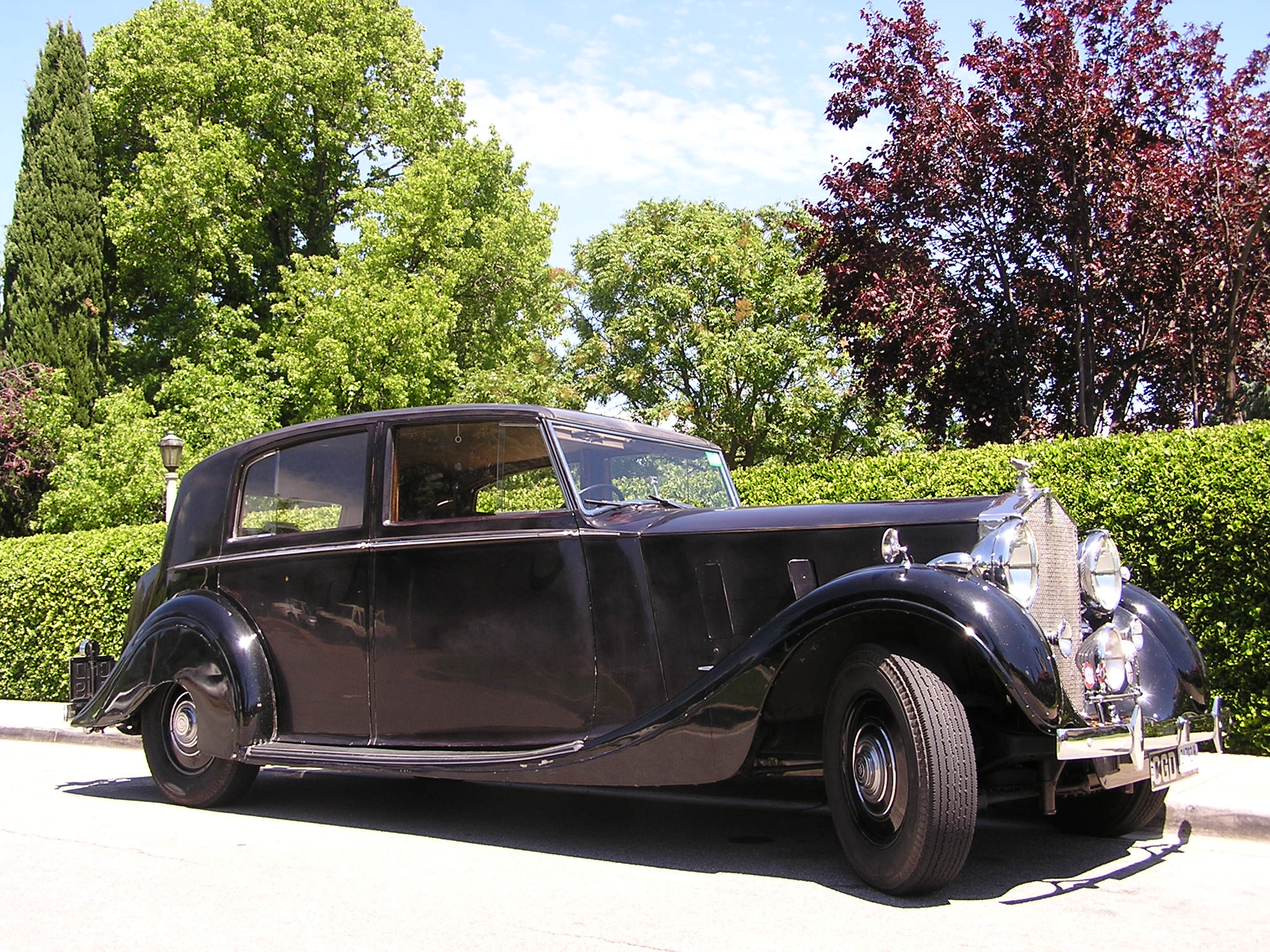
Rolls-Royce Phantom III from circa 1936

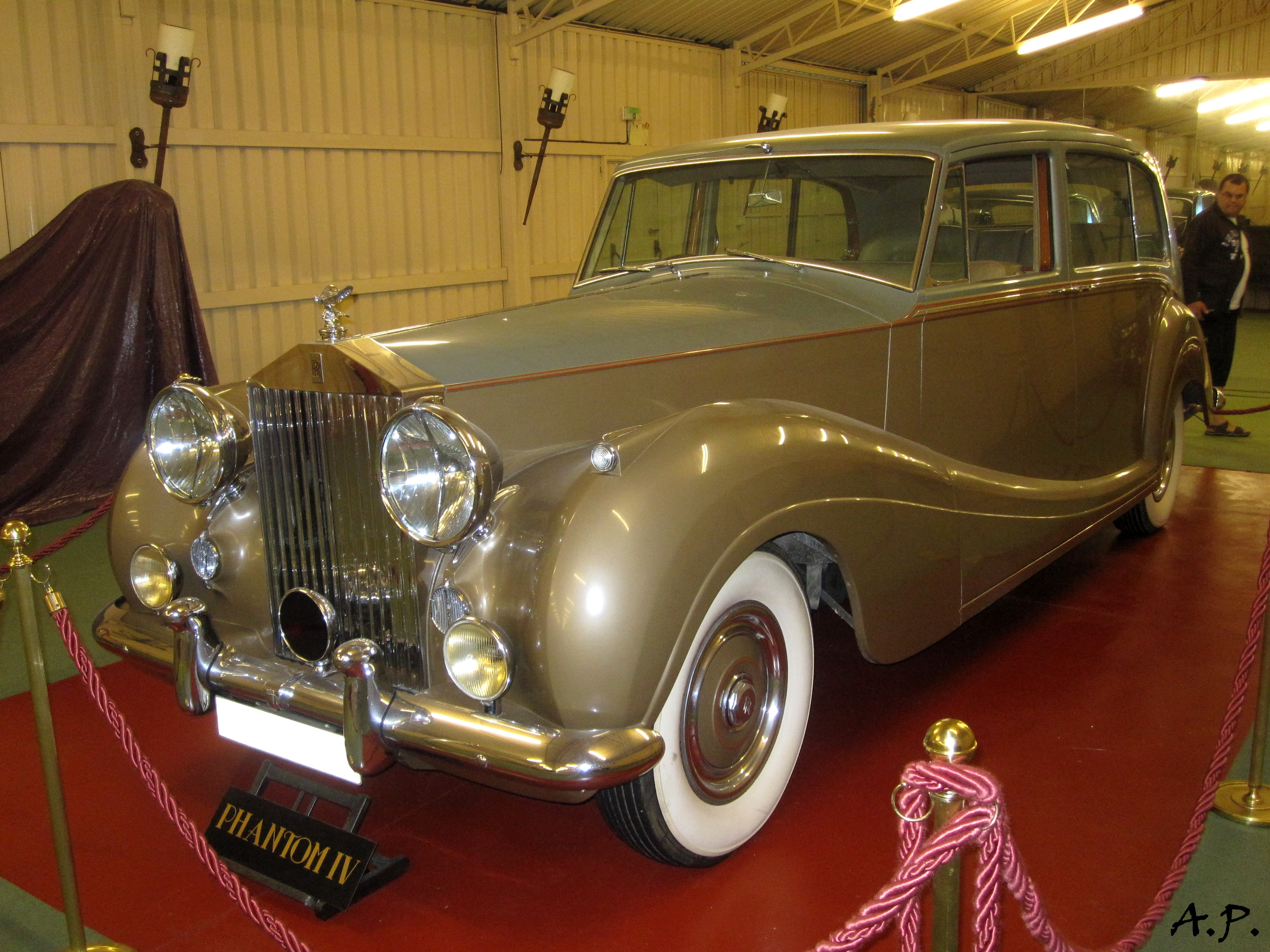
Rolls-Royce Phantom IV

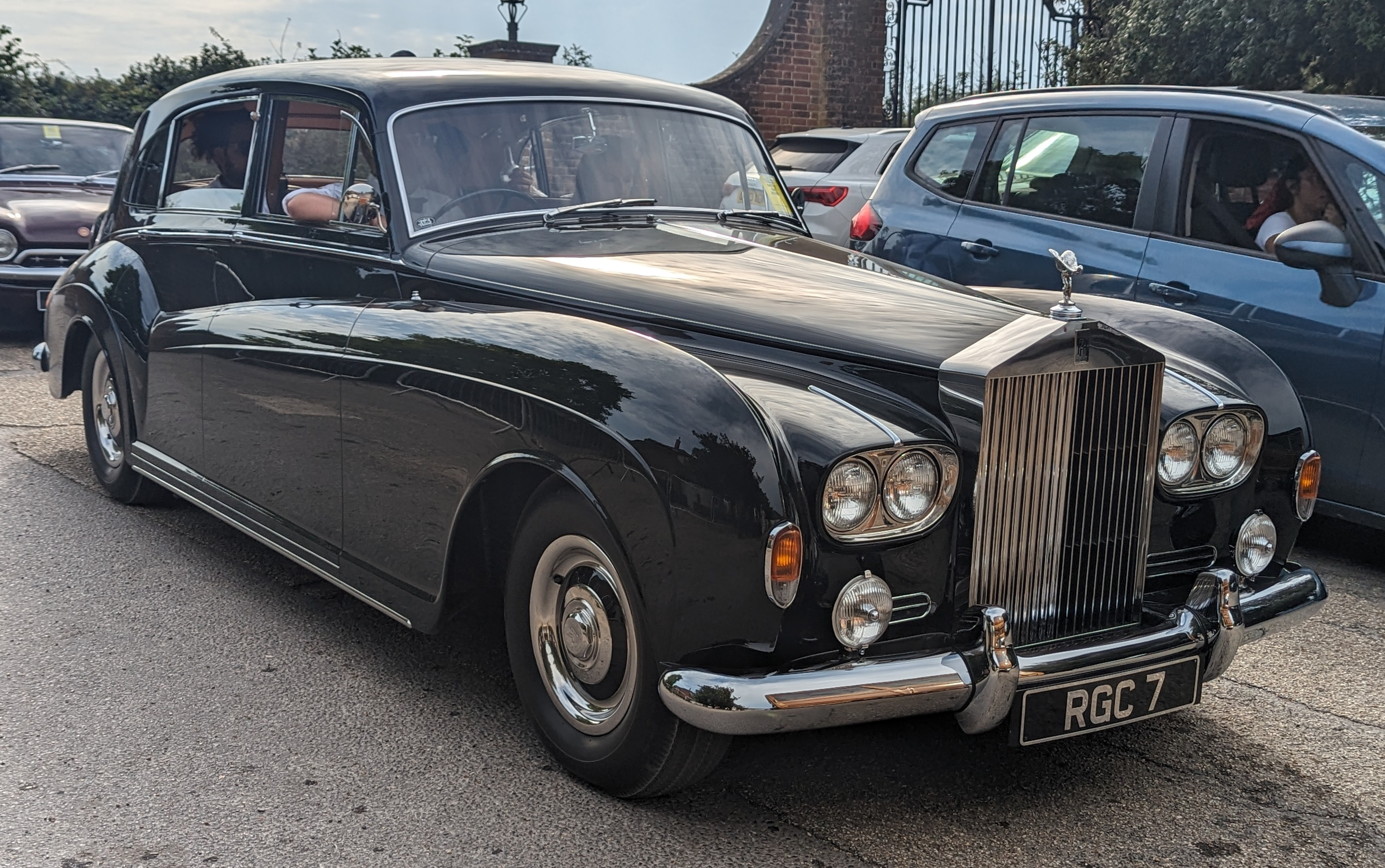
Rolls-Royce Phantom V

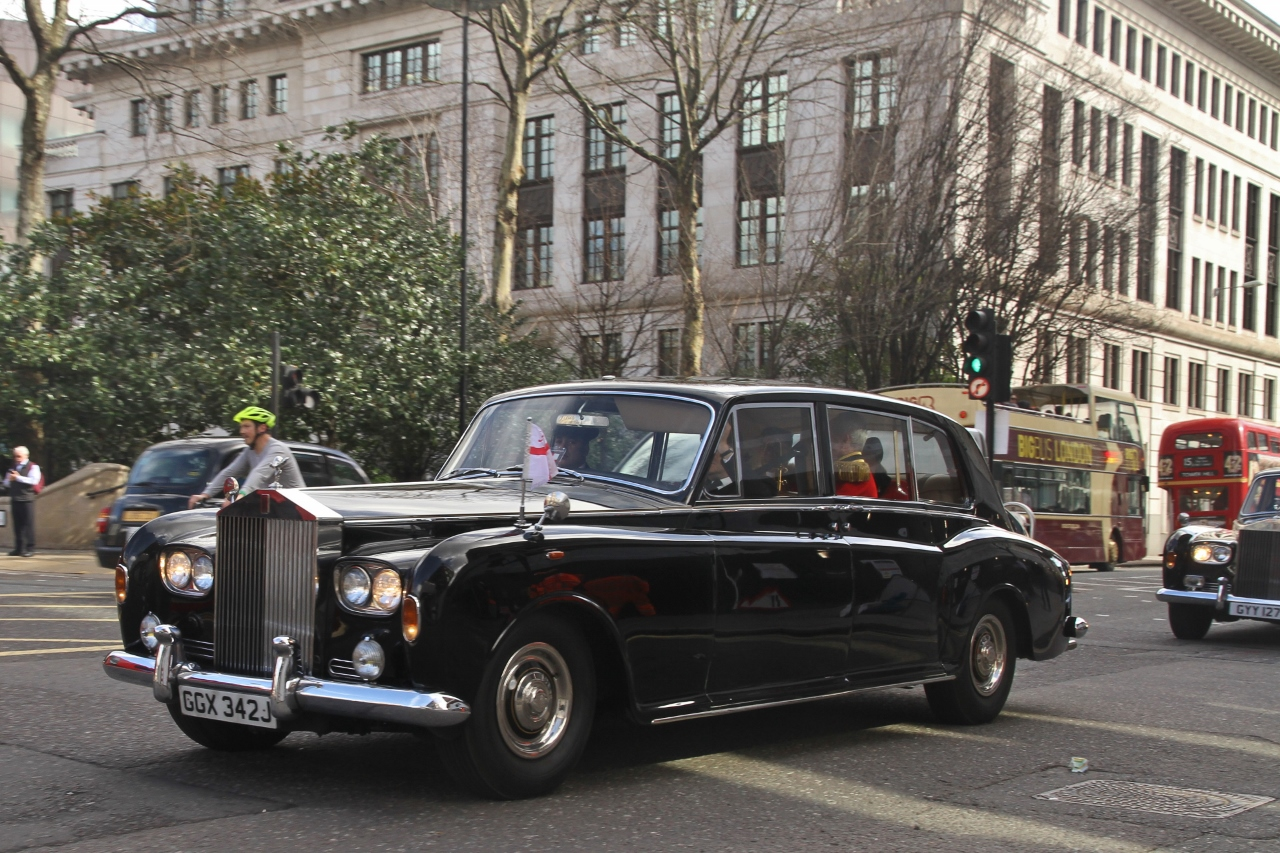
Rolls-Royce Phantom VI

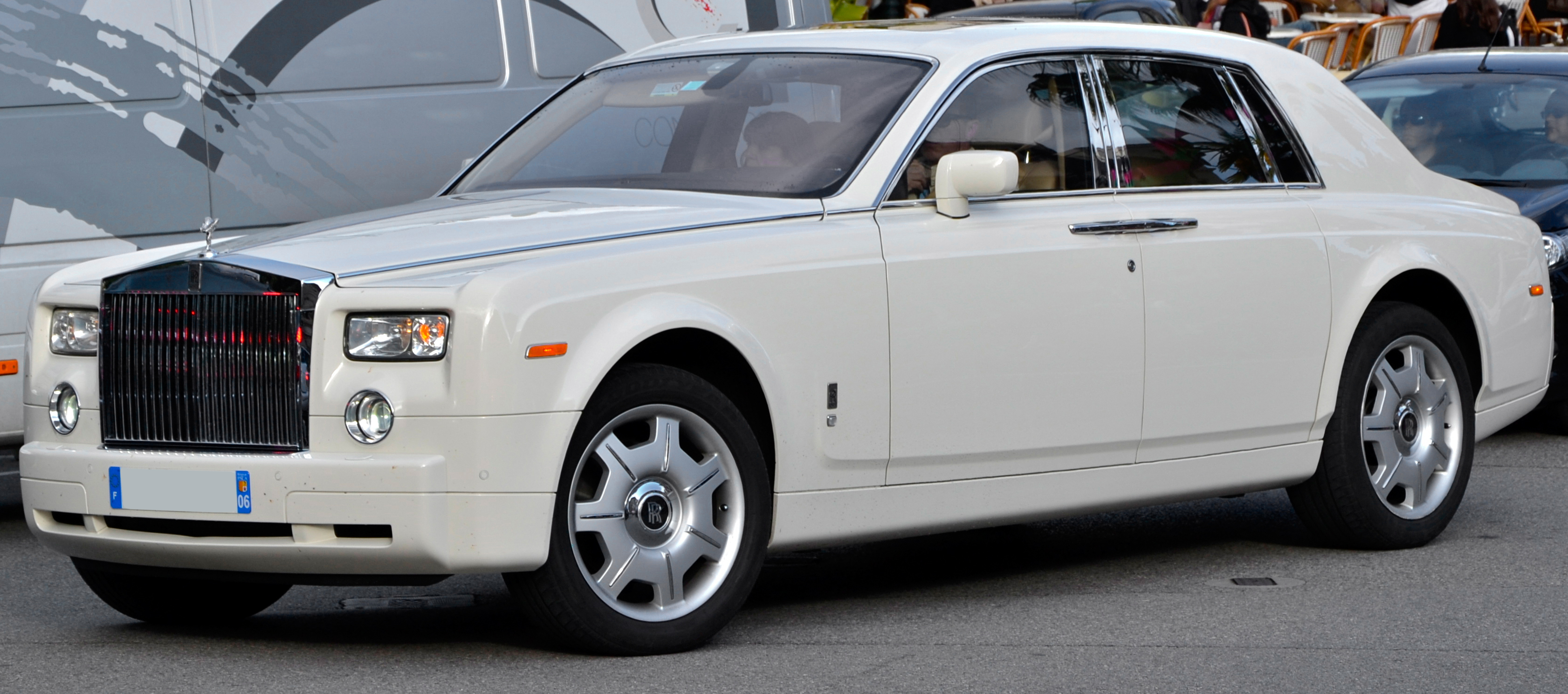
Rolls-Royce Phantom VII

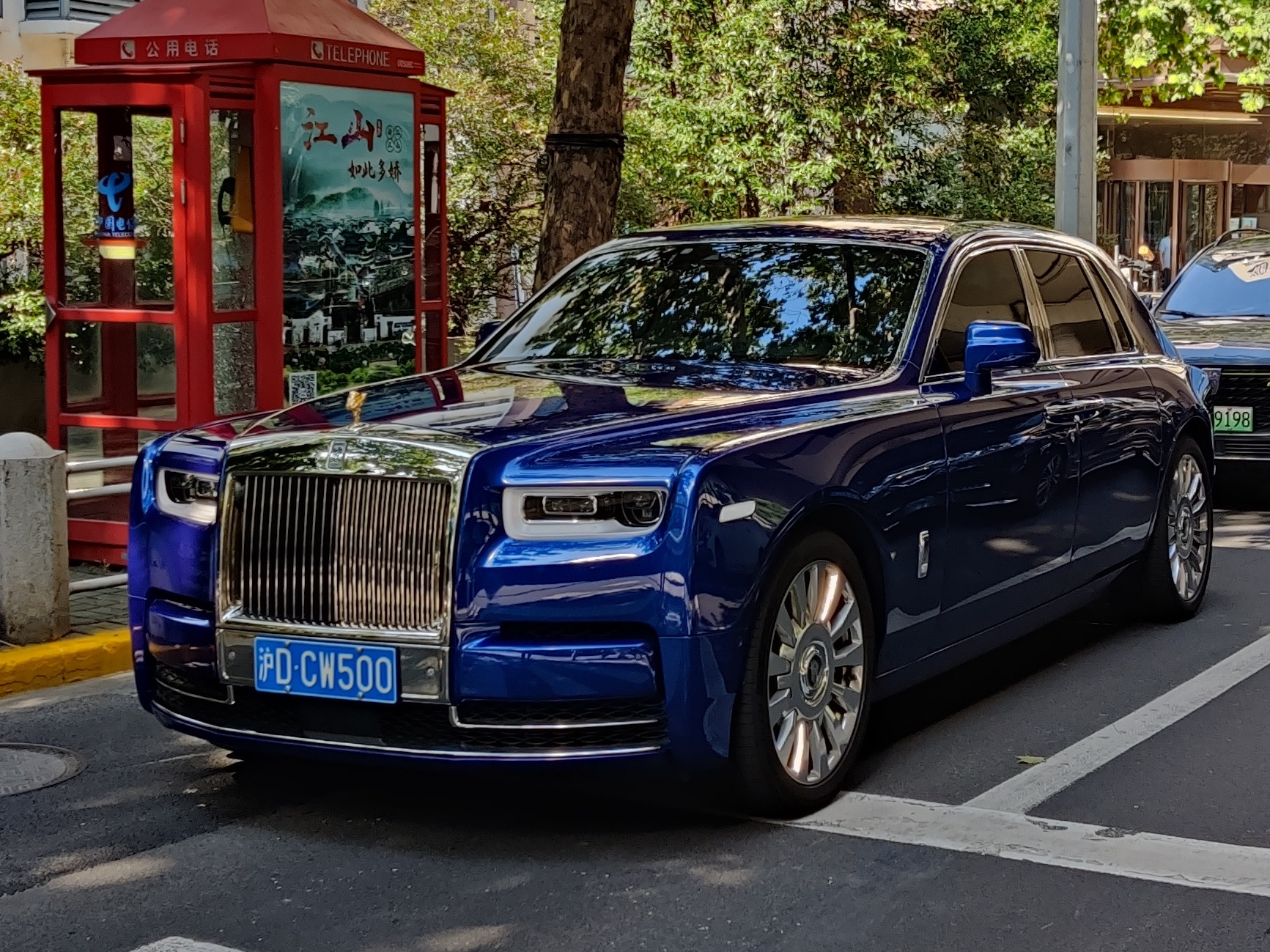
Rolls-Royce Phantom VIII

== See also ==
- List of Rolls-Royce motor cars
- Spirit of Ecstasy
