= Marek Djordjevic =

Serbian automobile designer

Marek Djordjevic (Serbian Cyrillic: Марек Ђорђевић; born 1969) is a Serbian automobile-designer known for the Rolls-Royce Phantom VII luxury car.

== Background ==
Djordjevic was born in Belgrade, Serbia. He studied at the Art Center College of Design in Pasadena, California where he now lectures as an adjunct professor.

== Career ==
Djordjevic worked at Rolls-Royce for six years. He was the company's head of exterior design and also creative director for the USA Design works studio in California. While there, he worked on the Mini, MG, and Land Rover vehicles, during the time Rover Group was owned by British Aerospace PLC. He was also involved in the design of the Phantom Drophead Coupé and the Phantom Coupé, as well as the experimental Rolls-Royce 100EX, named best luxury car ever by Esquire magazine.

In 2003, Djordjevic designed the exterior of the Rolls-Royce Phantom VII, a luxury model which helped revive the Rolls-Royce brand. The car was built from scratch and according to Djordjevic, " It was one of the most streamlined design programs I’ve ever experienced. " He stresses that proportions were an important element in the overall design, as well re-interpreting traditional elements in a modern way. Djordjevic also contributed to the marketing aspects and product planning of the Phantom VII.

Djordjevic left Rolls-Royce in 2005, to start his own namesake firm in Los Angeles, where he focuses on premium land, sea, and air vehicles.
