= Rolls-Royce Project Nightingale =

Overview
- Manufacturer: Rolls-Royce Motor Cars
- Production: Upcoming
- Assembly: Goodwood Plant, West Sussex, England

Body and chassis
- Class: Full-size ultra-luxury coach build
- Platform: Architecture of Luxury platform
- Related: Rolls-Royce Spectre

Dimensions
- Length: 5,760 mm (226.8 in)

The Rolls-Royce Project Nightingale is an upcoming series of full-sized luxury coach built cars produced by Rolls-Royce Motor Cars. It was unveiled in April 2026. 100 vehicles are set to be produced.

== History ==
Project Nightingale was unveiled on 14 April 2026 as the first series of models in the new Coachbuild Collection. The name "nightingale" is translated from the French word "Le Rossignol", also referring to a house in Henry Royce's winter estate on the French Riviera.
