= Rolls-Royce Sweptail =

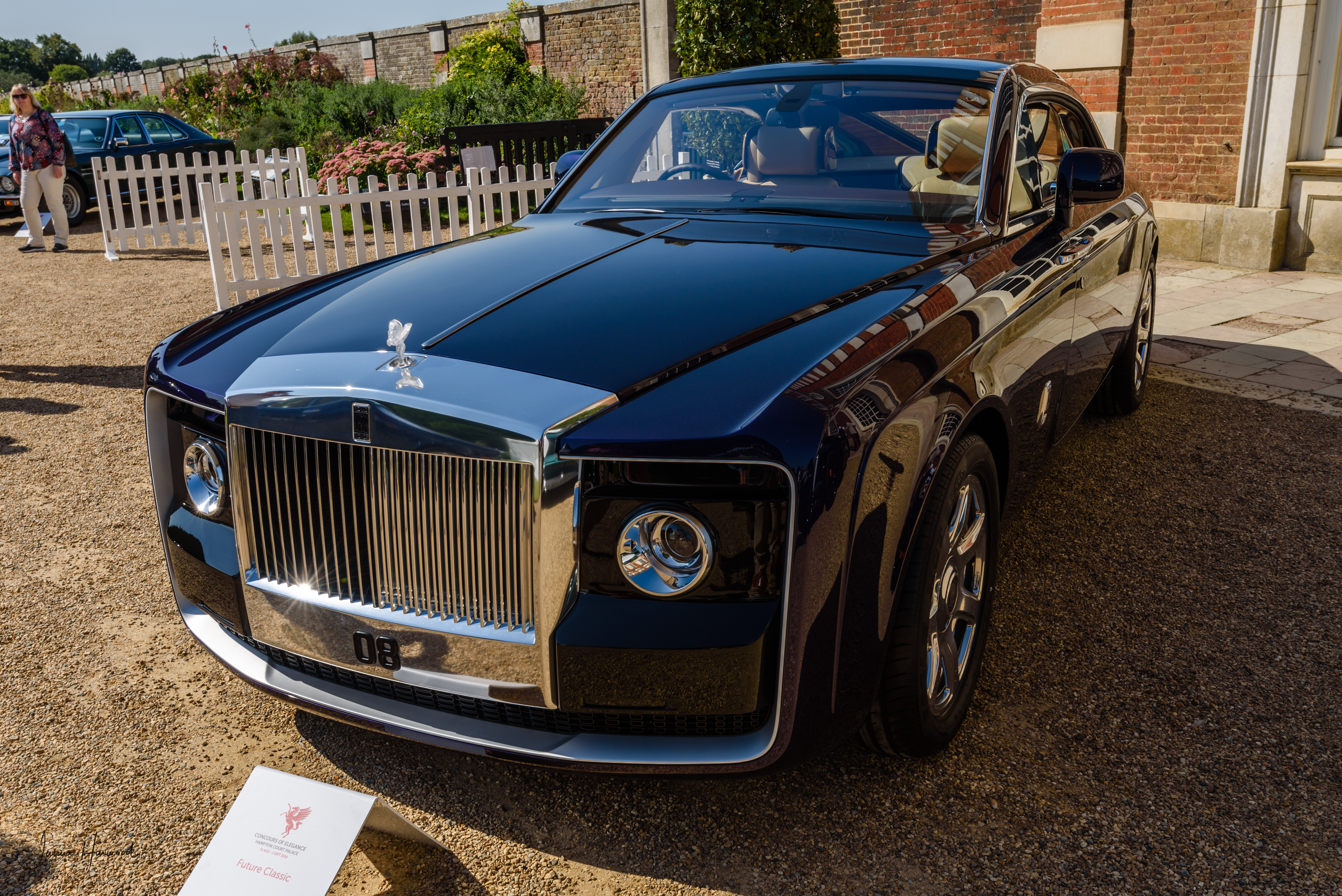
- Rolls-Royce Sweptail on display

Overview
- Manufacturer: Rolls-Royce Motor Cars
- Production: 2017
- Model years: 2018
- Assembly: Goodwood plant, Chichester, West Sussex, England
- Designer: Alex Innes

Body and chassis
- Class: Full-size luxury car/grand tourer (GT)
- Body style: 2-door coupé
- Layout: FR layout
- Doors: Suicide doors
- Related: Rolls-Royce Phantom VII

Powertrain
- Engine: 6.75 L V12
- Power output: 338 kW (453 bhp)
- Transmission: ZF 8-speed automatic

The Rolls-Royce Sweptail is a one-off coachbuilt luxury car made by Rolls-Royce Motor for a private client. it was unveiled in May 2017 at Concorso d'Eleganza Villa d'Este in Italy. The design draws inspiration from classic Rolls-Royce models and from the clients interest in yachts.

== Overview ==
The Sweptail is based on the Rolls-Royce Phantom Coupé and hand-built over four years. Inspired by coachbuilding of the 1920s and 1930s, the car was commissioned in 2013, by a super-yacht and aircraft specialist.

At the time of its May 2017 debut at the yearly Concorso d'Eleganza Villa d'Este, it was the most expensive new automobile in the world, costing around £10 million.

The Sweptail is owned by Hong Kong–based customer Sam Li, son of billionaire real estate mogul Samuel Tak Lee.

Giles Taylor, former director of design at Rolls-Royce Motor Cars described the vehicle as "the automotive equivalent of Haute couture".

In 2019, it was overtaken as the most expensive new car by the Bugatti La Voiture Noire which sold for US$18.7 million (US$12.3 million pretax).

== Gallery ==
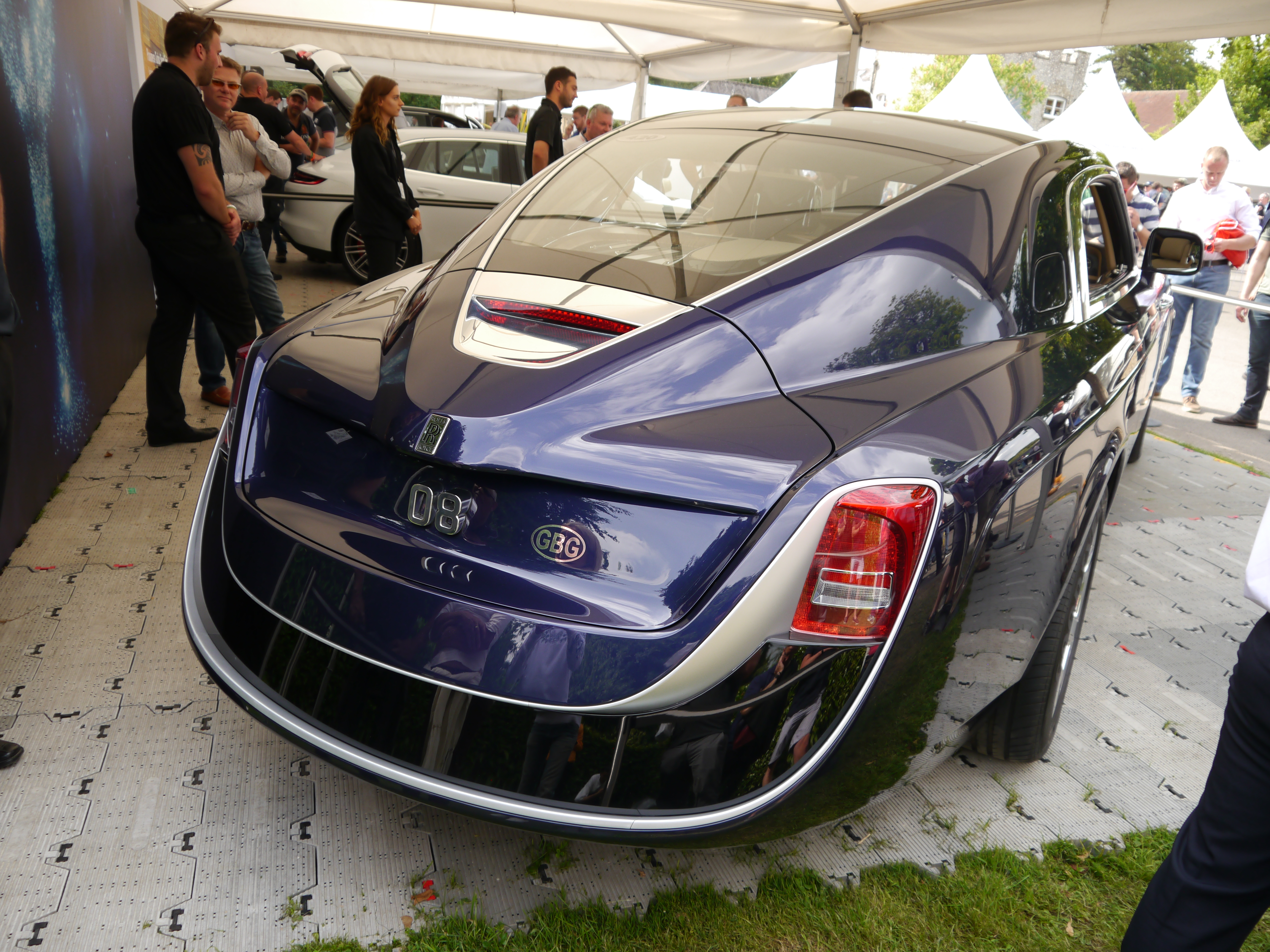

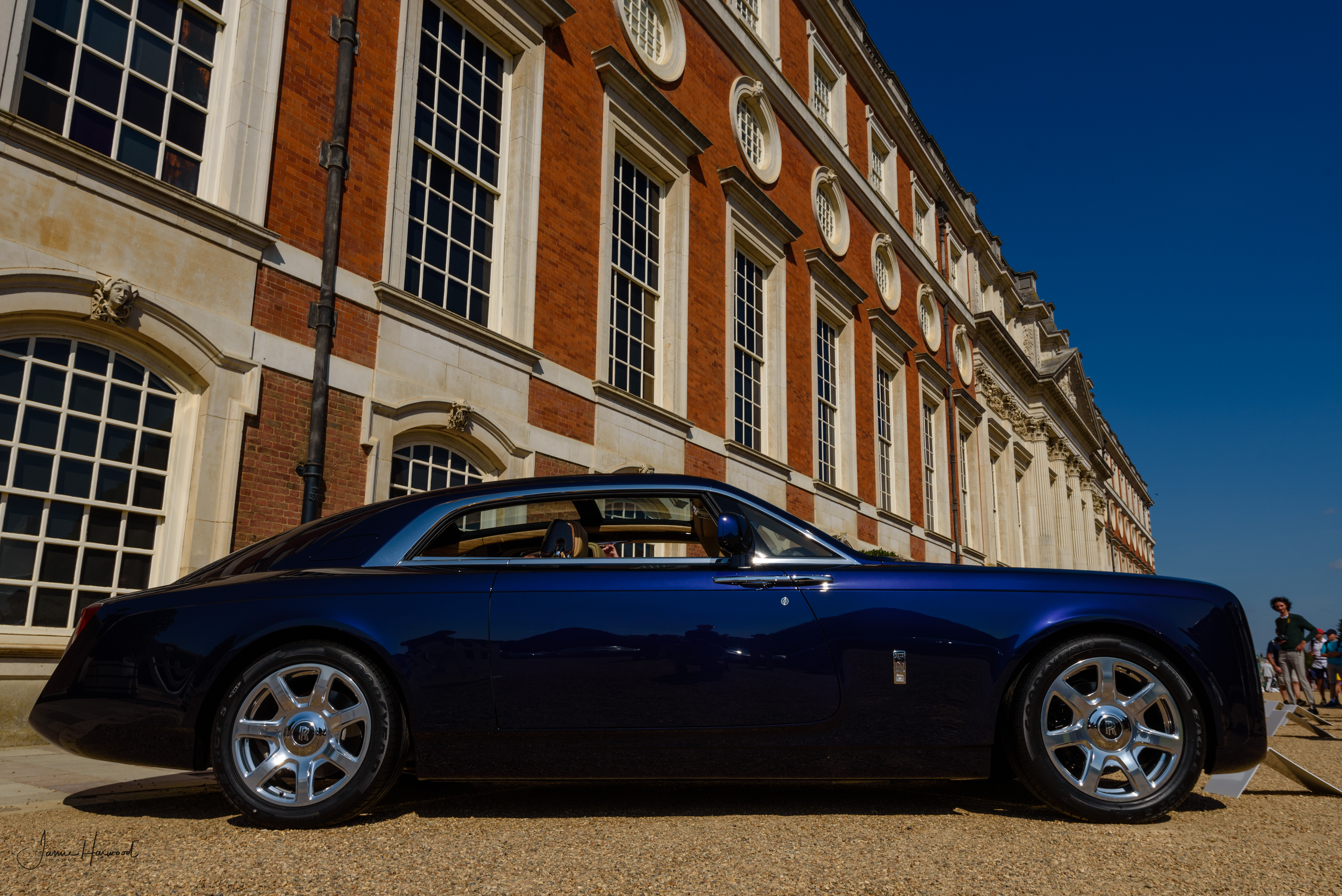

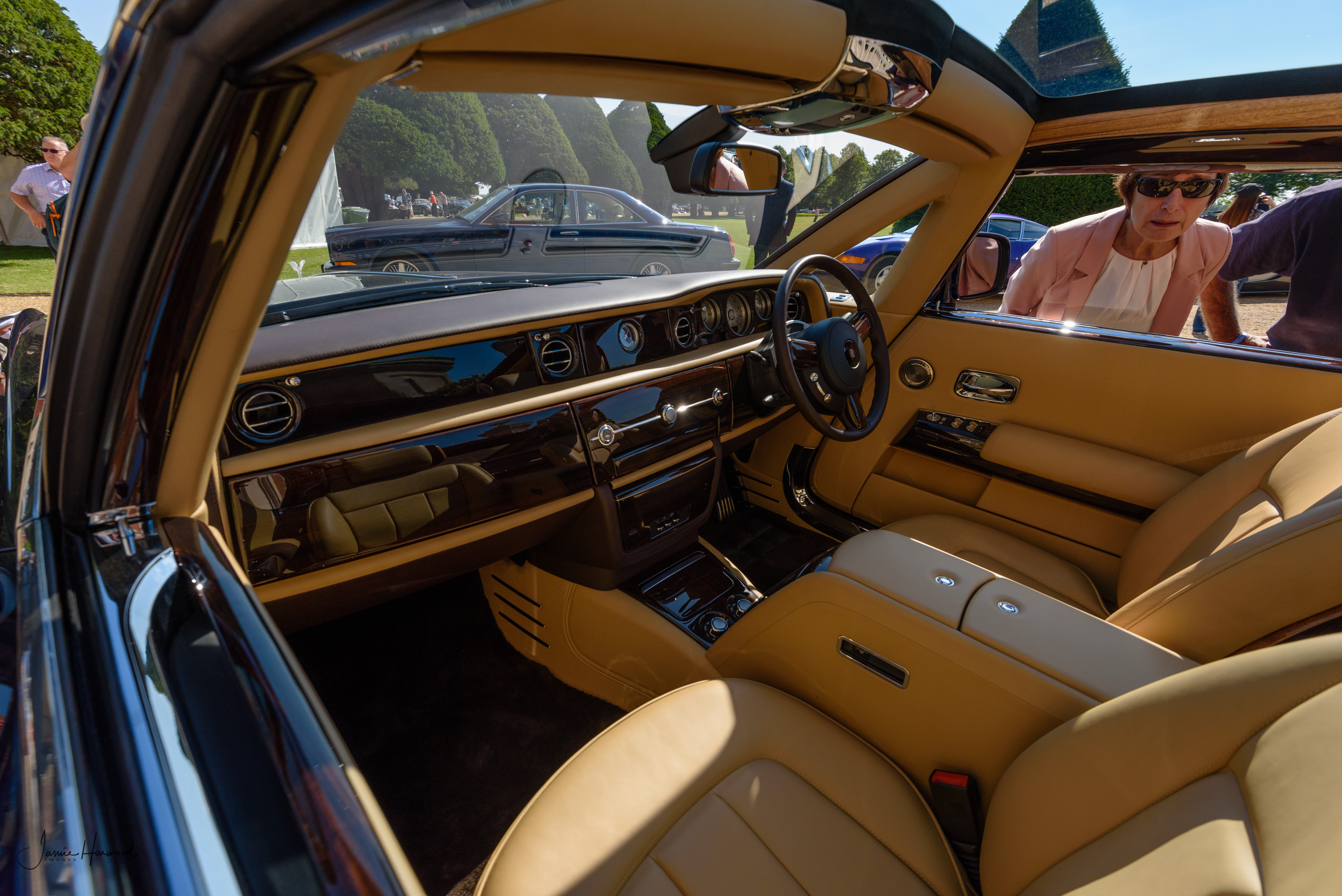
