= Ian Cameron (car designer) =

British car designer (1950–2024)

Ian Cameron (26 March 1950 – 12 July 2024) was a British car designer, most notable for his time with Rolls Royce following its purchase by BMW.

== Career ==
Cameron was born on 26 March 1950. He graduated from the Royal College of Art in 1975, and started his career with Pininfarina. In 1981 he moved to Iveco reaching the position of Chief Designer.

He moved to BMW in 1992 as Exterior Design Studio Manager, and in 1999 he was appointed director of design at Rolls-Royce. Cameron designed the Rolls-Royce’s winged silver lady statuette to disappear into the bonnet with a loud clunk if it was vandalised.

He retired in 2012 and after a period as Brand Ambassador for Rolls-Royce Heritage, he set up a design consultancy Ian Cameron Design Partners.

=== Significant designs ===
- BMW 3 Series (E46), external design
- BMW Z8, external design
- Rolls Royce Phantom, design team lead
- Rolls Royce Ghost, design team lead

== Personal life and death ==
Cameron was married to Verena Kloos, formerly BMW’s Designworks studio president in California. They lived in Bavaria, Germany until his death. Cameron was murdered after being stabbed at his front door in Herrsching am Ammersee on 12 July 2024. He was 74.

The murderer, who had tried robbery, was sentenced to life imprisonment on 1 August 2025.
