= Rolls-Royce 100EX =

Rolls-Royce 101EX
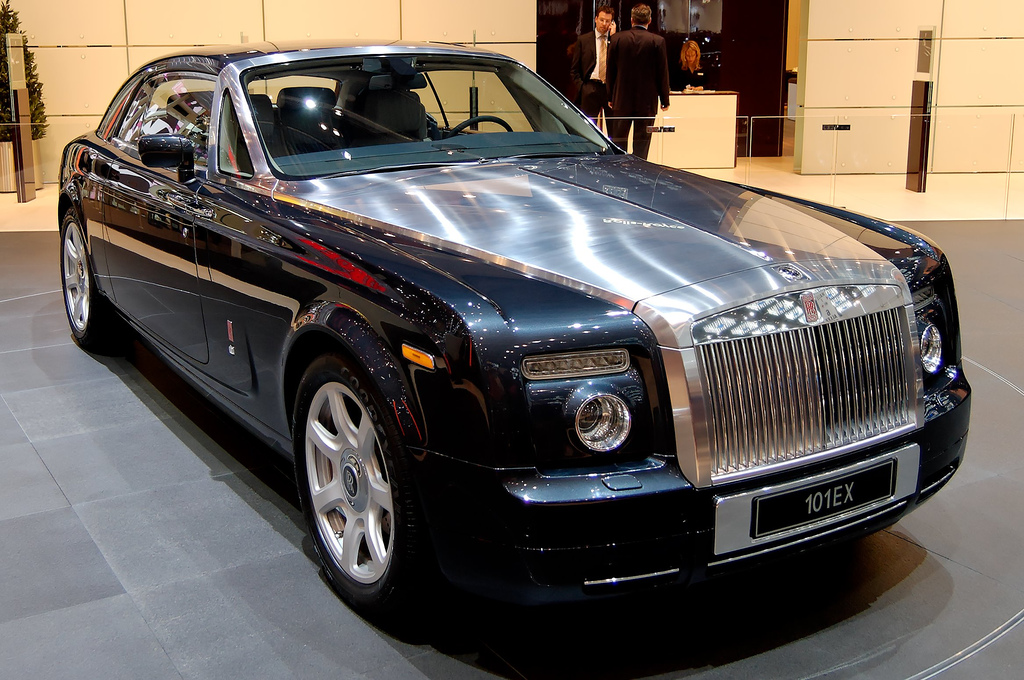

Overview
- Manufacturer: Rolls-Royce Motor Cars
- Production: 100EX: 2004 (concept car); 101EX: 2006 (concept car)
- Designer: Marek Djordjevic

Body and chassis
- Class: Luxury car
- Body style: 100EX: 2-door cabriolet 101EX: 2-door coupé
- Layout: Front-engine, rear-wheel-drive
- Doors: Suicide doors

Powertrain
- Engine: 100EX: 9.0 L V16
- Transmission: 6-speed automatic

Dimensions
- Length: 100EX: 5,669 mm (223.2 in)
- Width: 100EX: 1,990 mm (78.3 in)
- Height: 100EX: 1,561 mm (61.5 in)

The Rolls-Royce 100 EX and the 101 EX, with 'EX' standing for experimental models, are two related concept cars developed by Rolls-Royce Motor Cars and first shown at the Geneva International Auto Show in 2004 and 2006 respectively.

== 100EX: main features ==
- 9.0 litre V16 engine
- 6-speed automatic transmission
- Dimensions:
  - Height 1,561 mm (61.5 in)
  - Width 1,990 mm (78.3 in)
  - Length 5,669 mm (223.2 in)

The 100 EX concept was produced, and presented in 2004, to celebrate the 100th anniversary of the meeting of businessman Charles Rolls and engineer Sir Henry Royce in 1904.

== Rolls-Royce 101EX ==
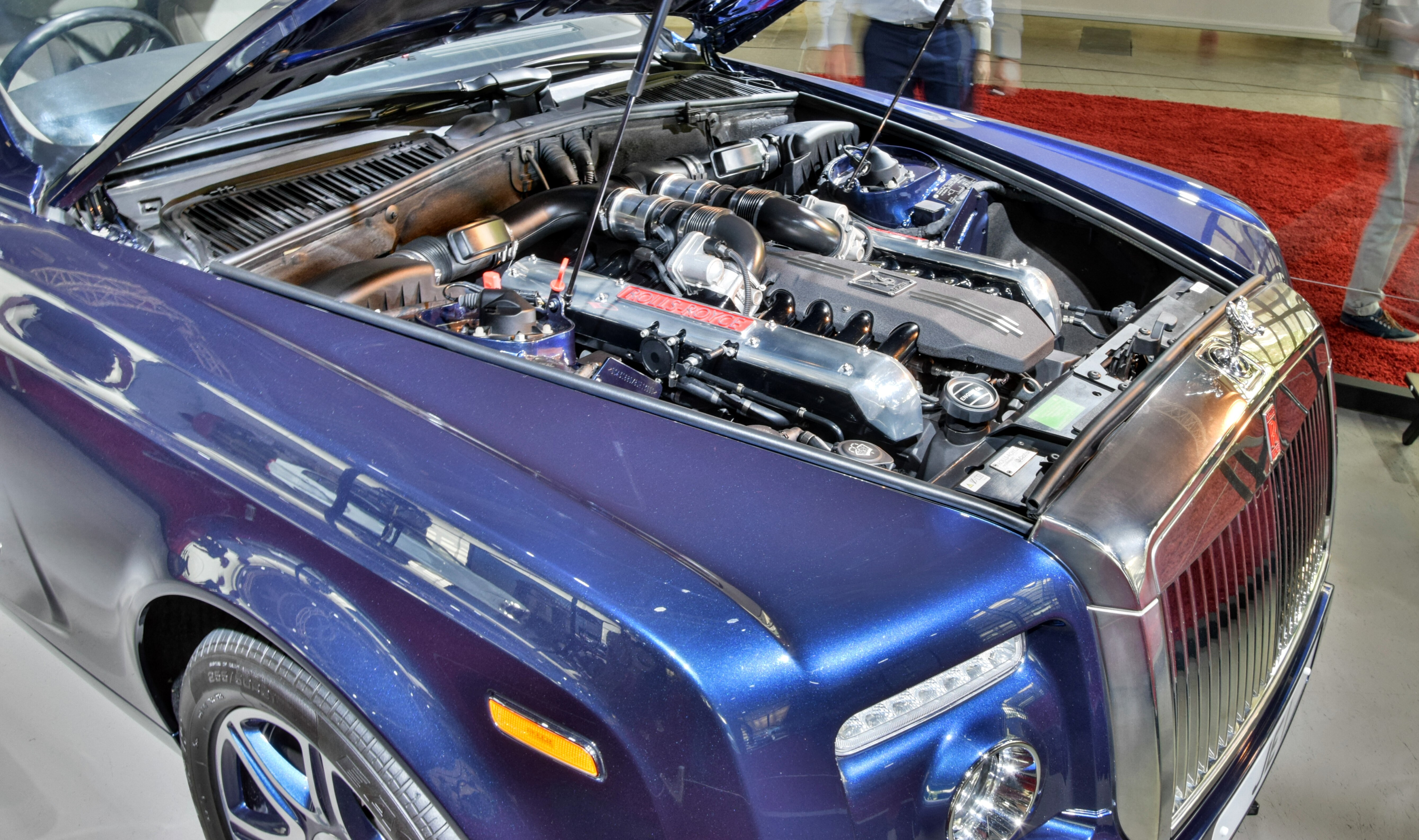
View of the V16 power-unit of the Rolls-Royce 100EX, and featured in the Johnny English Reborn film car.

In 2006, the 101EX, a grand tourer coupe prototype that directly followed the 100EX concept of a possible new line-topping two-door Rolls-Royce, was presented at the 2006 Geneva International Auto Show.

The 101EX shares its aluminium space frame chassis technology with the 2003 Phantom, albeit in a shortened version. The car is 9.5 in (241 mm) shorter than the Phantom saloon, with a lower roofline and shallower glass area. Power comes from a 9L V16 engine.

The updated body styling of the 101EX would eventually serve as the basis for the Phantom Drophead Coupé and Phantom Coupé. The latter car was featured in the film Johnny English Reborn, and for the film Rowan Atkinson persuaded BMW to fit one of the three or four V16s originally developed for the 2003 Phantom saloon into the movie coupé, to which BMW agreed.

== See also ==
- Cadillac Sixteen
- Rolls-Royce Corniche
