= Rolls-Royce Phantom Drophead Coupé =

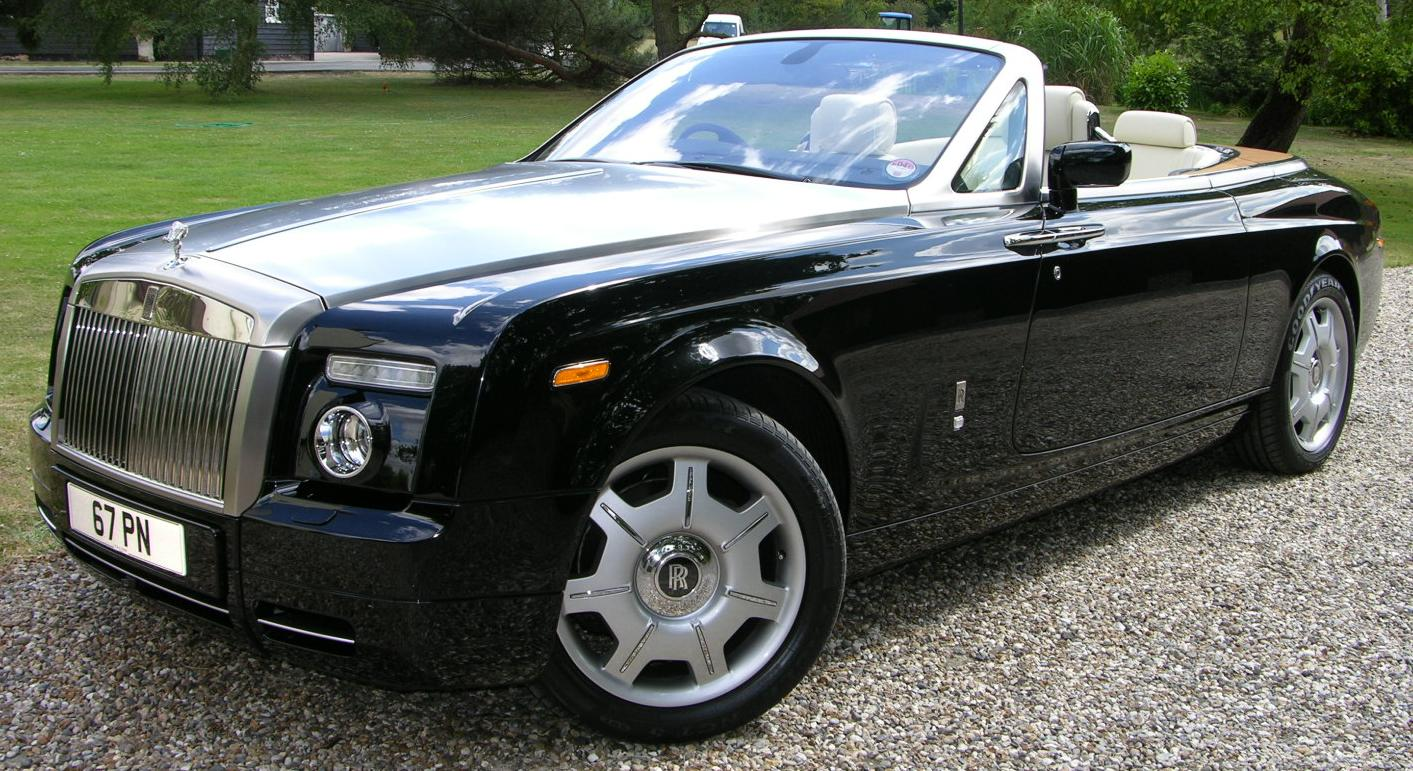

Overview
- Manufacturer: Rolls-Royce Motor Cars
- Production: 2007–2016
- Assembly: United Kingdom: West Sussex, England (Goodwood plant)
- Designer: Ian Cameron

Body and chassis
- Class: Full-size luxury car (F); Grand Tourer (S)
- Body style: 2-door convertible
- Layout: FR layout
- Doors: Coach doors
- Related: Rolls-Royce Phantom Coupé

Powertrain
- Engine: 6,749 cc (412 cu in) V12
- Transmission: 6-speed automatic, 8-speed automatic

Dimensions
- Wheelbase: 3,320 mm (130.7 in)
- Length: 5,609 mm (220.8 in)
- Width: 1,987 mm (78.2 in)
- Height: 1,581 mm (62.2 in)
- Curb weight: 2,620 kg (5,780 lb)

Chronology
- Predecessor: Rolls-Royce Corniche V
- Successor: Rolls-Royce Dawn

The Rolls-Royce Phantom Drophead Coupé is a luxury grand tourer manufactured by Rolls-Royce that debuted at the 2007 North American International Auto Show in Detroit, Michigan, on 7 January 2007. It is based on the 2003 Rolls-Royce Phantom and has styling heavily derived from the 100EX, a concept car shown to celebrate the company's centennial in 2004. Several Drophead Coupés were used in the 2012 Summer Olympics closing ceremony.

== Exterior ==
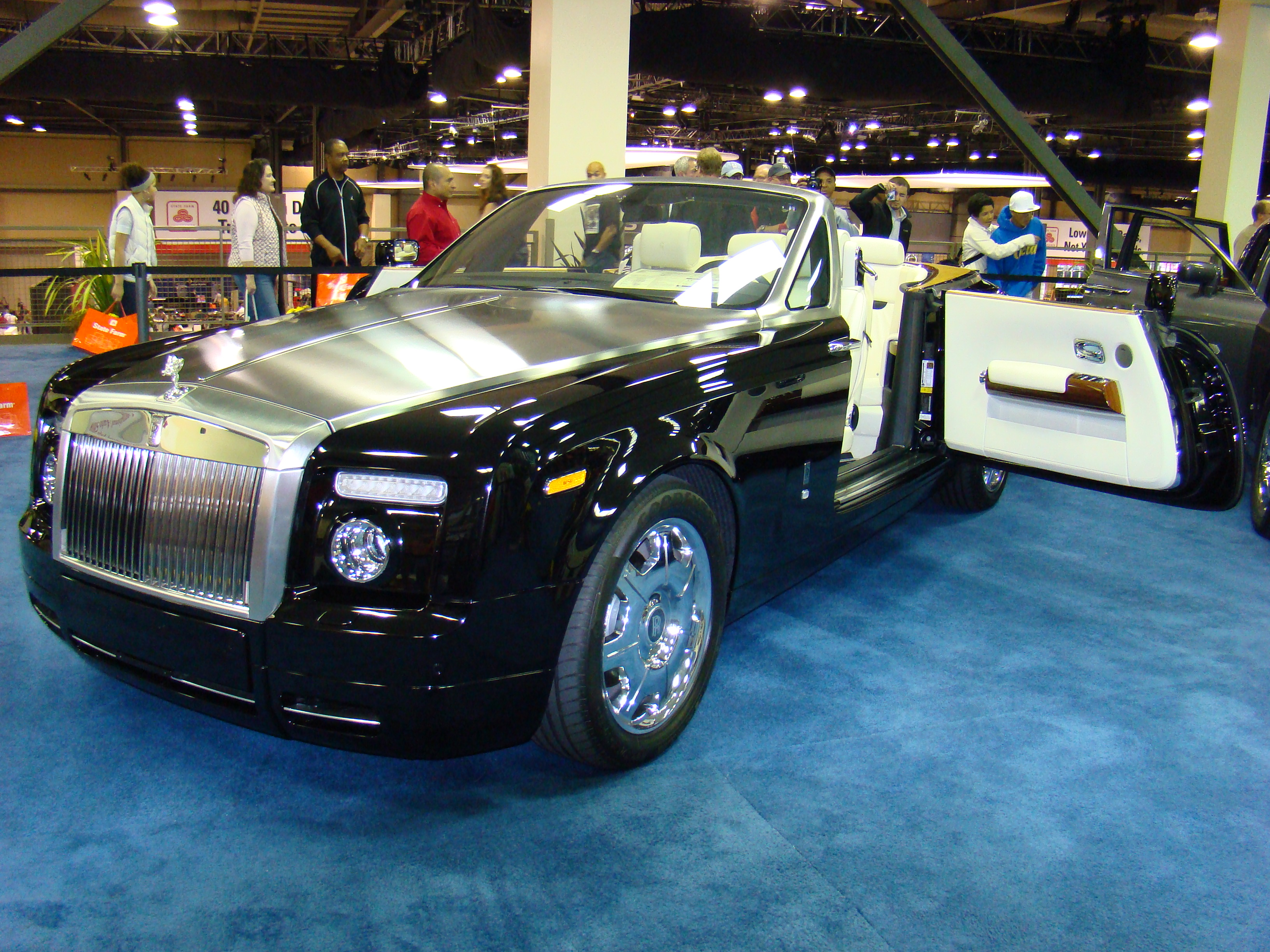
Open "coach" door

The exterior resembles that of the 100EX. The 2-door 4-seat convertible has rearward opening coach doors and a two-tone color scheme that distinguishes between the upper and lower bodywork and frames the teak wood paneling of the convertible's tonneau cover. However, it eschews the EX's aluminum bonnet in favor of more easily maintained stainless steel.

The front fascia resembles that of the 100EX but its middle bodywork/raised bonnet/grille assemblage stops midway down rather than continuing downwards and bisecting the front bumper. The headlamps are also those of the 100EX/101EX concept and are similar to the Phantom's. The deep set rectangular high beams are LED units while the round "faux-foglamp" driving lights are projector-style xenon arc lamps. The exterior is available in more than 44,000 color combinations.

It combines aluminum technology and hand-crafted materials. As with other current Rolls-Royce models, the hood ornament, the Spirit of Ecstasy, automatically retracts into the bonnet whenever the car is locked or whenever the driver so chooses.

== Interior ==
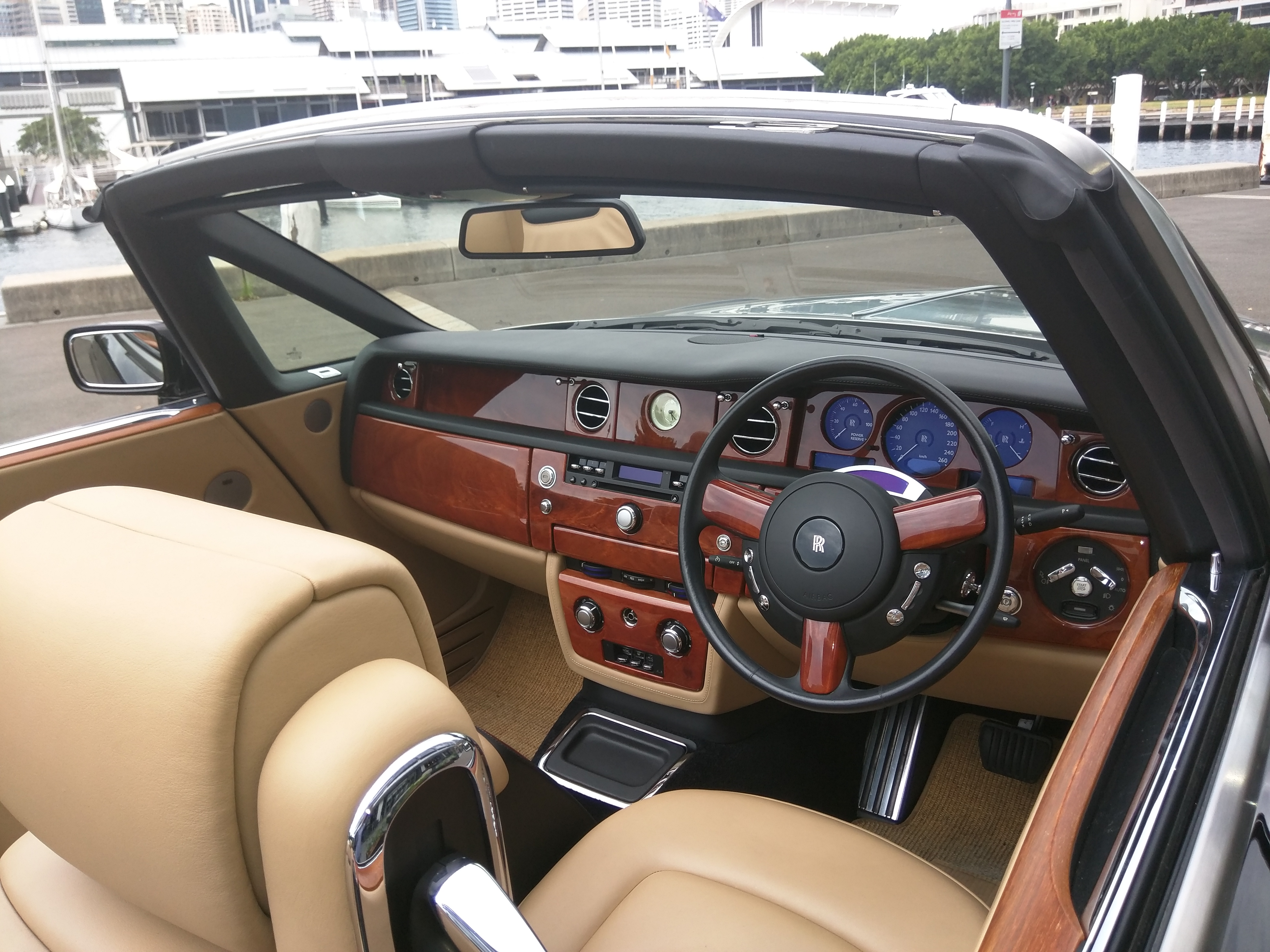
Dashboard and the A-pillar

The interior has wood veneering that wraps around the 8/9ths top portion of the cabin from coach door to coach door and ends in a crafted convertible tonneau cover, finished in teak panelling sandwiched between an interior band of contrasting hardwood and the bare stainless steel motif of the car's upper exterior bodywork. Like the 100EX and 101EX, the dashboard and the steering wheel are from the Phantom.

Triangular A-pillars with quarter glass, and spring-loaded pop-up rollover hoops behind the rear seats, provide additional strength and protection for the convertible body.

== Production ==
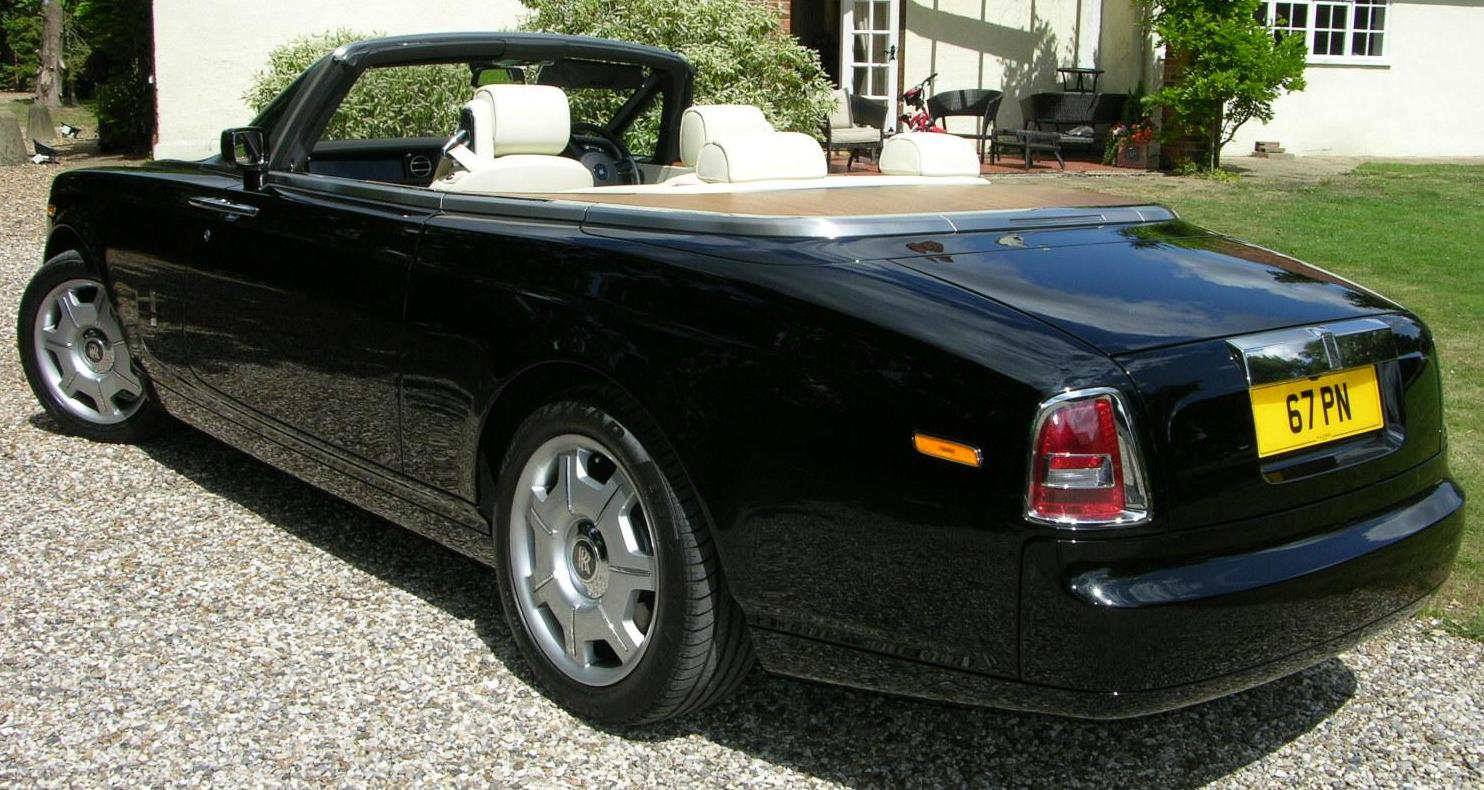
Rolls-Royce Phantom Drophead Coupé

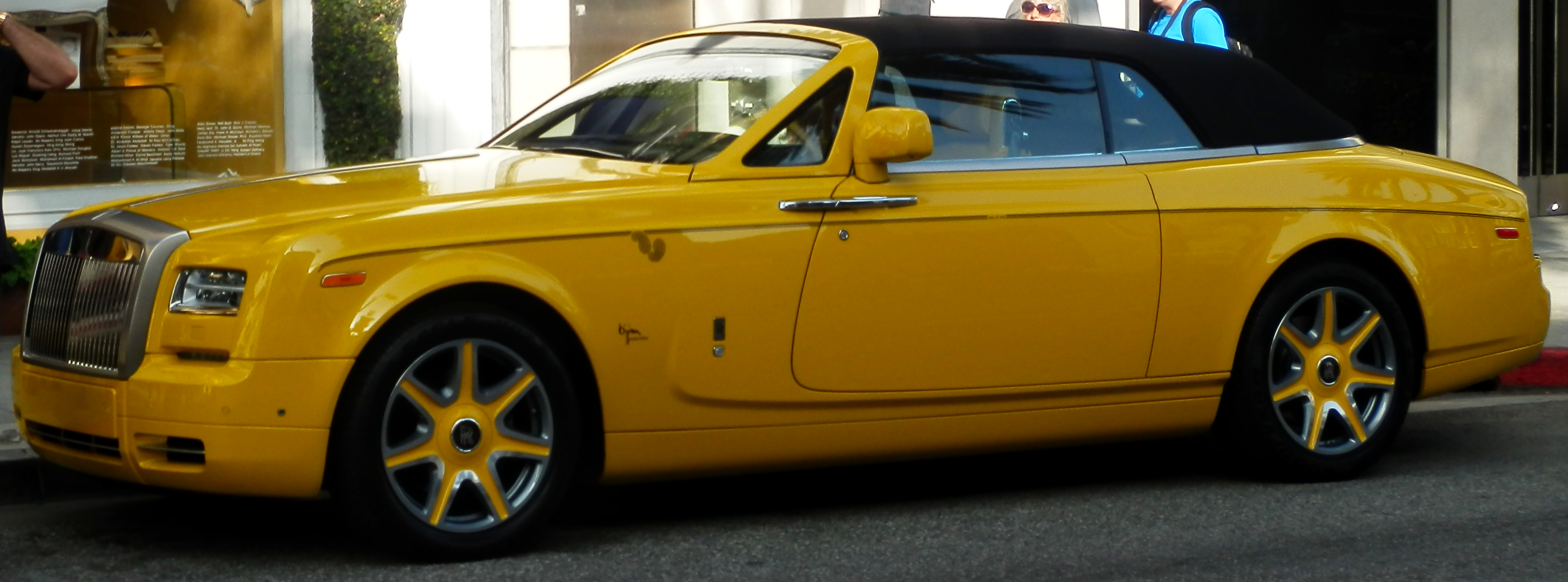
Drophead Coupé Bijan

In its first year on the market (2007), 253 Drophead Coupés were sold worldwide.

The first car destined for the U.S. market was auctioned at the 2007 Naples, Florida Winter Wine festival charity for $2 million, of which $1.6 million went to the Naples Children and Education Foundation. Bought by a local real estate developer, this was believed at the time to be the most expensive new car ever sold in the U.S. The 2012 Rolls Royce Drophead Coupe Series 1, is the most desirable and very last Drophead Coupe to resemble the Rolls-Royce 100EX prototype, only seven unrivalled right hand drive cars were built for selective customers. In that same year, Rolls Royce presented the new Drophead Coupe Series 2 at the 2012 Geneva Motor Show. Rolls Royce discontinued the Drophead Coupe in 2016 and made the very last Drophead Coupe "Last of Last Edition" in 2017. Around this period, the Drophead Coupe was deemed the most expensive Rolls Royce in the British car company's history. This statement has now been handed over to the Rolls-Royce Boat Tail, which predominantly resembles the Drophead Coupe Series 1. Prices for the Rolls Royce Boat Tail start from $28 Million for the world's wealthiest hand picked client's.

== Concepts ==
In 2007 Pininfarina was commissioned to build a version called the Hyperion for collector Roland Hall, based on the Drophead Coupé. The car is a 2-seat roadster and was shown in 2008 at the Pebble Beach Concours d'Elegance. In 2009 it was sold for £4,000,000.
