= Rolls-Royce Phantom Coupé =

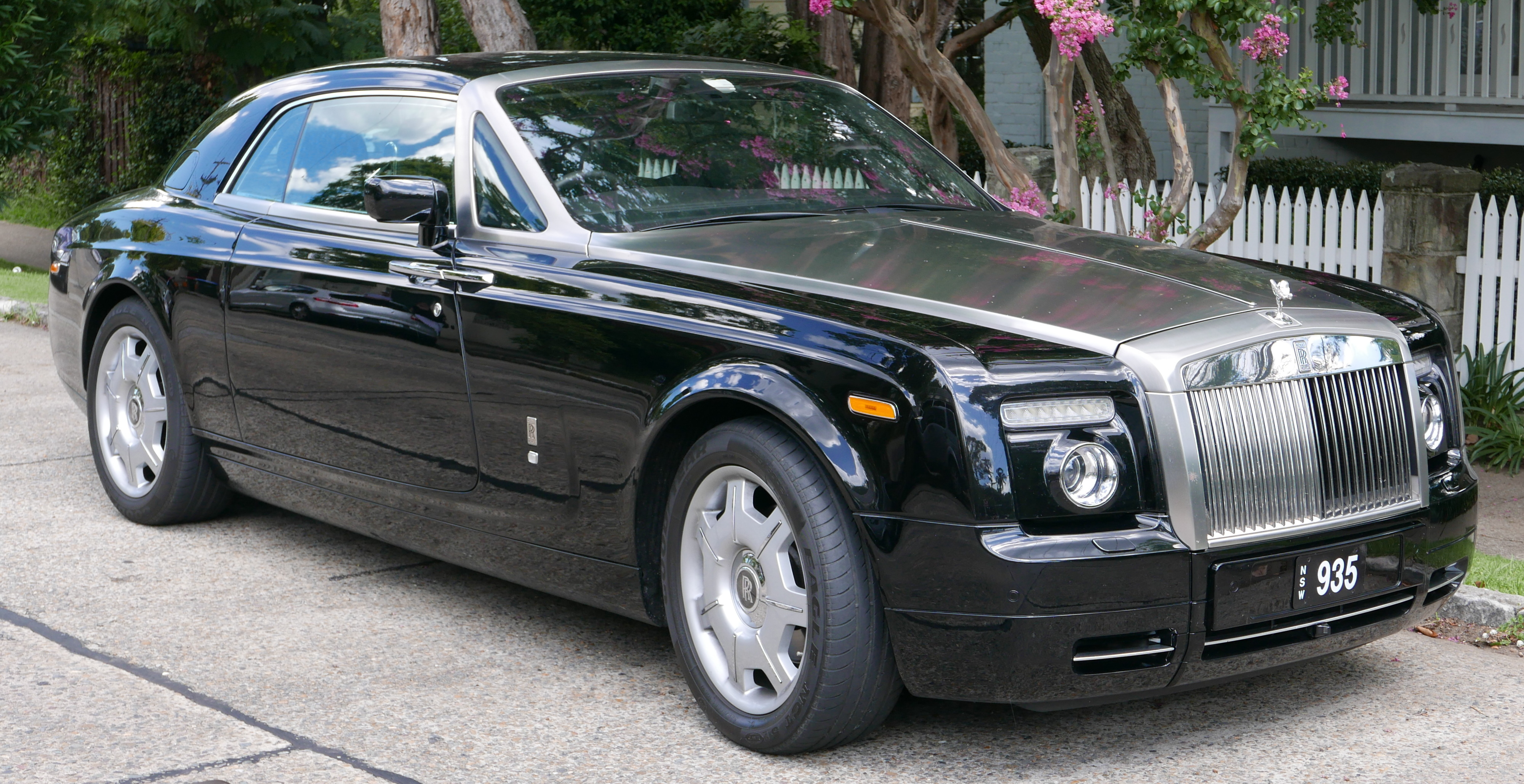

Overview
- Manufacturer: Rolls-Royce Motor Cars (BMW)
- Production: 2008–2016
- Assembly: United Kingdom: West Sussex, England (Goodwood plant)
- Designer: Ian Cameron

Body and chassis
- Class: Full-size luxury car (F); Grand Tourer (S)
- Body style: 2-door coupé
- Layout: FR layout
- Doors: Coach doors
- Related: Rolls-Royce Phantom Drophead

Powertrain
- Engine: 6.75 L V12
- Power output: 460 PS (338 kW; 454 bhp)
- Transmission: 6-speed automatic, 8-speed automatic

Dimensions
- Wheelbase: 3,320 mm (130.7 in)
- Length: 5,609 mm (220.8 in)
- Width: 1,987 mm (78.2 in)
- Height: 1,592 mm (62.7 in)
- Kerb weight: 2,590 kg (5,710 lb)

Chronology
- Successor: Rolls-Royce Wraith

The Rolls-Royce Phantom Coupé is a luxury car manufactured by Rolls-Royce Motor Cars that debuted at the 2008 Geneva International Motor Show in Geneva, Switzerland, on 6 March 2008. The platform is based on the 2003 Rolls-Royce Phantom and has styling heavily derived from the Rolls-Royce 100EX, a concept car unveiled to celebrate the company's centennial in 2004. Its interior includes leather and wood veneer. There is a button to close the "coach doors" (suicide doors). The Phantom Coupe has the same 6.75-litre (412 cu in) V12 as found in the other Phantom models, developing 338 kW (453 bhp; 460 PS) of power and 720 N⋅m (530 lb⋅ft) of torque. It is the first Rolls-Royce coupe in 22 years. It featured pillarless body construction making it a true 2-door hardtop, much like the popular hardtops from the United States in the 1960s.

== Specification ==
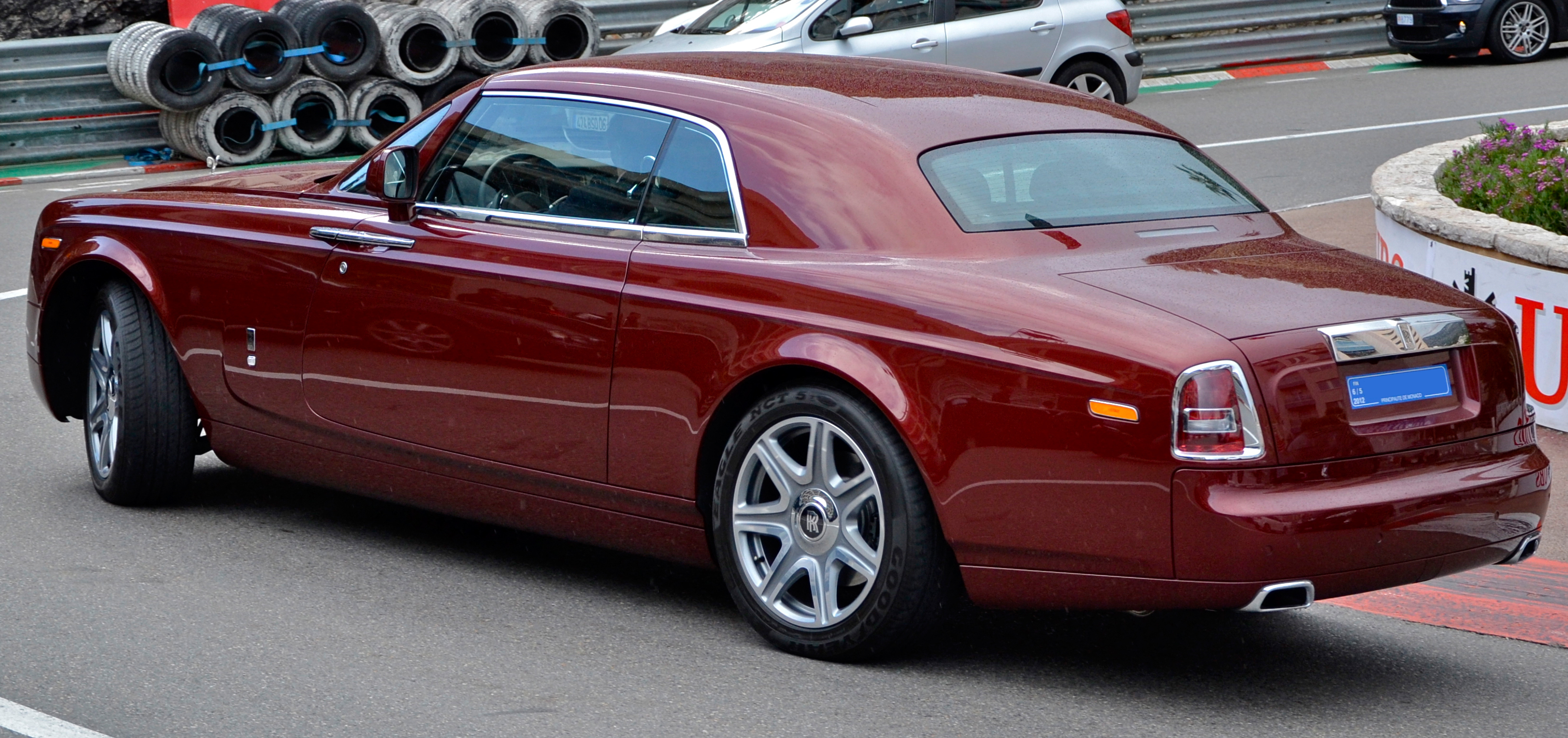
Rolls-Royce Phantom coupé

The Phantom Coupé has nearly 542 N⋅m (400 lb⋅ft) of torque, or 75 percent, available at 1,000 rpm—and has segment-leading fuel economy thanks to technology such as direct injection and variable valve and camshaft control. The car features reverse-opening power-closing doors, adaptive suspension with automatic four-corner levelling, 21-inch alloy wheels, a 15-speaker 420 watt sound system with navigation, and a handcrafted interior with flawless leather trim and a choice of wood veneers. The "picnic" boot provides a seating platform for two and offers easy access to the luggage compartment. Optional equipment includes front and rear parking cameras and a wide array of paint colours and interior trim material choices. A unique option is a full-length "starlight" headliner, which incorporates hundreds of tiny fibre optics to give the impression of a star-filled night sky.

== Performance ==
The Phantom Coupé is capable of accelerating from 0–60 mph (0–97 km/h) in 5.8 seconds and has a limited top speed of 155 mph (249 km/h), with a fuel consumption in combined cycle (ECE+EUDC) of 16 L/100 km (18 mpg_{‑imp}; 15 mpg_{‑US}) while producing 377 g/km of CO_{2}.

== Reception ==
The Phantom Coupé has received mostly positive reviews from critics. The British television show Top Gear rated the car 9/10 for performance, 10/10 for quality, 9/10 for design, but criticised its high cost.

== Sweptail ==
The Rolls-Royce Sweptail was a one-off custom Phantom Coupé sold in 2017 for $12.8 million after a 4-year build making it the most expensive new car ever sold at the contemporary period.

== See also ==
- Coupé
