= Goodwood plant =

Factory in West Sussex, England

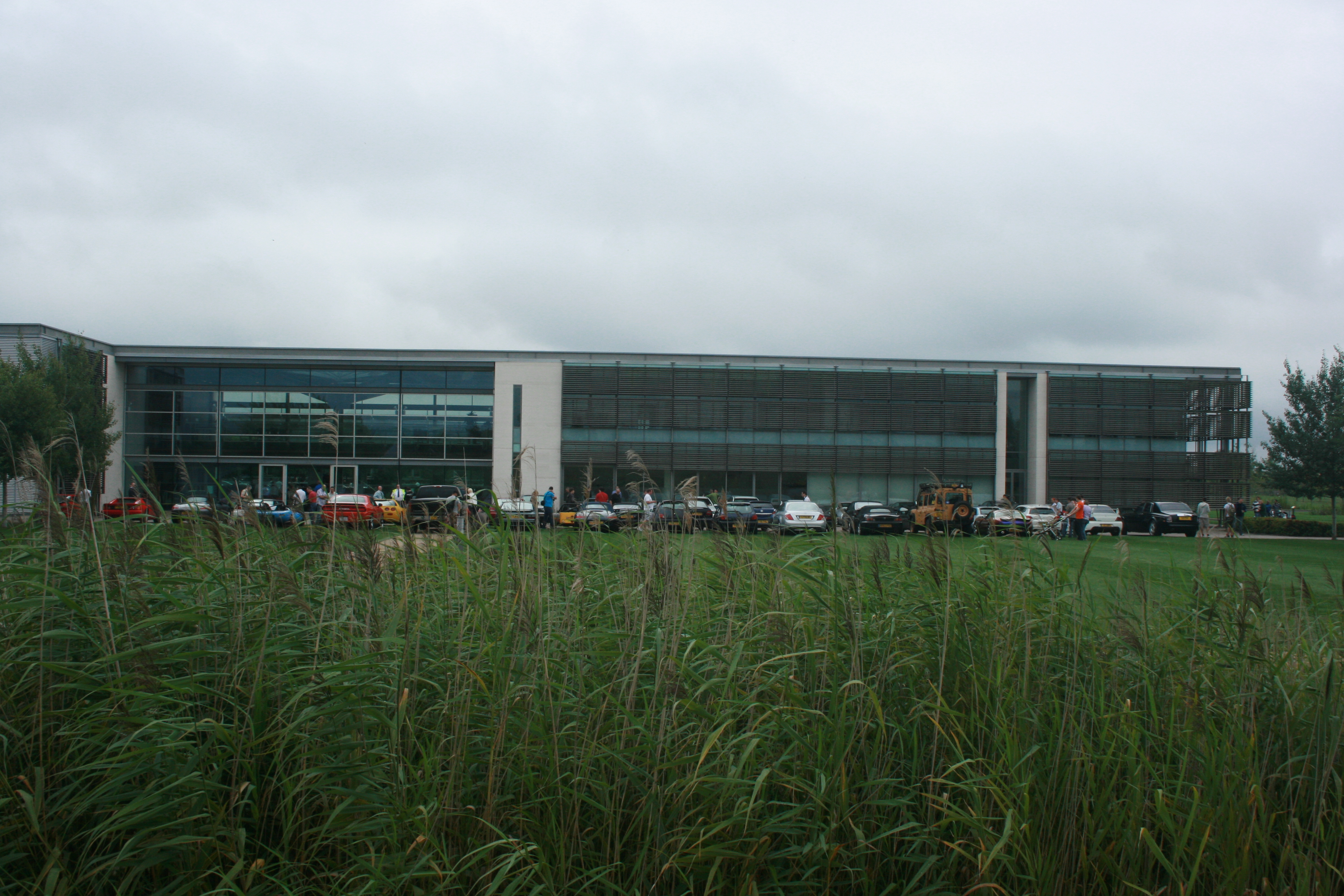
- Interactive map of the Goodwood plant area

General information
- Location: Westhampnett near Chichester, West Sussex, England
- Coordinates: 50°51′13″N 00°44′40″W
- Opened: 1 January 2003

Technical details
- Structural system: Steel frame

Design and construction
- Architect: Sir Nicholas Grimshaw

The Goodwood plant is the headquarters, design, manufacturing and assembly centre for Rolls-Royce Motor Cars.

Officially opened on 1 January 2003, the plant is situated on a site covering 42 acres (17 ha). The plant has been expanded since. Over 1,700 workers are currently employed at Goodwood. As of 2017, the plant produced approximately 20 cars a day.

== History ==
After BMW bought the rights to the Rolls-Royce brand as applied to motor cars from Vickers plc, it required a new manufacturing plant in which to build the new cars. Rolls-Royce cars had until this time been built at the Crewe plant, but both the plant and the Bentley brand had been sold to the Volkswagen Group.

BMW came to an agreement with the Earl of March to buy a greenfield site on his Goodwood Estate, near Chichester, West Sussex. The original plant, located close to Goodwood Circuit and Westhampnett village, cost £65 million. BMW engaged architect Sir Nicholas Grimshaw, the architect of the Eden Project in Cornwall. Designed to fit into its environment, the plant cannot be viewed from the road, in part due to a 3.5 ha "living roof" planted with sedum plants, the largest such roof in the UK. Other features help the 42-acre site blend in with the surrounding countryside, such as the planting of 400,000 plants and over 120 species of trees, as well as limestone and cedar cladding on the buildings. The plant is situated in an Area of Outstanding Natural Beauty, which may make further expansion difficult.

== Technology and Logistics Centre ==
Rolls-Royce opened its new Technology and Logistics Centre (TLC) in January 2016. The 30,000 square metres (320,000 sq ft) facility is located in Bognor Regis, eight miles from the Goodwood plant. The TLC provides logistics support to the manufacturing plant for current and future models, and consolidates three operations: an inbound warehouse for production parts, a distribution centre – including an inbound body store and finished car store – and a workshop. The TLC will be extended in late-2017 by almost 10,000 square metres (110,000 sq ft) to meet growing demand and in readiness for future models, such as the Cullinan. The expansion will give the TLC the same overall footprint as the Goodwood plant.

== Models produced ==
- Rolls-Royce Ghost: 2009 – Present
- Rolls-Royce Phantom VIII: 2017 – Present
- Rolls-Royce Cullinan: 2018 – Present
- Rolls-Royce Spectre: 2023 – Present

== Former models produced ==
- Rolls-Royce Phantom VII: 2003–2016
- Rolls-Royce Phantom Drophead Coupé: 2007–2016
- Rolls-Royce Phantom Coupé: 2008–2016
- Rolls-Royce Wraith: 2013–2023
- Rolls-Royce Dawn: 2015–2023
