= Rolls-Royce Motor Cars =

British automobile company (1998–present)

Rolls-Royce Motor Cars Limited
- Type: Subsidiary
- Industry: Automotive
- Founded: March 1998; 28 years ago in the United Kingdom
- Headquarters: Goodwood, West Sussex, England, United Kingdom
- Area served: Worldwide
- Key people: Christopher Brownridge (CEO); Werner Lulay (Director of Finance); Gunther Böhner (Director of Manufacturing); Julian Jenkins (Director of Sales & Brand)
- Products: Phantom; Spectre; Ghost; Cullinan
- Services: Automobile manufacture
- Number of employees: c.2,500 (2026)
- Parent: BMW
- Website: rolls-roycemotorcars.com

Rolls-Royce Motor Cars Limited is a British luxury automobile maker that has operated as a wholly owned subsidiary of BMW AG since 2003 – as the exclusive manufacturer of Rolls-Royce-badged motor cars. The company's administrative and production headquarters are located at the 42-acre (17 ha) Goodwood plant, close to Goodwood Estate in West Sussex, England, United Kingdom.

From 1906, motor cars were manufactured and marketed under the Rolls-Royce marque by Rolls-Royce Limited until 1973, and Rolls-Royce Motors from 1973 until 2003. The Rolls-Royce Motor Cars subsidiary of BMW AG has no direct relationship to Rolls-Royce-branded vehicles produced before 2003, other than having briefly supplied components and engines. The Bentley Motors Limited subsidiary of Volkswagen AG is the direct successor to Rolls-Royce Motors and various other predecessor entities that produced Rolls-Royce and Bentley-badged cars between the foundation of each company and 2003, when the BMW-controlled entity started producing cars under the Rolls-Royce name.

The BBC called Rolls-Royce "probably one of the most recognised icons in the world", and said that "the name Rolls-Royce entered the English language as a superlative."

The company's line of vehicles includes the Phantom, the top-of-the-line four-door saloon first offered in 2003 and, as of January 2025, offered in two lengths; the smaller Ghost four-door saloon, also offered in two lengths; the Cullinan SUV; and the Spectre coupé, which is Rolls-Royce's first electric car.

== History ==
Spirit of Ecstasy, the bonnet mascot sculpture on Rolls-Royce cars

Rolls-Royce Motor Cars Limited was created as a wholly owned subsidiary of BMW in 1998 after BMW licensed the rights to the Rolls-Royce name and logo from Rolls-Royce Holdings plc, and acquired the rights to the Spirit of Ecstasy and Rolls-Royce grille shape trademarks from Volkswagen AG. Rolls-Royce Motor Cars Limited has been manufacturing Rolls-Royce-branded cars since 2003.

Although the Rolls-Royce brand name has been in use since 1906, the fate of the company and trademark diverged between 1998 and 2003. In 2003, the Rolls-Royce Motor Cars subsidiary of BMW AG, which had been a major supplier to the brand up to 2003, began manufacturing vehicles with the Rolls-Royce name. Volkswagen AG took ownership of the Bentley name as well as previous Rolls-Royce production facilities and previous Rolls-Royce designs.

Former chief executive Torsten Müller-Ötvös joined the company in January 2010, with a pledge to regain the quality standards that made Rolls-Royce famous. That year sales in China increased by 600%, making it the company's second largest market after the US.

On 5 October 2023 Rolls-Royce announced that Müller-Ötvös was to retire as CEO on 30 November after 14 years. He was succeeded by Chris Brownridge, the former CEO of BMW UK, who became the company's new CEO on 1 December 2023. Müller-Ötvös was the company's longest serving CEO to date.

=== Ownership and licensing of trademarks ===
Rolls-Royce Motor Cars emblem

In 1998, Vickers decided to sell Rolls-Royce Motors. The most likely buyer was BMW, which already supplied engines and other components for Rolls-Royce and Bentley cars, but BMW's final offer of £340 million was beaten by Volkswagen's £430 million ($703 million).

A stipulation in the ownership documents of Rolls-Royce dictated that Rolls-Royce Holdings plc, the aero-engine maker, would retain certain essential trademarks, including the Rolls-Royce brand name and logo if the automotive division was sold. Although Vickers plc sold the vehicle designs, nameplates, administrative headquarters, production facilities, Spirit of Ecstasy and Rolls-Royce grille shape trademarks to Volkswagen AG, Rolls-Royce plc chose to license the Rolls-Royce name and logo to BMW AG for £40 million ($66 million), because Rolls-Royce plc had recently had joint business ventures with BMW.

BMW's contract to supply engines and components to Rolls-Royce Motors allowed BMW to cancel the contract with 12 months' notice. Volkswagen would be unable to re-engineer the Rolls-Royce and Bentley vehicles to use other engines within that time frame. With the Rolls-Royce brand identification marks split between the two companies and Volkswagen's engine supply in jeopardy, the two companies entered into negotiations. Volkswagen agreed to sell BMW the Spirit of Ecstasy and grille shape trademarks and BMW agreed to continue supplying engines and components until 2003. Volkswagen continued to produce Rolls-Royce-badged vehicles between 1998 and 2003. This gave BMW time to build a new Rolls-Royce administrative headquarters and production facility on the Goodwood Estate near Chichester, West Sussex, and develop the Phantom, the first Rolls-Royce from the new company. Rolls-Royce Motor Cars Limited became the exclusive manufacturer of Rolls-Royce-branded cars in 2003. Rolls-Royce announced in September 2014 that a new technology and logistics centre would be built, which opened in 2016, 8 miles away from the main headquarters, in the seaside resort town of Bognor Regis.

== List of CEOs ==
Current: Christopher Brownridge (since December 2023)

=== Past CEOs ===
- Ian Robertson (2005–2008)
- Thomas Purves (2008–2010)
- Torsten Müller-Ötvös (2010–2023)

== Products ==
=== Current ===
==== Phantom ====
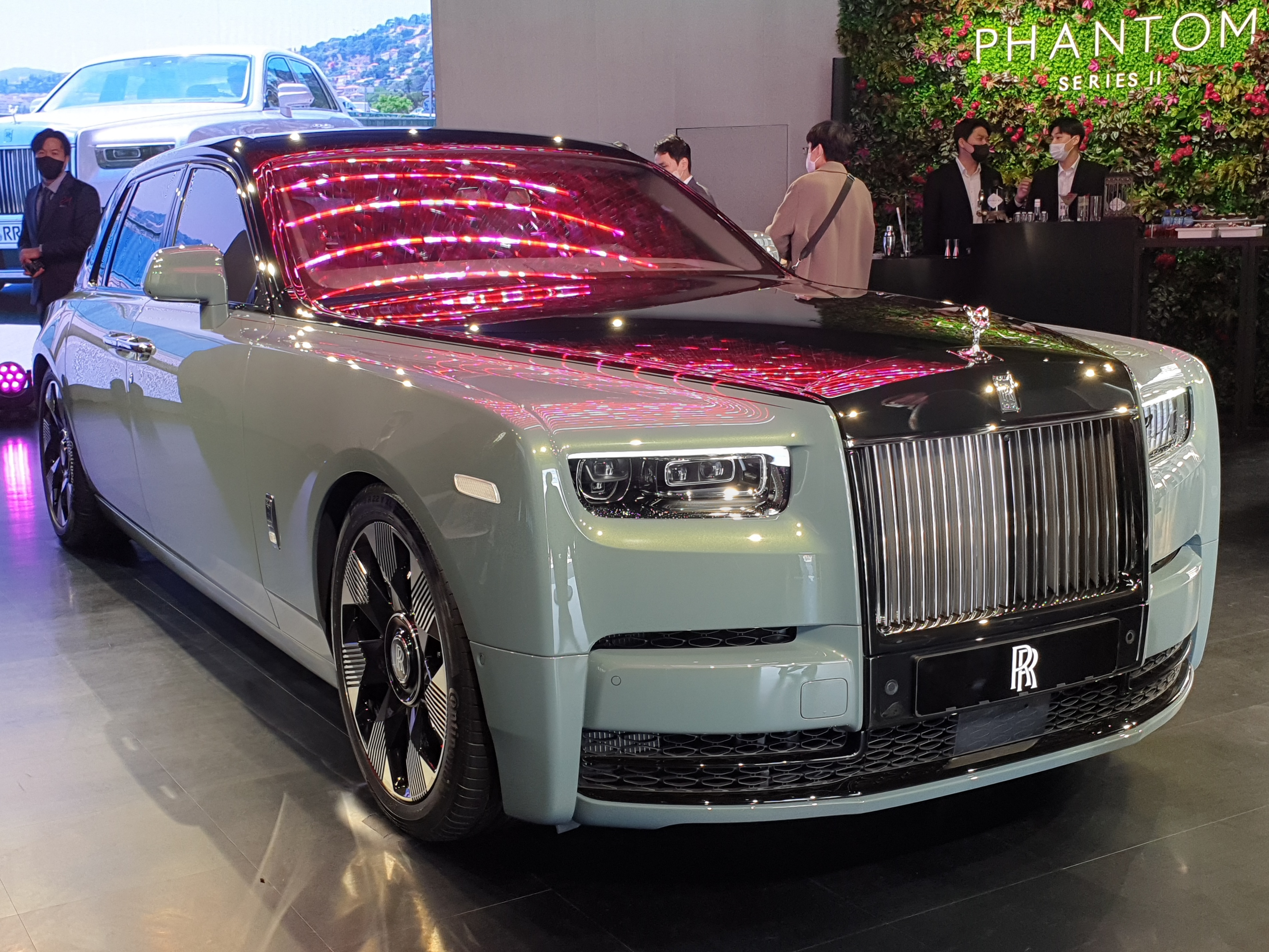
Rolls-Royce Phantom VIII Series II

- Rolls-Royce unveiled the new Phantom at "The Great Eight Phantoms Exhibit", which would go into production at the end of 2017, with sales starting in 2018. This is the current Flagship Model and the most expensive production car made by Rolls-Royce Motor Cars.
- A facelifted model, dubbed the Series II was revealed on 12 May 2022 and has received subtle exterior changes and four additional wheel options.
- The Phantom comes in two lengths: a standard version and an extended wheelbase version which added 200 mm of length, exclusively for the rear passengers. The extended version is the longest sedan currently in production.

==== Ghost (Second Generation) ====
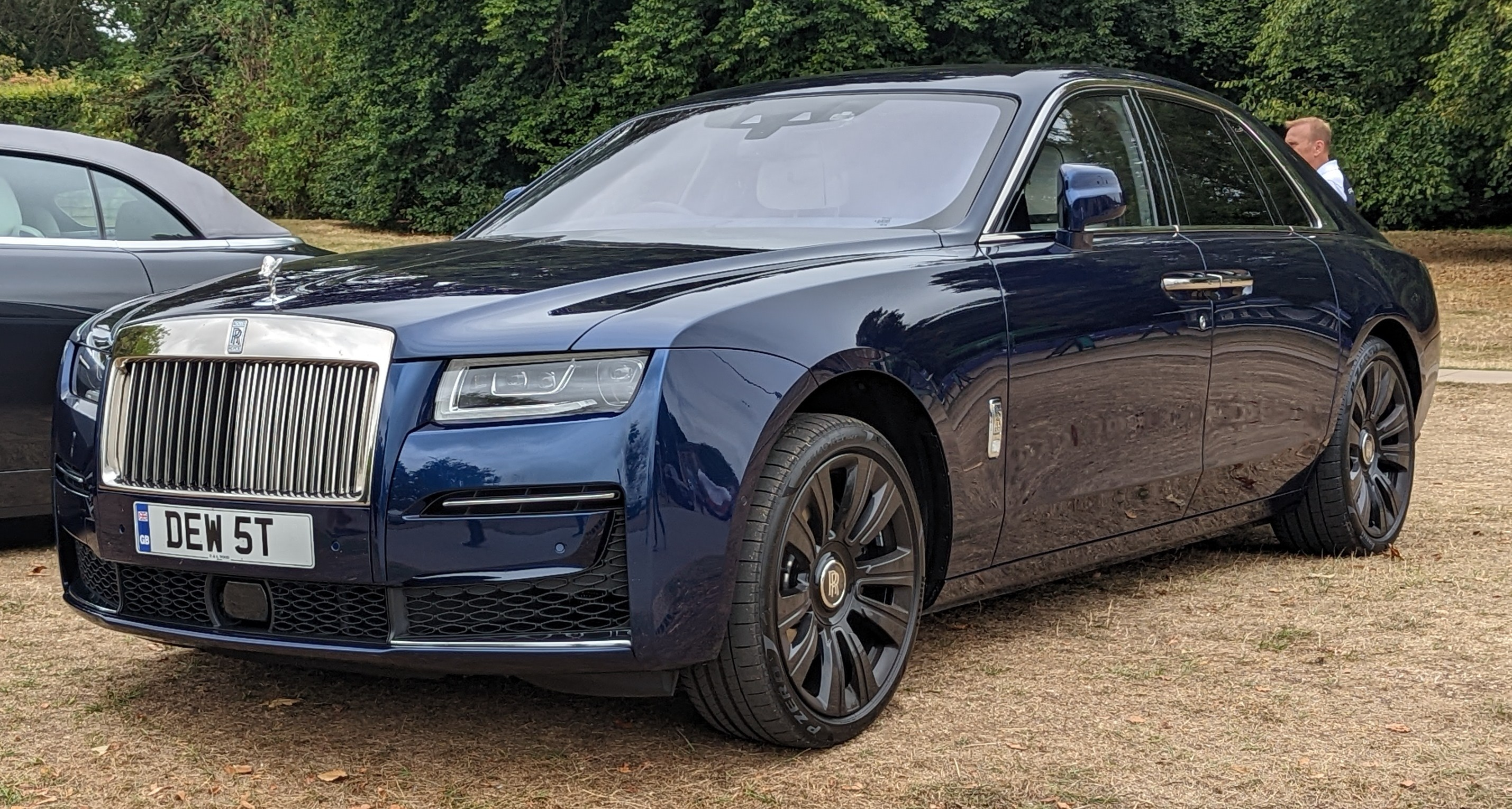
Rolls-Royce Ghost Second Generation (Series I)

- The Current Rolls-Royce Ghost was unveiled on 1 September 2020 as a Rolls-Royce's current entry model.
- An Extended Wheelbase version is available, adding 160 mm of length into the car for the rear occupants.
- A facelifted model - the Series II was unveiled on 10 August 2024. Subtle changes were made to the exterior, noticeably with the taillights.

==== Cullinan ====
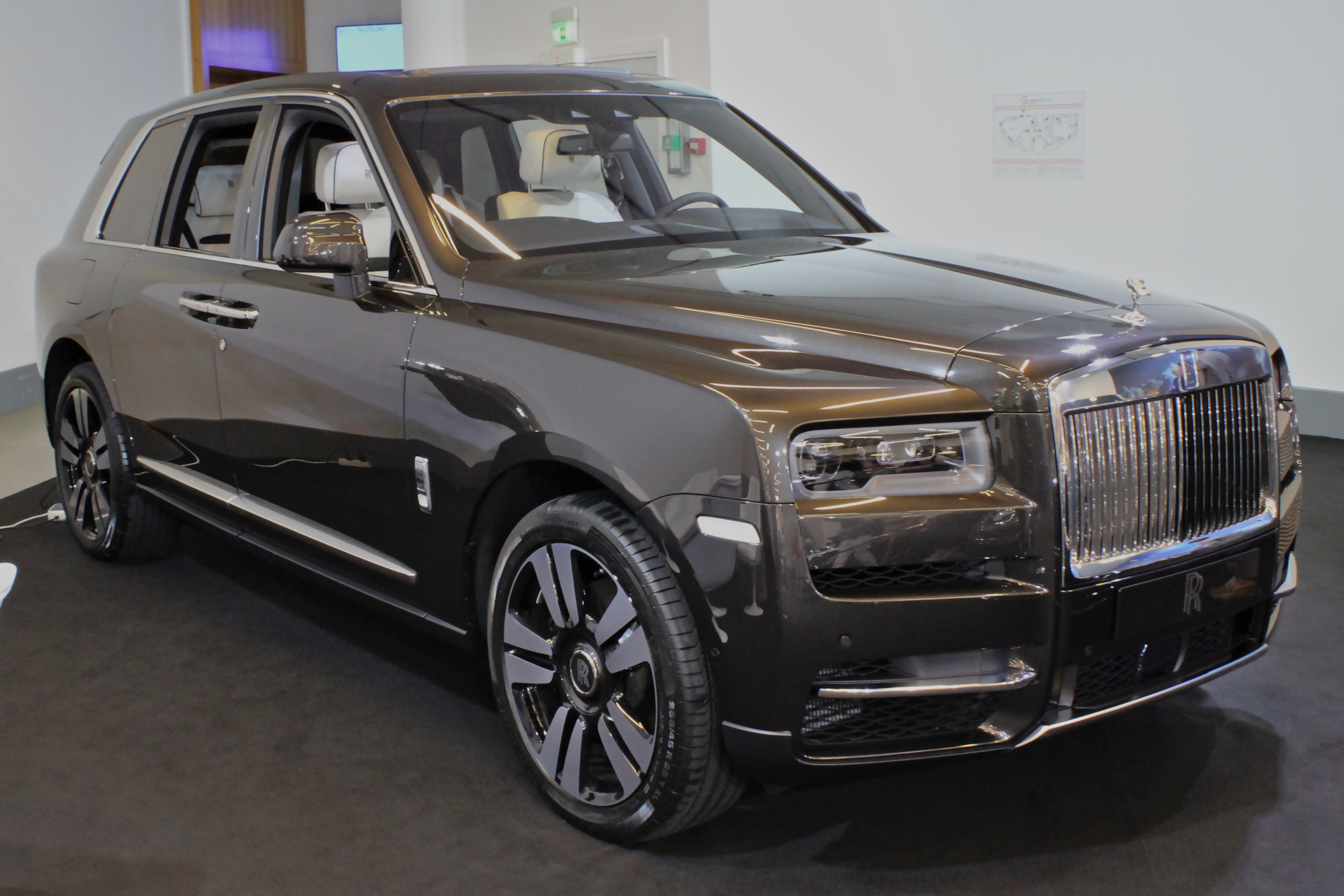
Rolls-Royce Cullinan (Series I)

- After much anticipation, Rolls-Royce revealed the Cullinan in early 2018. The 5-door SUV shares the "Architecture of Luxury" platform and many components with the Phantom.
- The Cullinan also received a facelift, which was unveiled on 5 July 2024.

==== Spectre ====
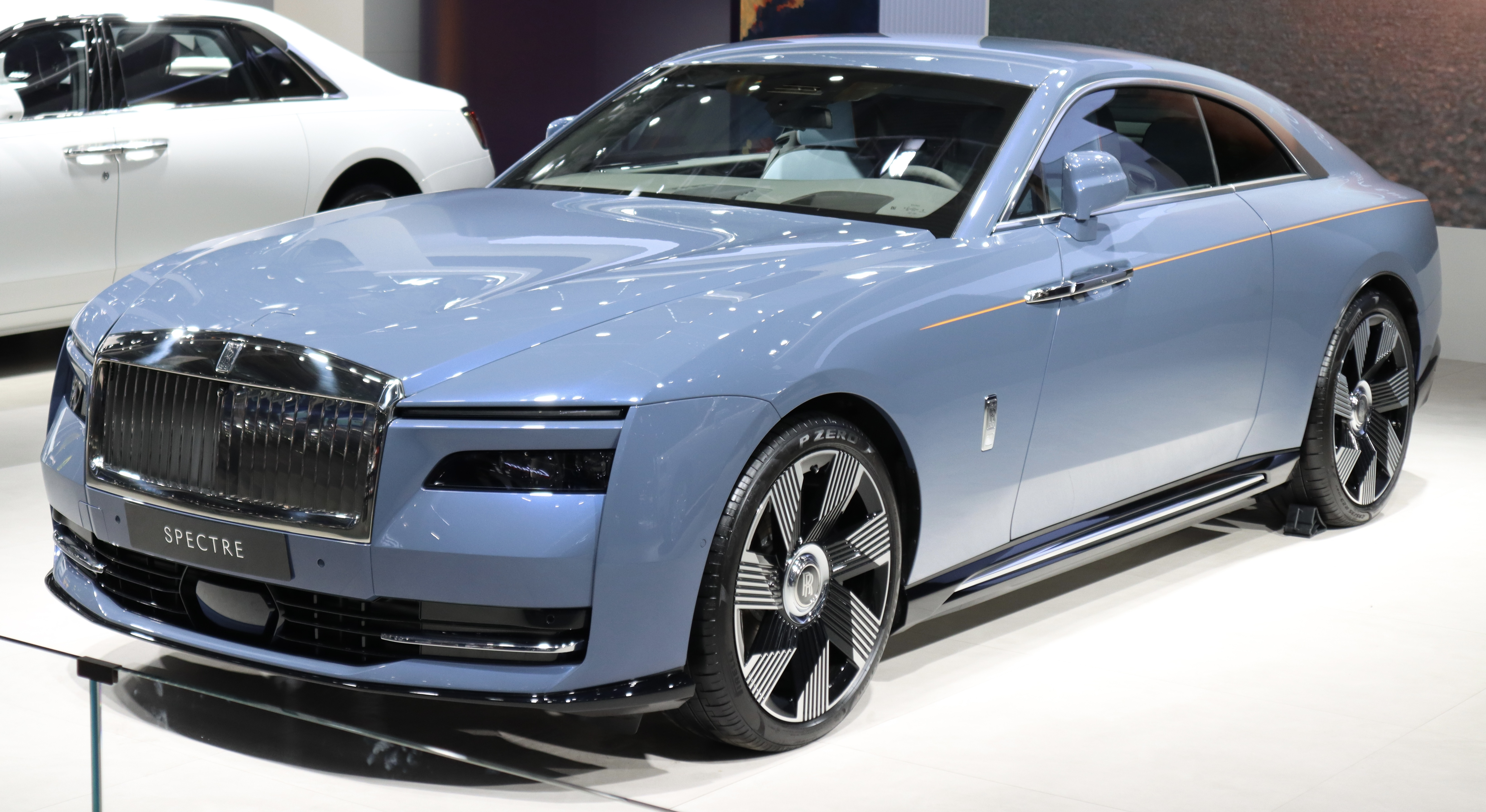
Rolls-Royce Spectre

- Rolls-Royce's first all-electric car, and the most aerodynamic, the Spectre was revealed on 18 October 2022. The Spectre is positioned between the Cullinan and the Phantom.
- It introduces a redesigned Spirit of Ecstasy, with one leg forward, a lower, powerful stance, and more realistic, and aerodynamic robes (commonly mistaken as wings).

=== Former ===
==== Phantom ====
- 2003–2016 – Phantom 4-door saloon. Launched in January 2003 at Detroit's North American International Auto Show, this is the first model from Rolls-Royce Motor Cars Limited. The car has a 6.75 L V12 engine sourced from BMW, but most components are unique to the car. Parts are sourced from Continental Europe and the UK. Assembly, leatherwork, woodwork, and finishing are carried out in a new factory in Goodwood near Chichester, Sussex. It received a facelift for the 2013 model year.
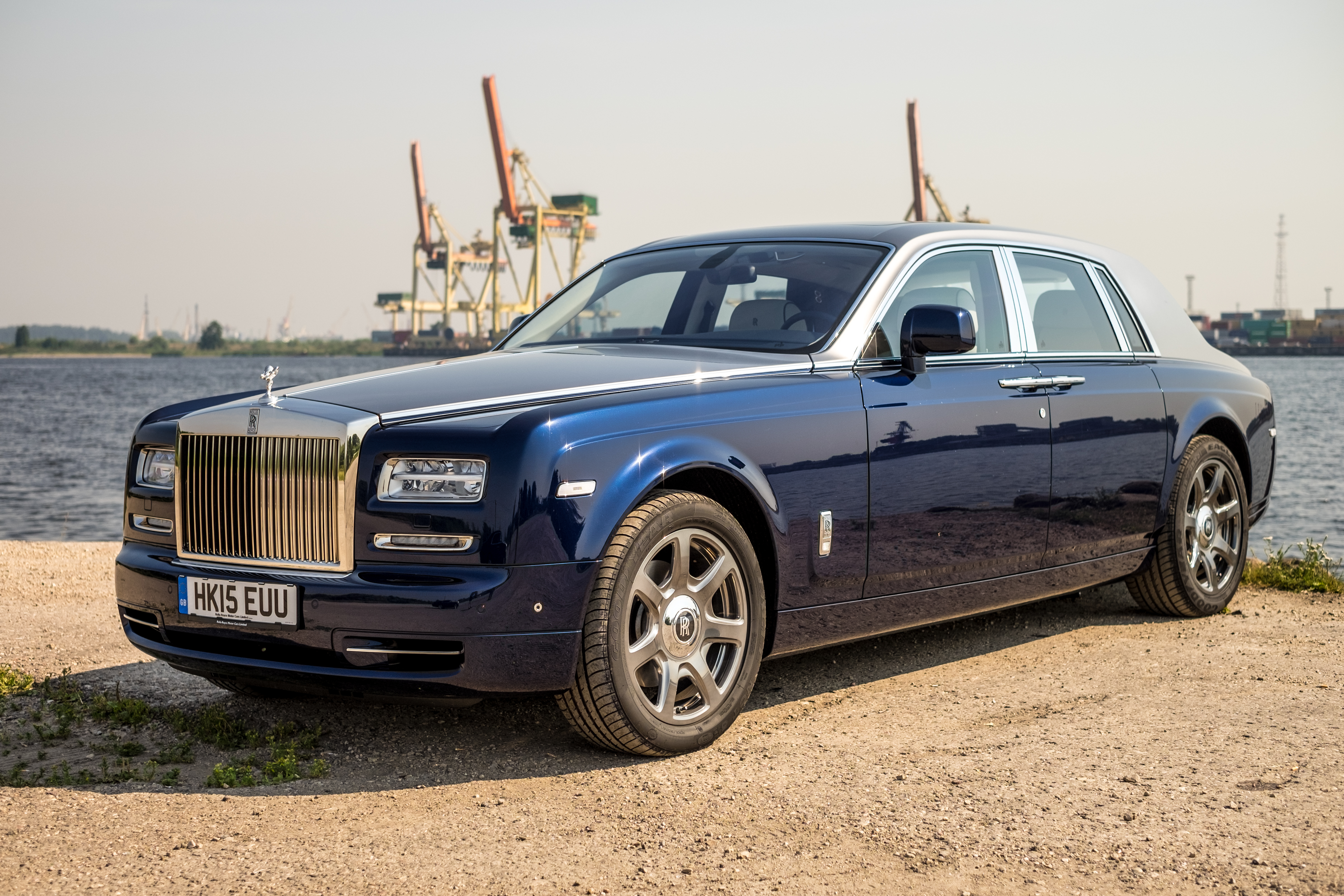
  Rolls-Royce Phantom VII Series II
- 2005–2016 – Rolls-Royce Phantom Extended Wheelbase. This car's wheelbase is 250 mm longer than that of the standard Phantom saloon. Just like its shorter counterpart, it also received a facelift of the 2013 model year.
- 2007–2016 – Phantom Drophead Coupé (convertible)
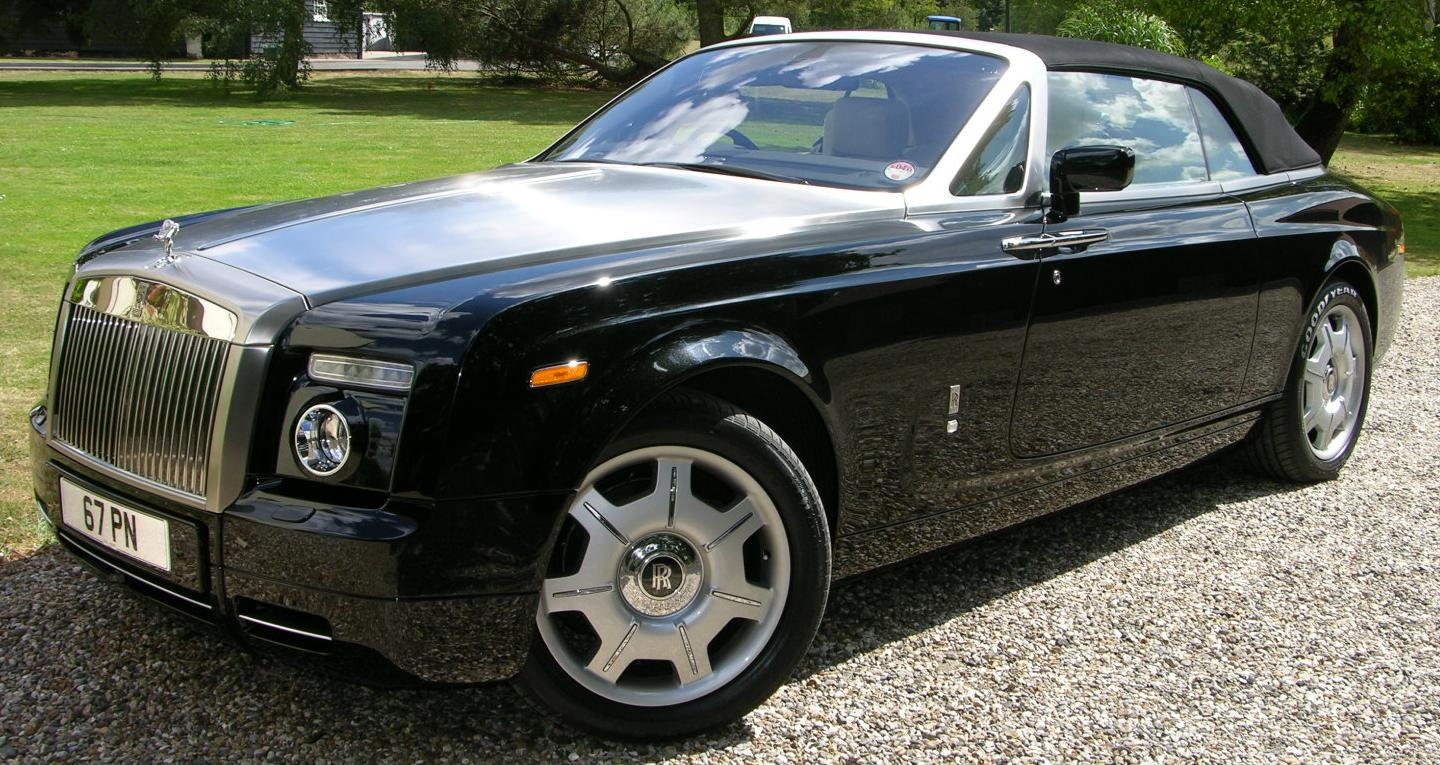
  Rolls-Royce Phantom Drophead Coupé
- 2008–2016 – Phantom Coupé
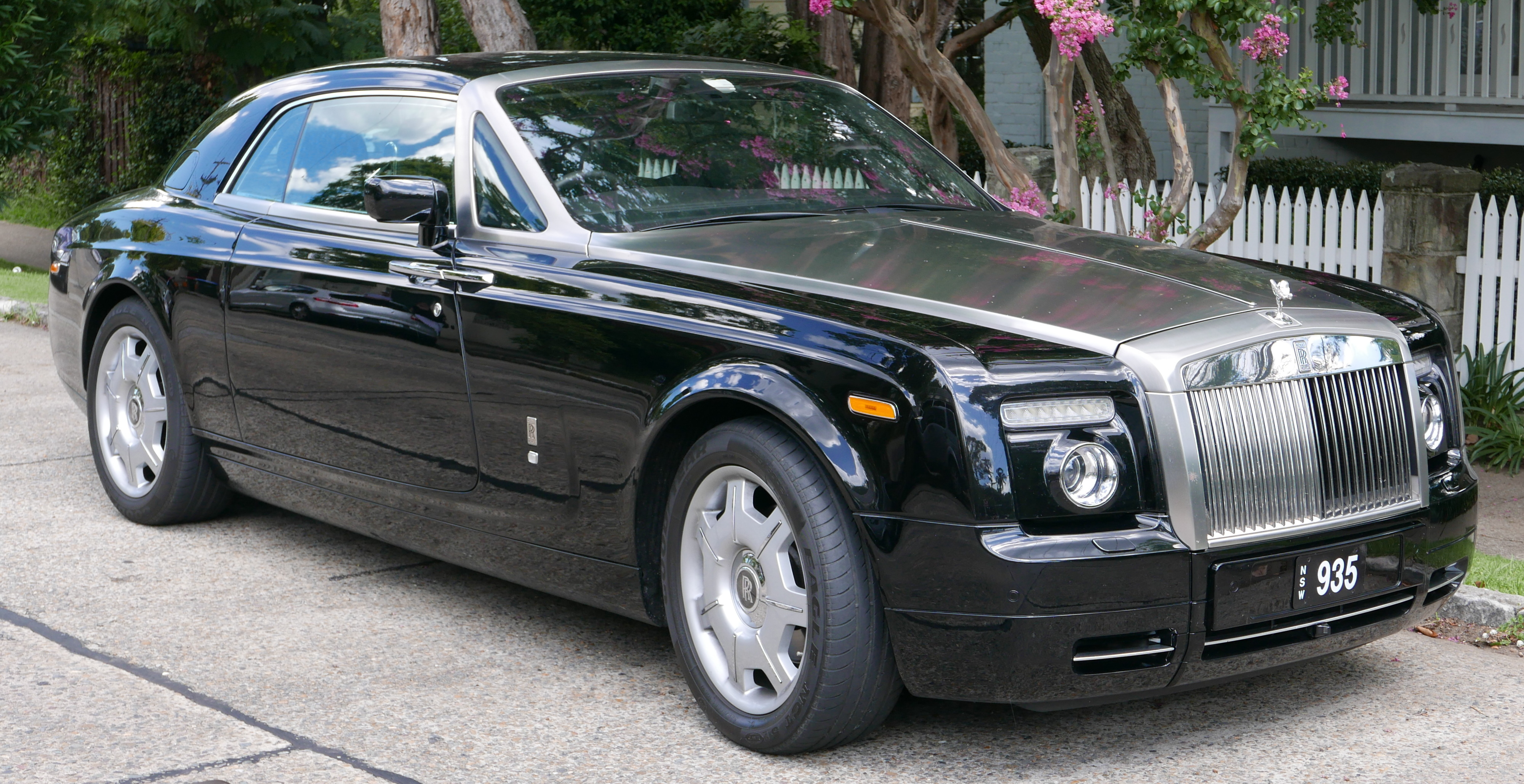
  Rolls-Royce Phantom coupé
- 2017 – Rolls-Royce Sweptail was a one-off custom Phantom Coupé sold for $12.8 million after a 4-year build making it the most expensive new car ever sold at the time.

==== Ghost (First Generation) ====
- 2010–2020 – Rolls-Royce announced in September 2006 that it would develop a new four-door model named Ghost. The Ghost will be smaller than the previous Rolls-Royce automobile launched, the Phantom. Only 20% of the components would be sourced from BMW F01 7 Series and it will be positioned below the Phantom VII.
- On 4 March 2014, the new Ghost Series II was revealed to the public at the Geneva Motor Show. It has a facelift front with new LED headlights. The interior has had an update as well.
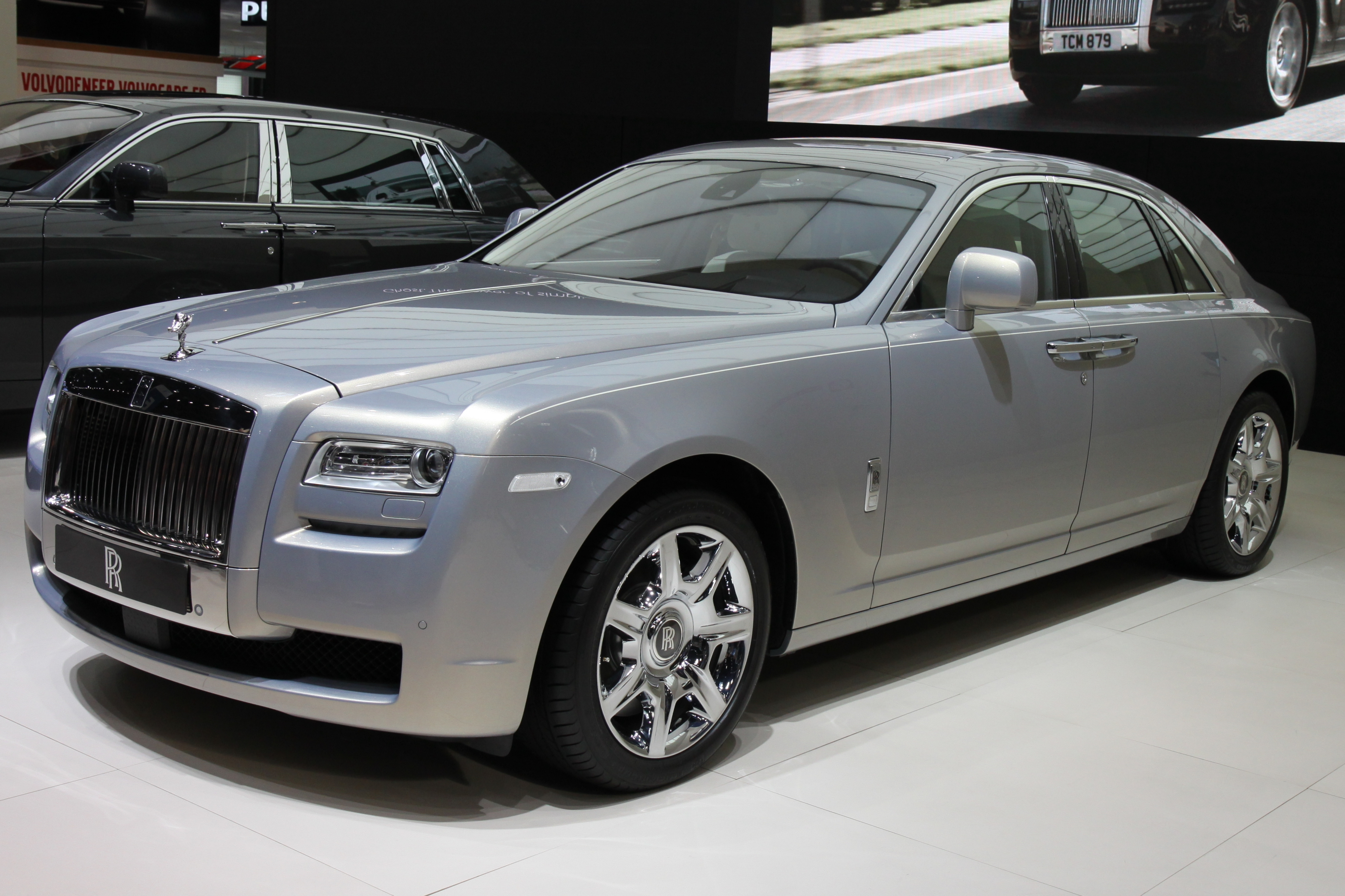
  Rolls-Royce Ghost Series I

==== Dawn ====
- 2015–2023 – Dawn 4-seater convertible. It was announced in time for the 2015 Frankfurt Motor Show.
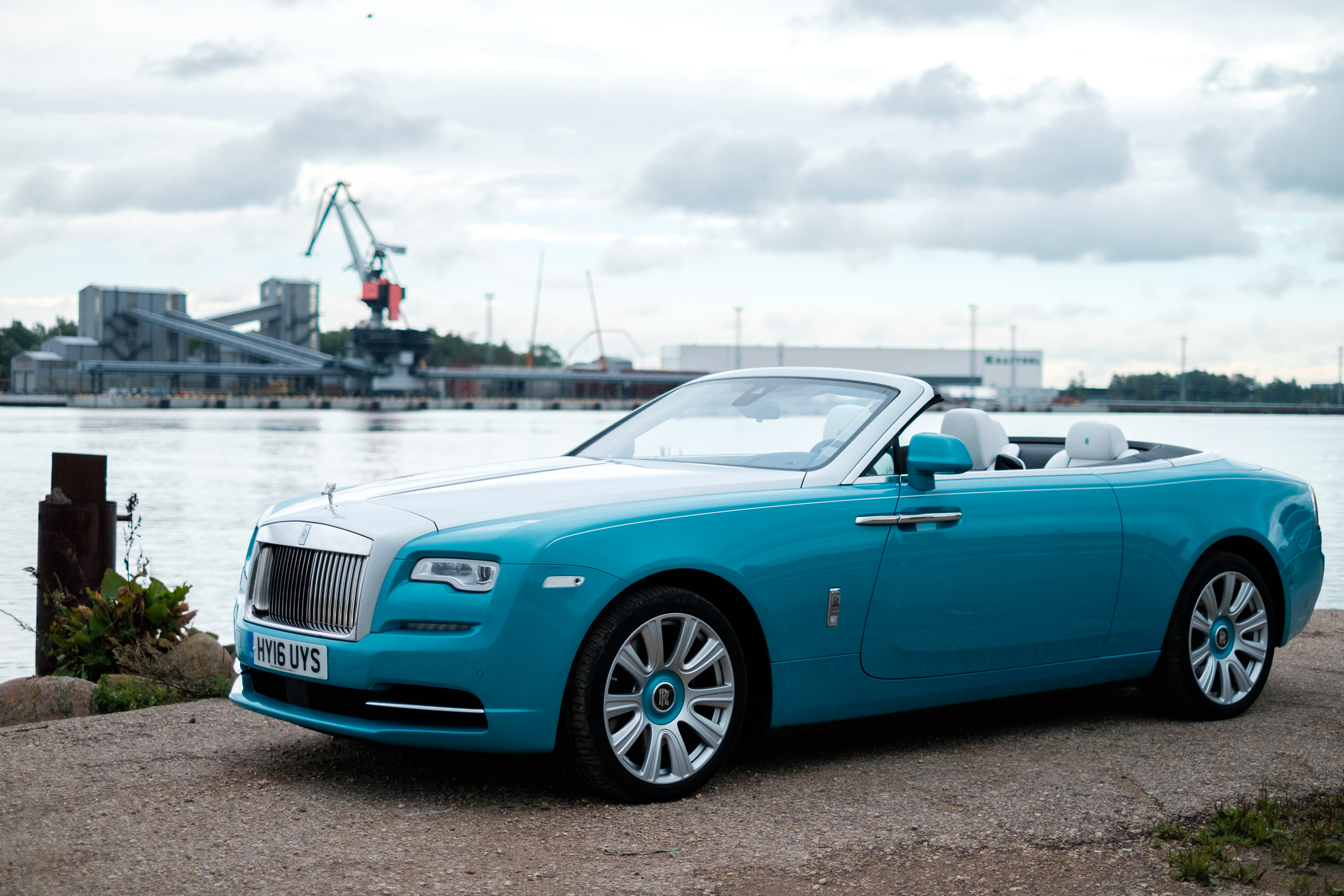
  Rolls-Royce Dawn

==== Wraith ====
- 2013–2022 – Wraith coupé. Rolls-Royce Motor Cars launched a new car at the Geneva Motor Show on 5 March 2013. The new car, named the Rolls-Royce Wraith (in honour of the original Wraith built by the original Rolls-Royce Limited from 1938 to 1939) is a luxury coupe, with a long bonnet and a sleek roof line, and is a coupe version of the Ghost. It is powered by a 623 bhp, twin-turbocharged V12 engine connected to an eight-speed gearbox. It is the fastest car made by Rolls-Royce Motor Cars. Deliveries were expected to begin by the end of 2013. Rolls-Royce had stated that the Wraith would be the most powerful Rolls-Royce motor car to that date.
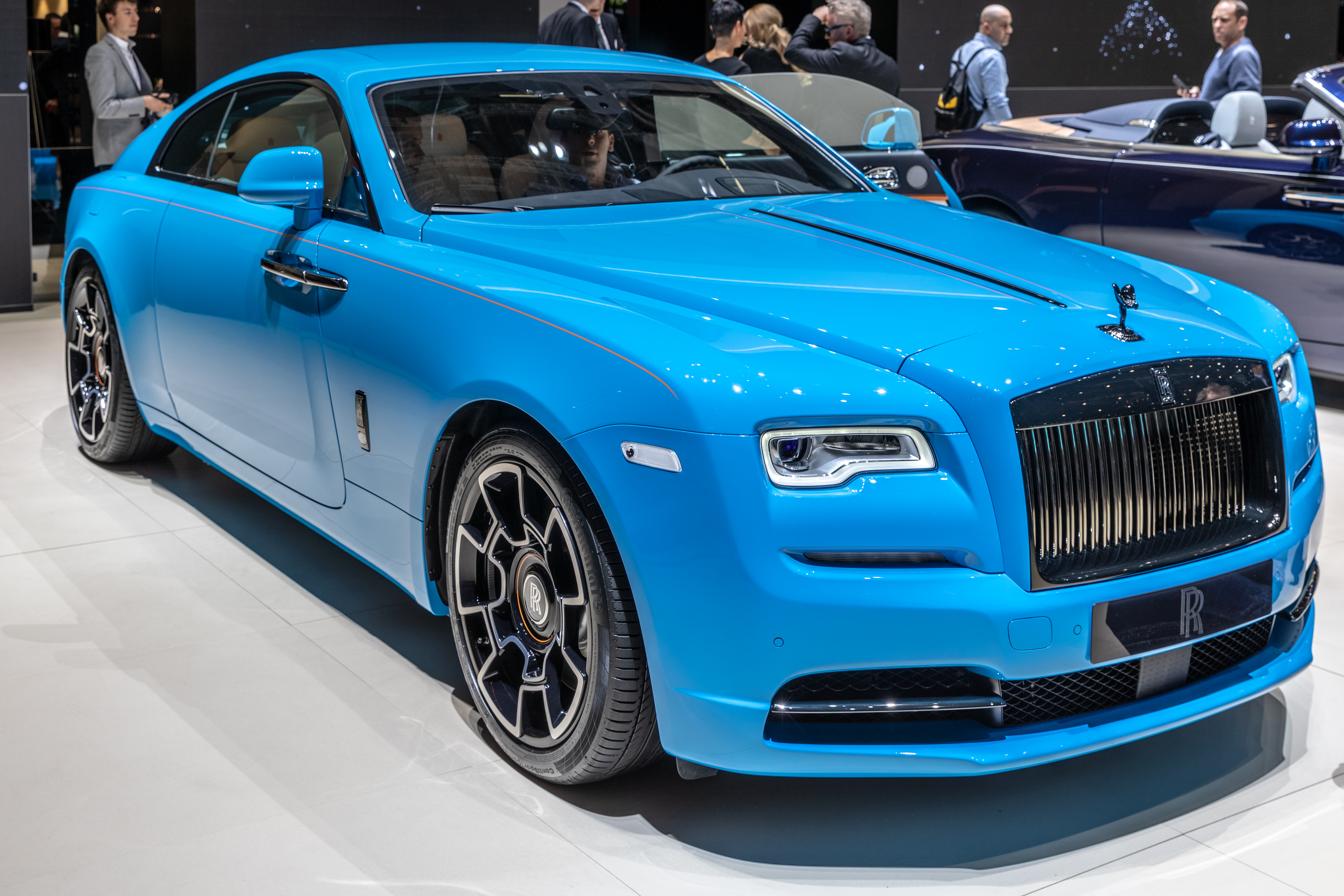
  Rolls-Royce Wraith Black Badge

=== Concept vehicles ===
- Rolls-Royce 100EX (2006)
- Rolls-Royce 101EX (2006)
- Rolls-Royce Hyperion (2008; known as Pininfarina Hyperion)
- Rolls-Royce Mini (June 2009)
- Rolls-Royce 200EX (2009; known as ″RR04″ also)
- Rolls-Royce 102EX (2010)
- Rolls-Royce 103EX (2016)
- Rolls-Royce Boat Tail (2021) is a custom-built concept car based on its predecessor, the Sweptail. Production is limited to three vehicles, two of which have since been revealed.
- Rolls-Royce Droptail (2023) is currently Rolls-Royce's latest coachbuilt project. Production is limited to four models, three of which have since been revealed.
- Rolls-Royce Project Nightingale (2026) is the first series of models from Rolls-Royce's Coachbuild Collection. Production is limited to 100 cars.

== Sales ==
Rolls-Royce Motor Cars achieved its highest-ever annual sales of 6,032 cars in 2023, exceeding the previous record set in 2022.

Calendar year	Total sales
2005	796
2006	805
2007	1,010
2008	1,212
2009	1,002
2010	2,711
2011	3,538
2012	3,575
2013	3,630
2014	4,063
2015	3,785
2016	4,011
2017	3,362
2018	4,107
2019	5,152
2020	3,756
2021	5,586
2022	6,021
2023	6,032
2024	5,712
2025	5,664

== Charity ==
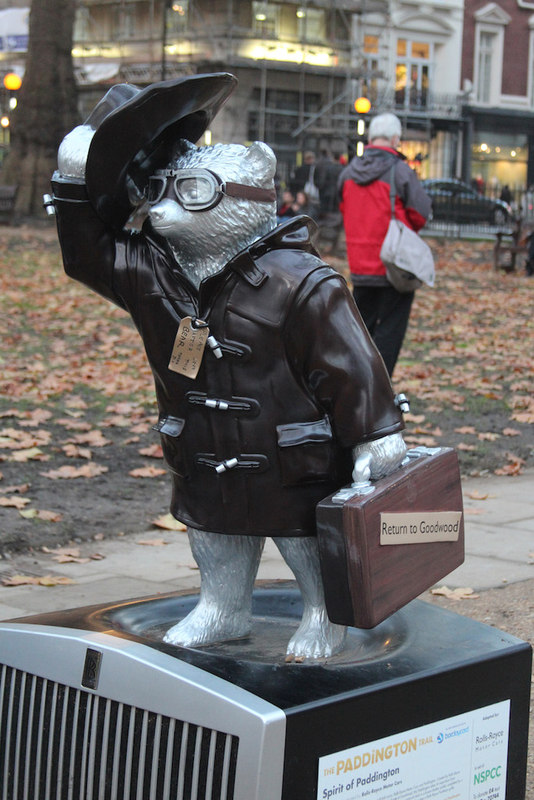
The Rolls Royce-themed Paddington Bear statue auctioned for the NSPCC

In 2014, the company designed a silver coloured Rolls-Royce-themed Paddington Bear statue—"The Spirit of Paddington"—which was located in Berkeley Square Gardens (one of fifty located around London prior to the release of the film Paddington) and was auctioned to raise funds for the National Society for the Prevention of Cruelty to Children (NSPCC).

== See also ==
- List of Rolls-Royce motor cars
- List of car manufacturers of the United Kingdom
