= Rolls-Royce Droptail =

Car model introduced in 2023

Overview
- Manufacturer: Rolls-Royce Motor Cars
- Production: 2023 (Total of 4, all built and sold)
- Assembly: Goodwood Plant, West Sussex, England
- Designer: Alex Innes (Head of Coachbuild Design), Simon Haynes (Exterior), Can Karaismail (Exterior), Pellumb Gurra (Interior)

Body and chassis
- Class: Full-size ultra-luxury coach build
- Body style: Cabriolet
- Layout: FR Layout
- Platform: Architecture of Luxury platform

Powertrain
- Engine: 6.75 N74B68 twin-turbocharged V12 (petrol)

Dimensions
- Wheelbase: 3,772 mm (148.5 in)
- Length: 5,300 mm (208.7 in)
- Width: 2,000 mm (78.7 in)

The Rolls-Royce Droptail is a full-sized luxury coach built grand tourer car produced by Rolls-Royce Motor Cars. It was introduced in August 2023 and is set to be produced with four variations.

The Droptail succeeds the Boat Tail as the most expensive new car in the world with an estimated price of more than $32 million - rivaling the costs of the most expensive cars sold at auction. Like the Boat Tail, some variants include clocks that can be removed and worn as watches.

== History ==
The Droptail was presented on 18 August 2023, at Monterey Car Week during the Pebble Beach Concours d'Elegance. The Droptail was presented in its "La Rose Noire" version, each of the four models receiving a different name, color and interior.

The car's first sketches were drawn four years prior to release.

== Specifications ==
The styling of the cars take cues from yachts, classic Rolls-Royce roadsters, and 1930s hot rods from the West Coast of the United States, with additional styling and engineering cues taken from the world of horology.

The first variation introduced is La Rose Noire, named for the French Black Baccara rose. The car includes black sycamore wood sourced from France, and features a Audemars Piguet watch.

The second variant is Amethyst. The name and styling draw inspiration from amethyst, the birthstone of the owner's son. It features a Vacheron Constantin watch and actual amethyst stones.

The third variant is Arcadia. The name refers to a location in Greek mythology that's supposed to represent heaven on earth. It features a Rolls-Royce branded clock that was designed over the course of two years.

The Droptail uses a new monocoque chassis instead of the aluminium spaceframe chassis mainly used in the other vehicles. It is thus not based on the Architecture of Luxury platform. It is powered by a twin-turbocharged 6.75-litre N74B68 V12 engine, which is a variant of BMW's N74.
