= Boat tail =

Boat tail may refer to:

- Stern, the rearmost part of a boat or ship
- Trailer tail or boat tail, an aerodynamic device affixed to semi-trailer trucks to improve fuel economy
- Boat tail (ballistics), a tapered base on a non-powered projectile designed to reduce drag
- Rolls-Royce Boat Tail, a car made by BMW Rolls-Royce to resurging the old boat tail character
