= Rolls-Royce Spectre =

British luxury electric vehicle

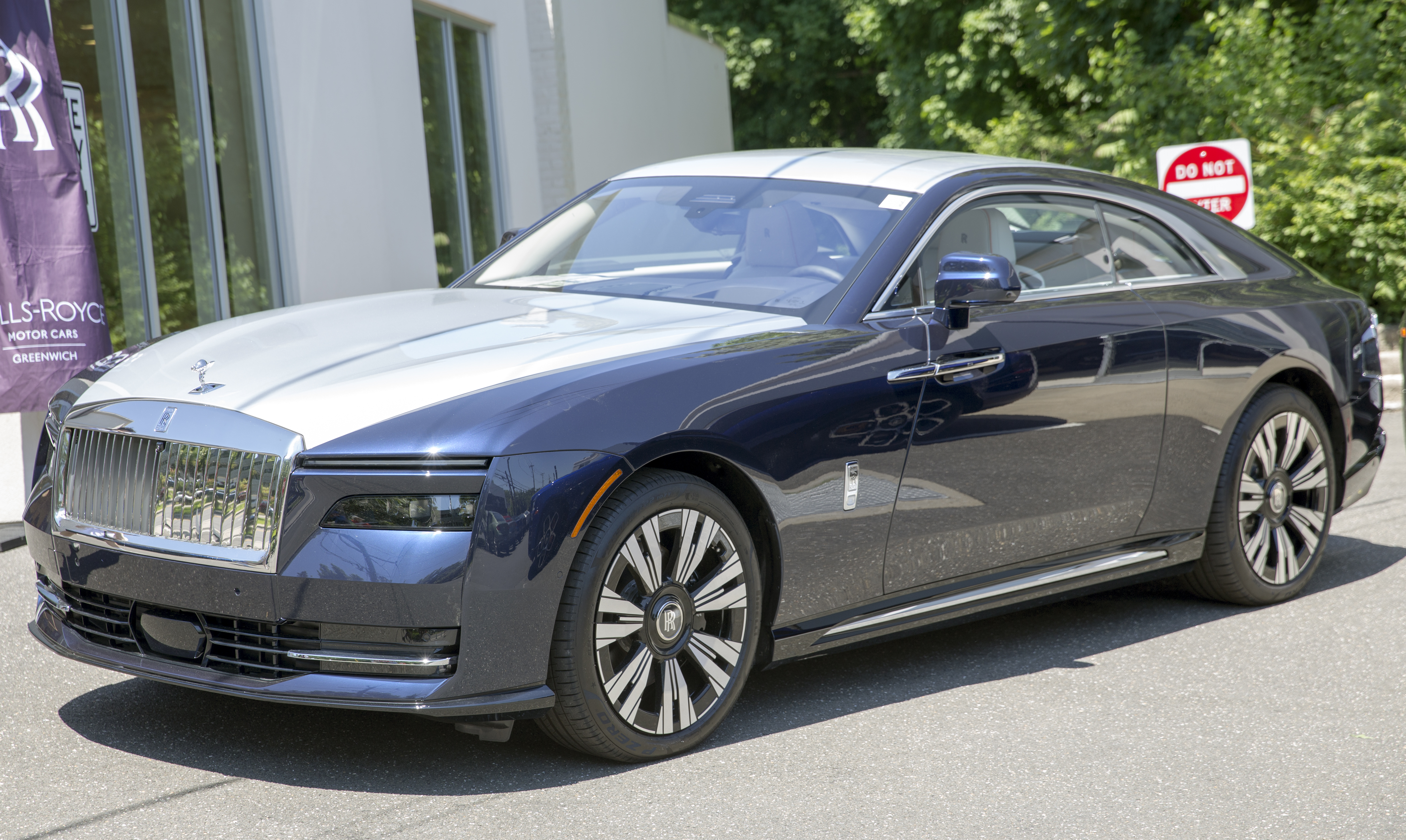

Overview
- Manufacturer: Rolls-Royce
- Production: 2023–present
- Model years: 2024–present
- Assembly: United Kingdom: West Sussex, England (Goodwood plant)
- Designer: Jan Rosenthal

Body and chassis
- Class: Full-size ultra-luxury car (F); Grand tourer (S)
- Body style: 2-door coupe
- Layout: Dual-motor all-wheel-drive
- Platform: Architecture of Luxury
- Related: Rolls-Royce Phantom VIII; Rolls-Royce Cullinan

Powertrain
- Electric motor: 2× BMW eDrive Separately Excited Synchronous Motors (SSMs)
- Power output: Standard: 430 kW (577 hp; 585 PS); 900 N⋅m (664 lb⋅ft); Black Badge: 485 kW (650 hp; 659 PS); 1,075 N⋅m (793 lb⋅ft); Standard (Series II): 442 kW (593 hp; 601 PS); 900 N⋅m (664 lb⋅ft); Black Badge (Series II); 500 kW (671 hp; 680 PS); 1,100 N⋅m (811 lb⋅ft)
- Electric range: 264–291 mi (425–468 km) (EPA); 321 mi (517 km) (WLTP); 391 mi (629 km) (Series II) (WLTP)

Dimensions
- Wheelbase: 3,210 mm (126.4 in)
- Length: 5,453 mm (214.7 in)
- Width: 2,080 mm (81.9 in)
- Height: 1,559 mm (61.4 in)
- Kerb weight: 2,903–2,975 kg (6,400–6,559 lb)

Chronology
- Predecessor: Rolls-Royce Wraith (2013)

The Rolls-Royce Spectre is a full-sized luxury electric grand tourer manufactured by Rolls-Royce Motor Cars. The Spectre was formally launched in Napa Valley, California in 2023. The first deliveries of the car were made in the last quarter of 2023.

It is Rolls-Royce's first electric vehicle (EV) and rides on the same platform as the Phantom and Cullinan.

== Overview ==
The Rolls-Royce Spectre has an EPA range of 264 miles (425 km), and WLTP range of 321 miles (517 km). It has a drag coefficient of 0.25, making it the most aerodynamic production model Rolls-Royce has ever built.

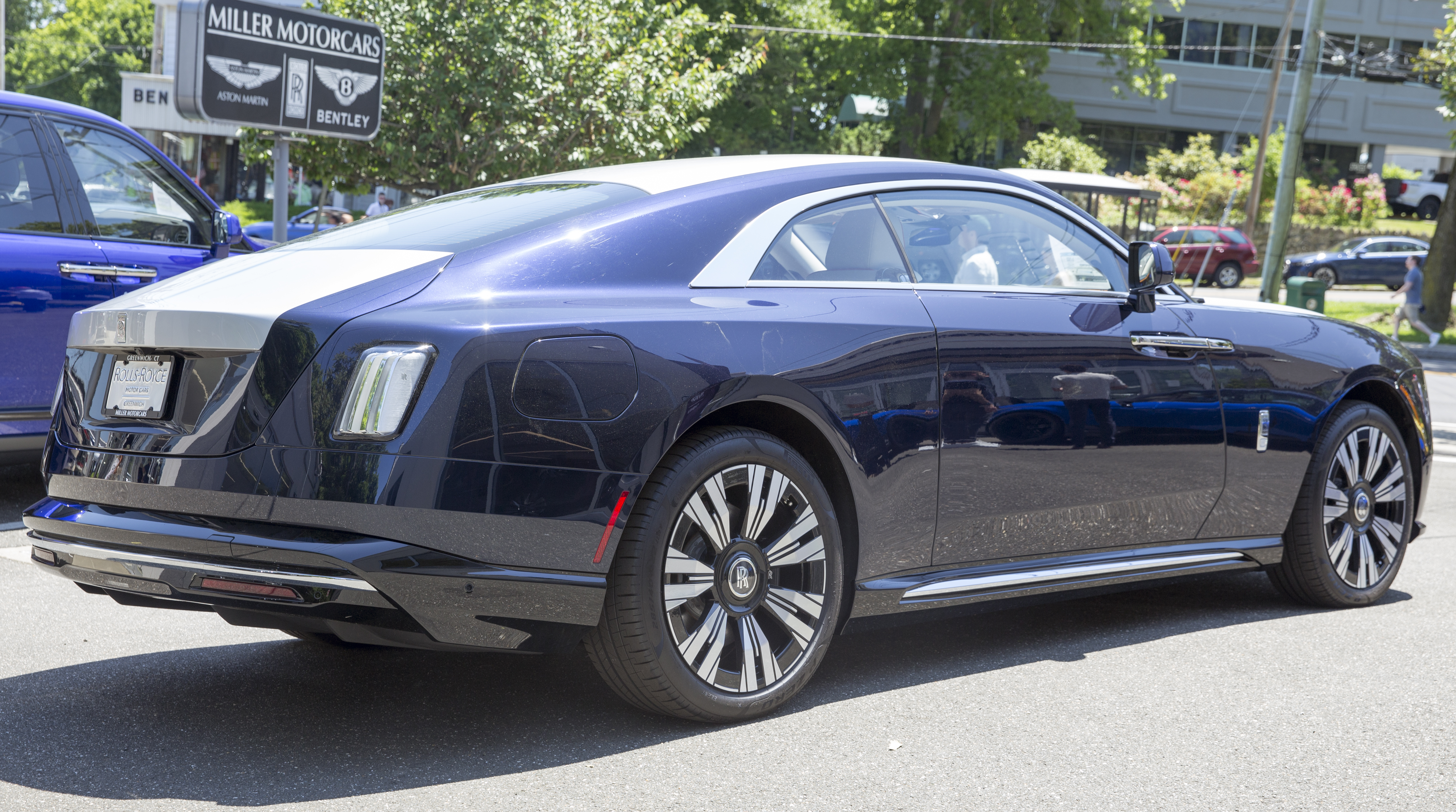
Rear view

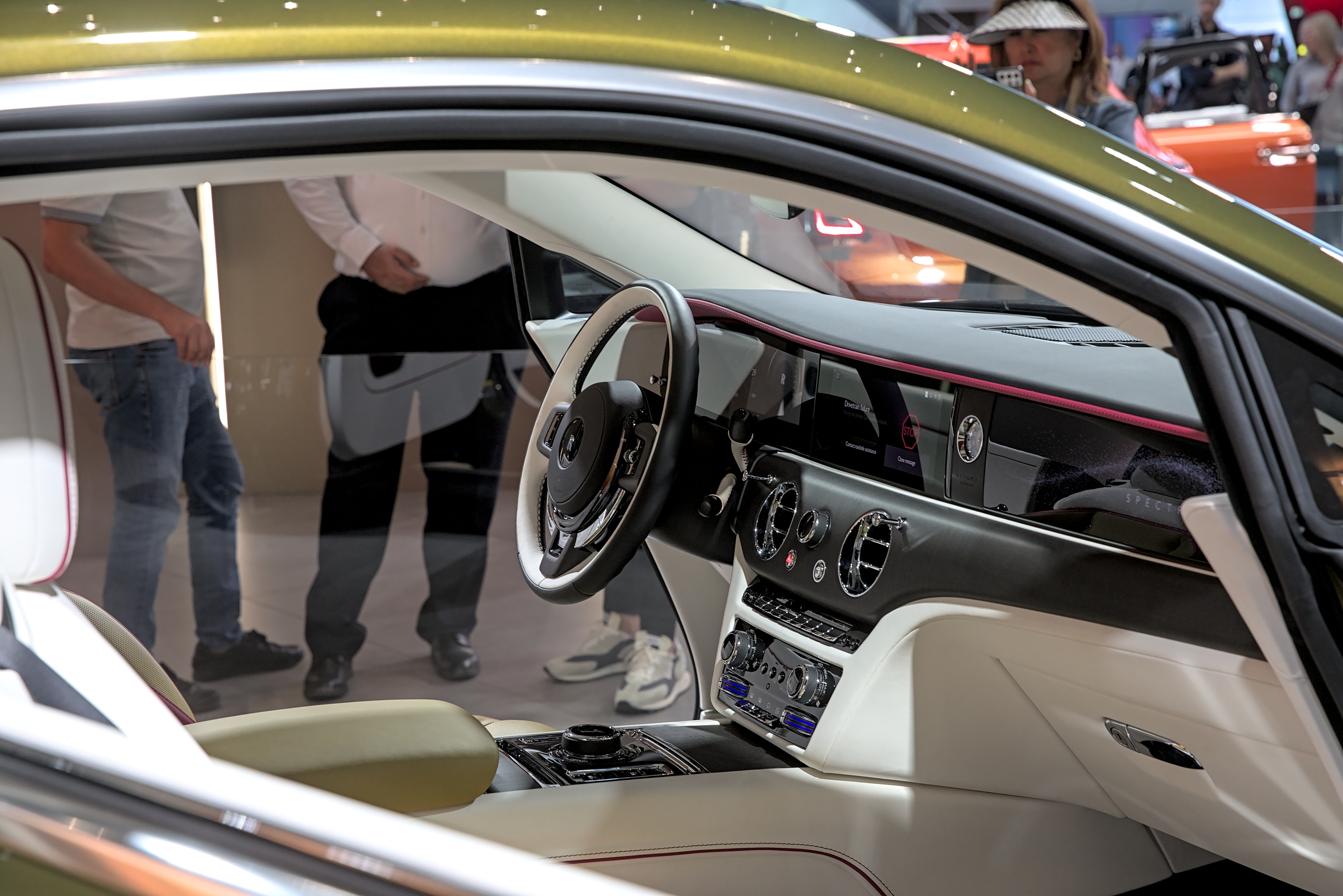
Interior

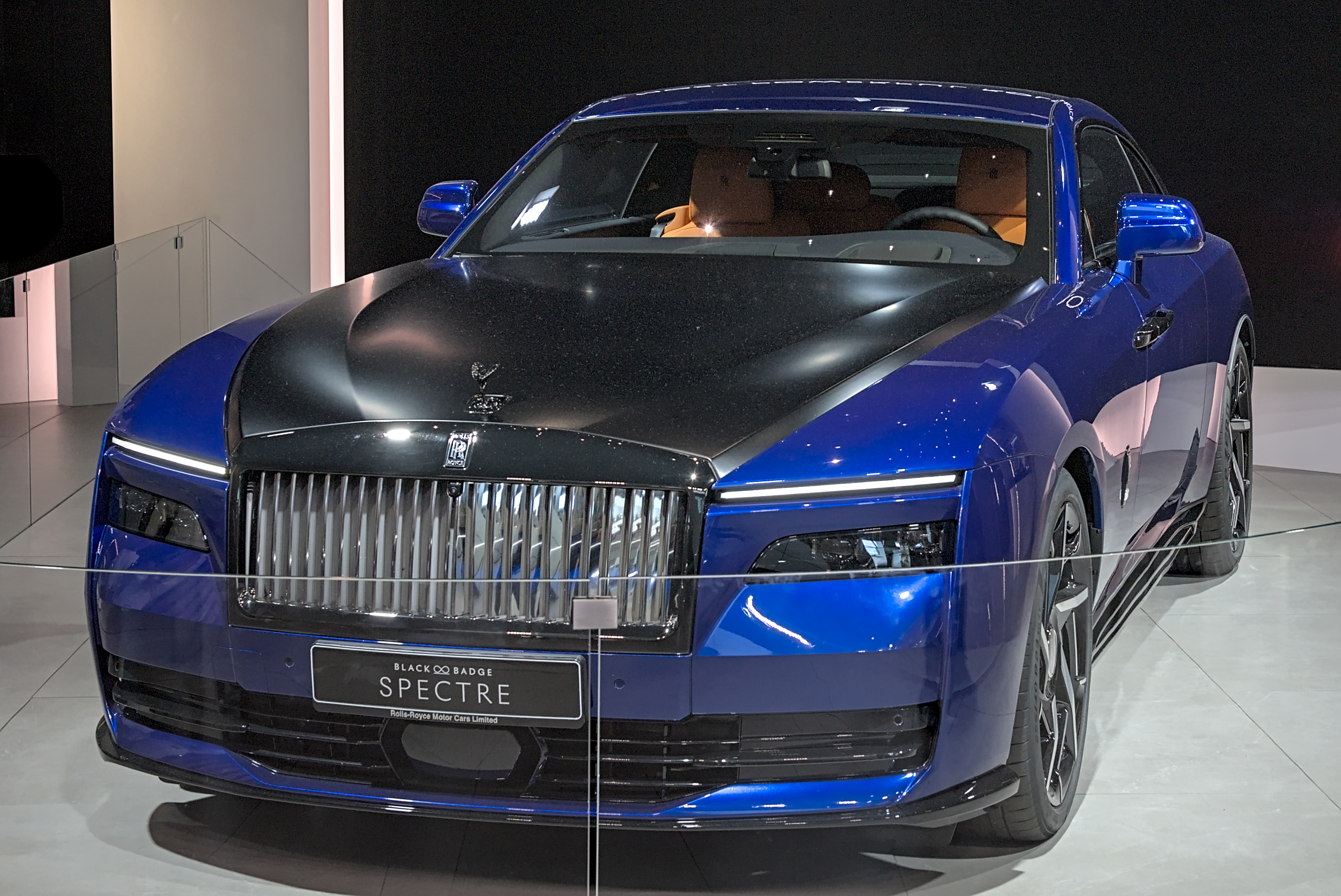
Black Badge

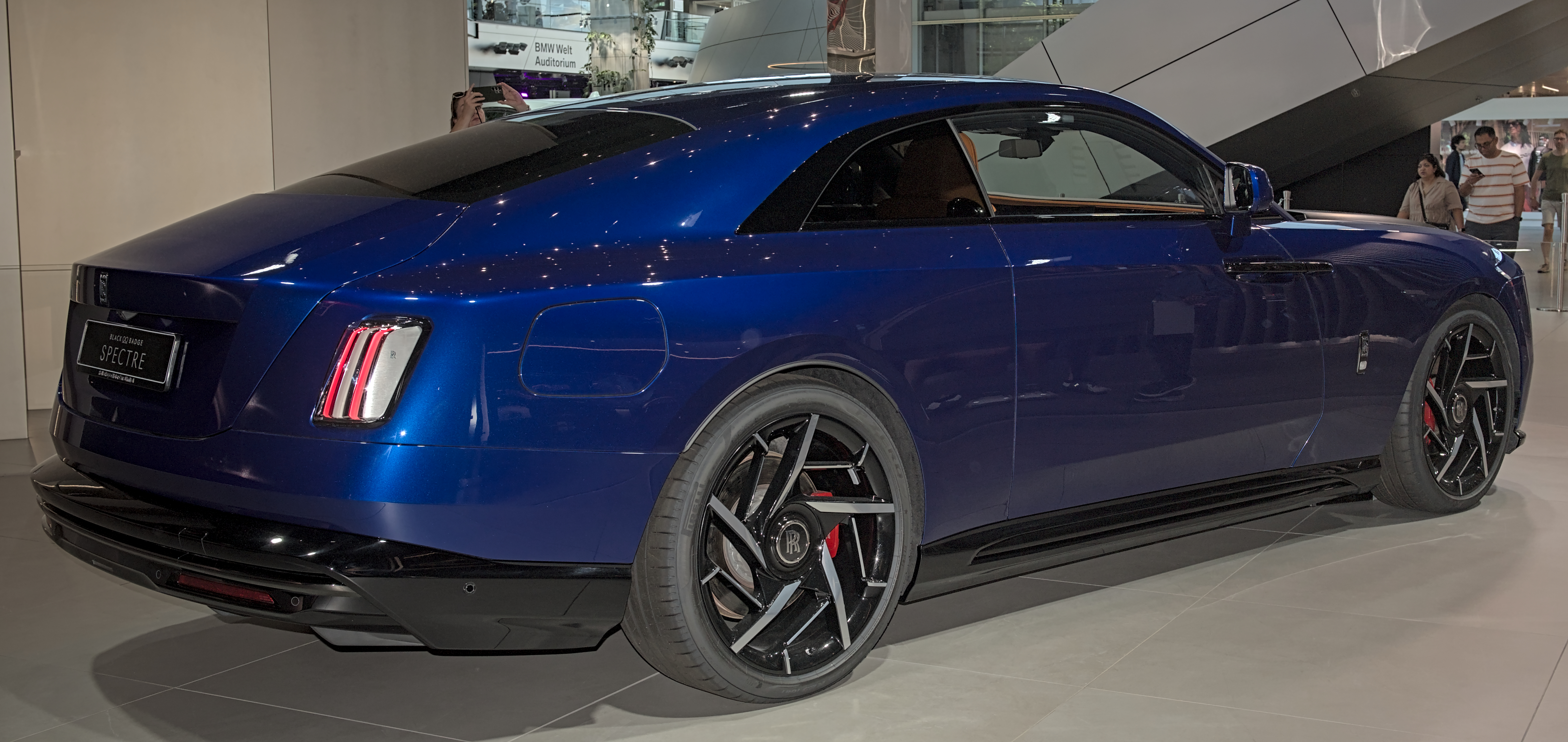
Rear view

The Spectre has a redesigned version of Rolls-Royce's signature bonnet ornament, the Spirit of Ecstasy. Rolls Royce says the flowing robes of the ornament were reshaped to be more realistic and are lower, making the ornament more aerodynamic. The new ornament stands 83 mm (3.3 in) tall, compared to the predecessor's 100 mm (3.9 in), and bringing it closer to the earlier examples. The redesigned ornament will appear on future Rolls Royce models.

== History ==
In September 2021, Rolls-Royce announced the Spectre and confirmed that testing had commenced. On 18 October 2022, the marque unveiled the Spectre through its social media channels. The Spectre follows a long-time tradition at Rolls-Royce of giving their models supernatural monikers.

The Spectre was launched at a press event at Napa Valley in the San Francisco Bay Area during the summer of 2023. Emma Begley, Rolls-Royce Director of Global Communications explained that the reasoning for the location was California's status as a luxury hub, and the US being the largest market for Rolls-Royce. She notes that Napa was also a symbolic choice: "This is the place where history and the old order of the wine world have been rewritten... you can make a fabulous Rolls-Royce without our V12 in front of it.

A single custom commissioned variant called the Spectre Semaphore was unveiled at the 2024 Monterey Car Week. The car is named after its special Semaphore Yellow paint, with the colour being inspired by the varied terrains of California.

=== Series II ===
On 2 June 2026, Rolls-Royce announced Spectre Series II, introducing a suite of technical and creative enhancements to the marque’s landmark super-coupé.
