= Novitec Group =

German automotive tuning company

Novitec GmbH & Co. KG
- Type: GmbH & Co. KG (private)
- Industry: Automotive (car tuning)
- Founded: 1989; 37 years ago
- Founder: Wolfgang Hagedorn
- Headquarters: Stetten, Bavaria, Germany
- Key people: Wolfgang Hagedorn (Managing Director)
- Products: Aerodynamic components, forged wheels, exhaust systems, suspension systems, widebody conversions
- Brands: Novitec, N-Largo, Spofec
- Website: www.novitecgroup.com

Novitec GmbH & Co. KG (trading as Novitec Group) is a German automotive tuning company headquartered in Stetten, Bavaria. Founded in 1989 by Wolfgang Hagedorn, the company develops performance, aerodynamic and styling modifications for high-performance sports and luxury automobiles.

Originally focused on Italian marques, Novitec's current programs concentrate on Ferrari, Lamborghini, McLaren and Rolls-Royce vehicles. The company is known for its carbon-fiber aerodynamic components, forged wheels, suspension and exhaust systems, and limited-production widebody conversions marketed under the N-Largo designation.

Novitec Group Headquarters

== History ==
Novitec Rosso - Novitec Group

Novitec Group Headquarters

Novitec Automobile GmbH was founded in 1989 by Wolfgang Hagedorn in Stetten, Germany, initially specializing in modifications for Italian automobile manufacturers, including Fiat, Alfa Romeo, Ferrari and Lamborghini.

During the 2000s, the company became increasingly recognized for its Ferrari programs, marketed under the Novitec Rosso label. Early projects included twin-supercharged conversions based on the Ferrari 360 Modena and Ferrari F430, which received extensive engine, suspension and aerodynamic modifications.

In 2007, Novitec introduced Novitec Tridente, a division dedicated to Maserati vehicles. In July 2013, the company launched Novitec Torado for Lamborghini models, debuting with a program for the Lamborghini Aventador that included a twin-supercharger conversion producing up to 969 hp.

In 2014, Novitec established Spofec, a brand dedicated to Rolls-Royce motor cars. The name is derived from "Spirit of Ecstasy", the hood ornament of Rolls-Royce vehicles; the division's first project was based on the Rolls-Royce Ghost, followed by programs for the Wraith and later models.

In 2016, Novitec presented its first program for a McLaren vehicle, based on the McLaren 570S, expanding the company's portfolio beyond Italian marques and Rolls-Royce.

== Divisions and brands ==
Novitec has marketed its programs under several marque-specific labels:

- Novitec Rosso – Ferrari
- Novitec Tridente – Maserati (introduced 2007)
- Novitec Torado – Lamborghini (introduced 2013)
- Spofec – Rolls-Royce (introduced 2014)

Current vehicle programs concentrate on Ferrari, Lamborghini, McLaren and Rolls-Royce; former programs included products for Fiat, Alfa Romeo and Maserati models.

Divisions and brands - Novitec Group

== Products and modifications ==
Novitec develops performance and styling components for complete vehicle conversions, typically comprising carbon-fiber aerodynamic components developed in wind-tunnel testing, forged wheels (partly developed with the American manufacturer Vossen), sport springs and suspension systems with front-lift function, high-performance exhaust systems, engine-management modifications and interior customization.

Wind Tunnel

== N-Largo ==
N-Largo is the designation used by Novitec for its limited-production widebody programs. These conversions typically feature widened carbon-fiber bodywork, revised aerodynamic components, forged wheels, lowered suspension and engine modifications, and are produced in strictly limited numbers.

The first N-Largo, based on the Ferrari F12berlinetta, was presented in 2013 with an output of 774 hp and a top speed of over 340 km/h. Subsequent N-Largo programs include:

- Ferrari F12berlinetta N-Largo and N-Largo S
- Ferrari 812 Superfast N-Largo (limited to 18 units) and N-Largo S (limited to 3 units)
- McLaren 720S N-Largo coupé and Spider (each limited to 15 units)
- Ferrari F8 N-Largo

In 2025, Novitec introduced the Esteso widebody program for the Ferrari Purosangue, the company's first widebody conversion for a Ferrari SUV.
