= Rolls-Royce Wraith (2013) =

British luxury car model

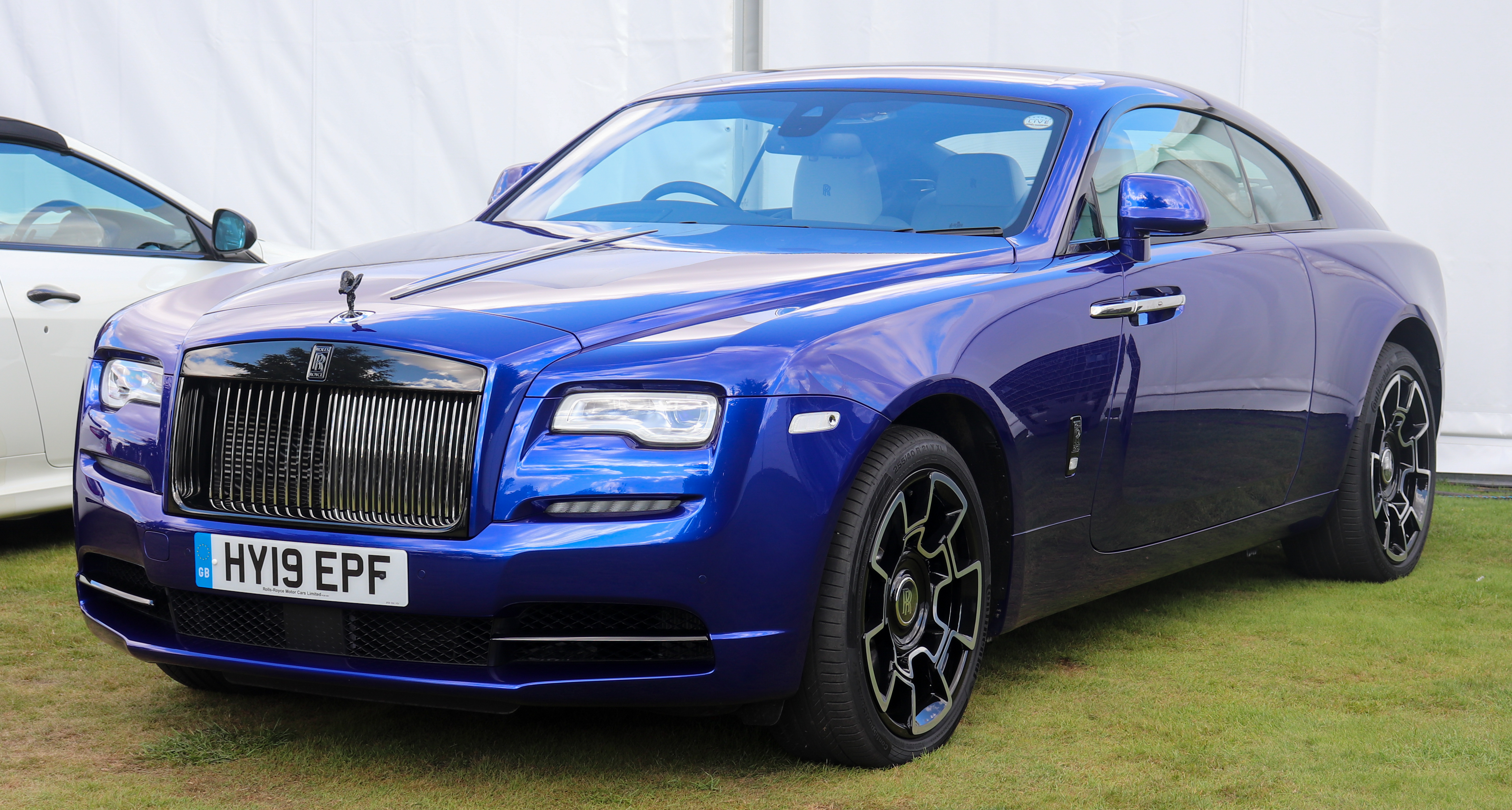

Overview
- Manufacturer: Rolls-Royce Motor Cars
- Production: 2013–2023
- Model years: 2014–2023
- Assembly: United Kingdom: West Sussex, England (Goodwood plant)
- Designer: Exterior: Pavle Trpinac, Andreas Thurner; Interior: Charles Coldham, Matthias Junghanns, Alan Sheppard

Body and chassis
- Class: Full-size ultra-luxury car (F); Grand tourer (S)
- Body style: 2-door hardtop coupé
- Layout: FR layout
- Platform: BMW L6
- Doors: Coach doors
- Related: BMW 7 Series (F01); Rolls-Royce Ghost; Rolls-Royce Dawn

Powertrain
- Engine: 6,592 cc (402.3 cu in) BMW N74 twin-turbo V12
- Transmission: 8-speed ZF 8HP automatic

Dimensions
- Wheelbase: 3,112 mm (122.5 in)
- Length: 5,269 mm (207.4 in)
- Width: 1,947 mm (76.7 in)
- Height: 1,507 mm (59.3 in)
- Kerb weight: 2,440 kg (5,379.3 lb)

Chronology
- Predecessor: Rolls-Royce Phantom Coupé
- Successor: Rolls-Royce Spectre

The Rolls-Royce Wraith is a full-size ultra-luxury car/grand tourer manufactured by Rolls-Royce Motor Cars and based on the chassis of the Rolls-Royce Ghost sedan, which is also shared with the Rolls-Royce Dawn convertible. The Wraith shares its nameplate with the 1938 model by the original Rolls-Royce company.

The body style is a two-door pillar-less coupe with suicide doors. This body style was most popular in cars during the 1950s and 1960s, and was known as the hardtop body style, not used by Rolls-Royce since 1955.

== Overview ==
The Wraith was built in order to replace the earlier 2-door car model, the Phantom Coupé, built on the basis of the Ghost, unlike the earlier model which was based on the 7th Generation Phantom, the flagship car model of Rolls-Royce Motor cars until the arrival of the 8th generation.

== Initial release ==
=== Wraith (2013–2022) ===
The vehicle was announced in January 2013 and unveiled at the 2013 Geneva Motor Show. Deliveries began from the fourth quarter of 2013.

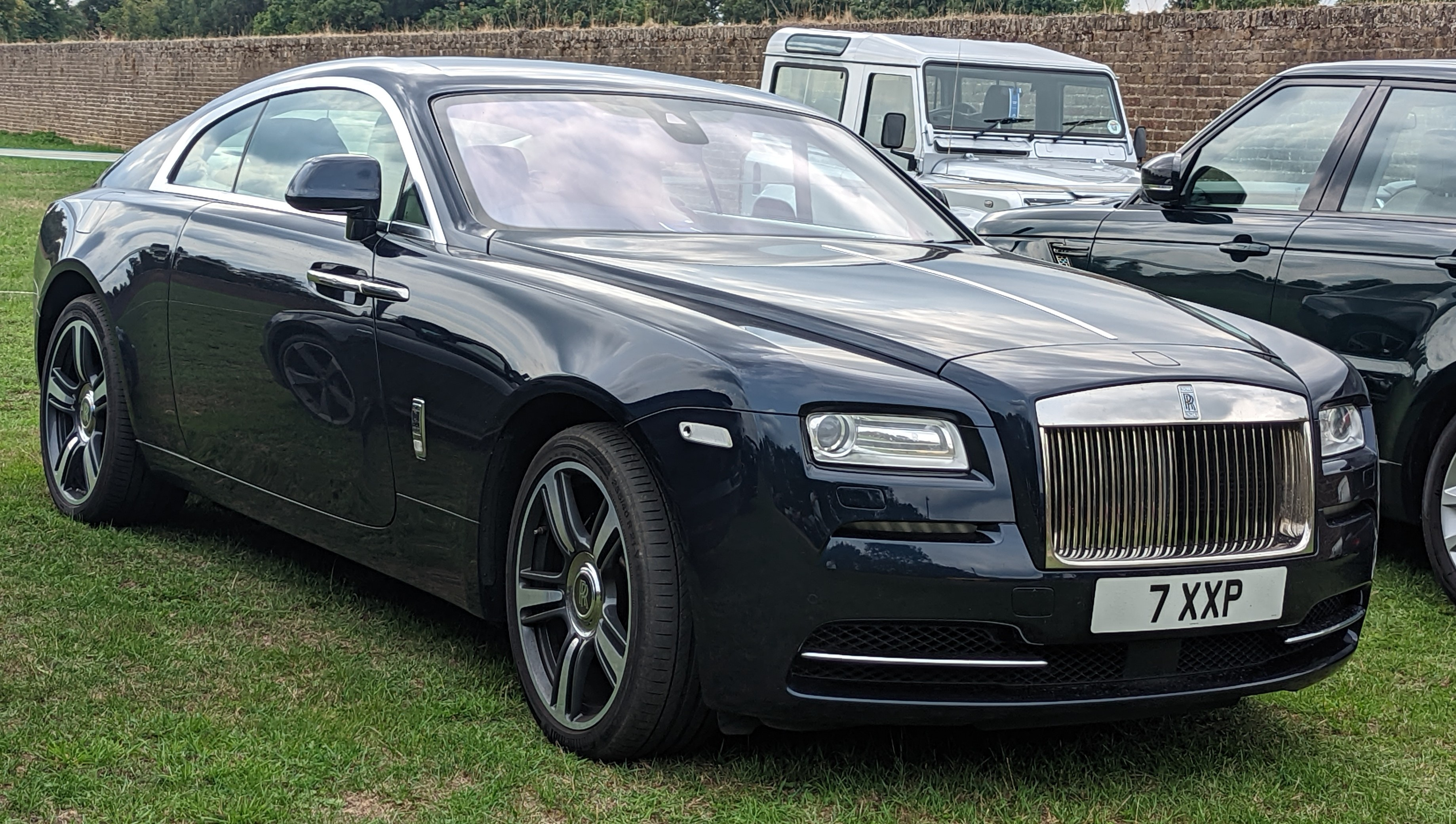
Series I (pre-facelift)

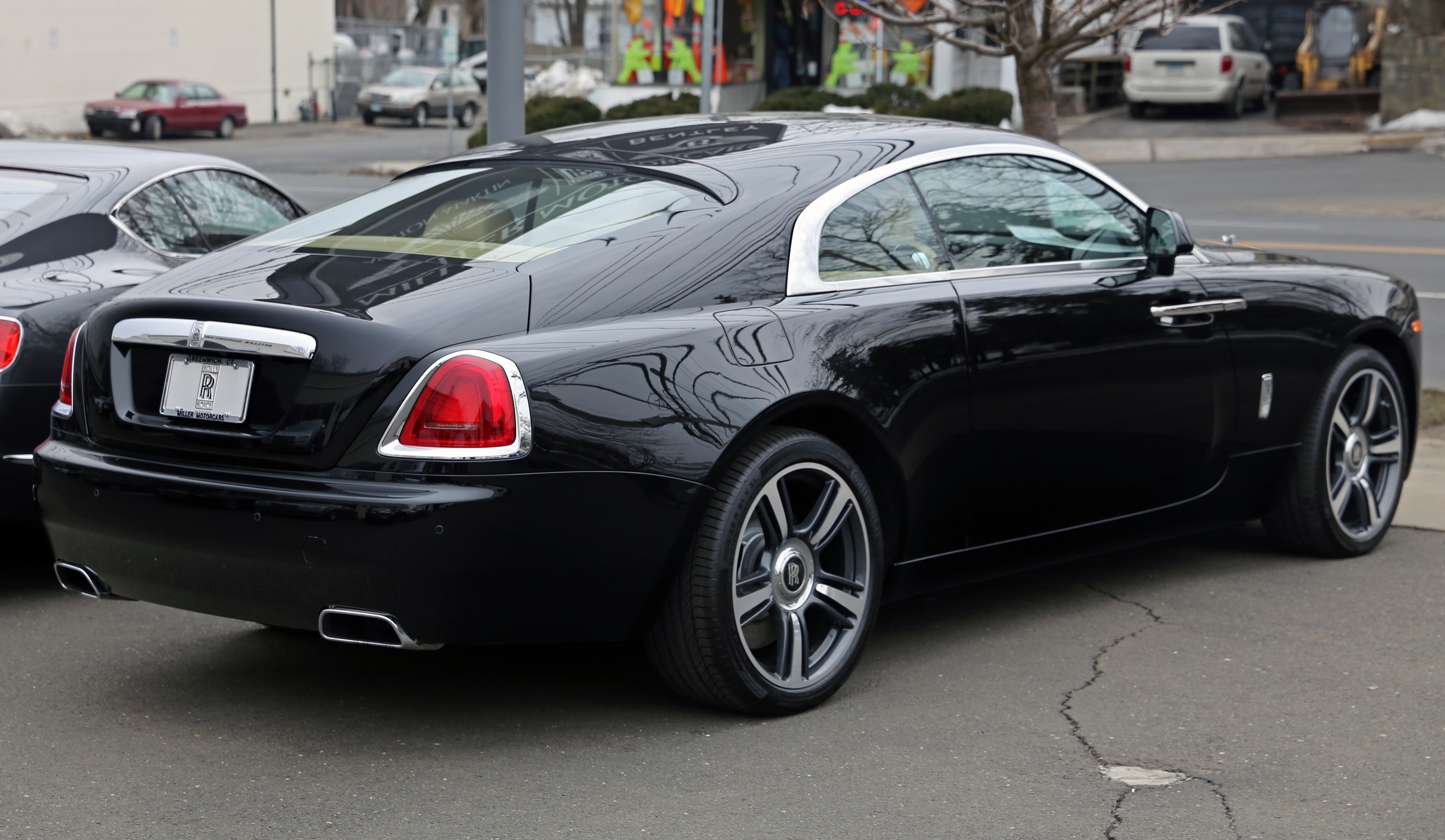
Series I (pre-facelift)

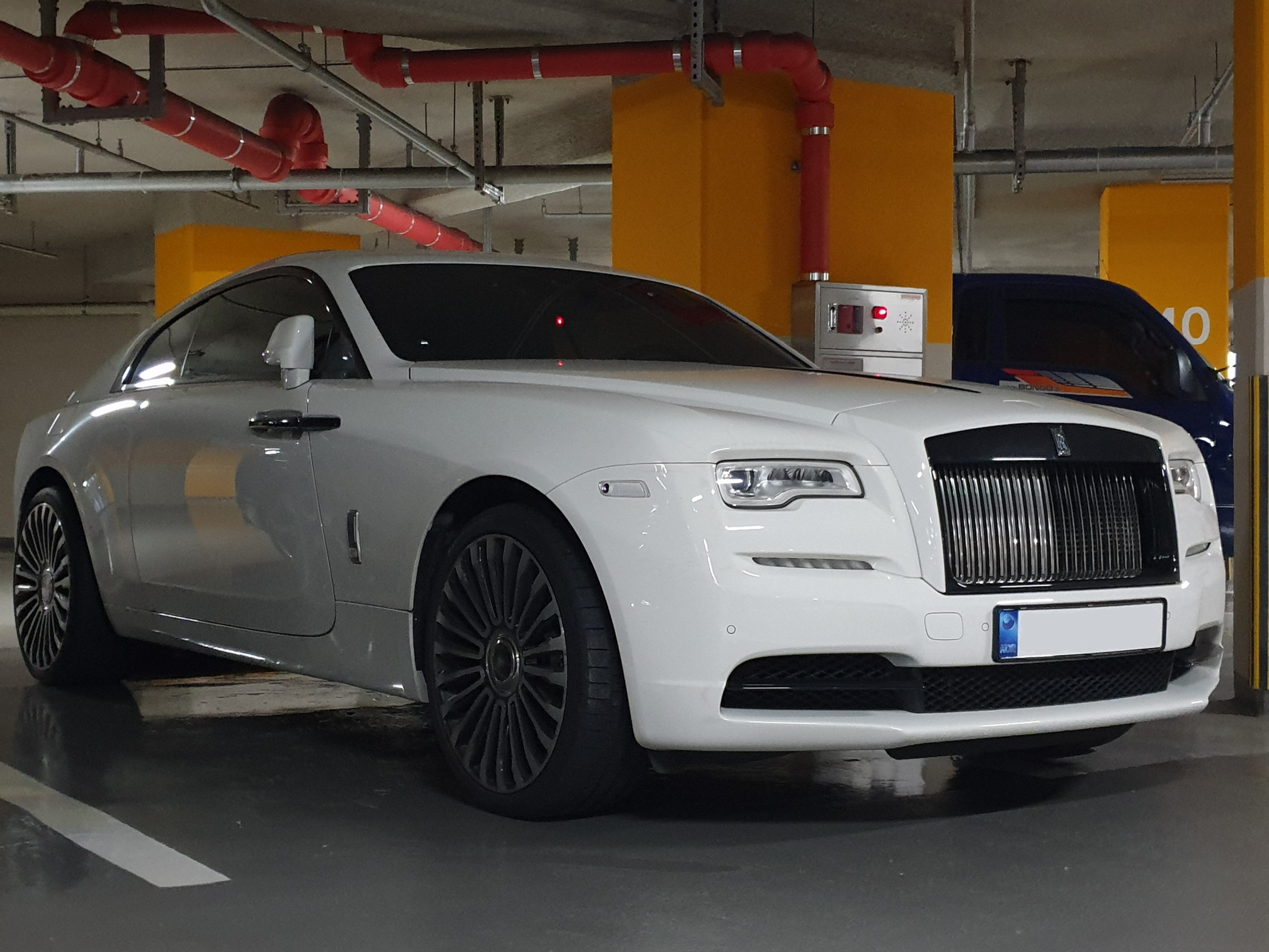
Series II facelift (2017)

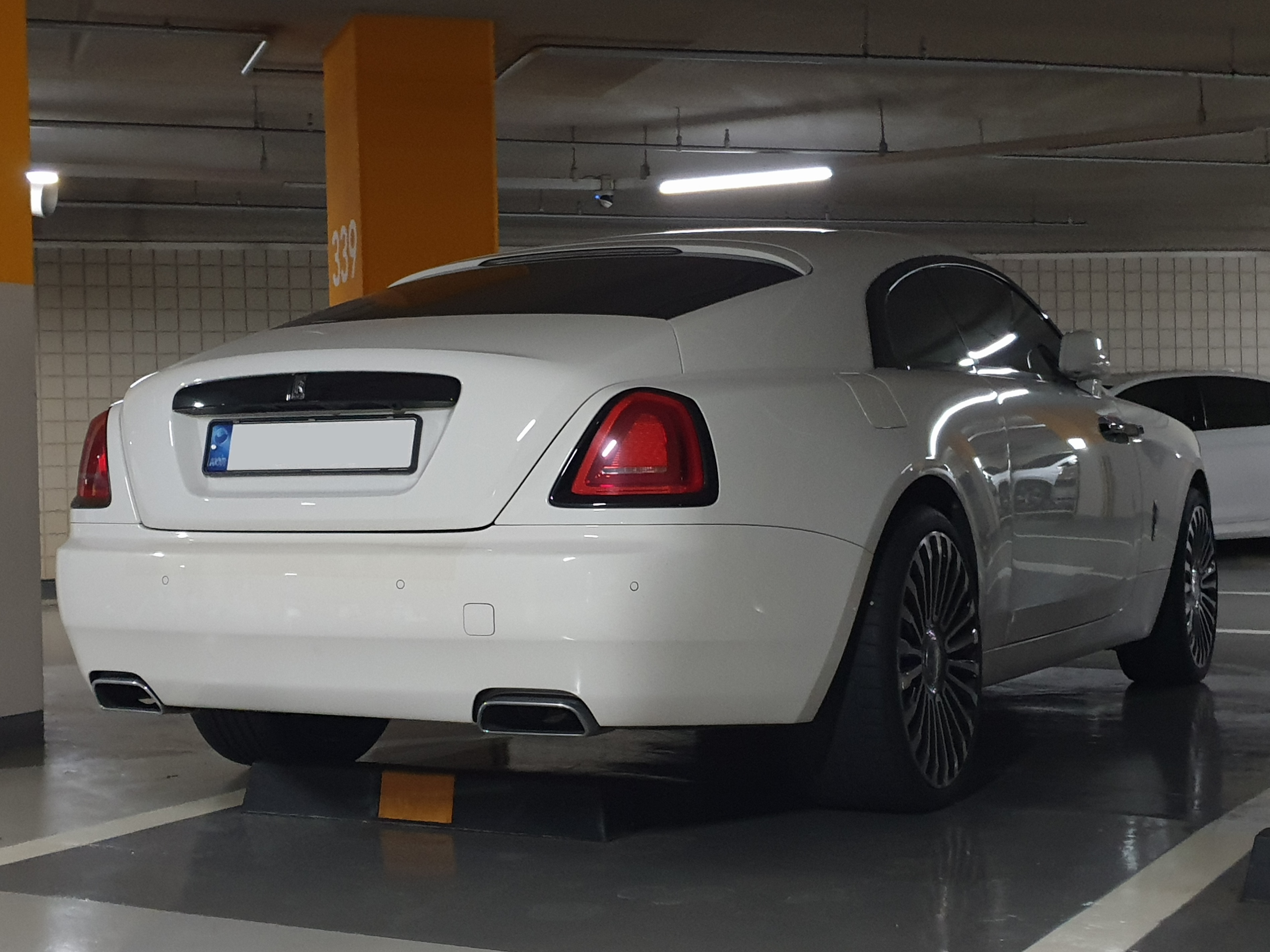
Series II facelift (2017)

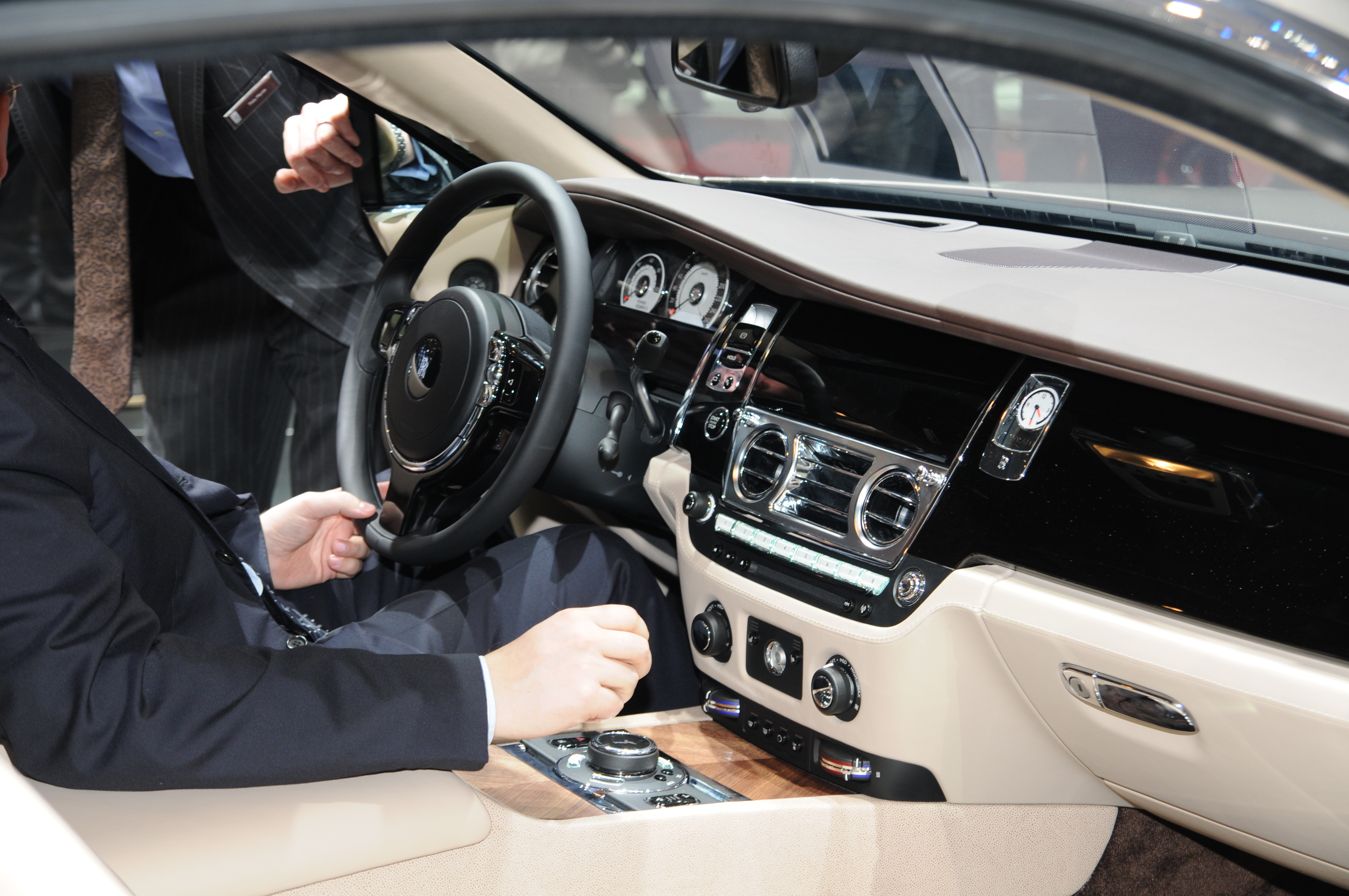
Interior

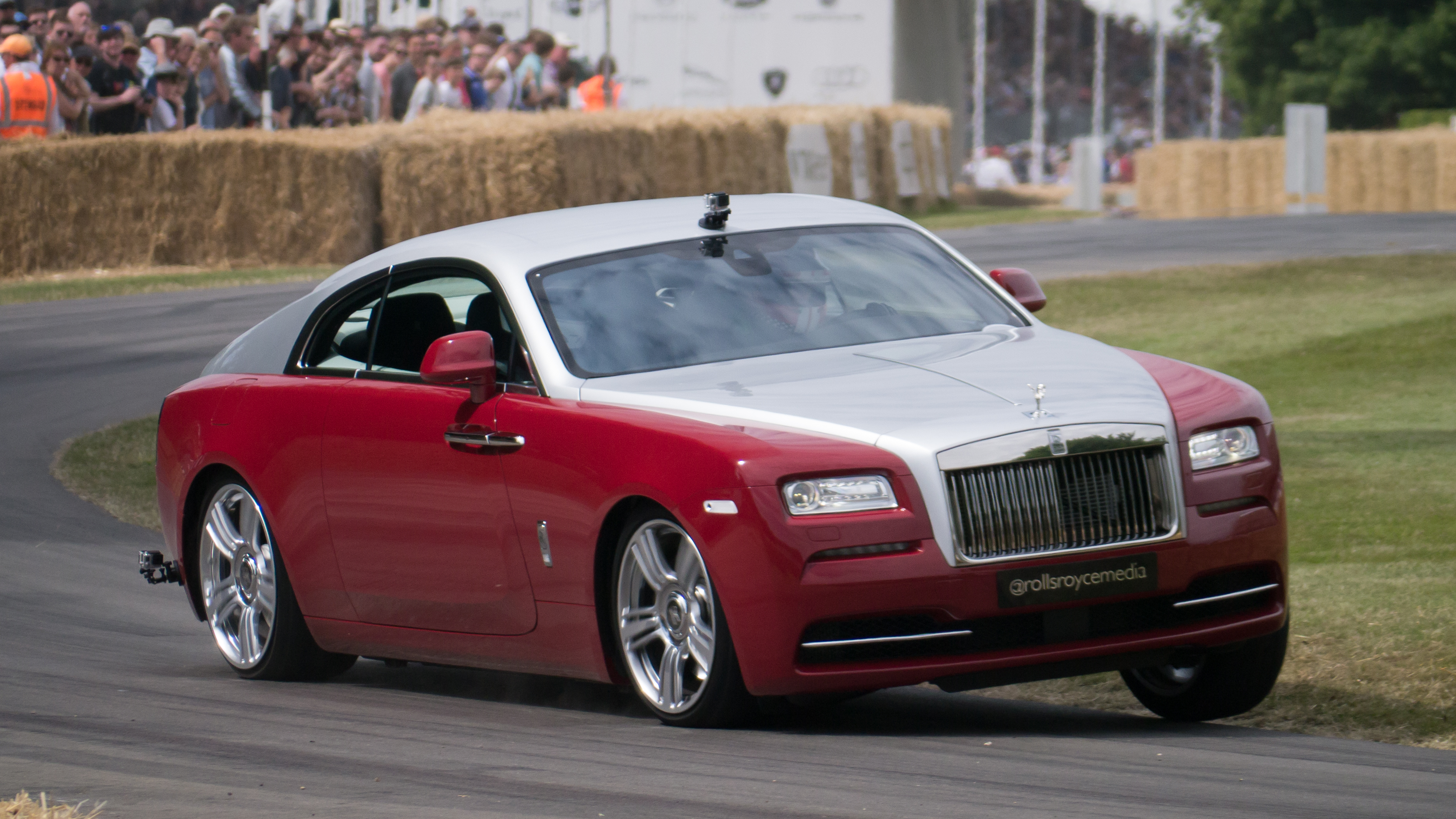
Wraith at the Goodwood Festival of Speed

== Specifications and performance ==
=== Engines ===
Petrol engines
Model	Years	Type/code	Power/rpm, Torque/rpm
Wraith	2013–	6,592 cc (402.3 cu in) V12 twin turbo (N74B66)	632 PS (465 kW; 623 hp)@5600, 800 N⋅m (590 lb⋅ft)@1500–5500
Wraith Black Badge	2016–	6,592 cc (402.3 cu in) V12 twin turbo (N74B66)	632 PS (465 kW; 623 hp)@5600, 870 N⋅m (642 lb⋅ft)@1700–4500

=== Transmissions ===
Petrol engines
Model	Years	Type/code
Wraith	2013–	8-speed automatic (ZF 8HP90)
Wraith Black Badge	2016–	8-speed automatic (ZF 8HP95)

=== Performance ===
The standard Wraith has a 6.6 litre, twin turbocharged V12 engine which delivers 632 PS (465 kW; 623 hp). The car can accelerate from 0 to 60 mph (0 to 97 km/h) in 4.4 seconds, making it the fastest accelerating Rolls-Royce ever produced. The car also has an electronically limited top speed of 250 km/h (155 mph) .

== Variants ==
=== Black Badge ===
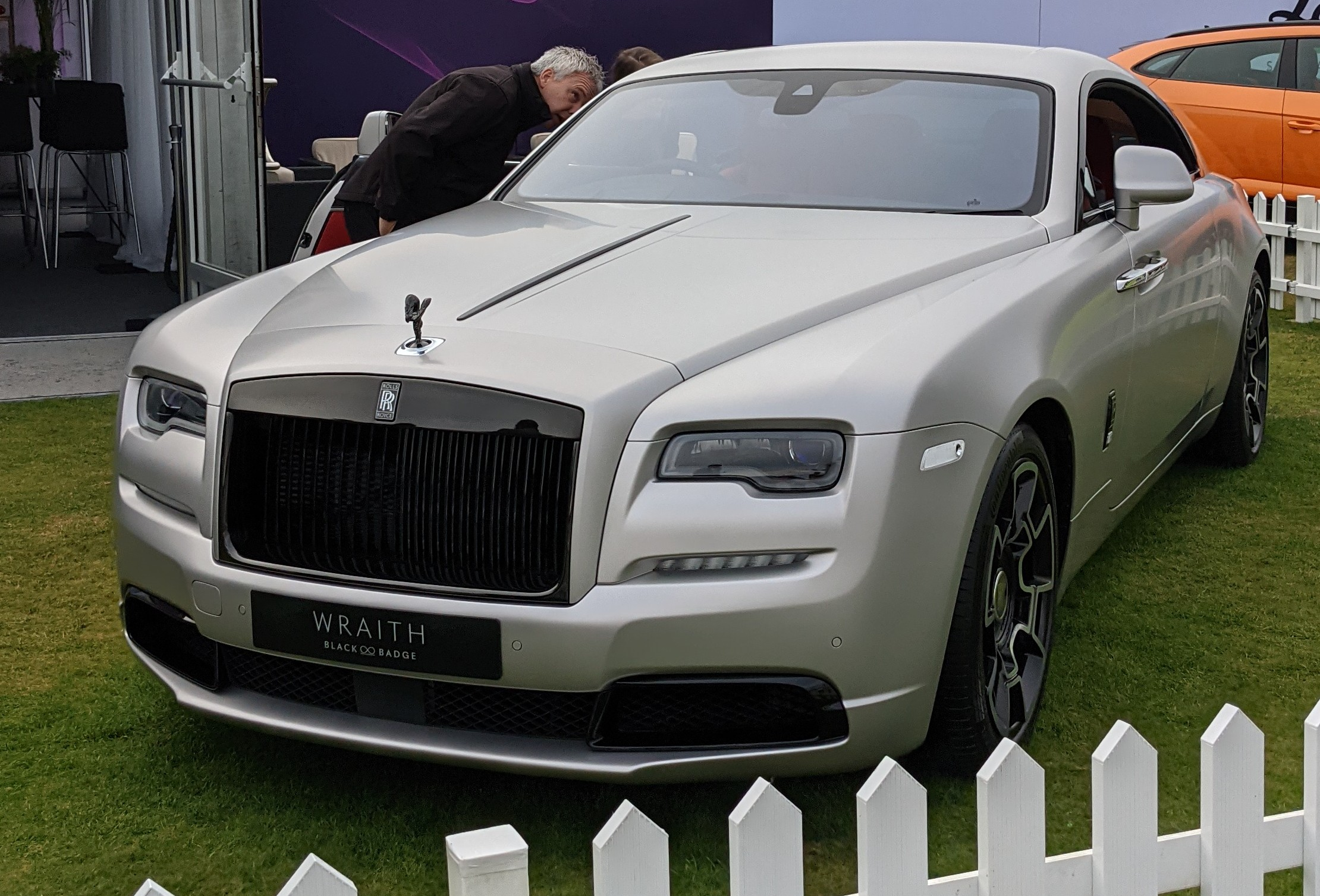
Rolls-Royce Wraith Black Badge

The Wraith Black Badge is a special edition of the Wraith which has been modified for increased performance. Power remains the same as the standard Wraith, but torque has been increased to 870 N⋅m (642 lb⋅ft). It also features reworked suspension and steering, new driveshafts, and a new transmission tune which shifts higher in the rev range. Its exterior features are painted black (including the Spirit of Ecstasy), and its interior consists of carbon fibre applications.

In addition, the Black Badge moniker has been applied to the Rolls-Royce Cullinan and the Rolls-Royce Dawn.

=== Landspeed Edition ===
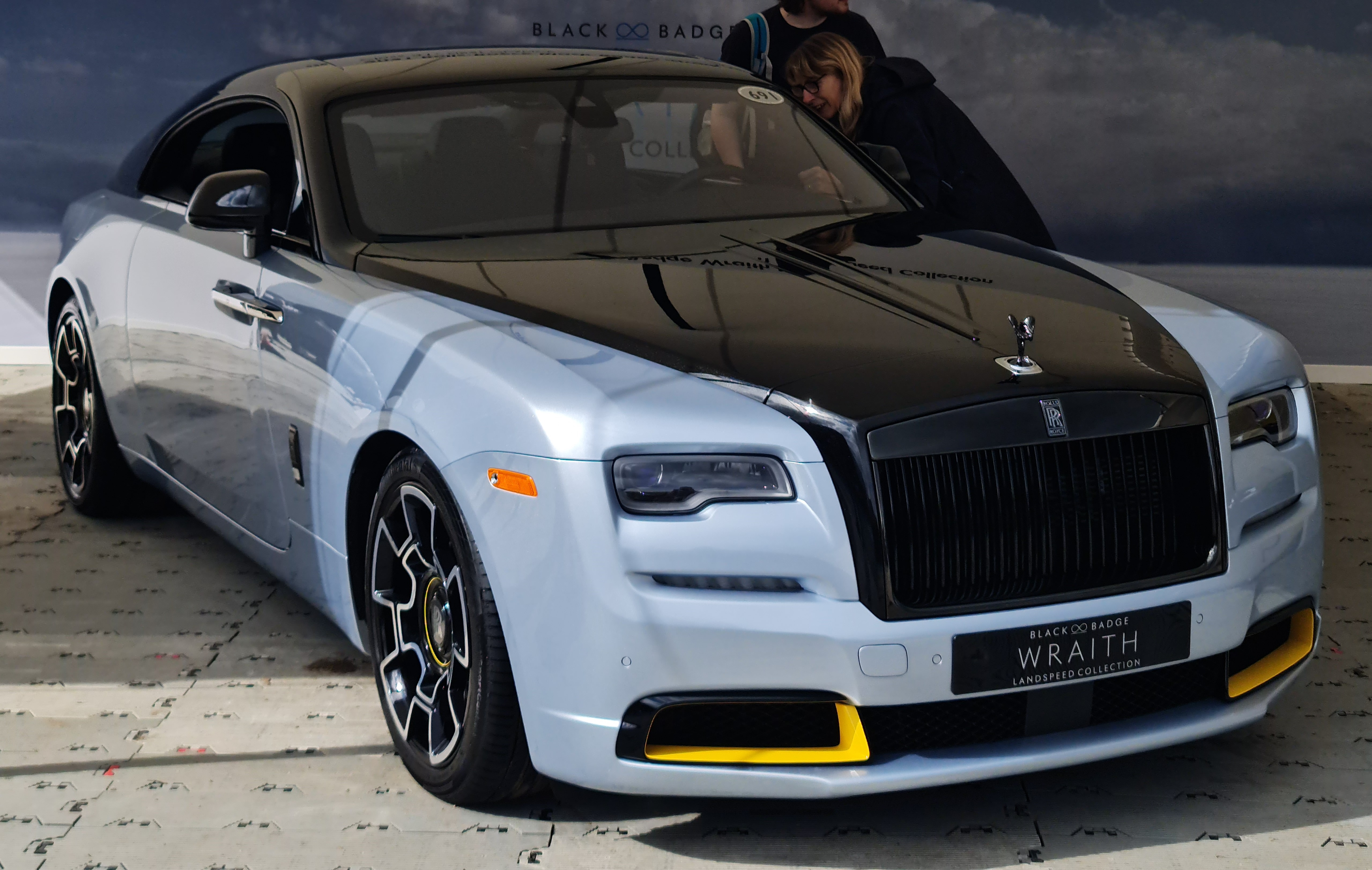
Rolls-Royce Wraith Landspeed at the Goodwood Festival of Speed

Unveiled online alongside the Rolls-Royce Dawn Landspeed in June 2021, the Landspeed Edition is a limited version of the Wraith Black Badge made to pay homage to Captain George E.T. Eyston. The interior bears new features, such as Eyston's OBE, Military Cross and Chevalier de la Légion.

Production is limited to thirty-five cars.

=== Kryptos ===
The Kryptos is a special edition of the Rolls-Royce Wraith. Deriving from ancient Greek, the name 'Kryptos' refers to all that is concealed.

Designed as a homage to the world of cryptology, this car's production is limited to 50 units.

== Special editions made by car tuners ==
=== Mansory Wraith ===
German car modification firm Mansory unveiled a modified version of the Wraith at the Geneva Motor Show in 2014. Changes to the exterior include new wheels, a modified front grille and new lower bodywork, while the interior includes new carbon fibre applications, with the traditional Mansory marble-coloured appliances also available. The engine has been tuned so that the car has the ability to accelerate from 0 to 100 km/h (62 mph) in 4.4 seconds.

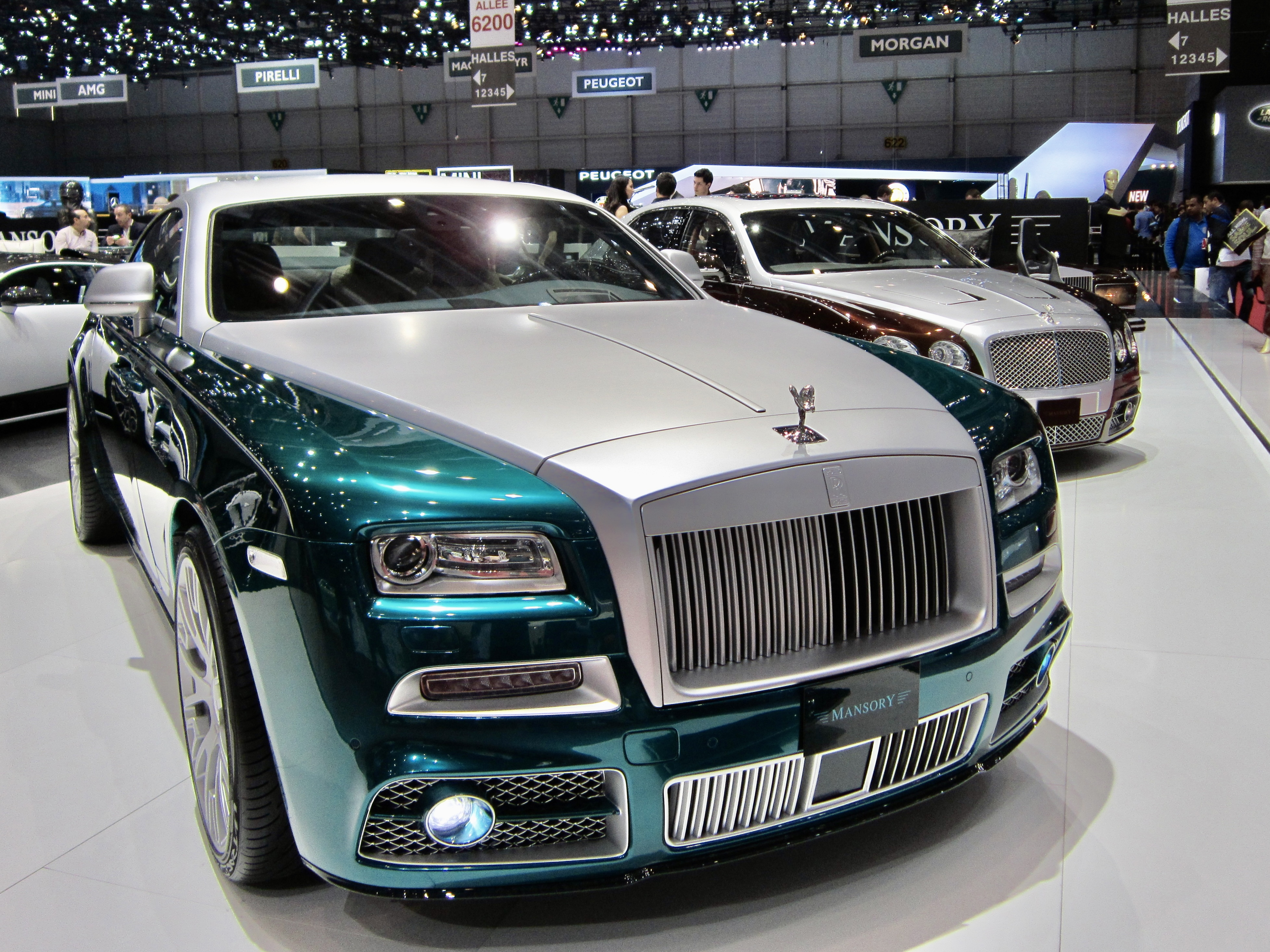
Mansory Wraith front view

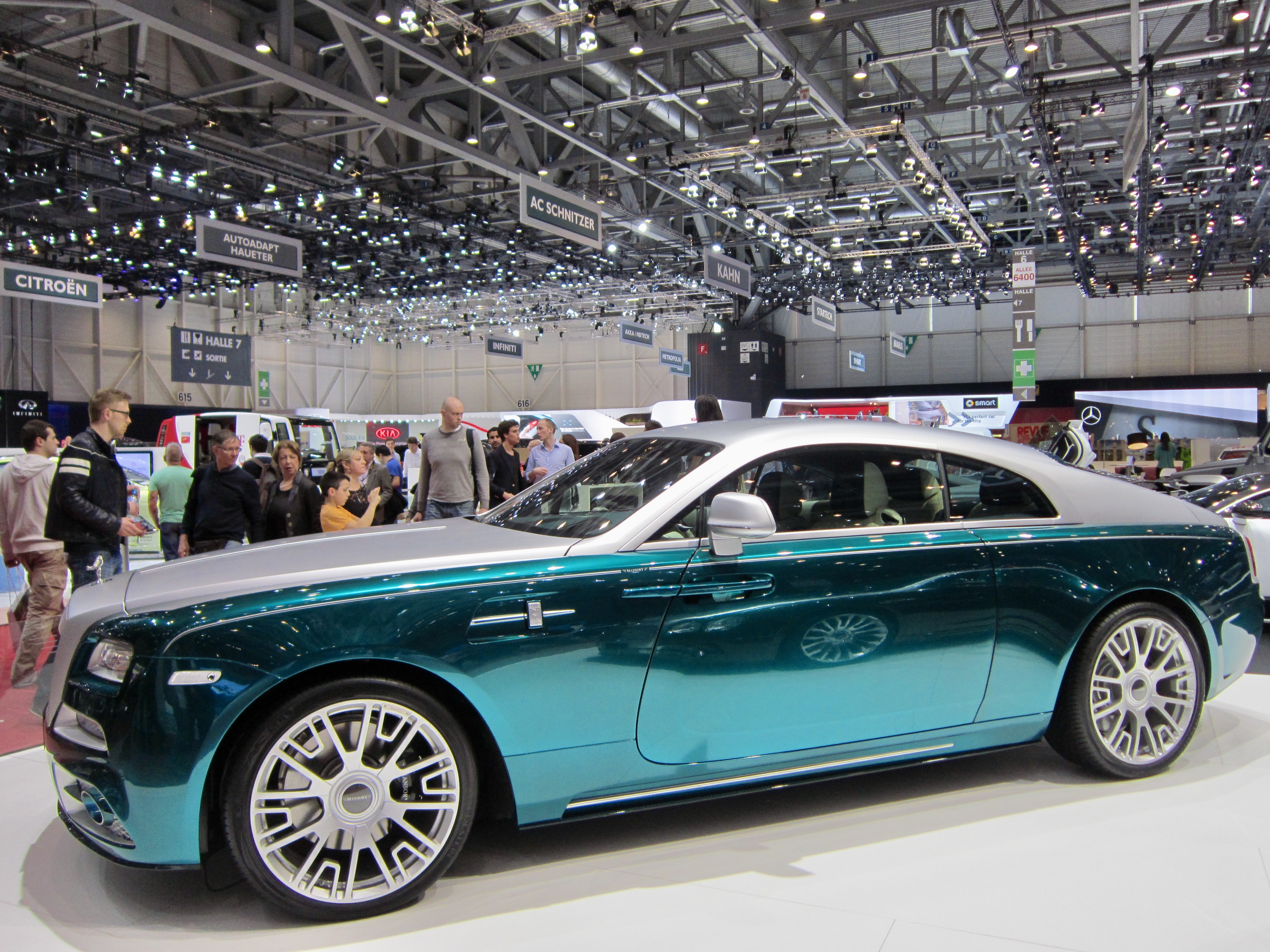
Mansory Wraith side view

==== Mansory Wraith Bleurion ====
The Mansory Wraith Bleurion is a special edition of the Mansory Wraith which has black coloured exterior features such as the front grille, comes in a blue exterior colour (including the Spirit of Ecstasy), and features blue interior details. The Bleurion features the same performance upgrades as the standard Mansory Wraith.

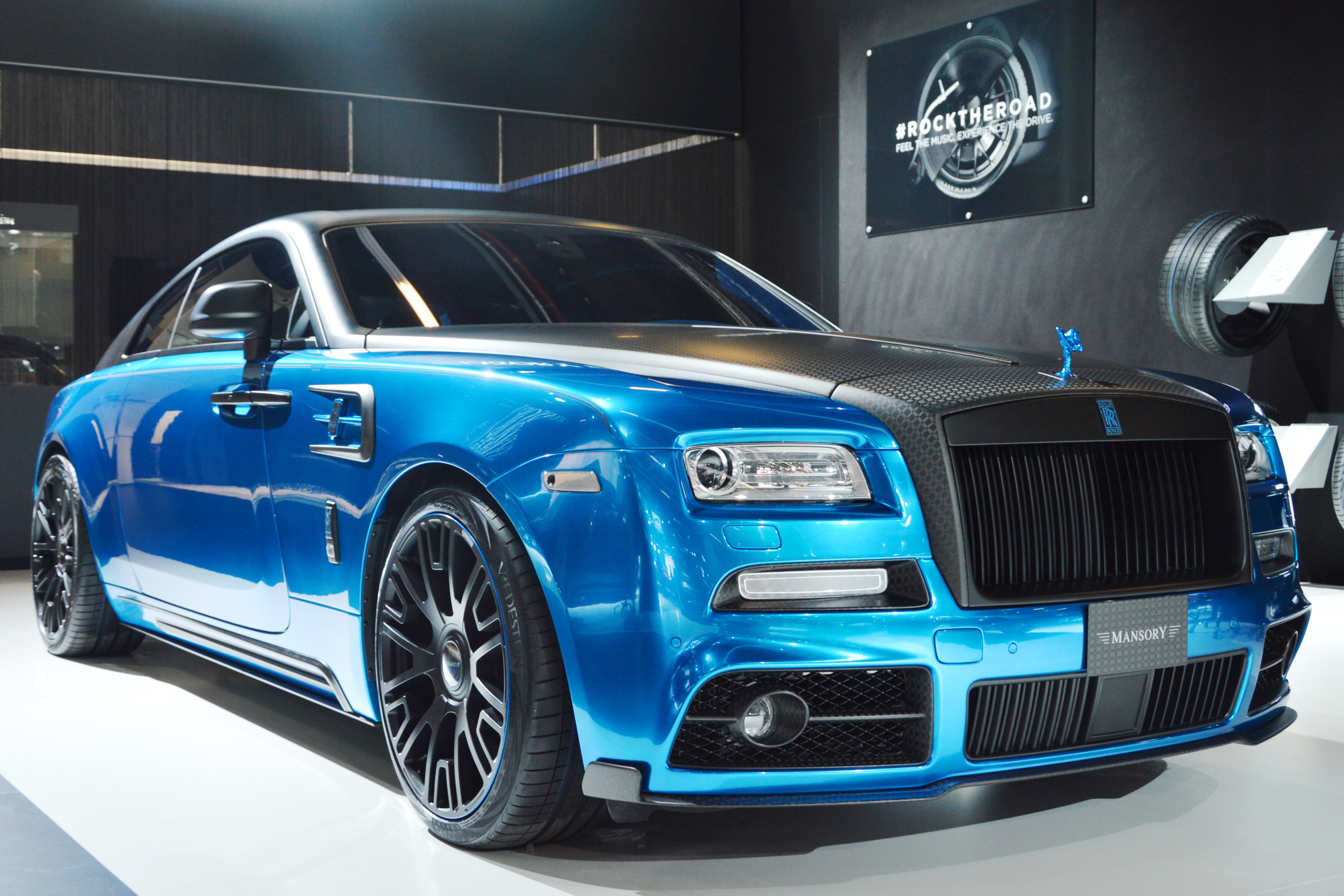
Mansory Wraith Bleurion front view

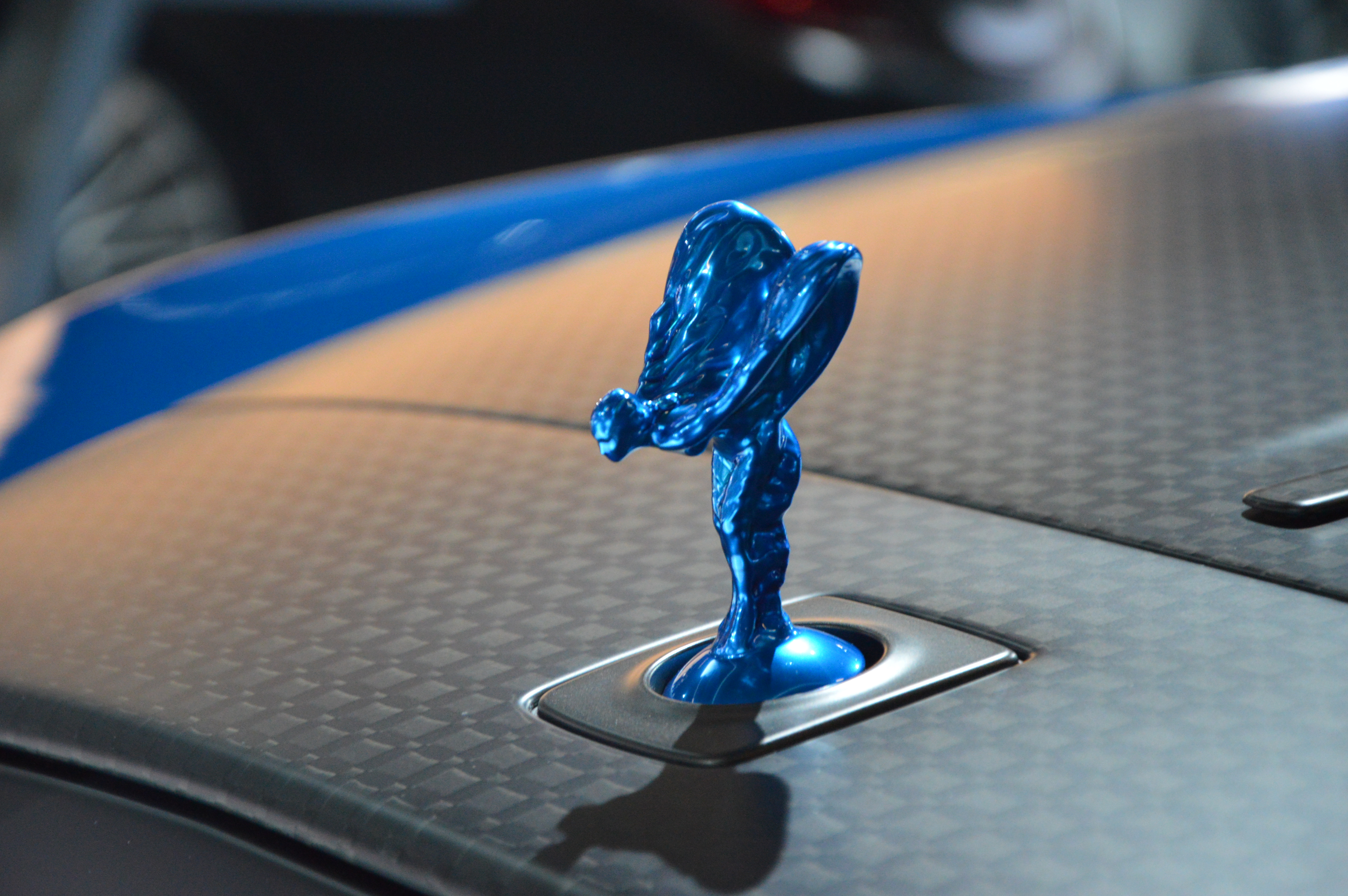
Mansory Wraith Bleurion Spirit of Ecstasy

=== Mansory Wraith 2 ===
The Mansory Wraith 2 is a modified version of the Wraith built by the German car modification firm Mansory. Its bodywork is identical to the bodywork of the Wraith Bleurion. The interior and exterior features are painted gold and the car has new wheels, as well as gold palm seats stitched on the seats which gives it the name "Palm Edition 999". The engine of the Wraith 2 has also been tuned to have the same acceleration capability of its predecessor and a top speed of 300 km/h (190 mph).

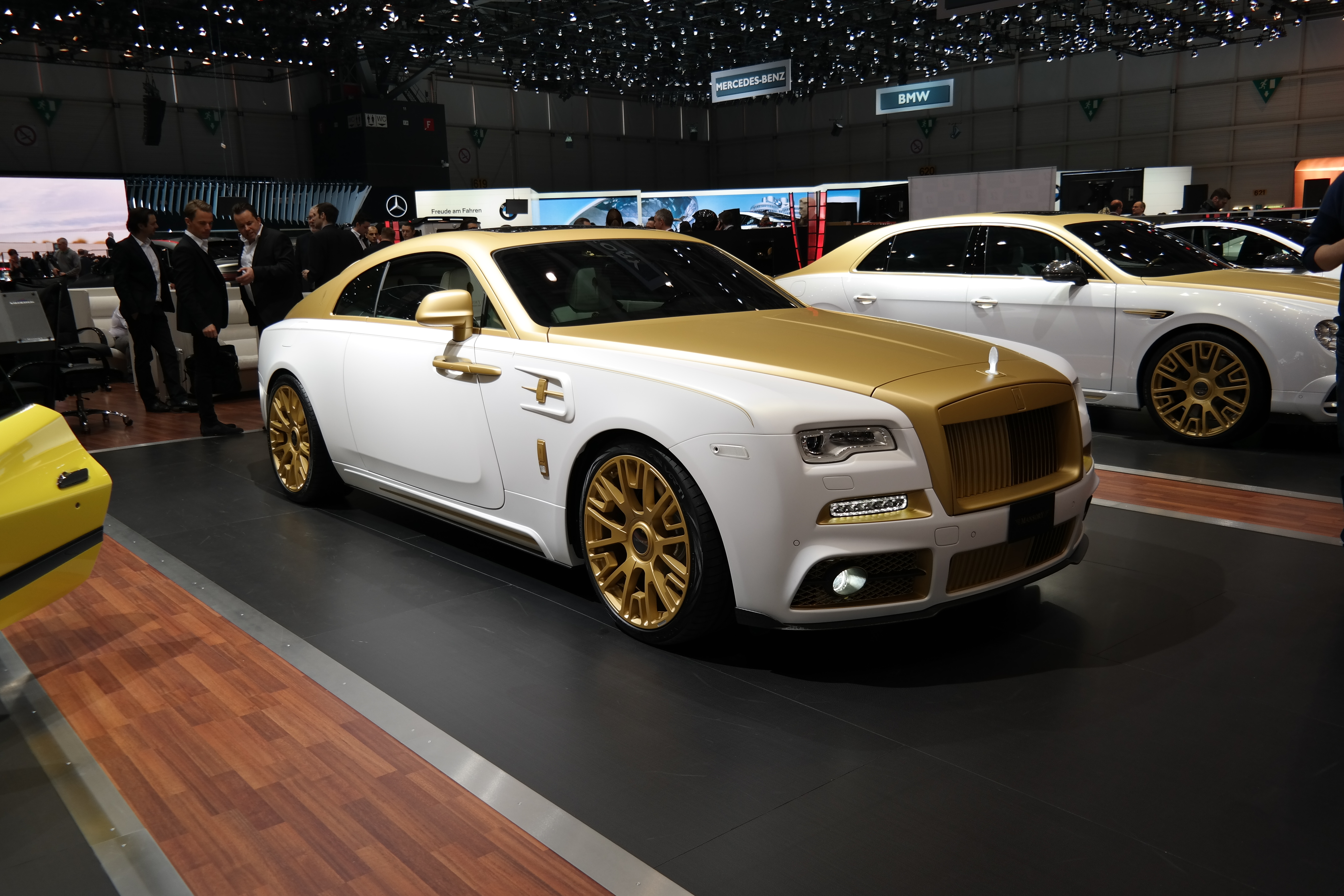
Mansory Wraith 2 front view at the Geneva Motor show, 2016

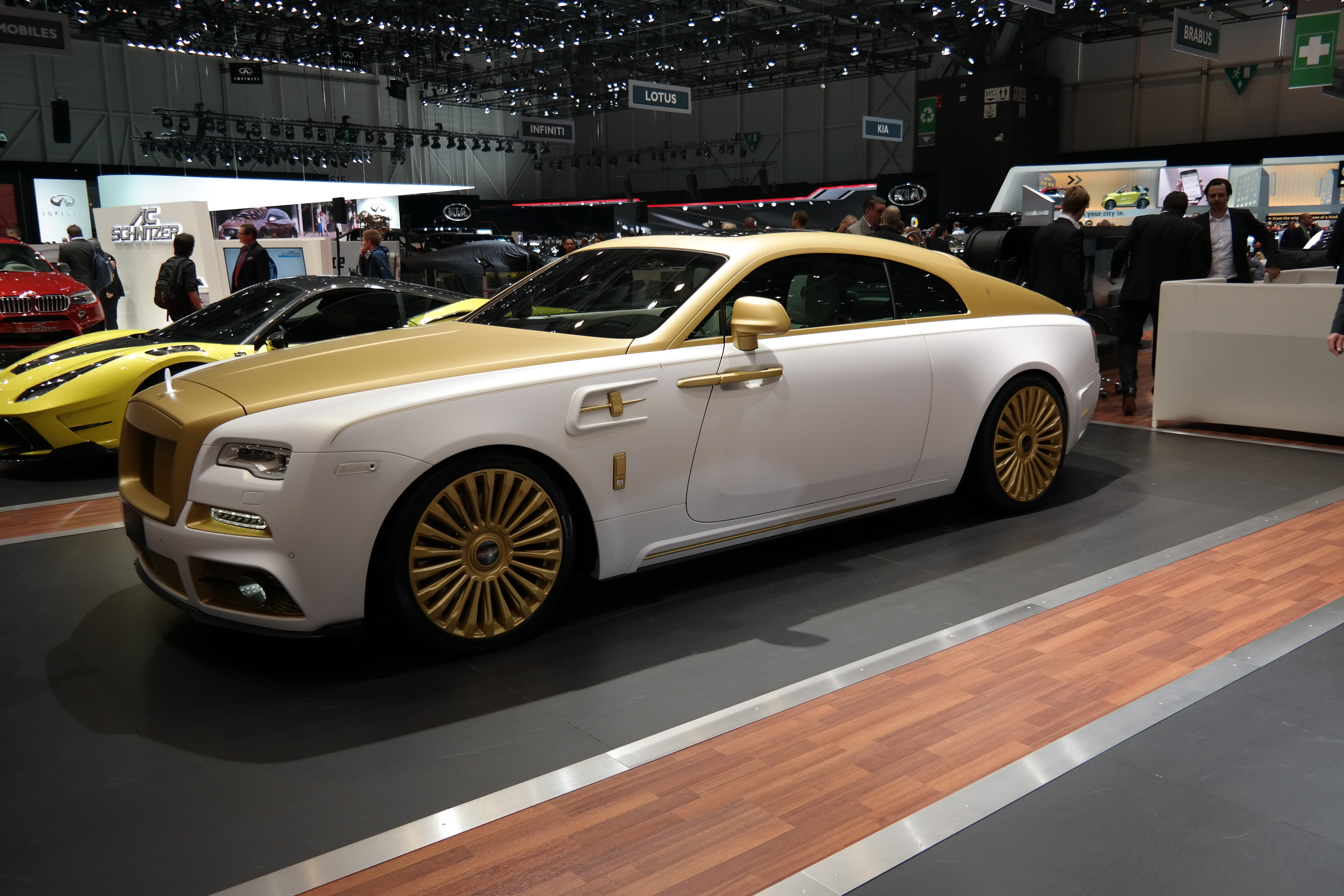
Mansory Wraith 2 side view

=== Novitec Wraith Overdose ===
The Novetic Wraith Overdose is a modified version of the Rolls-Royce Wraith built by the German car modification company, Novitec Group. It features new exterior lower bodywork and lowered suspension. The engine has been tuned to produce 717 hp (535 kW; 727 PS) and 986 N⋅m (727 lb⋅ft) of peak torque, and is fitted with a special stainless-steel sport exhaust system with electronic sound management.

The Overdose had a limited production run of eight vehicles.

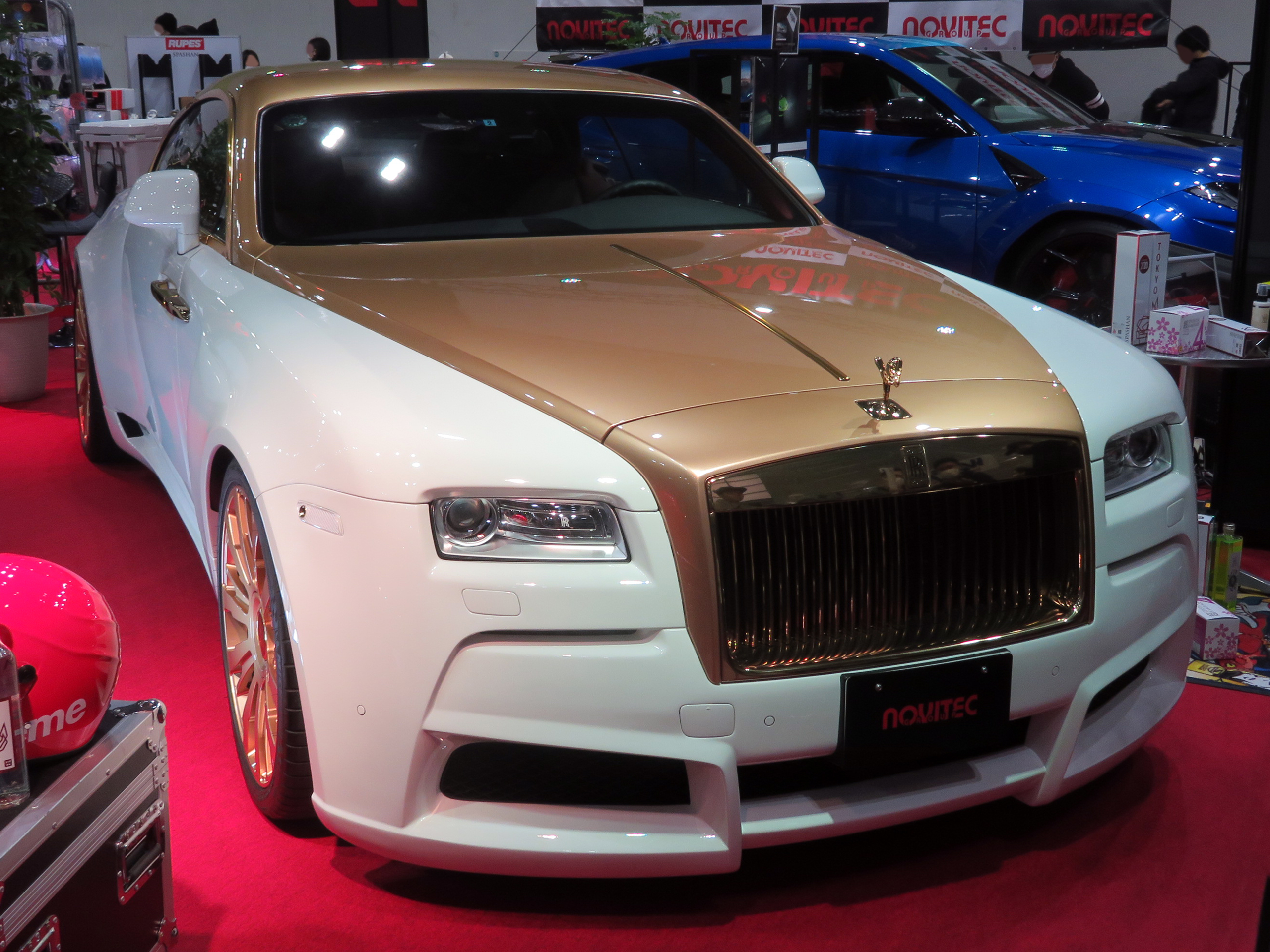
Novitec Wraith Overdose at the 2020 Osaka Auto Messe

== See also ==
- Rolls-Royce Ghost
- BMW 7 Series (F01)
