= Rolls-Royce Architecture of Luxury platform =

Overview
- Manufacturer: Rolls-Royce Motor Cars (BMW)
- Production: 2017–present

Body and chassis
- Layout: Front-engine, rear-wheel drive; Front-engine, all-wheel drive

Powertrain
- Engines: V12; 2× BMW eDrive permanently excited synchronous motors
- Transmissions: 8-speed 8HP automatic; 1-speed direct-drive

The Rolls-Royce Architecture of Luxury (A.O.L) platform is a car platform developed by Rolls-Royce Motor Cars.

It is a modular platform that utilises an aluminium spaceframe chassis. It is available with rear-wheel drive or all-wheel drive setups and debuted in the Phantom VIII in 2017. This platform would also be used by the Cullinan, second-generation Ghost, Boat Tail, and Spectre.

== Vehicles ==
- Rolls-Royce Phantom VIII (2017–present)
- Rolls-Royce Cullinan (2018–present)
- Rolls-Royce Ghost (2021–present)
- Rolls-Royce Boat Tail (2021–2022)
- Rolls-Royce Spectre (2023–present)
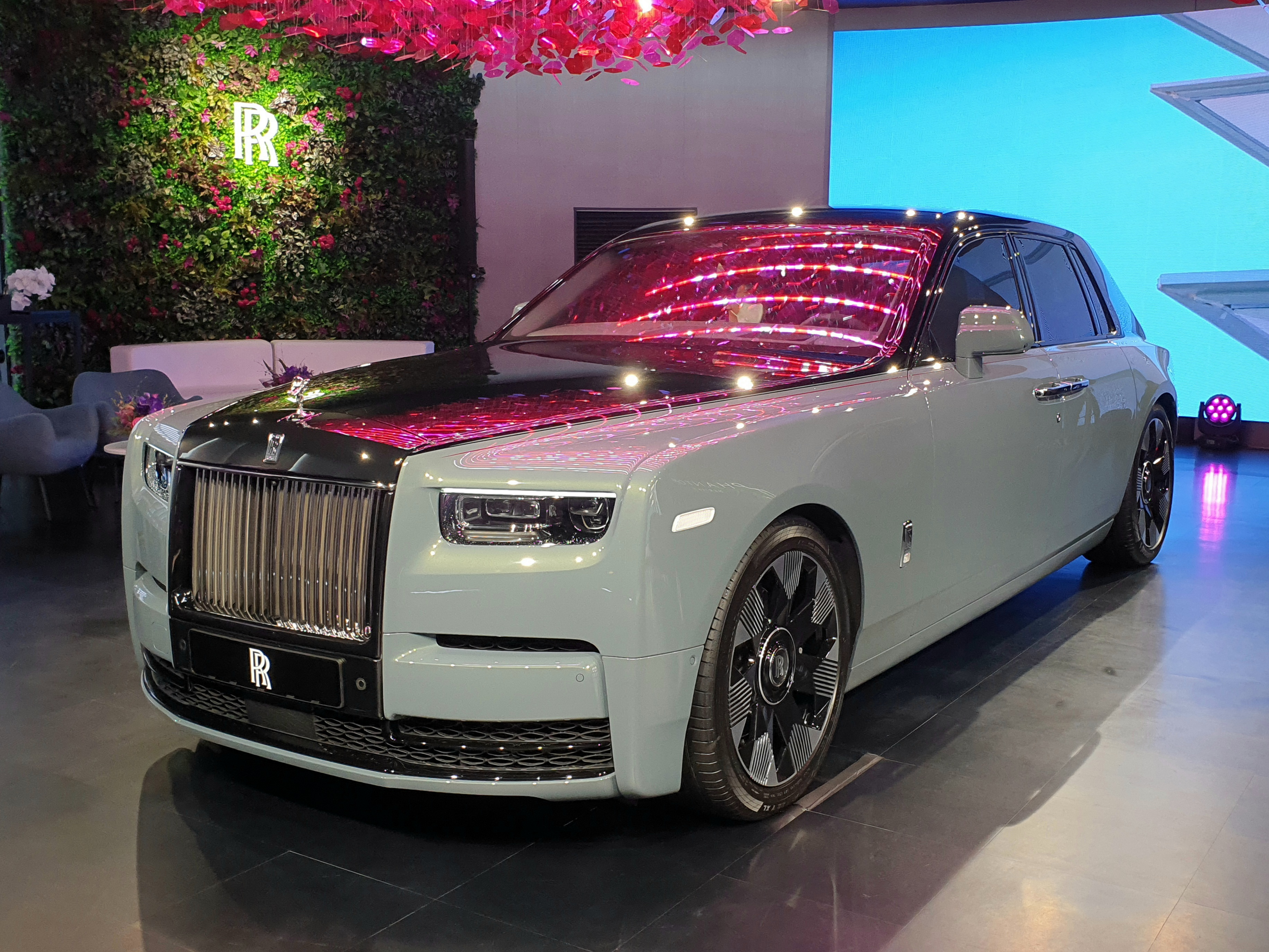
Rolls-Royce Phantom VIII

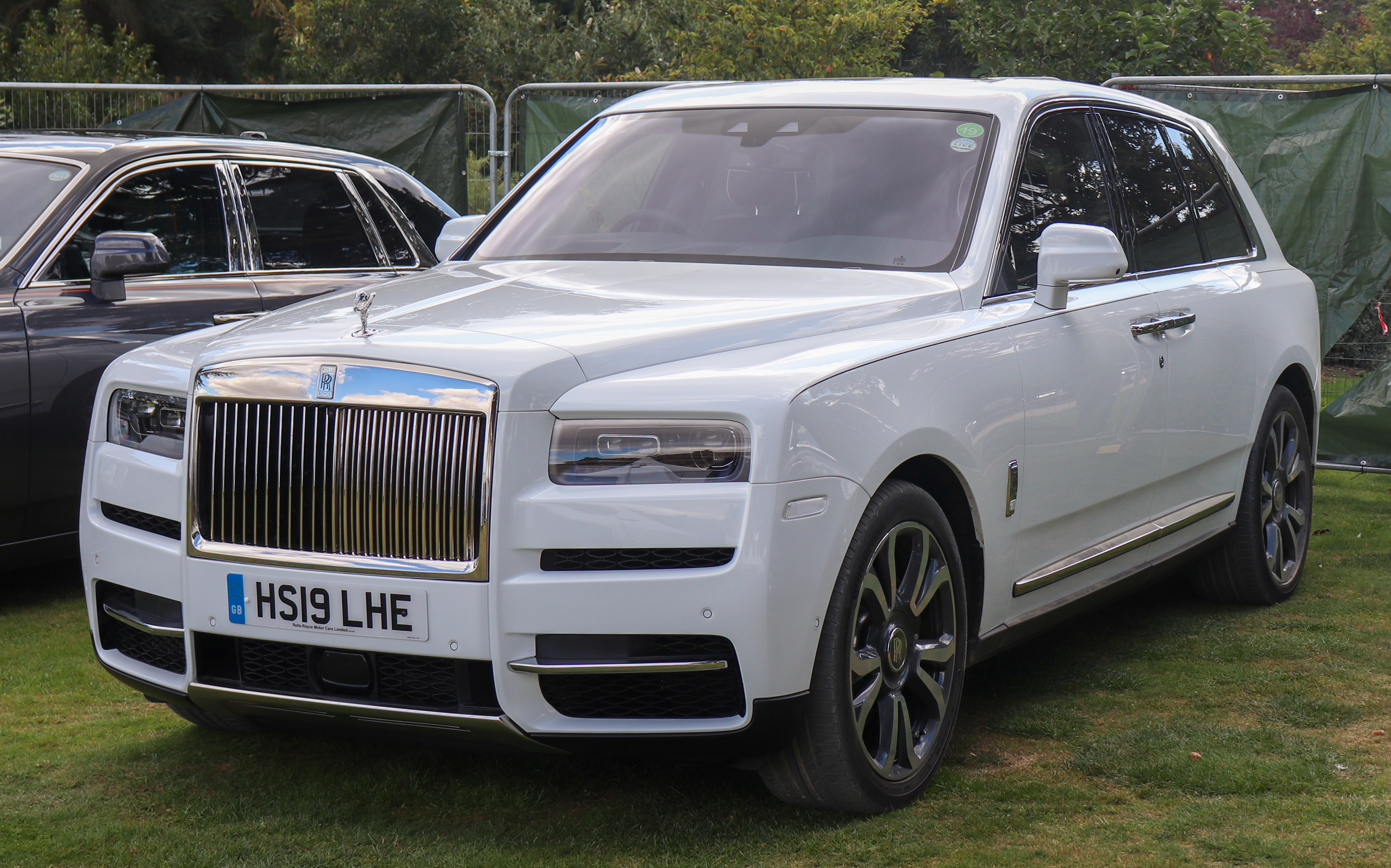
Rolls-Royce Cullinan

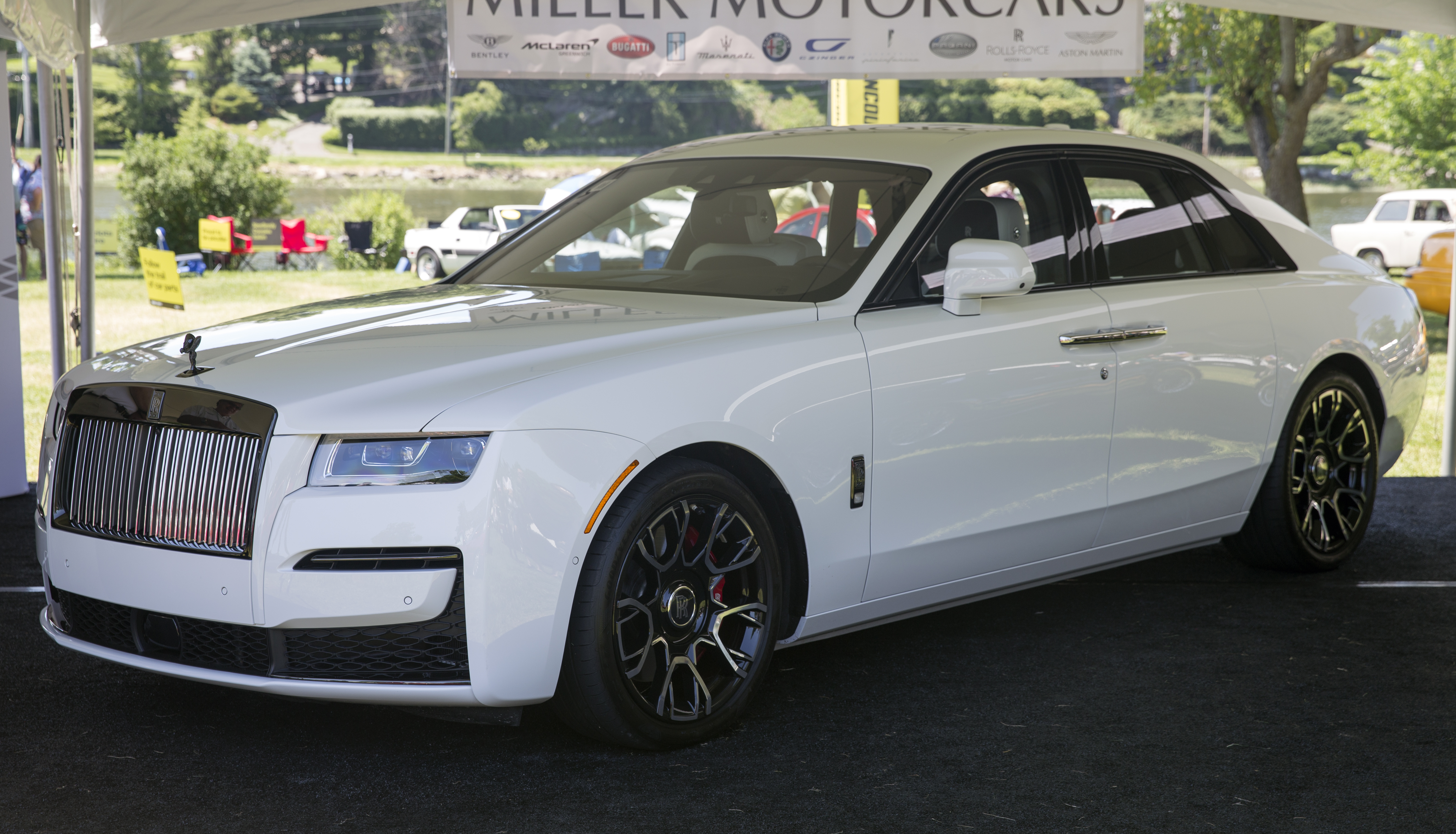
Rolls-Royce Ghost

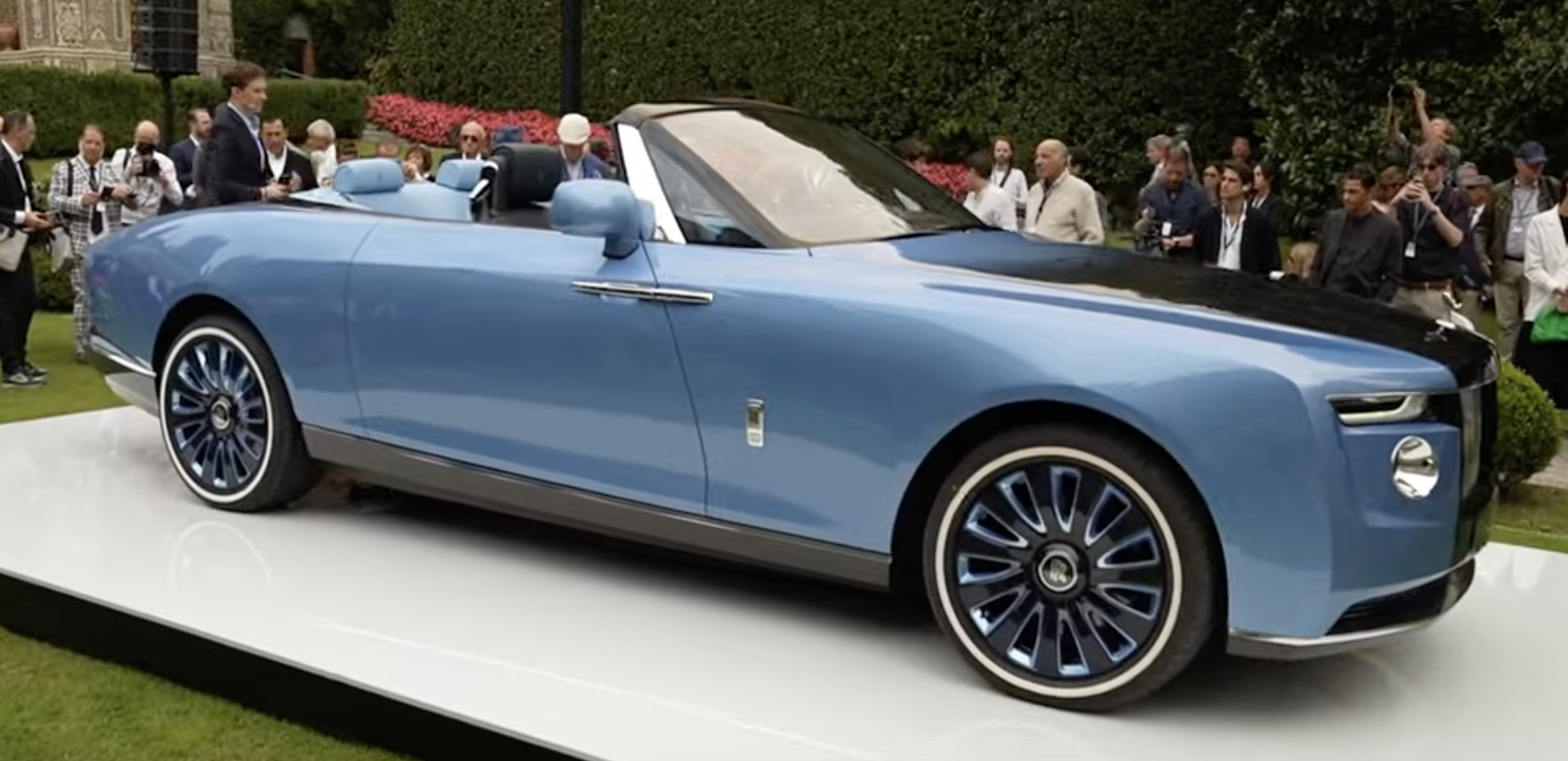
Rolls-Royce Boat Tail

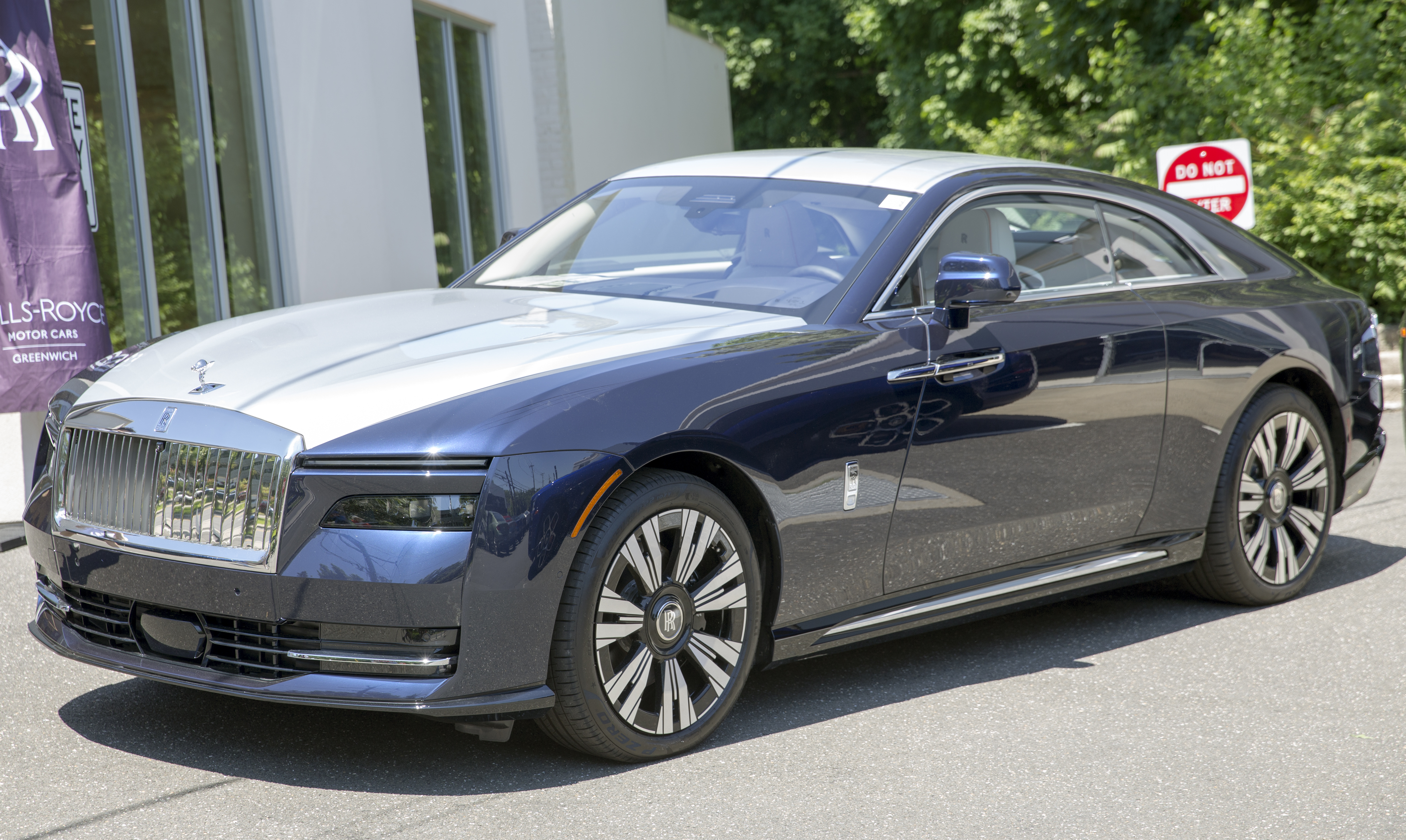
Rolls-Royce Spectre
