= Rolls-Royce Boat Tail =

2021 car model

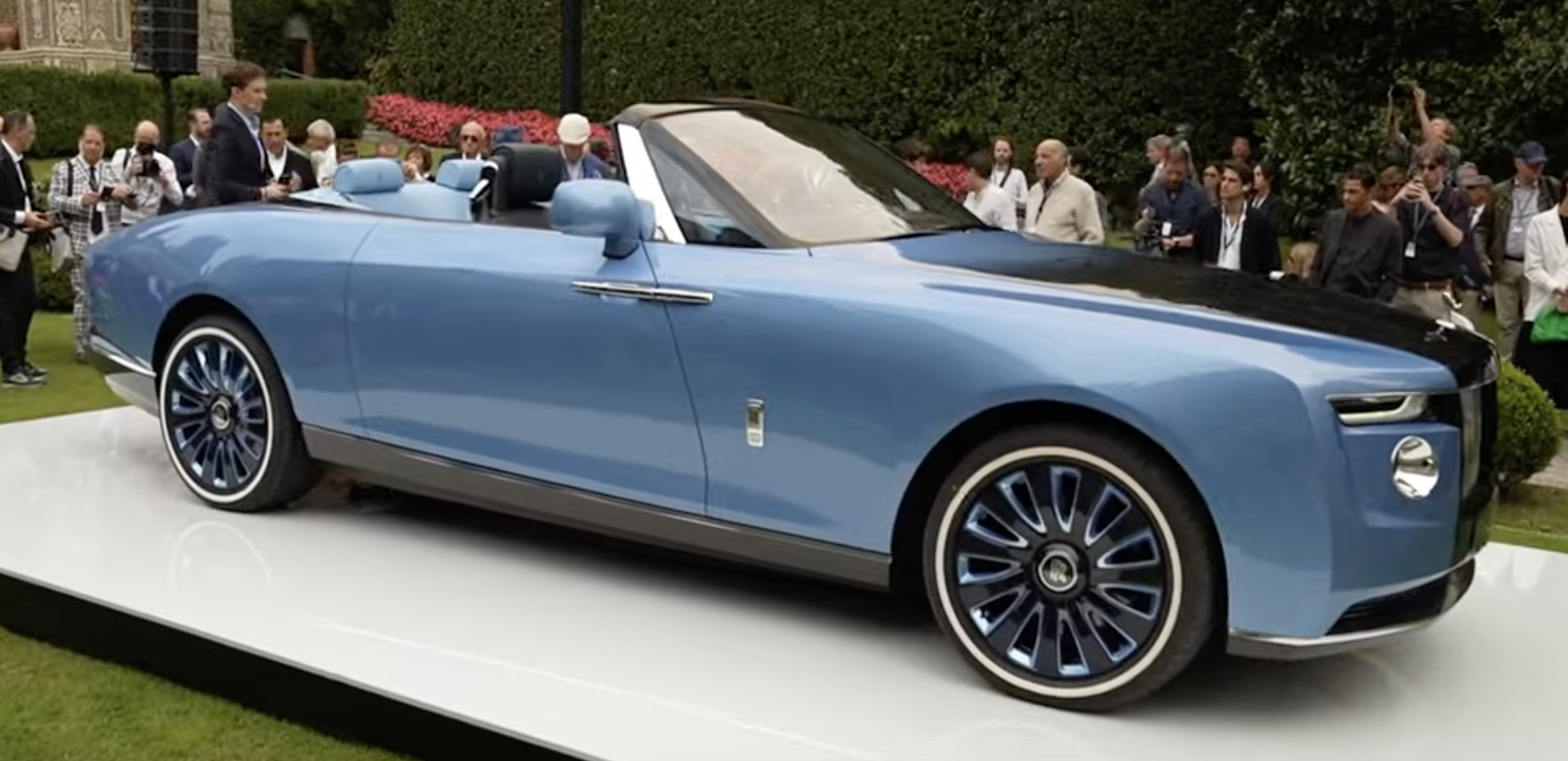

Overview
- Manufacturer: Rolls-Royce Motor Cars
- Production: 2 of 3, launch and presented on 27 May 2021
- Model years: 2021-2022
- Assembly: Goodwood Plant, West Sussex, England
- Designer: Daniel Koenigs

Body and chassis
- Class: Full-size ultra-luxury coach build
- Body style: 2-door cabriolet
- Layout: FR Layout
- Platform: Architecture of Luxury
- Doors: Suicide doors
- Related: Rolls-Royce Phantom (eighth generation)

Powertrain
- Engine: 6.75 N74B68 twin-turbocharged V12 (petrol)

Dimensions
- Wheelbase: 3,321 mm (130.7 in)
- Length: 5,760 mm (226.8 in)
- Width: 2,032 mm (80.0 in)

The Rolls-Royce Boat Tail is a mid-sized luxury coach built grand tourer car made by Rolls-Royce Motor Cars. Rolls-Royce said it created a trio of Boat Tail cars, each commissioned by a different client. It is the world's most expensive street legal new car, with a speculated price of US$28 million.

== History ==
BMW, the parent company of Rolls-Royce, trademark protected the Boat Tail Concept with the European Union Intellectual Property Office on 30 May 2018, as well as with the National Institute of Industrial Property in Brazil.

== Design ==
The car was designed by the company's specialised coachbuild division at its Goodwood plant, reinterpreting the 1910s Rolls-Royce Ltd Boat Tail car design. It draws aesthetic inspiration from yachts of the 1920s and 1930s. The car shares its chassis and engine with the Rolls-Royce Phantom; but has 1,813 bespoke parts, including five electronic control units in the rear deck. The cars feature a parasol that extends from the rear deck deployed by a mechanical system in an inverted manner like a flower, rotating cocktail tables with matching stool seats, a complete set of Christofle tableware and two fridges in a colour scheme to match Armand de Brignac champagne bottles. The deck is finished in Caleidolegno veneer and hinges towards the centre in a butterfly shape, at an angle of 67 degrees.

The first car features matching pairs of men's and women's watches manufactured by Bovet Fleurier which include a tiny sculpture of the car in the dial. The watches can be worn as a wristwatch or used as a desk clock or pocket watch, and they can also be placed in a titanium enclosure on the car's dashboard to be used as its clock. The car has a bespoke Bose Corporation sound system which uses the car's floor structure as a resonance chamber. The car includes a Montblanc pen housed in a hand-crafted case inside the glove box. The instrument panel dials feature guilloché decorative work.

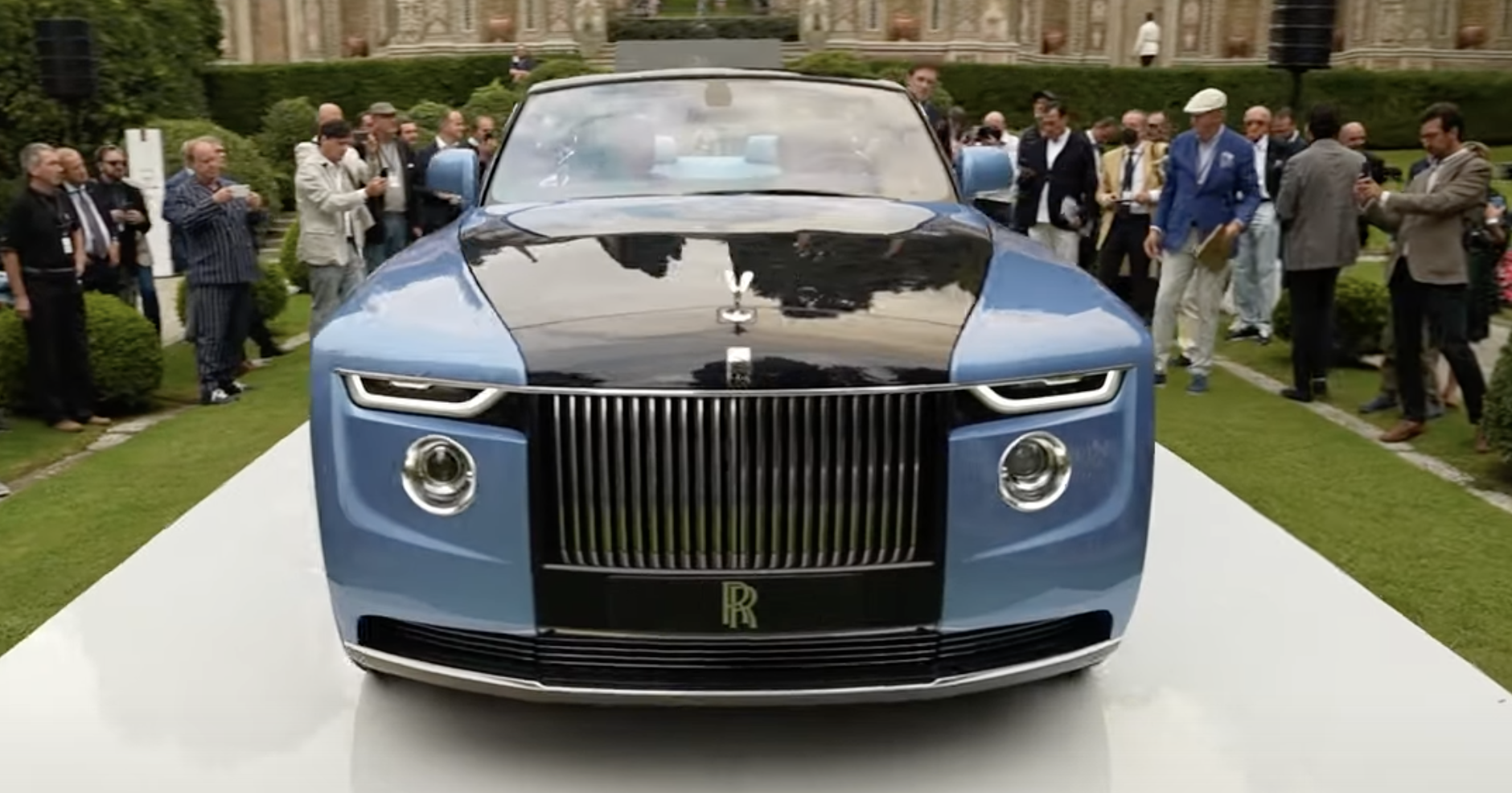

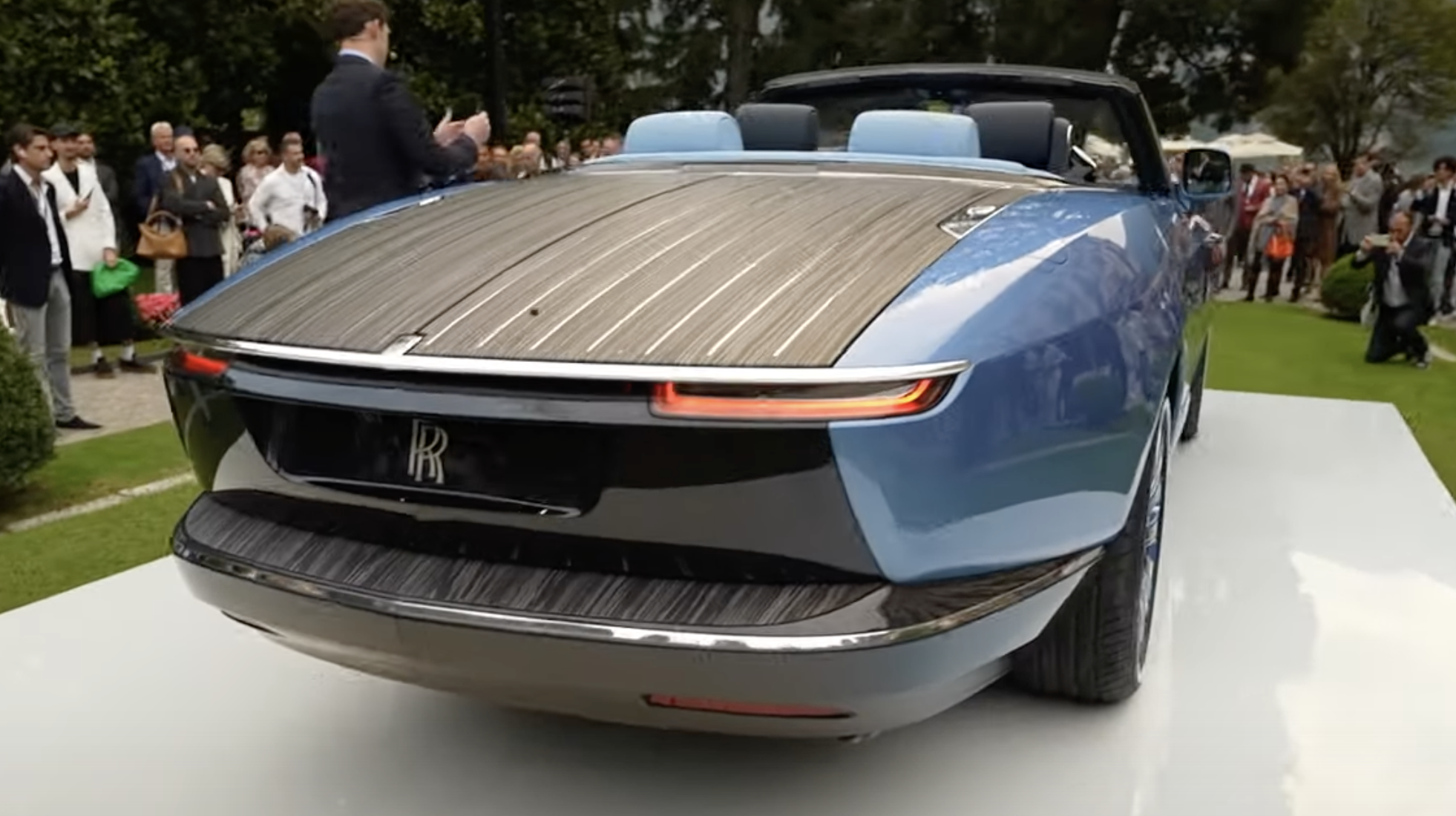

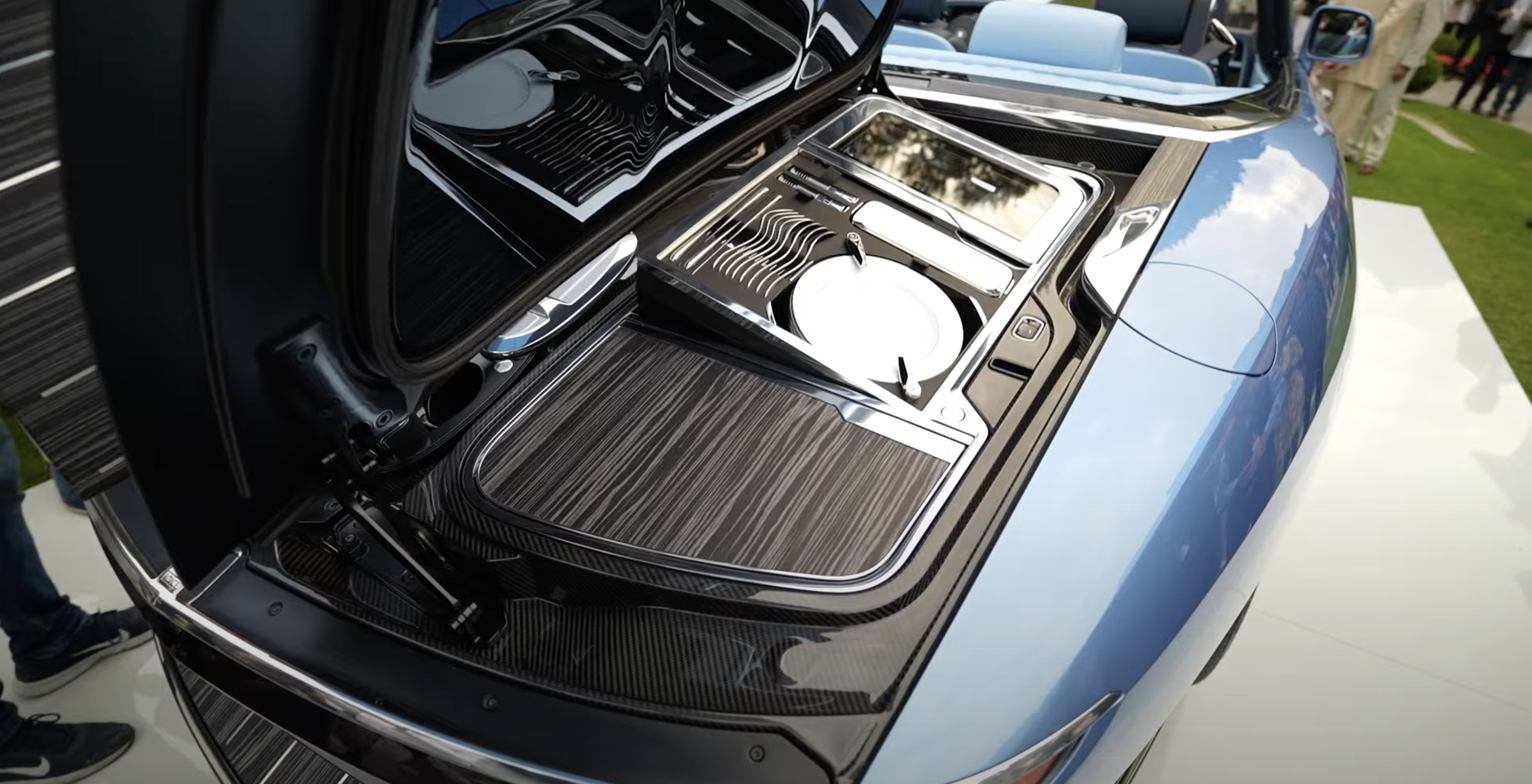
