= Official state car =

Secured vehicles used to transport heads of state or government

An official state car is an automobile used by a government to transport its head of state or head of government in an official capacity, which may also be used occasionally to transport other members of the government or visiting dignitaries from other countries. A few countries bring their own official state car for state visits to other countries, for instance, the United States, Russia, the United Kingdom, South Korea, Germany and Japan. It also may serve as an automotive symbol of the head of state and their country. An official state car must have adequate security, capability and stateliness for its duty. A limousine or other luxury vehicle is usually chosen to be an official state car.

Due to the high security risk of the passengers, these vehicles are often heavily modified with armored reinforcements, either by the manufacturer or an after-market specialist. When carrying an important passenger, the vehicle itself may be surrounded by a motorcade consisting of police or military personnel. The vehicle's driver might also be from the law enforcement or military pool.

In some cases, state cars may bear standard number plates; in other instances, special or no license plates are used.

== Sourcing ==
In countries that have domestic automobile manufacturers, the government will usually commission one of the national automakers to provide a state car, or allow several to provide cars for an official state fleet. It is considered an honour for a car manufacturer to be selected to provide a state car for their respective country and a demonstration of the confidence of a government in their national industry. For example, the president of the United States currently uses a Cadillac with special undisclosed security features commissioned by the United States government, built by General Motors. Historically the president also used Lincoln, manufactured by Ford Motor Company and also Chrysler vehicles having been used in the past, representing the Detroit Three of American manufacturers.

Soviet leaders used custom-built limousines made by the ZiL company, and though the Russian presidents switched to the Mercedes-Benz S-Class due to ZiL's decline after the dissolution of the Soviet Union, Vladimir Putin commissioned a new official state car from the national automotive establishment, which was delivered in early 2018.

In 2018, the Government of South Korea commissioned a highly modified Hyundai Nexo SUV to serve as the official state car of South Korea.

The emperor of Japan uses a Toyota Century, the prime minister of Italy uses a Maserati, the prime minister of Malaysia uses a Proton Perdana, the president of the Czech Republic is driven around in a Škoda Superb, the president of Taiwan employs a BMW 760i Protection, and the British monarch uses a Bentley.

The president of France can choose from cars manufactured by Renault or PSA Peugeot Citroën, and all major German manufacturers (Mercedes-Benz, BMW and Volkswagen Group) are represented in Germany's pool of vehicles available for use by state officials. The prime minister of India uses a Land Rover Sentinel high security edition as Jaguar and Land Rover are owned by Tata Motors, an Indian automobile company.

For countries without major indigenous manufacturers, an official state car may be purchased from a suitable manufacturer in a nation with strong economic and diplomatic ties. Canada typically aims to exclusively use state cars manufactured by the Detroit Three, many of which are made in Canadian factories, with the United States and American car manufacturers having a historically strong relationship with Canada. These companies have a well established and rich manufacturing history dating back to the 1920s in Ontario.

== Cars by state ==
This is a list of state cars and their respective users, belonging to various sovereign states and territories around the world. This list is subject to change and could be outdated in some instances, as both the individuals holding official positions and the vehicles themselves change frequently.

Details of state cars
State	Users	Cars	Motorcade or support vehicles	License plates	Image	Notes
Afghanistan	former president Ashraf Ghani	Mercedes-Benz W221	Toyota Land Cruiser J200 (2007)	None		
Albania	President Bajram Begaj	Mercedes-Benz S350	Mercedes-Benz GLS			The current Prime Minister Edi Rama was seen driving a GMC Yukon.
Abkhazia	President of Abkhazia Badra Gunba	Lexus GX460				
Algeria	President Abdelmadjid Tebboune	black armoured Mercedes-Benz S-Class 9680 4matic a BMW 7 Series and a Range Rover Vogue (for travels to the Algerian South).	Toyota Land Cruisers J200s and Hyundai Palisades			
Andorra	Josep-Lluís Serrano Pentinat (Bishop of Urgel); Emmanuel Macron (President of France); Eduard Ibáñez (the bishop's personal representative); Prime minister Xavier Espot Zamora	Audi A8	Škoda Octavia Combi police car Audi Q5 and Seat Leon			
Angola	President João Lourenço	an armored Mercedes-Benz S-Class a Toyota Land Cruiser and a Mercedes-Maybach W223 S600	Toyota Land Cruiser Prado; Toyota Land Cruiser; Mitsubishi Montero; Ford Ranger; and Toyota Hilux			
Antigua and Barbuda	Prime minister Gaston Browne	Ford Expedition	Chevrolet Tahoe and Toyota Land Cruiser Prado			
Argentina	President Javier Milei	Toyota Fortuner Peugeot RCZ, and a Mercedes-Benz E-Class (W210)(the last one was seen in Milei's presidential inauguration)	Toyota Hilux SW4, Toyota Corollas		former president Cristina Fernández de Kirchner in a Volkswagen CC going to Casa Rosada after assuming her second term in 2011.	Milei also has a small car collection consisting of cars such as:a 1961 Cadillac DeVille a 1988 Mazda MX-5 Miata and his Peugeot RCZ. while the former Argentine president Alberto Fernández had a Toyota Corolla (in which he drove himself) also an Audi A8L was used by Mauricio Macri for more details, see Presidential car (Argentina).
Armenia	President Vahagn Khachaturyan	Audi A8	Mercedes-Benz G-Class and Toyota Land Cruiser		Mercedes-Benz S-Class W221 of the former Armenian president Serzh Sargsyan during the visit of the Armenian delegation to Moscow State University in 2011.	
Artsakh	former president of Artsakh Arayik Harutyunyan	Hyundai Ioniq				
Australia	King Charles III	During King Charles III's 2024 official visit to Australia, the king and queen were driven in an Audi SQ8 e-tron.		Tudor Crown instead of number plates		Flies the King's Personal Australian Flag.
Australia	Governor-General Sam Mostyn	Rolls-Royce Phantom VI (ceremonial occasions) white armoured BMW 7 series (official business)		Tudor Crown instead of number plates	The Rolls-Royce Phantom VI used as the ceremonial state car in 2015	The official cars of the governor-general fly the flag of the governor-general. A similar arrangement is used for state governors.
Australia	Prime Minister Anthony Albanese	white armoured BMW 7 Series	armoured BMW X5	number plate C1 (meaning "Commonwealth One")	The Australian prime minister's BMW 7 Series, January 2017	Prior to 2013, vehicles in the prime ministerial fleet were white armored Holden Caprice and Ford Territory. For more details, see Prime Ministerial Limousine (Australia).
Austria	President Alexander Van der Bellen	armored BMW 7 Series xdrive	BMW X5; Audi Q7; Audi A8; Mercedes-Benz S-Class		BMW 7 Series of the Austrian president in 2021.	Senior government figures in Austria drive in the Audi A8, BMW 7 Series and Mercedes-Benz S-Class
Azerbaijan	President Ilham Aliyev	armored Maybach 62; heavy armored custom-built Mercedes-Benz W222 S600 Guard Pullman; and a Togg T10X.			Mercedes-Benz S-Class of the Azerbaijani president in 2015.	
Bahamas	Prime Minister Philip Davis	BMW I7 and a Lexus LS460L.	Toyota Land Cruiser J200; Ford Explorer; Chevrolet Tahoe			Davis's previous vehicle was a Mercedes W221 S500.
Bahrain	King Hamad bin Isa Al Khalifa	red extended Mercedes-Benz S-Class (W221); a Mercedes-Benz 600 Landaulette (ceremonial car) and a Land Rover Range Rover (for tours inside Bahrain	Toyota Land Cruiser; BMW 7 Series; Nissan Patrol			
Bangladesh	Prime minister of Bangladesh Tarique Rahman	BMW 7 Series and a Mercedes-Maybach W222	Toyota Land Cruiser; Lexus LX570; Nissan Patrol(Y62); Mercedes-Benz Sprinter Ambulance			The former prime minister of Bangladesh Sheikh Hasina traveled in an armoured BMW 7 Series, as well as an armoured Mercedes-Benz G-Class and a Mercedes-Maybach W222.
Barbados	President Jeffrey Bostic	White Mercedes-Benz S-Class W222	Police motorcycles; Toyota Land Cruiser; Toyota Land Cruiser Prado			
Barbados	Prime Minister Mia Mottley	Gray Mercedes-Benz S-Class W222				
Belarus	President of Belarus Alexander Lukashenko	armored Mercedes-Maybach W222 S600 Pullman	Police cars Lexus LX570			
Belgium	King Philippe	Mercedes-Benz S-Class or a BMW 7 Series and a Range Rover Vogue		number plate '1' (Note: All royal family members drive cars with only numbers on the licence plate.)	King Philippe in a BMW 7 Series in 2012	For his inauguration, a Mercedes-Benz 600 landaulette was used. King Baudouin and Queen Fabiola used a 1955 Cadillac Series 62 Convertible, with a bulletproof bubble-top.
Belgium	Prime Minister Bart De Wever	Audi A6				Federal government officials: number plates starting with an "A" followed by 1–3 numbers. Regional government officials: number plates starting with an "E" followed by 1–3 numbers. Members of parliament and the senate: number plates starting with a "P" followed by 3 numbers.
Belgium	Queen Paola of Belgium	Fiat 500 (personal car)		diplomatic plates		
Belize	Governor-General Froyla Tzalam and prime minister Johnny Briceño	convertible Genesis EQ900				Ministers generally use the Toyota Prado or the Ford Excursion
Benin	president of Benin Patrice Talon	armored Mercedes-Benz W222 S600				
Bhutan	King Jigme Khesar Namgyel Wangchuck	Lexus LX570	Jeep Wrangler; Toyota Hilux			The former King, Jigme Singye Wangchuck, drove a Toyota Land Cruiser. while Ministers and senior government officials are assigned Toyota Land Cruiser Prado for official use.
Bosnia and Herzegovina	Members of the presidency	Audi A8	Volkswagen Passat			
Bosnia and Herzegovina	Other government officials	Volkswagen Passat or the Škoda Superb				
Bolivia	President Rodrigo Paz	armoured Lexus LS 460L	four Toyota Land Cruisers			
Botswana	President Duma Boko	Lexus LX and a Mercedes-Benz W222 S600	Toyota Land Cruiser J300 and J200; BMW 7 Series (G70); Toyota Hilux; Land Rover Defender			
Brazil	President of Brazil Luiz Inácio Lula da Silva	1952 Rolls-Royce Silver Wraith (exclusively for Independence Day, state visits and the presidential inauguration); 2024-model armored BYD Tang (used as official state car)		The federal government's most important officials use yellow-green brass plates with the coat of arms of Brazil and their titles.	Dilma Rousseff riding in the ceremonial state car, the Rolls-Royce Silver Wraith during the Independence Day parade in 2012. BYD Tang model 2024	A Ford Fusion was used until 2023 and before that in June 2008. In February 2012 the Brazilian government bought 12 Canadian-built Ford Edge models for the use of President Dilma Rousseff and her security team. Other cars such as the Mitsubishi Outlander are also used. For more details, see Presidential State Car (Brazil).
Brunei	Sultan of Brunei Hassanal Bolkiah	1992 state landaulette Rolls-Royce Phantom VI (ceremonial) black Mercedes-Benz M-Class W163 ML55 AMG, black Brabus G700, and a Maybach 62 (personal cars)	BMW E39 540i; BMW E61 545i; Lexus LX470		Rolls-royce Phantom VI used by the Sultan of Brunei in July 2022	The Sultan of Brunei also uses other cars as personal vehicles while he and his brother the Prince Jefri Bolkiah own several luxury and exotic cars.
Brunei	Queen Saleha of Brunei	2012 Rolls Royce Phantom Series II	Volvo S80 V8 or the Mitsubishi 380			
Brunei	Cabinet ministers and visiting foreign dignitaries	black Mercedes-Benz W221 S350L				
Brunei	Other senior ranking officials	black Mercedes-Benz W211 E280				
Bulgaria	President of Bulgaria Iliana Iotova	Mercedes-Benz S600 Guard; BMW 5 Series; BMW 7 Series	Ford; Toyota; Audi A6 and Audi A8			
Bulgaria	Prime minister Andrey Gyurov	Toyota Land Cruiser, and a black BMW X5	Fords; Toyotas; Audi A6 and Audi A8			
Burkina Faso	Interim President and MPSR President Ibrahim Traoré	Lexus LX570	Toyota Land Cruiser J70			
Burundi	President of Burundi Évariste Ndayishimiye	armored Toyota Land Cruiser 200, sometimes armored Toyota Land Cruiser 300	Toyota Land Cruiser 200 and 300, and Toyota Hilux			
Cambodia	King Norodom Sihamoni	black Mercedes S680 stretch( upgrade in 2026 ) (daily use); armoured Range Rover Sentinel stretch (provincial/rural travel); and a black convertible Mercedes-Benz W126 (ceremonial use)		Royal Palace plate number		
Cameroon	President Paul Biya	armoured Range Rover Sentinel	Toyota Land Cruisers			
Cape Verde	president of Cape Verde José Maria Neves	Mercedes-Benz C-Class (W205) and a BMW 7 Series (F01)	Toyota Land Cruiser Prado			
Canada	King Charles III	During King Charles III's 2025 visit to Canada, the king and queen were driven in a BMW 7 Series				Flies the Royal Standard of Canada
Canada	Governor General Mary Simon	Lincoln Town Car (historic); Lincoln Continental (current)		old St. Edward's Crown on a red field (monarch) standard licence plate of the province of Ontario (governor-general)	The motorcade of Queen Elizabeth II in Winnipeg in 2010. The queen's car, second in line, is a Lincoln Town Car bearing her Canadian royal standard.	Bears the flag of office affixed to the right front fender. For more details, see Royal and viceroyal transport in Canada.
Canada	Prime Minister Mark Carney	an armored Chevrolet Suburban or a long-wheelbase armoured Cadillac DTS	motorcade of typically ten cars and four motorcycles, led by a Chrysler 300	standard Ontario licence plate		Historically, prime ministers were usually driven in Cadillac limousines.
Central African Republic	president of Central African Republic Faustin-Archange Touadéra	armored Toyota Land Cruiser J200	Toyota Land Cruiser J200			
Chad	president of Chad Mahamat Déby	Mercedes-Benz S-Class W222	Toyota Land Cruiser J70			
Chile	President of Chile Gabriel Boric	horse drawn "Bandeja" Carriage or 1966 Ford Galaxie XL (ceremonial) and an armored Chevrolet Tahoe Z71 (daily transportation)	Hyundai Santa Fe and Hyundai Sonata		The Ford Galaxie has been Chile's ceremonial presidential car since 1970.	For more details see Presidential car (Chile)
China	General Secretary of the Chinese Communist Party Xi Jinping	• armored Hongqi N701 limousine.		VA-02282	Hongqi L5 used by Xi Jinping as his official state car its also used to transport foreign dignitaries	Before the production of Hongqi began, Chinese leaders used various foreign luxury cars. When visiting a foreign country, Chinese leaders generally use vehicles supplied by the host country. This custom began to change in November 2014, when Xi Jinping, General Secretary of the Communist Party, and current paramount leader used his own Hongqi L5 limousine on a state visit to New Zealand.
Colombia	President Gustavo Petro	four Israeli-made armored BMW 7 Series and several units of Toyota Land Cruiser Sahara	three BMWs and eight Toyota Saharas, all armored, plus a Prado armored level IIIA used by the National Intelligence Directorate, an ambulance and no less than eight motorcycles	presidential tags	The presidential motorcade for the president of Colombia includes armoured BMW 7 series, and several Toyota Land Cruisers.	
Comoros	president of Comoros Azali Assoumani	armored Range Rover Vogue	Toyota Land Cruiser J200			
Costa Rica	President Rodrigo Chaves Robles	two Toyota Land Cruisers				Before, a Hyundai Equus limo, donated by the government of South Korea, was used as the Presidential State Car.
Croatia	President Zoran Milanović	armored black BMW 7 Series occasionally a Volkswagen Passat or a Mercedes-Benz E250.	marked and unmarked BMW and Audi models			These vehicles are part of the vehicle fleet of the Honor Guard Battalion.
Croatia	prime minister of Croatia Andrej Plenković and speaker of the Croatian Parliament	armored Black BMW 7 Series				
Croatia	government ministers	BMW 5 Series and the Audi A6.				These vehicles are part of the vehicle fleet of Ministry of the Interior's Department of Protection of Protected Persons.
Cuba	president of Cuba and First Secretary Miguel Díaz-Canel	Mercedes-Benz S-Class W220				
Cuba	Fidel Castro	Soviet-made ZiL limousines and a GAZ-69				
Cyprus	President of Cyprus Nikos Christodoulides	Mercedes-Benz W221 S600	police bikes and Mercedes-Benz GLE W164	Coat of Arms of Cyprus		
Czech Republic	President Petr Pavel	Škoda Superb in top-end 'Laurin & Klement' trim			Škoda Superb	Historically, presidents of Czechoslovakia were driven in cars manufactured by Škoda (Hispano-Suiza and VOS), Praga (Grand and Golden), Tatra (80, 603 and 613), Daimler (EL24 and DE36), ZiL (110, 111, 114 and 115) and GAZ (12-ZIM and M13-Čajka). After 1989, Czech presidents used Renault 21, BMW 735i and 750i, Mercedes-Benz 600 SEL, Audi A8 4.2 and thereafter Škoda Superb.
Democratic Republic of the Congo	President Felix Tshisekedi	Mercedes-Maybach S600	Toyota Land Cruisers 70s			
Denmark	King Frederik X	1958 Rolls-Royce Silver Wraith seven-seater limousine (LGLW 25 body no. 10181), commonly referred to as "Store Krone" (Great Crown); Daimler DS420 eight-seater limousines and a Tesla Model S		Krone with a number	"Store Krone" in 2018, followed by two Daimler DS420 limousines from the Danish royal fleet	Recently the Danish royal fleet also acquired seven eco-friendly cars including the Volkswagen ID.3 referred as "Crown 18" (used as the King's personal vehicle and also "for practical tasks between Amalienborg and Fredenborg Palace") and two Audi A8 L 60 TFSI e quattro hybrid variants with the plates Crown 9 and 10 that are both used to transport members of the royal household.
Denmark	Prime minister Mette Frederiksen	Audi A8 L				The ministers in the Danish government have different cars, including the VW Phaeton, BMW 5 Series, BMW 7 Series, Audi A6, Audi A8 and Mercedes-Benz S-Class.
Faroe Islands	Faroese Prime Minister Aksel V. Johannesen	BMW X5				
Greenland	Prime Minister of Greenland Jens-Frederik Nielsen	Mercedes-Benz V-Class	Mitsubishi Outlander			
Djibouti	president of Djibouti Ismaïl Omar Guelleh	Mercedes-Benz W221	Toyota Land Cruiser J200			
Dominica	president of Dominica Sylvanie Burton	Toyota Land Cruiser Prado	Toyota Fortuner			
Dominican Republic	President of the Dominican Republic Luis Abinader	Black Lincoln Navigator (daily use) and a Black Tesla Model S (used in ceremonial activities)	Black Toyota 4Runner, Toyota Land Cruiser Prado, Chevrolet Tahoe, Ford Explorer, Ford Expedition, Toyota Landcruiser, and Toyota Sequoia.	0–1 plate (Presidential Plate)		Previous presidents used the Toyota Landcruiser and Lexus LX570 as official state cars
Dominican Republic	Provincial governors	Mitsubishi L200		Plate with the official government design, numeration varies		Previous vehicles are still use as were the Mitsubishi Montero. They could also use their own personal vehicles.
Ecuador	President Daniel Noboa	armored Lincoln Town Car and an armored Chevrolet Trooper				In 2023 former president Guillermo Lasso was seen using a Kia Carnival Surrounded by its Security Guards and escorted by a Kia police Car and a Ford Explorer.
Egypt	President Abdel Fattah el-Sisi	black armored variant of the 2013 Mercedes-Benz S-Class		black number plate with the presidential crest above an Arabic 1		Previously a black armored 1998 Mercedes-Benz S-Class was used by former leader Hosni Mubarak until February 2011. An earlier model of it helped save his life in Ethiopia in 1995.
Egypt	High-ranking officials	black BMW 7 Series, or Audi A8s		special government number plates		Parliamentary vehicles are often Mercedes-Benz E-Class.
Equatorial Guinea	president of Equatorial Guinea Teodoro Obiang Nguema Mbasogo	Mercedes-Benz W222 S600				The president's son and current vice president Teodoro Nguema Obiang Mangue had a collection of supercars that include:a Lamborghini Veneno a Koenigsegg Agera a McLaren P1 and a Bugatti Veyron and he also had a Rolls Royce Cullinan for daily use his collection was seized from him and was eventually auctioned in Switzerland
El Salvador	President Nayib Bukele	Mercedes-Benz W220 (official), Lexus LX 570, Hummer H3, Jeep Grand Cherokee SRT-8, Chevrolet Suburban and a 200 Series Toyota Land Cruiser	six Toyota Land Cruiser Prados			
Eritrea	president of Eritrea Isaias Afwerki	Mercedes-Benz W222 S500	Toyota Land Cruiser J200 and Nissan Patrol			
Estonia	President Alar Karis	Audi A8L	Audi Q7	coat of arms of Estonia	Audi A8 of the former Estonian President Toomas Hendrik Ilves in 2012	During the first republic (1918–1940), the first president, Konstantin Päts, preferred American cars, such as the Studebaker Dictator. After officially becoming a president in 1938, he also bought a Packard Super 8 Touring Sedan, and in the following year a Studebaker Commander Cruising Sedan.
Estonia	Prime minister of Estonia Kristen Michal	Audi A8L				The car was registered in 2015.
Eswatini	King of Eswatini Mswati III	Rolls Royce Ghost				He also bought a fleet consisting of Rolls Royces and many BMWs to his 15 wives.
Ethiopia	president of Ethiopia Taye Atske Selassie	Nissan Patrol Platinum				
Ethiopia	Prime minister of Ethiopia Abiy Ahmed	armored Toyota Land Cruiser J200	Toyota Land Cruisers			A fleet of Roewe 750s are used to transport visiting foreign dignitaries.
Fiji	president of Fiji Naiqama Lalabalavu	armored Toyota Land Cruiser Prado				
Finland	President of Finland Alexander Stubb	armored Audi A8 L Security quattro		coat of arms of Finland	The presidential state car of Finland features the coat of arms of Finland on its number plate.	An armored Mercedes-Benz W221 S600 is used by the speaker of the Parliament.
Finland	Prime Minister of Finland Petteri Orpo	grey armoured Mercedes-Benz S600 Guard				The Finnish cabinet's carpool consists of the BMW 5-Series and the Mercedes E-Class models.
Åland	Premier of Åland Katrin Sjögren	Volvo S80				
France	President Emmanuel Macron	Renault Rafale and DS 7 Crossback (investiture) open top Citroën SM Présidentielle models (ceremonial); DS N°8 armoured Peugeot 5008, and Renault Espace (daily travel); ACMAT military command car (parade)			The Citroën DS5 used by François Hollande as his presidential state vehicle, in July 2012	For more details, see Presidential car (France)
French Guiana	President of the Assembly Gabriel Serville	Renault Talisman				
French Polynesia	President of French Polynesia	Dacia Duster	Dacia Duster and Ford Ranger police cars			
Guadeloupe	President of Regional Council	Toyota Land Cruiser Prado				
Martinique	President of Regional Council of Martinique	Renault Talisman				
Mayotte	President of Departamental Council of Mayotte	Toyota Land Cruiser				
New Caledonia	President of the Government of New Caledonia	Toyota Land Cruiser Prado				
Réunion	President of Regional Council	Toyota Land Cruiser J300				
Saint Pierre and Miquelon	President of Collectivity Bernard Briand	Peugeot 607				
Wallis and Futuna	Administrator Superior of Wallis and Futuna and Assembly President	Toyota Land Cruiser				
Gabon	Brice Oligui Nguema	armored Mercedes-Benz W222 S600	Toyota Land Cruiser and Jeep Grand Cherokee			
Gambia	president of Gambia Adama Barrow	Toyota Land Cruiser J300				
Georgia	President Mikheil Kavelashvili	Mercedes-Benz W221 S600 Pullman	Audi Q7 Mercedes Benz E Class and Range Rover Vogue		Mercedes-Benz S-Class W221 of the Georgian president arriving to the presidential palace in 2016	
Germany	President Frank Walter Steinmeier	armored Mercedes-Benz S600 W222 armored Audi A8L and armored BMW 7 Series Limousine		0–1	The armored Mercedes-Benz W221 used by the president of Germany, with number plates 0 ⁑ 1	The president is (besides the minister of defense) the only German official whose official car regularly shows a flag (a version of the president's standard) placed on the front of the hood.
East Germany	former Communist Party general secretary Erich Honecker	stretched Citroën CX and Volvo 700 Series models.			Citroen CX used by Erich Honecker at the Dresden Transport Museum	The former East Germany manufactured the Trabant and Wartburg, both deemed unsuitable for state car usage. The leaders of the country used Soviet-made cars and Swedish Volvo models.
Ghana	President of Ghana John Mahama	armored Mercedes-Benz S-Class W222 S600. and a customized bulletproof Toyota Land Cruiser LC300 Xtreme Edition	armored Toyota Land Cruiser J300			
Greece	Prime Minister of Greece Kyriakos Mitsotakis	Lexus RX Hybrid				Kyriakos Mitsotakis was also seen driving personally a Tesla Model 3 while past prime ministers have also used a Rolls-Royce Silver Shadow Long-Wheelbase Limousine.
Greece	President of Greece Konstantinos Tasoulas	armored Mercedes S-Class S500 (W 220), and later the S500 L (221 series)				The former Greek monarchs in the 1930s used a Maybach Zeppelin. while the official state car of the king of Greece in the 1960s was a 1959 Rolls-Royce Silver Wraith (LHLW44 chassis).
Grenada	Governor general of Grenada Cécile La Grenade	white BMW 750Li		crown license plate		
Grenada	Prime minister Dickon Mitchell	black BMW 750Li	police motorcycle outriders and two black Toyota Land Cruiser Prado	Grenadian flag and a coat of arms		
Guatemala	President Bernardo Arévalo	Chevrolet Suburban	black Toyota Land Cruiser Prado			
Guernsey	Lieutenant Governor of Guernsey Richard Cripwell	red Rolls-Royce Silver Spirit lll			Daimler DS420 of the Lieutenant Governor in 2012.	Previously a Daimler DS420 was used until 2014.
Guyana	President Irfaan Ali	Toyota Crown or a Lexus LS 460; Toyota Prado or a Toyota Land Cruiser (both used in longer journeys)		presidential emblem of a gold cacique's crown		
Guyana	Prime Minister Mark Phillips	Toyota Crown; Toyota Prado or a Toyota Land Cruiser (both used in longer journeys)		gold depiction of coat of arms of Guyana		
Guinea	Interim President and CNRD Chairman Mamady Doumbouya	Toyota Land Cruiser J200				
Guinea-Bissau	president of Guinea-Bissau Horta Na Man	Mercedes-Benz W222 S600	Toyota Land Cruiser and Hummer H2			
Haiti	Acting president Alix Didier Fils-Aimé	Dartz Prombron	motorcycles, Toyota Land cruiser 70 Series, Nissan Patrols and Nissan Frontiers	golden "President of the Republic" plates		
Honduras	President Nasry Asfura	black armored Toyota Land Cruiser	police bikes, Toyota Fortuner, Toyota Land Cruiser Prado and Toyota Hilux			
Hong Kong	Chief Executive of Hong Kong John Lee	BMW 7 Series (G11) and a Toyota Alphard	BMW R1200RT motorbikes	Emblem of Hong Kong	BMW 7 Series the Official car of the Chief Executive of Hong Kong in 2021	Senior government officials, including the chief secretary, Eric Chan chief justice Andrew Cheung are assigned a Lexus LS (XF50) while the commissioner of police Raymond Siu is assigned a BMW 5 Series (F10) with the number plate "1". The president of the Legislative Council Andrew Leung is driven in a Lexus GS450h, with the number plate "LC1". Other government vehicles in general have the "AM" prefix on their plates.
Hungary	Hungarian Government	armored Audi A8Ls, Audi A7, Audi Q7, and Audi A6; Škoda Superb				
Hungary	Prime Minister Viktor Orbán	Volkswagen Multivan				In December 2023 during its visit to Hungary the Turkish president Recep Tayyip Erdoğan gifted Orbán with a Togg T10X an electric car made by the Turkish Company Togg.
Iceland	President Halla Tómasdóttir	Lexus LS600hL; Audi A8L and 1942 Packard (ceremonial use)		"1"	Official plate of the Icelandic Presidential Car	
India	President of India Droupadi Murmu	black Mercedes S600 Pullman Guard, custom-built to a BR7-level armour standard	the former presidential car, a black Mercedes-Benz armoured limousine, which is used as a spare vehicle	Emblem of India	Emblem of India used in the Indian President's Mercedes-Benz W221 S600 Pullman	Recently seen travelling in a BMW G70 armoured limousine
India	Vice President of India C. P. Radhakrishnan	BMW X5				
India	Prime minister Narendra Modi	Range Rover Sentinel with BR7-level, BR7-level highly modified armoured BMW 7 Series, armored Toyota Land Cruiser and Mercedes-Maybach S650 Pullman Guard	several Toyota Fortuners, Mahindra Scorpios, BMW X5s, Tata Safaris, Range Rovers, Toyota Land Cruisers, Mercedes-Maybach S650 Guards, and a jammer vehicle along with a Mercedes-Benz Sprinter			When visiting a foreign country, Indian leaders generally use vehicles supplied by the host country.
Indonesia	President of Indonesia Prabowo Subianto	Mercedes-Benz S680 Guard; Pindad Maung MV3 Garuda Limousine and Anoa (used in military exercises)	Mercedes-Benz GLS, Mercedes-Benz G-Class, Toyota Land Cruiser, Toyota Fortuner, or Mazda CX-9 models; Volkswagen Caravelle carrying a communications jammer device; Toyota HiAce and Toyota Alphard vehicles; Yamaha FZ1 motorcycles	"RI 1" or "INDONESIA 1"	Pindad MV 3 Garuda is the official car of the President of Republic of Indonesia since 2024. Mercedes-Benz S680 Guard used as presidential state car currently	The Vice President of Indonesia is driven in a similar car bearing similar attributes also an older BMW X5 was notably used by former president Susilo Bambang Yudhoyono during the 2007 Jakarta flood.
Indonesia	Parliamentary Leadership	Toyota Alphard | Maung Pindad MV 3 Garuda Limousine | Lexus LM	The Speaker And Deputy Speaker is driven and escorted with Toyota Crown 2.5 HV G-Executive or even Maung Pindad MV 3 Garuda Limousine for bulletproof and anti ballistic bomb. Speaker And Deputy sometimes use MPV car such as Lexus LM, Alphard, Denza D9, Xpeng X9 or even the limousine in indonesia for travel and visit and even holiday for security and protocol system and regulations			
Cabinet ministers	Toyota Crown, Hyundai Ioniq 5, or Genesis Electrified G80 models	black Nissan X-Trail or Toyota Fortuner				
Iran	supreme leader Ali Khamenei and the current president of Iran Masoud Pezeshkian	Toyota Cressida, and BMW 5 Series,				A 1977 Peugeot 504 was used by Mahmoud Ahmadinejad.
Iraq	President Abdul Latif Rashid	BMW E67 760 Li	Nissan Patrol			While in power, Saddam Hussein normally traveled in a white 1988 Mercedes-Benz W126, and also bought a large fleet of luxury cars for himself and his family. Some were classic American cars, many from the era of Al Capone of whom Saddam Hussein was an admirer.
Iraq	Prime minister Mohammed Shia' Al Sudani	armoured Chevrolet Tahoe along with a Toyota Land Cruiser and a Chevrolet Suburban				
Ireland	former Taoiseach (Prime Minister) Leo Varadkar	dark blue 2019 Lexus LS hybrid	Audi A6 or a BMW 5 Series, motorcycle outriders, marked and unmarked patrol cars (for sensitive events or security risk)			
Ireland	President of Ireland Catherine Connolly	blue 2017 BMW 7-Series LWB; Rolls-Royce Silver Wraith landaulette (ceremonial)	led by Garda Síochána motorbikes marked patrol car unmarked cars from the Special Detective Unit, usually the BMW 5 Series, Volvo S90 and/or Audi A6 occasionally a vehicle from the Garda Emergency Response Unit (for increased security); Captain's Escort of Honour: motorcycles, currently 2019 Honda 750X models (ceremonial occasions)	ZJ 5000 (Presidential State Car)	Rolls-royce Silver Wraith landaulette used in ceremonial and state occasions in 2017	When the president or Taoiseach visits Northern Ireland, they are driven in armoured vehicles and security in their motorcade increases.
Isle of Man	lieutenant governor of the Isle of Man Sir John Lorimer	black BMW	MAN-1			When the lieutenant governor is aboard, it flies the lieutenant governor's standard
Israel	prime minister of Israel Benjamin Netanyahu	Audi A8	Toyota Land Cruisers, Lexus IS 250, and Volvo S80			
Israel	President of Israel Isaac Herzog	Volvo S80 stretch limousine and an Audi A8			Volvo S80 Limousine owned by Israeli government in 2011.	
Italy	president of Italy Sergio Mattarella	Lancia Flaminia 355 Presidenziale (important state occasions) several armoured Maserati Quattroporte VI, a Lancia Thesis Stola S85 limousine and two identical Audi A8L and a three-wheeled Piaggio Ape Calessino (at summer residence)	Alfa Romeo 159, 166, Stelvio and Giulia, Audi A6 and A8, Bentley Continental Flying Spur, BMW 5 Series and 7 Series, Lancia Thesis and Lancia Thema, Maserati Quattroporte V and VI, Mercedes-Benz W212 and W221 models		The Lancia Flaminia 355 Presidenziale, a vehicle commissioned by Italy in 1960, and still used as a presidential vehicle in Italy	
Ivory Coast	president of Ivory Coast Alassane Ouattara	Mercedes-Maybach W222 S600				
Jamaica	governor-general of Jamaica Patrick Allen	modified BMW 740Li		state crown	The official state car for the governor-general of Jamaica is a BMW 740Li, featuring a license plate bearing the Crown.	
Jamaica	prime minister of Jamaica Andrew Holness	modified BMW 740Li	dark blue BMW 5 Series	standard private license plate	The Prime Minister's BMW 5 Series F10 in 2016	
Jamaica	Ministers of government	Toyota Prado or Mitsubishi Pajero	Toyota RAV4 or a vehicle of similar class	either government plates (yellow plates with black numbering) or civilian plates with tags		The Government of Jamaica also maintains a fleet of modified BMW 5 Series as protocol vehicles for visiting foreign dignitaries.
Japan	Emperor Naruhito and Empress of Japan Masako	specially prepared G51 Toyota Century Royal limousines and a hybrid G60 Toyota Century convertible parade car	Toyota Crowns and standard Toyota Century vehicles		The Toyota Century Royal is a specially prepared custom car built for the Japanese imperial family. It features the imperial logo in place of a license plate.	The primary car used by the emperor and empress is referred to as "Empress 1". Two of the Century Royals are assigned to the Ministry of Foreign Affairs for use by visiting dignitaries. The Imperial Household Agency is responsible for maintaining the imperial fleet, which includes horse-drawn state carriages for ceremonial events and the presentation of credentials by ambassadors, one of only a few nations that still maintain them.
Japan	prime minister of Japan Sanae Takaichi	• armored Toyota Century (G60) • armored Lexus LS 600h L (UVF-46) (used as an alternative vehicle to the Century) • armored Century SUV (G70)			Lexus LS600hl used by former Japanese Prime Minister Shinzo Abe in 2019	For more details, see Prime Minister's Official Car (Japan)
Jersey	Lieutenant Governor of Jersey Sir Jerry Kyd	Chrysler Town & Country			Chrysler Town & Country of the Lieutenant governor featuring its standard in 2009.	
Jordan	king of Jordan Abdullah ll	Mercedes-Maybach S600 Pullman	black Cadillac Escalades and BMW motorcycles			
Kazakhstan	president of Kazakhstan Kassym-Jomart Tokayev	armored Mercedes-Maybach W222 S600 Guard; Aurus Senat and a Togg T10X (gifted by the Turkish president)	Lexus LS Audi A8 and Range Rover			
Kyrgyzstan	president of Kyrgyzstan Sadyr Japarov	bulletproof Mercedes-Maybach W222 S600 Pullman Guard.	Toyota Land Cruiser			
Kenya	president of Kenya William Ruto	armoured Mercedes-Benz Pullman S600 (most common) armoured Range Rover Vogue armoured Toyota Land Cruiser several other Mercedes-Benz and an open top military Land Cruiser (state functions)	several Mercedes-Benz E-Classes, BMW 5 Series, a Range Rover, Toyota Land Cruisers and an ambulance	Kenyan coat of arms (most common); CIC (state functions)		Cabinet ministers are supplied with Volkswagen Passats, Mercedes-Benz E & S – Classes and Toyota Land Cruisers in addition to other vehicles in the ministerial car pool.
Kiribati	President of Kiribati Taneti Maamau	Toyota Land Cruiser Prado	Toyota Hilux			
Kosovo	President of Kosovo Vjosa Osmani	Audi A8	Chevrolet Tahoe Nissan Xterra			
Kuwait	emir of Kuwait Mishal Al-Ahmad Al-Jaber Al-Sabah	BMW 7 Series or a Mercedes-Maybach (daily use); Rolls-Royce or a Bentley (state occasions)	GMC Yukon Denalis and marked police vehicles			
Laos	General Secretary of the Lao People's Revolutionary Party Thongloun Sisoulith prime minister Sonexay Siphandone; Politburo members	Toyota Camry (XV50); Toyota Land Cruiser (used by prime minister)				The Lao government used to use luxury cars from Europe such as the Mercedes-Benz S-Class and BMW 7 Series. In 2016, former Prime Minister Thongloun Sisoulith announced a switch to a reasonably affordable car to reduce costs also on 12 July 2024 Vietnamese General-Secretary To Lam gave 20 electric Vinfast cars as a gift during his two-day diplomatic visit to Laos.
Latvia	president of Latvia Edgars Rinkēvičs	Lexus LS 600h L or a Mercedes-Benz S-Class		coat of arms of Latvia	The Mercedes S-Class of the Latvian president in 2015	Most Saeima members use the Volvo 900 series, Audi A6 and Mercedes-Benz E-Class, but Volvo S80s, Volvo S70s and other luxury sedans are also used.
Lebanon	President Joseph Aoun	W221 Mercedes-Benz S600 Guard armored limousine or Y63 Nissan Patrol	Ford Expedition, Ford Excursion and GMC Yukon an armored W140 Mercedes-Benz S600 possibly used as a back-up limo W220 Mercedes-Benz S500L models J200 Land Cruiser			The most notable motorcade was former Prime Minister Saad Hariri's, which contained around 25 cars, six armoured W220 Mercedes S600, a dozen J200 Land Cruisers, some Chevrolet Tahoes and some Nissan Xterras used as spotting cars.
Lesotho	King of Lesotho Letsie III	Lexus LS460 and Audi A8				
Liberia	president of Liberia Joseph Boakai	black bulletproof Mercedes-Benz W222 S-class	Nissan SUVs			Previous presidents, such as Charles Taylor and Samuel Doe, were also driven in Mercedes-Benz cars. Some claim that Doe had purchased over 60 luxury Mercedes, which cost over US$60,000 each.
Libya	Chairman of the Presidential Council Mohamed al-Menfi	Mercedes-Benz S-Class W222				
Liechtenstein	monarch of Liechtenstein Hans-Adam II, the Regent Alois and the Prime Minister Brigitte Haas	Mercedes-Benz W222 S600	BMW X5s		The car of the monarch of Liechtenstein in Vaduz in 2018	
Lithuania	president Gitanas Nausėda	armoured BMW 7 (F01)				The first official Lithuanian state car was bought in 1919 from Germany. It was a Benz 25/55PS with four cylinder, 6.3-liter engine. The car had a Vytis symbol on the left back door and Lithuanian flags in the front. The car was used by Antanas Smetona and Aleksandras Stulginskis.
Luxembourg	Grand Duke Guillaume V and his family	Audi A8 or similar vehicle Daimler DS420 limousine and a Bentley Mulsanne (used in important state occasions)		large gold crown (from the Luxembourg coat of arms) on a plain white background	The grand duke of Luxembourg exiting from his Audi A8, in May 2023	Official cars used by other members of the ruling family of Luxembourg normally display registration plates that have an orange stripe over a blue stripe (the flag of the House of Nassau-Weilburg), without any numbers.
Macau	chief executive of Macau Sam Hou Fai	cars from European brands like Mercedes-Benz, Audi or Volvo		special plates reserved for government officials		
Malaysia	King Yang di-Pertuan Agong Ibrahim Iskandar	a stretched red Bentley Arnage, a dark-blue Bentley Continental Flying Spur, or a black Maybach 62		yellow number plate with the personal logo of the monarch		
Malaysia	sultans of Malaysia	Rolls-Royce Phantom, Mercedes-Benz S-Class, BMW 7 Series, Bentley Mulsanne, Lexus LS, Maybach 62, and Genesis G90L			Rolls-Royce Phantom of Abdul Halim of Kedah, 14th Yang di-Pertuan Agong, in 2013.	
Malaysia	prime minister of Malaysia Anwar Ibrahim	stretched Proton Perdana; Mercedes-Benz W223 S-Class and a Toyota Vellfire; Proton Perdana Executive Limousine (within the Klang Valley) armoured Toyota Vellfire (used as a private vehicle)	Pasukan Gerakan Khas using armoured versions of the Volvo XC90, Proton X70, and the Honda CRV as well as the Honda VFR800, Kawasaki GTR and the Yamaha FJR1300	black-and-white plate (with full title)	Proton Perdana Limousine used by the Prime Minister of Malaysia	Under the guidelines of Malaysia's automotive policies, cars for use by federal and state government officials are required to be of national brands, primarily Proton.
Maldives	president of Maldives Mohamed Muizzu	a black Mercedes-Benz E-Class (W212), a white Mercedes-Benz C-Class (W204) and a black Mercedes-Benz S-Class (W222)	Toyota Land Cruiser and Toyota Hilux			
Mali	interim president of Mali Assimi Goïta	Range Rover Vogue	Toyota Land Cruiser J200 and Toyota Hilux			
Madagascar	president of Madagascar Michael Randrianirina	armored Mercedes-Benz S600 W222 Toyota Land Cruiser J200	Toyota Land Cruiser J200 and Jeep Commander			
Malawi	Former president of Malawi, Bingu wa Mutharika	an armored Black Mercedes-Benz S-Class, a Toyota Land Cruiser or a Range Rover	four Hummer H3 and eight escort motorcycles			
Malta	President Myriam Spiteri Debono	a pair of Vanden Plas Princess limousines, one dating from 1960 and the other, a convertible, from 1955				
Malta	Prime Minister of Malta Robert Abela	Alfa Romeo Giulia and Land Rover Range Rover			Alfa Romeo 159 of former Prime Minister Joseph Muscat in Valletta in 2017	He also uses a BMW 3 Series PHEV and is the only vehicle in the country with no license plates and was also seen using a Ford Kuga.
Mauritania	president of Mauritania Mohamed Ould Ghazouani	armored BMW 7 Series (G11)	Nissan Patrol			
Marshall Islands	president of Marshall Islands Hilda Heine	Chevrolet Tahoe	police cars Toyota Land Cruiser J200 Toyota Land Cruiser Prado and Toyota Hilux			
Mauritius	prime minister of Mauritius Navin Ramgoolam	armored BMW 7 Series (both the 760Li & 750Li)	multiple BMW 5 Series (usually 540i and 550i) and police motorcycles			
Mauritius	President Dharam Gokhool	BMW 750Li or a Mercedes-Benz S600L	BMW 5 Series and at least two police motorcycles			
Mexico	president Claudia Sheinbaum	armored Chevy Suburban				Under the presidency of Andrés Manuel López Obrador, the previous fleet of vehicles were auctioned off for US$3.25 million he has used his own Volkswagen Jetta as his mode of transport sometimes using an armoured Chevrolet Suburban.
Micronesia	President of the Federated States of Micronesia Wesley Simina	Toyota Land Cruiser J200	Toyota Land Cruiser Prado and Toyota Hilux			
Moldova	President Maia Sandu, prime minister Alexandru Munteanu, and speaker of the Parliament Igor Grosu	Mercedes-Benz W221 S500				
Morocco	king of Morocco Mohammed VI	Mercedes-Benz 600 Pullman, Range Rover models (for mountainous places), Mercedes-Benz S500 and various Lexus models	a BMW 5 Series with a communications jammer ambulance and police motorcycles			
Morocco	prime minister of Morocco Aziz Akhannouch	Mercedes-Benz S-Class				
Mozambique	president of Mozambique Daniel Chapo	armored Toyota Land Cruiser	Toyota Land Cruiser, Toyota Alphard, Ford Ranger, Mahindra Scorpio and Mahindra Scorpio pickup			
Monaco	Prince Albert II	one-off Lexus LS 600h L Landaulet hybrid sedan				In addition, he owns a variety of eco friendly cars including a Lexus LS 600h, a BMW Hydrogen 7, a Toyota Prius, a Lexus RX 400h, a Fisker Karma, a Tesla Roadster (2008), and a limited production Venturi Fétish. He also owns a collection of vintage cars, which number over 100, and include prestigious models from Maserati, Jaguar, Mercedes-Benz, Rolls-Royce and Bentley.
Mongolia	President Ukhnaagiin Khürelsükh, Speaker of the Parliament, and prime minister	Mercedes-Benz S-Class	traffic police car and either a Mercedes-Benz G-Class and a Toyota Land Cruiser series 100 or 200	0001 (president); 0002 (Speaker); 0003 (prime minister)		
Montenegro	president of Montenegro Jakov Milatović	Mercedes-Benz S-Class W222				
Montenegro	prime minister of Montenegro Milojko Spajić and state officials	Audi limousines, notably the Audi A8 (used by senior officials); Mercedes-Benz E-Class (used by lower ranked officials); Mercedes M-Class and Volkswagen Passat	BMW 5-Series, police Mercedes A-class VW Golf 4 and VW Golf 5			The first state vehicles were a fleet of vehicles, unknown by model names, probably from Austria-Hungary, Germany, France, Russia and the United Kingdom. They were bought in the period 1908–1910 and most are seen in a 1910 Coronation video from an archive where Knyaz Nikola I Petrović-Njegoš was proclaimed King of Montenegro.
Myanmar	acting president of Myanmar Min Aung Hlaing	Hongqi H9+ and a convertible Hyundai Equus (used as parade car)	Range Rover Sports and Harley-Davidson motorcycles			
Myanmar	former chairman of State Peace and Development Council (SPDC), Than Shwe	Toyota Crown S180 open-top limousine				
Myanmar	former State Counsellor of Myanmar, Aung San Suu Kyi	armored Mercedes-Benz S-Class	several Toyota Fortuner security vehicles			
Namibia	Former president Hage Geingob	armoured Mercedes-Benz S600Ls, armored black Mercedes-Benz ML500s or an armored Toyota Land Cruiser 200 Series	Mercedes-Benz E500s, Double cab Toyota Hilux 4.0 v6 cars used by the VIPPD and a fleet of police cars			
Namibia	vice president Lucia Witbooi	armoured Mercedes-Benz S550 or S600 or armored Toyota Land Cruiser 200s	Black Mercedes-Benz E250s, Toyota Prado V6 VX, Toyota Hilux Double cab 4.0 V6 and police cars	GRN plate number		
Namibia	former prime minister of Namibia Elijah Ngurare	armored black Mercedes-Benz E500 V8 and Black Toyota Land Cruiser 200s		GRN plates		
Namibia	Cabinet ministers and their deputies	Black Mercedes-Benz E400s and E250s, White toyota Land Cruiser Prado VX V6 or the Toyota Hilux Double cab V6		GRN plates		
Namibia	First Lady	armored Mercedes-Benz E400s, armored Toyota Land Cruisers Prado VX V6	Toyota Corolla 1.8 Exclusive or Hyundai Sonatas			
Nauru	president of Nauru David Adeang	Toyota Hilux	Toyota Hilux and Toyota Land Cruiser Prado			
Nepal	former president of Nepal, Bidya Devi Bhandari	Mercedes-Benz E-Class W210 bulletproof car (daily use) and an armoured stretched Jaguar XJ (used in state occasions)				She also was seen using a BYD e6.
Nepal	former prime minister of Nepal, Baburam Bhattarai	Mustang bullet proof Max four-wheel drive				
Netherlands	King Willem-Alexander	custom-built stretched plug in hybrid Audi A8L 60 TFSI	non-stretched Volvo S80s and a V70, Audi A6 and A8, and Ford Focus, Mondeo and Galaxy for the royal household Royal Stables have a blue Mercedes-Benz Viano and a Volkswagen Crafter VIP bus royal bodyguards drive the Audi A6.	Dutch number plates beginning with AA	A Volvo S80 limousine of the royal household	The members of the royal family also have private vehicles for their own use.
Netherlands	Prime Minister of the Netherlands Rob Jetten	armoured Mercedes-Benz S-Class, sometimes an Audi A6				The former prime minister Mark Rutte was known for his bike rides and he is often seen driving his Saab 9-3.
Aruba	Governor of Aruba Alfonso Boekhoudt	Mercedes-Benz S-Class W223.				A Lexus LS460 was/is also used
Curaçao	Governor of Curaçao Mauritsz de kort	BMW I7.				
Sint Maarten	Governor of Sint Maarten Ajamu Baly	Lexus LS460				
New Zealand	Governor-General Cindy Kiro	BMW i7 xDrive60	Ford Everest	During official travel, it is the only vehicle in the country not required to use standard number plates.	The state car of the Governor-General of New Zealand, a Jaguar XJ, in 2010. The Jaguar XJ was used as the Governor-General's official state car from 1996 to 2011.	While all other state BMWs are silver, the Governor-General's BMW is black.
New Zealand	Prime Minister Christopher Luxon	BMW i7 xDrive60	Ford Everest	CR and numbers		The Prime Minister does not have one specialist vehicle, instead they have access to the "Crown Fleet" which consists of a number of vehicles including the 10 BMW i7 xDrive60, Category 1 vehicles.
Cook Islands	Prime Minister of the Cook Islands Mark Brown	Hyundai Sonata				
Niue	Prime Minister of Niue Dalton Tagelagi	Nissan X-Trail				
Tokelau	Administrator of Tokelau Don Higgins and Ulu-o-Tokelau Esera Fofō Tuisano	Toyota Land Cruiser Prado	Hyundai Tucson police car			
Nicaragua	Co-presidents of Nicaragua Daniel Ortega and Rosario Murillo	Mercedes-Benz G-Class				In the past, the Somoza family used several luxury cars during their 43 years in the presidency. A Mercedes-Benz Type 300 was used for official ceremonies. Others were Mercedes-Benz and Cadillac limousines.
Niger	CNSP President Abdourahamane Tiani	Toyota Land Cruiser				
Nigeria	president of Nigeria Bola Tinubu and other high-profile government officials	black armored Mercedes-Benz S-Class 2016	30 cars and ten escort motorcycles, along with police cars and 6 Mercedes S-550			During his 3-day visit to Malabo in Equatorial Guinea in 2024 Bola Tinubu was seen riding in an Armored black Cadillac Escalade.
North Korea	General Secretary of the Workers' Party of Korea Kim Jong Un	W100 Mercedes-Benz 600 Landaulets (ceremonial use); Mercedes-Maybach W222 S600 Pullman Guards; Rolls-Royce Phantom VII (daily use) and an Aurus Senat (gifted by Putin)			An example of a Mercedes-Benz W100 Landaulet	Kim Jong Un is believed to have a collection of luxury cars including a Range Rover L322 in which he has been seen visiting farms in the countryside following a flood.
North Macedonia	president of North Macedonia Gordana Siljanovska-Davkova	stretched Mercedes-Benz W140				
North Macedonia	Prime Minister of North Macedonia Hristijan Mickoski	armored Mercedes-Benz W221 S600 Guard	VW Passat B8			
Norway	Norwegian royal family	2016 Audi A8 L Extended (formal use) stretched Mercedes E-Class (used as queen's private transport) electric Mercedes-Benz EQS 580 4-matic, electric BMW i7 xDrive60, and a stretched Volvo S90 T8 Limousine Plug-in Hybrid (used by crown prince and crown princess); 2007 Audi A8, an E65 and an E67 BMW 7 Series, vintage 1966 Lincoln Continental convertible, stretched and a Cadillac Deville		A-1 to A-9	Audi A8L used by the King with the plate A-2 in 2015 Norwegian license plate that reads A-9. Official state cars of the Norwegian royal family typically feature a license plate numbered from A-1 to A-9.	
Norway	Prime Minister Jonas Gahr Støre	armoured Mercedes-Benz W222 S600L				
Svalbard	Governor of Svalbard Lars Fause	Toyota Land Cruiser Prado				
Oman	former Sultan Qaboos	2 Maroon-colored 2007 model Mercedes S-Class pullman 4 Red-colored 2003 model Mercedes S600 pullman 4 Maybach 62; And a number of khaki-colored Range Rover Vogue cars				The former Sultan's garage also had cars from brands like Rolls-Royce Lamborghini Ferrari SRT Aston Martin Mercedes-Benz and BMW.
Pakistan	President Asif Ali Zardari and Prime Minister Shehbaz Sharif	Mercedes-Benz S-Class W222 Guard (used by Prime Minister) and a BMW 7-Series High Security (used by President)	Armoured Toyota Land Cruisers, Toyota Hilux Revos, BMW X5s, Islamabad Police Toyota Prius and Corolla (under the security division of Islamabad Police) and occasionally Mercedes-Benz G-Class 55			
Palau	president of Palau Surangel Whipps Jr.	Lincoln Town Car	Nissan X Trail			
Palestine	President of Palestine Mahmoud Abbas	Mercedes-Benz S-Class W220				
Panama	president of Panama José Raúl Mulino	black armored Chevrolet Suburban	Ford Explorer, Toyota Land Cruiser, 400cc motorcycles			
Papua New Guinea	Prime Minister of Papua New Guinea James Marape	Range Rover Vogue				Previously the government of Papua New Guinea had a fleet of Maserati Quattroportes bought in 2018 to transport visiting dignitaries during the Asia-Pacific Economic Cooperation conference this caused controversy and eventually in October 2021 the fleet was sold.
Paraguay	president of Paraguay Santiago Peña	convertible Rolls Royce Corniche (saw in Santiago Pena's inauguration) Hongqi H7 (daily use) and a Chevrolet Suburban (used in rural travel)	black Nissan Patrol Y61s			
Peru	president of Peru José María Balcázar	black armoured Lexus LS460hL and a 1973 Chrysler Lebaron (used at the presidential palace)			Chrysler Lebaron at the presidential palace in 2006 it was auctioned by the Peruvian government in 2007	In May 2015, Lexus was chosen by President Ollanta Humala as the official car brand of the Government.
Philippines	president Bongbong Marcos	2023 model Mercedes-Maybach S-Class; Toyota Land Cruiser (J300); Cadillac Escalade and a Lincoln Continental Coach Door Edition	identical backup car, several SUVs, an ambulance, police vehicles and police motorcycle escorts	license plate number "1"	A Mercedes-Maybach S-Class at the 2023 Palarong Pambansa	Selected past presidential cars are on permanent display at the Presidential Car Museum within the Quezon Memorial Circle, in Quezon City.
Portugal	president of Portugal Marcelo Rebelo de Sousa	an armoured Mercedes-Benz S600 W222, a Mercedes-Benz C-Class W205 a BMW 760Li (E67), or a Mercedes-Benz E250 CDI BlueEFFICIENCY		'P R' (meaning 'Presidency of the Republic'), with the armillary sphere of Portugal between the P and the R	A Mercedes-Benz S600 used by the president of Portugal	
Portugal	prime minister of Portugal Luís Montenegro	Mercedes-Benz S350 BlueTec, Volkswagen Phaeton 5.0 V10 TDI, or a Nissan Leaf				An Audi A8L is used to transport visiting foreign dignitaries.
Poland	president of Poland Karol Nawrocki	BMW 7 Protection (G73)	Mercedes-Benz S 600 Guard (W222)		Presidential motorcade of the Polish President Andrzej Duda in 2019 the President's car on the middle is an armored Audi A8L security	For more details, see Official transport in Poland.
Qatar	emir of Qatar Sheikh Tamim bin Hamad Al Thani	Bentley Mulsanne Grand Limousine	Mercedes-Benz S-Class, Mercedes-Benz G-Class, Nissan Frontier and Range Rover			
Republic of the Congo	President of the Republic of the Congo Denis Sassou Nguesso	armored Mercedes-Maybach W222 S600 Pullman	Toyota Land Cruiser J200			
Romania	President Nicușor Dan	Mercedes-Benz S500 limousine, the BMW 5 Series and a BMW 7 Series				Members of the Romanian Government often used cars of the autochthonous brand Dacia, namely the Logan and the Duster. Romanian diplomats have been seen using a wide range of cars, ranging from high-end Mercedes-Benz and BMW models to Volkswagen, Škoda or Renault.
Russia	President Vladimir Putin	• Aurus Senat limousine • Aurus Komendant	Mercedes G-Class, Mercedes E-Class, standard S-Class models, BMW 5 Series Volkswagen Caravelle, and police motorcycle outriders	В776УС/77	Aurus Senat limousine in use during the 2018 inauguration of Vladimir Putin	For more details see Presidential state car (Russia)
Rwanda	president of Rwanda Paul Kagame	Audi A8 or a Mercedes S600	Rwanda National Police special vehicles			Paul Kagame also has been seen in an armoured Range Rover Sentinel.
Saint Kitts and Nevis	Prime minister of Saint Kitts and Nevis Terrance Drew	Lexus LS600	Toyota Land Cruiser Prado	Coat of arms of Saint Kitts and Nevis		
Saint Lucia	Governor-general of Saint Lucia Errol Charles	BMW 7 Series (G11)		crown		
Saint Lucia	Prime Minister of Saint Lucia Philip J. Pierre	Toyota Land Cruiser Prado	Toyota Prados			
Saint Vincent and the Grenadines	Prime Minister of Saint Vincent and the Grenadines Godwin Friday	Toyota Land Cruiser Prado				
Samoa	O le Ao o le Malo Tuimalealiʻifano Vaʻaletoʻa Sualauvi II	Hyundai Santa Fe				
San Marino	captains regent Matteo Rossi and Lorenzo Bugli	Audi A8			Audi A8s of the two heads of state of San Marino in 2024.	Members of the Palazzo Publico use BMWs.
São Tomé and Príncipe	president of São Tomé and Príncipe Carlos Vila Nova and Prime Minister Américo Ramos	Toyota Land Cruiser Prado	Toyota Land Cruiser J200 Toyota Land Cruiser Prado and Nissan Patrol			
Saudi Arabia	king of Saudi Arabia Salman	Mercedes S-600s; S600 Pullman	Toyota Landcruisers, GMC Yukons, Chevrolet Tahoes and Suburbans, Cadillac Escalades, GMC Sierra 3500HD pickups, and GMC Savanah ambulances			Some BMW 7-series are also used to welcome guests and politicians.
Senegal	president of Senegal Bassirou Diomaye Faye	armored Toyota Land Cruiser J200	Toyota Land Cruiser J200 and J300			
Serbia	president of Serbia Aleksandar Vučić	Audi A8L Security				VIP delegations that are in visit to Serbia use an armoured Mercedes-Benz S-Class W221 (S 600 Guard) with B6/B7 resistance level that was the car that former presidents used.
Seychelles	president of Seychelles Patrick Herminie	Toyota Land Cruiser J300	Toyota Land Cruiser J300 and J200 and Toyota Land Cruiser Prado			The former president Danny Faure used an armored BMW 7 Series (F01) High Security
Sierra Leone	president of Sierra Leone Julius Maada Bio	Mercedes-Maybach GLS 600.	black Toyota Land Cruiser Prado			
Singapore	president of Singapore Tharman Shanmugaratnam	white 2022 Mercedes-Benz S450L		SEP1 or presidential crest	The presidential state car for Singapore in 2024	
Singapore	prime minister Lawrence Wong	silver BMW 750Li		S1	Lexus LS600h the former official car used by the former Prime Minister Lee Hsien Loong in 2014	A small fleet of cars that include an armoured Audi A8 W12, an armoured BMW 7 series and a Lexus LS460L (the previous official car for the prime minister) are maintained by the state for the transport of visiting dignitaries.
Slovakia	president of Slovakia Peter Pellegrini	armored Mercedes-Benz Pullman (used in state occasions) armored Audi A8, Mercedes-Benz S-Class, BMW 7 Series, Volkswagen Phaeton, Range Rover, BMW X5, and Škoda Superb (daily travel)			A Mercedes-Benz belonging to the Slovak Office for the Protection of Constitutional Officials and Diplomatic Missions in 2013	
Slovenia	Slovenian president Nataša Pirc Musar	Audi A8	Audi Q7, Volkswagen Touareg and BMW X5			She also owns a Rolls-Royce Phantom VI formerly owned by Princess Alexandra
Slovenia	Prime minister of Slovenia Robert Golob	Mercedes Benz S-Class	Audi Q7, Volkswagen Touareg and BMW X5			
Solomon Islands	Prime Minister of Solomon Islands Jeremiah Manele	Toyota Land Cruiser J200	Toyota Land Cruiser J200 and Toyota Land Cruiser Prado			
Somalia	President and Prime Minister of Somalia Hassan Sheikh Mohamud and Hamza Abdi Barre	identical armoured Toyota Land Cruiser 200 (black for president, white for prime minister)		flag of Somalia		
South Africa	president of South Africa Cyril Ramaphosa	armored BMW 7 Series or on some occasions a Mercedes-Benz S-Class	numerous BMW X5, Jeep Grand Cherokee, BMW 3-Series and Mercedes-Benz ML-Class models, followed by a number of Mercedes-Benz V-Class			
South Korea	president of South Korea Lee Jae Myung	• Mercedes-Maybach S650 Guard (W222) • Cadillac Escalade • Genesis G90 LWB Bulletproof	Mercedes-Maybach S650 Guard (W222),Mercedes-Benz S-Class (W223) and Cadillac Escalade			The Ministry of Foreign Affairs Cho Tae-yul uses an armored Cadillac DTS limousine by Alpine Armoring and an armored Hyundai Equus limousine for foreign dignitaries Each vehicle was acquired between 2010 and 2011 also in September 2023 Yoon Suk Yeol was seen riding in a convertible Genesis G90 during a ceremony to mark the 75th Armed Forces Day in Seongnam. for more details, see Presidential state car (South Korea), Transportation of the President of South Korea, and List of official vehicles of the president of South Korea.
South Ossetia	President of South Ossetia Alan Gagloev	BMW 7 Series				
Spain	Spanish royal family	Cadillac Broughams, Audi A6s and Mercedes-Benz S-Class; Rolls-Royce Phantom IV (used in major ceremonial occasions)	BMW 5 Series		Two Rolls-Royce Phantom IV cars, used for state ceremonies in Spain	
Spain	prime minister Pedro Sánchez and deputy prime minister María Jesús Montero	Audi A8L	Audi A8L, Mercedes-Benz S600 and Audi A6			
Sri Lanka	president of Sri Lanka Anura Kumara Dissanayake	armored Black Mercedes Maybach S-Class (Guard) or an armored Black BMW 7 Series	marked and unmarked President's Security Division vehicles	only vehicle in the country not required to use standard number plates		
Sri Lanka	Chief of Defence Staff	Black BMW 7-Series	two Land Rover Defenders and other VIP Jeeps and sedans depending on the occasion			This is known as the Staff Car of the CDS.
South Sudan	president of South Sudan Salva Kiir	armored Toyota Land Cruiser J200	Toyota Land Cruiser J200s and J300s			
Sudan	chairman of Transitional Sovereignty Council of Sudan Abdel Fattah al-Burhan	Mercedes-Benz S300 W221; Nissan Patrol (used in rural places) and a Hyundai Sonata				Ministers usually travel in Toyotas Land Cruisers 70.
Suriname	president of Suriname Jennifer Geerlings-Simons	Toyota Land Cruiser and a Cadillac Escalade.	Toyota Hilux Nissan Patrol and Mitsubishi Pajero			
Sweden	king of Sweden Carl XVI Gustaf	stretched Volvo S80 and a Daimler DS420 limousine (used in ceremonial events)	BMW X5, BMW 5 Series and Mercedes-Benz E-Class		A Daimler DS420 limousine is used for major state ceremonies in Sweden.	The Saab 9-5 and the Volvo XC90 are also used to transport members of the Swedish royal family also the Swedish king was seen driving a BMW M4 Competition (that was seen arriving at the Salzburg Opera Festival).
Sweden	Prime Minister of Sweden Ulf Kristersson	armored Audi A8 L				
Switzerland	Federal councillors	BMW i7 xDrive60				Swiss Councillors can buy a new car every four years.
Syria	president of Syria Ahmed al-Sharaa	Varied (Mercedes-Benz S-Class (W222) (Note: Seen when he visited Turkey.), Aurus Senat (Note: Seen in one during his visit to Russia.), Audi A8, Chevrolet Suburban (Note: Seen in one during his visit to the United States.), Toyota Land Cruiser (J300) (Note: Seen leaving one during his visit to Aleppo.)	Toyota Land Cruiser (J300), Chevrolet Suburban			
Taiwan	President Lai Ching-te	• armored BMW 760i xDrive Protection (G73) • BMW 7 Series (G70) • Land Rover Discovery (L462) • Land Rover Discovery 4 (LR4) • Kia Carnival (KA4)	BMW 7 Series (G70), Land Rover Discovery (L462), Volkswagen Transporter (T6.1), Audi A8 L (D5,Typ 4N) and Toyota Camry (XV50)	BXC-16**	The presidential motorcade for Ma Ying-jeou, which features several BMW 7 Series	The president of the Republic of China has historically traveled in Cadillac sedans, reflecting the ROC's close relations with the United States. Chiang Kai-shek's two armored Cadillacs are on exhibition in the Chiang Kai-shek Memorial Hall in Taipei For more details see Presidential state car (Republic of China).
Tajikistan	president of Tajikistan Emomali Rahmon	armored black Mercedes-Benz S-Class W222 S600 Guard	Toyota Land Cruisers			
Tunisia	president of Tunisia Kais Saied	Mercedes-Benz W221 S600 limousine.				He was also seen driving to work in a Peugeot 206 reportedly made in Iran.
Tanzania	president of Tanzania Samia Suluhu Hassan	Kia Quoris and a Toyota Land Cruiser 200 (used in rural travels)	white Toyota Land Cruiser 70s			
Zanzibar	president of Zanzibar Hussein Mwinyi	Mercedes-Benz W221	Mitsubishi Pajeros			
Thailand	King Vajiralongkorn and Queen Suthida	Rolls-Royce Phantom V, Rolls-Royce Phantom VI, Rolls-Royce Silver Spur stretch limousine, Maybach 62, Mercedes-Maybach S650 Pullman Guard (W222), Mercedes-Maybach S650 (W222), Mercedes-Maybach S680 (W223) or a Bentley Mulsanne Grand Limousine	Mercedes-Benz S-Class (W221 and W222), BMW 7 Series (F01 and G11), and Mercedes-Benz V-Class		A Rolls-Royce Phantom VI carrying Vajiralongkorn to an event in 2012	For more details, see Royal transport in Thailand.
Thailand	Sirikit, the queen mother	Cadillac DTS stretch limousine or a modified Volkswagen Caravelle T4 TDi				
Thailand	Princess Maha Chakri Sirindhorn	Lexus LS600hL or a Mercedes-Benz S500 (W221 or a W222) and a modified Mercedes-Benz V-Class (used in unofficial travels)			BMW 760Li E66 of the Princess Maha Chakri Sirindhorn in the royal ceremony that celebrates her birthday in 2010	
Thailand	Princess Bajrakitiyabha	red Mini Cooper S or a lime-green Volkswagen New Beetle				
Thailand	former prime minister Prayut Chan-o-cha	armoured Mercedes-Benz S600 Guard			Mercedes-Benz W221 of former Thai Prime Minister Abhisit Vejjajiva in 2009	In February 2024 former prime minister Srettha Thavisin drove a lime-green Abarth 500e of his daughter to the meeting of Electric Vehicle Policy Committee on government house he was also seen riding in a Lexus LM (that was bought by himself).
Thailand	ministers	Mercedes-Benz S-Class, Toyota Alphard, Volkswagen Caravelle, and Jaguar XJ				
Timor-Leste	President José Ramos-Horta	Toyota Land Cruiser (J70)	Toyota Land Cruiser J70 and Toyota Prado		Daihatsu Taruna used by Xanana Gusmão in 2018.	The first country's president Xanana Gusmão used a Daihatsu Taruna from 2003 to 2007.
Togo	president of Togo Jean-Lucien Savi de Tové	Range Rover Vogue				
Tonga	King Tupou VI	Humber Pullman with landaulette body	Tank 500			Previously, the King George Tupou V traveled around the country in the classic 'black cab', the Austin FX4.
Trinidad and Tobago	president of Trinidad and Tobago Christine Kangaloo	black, armoured, 2020 Lexus ES Sedan	decoy car, two police motorcycles, two 2016 Toyota Land Cruisers Prado as support vehicles and a leading Toyota Camry police vehicle	Coat of Arms in Gold		
Trinidad and Tobago	Prime Minister Kamla Persad-Bissessar	black, armoured, 2016 Mercedes-Benz S-Class (WSS)	decoy car, two police motorcycles, two 2016 Toyota Land Cruisers Prado as support vehicles and a leading Toyota Camry police vehicle	PM-1		
Tuvalu	Prime Minister of Tuvalu Feleti Teo	BMW 7 Series (G70).	Toyota Hilux Toyota Land Cruiser			
Turkey	president of Turkey Recep Tayyip Erdoğan	black ballistic and bullet-proof armoured Mercedes-Benz Maybach S-600 Pullman Guard	SUVs and additional support cars	presidential crest	Turkish president Recep Tayyip Erdoğan greets people from a 1957 Cadillac Series 75 on Victory Day in 2014.	
Turkey	Other government officials	Mercedes S-Class, BMW 7 Series, Audi A8 or the Toyota Land Cruiser				Turkey recently adopted the domestically designed and manufactured Togg T10X as the government's official cars.
Turkmenistan	president of Turkmenistan Serdar Berdimuhamedow	Mercedes-Benz S-Class W222 Togg T10X. Aurus Komendant. and other cars	Mercedes-Benz S-Class Togg T10X and other cars	Government plates		all state cars in the country are white.
Uganda	President Yoweri Museveni	Toyota Land Cruiser 200; Mercedes 600 SEL stretch and a white Mercedes G Wagon (ceremonial)	double cabin pick up trucks and Mitsubishi Pajero models			
Ukraine	president of Ukraine Volodymyr Zelenskyy	armoured Mercedes-Benz S-Class and an armoured 2011 Volkswagen Phaeton in a W12 long version	armoured Porsche Cayenne			
United Arab Emirates	President, Sheikh Mohamed bin Zayed Al Nahyan prime minister Sheikh Mohammed bin Rashid Al Maktoum and royal family	black armored Rolls Royce Phantoms a Mercedes-Benz W222 S600 guard a Maybach 62 and a Land Rover Range Rover	Toyota Land Cruisers and Nissan Patrols			High-ranking officials use the BMW 7 Series while visiting foreign dignitaries are driven in an armored Mercedes-Benz W222 S600 guard
United Kingdom	King Charles III	two Bentley State Limousines and three Rolls-Royces open-top Range Rovers (used in military events); Jaguar and Daimler limousines (used in less formal occasions)		None	Queen Elizabeth II being driven in her Bentley State Limousine during a state visit to Germany, 2015	One state car is usually on display at the Royal Mews. The state cars and official limousines are painted claret and black. For more details, see State and royal cars of the United Kingdom.
United Kingdom	Prime minister Andy Burnham	armoured Range Rover Sentinel models	Range Rover, Land Rover Discovery and Ford Galaxy vehicles and police motorcycle outriders		Jaguar XJ used by former Prime Minister David Cameron in 2014	For more details, see Prime Ministerial Car (United Kingdom).
Anguilla	Governor of Anguilla Julia Crouch	Land Rover Discovery				
Anguilla	Premier of Anguilla Cora Richardson-Hodge	Range Rover				
Bermuda	governor Andrew Murdoch and Premier David Burt	Kia Seltos				Previously a Toyota Camry was used.
British Virgin Islands	governor of the British Virgin Islands Daniel Pruce	grey Royal Service Range Rover		Crown		
Cayman Islands	governor of the Cayman Islands Jane Owen	white 2015 Jaguar XJ.		Crown		Previously a beige Cadillac Deville was used while other senior officials and visiting VIPs use a fleet consisting of armoured Ford Excursions.
Falkland Islands	governor of Falkland Islands Colin Martin-Reynolds	Land Rover Defender				
Gibraltar	chief minister of Gibraltar Fabian Picardo	black Tesla Model S		G1	The Tesla Model S is used as the official car of the Chief Minister of Gibraltar.	
Gibraltar	governor of Gibraltar Ben Bathurst	black Jaguar XJ		Crown	Jaguar XJ used by the governor featuring a silver crown and his standard in 2021	
Montserrat	Governor of Montserrat Harriet Cross	Toyota Land Cruiser Prado				
Saint Helena, Ascension and Tristan da Cunha	Governor of Saint Helena, Ascension and Tristan da Cunha Nigel Phillips	grey Jaguar XF		Crown		
Turks and Caicos Islands	Governor of Turks and Caicos Islands Dileeni Daniel-Selvaratnam	Chevrolet Tahoe				
United States	President Donald Trump	Cadillac One commonly known as "The Beast" (a heavily armored, custom-built limousine based on a GMC Topkick platform)			A current-model US presidential state car in front of the headquarters of the United Nations (September 2018)	For more details, see Presidential state car (United States).
United States	Members of Congress	Lincoln MKS and the Lincoln MKT (most popularly used)				
United States	High-ranking federal officials	armored Chevrolet Suburbans or Chevrolet Tahoes (most commonly used)				
American Samoa	Governor of American Samoa Pula Nikolao Pula	Ford Expedition	Toyota 4runner			
Guam	Governor of Guam Lou Leon Guerrero	Lexus RX				
Northern Mariana Islands	Governor of Northern Mariana Islands David Apatang	Lincoln Navigator				
Puerto Rico	Governor of Puerto Rico Jenniffer González-Colón	Chevrolet Suburban				
US Virgin Islands	Governor of US Virgin Islands Albert Bryan	Cadillac XTS				
Uruguay	former President Tabaré Vázquez	armoured 2005 Chevrolet Vectra				After 2010, the official state car was no longer used Jose Mujica instead drove a Volkswagen Beetle. also the former President Luis Lacalle Pou most of the time used a white Toyota Hilux SW4, and was escorted by one or more presidential security cars.
Uzbekistan	President Shavkat Mirziyoyev	armored Mercedes-Maybach W222 S600 Pullman				A Togg T10X was also gifted by the Turkish president.
Vanuatu	president of Vanuatu Nikenike Vurobaravu	Toyota Land Cruiser J200	Toyota Land Cruiser Prado			
Vatican City	Pope Leo XIV	Popemobile		SCV 1 (Popemobile) armoured Mercedes-Benz S-Class, custom-made Lancia Thesis, custom-made electric Renault Kangoo (daily use)	A Mercedes-Benz M-Class Popemobile designed to create greater visibility of the Pope during public appearances Lancia Giubileo used by Pope Benedict XVI during his visit to the Quirinal Palace in 2008	
Venezuela	Former President Nicolas Maduro	black Toyota 4Runner or a Ford Explorer or a Toyota Fortuner				Former president Hugo Chávez sometimes drove a red IKCO Samand badged Centauro, or in red or green a Tiuna truck accompanied with some ministers or governors or mayors, depending on the occasion when he travelled.
Venezuela	Vice president Delcy Rodríguez	armored Nissan Patrol	SUVs			
Vietnam	Visiting head of state in official state visit to Vietnam	Mercedes-Benz S 600 "Pullman Guard", unless the visiting head of state uses their own vehicles	Public Security or Police motorbikes, bulletproof Toyota Land Cruiser, Toyota Camry, Chevrolet Suburban, Mercedes-Benz S-Class and Ford Transit.	State-owned licence plate "80A-800.01" and "80A-800.02"		In September 2026, King of Thailand Vajiralongkorn was observed to ride in a VinFast Lạc Hồng 900 LX with the state-owned licence plate "80A-106.66" during a state visit to Vietnam
Vietnam	General Secretary of the Communist Party and President of Vietnam Tô Lâm	VinFast Lạc Hồng 900 LX	Public Security or Police motorbikes, bulletproof Toyota Land Cruiser, Toyota Camry, Chevrolet Suburban, Mercedes-Benz S-Class and Ford Transit.	State-owned licence plate starting with "80A" or "80B"		Former General Secretary of the Vietnamese Communist Party Nguyễn Phú Trọng used to ride in a 1998 Toyota Crown that was brought to his state funeral in July 2024 in Hanoi
Vietnam	Prime Minister Lê Minh Hưng	Toyota Land Cruiser (200 and 300 series)	Bulletproof Toyota Land Cruiser and Toyota Camry	State-owned licence plate starting with "80A" or "80B"		Former Prime Minister Phạm Minh Chính was observed to usually ride in a Toyota Land Cruiser 200 with the licence plate "80A-696.69"
Vietnam	Other government officials (up to Ministerial officials)	Toyota Land Cruiser, Toyota Camry, Toyota Fortuner, Chevrolet Suburban and VinFast LUX A2.0	Bulletproof Toyota Land Cruiser and Toyota Camry for Ministerial officials only. Sometimes local or provincial police participates in the motorcade instead.	State-owned licence plate		A convertible VinFast VF9 is used by the Chief of Parade (typically Deputy Chief of General Staff of People's Army of Vietnam) during military parade
Yemen	Chairman of the Presidential Leadership Council Rashad al-Alimi	Dartz Prombron	Toyota Land Cruiser Prados			
Yugoslavia	President Josip Broz Tito	custom-built Mercedes-Benz 600 limousine				
Zambia	president of Zambia Hakainde Hichilema	armoured Mercedes-Benz W222 S600 Pullman limousine or a Lexus LX570 and an armoured Toyota Land Cruiser J200 (used in rural travels)	BMW motorcycles and BMW 3 Series E93			
Zimbabwe	president of Zimbabwe Emmerson Mnangagwa	Mercedes-Benz GLE-Class Mercedes-Benz S-Class and a 1952 Rolls-Royce Silver Wraith (ceremonial use)	Mercedes-Benz C-Class			

== See also ==
- Air transports of heads of state and government
- Royal barge
- Royal train
- Royal yacht
- Royal Mews § Royal and state carriages
- State coach
