= Presidential car (France) =

Vehicle which carries the president of France

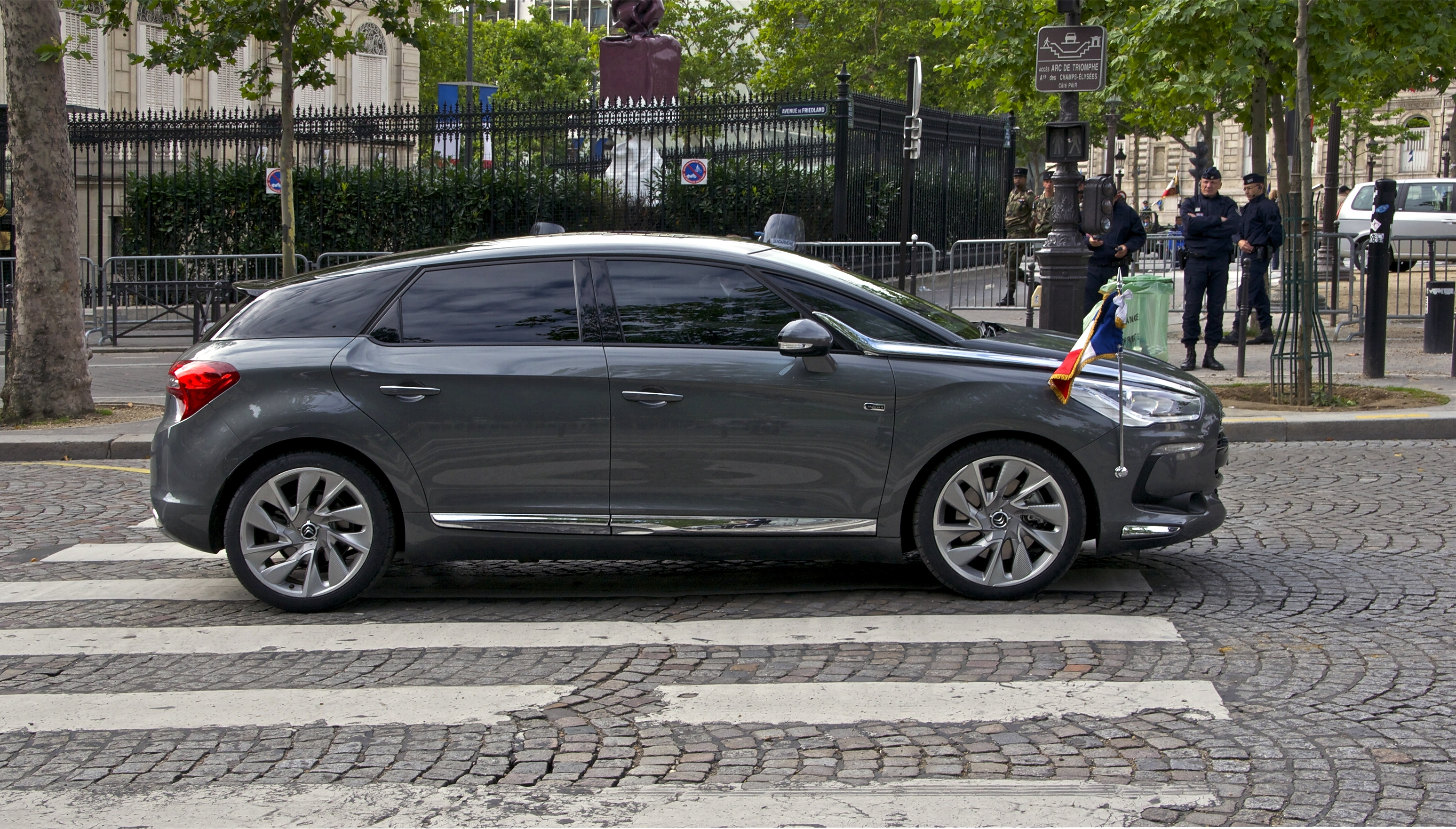
The Citroën DS5 used by François Hollande as his presidential state vehicle, in July 2012

The presidential car is the vehicle which carries the president of France.

The president of France can choose between several armoured versions of high-end French cars, which are traditionally provided by the manufacturers (such as Citroën, DS, Peugeot or Renault) and different presidents will have their own preference.

Current president Emmanuel Macron has used a Renault Rafale and DS 7 Crossback as the first luxury SUV by French manufacturer DS Automobiles for his investiture. For his day to day travel, Macron uses an armoured Peugeot 5008 and a Renault Espace. He has also used the ACMAT military command car for the Bastille Day parade.

President François Hollande used a one-off convertible version of the Citroën DS5 Hybrid4 for his inauguration parade on 15 May 2012. The car, owned by Citroën, has since been displayed at various events throughout the world. But For his day to day travel, Hollande was usually chauffeured in an armoured Citroën C6, in his term although he has been known to make private trips by moped.

For his inauguration parade in 2007, Nicolas Sarkozy used the one-off Peugeot 607 Paladine model, a stretched limousine with landaulette body, originally built as a concept car in 2000. The model was brought out of storage for the occasion and updated with a new grille and lights to bring it in line with the 2004 re-style of the mainstream model. It was returned to Peugeot and, as it effectively remained a concept car in its fit and finish, did not become part of the Élysée fleet.

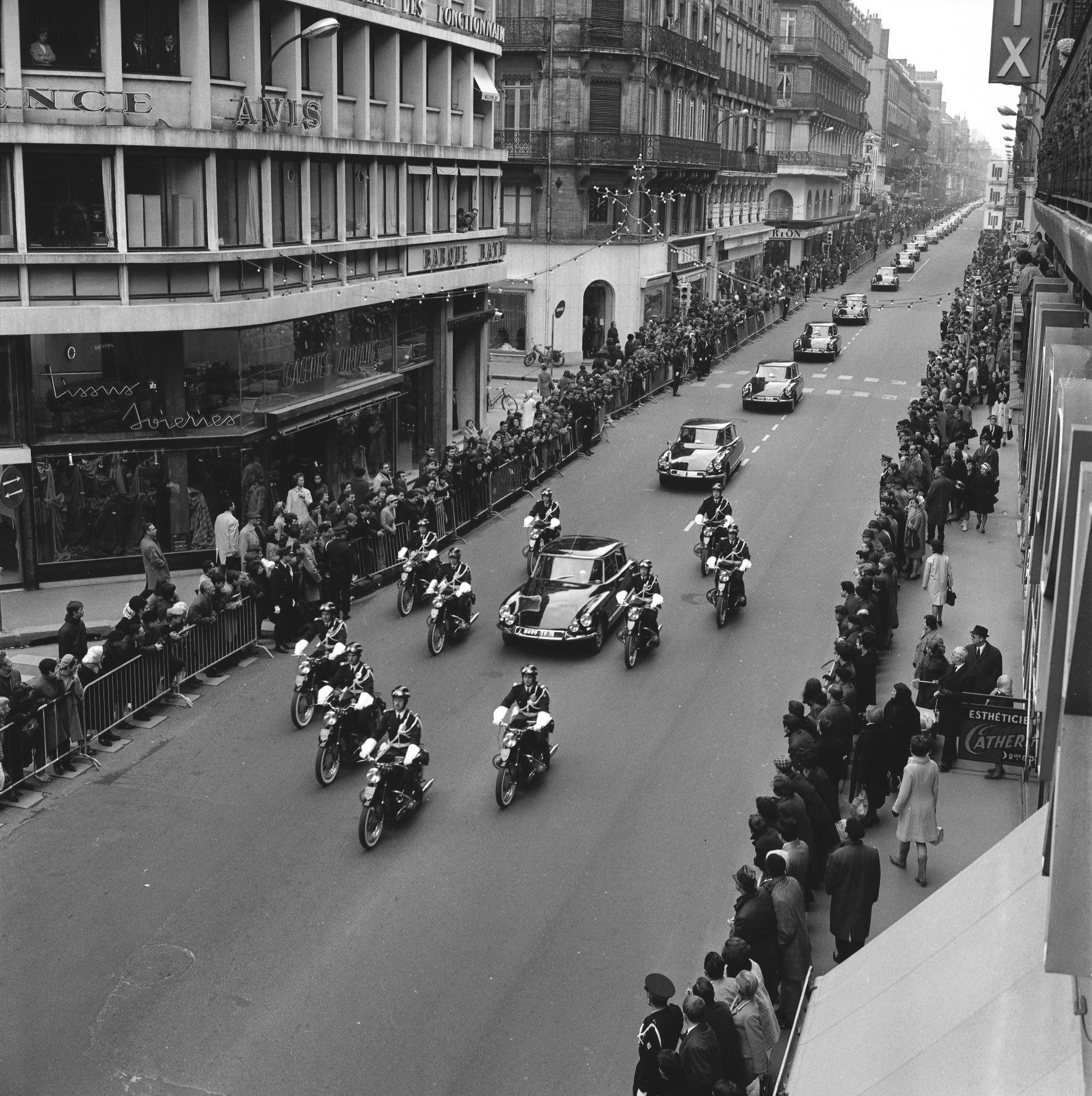
The Citroën DS, was commonly associated with de Gaulle during his presidency.

Valéry Giscard d'Estaing used a Peugeot 604 throughout his term, while Jacques Chirac preferred Citroën (CX Prestige and C6) and François Mitterrand was a Renault fan, occasionally using his own Renault 5 model and the presidential Renault 30 and Safrane, also a Peugeot 605.

The most famous association between a president of France and a single model was that of Charles de Gaulle with the Citroën DS, as portrayed in the film, The Day of the Jackal. The president was saved in two assassination attempts by OAS sympathisers by the car's unique ability to drive on three wheels and to keep running when more than one tyre is punctured.

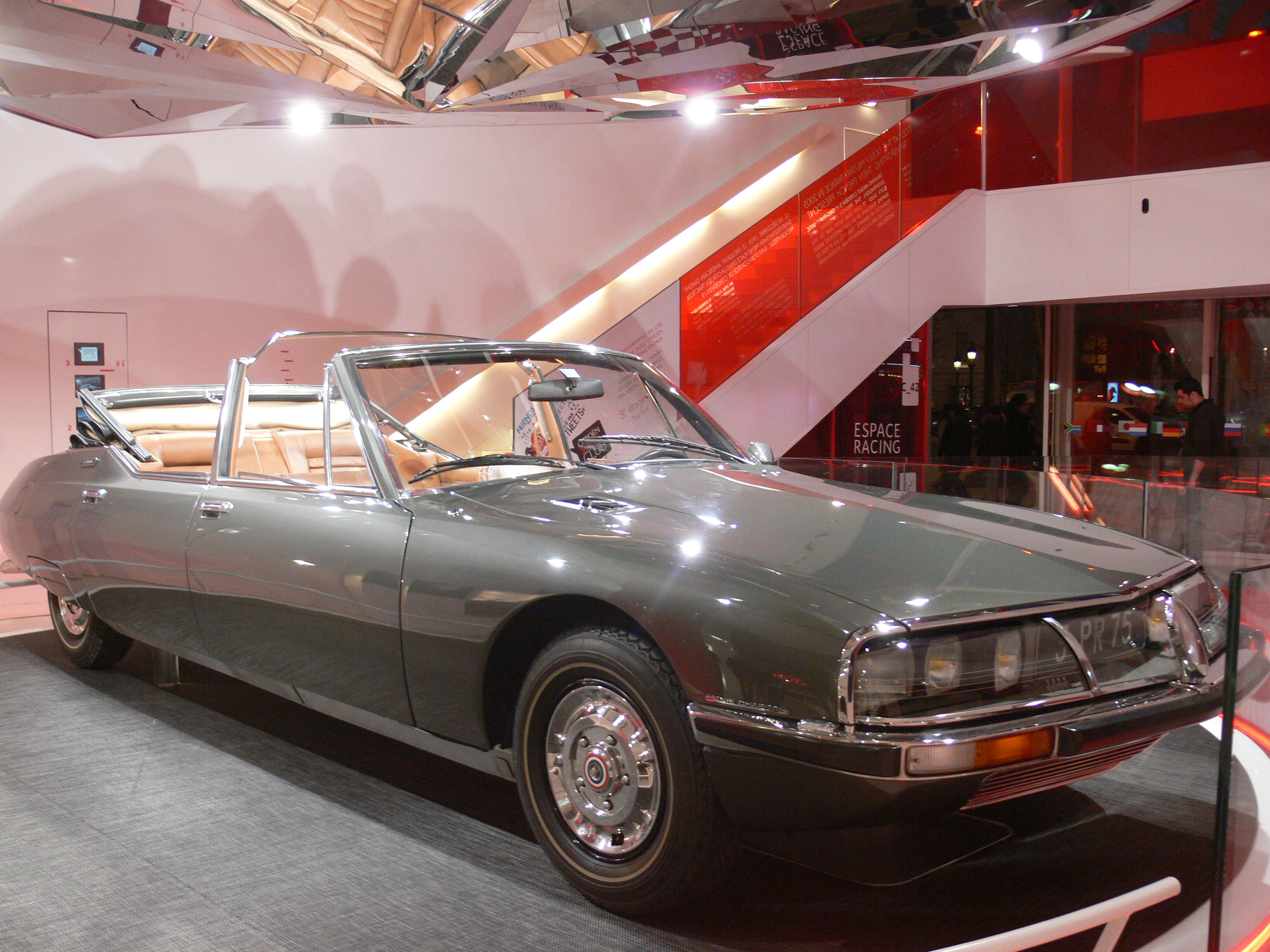
Two custom made Citroën SMs have been built and maintained by Élysée Palace

For ceremonial occasions, the president also has access to two special open top Citroën SM Présidentielle models, created for President Georges Pompidou by the coach-builder Henri Chapron. Based on the SM Opera, itself a special edition four-door coupé, these cars are still used for state occasions and military parades, when the open-top layout enables the president to stand in the back seat and survey the crowd. Built for an official visit by Queen Elizabeth II in 1972, the cars have a standard mechanical layout with the addition of a special gear for low-speed cruising.

One of these cars was also used by President François Mitterrand for the official opening of the Channel Tunnel in 1994, when it accompanied the Rolls-Royce Phantom VI of Queen Elizabeth II. Number plates on these cars are standard French ones, although specially created for the model (2 PR 75 and 3 PR 75, '75' denoting the Paris region). Both are still maintained in working order, but are now rarely seen in use.

== See also ==
- Official state car
