= Presidential car (Chile) =

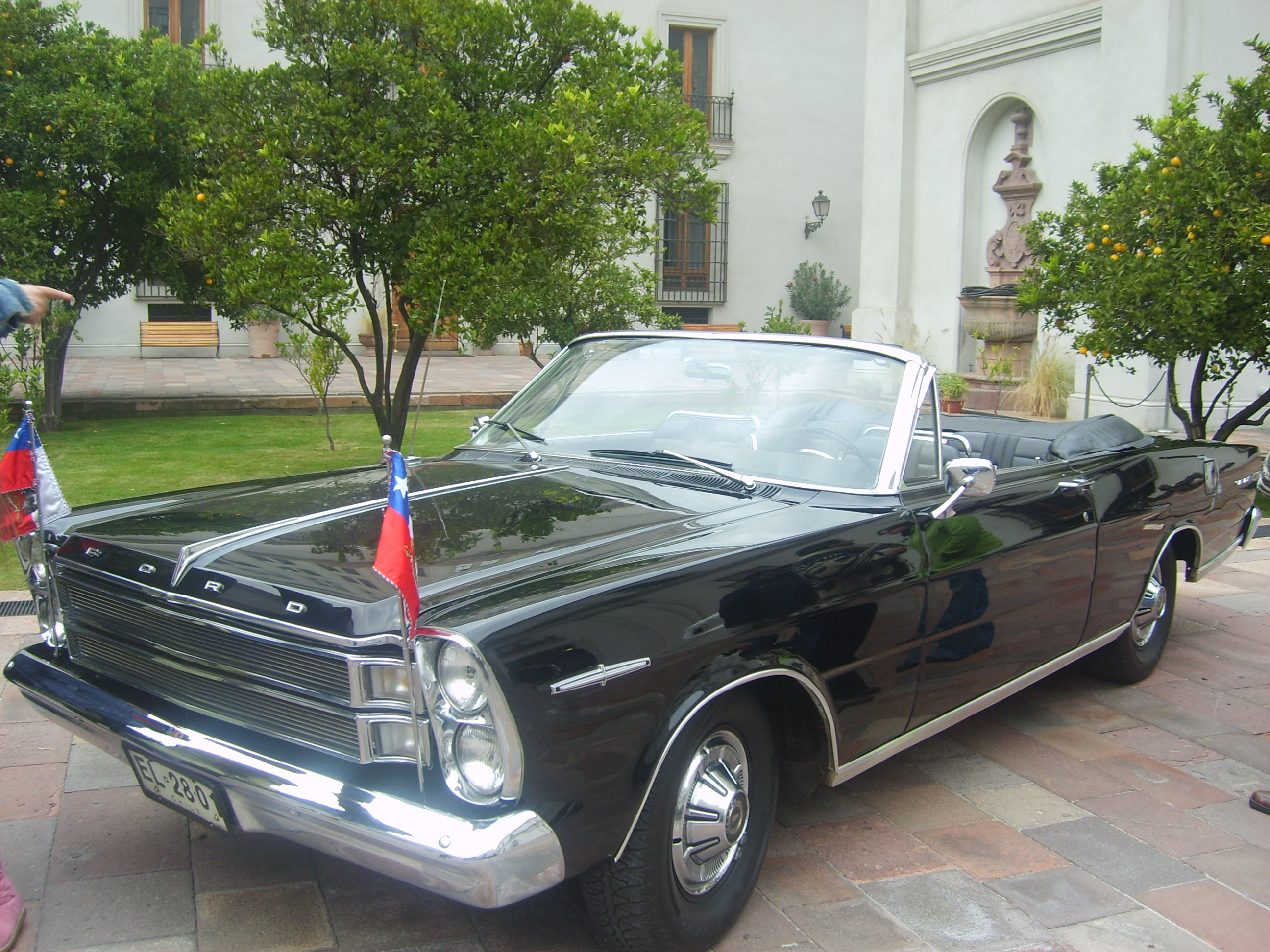
The Ford Galaxie has been Chile's ceremonial presidential car since 1970

The Chilean presidential car refers to the vehicles maintained and provided by the Chilean government for the president of Chile, as a symbol of the office in a ceremonial setting, and for the President's day-to-day transportation needs.

Hyundai has been a favored brand for the Chilean government since the signing of a free trade agreement in 2003, overtaking Chevrolet as the best-selling auto brand in Chile in 2017.

== History ==
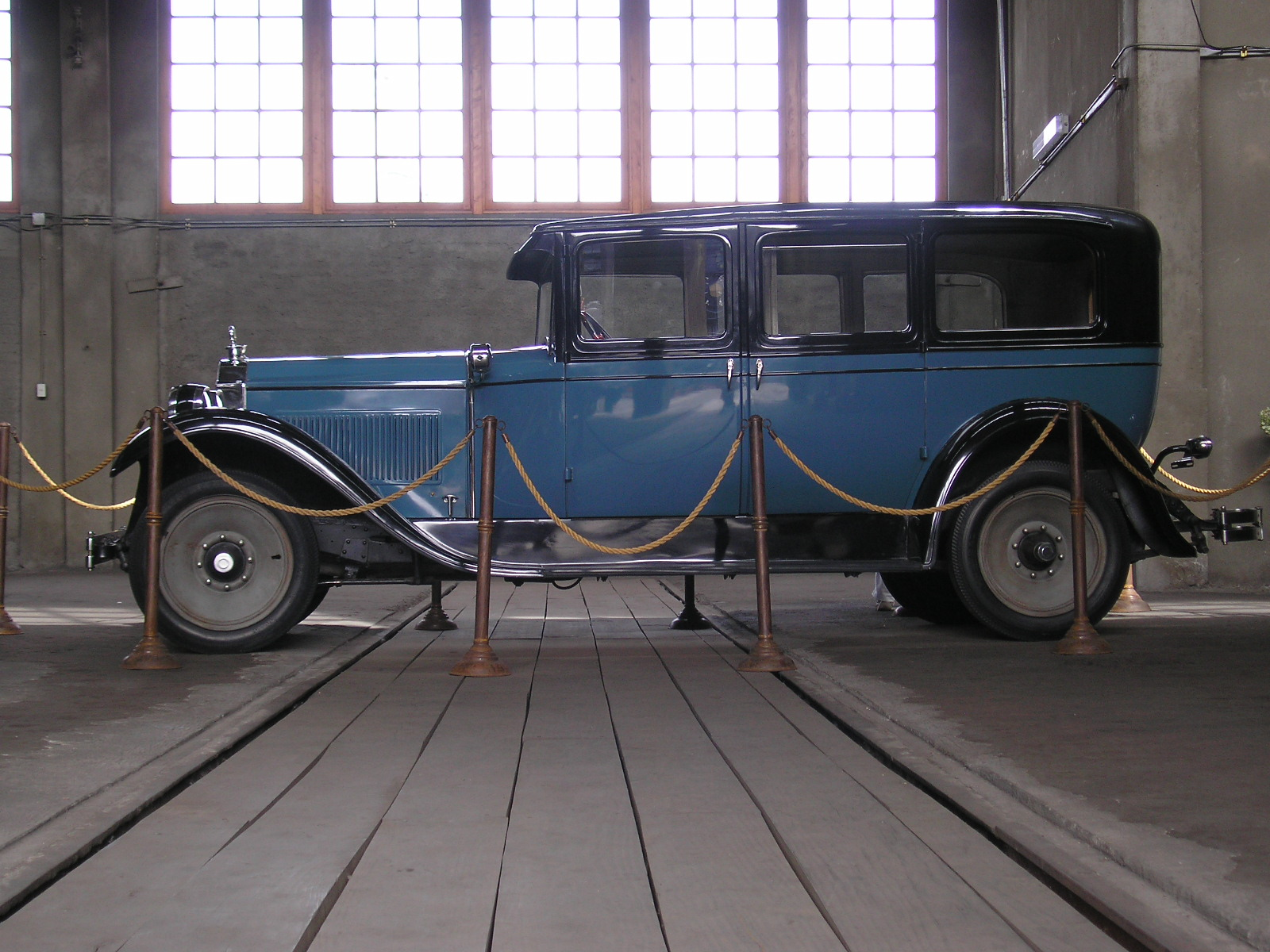
del Campo's Packard Six at El Museo Ferroviario Pablo Neruda

Chilean presidents travelled primarily by horseback until José Manuel Balmaceda imported a luxurious horse drawn "Bandeja" carriage from France to be used for public events and ceremonies.

Carlos Ibanez del Campo would be the first president with an automobile, a 1928 Packard Six. This Packard was later modified to be able to use the railroad between Santiago and southern cities not yet connected by automobile roadways. After being transferred for use by the state railways, it would later be donated by then President Lagos to the Pablo Neruda National Railway Museum in Temuco upon its opening in 2004.

== Ceremonial use ==
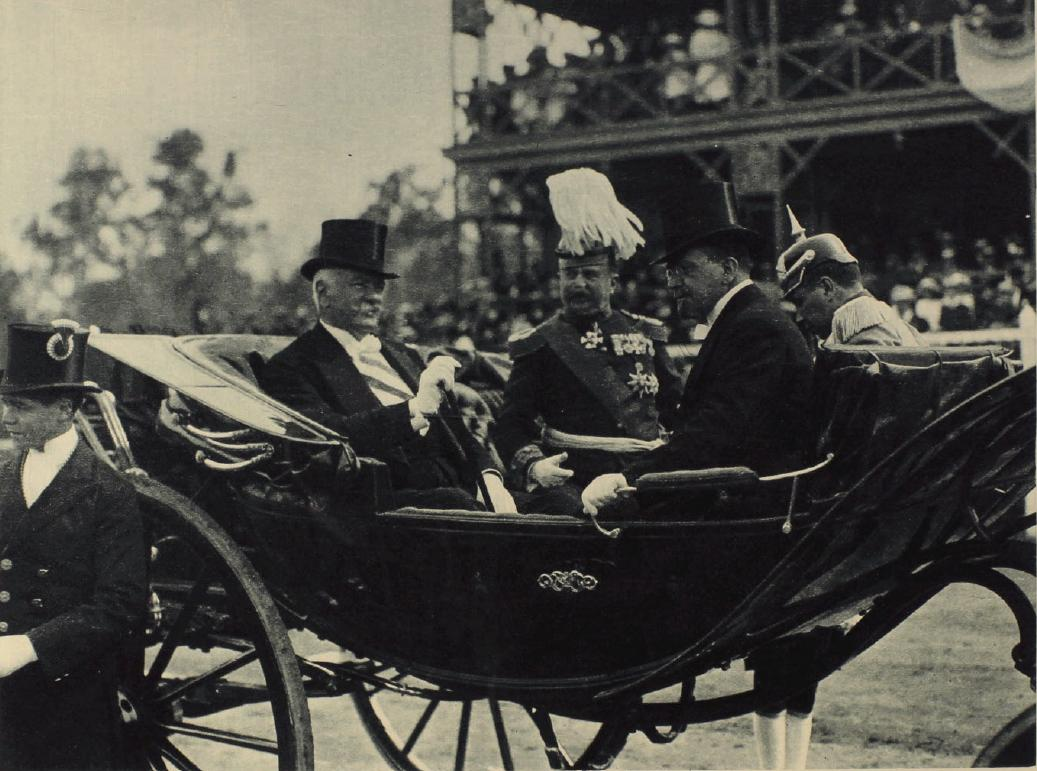
Juan Luis Sanfuentes arriving at the Dia de las Glorias del Ejercito in 1916

The Balmaceda carriage continued to be used as a symbol of office, transporting the president for inaugurations and other ceremonial events until 1970 when president Salvador Allende used a 1966 Ford Galaxie XL for his inauguration.

In 1968, Queen Elizabeth II made a state visit to Chile in which she and then president, Eduardo Frei Montalva, travelled together in the Galaxie, reportedly donated by either Ford Brasil or the Queen herself, and was customised with her royal arms on the steering wheel.

The 1966 model Ford Galaxie began production in Brazil for South America in 1967 so it is plausible they would donate a vehicle knowing the promotional value its use would receive, and in fact provided other vehicles in Brazil for the queen's visit there prior to her visiting Chile, although the unlikely story of a British monarch giving Chile a car built in Brazil by an American manufacturer has become an enduring myth.

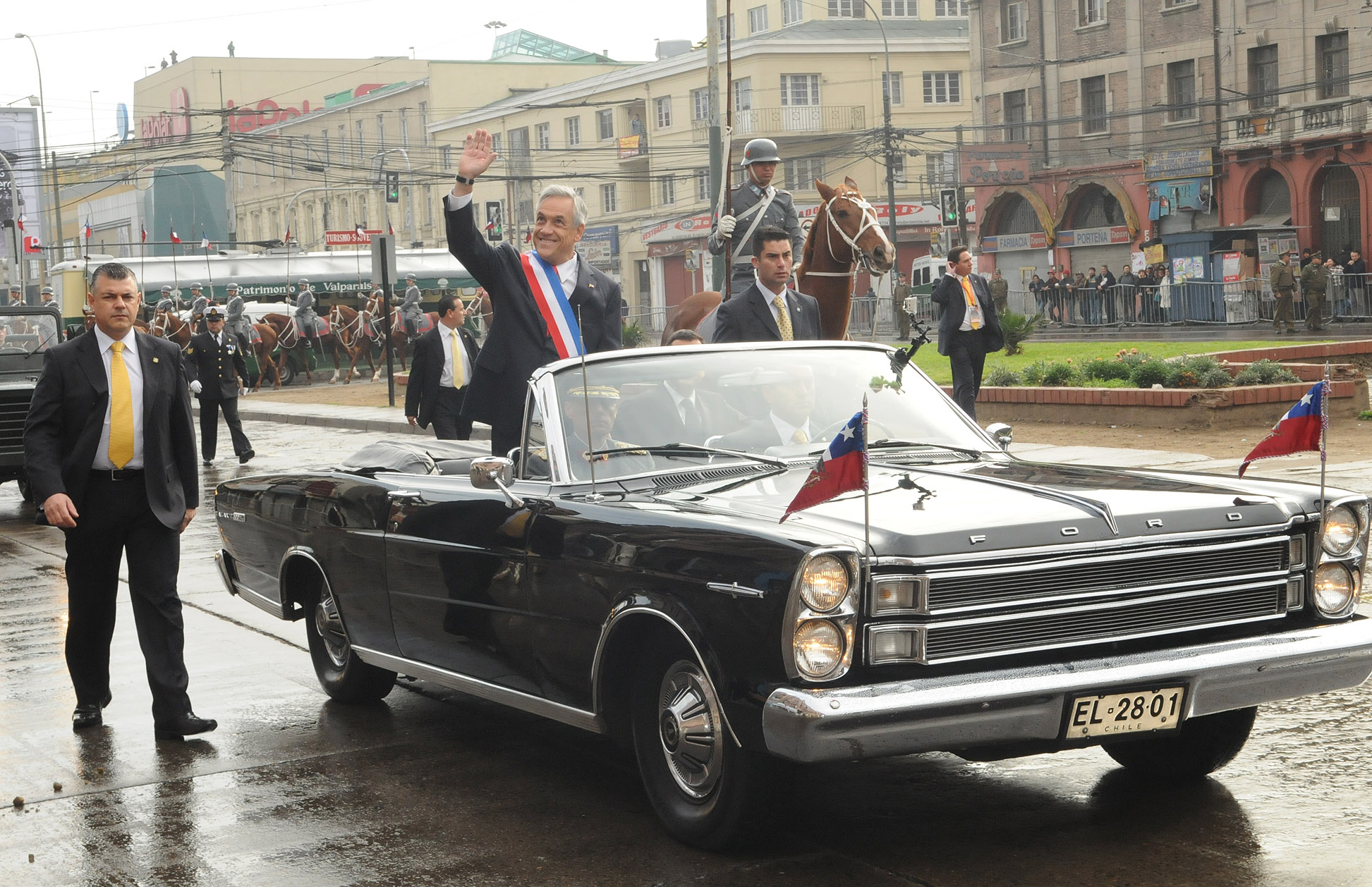
Sebastián Piñera on Navy Day in 2011

Montalva's successor, socialist Allende, not wanting to convey the image of royalty that carriages now confer, decided the more plebeian Ford better fit his image and used it for his inauguration, adopting the vehicle as his official vehicle, with a normally issued license plate (EL-2801). The Galaxie has since transported dignitaries such as Fidel Castro, Indira Gandhi and Pablo Neruda. Gabriel Boric was the first president officially driven in the Galaxie by a female driver during his inauguration.

Both the carriage and the Galaxie have been maintained by the state and are now used only for official ceremonies, such as presidential inaugurations, state visits, and the national holidays on 21 May and 19 September.

== Daily use ==
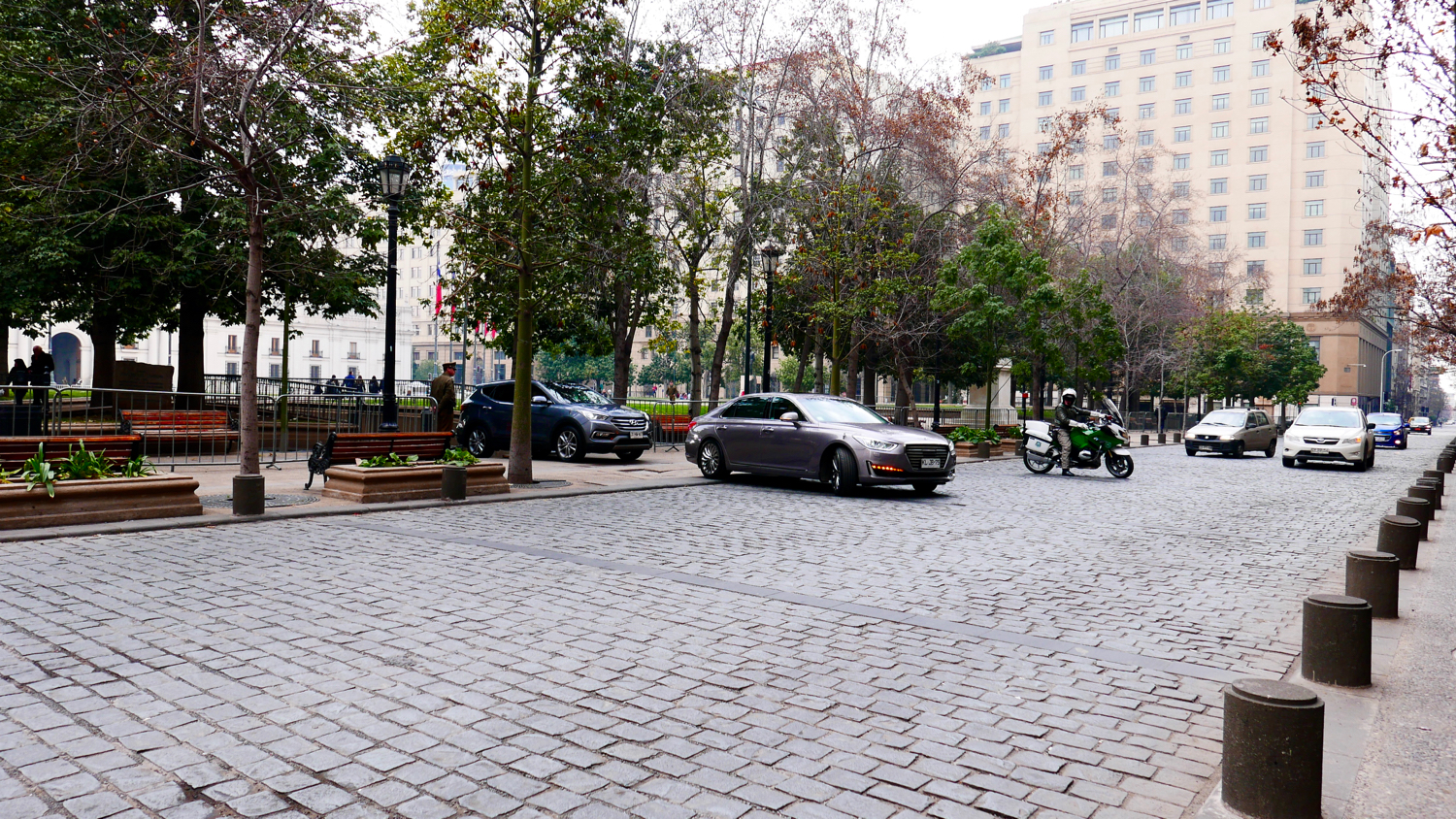
Piñera departs from La Moneda Palace in a Genesis G90

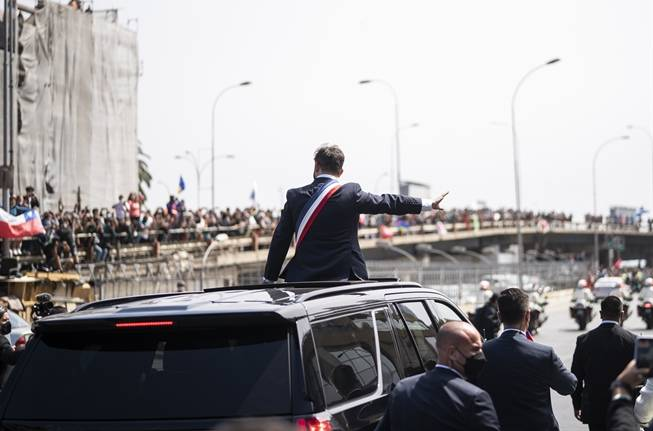
Boric waves to Chileanos from the sunroof of a Tahoe

President Augusto Pinochet travelled in a convoy of armoured W126 Mercedes-Benz S Class, which would save his life during an assassination attempt in 1986.

President Patricio Aylwin abandoned Mercedes for the more democratic Renault 21, Eduardo Frei Ruiz-Tagle used a Lincoln Town Car, and Ricardo Lagos, a Peugeot 406. President Michelle Bachelet continued with a Peugeot 607 in her first term in office.

Presidential staff of this era also used Audi A4 and A6s. Various Toyota Land Cruisers and Dodge Durangos also composed the presidential motorcade.

During his first term, Sebastián Piñera was the first to switch to an Asian manufacturer, recognizing their increasing market share in Chile, choosing a Lexus LS 600h as his daily transport. Bachelet introduced the use of a Hyundai Equus in 2014 for her second term, a marque that has continued into Piñera's second term in 2018 with his choice of the Genesis G90.

In 2021, the Carabineros, charged with protecting the president, acquired 4 armoured Chevrolet Tahoe Z71s as escort vehicles, which have also been used to drive Gabriel Boric himself. La Moneda staff also have access to a fleet of Hyundai Santa Fe and Hyundai Sonata vehicles they can use to accompany the president.

== See also ==
- Automóvil presidencial (Spanish)
- President of Chile
- Official state car
