= Presidential state car (Argentina) =

The presidential car carries the head of state of Argentina. It is Argentina's version of Cadillac One.

== History ==
Juan Perón bought several Cadillacs, and a 1972 Ford Fairlane armored model, which years later made headlines when it was abandoned. Perón used a Cabriolet. A Falcon Cabriolet for the presidency of Arturo Illia, and a Rambler Ambassador to the chairs of Juan Carlos Onganía, Perón, and Isabel Perón. The vehicles had armor items were elongated 30 cm. Currently it is an Audi A8, this means of transport like the Tango 01 are a symbol of the presidency.

In 1952, during the visit of President Dwight Eisenhower, General Motors gave him a Cadillac convertible to be used in all ceremonies of inauguration, continuing to Néstor Kirchner. The vehicle is equipped with power windows, leather upholstery and a telephone. Raúl Alfonsín used a Renault 25. The car was spacious and had a computer that interacts with the driver in Spanish (a kind of GPS for the 1980s). It reported the amount of fuel in the tank and the opening of doors, among other data. Cristina Fernández de Kirchner used models of the Volkswagen Group (Audi A6 (mostly), a Volkswagen Passat CC, and a Volkswagen Vento (Volkswagen Bora/Jetta IV)). All of them are armored and are matte black.

== See also ==
- Official state car
