= Royal transport in Thailand =

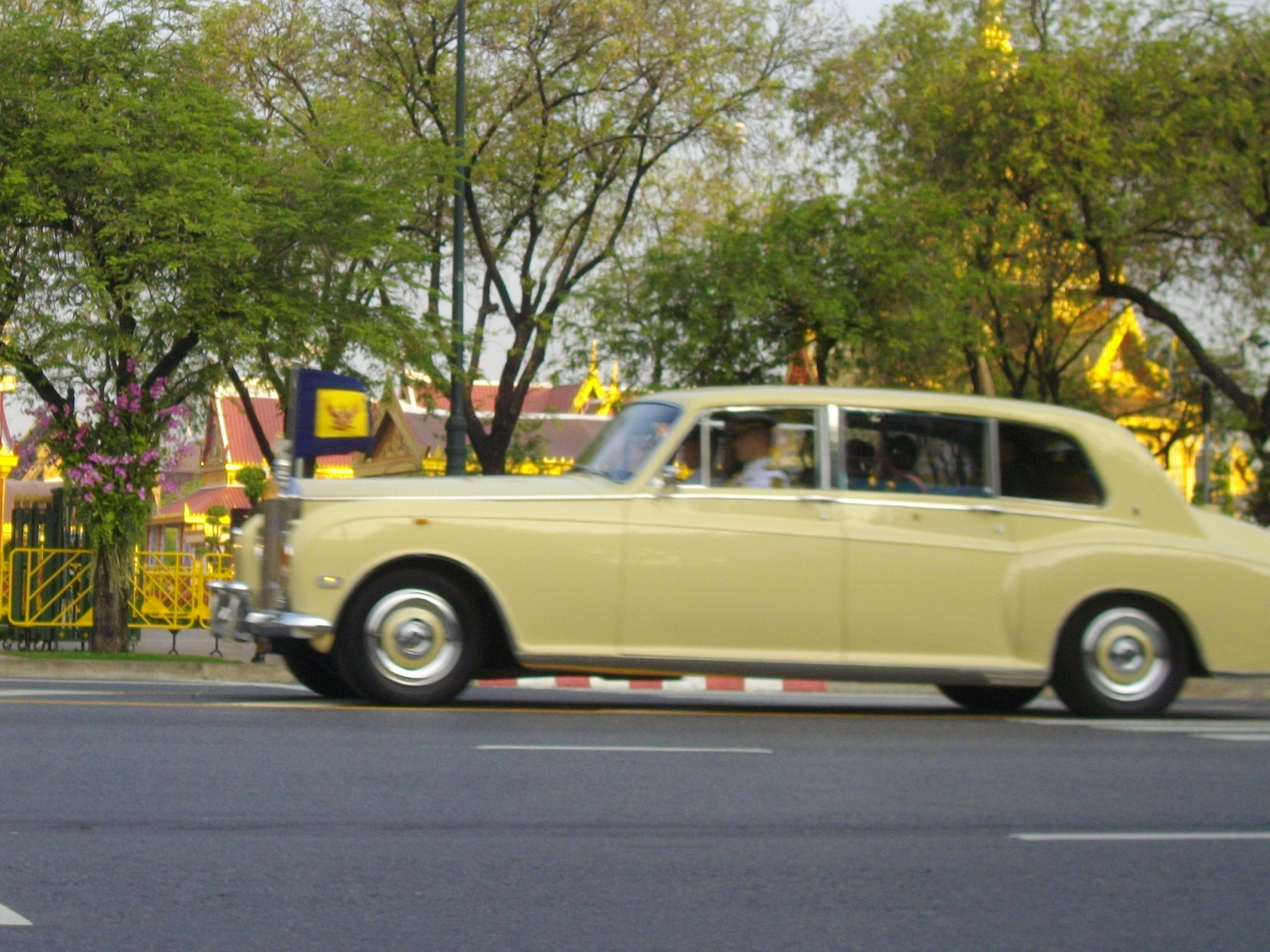
A Rolls-Royce Phantom VI carrying Vajiralongkorn to an event in 2012

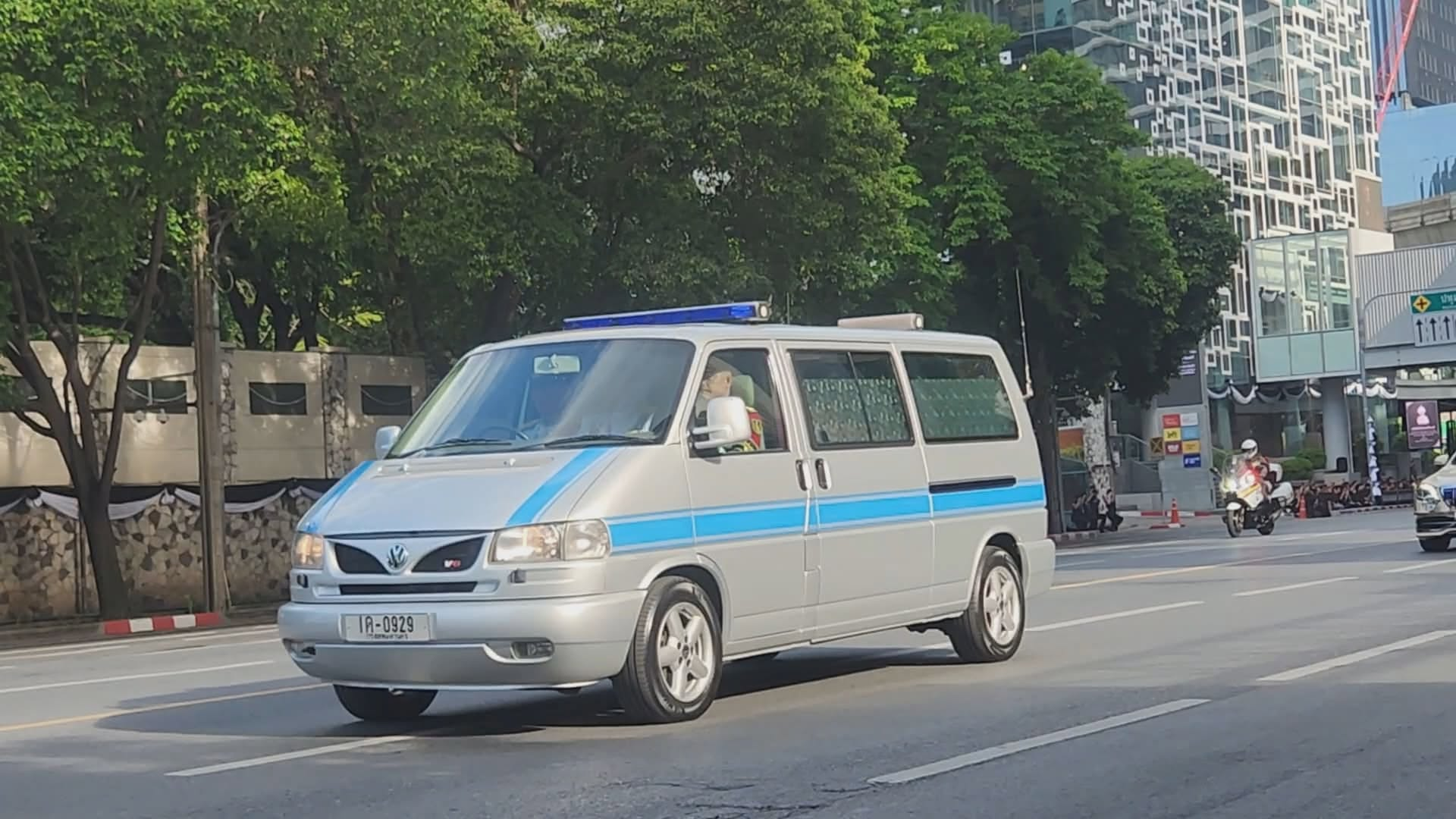
A gray 2001 Volkswagen Caravelle T4, registration number 1D-0929 Bangkok, carried the coffin of Bajrakitiyabha from King Chulalongkorn Memorial Hospital to the Grand Palace in 2026, June 13. This car was previously carried the coffin of Bhumibol Adulyadej in 2016 and Sirikit in 2025.

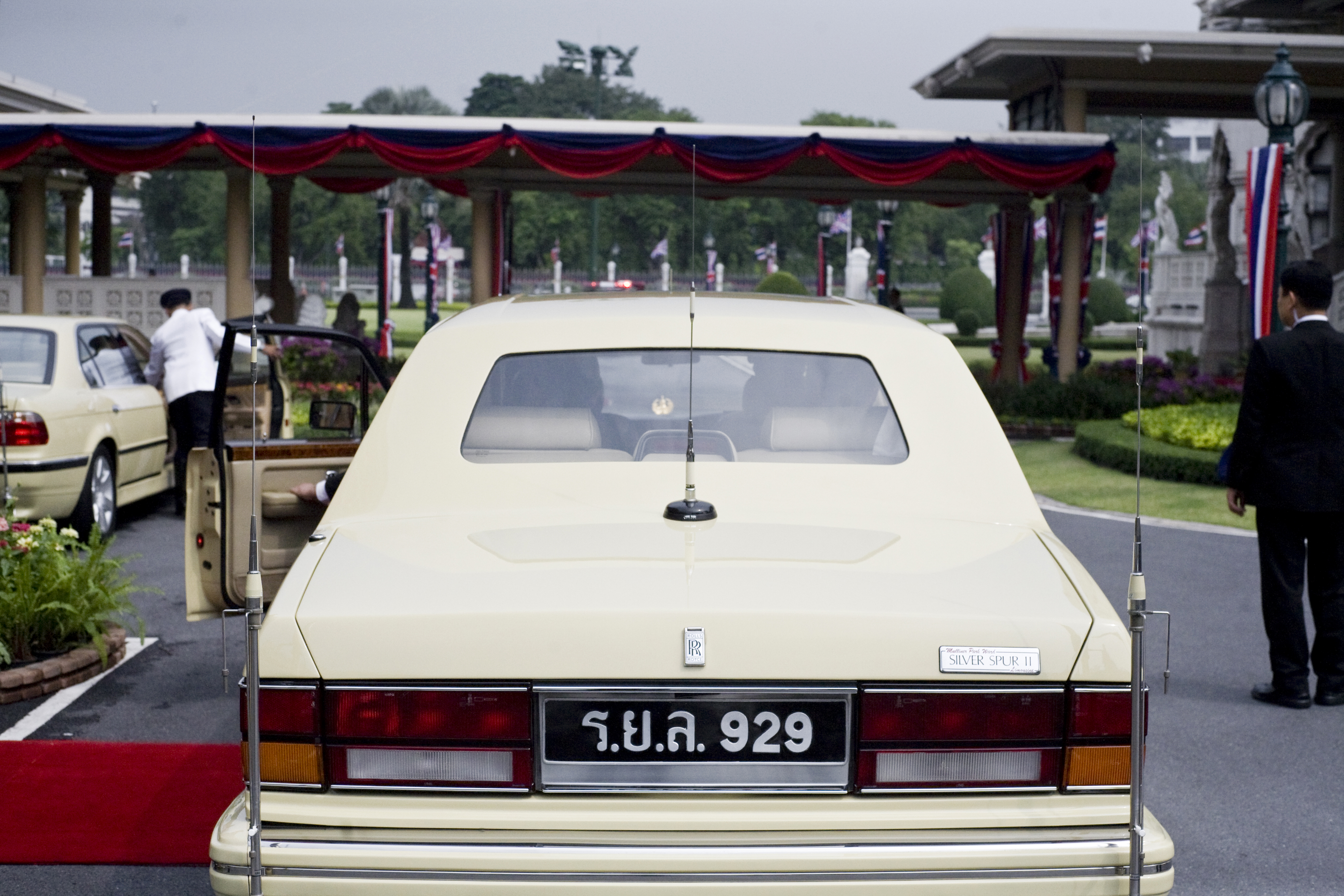
Rear view of a Rolls-Royce Silver Spur II Touring Limousine in 2009

Royal transport in Thailand have included a variety of vehicles generally used for royal tours and official and ceremonial duties.

During his time as king, Bhumibol Adulyadej traveled in a Maybach 62 with special number plates, police motorcycle outriders, and an escort of Mercedes-Benz S-Class police cars. He also used other vehicles, including the following models – Rolls-Royce Phantom VI, Rolls-Royce Silver Spur stretch limousine, Rolls-Royce Silver Spur Park Ward, Lexus LS460L, BMW 760Li (E38 and E66), BMW 5 Series (E60), Cadillac DTS stretch limousine , Volkswagen Caravelle T5 TDi , and Mercedes E55 AMG (W211).

All of the royal cars are ivory colored. On important occasions their cars are accompanied by a motorcade of ruby-red vehicles, comprising Mercedes S-class, E-class, BMW series 7, series 5, Honda Accord, Nissan Cefiro and Teana. Lesser occasions use a smaller motorcade in ivory, including the 7 series, 5 series, S-class, E-class and Nissan Teana. Sirikit, the queen mother,used to travel in a Cadillac DTS stretch limousine or a modified Volkswagen Caravelle T4 TDi.

King Vajiralongkorn and Queen Suthida usually use Rolls-Royce cars. These vehicles were formerly the previous king's official cars. The Rolls-Royce fleet includes a Rolls-Royce Phantom V, Rolls-Royce Phantom VI, and Rolls-Royce Silver Spur stretch limousine. They also travel by Maybach 62, Mercedes-Maybach S650 Pullman Guard (W222), Mercedes-Maybach S650 (W222), Mercedes-Maybach S680 (W223) or Bentley Mulsanne Grand Limousine.

Princess Maha Chakri Sirindhorn usually travels by Lexus LS600hL or Mercedes-Benz S500 (W221 or W222). For unofficial royal journeys, she uses a modified Mercedes-Benz V-Class.

Other members of the royal family mostly use ivory-colored Mercedes-Benz S500 (W221 and W222) cars for official journeys, with Mercedes-Benz S-Class (W222) police escorts.

Princess Bajrakitiyabha used to drive herself in a red Mini Cooper S or a lime-green Volkswagen New Beetle.

There are also royal cars with a convertible top for royal ceremonies, such as a Rolls-Royce Corniche and a Cadillac DTS (the hard top was transformed into a convertible top).

The Bureau of the Royal Household also has its own vehicles. These cars are mostly Nissan Teana and Mercedes-Benz S-Class (W221 and W222). These cars are painted in ivory.

The royal department has several types of cars, including Toyota Corolla Altis 1.6 G, Toyota Camry Hybrid, Toyota Hilux Revo, Nissan Navara, Toyota Fortuner, Isuzu MU-X, Toyota Coaster and Toyota Commuter. They are mostly painted silver or white, with the registration plates in yellow with the text "ส.น.ว.xxxx" in green.
