= Star Insignia of Army officer vehicles (Sri Lanka) =

Star Insignia of Army officer vehicles differ from each other starting from one star up until five stars. The first four stars should be granted to an officer in active duty while the fifth Star insignia can be wore by a retired officer. The only retired officer who is permitted to wear the five star insignia in Sri Lanka is Field Marshal Sarath Fonseka.

== One Star ==
Brigadier is a senior rank in the Sri Lanka Army. The rank has a NATO rank code of OF-6, equivalent to Commodore in the Sri Lanka Navy and Air Commodore in the Sri Lanka Air Force. Initially Brigadier was not considered to be a General Officer rank by the Sri Lanka Army, however since the 1980s the rank had limited recognition as a General Officer rank, having their staff car designated with a single star, they got major generals' appointments though now Sri Lanka Army's brigadiers are not classed as generals.

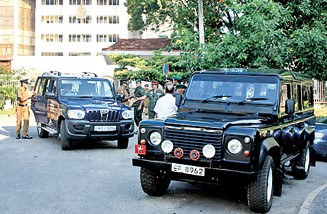
Sri Lanka Army Land Rover Defender with single star

== Two Stars ==
Major-general is the second-highest active rank of the Sri Lanka Army. The rank has a NATO rank code of OF-7, equivalent to a rear-admiral in the Sri Lanka Navy or an air vice-marshal in the Sri Lanka Air Force or the air forces of many Commonwealth countries. Appoints at this level carries the officer staff car designated with Two stars.

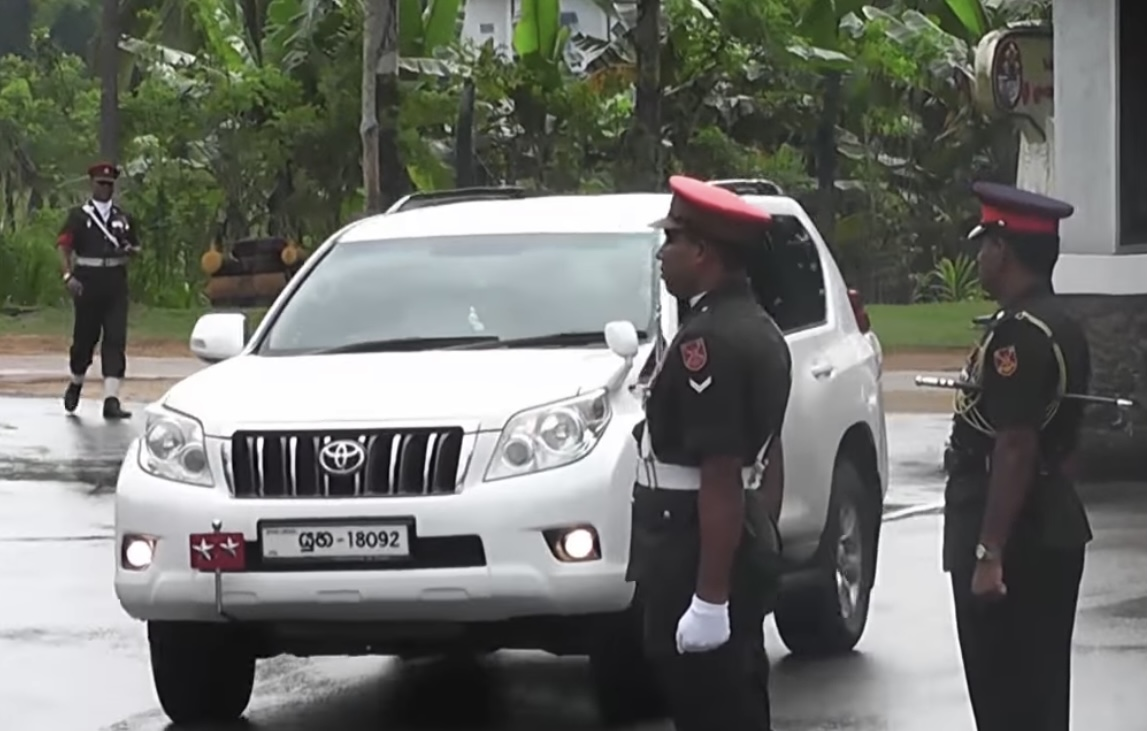
Sri Lanka Army Toyota Land Cruiser Prado with Two stars

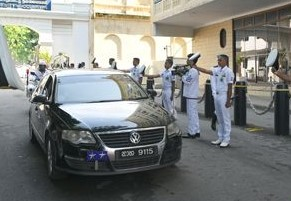
Sri Lanka Navy Volkswagen Passat Sedan with Two stars

== Three Stars ==
The rank of Lieutenant-general is held by the Commander of the Army. The rank has a NATO rank code of OF-8, equivalent to a vice-admiral in the Sri Lanka Navy and an air marshal in the Sri Lanka Air Force (SLAF) and the air forces of many Commonwealth countries. Every Army commanders' staff car is designated with Three stars.

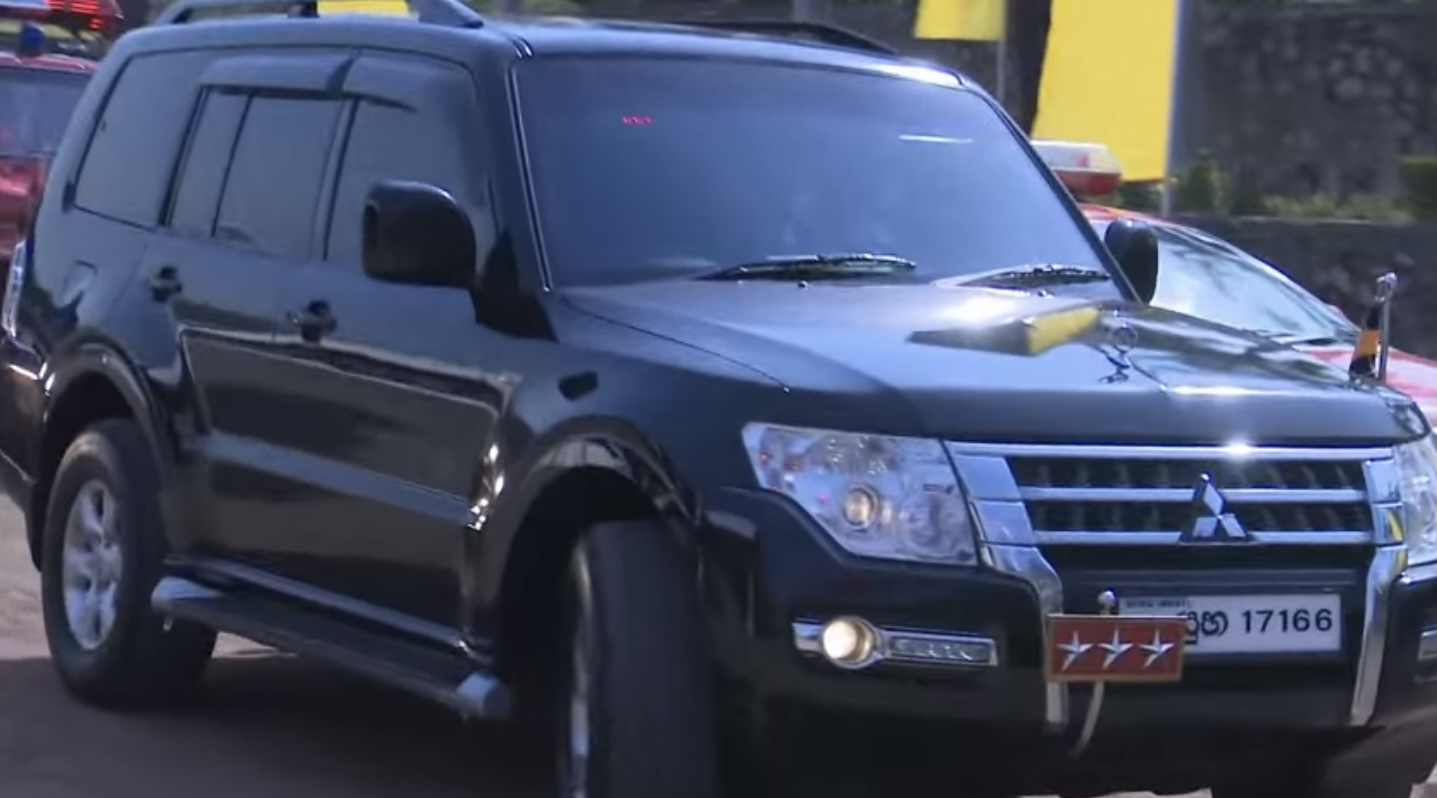
Sri Lanka Army Mitsubishi Montero with Three stars

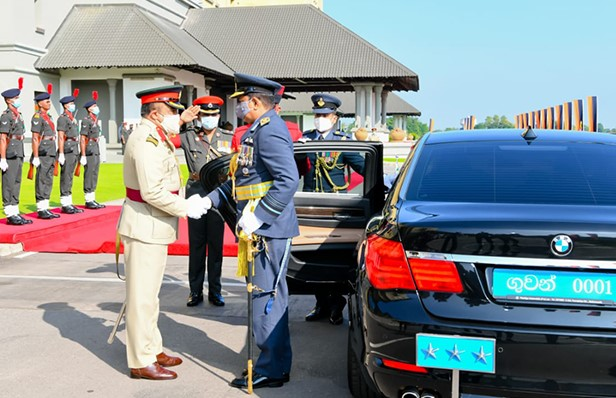
Sri Lanka Air Force BMW 5 Series (F10) with Three stars

== Four Stars ==
The rank of General is held by a Chief of the Defence Staff (if the chief is appointed from the army and not from the navy or the air force) or is mostly awarded as a ceremonial rank to the Commander of the Army on his day of retirement. General is the equivalent of Admiral in the Sri Lanka Navy and Air Chief Marshal in the Sri Lanka Air Force. Every Generals' staff car is designated with Four stars.

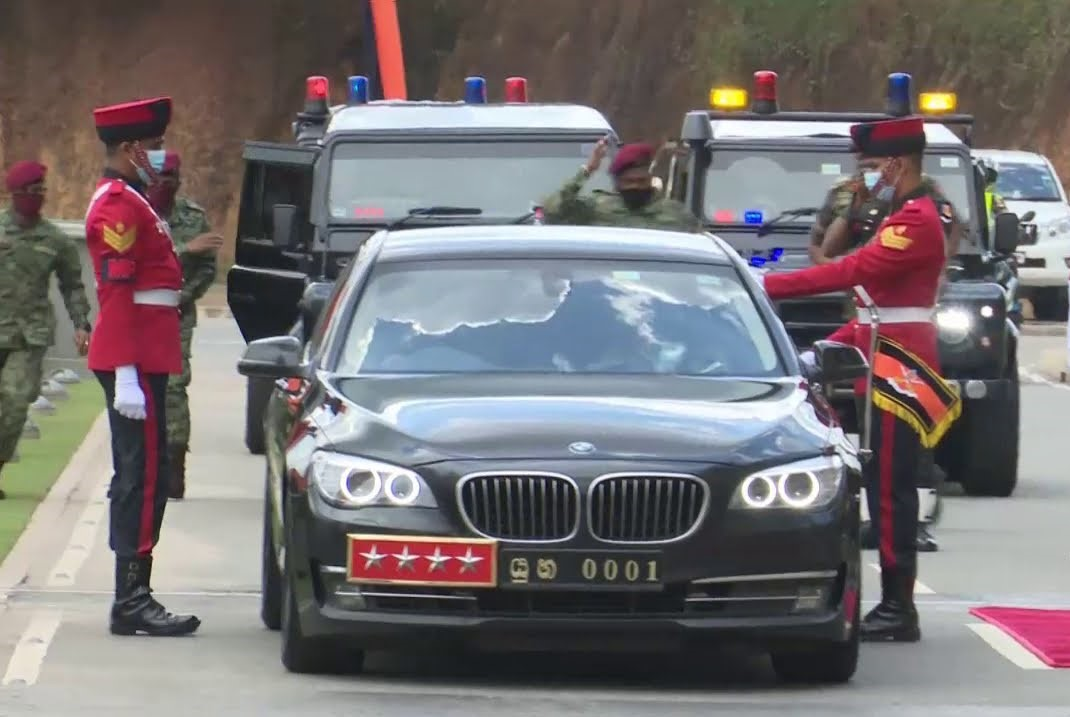
Sri Lanka Army BMW 7 Series (F01) with Four stars

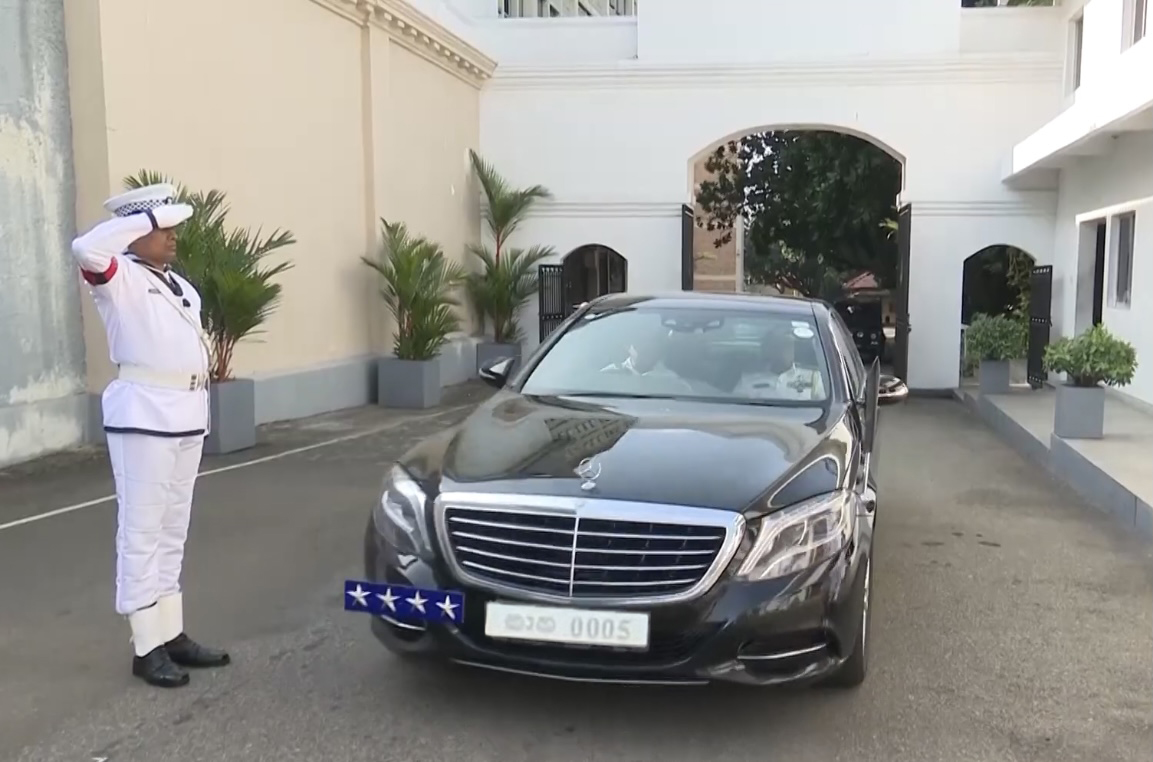
Sri Lanka Navy Mercedes-Benz S-Class (W222) with Four stars

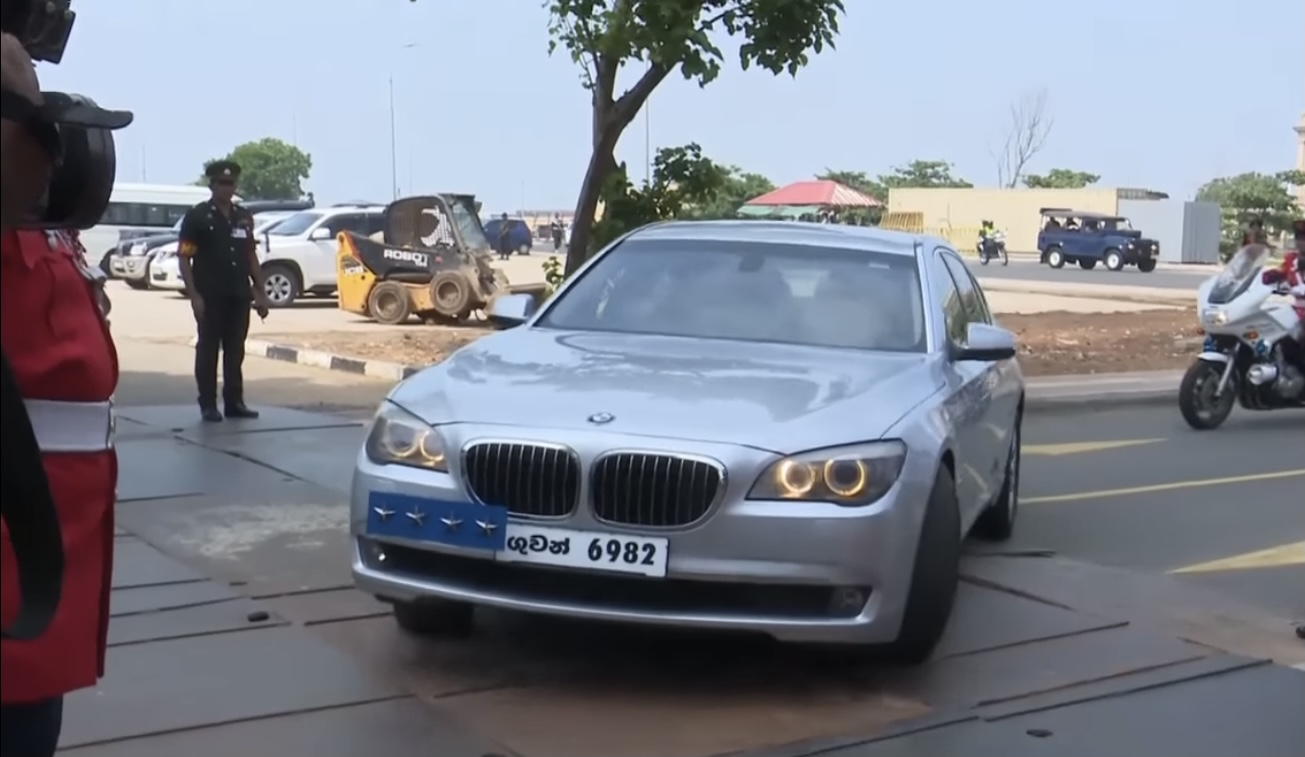
Sri Lanka Air Force BMW 5 Series (F10) with Four stars

== Five Stars ==
Field Marshal is ranked immediately above General and has been awarded only once, to Sarath Fonseka as an honorary rank. It is equivalent to Admiral of the Fleet and Marshal of the Sri Lanka Air Force. A five star Generals staff car is designated with Five stars.

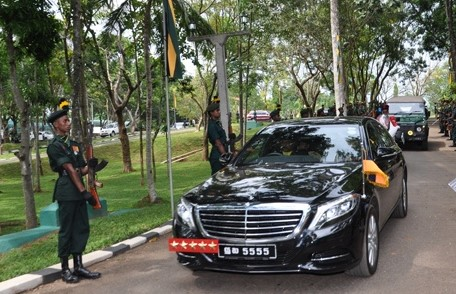
Sri Lanka Army Mercedes-Benz S-Class (W222) with Five stars

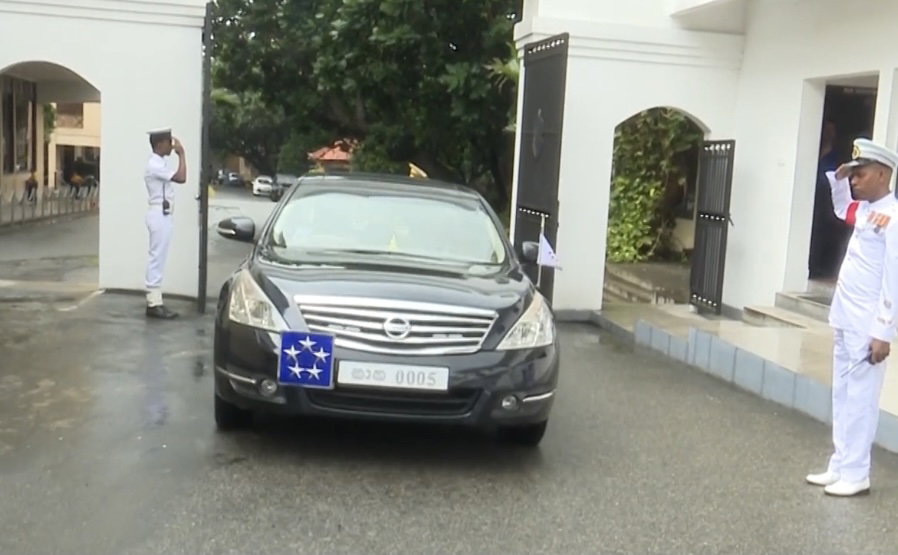
Sri Lanka Navy Nissan Sylphy B17 with Five stars

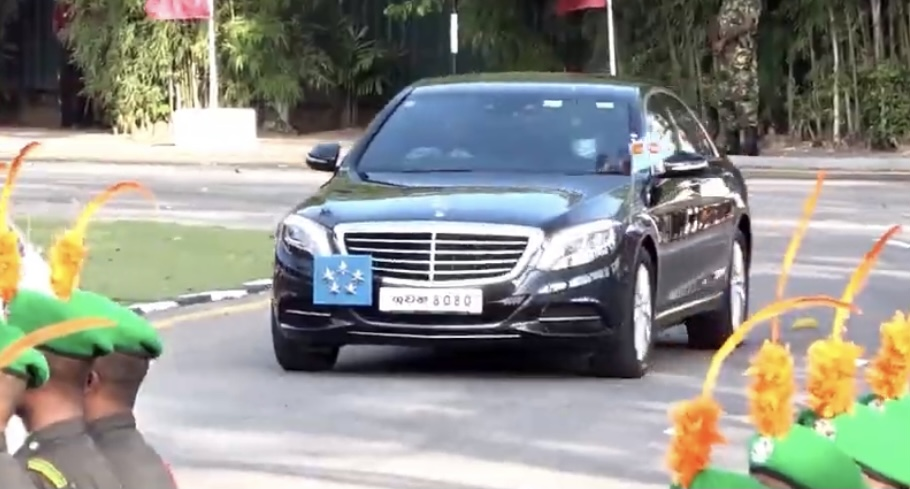
Sri Lanka Air Force Mercedes-Benz S-Class (W222) with Five stars
