= List of longest consumer road vehicles =

The following is a list of the longest private passenger vehicles of any global marque sold to individuals. The list includes light trucks as many SUV and other light trucks rank among the world's longest passenger vehicles. This list does not include freight or public transport vehicles.

== Longest vehicles ==
=== Longest sedans ===
==== Currently in production ====
10 longest sedans (current mass production)
Parent company of marque	Model name	Body style	Class	Length of longest version	Image
Rolls-Royce Motor Cars	Rolls-Royce Phantom VIII EWB	4-door sedan	Ultra-luxury car (F)	235.51 in (5.982 m)	Rolls Royce Phantom VIII Series I
FAW Group	Hongqi Guoli	4-door sedan	Ultra-luxury car (F)	235.43 in (5.980 m)	Hongqi Guoli
FAW Group	Hongqi Guoya	4-door sedan	Ultra-luxury car (F)	210.71 in (5.352 m)	Hongqi Guoya
FAW Group	Hongqi H9+	4-door sedan	Ultra-luxury car (F)	210.11 in (5.337 m)	
Rolls-Royce Motor Cars	Rolls-Royce Ghost EWB (2nd Gen.)	4-door sedan	Ultra-luxury car (F)	225.01 in (5.715 m)	Rolls Royce Ghost EWB (2nd Gen)
NAMI	Aurus Senat	4-door sedan	Ultra-luxury car (F)	221.65 in (5.630 m)	Aurus Senat
Mercedes-Benz Group AG	Mercedes-Maybach S-Class (Z223)	4-door sedan	Ultra-luxury car (F)	215.31 in (5.469 m)	Mercedes-Maybach S680
Hyundai Motor Group	Genesis G90 L	4-door sedan	Ultra-luxury car (F)	215.15 in (5.465 m)	Genesis G90 (LWB)
BMW	BMW 7 Series (G70)	4-door sedan	Full-size luxury car (F)	212.24 in (5.391 m)	BMW i7 (G70)
Toyota	Toyota Century	4-door sedan	Ultra-luxury car (F)	210.03 in (5.335 m)	Toyota Century 3rd gen

==== Discontinued models (21st century) ====
10 longest sedans (ceased production) (21st century onwards)
Parent company of marque	Model name	Body style	Class	Length of longest version	Years in Production	Image
Daimler AG	Maybach 62 / 62 S	4-door sedan	Ultra-luxury car (F)	242.95 in (6.171 m)	2002-2012	Maybach 62
Rolls-Royce Motor Cars	Rolls-Royce Phantom VII EWB	4-door sedan	Ultra-luxury car (F)	239.84 in (6.092 m)	2005-2017	Rolls Royce Phantom VII Series II EWB: Limelight Edition
Bentley Motors	Bentley Mulsanne EWB	4-door sedan	Ultra-luxury car (F)	229.33 in (5.825 m)	2016-2020	Bentley Mulsanne EWB
Bentley Motors	Bentley Arnage LWB / Arnage RL	4-door sedan	Ultra-luxury car (F)	222.04 in (5.640 m)	2001-2009	Bentley Arnage RL
Rolls-Royce Motor Cars	Rolls-Royce Park Ward	4-door sedan	Ultra-luxury car (F)	222.04 in (5.640 m)	2000-2002	Rolls Royce Park Ward
Ford Motor Company	Lincoln Town Car L	4-door sedan	Full-size luxury car	221.40 in (5.624 m)	2001-2011	Lincoln Town Car L
Ford Motor Company	Mercury Grand Marquis GSL	4-door sedan	Full-size car	220.00 in (5.588 m)	2003-2010	Mercury Grand Marquis GSL (Bahrain)
Rolls-Royce Motor Cars	Rolls Royce Ghost EWB (1st Gen.)	4-door sedan	Ultra-luxury car (F)	219.25 in (5.569 m)	2011-2020	RR Ghost Series II (1st Gen)
Ford Motor Company	Ford Crown Victoria LWB	4-door sedan	Full-size car	219.00 in (5.563 m)	2002-2011	Ford Crown Victoria LWB
FAW Group	Hongqi L5	4-door sedan	Ultra-luxury car (F)	218.70 in (5.555 m)	2014-2023	Hongqi L5
Audi AG	Audi A8 L "Horch"	4-door sedan	Ultra-luxury car (F)	214.56 in (5.450 m)	2021-2026	Audi A8 L "Horch"

=== Longest SUVs ===
10 longest SUVs (current mass production)
Parent company of marque	Model name	Body style	Class	Length of longest version	Image
General Motors	Cadillac Escalade ESV	5-door wagon	Extended-length luxury SUV	227.00 in (5.766 m)	
Stellantis	Jeep (Grand) Wagoneer L (WS)	5-door wagon	Extended-length luxury SUV	226.70 in (5.758 m)	
General Motors	Chevrolet Suburban	5-door wagon	Extended-length SUV	225.70 in (5.733 m)	
General Motors	GMC Yukon XL	5-door wagon	Extended-length luxury SUV	225.20 in (5.720 m)	
FAW Group	Hongqi Guoyao	5-door wagon	Full-size luxury SUV	224.21 in (5.695 m)	
Ford Motor Company	Ford Expedition MAX Lincoln Navigator L	5-door wagon	Extended-length (luxury) SUV	221.90 in (5.636 m)	
Aurus Motors	Aurus Komendant	5-door wagon	Full-size luxury SUV	211.81 in (5.380 m)	Aurus Komendant
Jaguar Land Rover	Land Rover Defender 130	5-door wagon	Full-size luxury SUV	210.94 in (5.358 m)*; 5.099 m (without rear mount spare wheel)	
Rolls Royce Motor Cars	Rolls-Royce Cullinan	5-door wagon	Full-size ultra-luxury SUV	210.27 in (5.341 m)	
Toyota	Toyota Century SUV	5-door SUV	Full-size luxury SUV	210.03 in (5.335 m)	

*The Defender 130's Length counts the spare wheel in the back of the vehicle. Nissan Armada 208.9 in (5.305 m) in last place if not counting spare wheel.

=== Longest pickup trucks ===
10 longest pickup trucks (current mass production)
Parent company of marque	Model name	Body style	Class	Length of longest version
General Motors	GMC Sierra HD	2-door single cab 2+2 door extended cab 4-door crew cab	Full-size pickup truck	266.77 in (6.776 m)
Ford	Ford Super Duty	2-door single cab 2+2 door extended cab 4-door crew cab	Full-size pickup truck	266.20 in (6.761 m)
General Motors	Chevrolet Silverado HD	2-door single cab 2+2 door extended cab 4-door crew cab	Full-size pickup truck	266.06 in (6.758 m)
Stellantis	RAM HD	2-door single cab 2+2 door extended cab 4-door crew cab	Full-size pickup truck	260.80 in (6.624 m)
Toyota	Toyota Tundra	2-door single cab 2+2 door extended cab 4-door crew cab	Full-size pickup truck	252.50 in (6.414 m)
Ford	Ford F-Series	2-door single cab 2+2 door extended cab 4-door crew cab	Full-size pickup truck	243.50 in (6.185 m)
Volkswagen	Volkswagen Amarok	2-door single cab 4-door crew cab	Mid-size pickup truck	232.3 in (5.90 m)
Toyota	Toyota Tacoma	2+2 door extended cab 4-door crew cab	Mid-size pickup truck	225.5 in (5.73 m)
Nissan	Nissan Frontier	2+2 door extended cab 4-door crew cab	Mid-size pickup truck	224.1 in (5.69 m)

=== Longest supercars ===
- Maserati MC12 - 5,143 mm (202.5 in)
- McLaren Speedtail - 5,137 mm (202.2 in)
- Pagani Codalunga - 4,980 mm (196 in)

== See also ==
- Articulated bus
- Definition and list of full-size vehicles
- Passenger vehicles in the United States
- List of car manufacturers
- Land yacht (automobile)
- Longest road trains
