= Aurus Motors =

Russian executive car company

Aurus Motors Ltd.
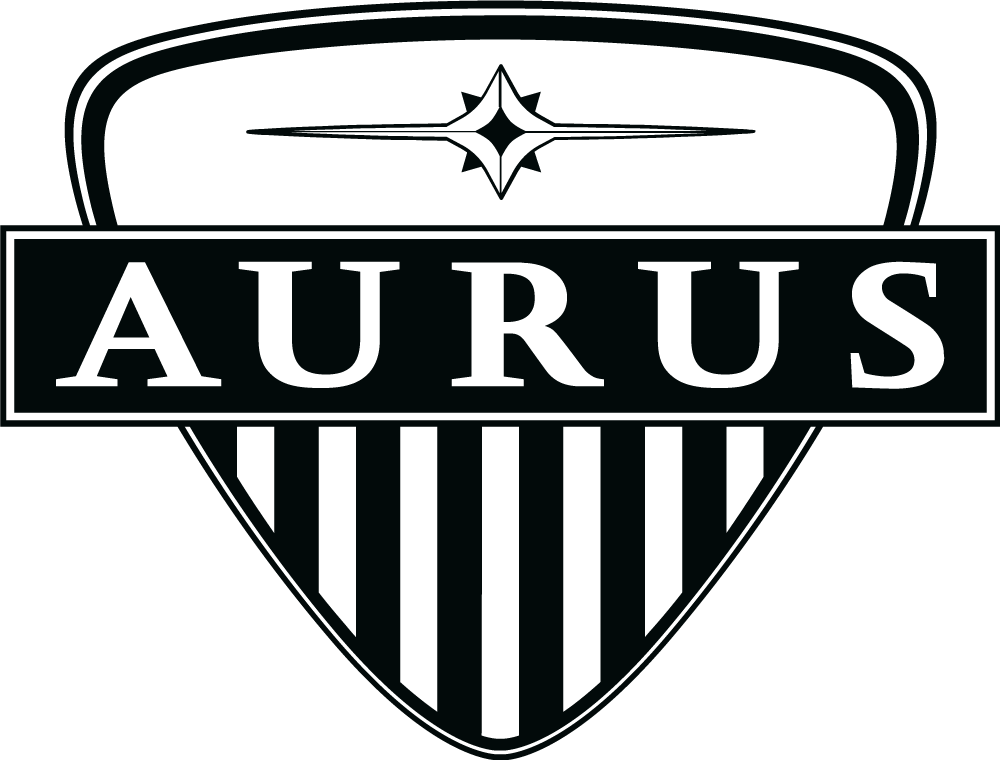
- Native name: Аурус Моторс
- Type: Private
- Industry: Automotive
- Founded: 2018; 8 years ago
- Headquarters: Moscow, Russia
- Area served: Worldwide
- Key people: Andrey Pankov (CEO)
- Products: Automobiles
- Owner: NAMI (63.5%); Tawazun Holding (36%); Sollers JSC (0.5%)
- Website: aurusmotors.com

Aurus Motors (Russian: Аурус Моторс) is a Russian luxury car company founded in 2018, originally strictly as a Russian motorcade vehicle brand until 2021 when the company's first civilian model, the Aurus Senat, began production in May. The automaker claims to have sold 115 cars in 2023. Facelifts are planned for 2026 and 2030. President Putin had a facelifted Aurus in 2024.

== Name ==
According to the company, Aurus is a portmanteau of aura or aurum (Latin for 'gold') and Rus.

== History ==
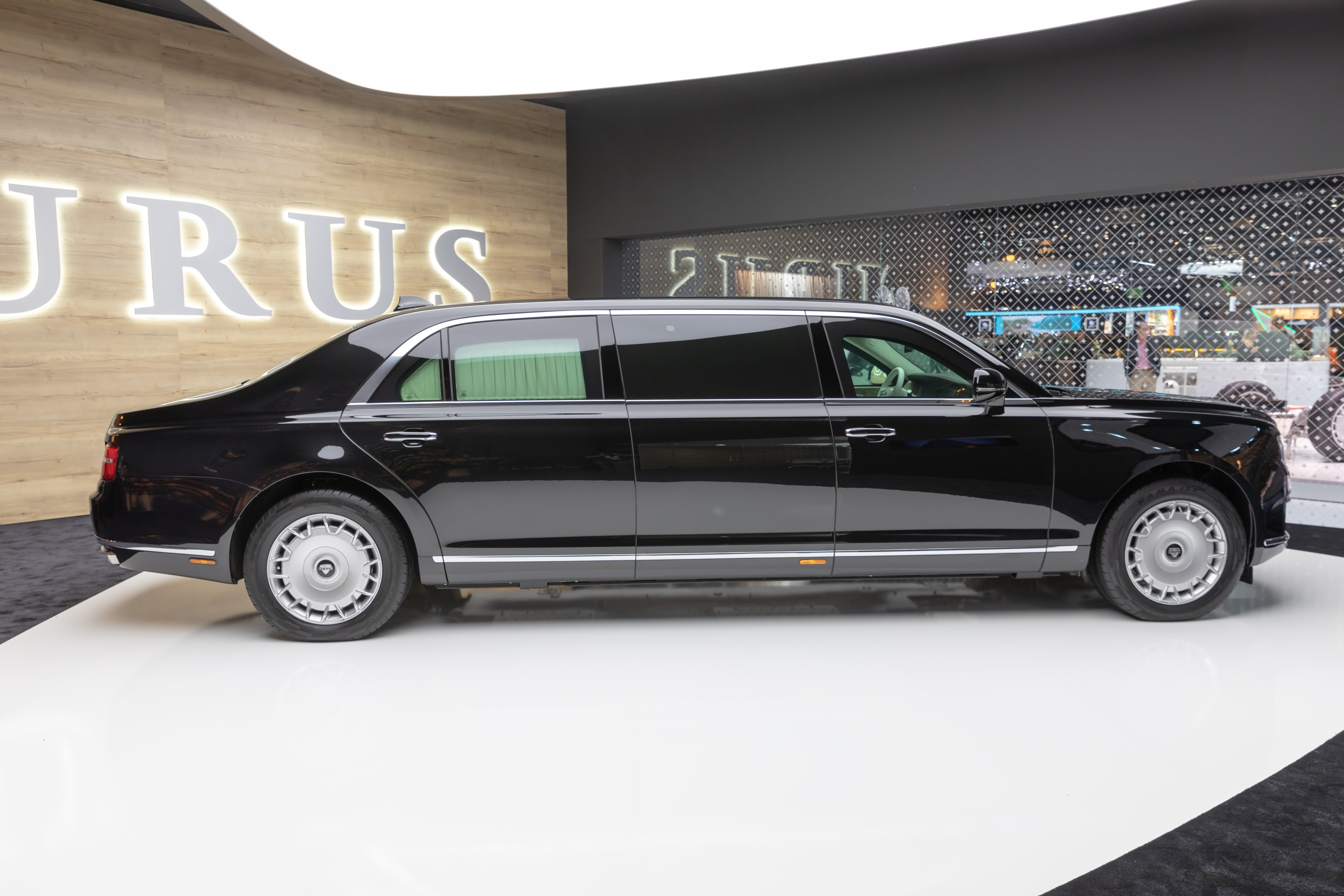
Aurus Senat Limousine at the 2019 Geneva International Motor Show

In 2013, NAMI began development on a new Russian presidential state car to replace the then-current Mercedes-Benz S 600 Pullman Guard.

In 2018, the new Russian presidential state car and motorcade vehicles were introduced under the Aurus Kortezh (Russian for cortege or motorcade) line of vehicles. This includes the Senat sedan and limousine, Arsenal van, and Komendant SUV. The three vehicles are named after Kremlin towers.

On 19 February 2019, the Russia Ministry of Industry and Trade announced that Abu Dhabi, United Arab Emirates-based company Tawazun Holding would invest in a 36% stake of Aurus Motors for US$124 million within the next three years and would distribute Aurus cars in the Middle East.

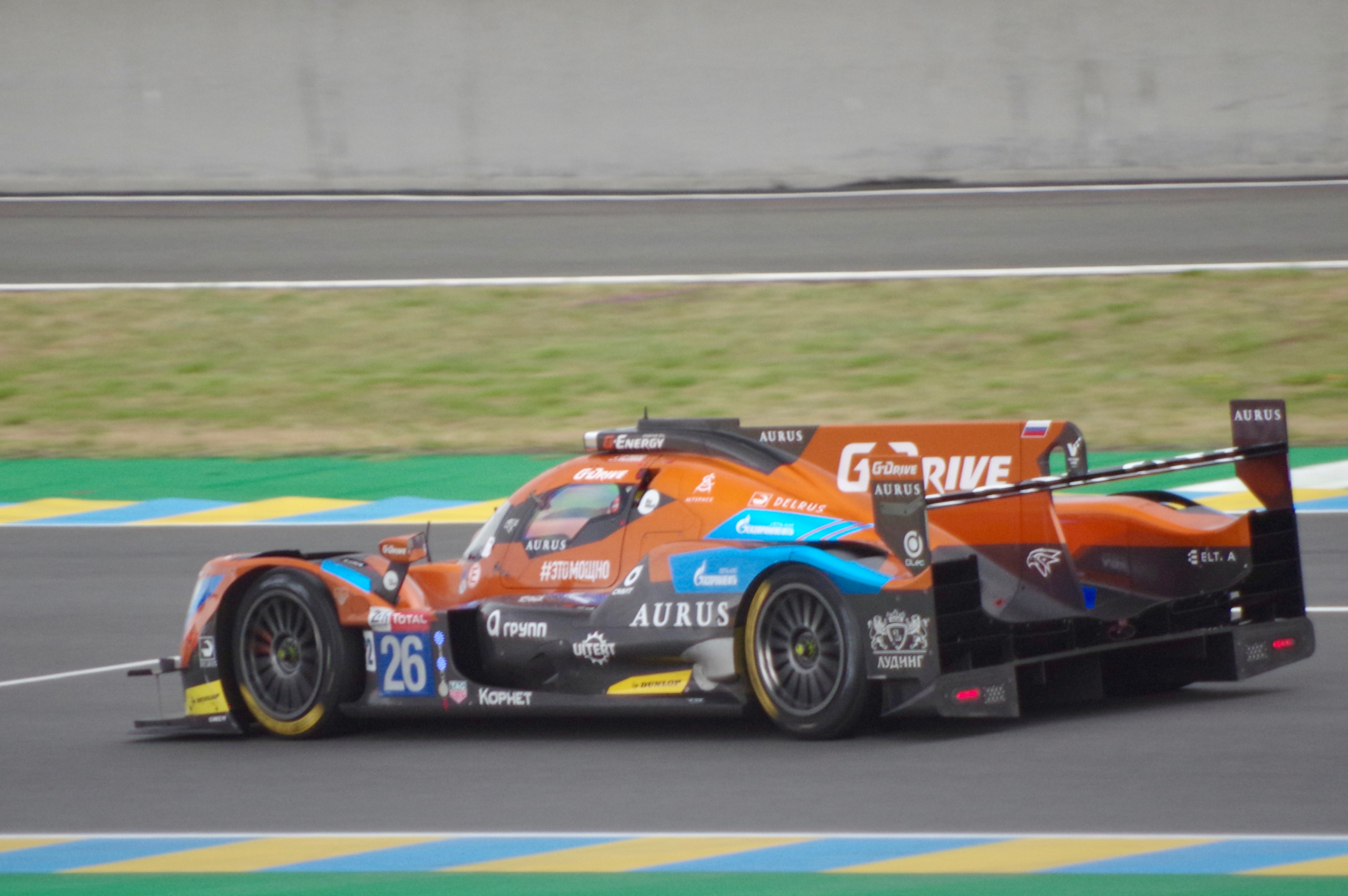
Aurus 01 in the 2019 24 Hours of Le Mans

At the 2019 Geneva International Motor Show in March, Aurus exhibited the Senat and Senat Limousine, previewing future sale of the models.

At the 2019 24 Hours of Le Mans from 15 to 16 June, G-Drive Racing partnered with Aurus and raced an Oreca 07 rebadged as the Aurus 01. The team finished 11th place in the race with 364 laps.

In May 2021, Sollers JSC began civilian-use production of the Senat motorcade car at the Yelabuga, Tatarstan Ford Sollers plant, where the Russian-spec Ford Transit was produced. The base model started at ~18 million rubles (US$243k), while the launch edition model was priced at ~22 million rubles (US$297k).

== Models ==
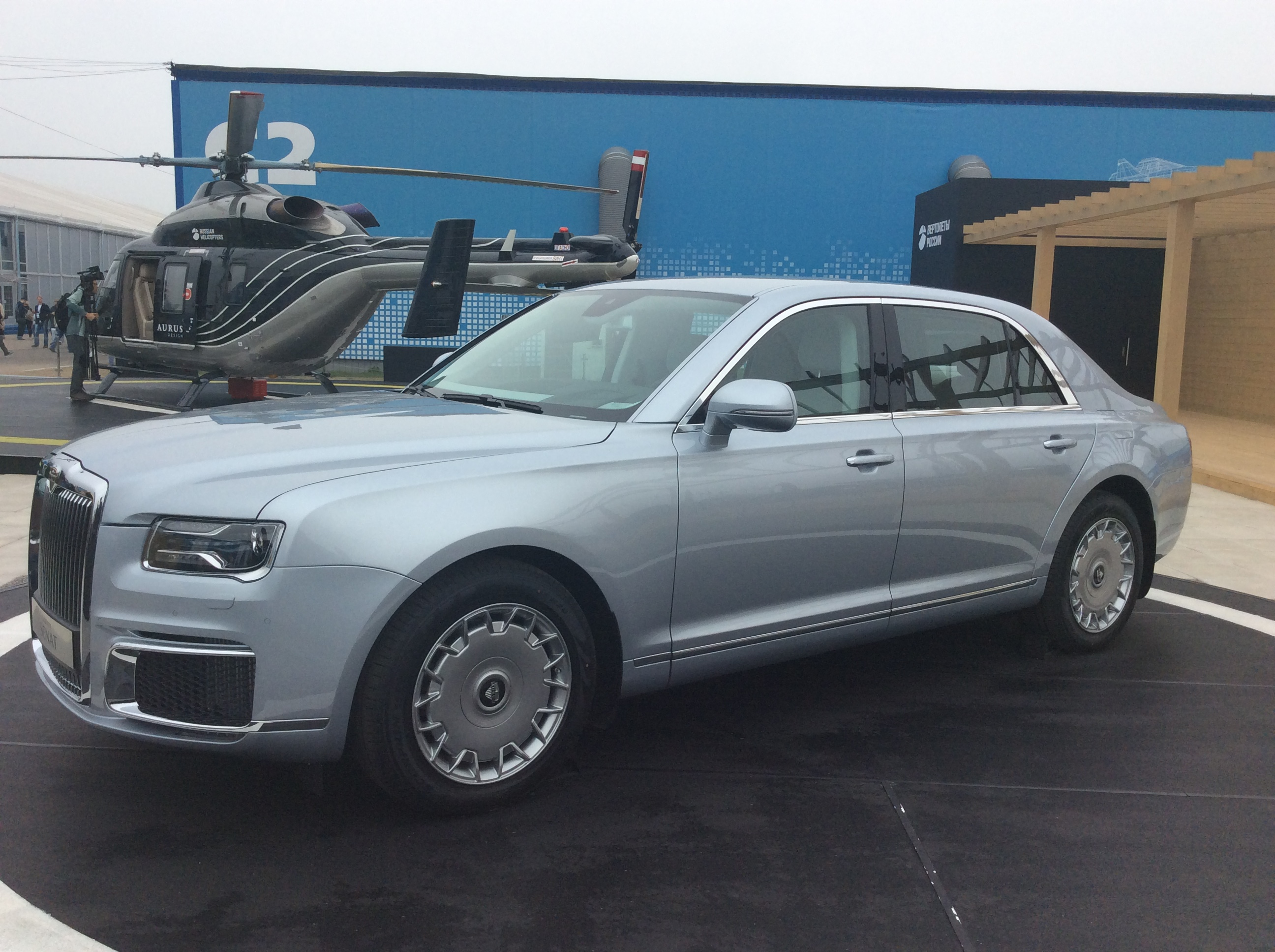
Aurus Senat at the 2019 International Aviation and Space Show in Moscow

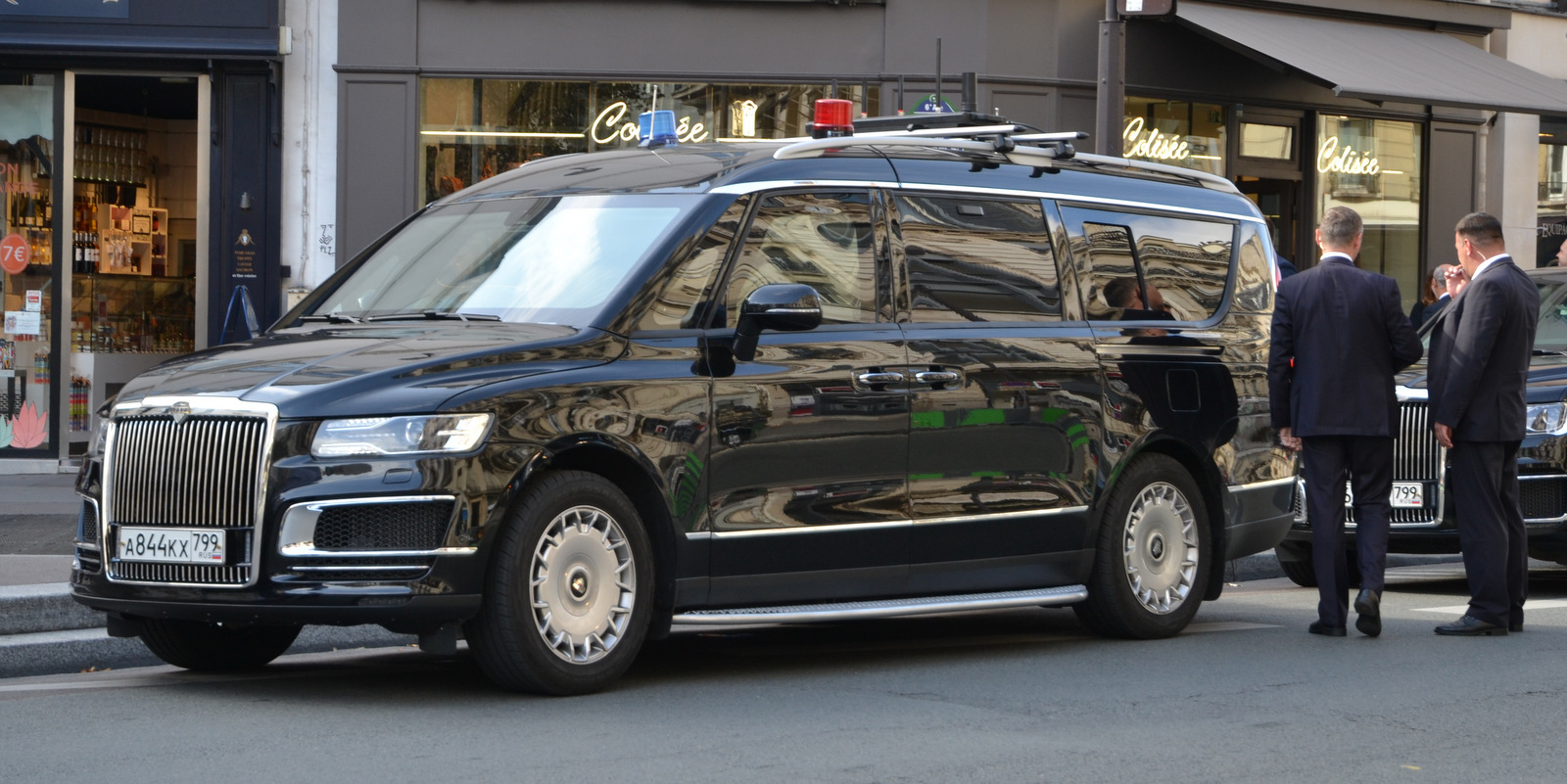
Aurus Arsenal in Paris, France

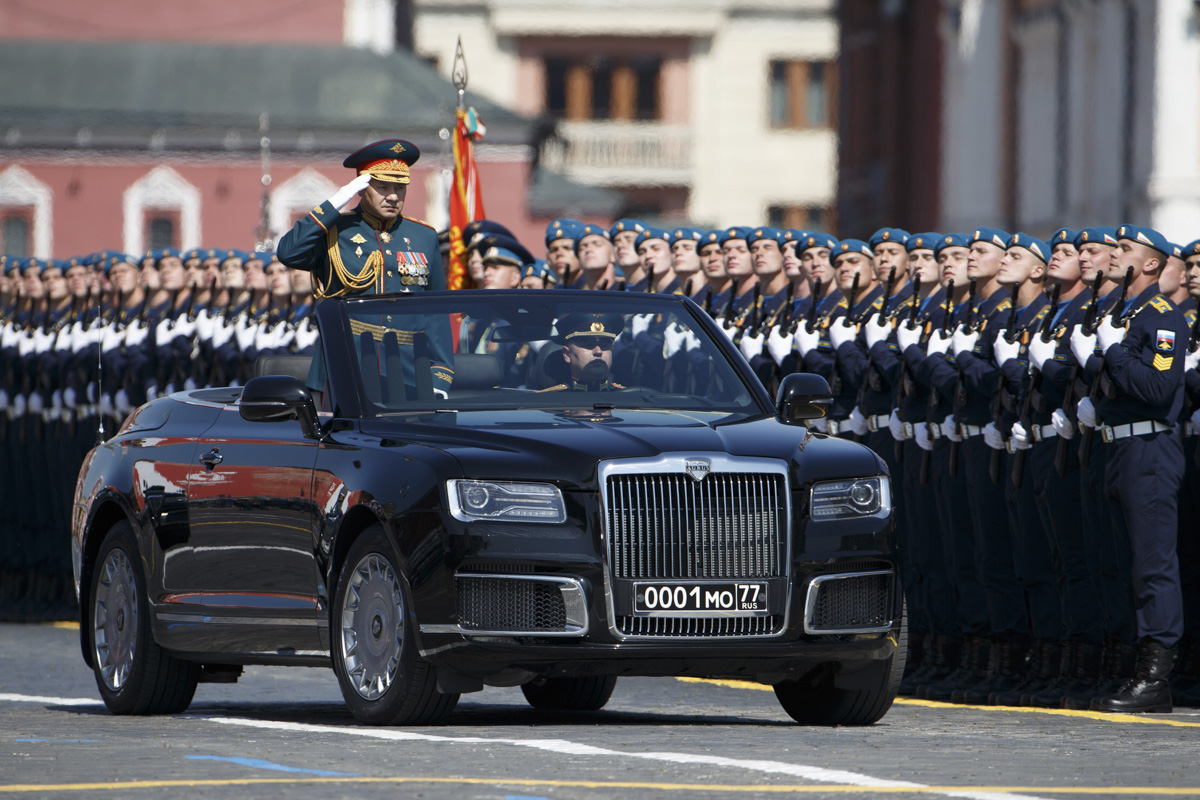
Aurus Senat Convertible in the 2020 Moscow Victory Day Parade

=== Kortezh series ===
The Aurus Kortezh line is developed by NAMI and manufactured by Sollers.

==== Civilian models ====
- Senat (2021–present), a full-size luxury sedan
- Senat Limousine (2021–present), an armored limousine based on the Senat sedan

==== Motorcade vehicles ====
- Arsenal - a luxury passenger van (Аурус Арсенал)
- Senat - a full-size luxury sedan (Аурус Сенат)
  - Senat Convertible - a luxury convertible (Аурус Сенат Кабриолет)
  - Senat Limousine - an armored limousine based on the Senat sedan and the official Russian president state car (Аурус Сенат Лимузин)
- Senat 900 - a full-size luxury sedan rebranded from Hongqi H9 (Аурус Сенат 900)
- Komendant (released in November 2022), a luxury full-size SUV (Комендант)

==== Upcoming models ====
- Merlon (to be released in 2023), an electric motorcycle prototype (Мерлон)
- Zero emissions Aurus, a hydrogen vehicle prototype

=== Motorsport vehicles ===
- 01, a rebadged version of the Oreca 07 Le Mans Prototype racing car, released in 2019 and eligible for the 24 Hours of Le Mans
