= Aurus Arsenal =

Russian luxury minivan

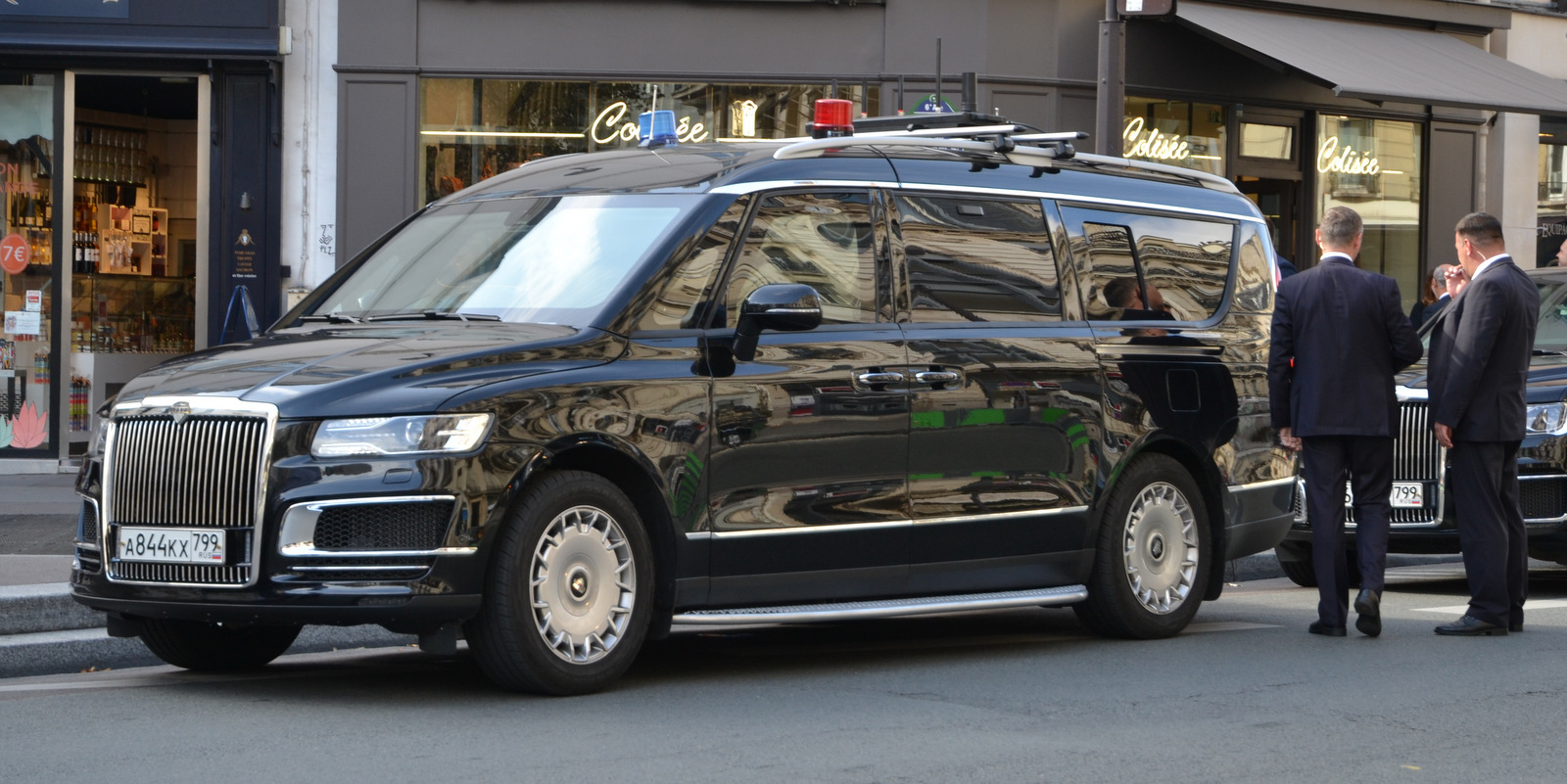

Overview
- Manufacturer: Aurus Motors
- Production: May 2018–present
- Model years: 2022–present
- Designer: Yuri Chernenko, Vadim Pereverzev

Body and chassis
- Class: Minivan
- Body style: 5-door minivan; 5-door armoured minivan
- Layout: Longitudinal front-engine, four-wheel drive

Powertrain
- Engine: 4.4 L NAMI/Porsche Engineering developed V8
- Electric motor: SEGZ, 57 hp (43 kW)
- Transmission: 9-speed KATE R932 automatic

Dimensions
- Wheelbase: 3,550 mm (139.8 in)
- Length: 5,980 mm (235.4 in)
- Width: 2,020 mm (79.5 in)
- Height: 2,090 mm (82.3 in)
- Curb weight: 4,950 kg (10,913 lb)

The Aurus Arsenal (Russian: Арсена́л) is a luxury minivan by Russian automaker Aurus Motors and developed by NAMI in Moscow, Russia.

The Aurus Arsenal is part of the Kortezh series of luxury vehicles, which includes the Senat limousine and the Komendant SUV.

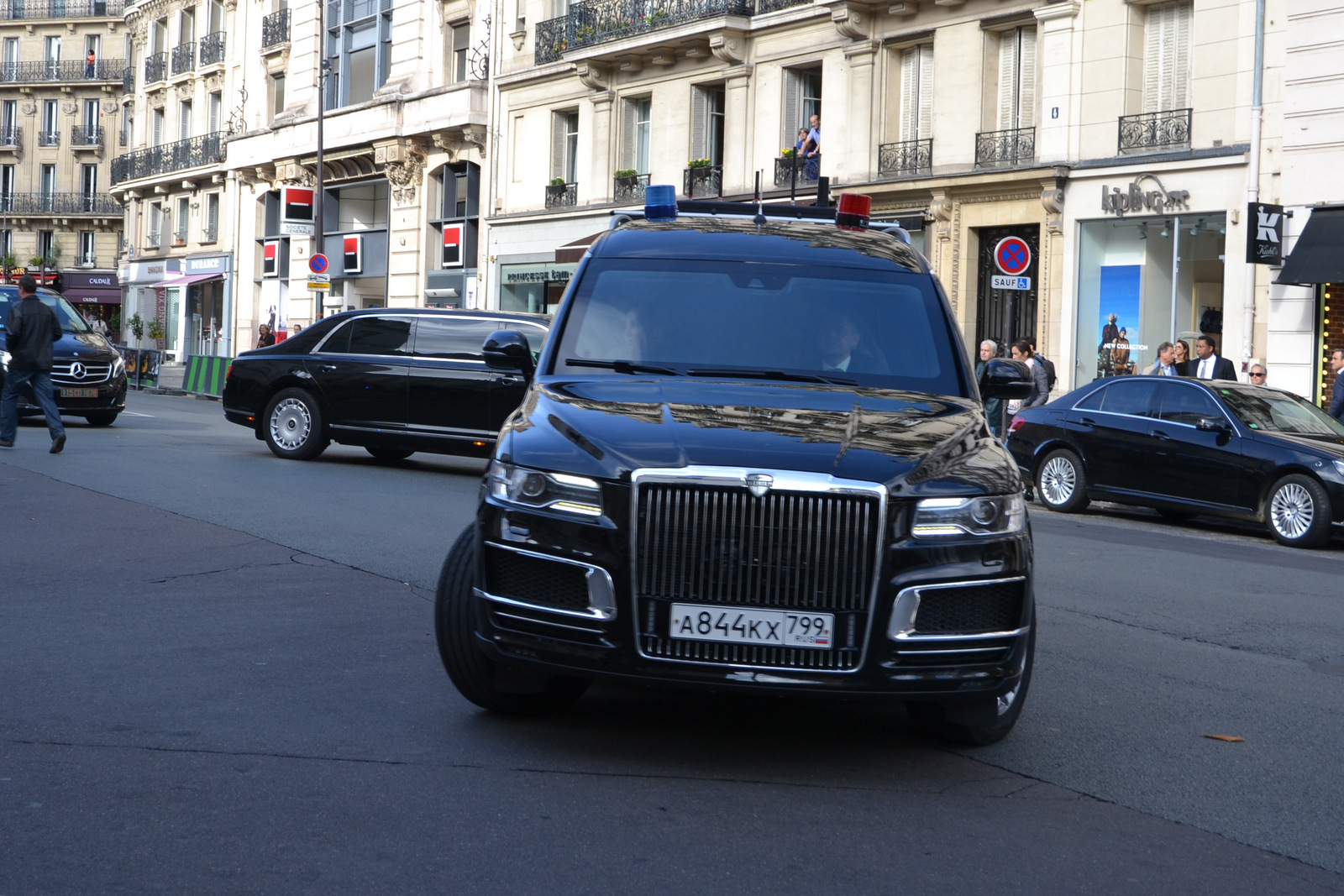
Front view

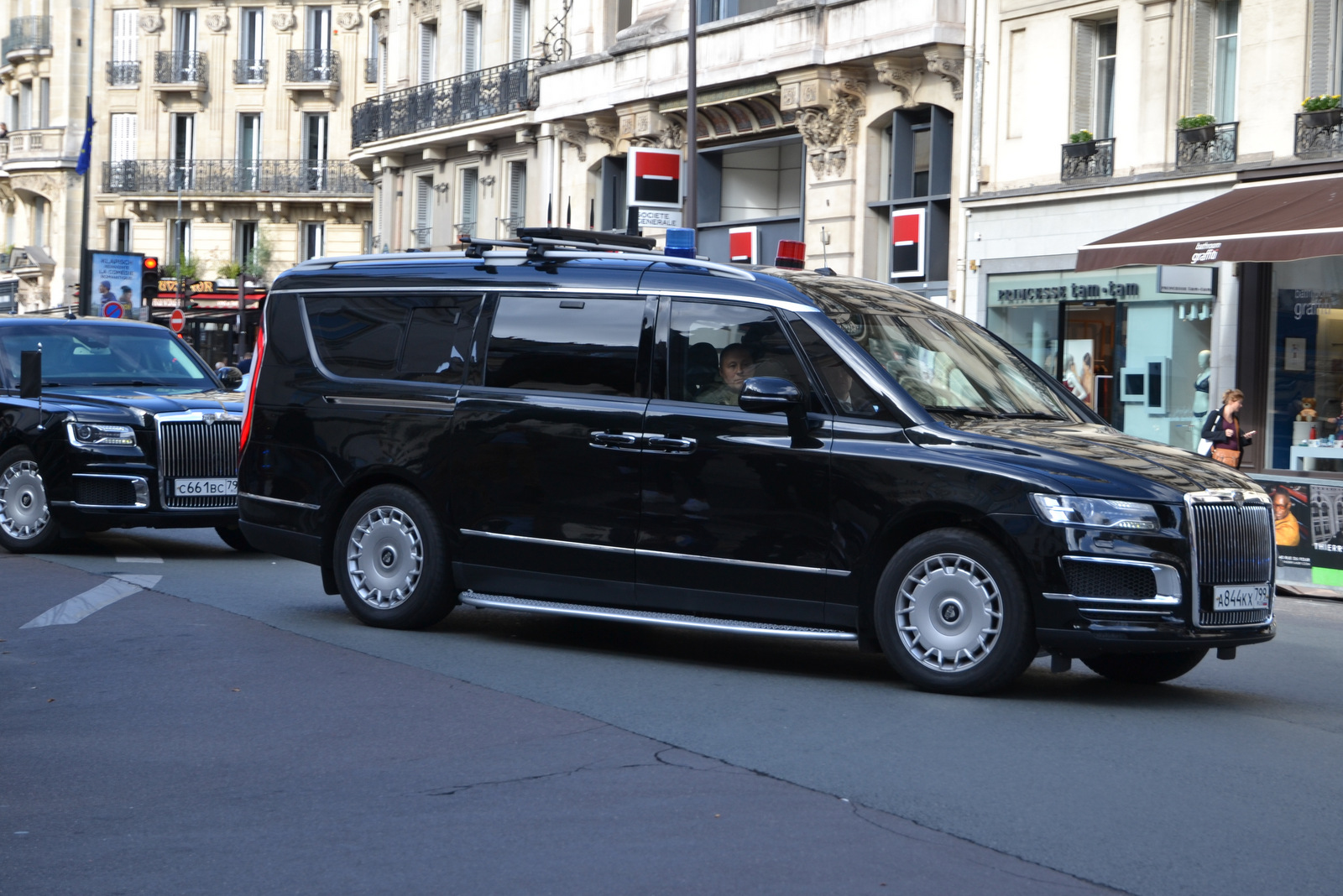
Aurus Arsenal minivan

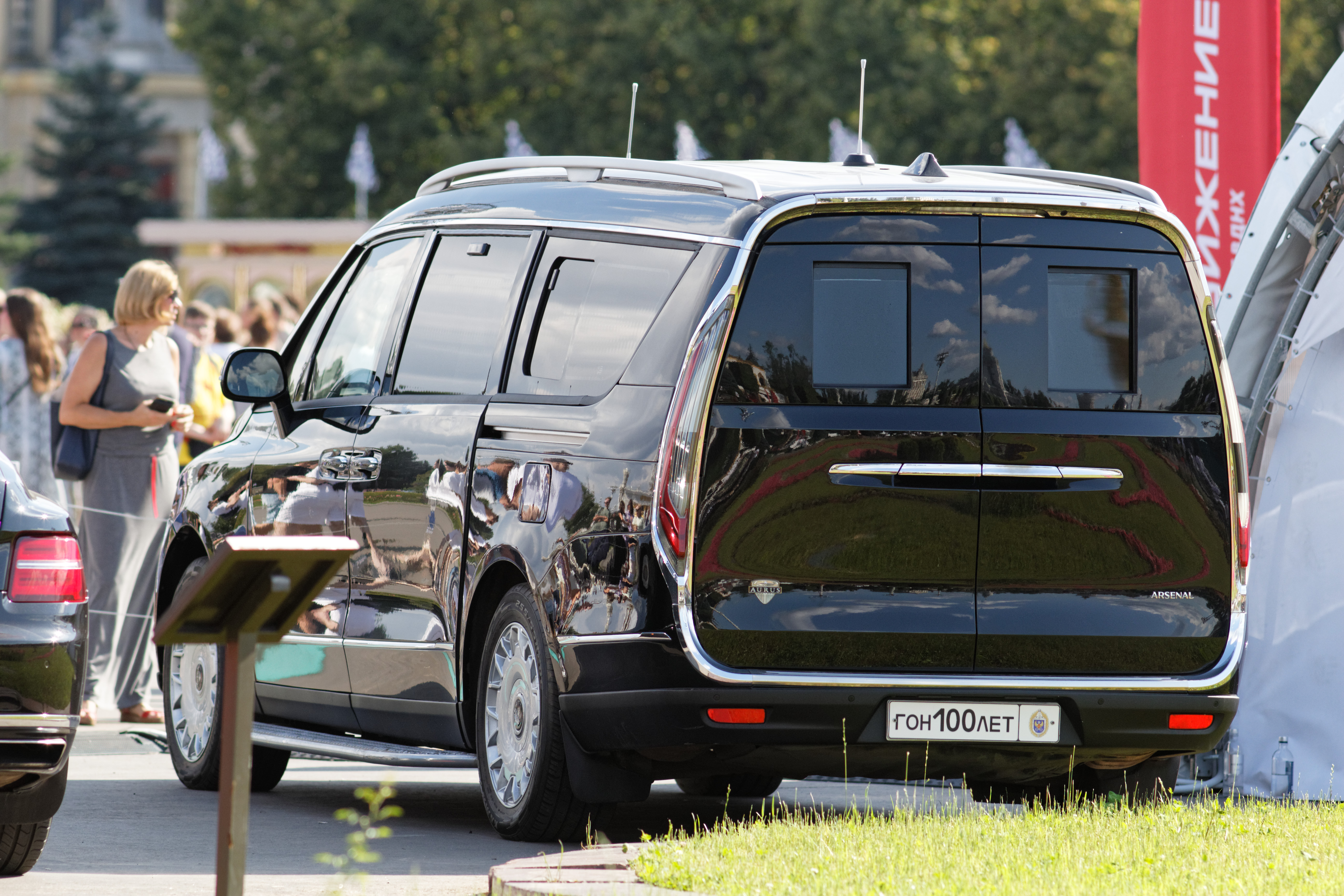
Rear view

== Appearance and characteristics ==
The Aurus Arsenal minivan has the same radiator grille as the Aurus Senat sedan, with its own headlights. A distinctive feature of the Aurus Arsenal is the structure of the rear pillars: they are wide at the bottom, narrow at the top and have a reverse slope. It differs in its hood layout, rather than a carriage one, which allows the placing of engines with larger overall dimensions.

The car is equipped with a hybrid power plant consisting of a 4.4-litre V8 gasoline engine (598 hp) and a nine-speed automatic transmission with an integrated electric motor (with a nominal output of 38 hp and a peak output of 63 hp).
