= Sport-900 =

Overview
- Manufacturer: NAMI

Body and chassis
- Doors: 2
- Chassis: Coupe
- Related: ZAZ-965

Powertrain
- Power output: 30HP

Dimensions
- Length: 3725mm
- Width: 1450mm
- Height: 1170mm
- Curb weight: 500Kg

The KD/Sport 900 is a soviet sports car manufactured in small numbers between 1963 and 1969 by a group of NAMI employees.

The Sport-900 is a 2 seat coupe with a fiberglass body powered by a 0.9L 4 cylinder engine derived from the ZAZ-965A which gave the car a top speed of 120 Km/h.
