= Special Purpose Garage =

Garage for Special Purposes
- Гараж особого назначения Garazh osobogo naznacheniya

Agency overview
- Formed: 1 January 1921
- Headquarters: Moscow
- Employees: Classified
- Agency executive: Director
- Parent agency: Federal Protective Agency

Special Purpose Garage (Russian: Гараж особого назначения) is a structural subdivision of the Federal Protective Service of Russia. According to the law "On state security", Special Garage employees ensure the safe movement of the President of Russia, the Prime Minister of Russia, the heads of both chambers of the Federal Assembly, as well as the leaders of all foreign states visiting Russia. Among others, the unit is responsible for the Presidential state car and is a unit within the Federal Protective Service.

== History ==
The special-purpose garage was created by the decision of the Council of People's Commissars on January 1, 1921. The garage was headed by Vladimir Lenin's personal driver Stepan Gil. In 1922, he was replaced in this post by Joseph Stalin's personal driver Pavel Udalov, who headed the garage until 1953.

At various times, the garage's fleet consisted of both foreign and domestically produced cars. In the 1920s and 1930s, these were Rolls-Royce, Packard, Isotta Fraschini, Vauxhall, Lincoln and other brands of cars. From the second half of the 1930s, after the development of high-end car production in the Soviet Union, the fleet of cars became almost entirely domestic, consisting of GAZ and ZiL cars.

In post-Soviet Russia, the fleet consisted of mainly foreign-made cars until May 7, 2018, when the Aurus Senat was first entered into use during Putin's 2018 presidential inauguration.
