= Aurus Komendant =

Russian luxury SUV

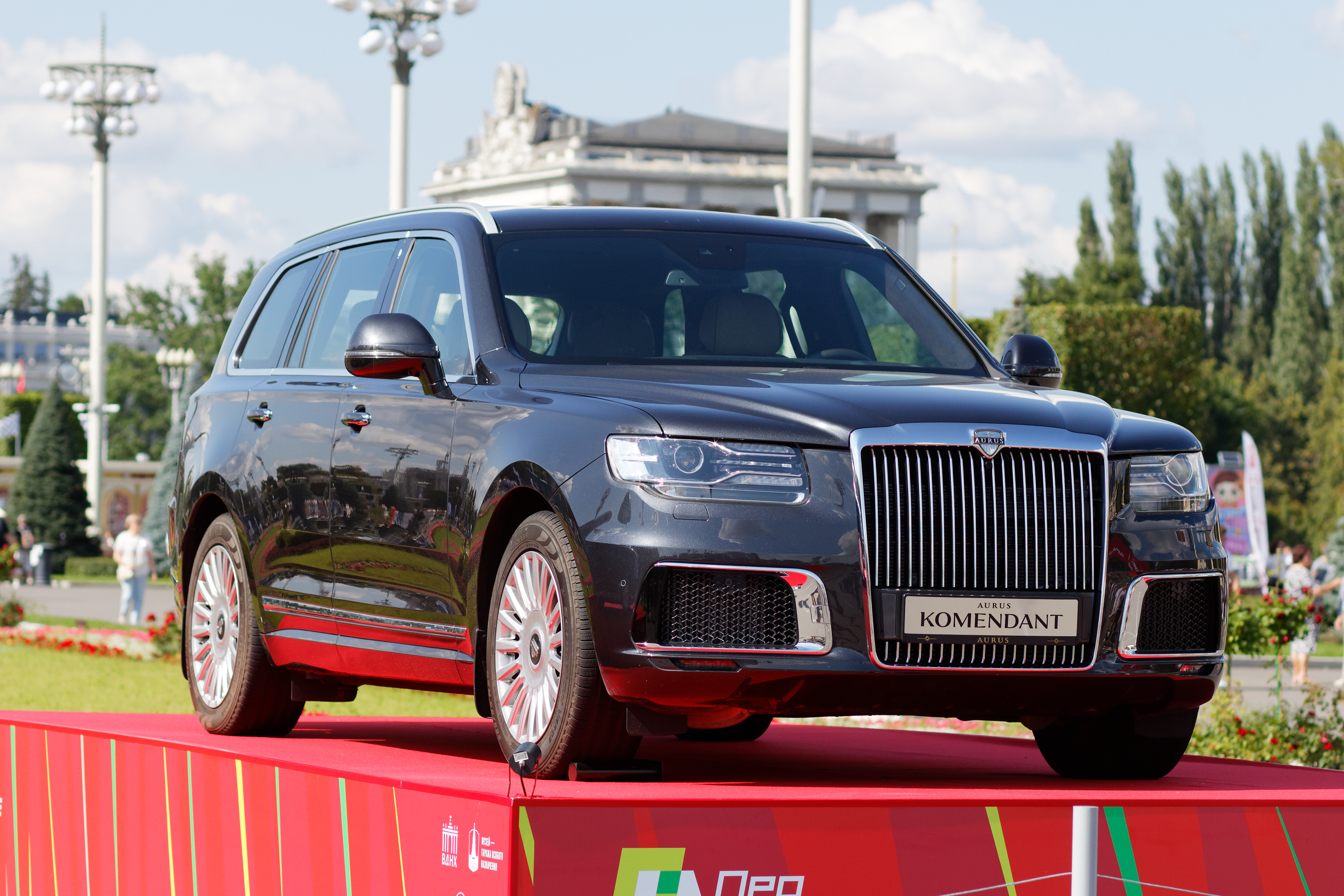

Overview
- Manufacturer: Aurus Motors
- Production: November 2022 - present
- Designer: Mike Robinson

Body and chassis
- Class: Full-size luxury crossover SUV
- Body style: 5-door SUV
- Layout: Front-engine, four-wheel drive

Powertrain
- Engine: 4.4 L NAMI mild hybrid V8
- Transmission: 9-speed KATE R932 automatic

Dimensions
- Wheelbase: 3,100 mm (122.0 in)
- Length: 5,380 mm (211.8 in)
- Width: 2,004 mm (78.9 in)
- Height: 1,820 mm (71.7 in)
- Curb weight: 3,295 kg (7,264 lb)

The Aurus Komendant is a luxury SUV produced by Russian automaker Aurus Motors and developed by NAMI in Moscow, Russia. It is named after the name of the Komendantskaya Tower of the Moscow Kremlin. The Komendant is part of the Kortezh series of luxury vehicles, which includes the Senat limousine and the Arsenal minivan.

== History ==
Production was planned for the end of 2020; later these plans were postponed to 2022 and later 2023. The official plan for year 2023 for the SUV is 200 cars.

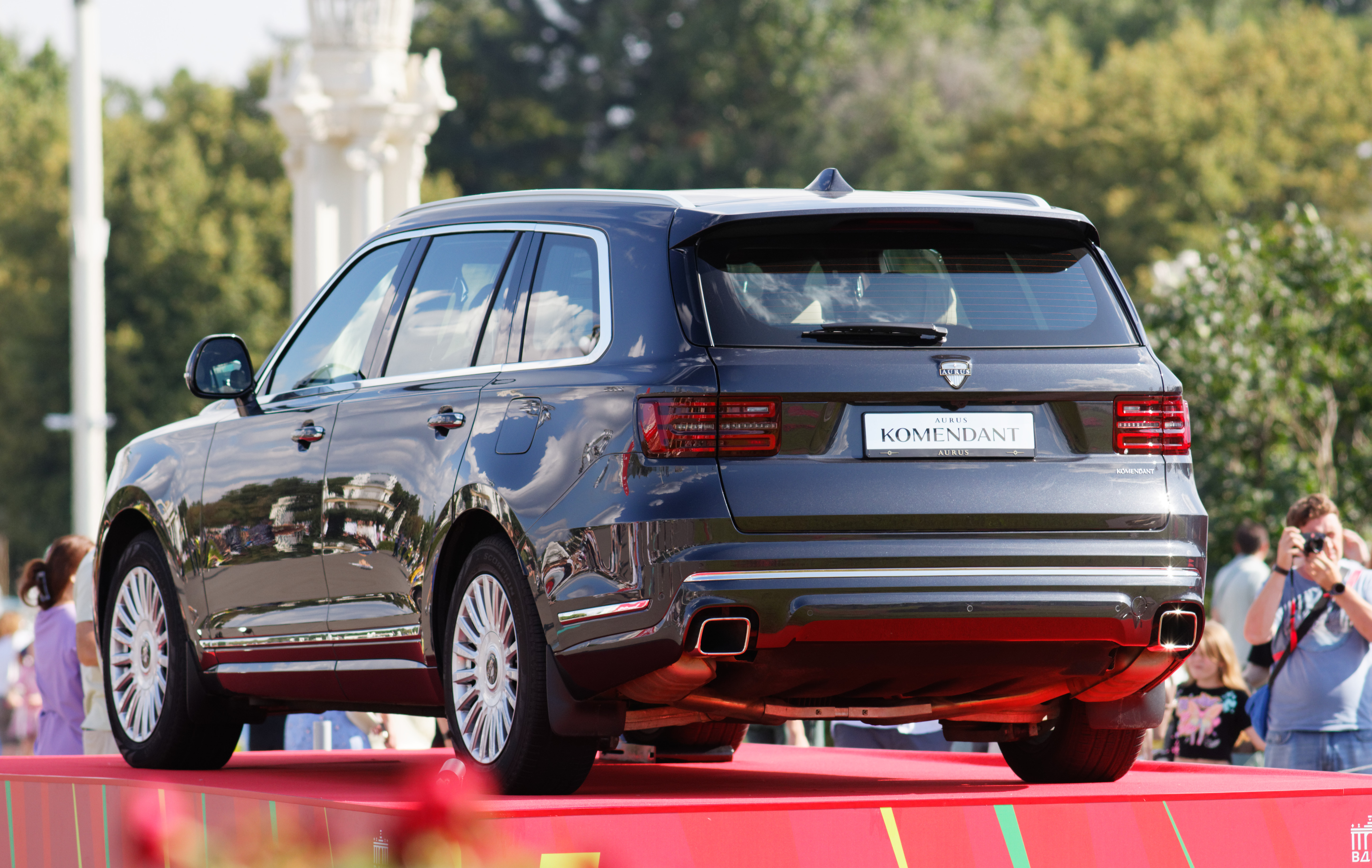
Rear view

The name of the model was chosen after the name of the Commandant's Tower of the Moscow Kremlin.

== Design ==
The car's appearance has been compared to that of the Rolls-Royce Cullinan, with tail lights comparable to the Bentley Bentayga's.

== Characteristics ==
The dimensions of the vehicle are 5380 × 2004 × 1820 mm, the wheelbase is 3100 mm. Weight is 3.2 tons.

The standard clearance is 230 mm. There is an adaptive suspension that allows changes to the ground clearance in the range from 200 to 260 mm, including on the move.

A hybrid power plant is planned for the vehicle, consisting of an eight-cylinder 4.4-litre gasoline engine with a turbine (power 598 hp, torque 880 Nm), a compact electric motor and an automatic transmission with 9 speeds. The battery of the hybrid power plant is placed above the rear axle in order to optimize weight distribution. The power plant provides acceleration to 100 km/h in 6.5 seconds.
