= Presidential state car (Russia) =

Official state automobile of the president of the Russian Federation

The Russian presidential state car is the official state car of the President of Russia.

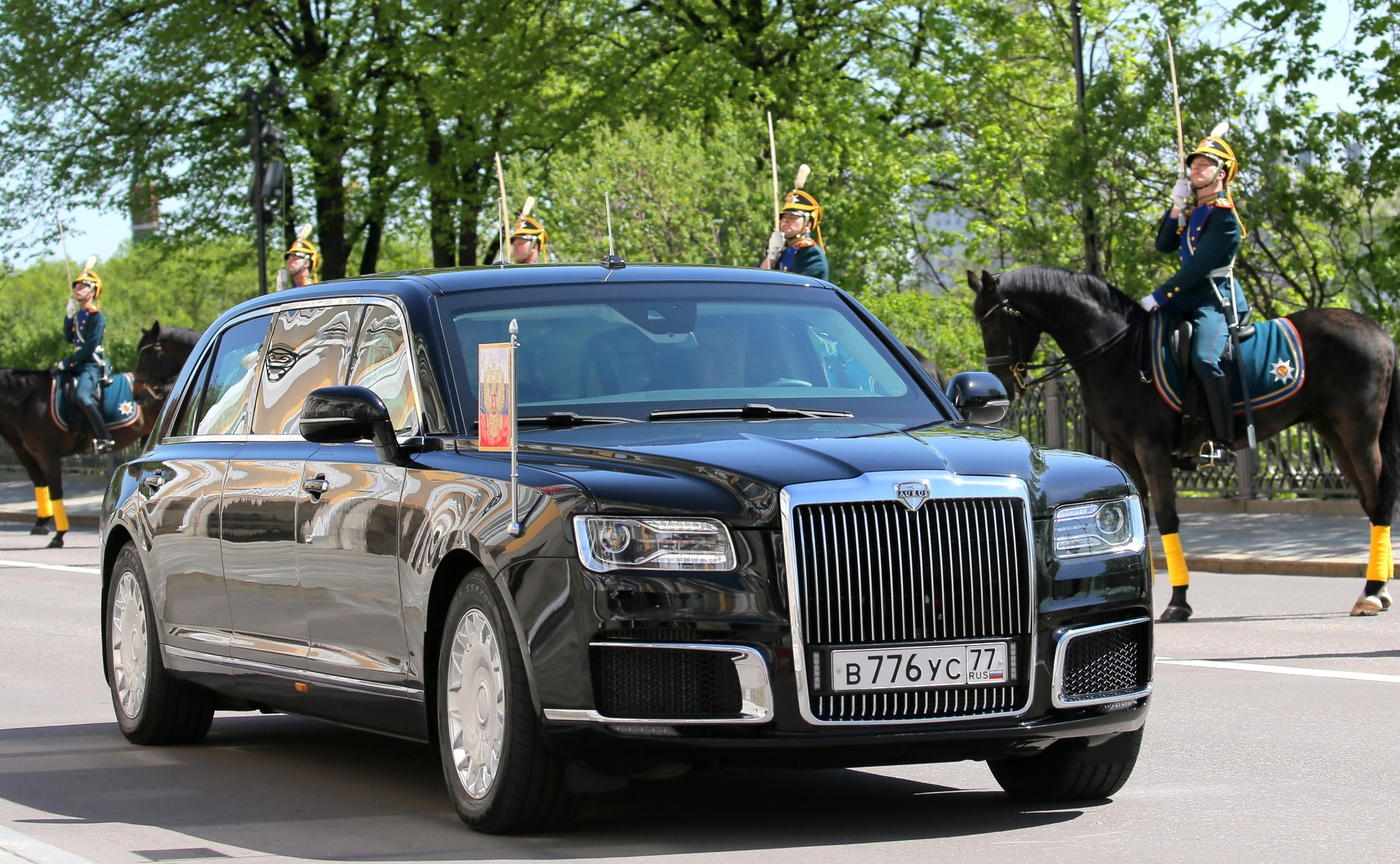
Aurus Senat limousine at the 2018 inauguration of Vladimir Putin

The current presidential state car is an Aurus Senat limousine, which replaced a Mercedes-Benz S 600 Guard Pullman. The car is equipped with many life-saving, offensive, and defensive measures, and is built to the Federal Protective Service's standards.

The Aurus Senat was developed in Russia by the NAMI as part of the "Kortezh" project. The Senat was publicly presented for the first time at the Fourth inauguration of Vladimir Putin in 2018.

== Previous generations ==
Under the USSR, the General Secretary of the Communist Party was always driven in a Soviet-built ZIL-41052, escorted by Chaikas. Two ZIL limousines are still maintained in the Kremlin garage, and are occasionally used in Day of Victory military parades.

The first foreign limousine used by a Russian president was a W140 Mercedes-Benz S-Class purchased for Boris Yeltsin. This was superseded by a Mercedes-Benz W220, then by a W221. The limousines used by Presidents Yeltsin and Medvedev were stretched and armoured by the Belgian firm Carat Duchatelet; for Medvedev's inauguration a special Carat Duchatelet limousine with a raised roof was ordered. Putin's Mercedes was a Mercedes-Benz-produced S600 Pullman Guard.

== Operation ==
Recent Russian presidential state cars have been bulletproof, had solid rubber tires, and carried an array of communications equipment.

On state visits, the state car is airlifted to the destination by an Ilyushin Il-76 transport aircraft.

The presidential motorcade is usually escorted by Ural or BMW motorcycles; and Mercedes G-Class, Mercedes E-Class, S-Class, BMW 5 Series, Volkswagen Caravelle, and/or Chevrolet support vehicles.

National transport services for the Russian President are provided by the Special Purpose Garage (SPG). The SPG is a unit within the Federal Protective Service.

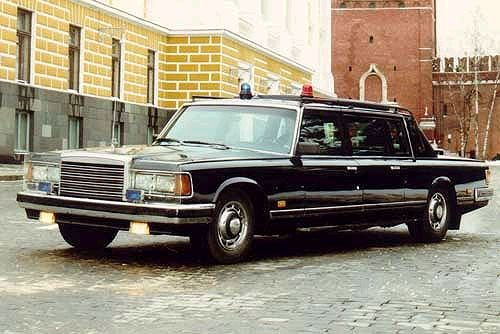
ZIL-41072 "Scorpion" car for presidential guards

== See also ==
- Official state car
- Aurus Senat
- ZiL
