= Hongqi H9 =

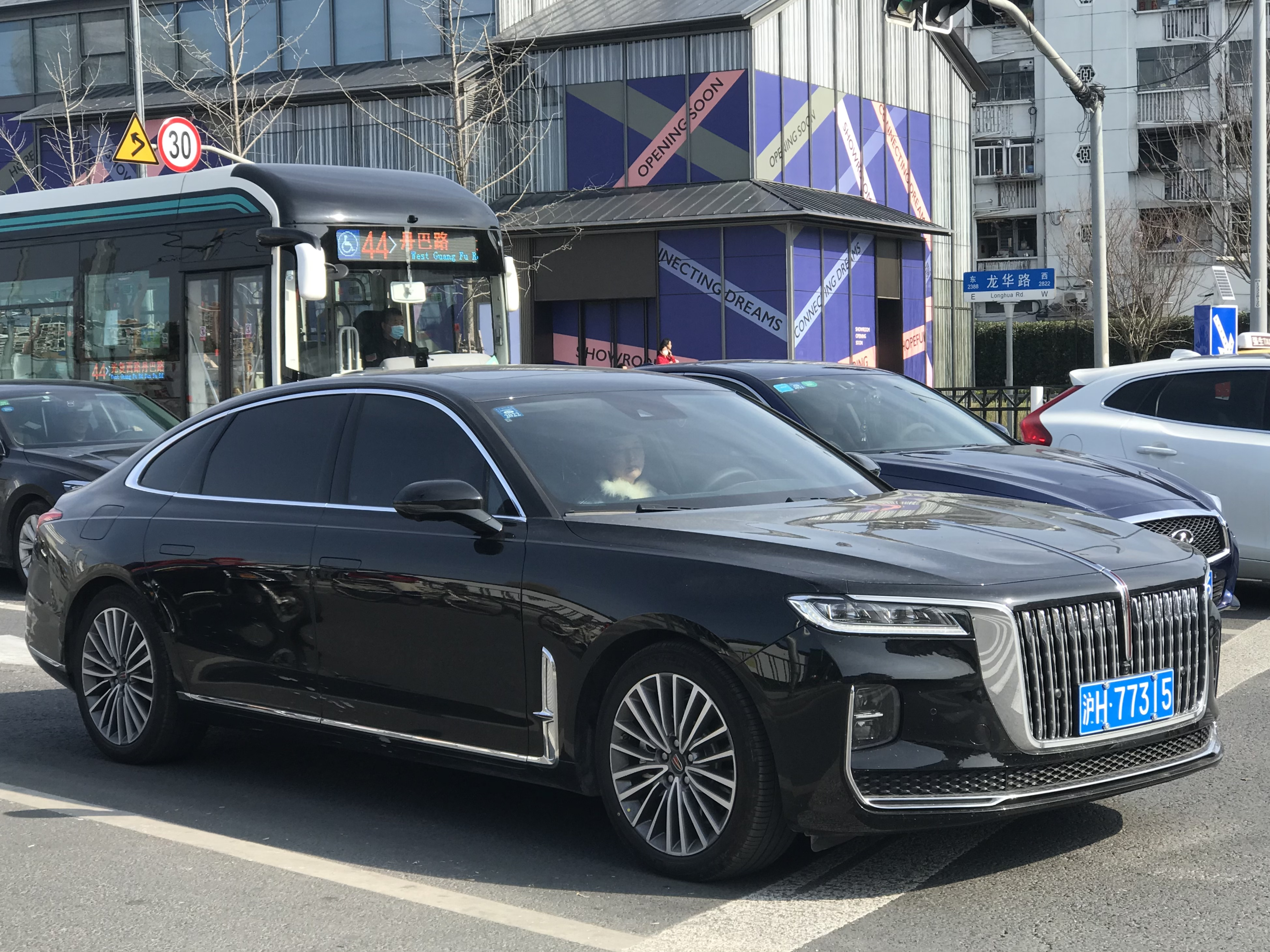

Overview
- Manufacturer: Hongqi (FAW Group)
- Production: 2020–present

Body and chassis
- Class: Full-size luxury car (F)
- Body style: 4-door sedan

The Hongqi H9 is a full-size luxury sedan produced by Chinese automobile manufacturer Hongqi, a subsidiary of FAW Group.

== First generation (2020–present) ==
First generation
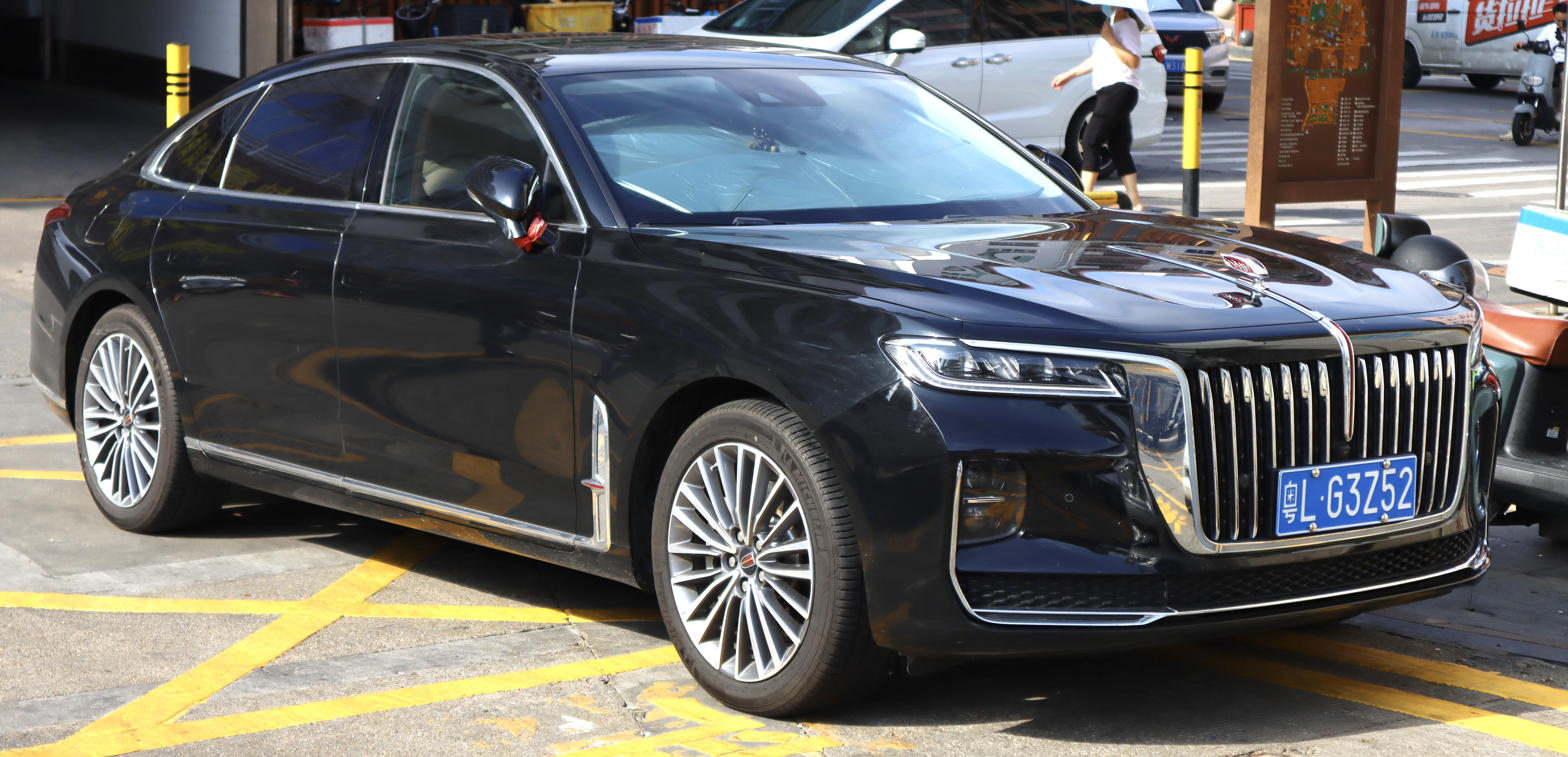

Overview
- Also called: Senat 900
- Production: 2020–present
- Assembly: China: Changchun, Jilin
- Designer: Yangfeng Ding

Body and chassis
- Class: Full-size luxury car (F)
- Body style: 4-door sedan
- Layout: FR layout F4 layout (2024–present)
- Related: Audi A6L

Powertrain
- Engine: Petrol: 2.0 L CA4GC20TD-31 I4 turbo; 2.0 L CA4GC20TD-38 I4 turbo; 3.0 L CA6GV30TD-03 V6 supercharged (2020–2024); 3.0 L CA6GV30TD-05 V6 supercharged (2024–present)
- Electric motor: Belt-Driven Starter Generator
- Power output: 180–240 kW (245–326 PS; 241–322 hp)
- Transmission: 7-speed DCT; 8-speed automatic
- Hybrid drivetrain: MHEV (2.0T)

Dimensions
- Wheelbase: 3,060 mm (120.5 in) (H9); 3,290 mm (129.5 in) (H9+)
- Length: 5,137 mm (202.2 in) (H9); 5,337 mm (210.1 in) (H9+)
- Width: 1,904 mm (75.0 in)
- Height: 1,493 mm (58.8 in)
- Curb weight: 1,875–2,100 kg (4,134–4,630 lb)

The car was originally developed as a successor to the Hongqi H7, but eventually turned out to be a more upmarket vehicle. The car is based on the 2012 Audi A6L. The H9 was presented in January 2020 in Beijing Great Hall of the People. It has been on the Chinese market since August 2020. A stretched version of the H9, the H9+, was released in 2021. It can be distinguished from the normal H9 by a larger & Chromed B-pillar.

The H9 is powered either by a two-liter turbocharged gasoline engine plus a 48V mild hybrid system with 185 kW (252 hp) or a three-liter supercharged gasoline engine with 208 kW (283 hp). Both variants have rear-wheel drive and a 7-speed dual clutch transmission.

The vehicle was launched in the United Arab Emirates in December 2020.

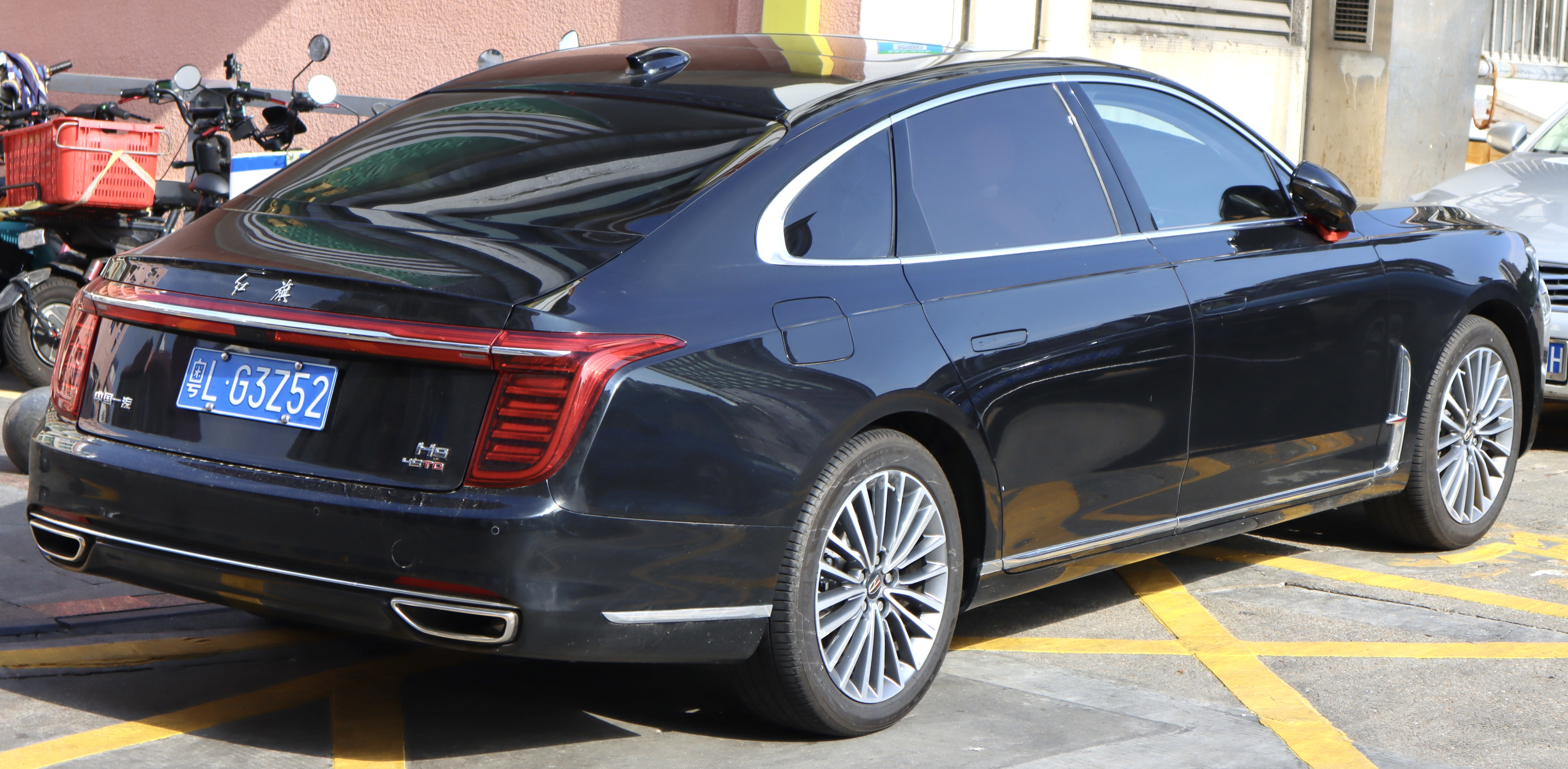
Rear view

=== 2024 facelift ===
On 25 April 2024, the H9 facelift was launched in China during Auto China 2024. The 3.0 supercharged gasoline engine variant was upgraded to 248 kW (333 hp), and its 7-speed dual-clutch transmission was replaced by an 8-speed automatic transmission.

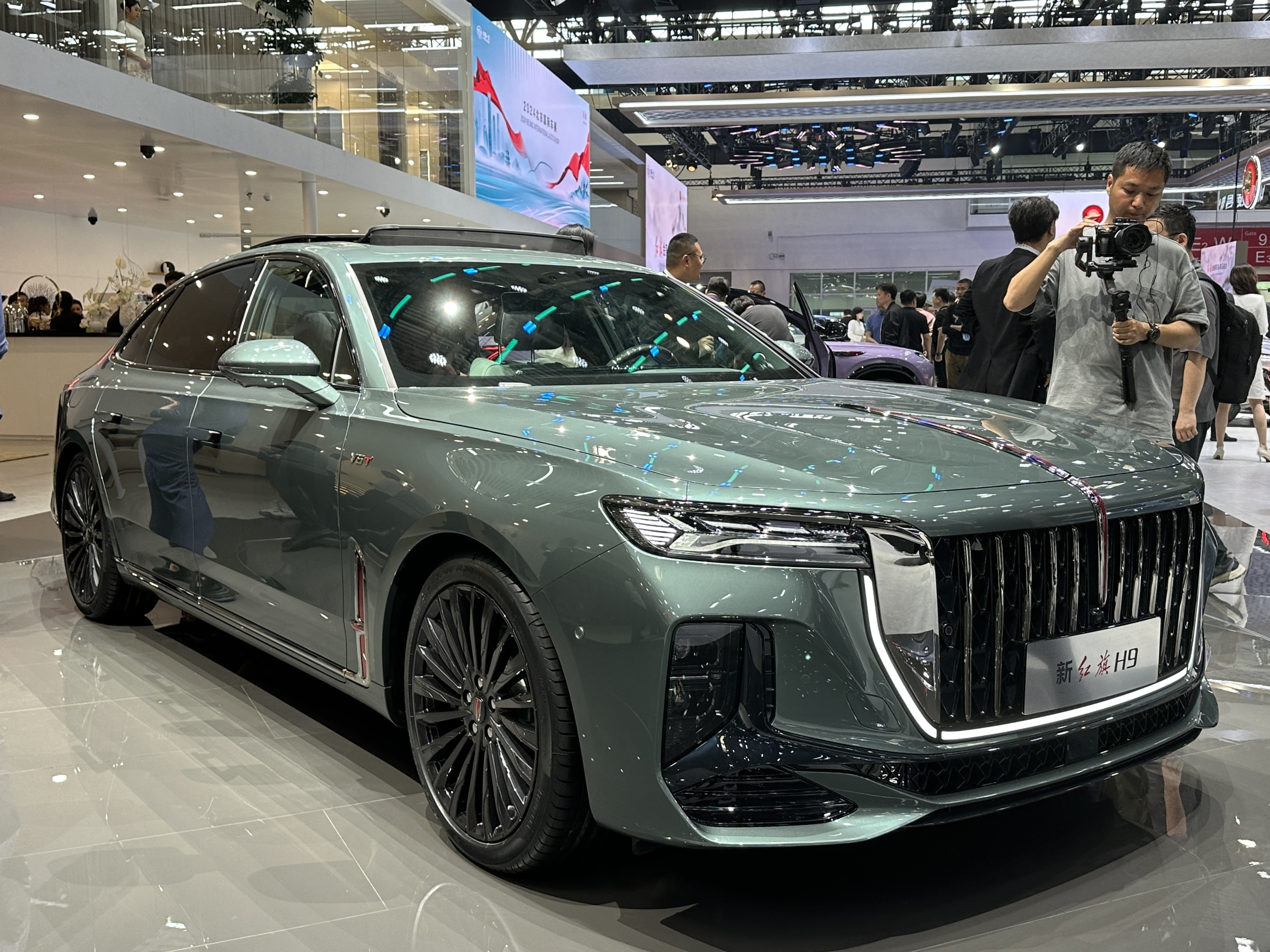
Hongqi H9 (facelift)

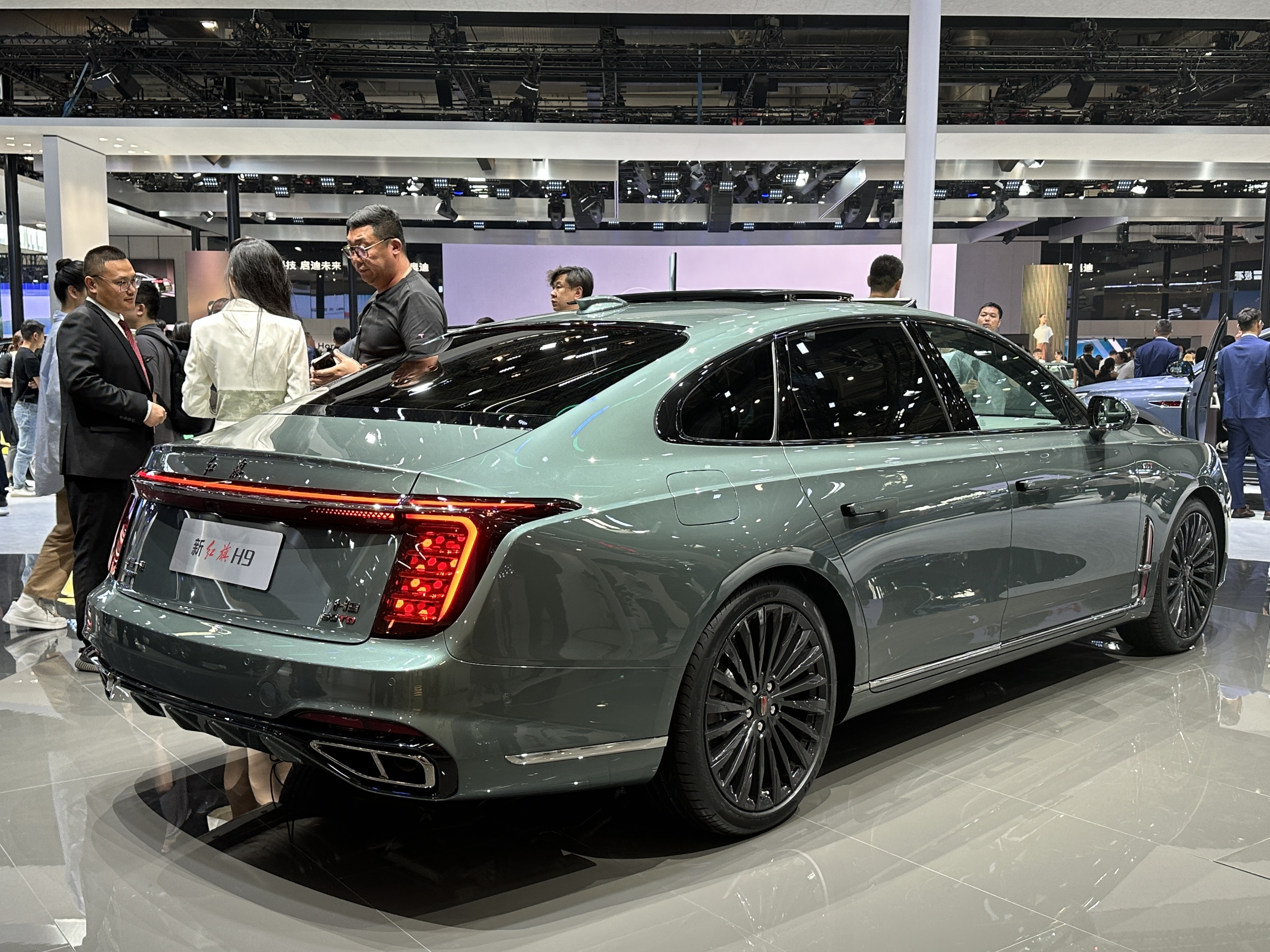
Rear view

=== Powertrain ===
Specifications
Engine		Power		Torque	Transmission	0–100 km/h (62 mph)	Top speed
Type	Code	Net	Gross	Torque	Transmission	0–100 km/h (62 mph)	Top speed
1,989 cc (2.0 L) turbo I4	CA4GC20TD-31	242 hp (180 kW; 245 PS)	248 hp (185 kW; 251 PS) @5,500 rpm	380 N⋅m (280 lb⋅ft) @1,800–4,000 rpm	7-speed wet-clutch DCT + 48V MHEV	7.8 s	230 km/h (143 mph)
1,989 cc (2.0 L) turbo I4	CA4GC20TD-38	242 hp (180 kW; 245 PS)	248 hp (185 kW; 251 PS) @5,500 rpm	380 N⋅m (280 lb⋅ft) @1,800–4,000 rpm	8-speed automatic + 48V MHEV	7.8 s	230 km/h (143 mph)
2,951 cc (3.0 L) supercharged V6	CA6GV30TD-07	268 hp (200 kW; 272 PS) @4,780–5,500 rpm	279 hp (208 kW; 283 PS)	400 N⋅m (295 lb⋅ft) @2,500–4,780 rpm	7-speed wet-clutch DCT	7.1 s	245 km/h (152 mph)
2,951 cc (3.0 L) supercharged V6	CA6GV30TD-05	322 hp (240 kW; 326 PS)	332 hp (248 kW; 337 PS)	445 N⋅m (328 lb⋅ft)	8-speed automatic, part-time AWD	6.5 s	245 km/h (152 mph)

== Hongqi H9+ ==
The Hongqi H9+ was unveiled at the Auto China 2020. The H9+ body length is 5.34 meters and the wheelbase is 3290 mm. Compared with the H9, the wheelbase is 230 mm longer. On 10 May 2022, the Hongqi H9+ was launched.

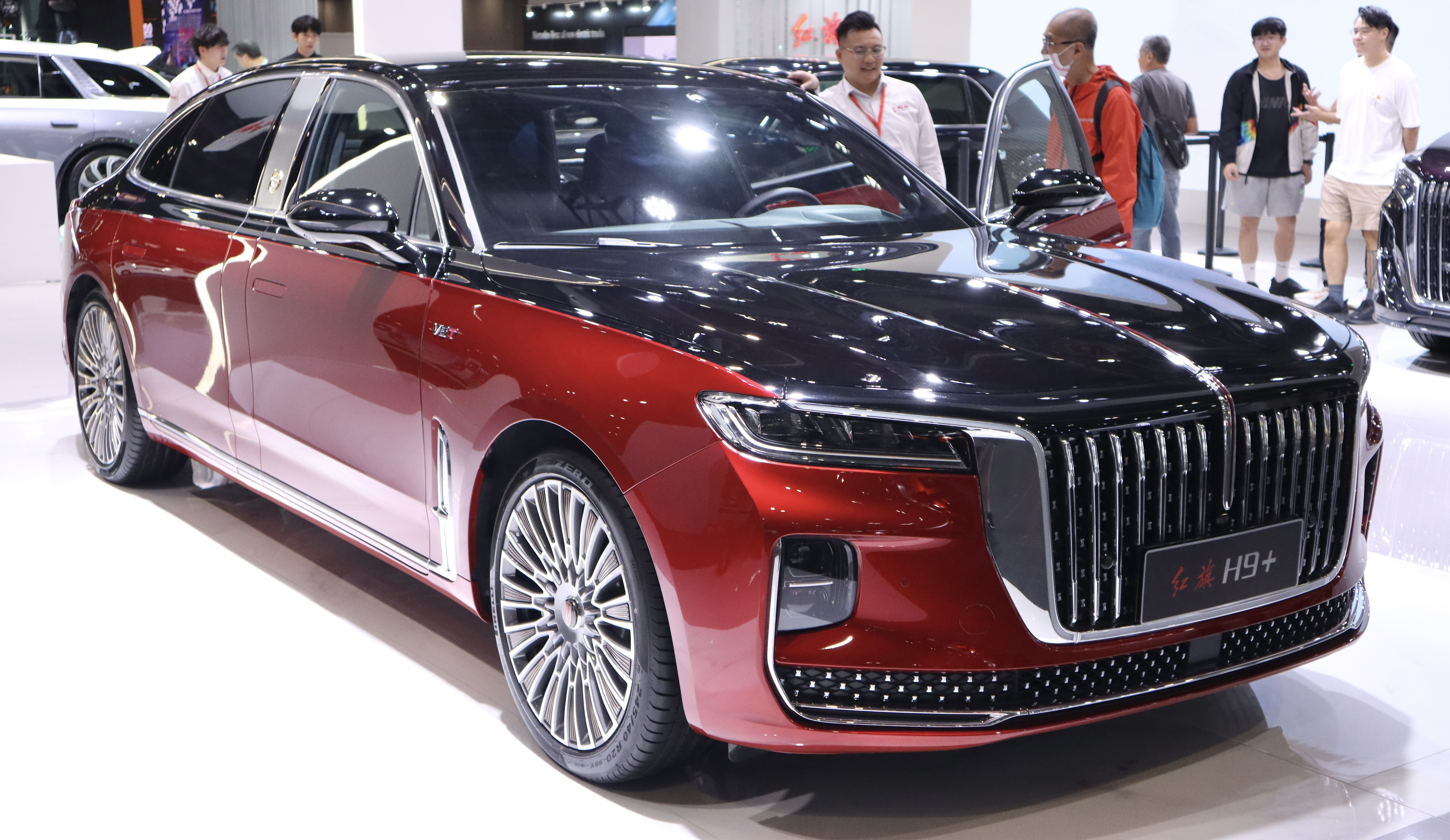
Hongqi H9+

== Second generation (2026) ==
Second generation

Overview
- Production: 2026 (to commence)
- Assembly: China: Changchun, Jilin

Body and chassis
- Class: Full-size luxury car (F)
- Body style: 4-door sedan

Powertrain
- Engine: Petrol: 2.0 L CA4GC20TDH-41 turbo I4
- Transmission: 2-speed DHT
- Hybrid drivetrain: Series-parallel plug-in hybrid
- Battery: 40.4 kWh
- Electric range: 216 km (134 mi) (WLTP); 275 km (171 mi) (CLTC)

Dimensions
- Wheelbase: 3,120 mm (122.8 in)
- Length: 5,230 mm (205.9 in)
- Width: 1,955 mm (77.0 in)
- Height: 1,515 mm (59.6 in)
- Curb weight: 2,320 kg (5,115 lb)

The H9 has double wishbone front and trapezoidal arm independent rear suspension geometries, and is equipped with closed air suspension system with 65 mm (2.6 in) of ride height adjustment and adaptive dampers which can use ADAS sensor data to prepare the suspension. It is also equipped with ±16° of rear-wheel steering for a turning radius of 5.35 m (17.6 ft).

The interior features Huawei's HarmonySpace cockpit system, with a 12.3-inch digital instrument cluster, a 16.1-inch 3K-resolution central infotainment touchscreen running HarmonyOS software, and 12.3-inch passenger entertainment display. It has a 25-speaker Huawei Sound audio system.

The H9 features Huawei's Qiankun ADS 5 ADAS system, with a sensor suite consisting of one 896-line roof-mounted LiDAR, an array of 3 mmWave radars, 11 cameras, and 12 ultrasonic sensors, and is capable of Level 2 supervised autonomous driving in highway and urban conditions.

The H9 will be offered with a plug-in hybrid powertrain. It uses a longitudinally-mounted 2.0-liter turbocharged engine outputting 188 hp (140 kW; 191 PS) (194 hp (145 kW; 197 PS) gross) paired with a 2-speed DHT transmission with dual electric motors. It has a 40.4kWh battery pack and 800-volt architecture providing 216 kilometres (134 mi) of WLTP electric range and a combined CLTC range rating exceeding 1,400 kilometres (870 mi).

== Sales ==
Year	China
2023	14,114
2024	6,229
2025	8,113
