= Aurus Senat =

Russian luxury automobile

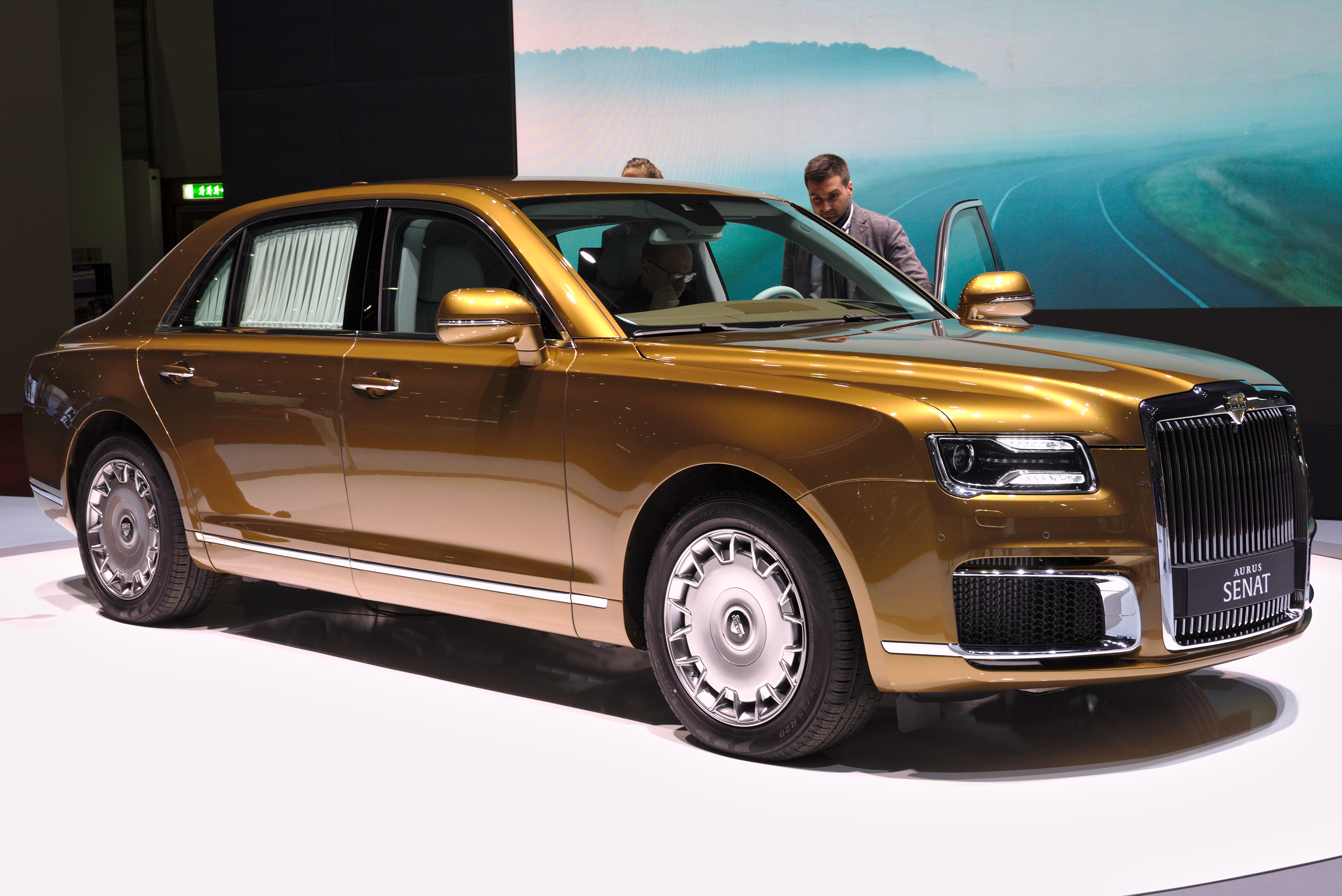

Overview
- Manufacturer: Aurus Motors
- Production: September 2018 – mid-2020; May 2021 – present (120 units annually)
- Model years: 2021–present
- Assembly: Russia: Yelabuga (Sollers JSC); Moscow (NAMI); Saint Petersburg; United Arab Emirates: Abu Dhabi (Tawazun Holding)
- Designer: Mike Robinson

Body and chassis
- Class: Full-size luxury car
- Body style: 4-door sedan; 2-door convertible; 4-door armoured limousine
- Layout: Longitudinal front-engine, four-wheel drive

Powertrain
- Engine: 4.4 L NAMI/Porsche Engineering developed V8 (twin-turbo, petrol)
- Electric motor: SEGZ, 62 hp (63 PS; 46 kW)
- Power output: 590 hp (598 PS; 440 kW)
- Transmission: 9-speed KATE R932 automatic
- Hybrid drivetrain: HEV (Hybrid Electric Vehicle)

Dimensions
- Wheelbase: 3,300 mm (129.9 in)
- Length: 5,630 mm (221.7 in) (normal version); 6,620 mm (260.6 in) (long / limousine version)
- Width: 2,020 mm (79.5 in)
- Height: 1,695 mm (66.7 in)
- Curb weight: 2,700 kg (5,952 lb) (normal sedan); 6,200 kg (13,669 lb) (head of Russia level armoured limo)

Chronology
- Predecessor: ZIL-41047 (spiritual)

The Aurus Senat (Russian: Aypyc Сенат) is a luxury full-size car by Russian automaker Aurus Motors and developed by NAMI in Moscow, Russia. It is the presidential state car of Russia under Vladimir Putin. The Aurus Senat is claimed to be retro-styled after the ZIS-110, a Soviet limousine introduced in 1945 but the design has also been seen as closely resembling Rolls Royce models such as the Phantom and Ghost.

== History ==
The first known use of the Senat was during Russian president Vladimir Putin's 2018 presidential inauguration. The Senat was shown publicly at the Moscow International Automobile Salon in September 2018. Cars of the Kortezh series (also known in Russian: Единая модульная платформа, ЕМП, lit. 'Unified Modular Platform') were expected to be available for export to the Middle East and China in late 2018. A civilian version of the Senat is manufactured by a joint venture between the NAMI and LiAZ firms. Expected retail prices were increased in 2018 to 10 million rubles ($US160,000), but in 2021, still before the first deliveries, became higher than 20 million rubles (~$US300,000). The Aurus Senat is part of the Kortezh series, which will eventually include a van and an SUV.

In June 2022, Turkmenistan purchased a Senat for use by Serdar Berdimuhamedov.

On February 20, 2024, it was reported that Kim Jong Un received a Senat as a gift from President Vladimir Putin, which South Korea says is against UN sanctions on providing certain vehicles including luxury cars. In mid March 2024, North Korean television released footage appearing to show Kim Jong Un using the car to attend a military event. On June 19, 2024, Putin gave Kim another Senat as a gift.

On May 10, 2026, Putin gave Yang di-Pertuan Agong of Malaysia, Sultan Ibrahim another Aurus Senat as a gift in conjunction with the 81st anniversary of Victory Day celebrations in Moscow.

By the end of 2024, only 250 cars had been built. The weak demand and high production costs caused Aurus to announce that the Yelabuga, Tatarstan assembly plant will close by the end of 2026. The new Aurus 900 will be based on the Chinese Hongqi H9.

== Design ==
Development of the Senat began in 2013 with production, in civilian S600 or official L700 versions, beginning in 2021 at the Sollers JSC factory in Yelabuga. Porsche and Bosch helped develop the engine.

== Versions ==
The armoured limousine version is powered by a 4.4-litre V8 engine developed by NAMI, with a 6.6-litre V12 (634 kW [850 hp; 862 PS]) becoming available at a later date.

The vehicle got a facelift in 2024.

== Gallery ==
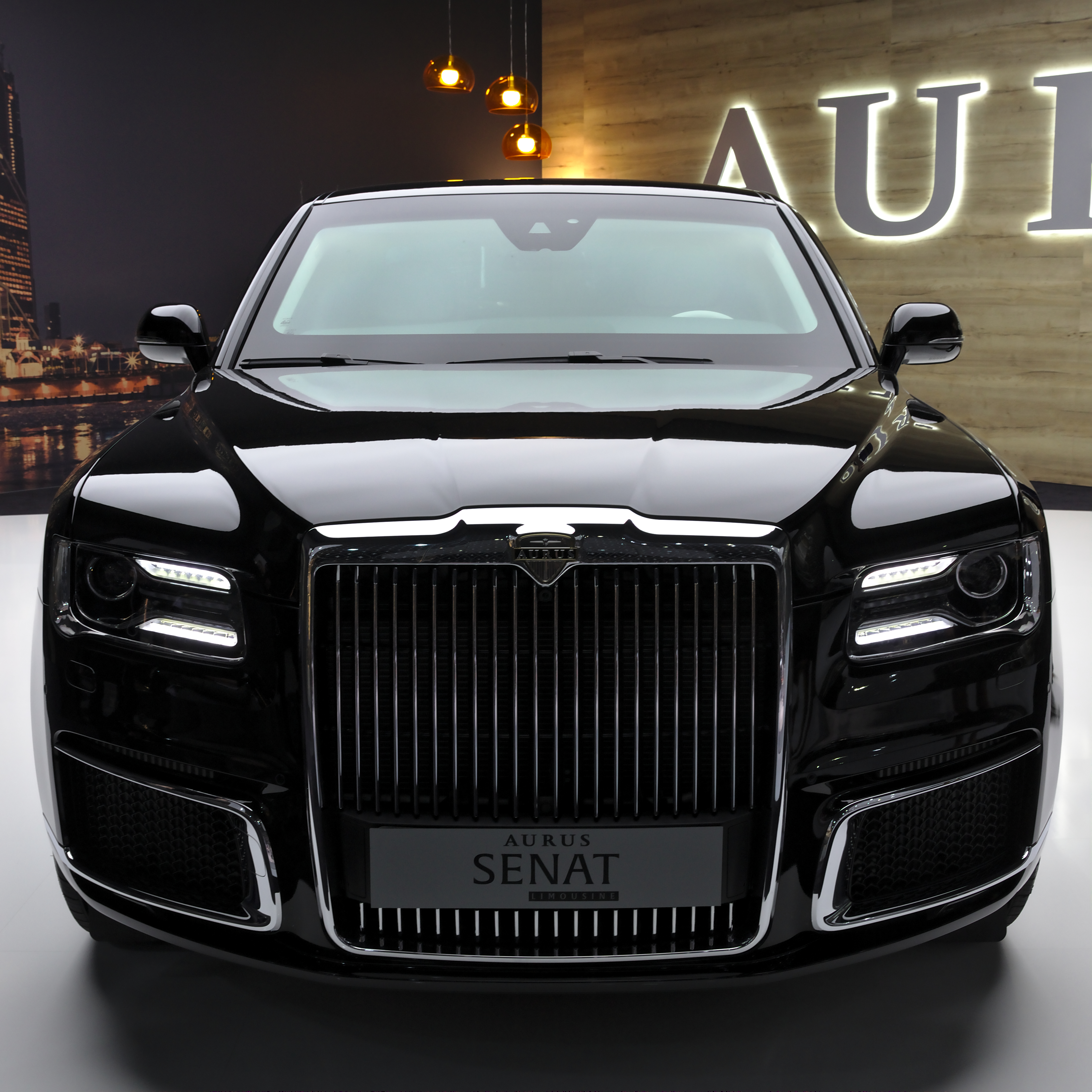
Front view

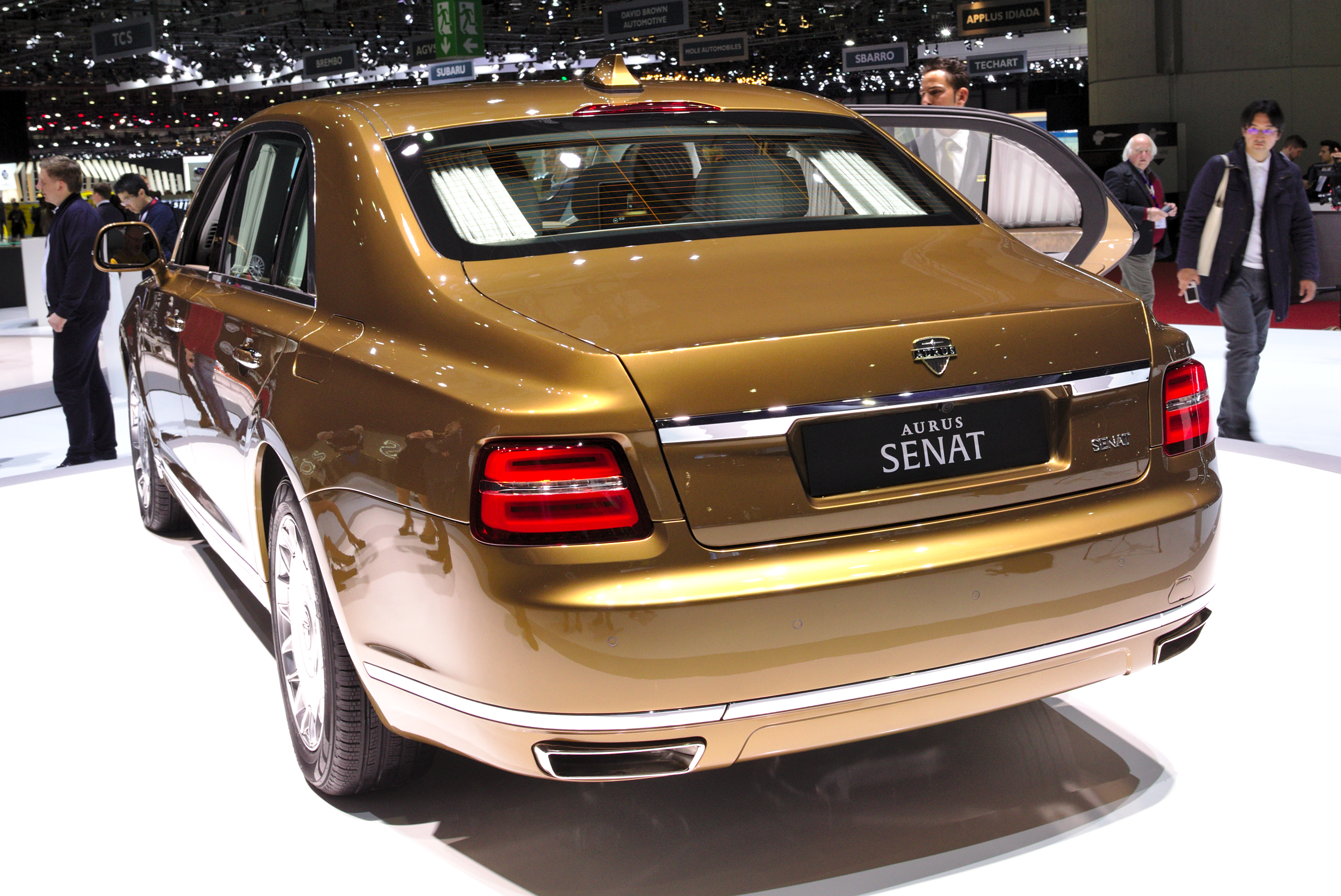
Rear view

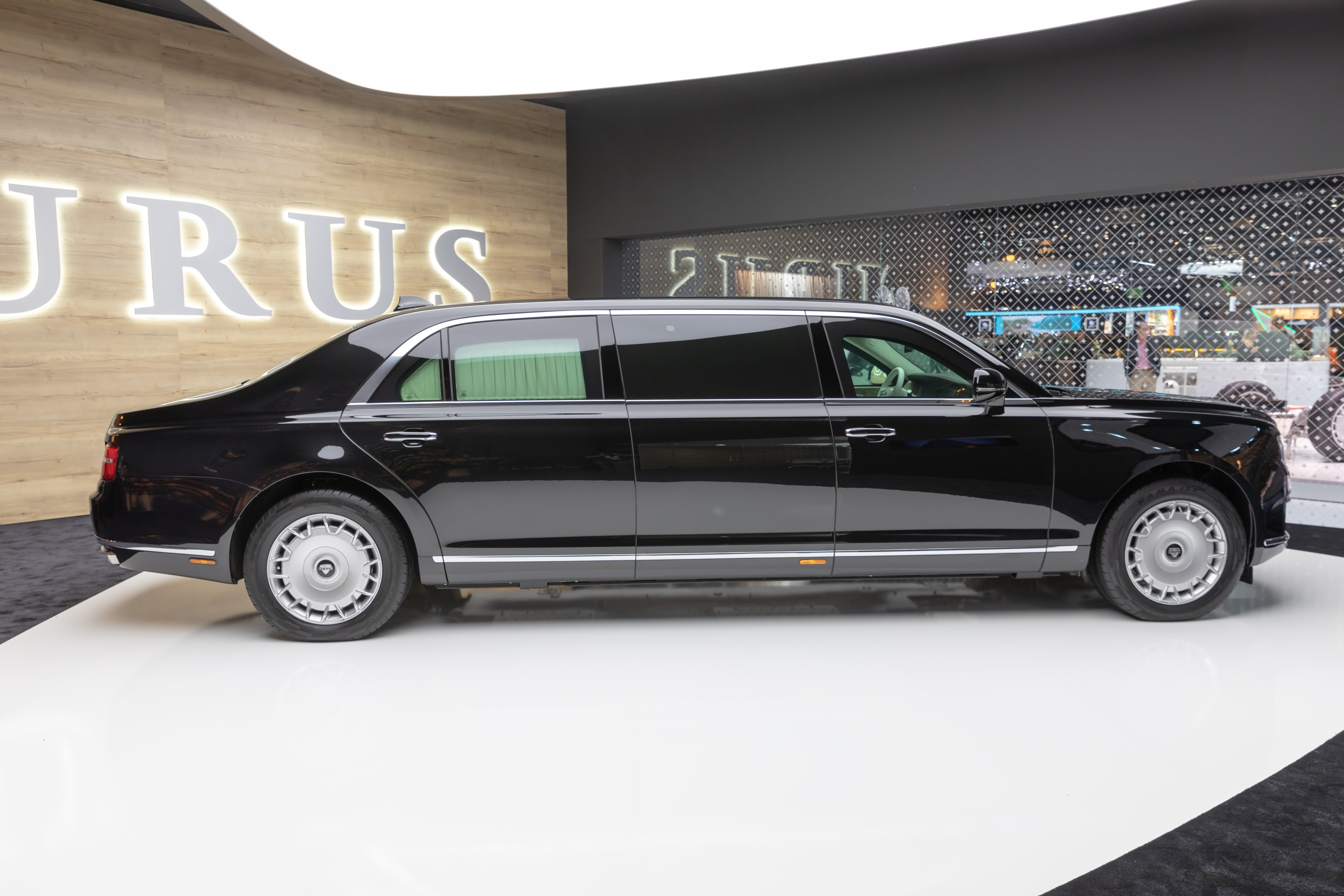
Aurus Senat limousine

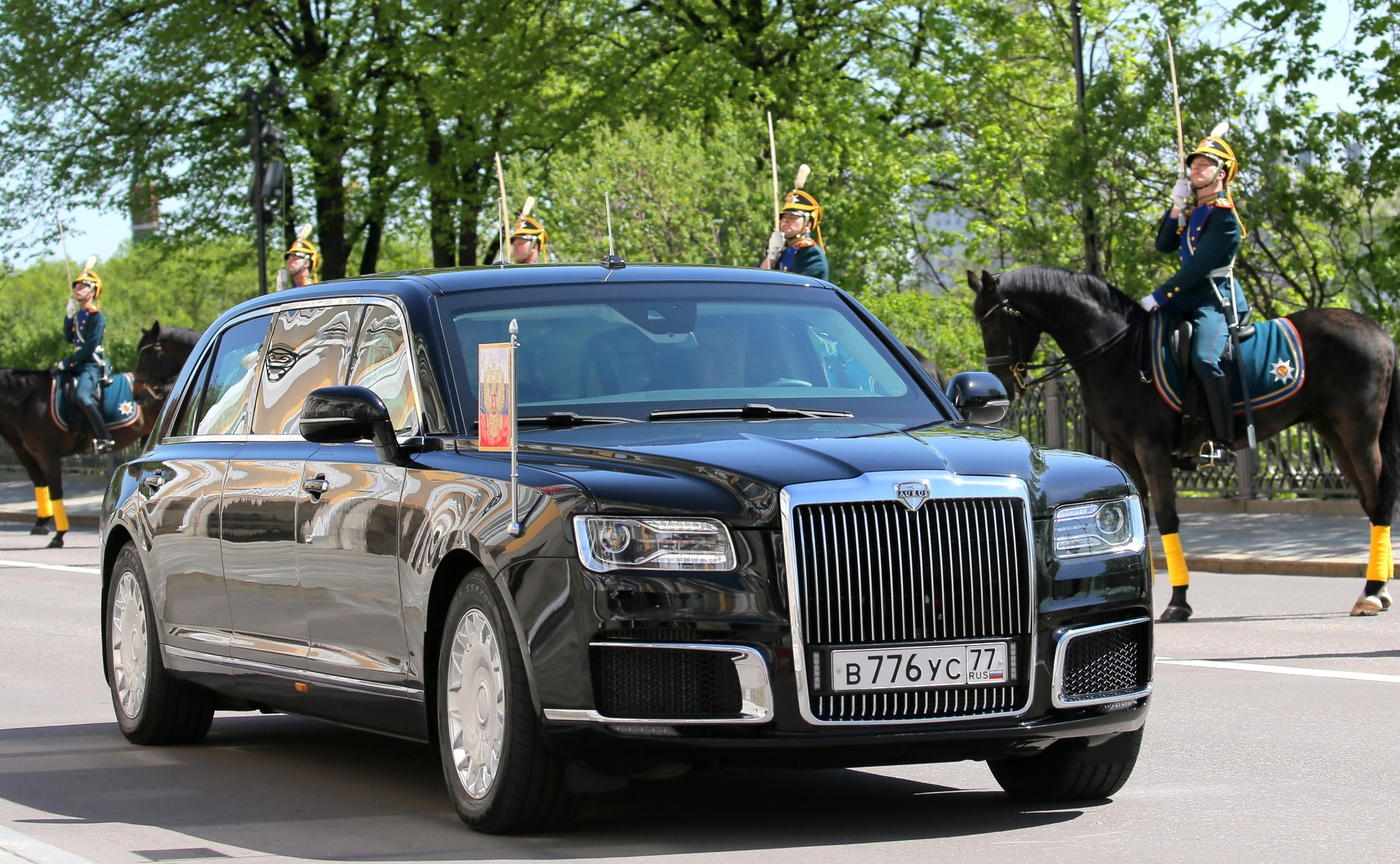
Russian state limousine (May 7, 2018)

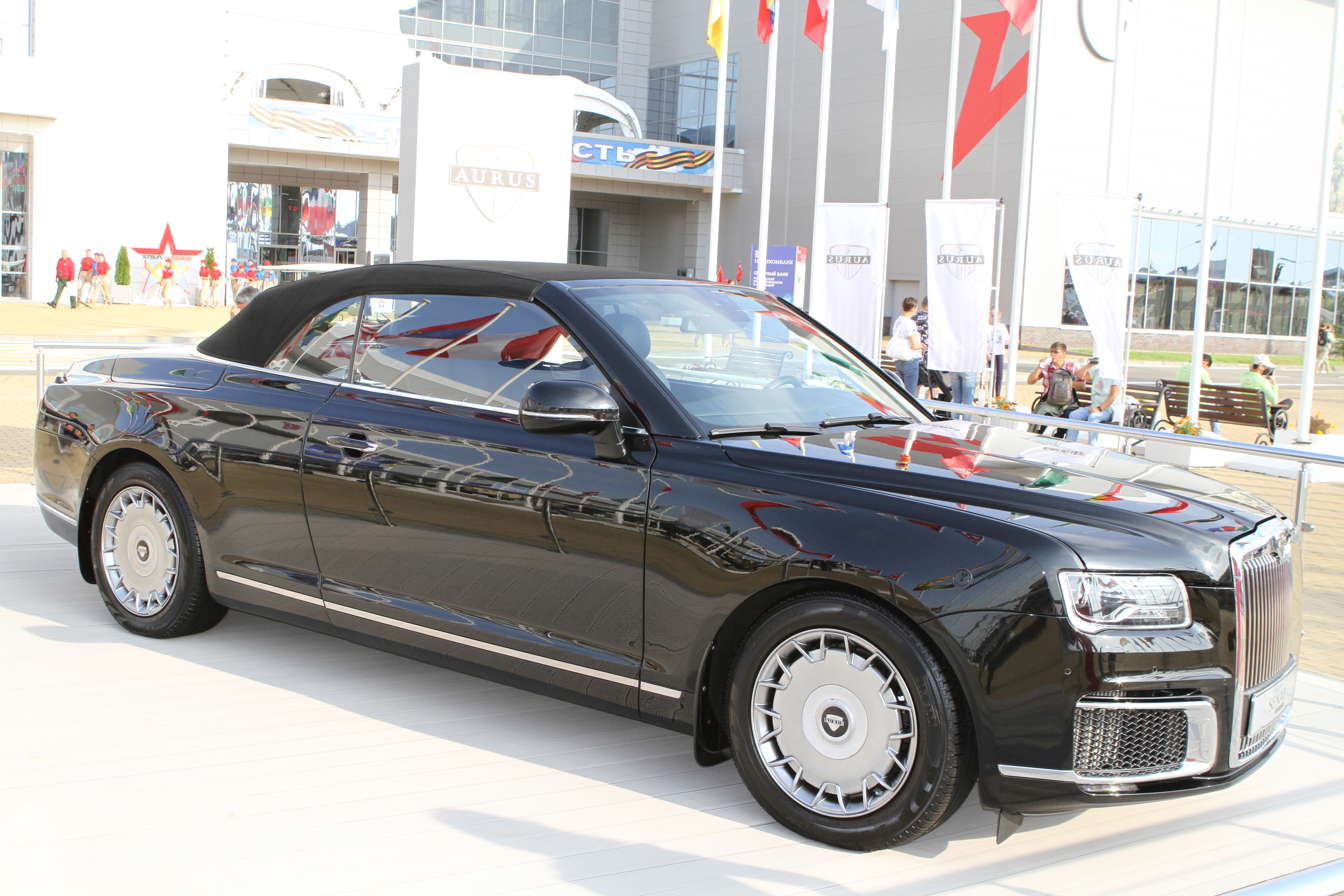
Aurus Senat cabriolet

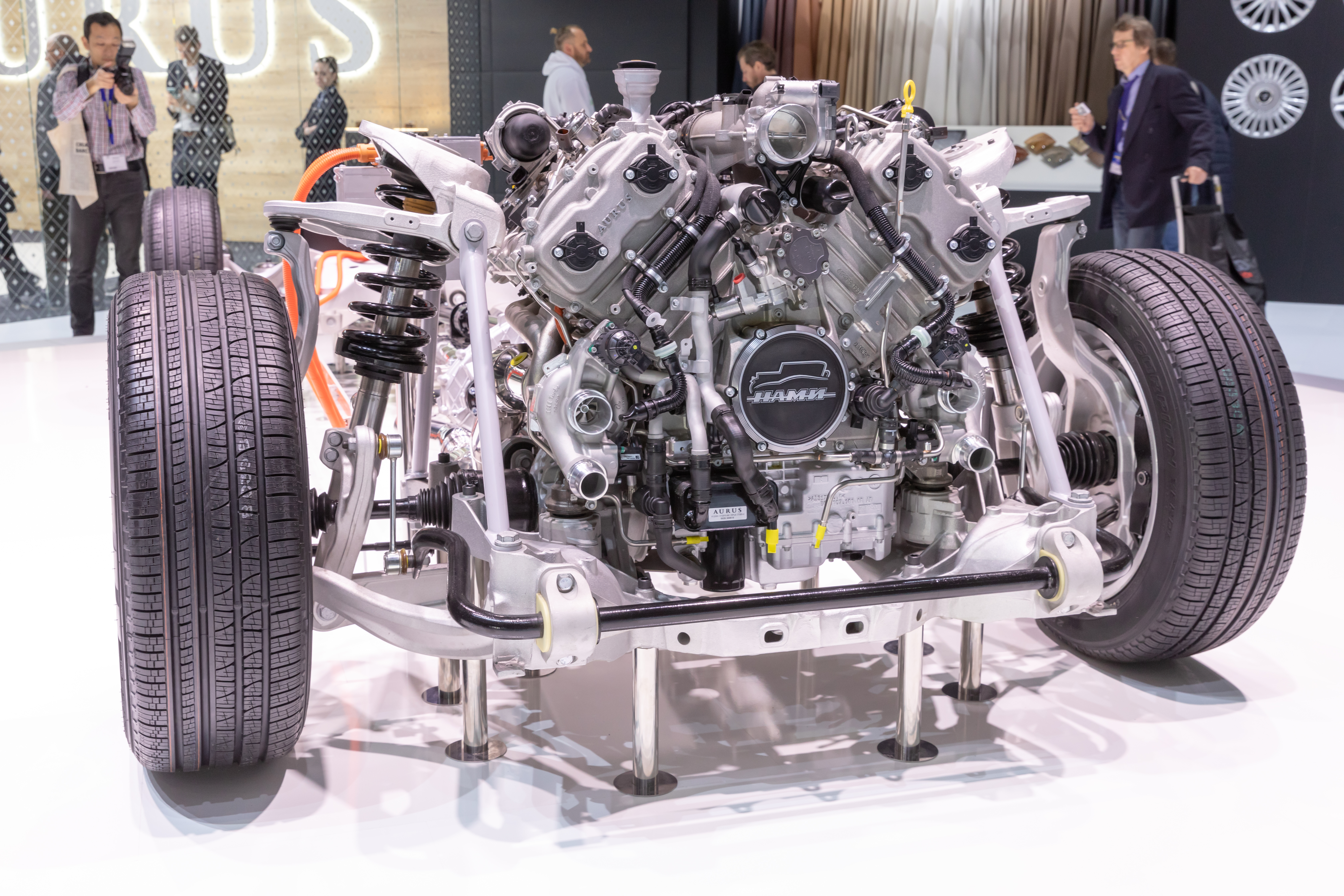
Engine

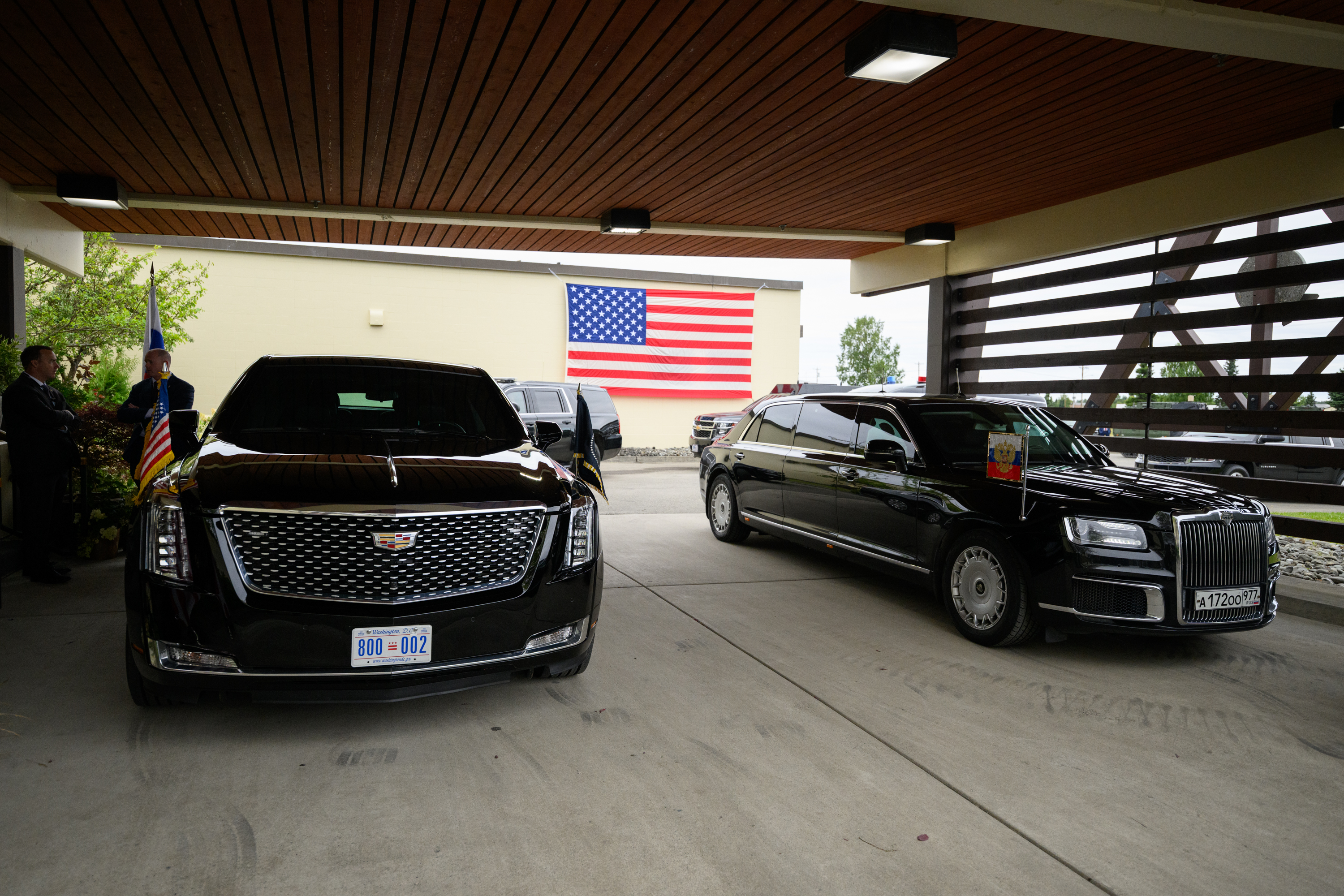
Next to the 2018 Cadillac One of the President of the United States, during the Russian President's visit to Alaska on August 15, 2025

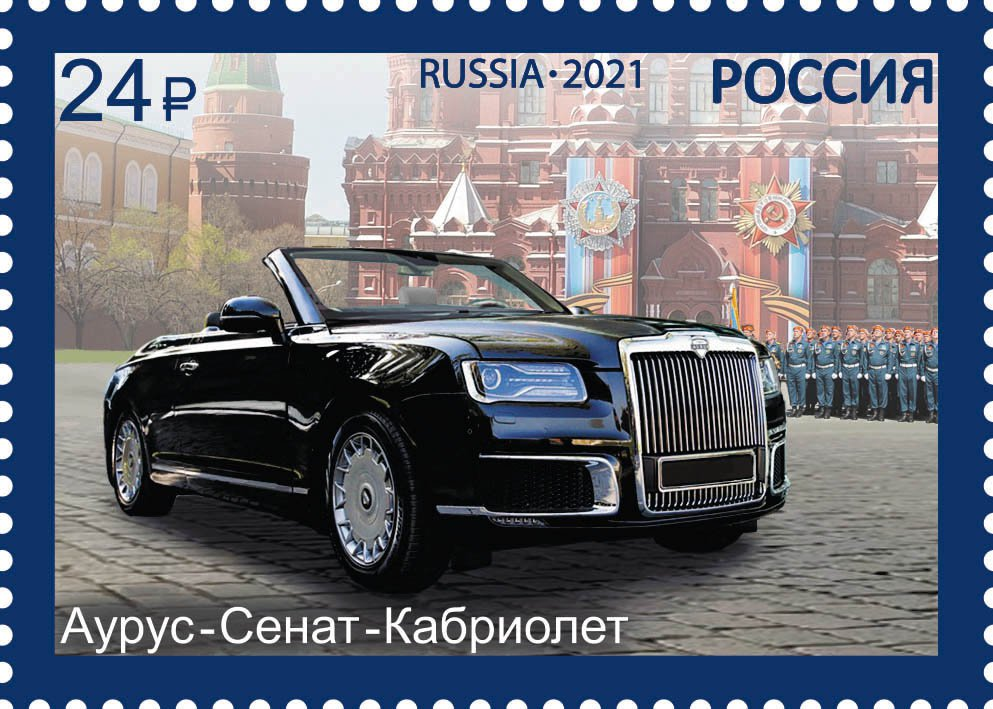
Aurus Senat Cabriolet (stamp)
