= NAMI (automotive institute) =

Russian automotive institute

State Scientific Centre of the Russian Federation: Federal State Unitary Enterprise ‘Central Scientific Research Institute of Automobiles and Motor Engines “NAMI”’
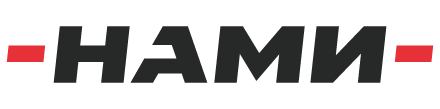
- Trade name: NAMI
- Native name: Государственный научный центр Российской Федерации Федеральное государственное унитарное предприятие «Центра́льный нау́чно-иссле́довательский автомоби́льный и автомото́рный институ́т „НАМИ“»
- Romanized name: Gosudarstvenny nauchny tsentr Rossiyskoy Federatsii Federal'noye gosudarstvennoye unitarnoye predpriyatiye "Tsentral'ny nauchno-issledovatel'skiy avtomobil'ny i avtomotorny institut 'NAMI'"
- Formerly: Scientific Automotive and Tractor Institute, a.k.a. NATI (1931–1946)
- Type: Federal State Unitary Enterprise
- Industry: Automotive
- Founded: 1918; 108 years ago
- Headquarters: Moscow, Russia
- Revenue: $32.3 million (2017)
- Operating income: −$35.3 million (2017)
- Net income: $352,143 (2017)
- Total assets: $293 million (2017)
- Total equity: $16.6 million (2017)
- Website: nami.ru

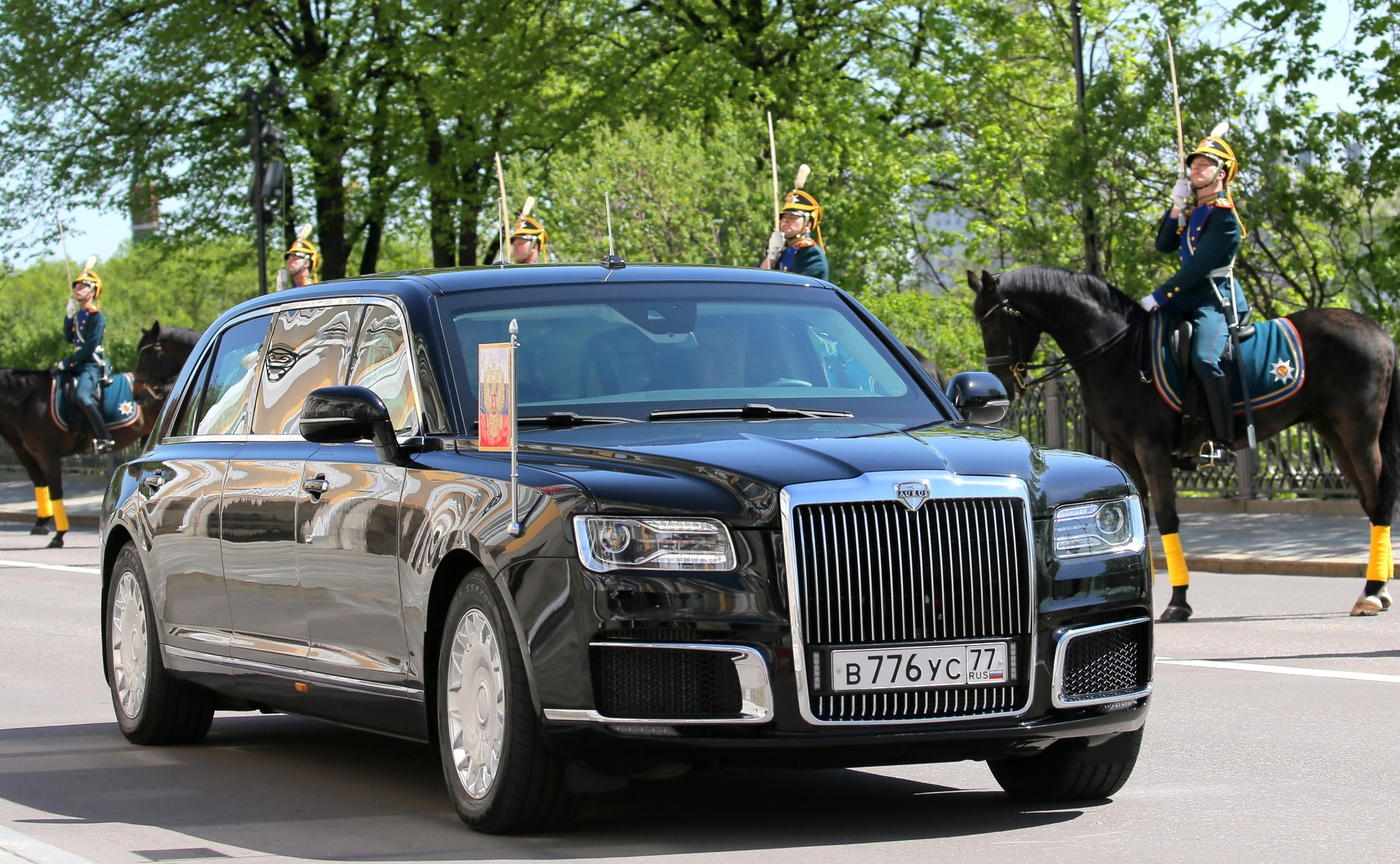
Vladimir Putin riding in the NAMI-developed Aurus Senat for his 2018 swearing-in ceremony

The Central Scientific Research Institute of Automobile and Motor Engines, abbreviated as NAMI, (Note: Russian: Государственный научный центр Российской Федерации Федеральное государственное унитарное предприятие «Центральный научно-исследовательский автомобильный и автомоторный институт „НАМИ“» (ГНЦ РФ ФГУП «НАМИ»), romanized: Gosudarstvenny nauchny tsentr Rossiyskoy Federatsii Federal'noye gosudarstvennoye unitarnoye predpriyatiye "Tsentral'ny nauchno-issledovatel'skiy avtomobil'ny i avtomotorny institut 'NAMI'" (GNTs RF FGUP "NAMI").) is a Russian automotive technology development company.

== History ==
The Scientific Automotive Engines Institute (Russian: Научный автомоторный институт, abbr. НАМИ, NAMI) was established on 14 March 1920, based on the Scientific Automobile Laboratory (Russian: Научная автомобильная лаборатория, abbr. НАЛ, NAL). The laboratory was part of the Scientific and Technical Department of the VSNKh, which was established on 16 October 1918. Starting in 1924, the institute allowed purchases of foreign automobiles and automobile accessories. In 1927 the institute developed its first automobile, the NAMI-1, which also became the first car of the Soviet Union.

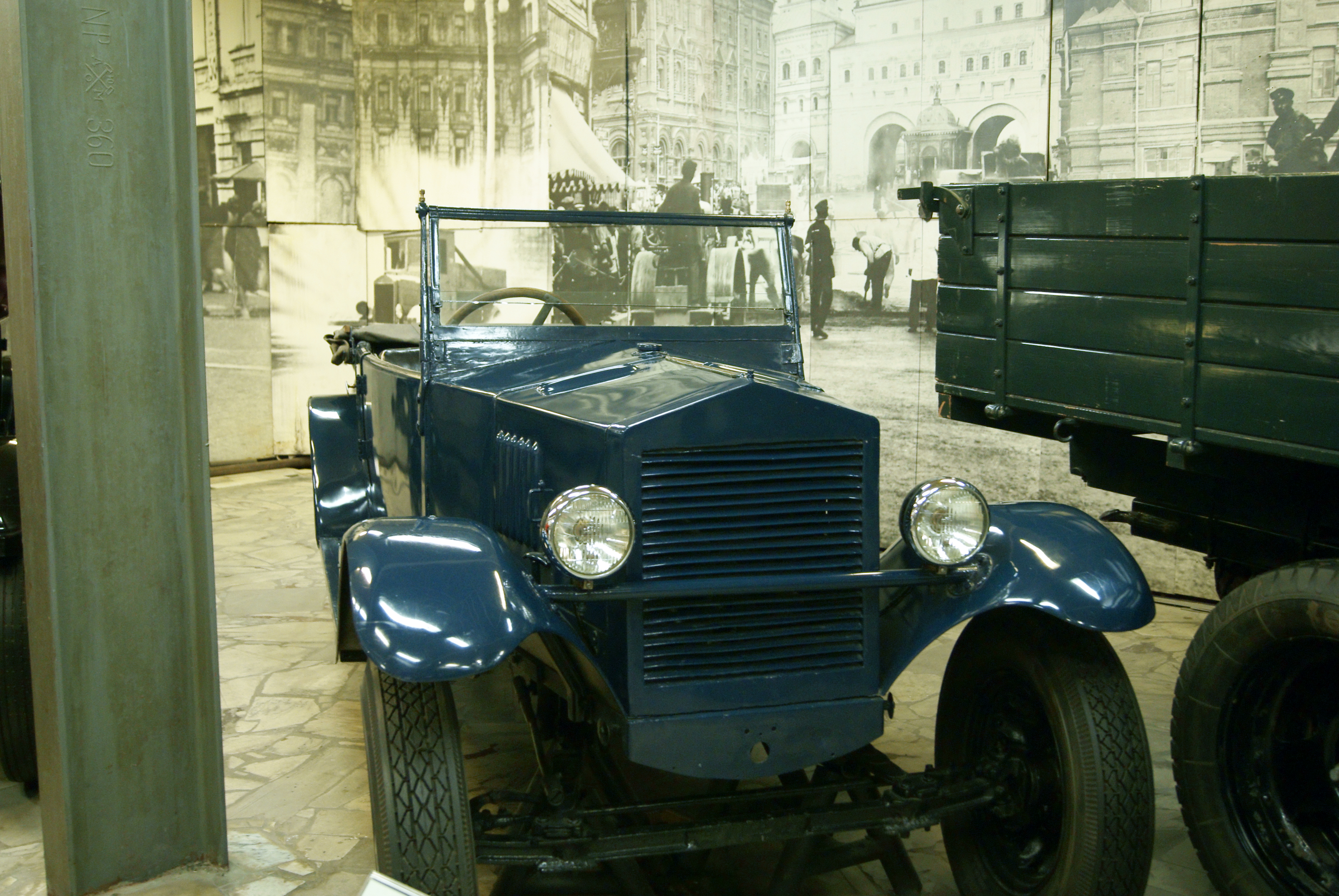
NAMI-1 car

During the 1930s, the institute became the main department for development in the Soviet automotive industry. They later developed and produced the first Soviet trolleybuses, and created tractor and lorry models and. They also developed half-tracks and armored vehicles for the Red Army.

From 1931 to 1946 the institute was named the Scientific Automotive and Tractor Institute (Russian: Научный автотракторный институт, abbr. НАТИ, NATI)

NATI was awarded the Order of the Red Banner of Labour in 1940.

Early in 1946, NATI underwent a split, and the tractor division was transferred to be under the supervision of the Ministry of Agricultural Machinery. The automobile branch was kept under the supervision of the Ministry of Automobile Industry and was renamed the Scientific Research Automobile and Automotive Engines Institute (Russian: Научно-исследовательский автомобильный и автомоторный институт, abbr. НАМИ, NAMI). The tractor division later served as a basis for the Scientific Research Tractor Institute (Russian: Научно-исследовательский тракторный институт, abbr. НАТИ, NATI).

Experimental and prototype engines were developed at the institute, some of which served as the basis for later mass production. In the 1960s, NAMI developed some front-wheel drive and automatic transmissions, but these concepts didn't make it to production until much later, as they were deemed too expensive and complex for the state of the industry at that time. For example, they developed the GAZ-21 automatic transmission, for which the service infrastructure was virtually non-existent.

=== Post-Soviet era ===
In 2014 the NAMI purchased the Yo-Mobile project for 1 Euro.

In 2021, NAMI was involved in the design process the Aurus Senat car line, and developed a hydrogen powered model. A laboratory model was presented at its plant in Tatarstan in central Russia.

In May 2022, NAMI acquired Renault's controlling stake (about 68%) in the Russian car manufacturer AvtoVAZ.

== Testing facility ==
In the 1960s the testing facility of NAMI (Russian: Научный испытательный центр автомобильной и мотоциклетной техники, abbr. НИЦИАМТ) was opened.

== Prototypes ==
The 1920s and 1930s was the only period when NAMI was involved in vehicle production. Since then NAMI has only developed prototypes and concept cars.

- 1920 – BK – aerosan
- 1921 – Tri-Ka – aerosan
- 1927-1931 – NAMI-1, the first Soviet passenger car
- 1928 – NAMI-1 – snowmobile
- 1929 – Ford-A-NAMI - (also known as Ford Model K)
- 1930 – NATI "Kar-a-Pet"
- 1931 – NAMI-IX, aerosledge
- 1932 – NATI-2 – half-track based on the GAZ-AA
- 1932 – Ford-NATI-5 (also known as NATI-5) – half-track based on Ford-A
- 1932 – Ford-NATI-30 (also known as GAZ-NATI-30) – prototype for GAZ-AAA
- 1933 – NATI-3 – half-track based on the GAZ-AA
- 1933 – NATI LK-1
- 1934 – GAZ-A-NATI (also known as GAZ-A Kegress) – half-track based on GAZ-A
- 1934 – NATI LK-2
- 1934 – NATI-V – based on the GAZ-AA
- 1935 – NATI-YaG-10
- 1936 – NATI-V-3 (later NATI-VG) – half-track based on the GAZ-AA
- 1936 – NATI-VZ – half-track based on the ZIS-5
- 1937 – K-1 (also known as NATI-K1) – based on the ZIS-6; led to the ZIS-36
- 1937 – NATI-VM – half-track based on the GAZ-M1
- 1937 – NATI-V3 – based on the GAZ-AA
- 1938 – K-2 (also known as NATI-K2) – two-axle version of K-1; cancelled in favor of the ZIS-32
- 1938 – NATI-A, bus
- 1939 – NATI-23A – based on the ZIS-5
- 1940 – NATI-LB – based on the GAZ-62, became the LB-62
- 1941 – NATI-K2 – based on the ZIS-5, led to the ZIS-32
- 1941 – AR-NATI - the prototype for GAZ-64
- 1947 – NAMI-010 – amphibious vehicle based on the GAZ-63
- 1948 – Pobeda-NAMI – prototype improved version of GAZ-M20
- 1948 – NAMI-LAZ-750/NAMI-LAZ-751
- 1948 – NAMI-011 – based on the GAZ-67B, led to the GAZ-46
- 1949 – NAMI-012 – steam truck based on the YaAZ-200
- 1950 – NAMI-013 "Chita"
- 1951 – NAMI-015/016 – based on the ZIS-151
- 1951 – NAMI-018 – all-wheel-drive logging truck version of NAMI-012
- 1955 – IMZ-NAMI-A50 "Belka" (Squirrel) – cancelled in favor of the ZAZ-965
- 1956 – NAMI-020 – entered production as the Ural-375
- 1956 – NAMI-021 – transport version of NAMI-020; prototype for Ural-375T
- 1957 – NAMI-032G – prototype for LuAZ-967 and LuAZ-969
- 1957-1958 – NAMI-031
- 1958 – NAMI-044 – first Soviet wheeled tractor, became the KhTZ T-150K
- 1958 – NAMI-048/048A
- 1958 – NAMI-049 "Ogonyok" (Spark) – prototype for LuAZ-967
- 1958 – NAMI-055/055B – based on the Moskvitch 410
- 1958 – NAMI-058
- 1958 – NAMI-059
- 1959 – NAMI-041
- 1959 – NAMI-053 "Turbo" – based on the ZIL-127
- 1960 – NAMI-060 – cancelled in favor of the ZAZ-965
- 1960 – NAMI-074
- 1960 – NAMI S-3 – based on the Moskvitch 415
- 1961 – NAMI-032M – entered production as the LuAZ-967
- 1961 – NAMI-032S
- 1961 – NAMI-049A "Tselina"
- 1961 – NAMI-055V
- 1961 – NAMI-080
- 1961 – NAMI-0102
- 1961 – NAMI-787, trailer
- 1962 – SMZ–NAMI-086 "Sputnik"
- 1963 – NAMI-032B – prototype for ZAZ-969
- 1963 – NAMI-076 "Ermak"
- 1963 – NAMI-094 (ET-8) – based on the 1956 FWD Terracruzer
- 1964 – NAMI-058T
- 1964 – NAMI-092
- 1965 – NAMI S-4 – based on UAZ-451
- 1965 – NAMI S-3M
- 1965 – NAMI-067 (M10), hovercraft
- 1965 – NAMI-072
- 1965 – NAMI-0100
- 1965 – NAMI-0103
- 1965 – NAMI-0105
- 1965 – NAMI-0106
- 1965 – NAMI-0112
- 1966 – NAMI-032SK, hovercraft
- 1966 – NAMI-058S-862
- 1966 – NAMI-0107 "Vasilyok" (Cornflower)
- 1966 – NAMI-0127
- 1966 – NAMI-0143-SKhZ
- 1967 – NAMI-0107B
- 1968 – NAMI-072C
- 1968 – NAMI-0114
- 1968 – NAMI-0132
- 1968 – NAMI-0137 – based on the ZAZ-966
- 1968 – NAMI-0169
- 1968 – NAMI-MeMZ-0127
- 1969 – NAMI-0162 – transferred to IzhAuto and continued as the Izh-5 (Izh-4x4)
- 1970 – NAMI-0145
- 1971 – NAMI-0129
- 1971 – NAMI-0173 – front-drive version of GAZ-24 Volga
- 1971 – NAMI-0157BK
- 1973 – NAMI-0159 – based on the LAZ-696
- 1976 – NAMI-0196
- 1977 – NAMI-0157M – prototype for Ural-5920
- 1977 – NAMI-UAZ-469B
- 1981 – NAMI-0231 – prototype for VAZ-1111
- 1984 – NAMI-0188
- 1984 – NAMI-0266
- 1985 – NAMI-0267
- 1985 – NAMI-3305
- 1987 – NAMI-0284 "Debyut" (Debut); first concept car developed during perestroika
- 1987 – NAMI-0286 "Tayfun" (Typhoon)
- 1988 – NAMI-0342 "Kuzya"
- 1988–1989 – NAMI-LuAZ-Proto
- 1988–1991 – NAMI-0290 "Apel'sin" (Orange) – based on ZAZ-1102
- 1989 – NAMI-0281
- 1989 – NAMI-0295 "Rus'"
- 1990 – NAMI-0284 "Debyut-2"
- 1990 – NAMI-0288 "Kompakt"
- 1990 – NAMI-Kompakt-2
- 1991 – NAMI-0300 "Apel'sin-2"
- 1992 – NAMI "Oda" Concept
- 1992–2000 – NAMI-1819 "Umka"
- 1994 – NAMI-2160 "Kentavr"
- 1994 – NAMI "Retro"
- 1995 – NAMI-GAZ "Volga-Prestige"
- 1997–1999 – NAMI "Grenader"
- 1998 – NAMI-UAZ-469 "Huntsman"
- 1999 – NAMI "Tachanka"
- 2006 – NAMI-1337
- 2006 – NAMI-2339
- 2006 – NAMI-GAZ "Valdai"
- 2011 – NAMI-3333
- 2016 – NAMI "Shatl" (Shuttle)

== Notable employee ==
- Mozharov Pyotr Vladimirovich
