= Konrad Adenauer (disambiguation) =

Konrad Adenauer (1876-1967) was a conservative German statesman and Chancellor of Germany (1949-1963).

Konrad Adenauer may also refer to:

- Konrad Adenauer (aircraft), airplane used by the German government
- Konrad Adenauer Foundation
