= AF1 =

AF1 or AF-1 may refer to:

- Air Force One, the air traffic callsign for the plane (if operated by the Air Force) that the President of the United States is aboard
- Arena Football One (2025), a new Arena football league in the US
- USS Bridge (AF-1), the lead ship of her class of stores ships for the US Navy
- Air Force 1 (shoe), produced by Nike, Inc.
- Methyl fluoroacetate

== See also ==
- Air Force One (disambiguation)
- First Air Force (1 AF), USAF numbered air force
