= Japanese Air Force One =

Dedicated Japanese government aircraft

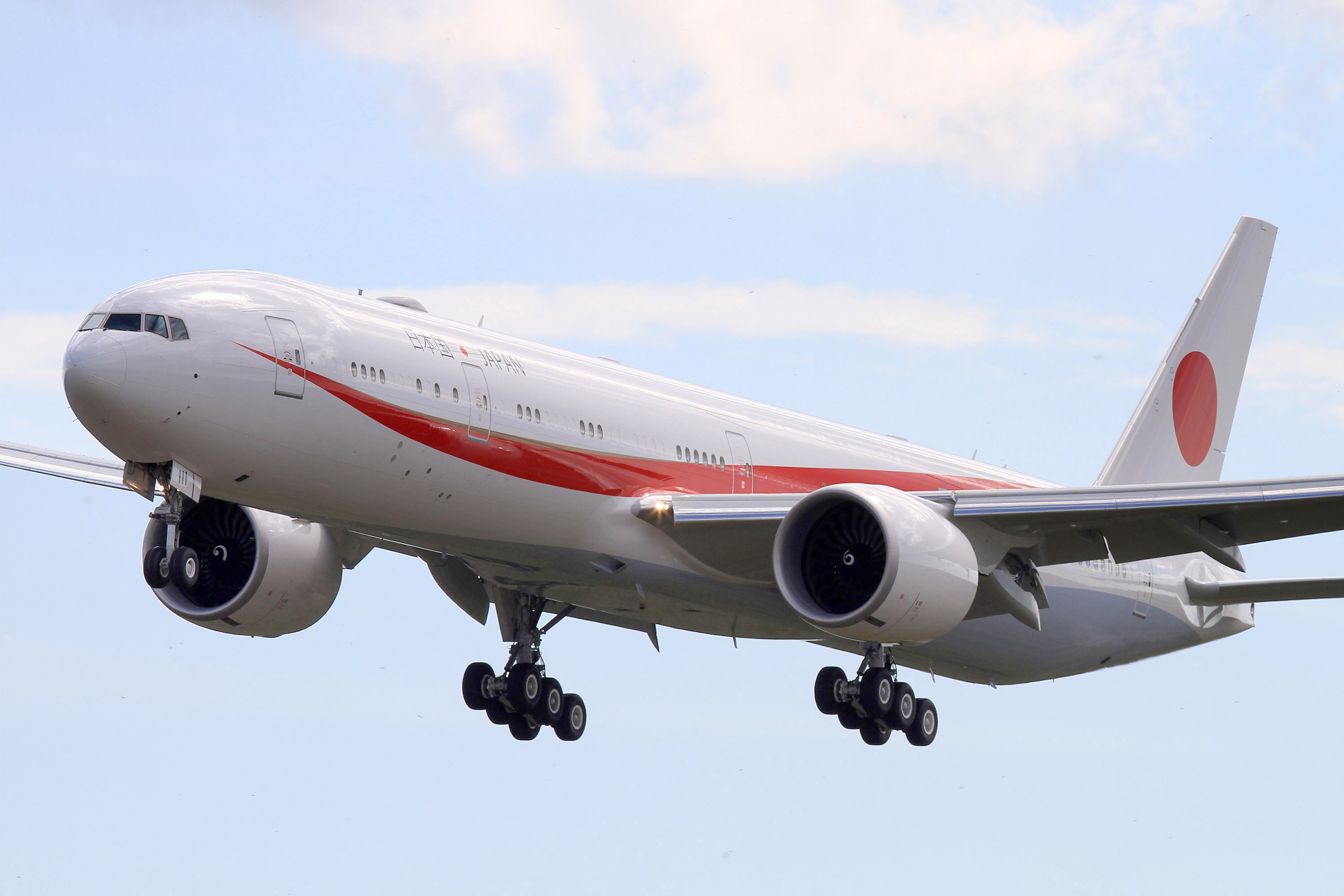
The second generation Japanese Air Force One, a Boeing 777-300ER

The Japanese Air Force One and Japanese Air Force Two are the radio callsigns of the two Boeing 777-300ER aircraft used by the government of Japan for overseas travel by the Emperor, Prime Minister and other high-ranking officials. Each aircraft has a capacity of 140 passengers and can be used for emergency evacuations of Japanese citizens and overseas deployment of Japan Self-Defense Forces personnel. The aircraft are operated by the Japan Air Self-Defense Force.

The aircraft are officially referred to as Japanese government exclusive aircraft (日本国政府専用機, Nippon-koku seifu sen'yōki). They have the radio callsigns Japanese Air Force One and Japanese Air Force Two, prefixed as JF e.g JF001, when operating on official business, and Cygnus One and Cygnus Two, prefixed as CYGNS e.g. CYGNS11, when operating outside of official business (e.g., on training flights). As of 1 April 2026, the callsign "JPNG", vocalised as "Jyapang" to emphasise pronunciation as "Japan", replaced "CYGNS", spoken as "Cygnus". The aircraft have been routinely tracked using the new callsign e.g. "JPNG11" and "JPNG31" since. However, on official business, especially with the Royal Family or Prime Minister on board, JF01 and JF02 is used spoken as Japanese Air Force Zero One and Japanese Air Force Zero Two. Other officials or other prominent government missions will use different numbers e.g. JF701 as was used when it flew from Chitose Air Base, Japan to Newquay Airport, England for the 47th G7 summit in Cornwall on 31 May 2021. The two aircraft always fly together on government missions, with one serving as the primary transport and the other serving as a backup with maintenance personnel on board. The aircraft use the General Electric GE90-115B.

The 777-300ER replaced the original 747-400 aircraft in early 2019.

== History ==
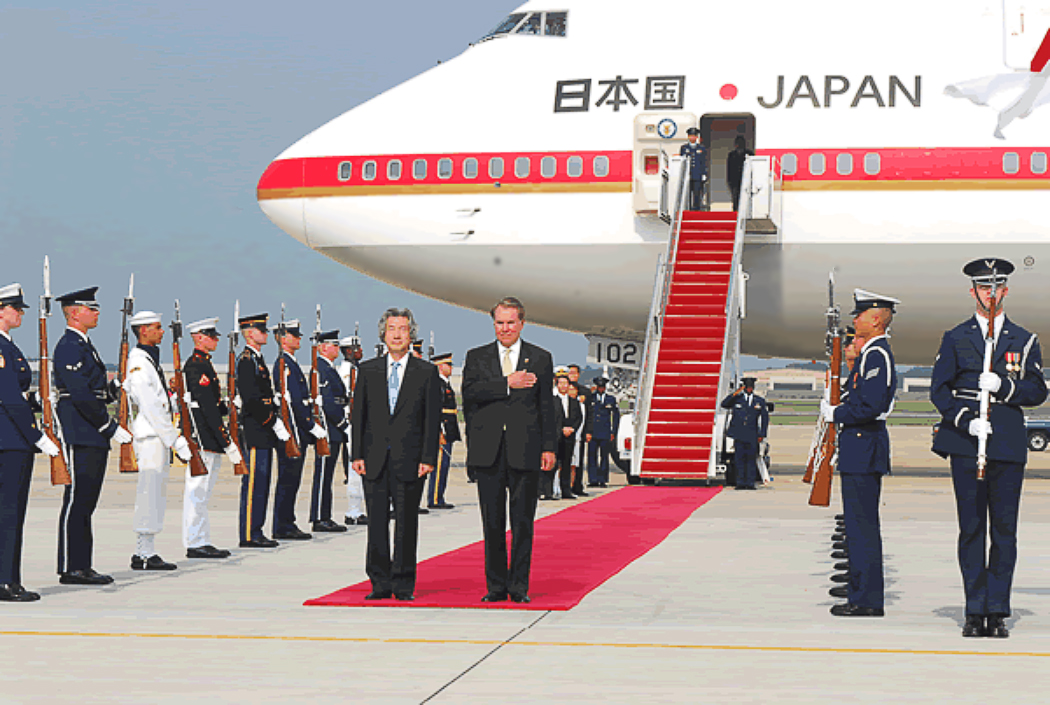
Former Prime Minister Junichiro Koizumi (left) arrives in the United States on Japanese Air Force One (28 June 2006)

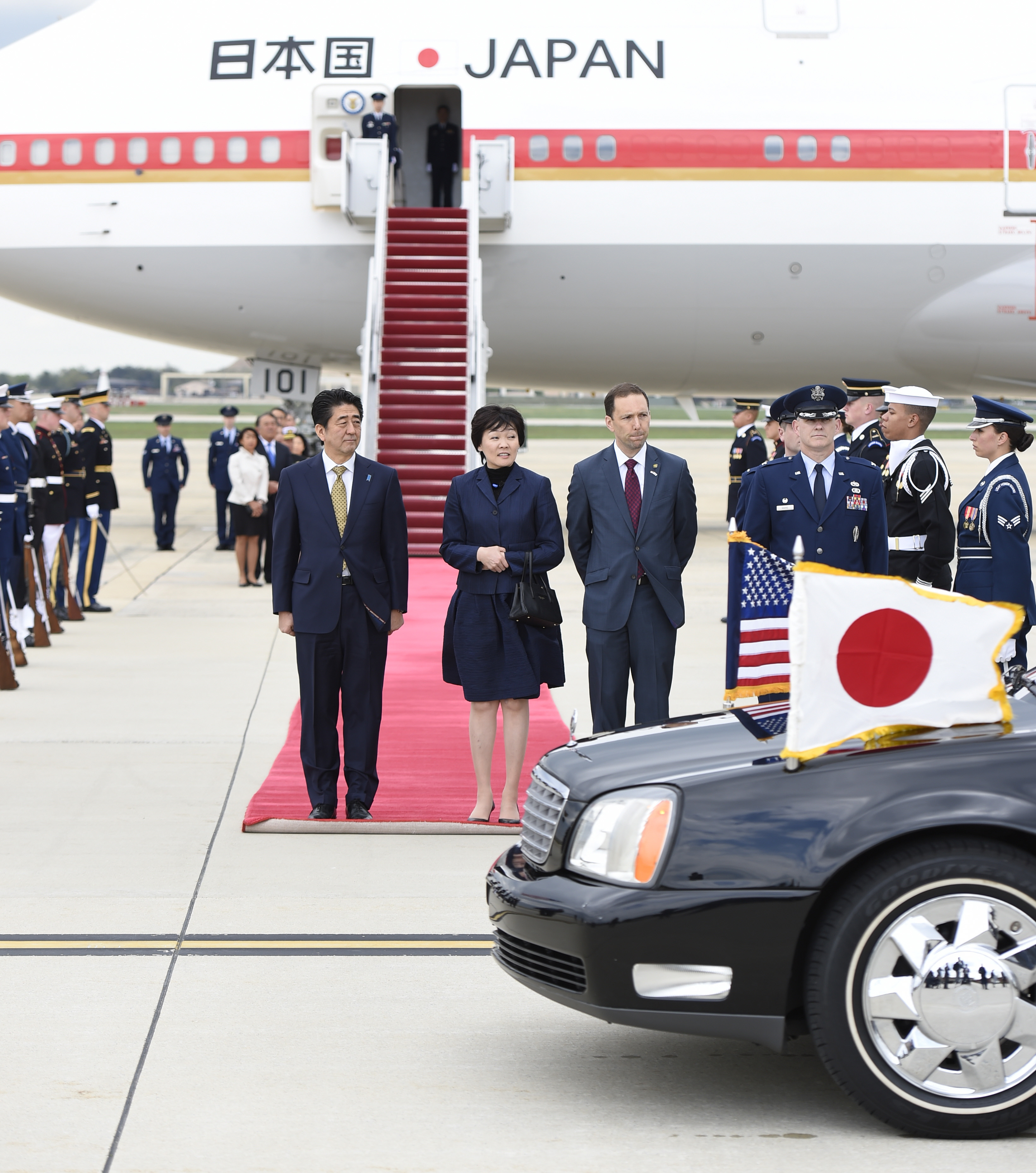
Former Prime Minister Shinzō Abe (left) arrives in the US with the 747-400 (2015)

During the early postwar era, the Japanese government generally used the state-chartered international airline, Japan Airlines (JAL), for official trips overseas.

The Japanese government began investigating the possibility of purchasing dedicated government transport aircraft during the 1970s. Much of the impetus came from problems in using JAL: labor unions were unwilling to put aircrews at risk in missions to evacuate Japanese citizens from overseas, and often objected to transporting members of the Japan Self-Defense Forces overseas for political reasons. The privatization of JAL in the mid-1980s hastened the process.

The Cabinet of Japan decided to purchase two Boeing 747-400 aircraft in 1987 in order to have aircraft with worldwide operating range. Another goal of the 36 billion yen purchase was to counterbalance the growing trade deficit between Japan and the US.

Both aircraft were delivered in the fall of 1991 (though one source has the second delivery as being in April 1992). Kiichi Miyazawa was the first prime minister to use the 747 when he visited the US in 1993; the Emperor used the aircraft for the first time later that year.

German chancellor Gerhard Schröder joined Japanese prime minister Junichiro Koizumi aboard the aircraft in 2002 in order to attend the 2002 FIFA World Cup finals in Yokohama, to which Germany advanced while Schröder was attending a G8 summit in Canada. The operation, hastily improvised due to difficulties in flying the German government's A310 aircraft from Canada to Japan, was called "hitchhiking diplomacy" in the Japanese media. This was the first time a foreign head of government had flown on the aircraft.

The aircraft were used to transport relief workers to the area of the 2010 Canterbury earthquake in New Zealand. Foreign Minister Seiji Maehara offered use of the aircraft to evacuate Japanese nationals on the return flight, but was forced to withdraw this offer when the foreign ministry pointed out that there was not enough space for all of them on board.

In January 2011, Prime Minister Naoto Kan was criticized for using the aircraft for a trip to the World Economic Forum in Davos while 500 Japanese nationals were stranded in the midst of civil unrest in Cairo. The Weekly Asahi tabloid newspaper stated that the Foreign Ministry had requested use of the aircraft for evacuation purposes but that Kan had rejected the request citing the priority of the Davos mission. Kan denied that such a discussion had taken place, and the Foreign Ministry stated that the aircraft was not used because of the difficulty of getting landing and transit permits from various governments on short notice. Kan later considered using the aircraft for a trip to Germany to watch the Japanese team play in the finals of the 2011 FIFA Women's World Cup, but advisors dissuaded him from doing so due to the high cost and possibility of public outcry in the wake of the 2011 Tohoku earthquake and tsunami.

The Democratic Party of Japan government requested public comments about the Japanese government budget in 2011, and many responses criticized the aircraft as wasteful, suggesting that the government should switch back to charters of private aircraft as required; however, following a hostage crisis in Algeria in 2013, the Shinzo Abe government determined that the aircraft should be maintained for national security purposes.

As of August 2013, the aircraft had completed 269 missions.

== Layout Boeing 747 ==
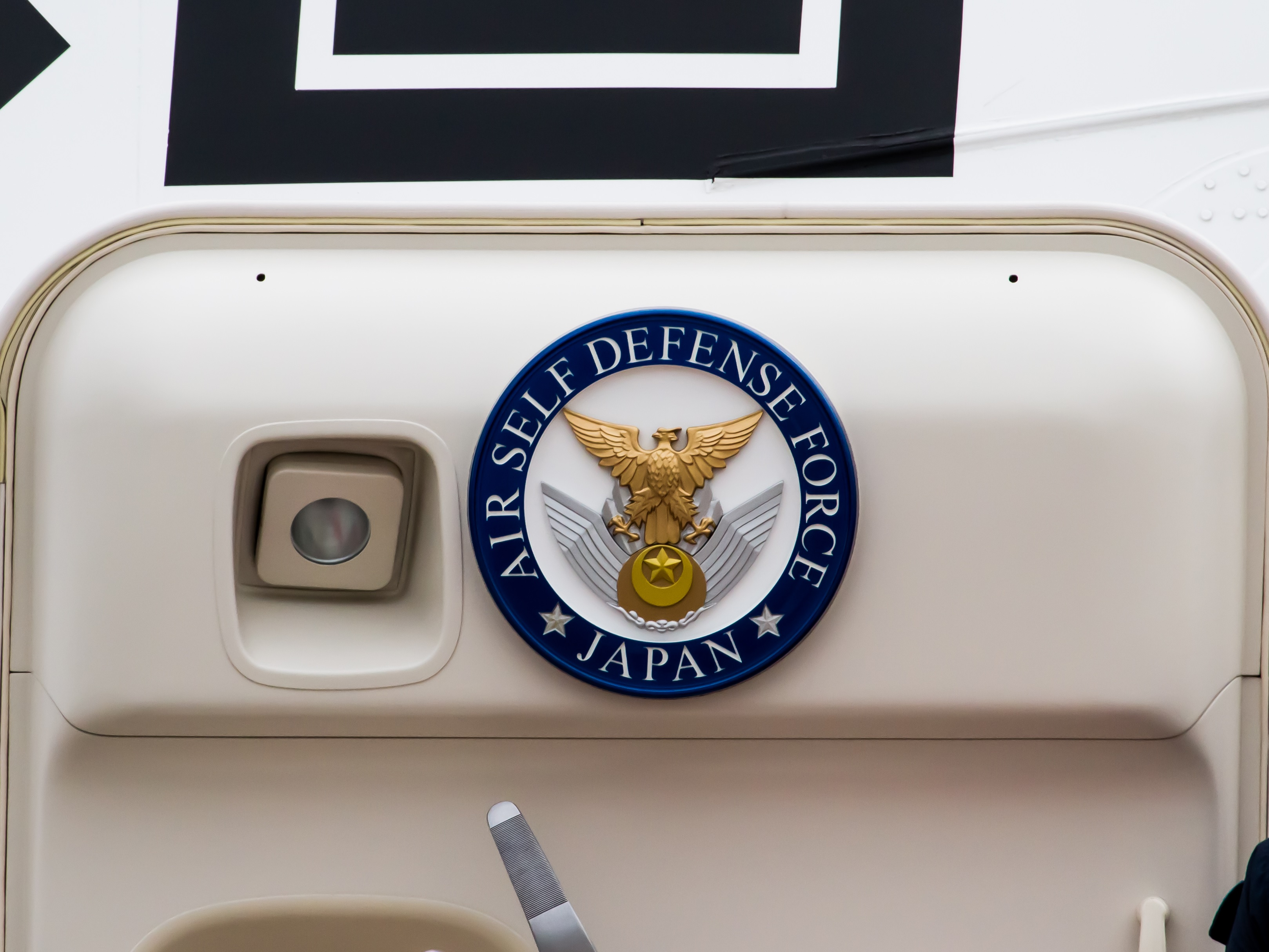
Japan Air Self-Defense Force emblem mounted inside the L-1 door

The aircraft are painted with red and gold stripes along the fuselage and Hinomaru insignia on the tail and wings.

The aircraft contains an office area in the front-most section of the lower level, ordinarily for use by the prime minister, which may be repurposed for use by the Imperial family or other VIPs. The next cabin toward the front has lie-flat seating for senior officials (2-3-2 configuration), a separate enclosed VIP cabin with two seats, a conference table with seats that fold down into beds, and a secretarial area with office equipment. The main cabin normally functions as a seating area for reporters, with seating equivalent to airline short-haul business class seating (also 2-3-2 configuration), and has a table at the front to be used for press conferences. These cabins may be used as passenger seating on evacuation missions. The upper deck has seating equivalent to airline economy class seating (3-3 and 2-3 configuration), which is used for communications and crew rest.

== Operation ==
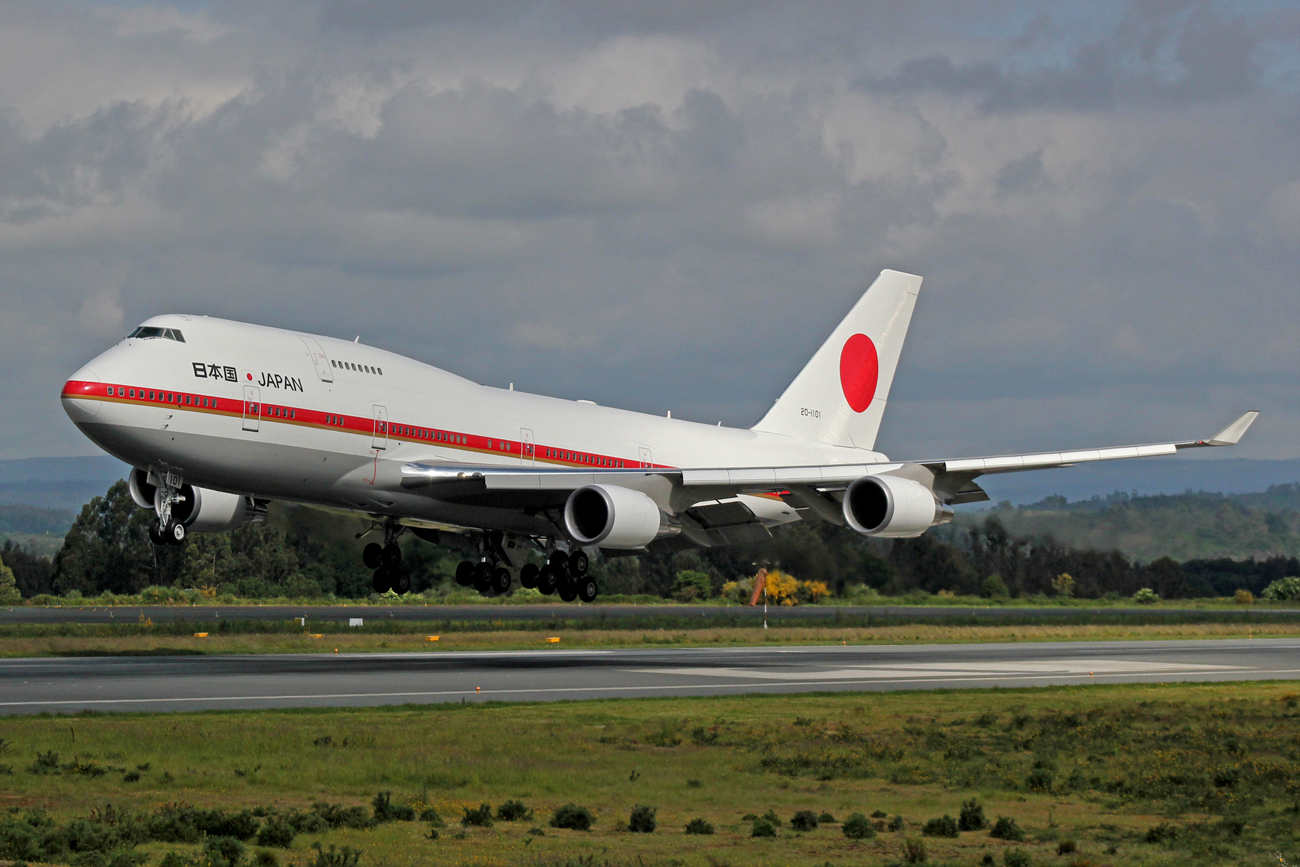
JASDF Boeing 747-400 landing at Santiago de Compostela Airport

Although the aircraft were initially operated by the prime minister's office as civil aircraft, they were transferred to Japan Defense Agency control in April 1992 and re-registered as defense aircraft. They are currently operated by the Special Airlift Group, 701st Squadron (特別航空輸送隊 第701飛行隊, Tokubetsu Kōkū Yusō-tai Dai-nana-hyaku-ichi Hikō-tai) of the Japan Air Self-Defense Force, and are based at Chitose Air Base in Hokkaido. Each aircraft operates with a standard crew complement of 17 to 19 personnel, consisting of two to four pilots, three communications operators and twelve flight attendants.

For shorter VIP flights, the government also uses Eurocopter EC225 helicopters (GSDF 1st Helicopter Brigade) and Gulfstream IV business jets (ASDF, known as U-4 in Japanese defense parlance). The Gulfstream IV was only used as a prime ministerial aircraft once, by Yasuo Fukuda to travel from Beijing to Nagasaki at short notice when the 747 was unavailable.

Unlike the American Air Force One, the Japanese government exclusive aircraft may only be used for government business for overseas, and cannot normally be used for personal travel by the Imperial family or the prime minister.

On the other hand, Japan's government aircraft, like the Prime Minister's car and royal car, are state-owned assets and are not the property of the imperial court or the Prime Minister. Its purpose is basically used only when traveling abroad, and it is rarely used for domestic travels, including official business. When moving between Haneda Airport and domestic airport addition to using regular flights of All Nippon Airways and Japan Airlines, When visiting disaster areas, the Air Self-Defense U-4 is also used.

During emergency evacuations of Japanese citizens from particularly dangerous areas overseas, personnel from the Guide Unit of the 1st Airborne Brigade, along with officials from the MOFA will travel on the aircraft, in order to assist with the retrieval and transport of evacuees to evacuation points.

Japan Airlines provided ground support services for the aircraft until December 2010, shortly prior to JAL's retirement of its 747 fleet. Those services were then provided by Nippon Cargo Airlines.

In July 2019, both aircraft were transferred to American company CSDS Asset Management LLC, a subsidiary of CSDS Aircraft Sales & Leasing Inc in California. 20-1102 became N7477C and 20-1101 become N7474C, and were ferried to Pinal Airpark in Arizona. They were then sold to Cargojet in Canada for their engines. 20-1101 remains at Pinal, and 20-1102 has since been broken up and scrapped.

The VIP area of the interiors were removed prior to the transfer, with one example on display at Ishikawa Aviation Plaza in Komatsu, Japan.

== Second generation ==
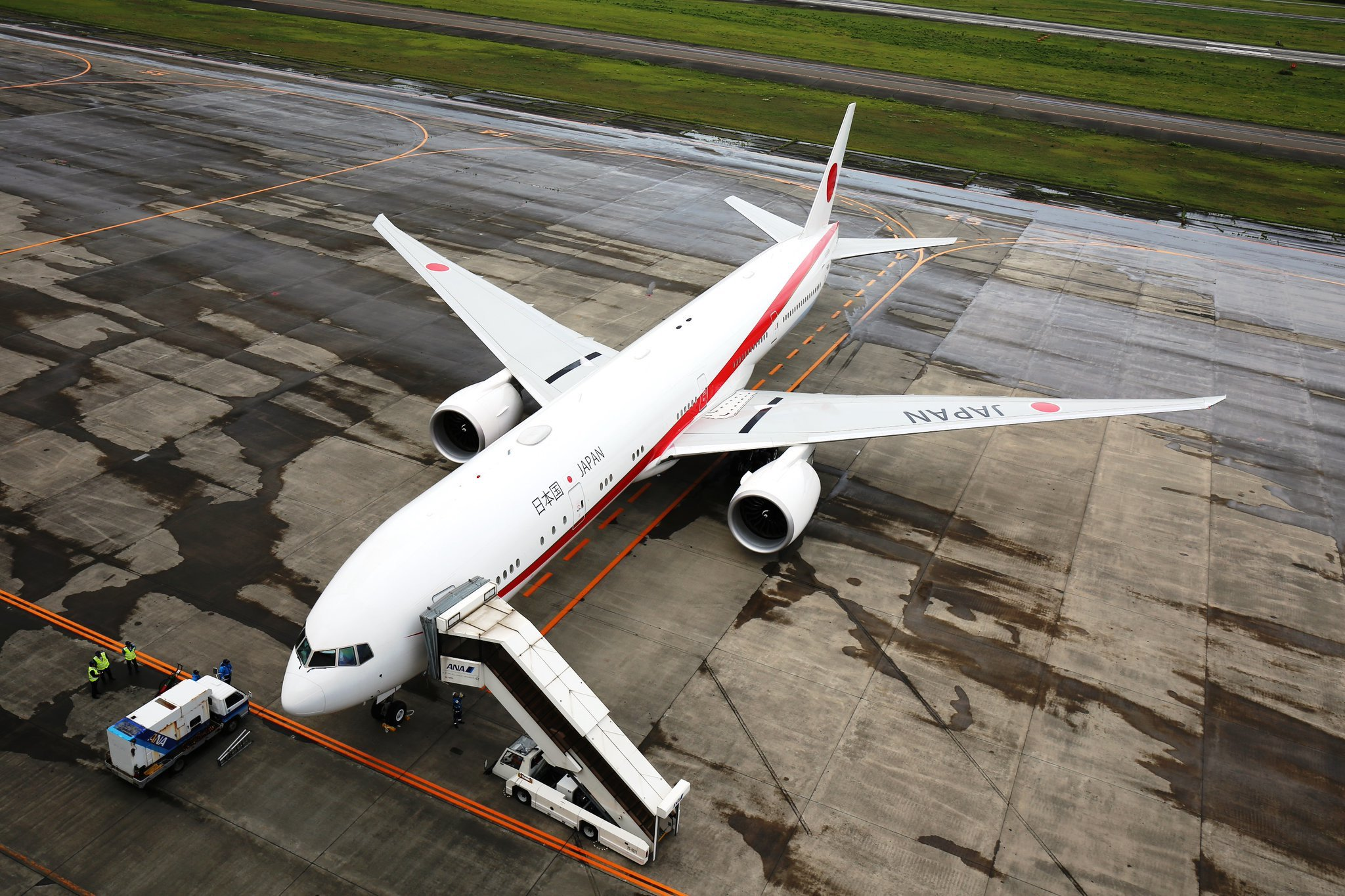
Japanese Air Force One parked (Boeing 777) in 2018

While the 787 was reportedly a leading candidate to replace the 747s at one point due to its fuel efficiency and its large proportion of Japanese components, and the A350 was also raised as a candidate by some officials, the Ministry of Defense favored the 777 due to its capabilities being closer to those of the 747.

The aircraft were replaced by 777-300ER aircraft in the fiscal year 2019, with maintenance outsourced to All Nippon Airways. The first 777-300ER arrived at Chitose Air Base to commence testing and training on August 17, 2018, while the second arrived on December 11, 2018.

The Boeing 747-400 were taken out of service, stored at Sapporo for a period of time prior to their transfer to Pinal Airpark in the United States.

On August 26, 2021, it was dispatched to Islamabad to help in evacuating vulnerable Afghans.

== Specifications ==
=== First generation ===
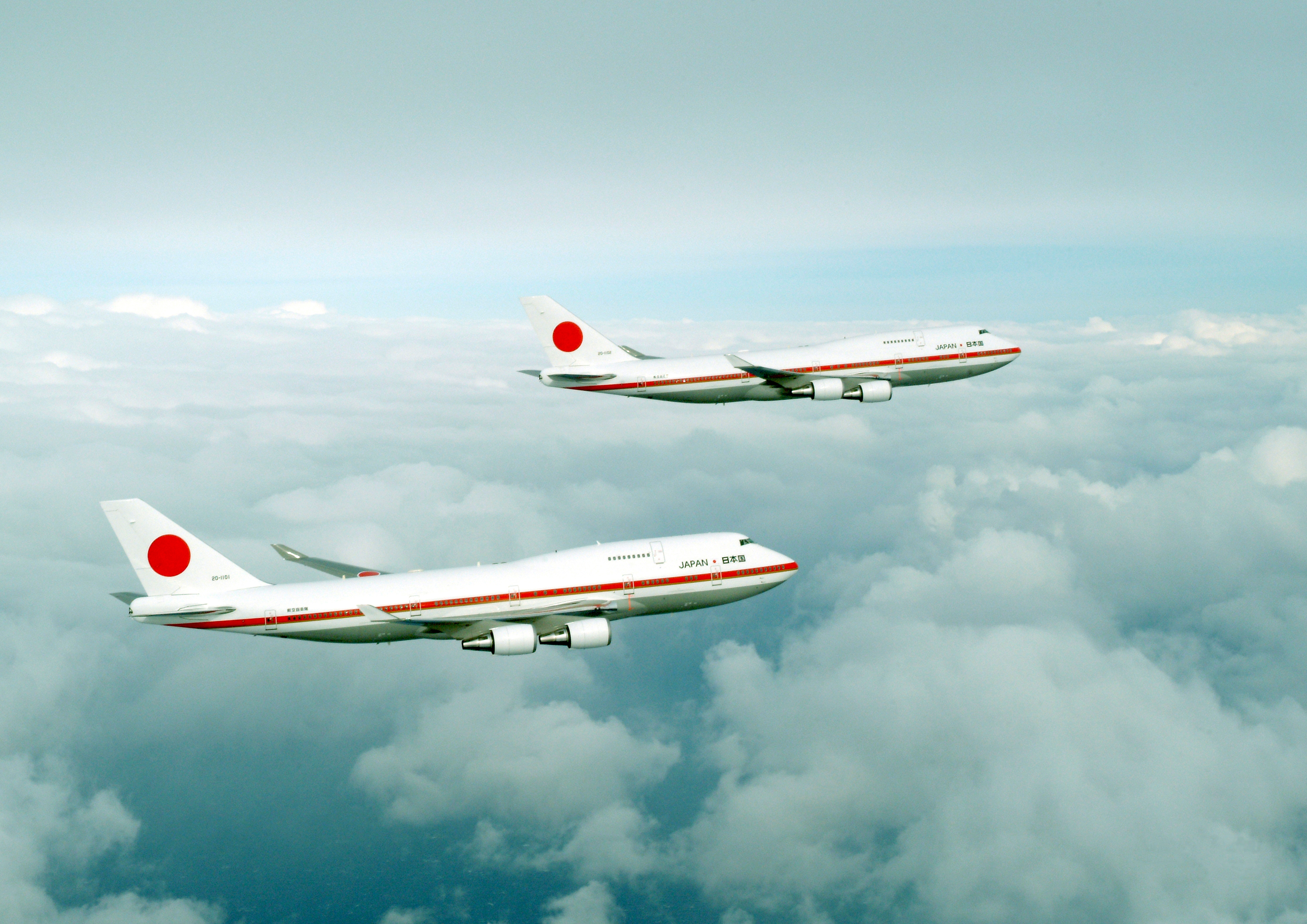
Both Japanese Air Force One in formation flight (first generation)

- Model: Boeing 747-47C
- Engine: General Electric CF6-80C2B1F
- Affiliation: Japan Air Self Defense Force, Air Support Group, Special Air Transport Corps
- Aircraft number: 20-1101, 20-1102
- Number of aircraft: 2 (usually 2 aircraft are operated as a pair at the same time)
- Start of operation: 1993
- Retired: March 2019

=== Second generation ===
- Model: Boeing 777-300ER
- Engine: General Electric GE90-115B
- Affiliation: Japan Air Self Defense Force, Air Support Group, Special Air Transport Corps
- Aircraft number: 80-1111, 80-1112
- Number of aircraft: 2
- Start of operation: April 2019
- Status: Operational.

== See also ==
- Air transports of heads of state and government
- State and royal cars of Japan
