= Air Force One (disambiguation) =

Air Force One is the call sign for any U.S. Air Force aircraft carrying the President of the United States.

Air Force One may also refer to:

- Boeing VC-25, the current Boeing 747-based Air Force One
- Air Force One (film), 1997 film by Wolfgang Petersen
- Air Force 1 (shoe), an athletic shoe made by Nike
- "Air Force Ones" (song), a 2002 hip hop song by Nelly
- Japanese Air Force One
- Brazilian Air Force One
- Colombian Air Force One

== See also ==
- First Air Force (1AF), a USAF numbered air force
- Air transports of heads of state and government
- Bearforce 1, European band with a play on the Air Force 1 name
