= President of Colombia =

Head of state and government

President of the Republic of Colombia
- Presidente de la República de Colombia
- Presidential flag

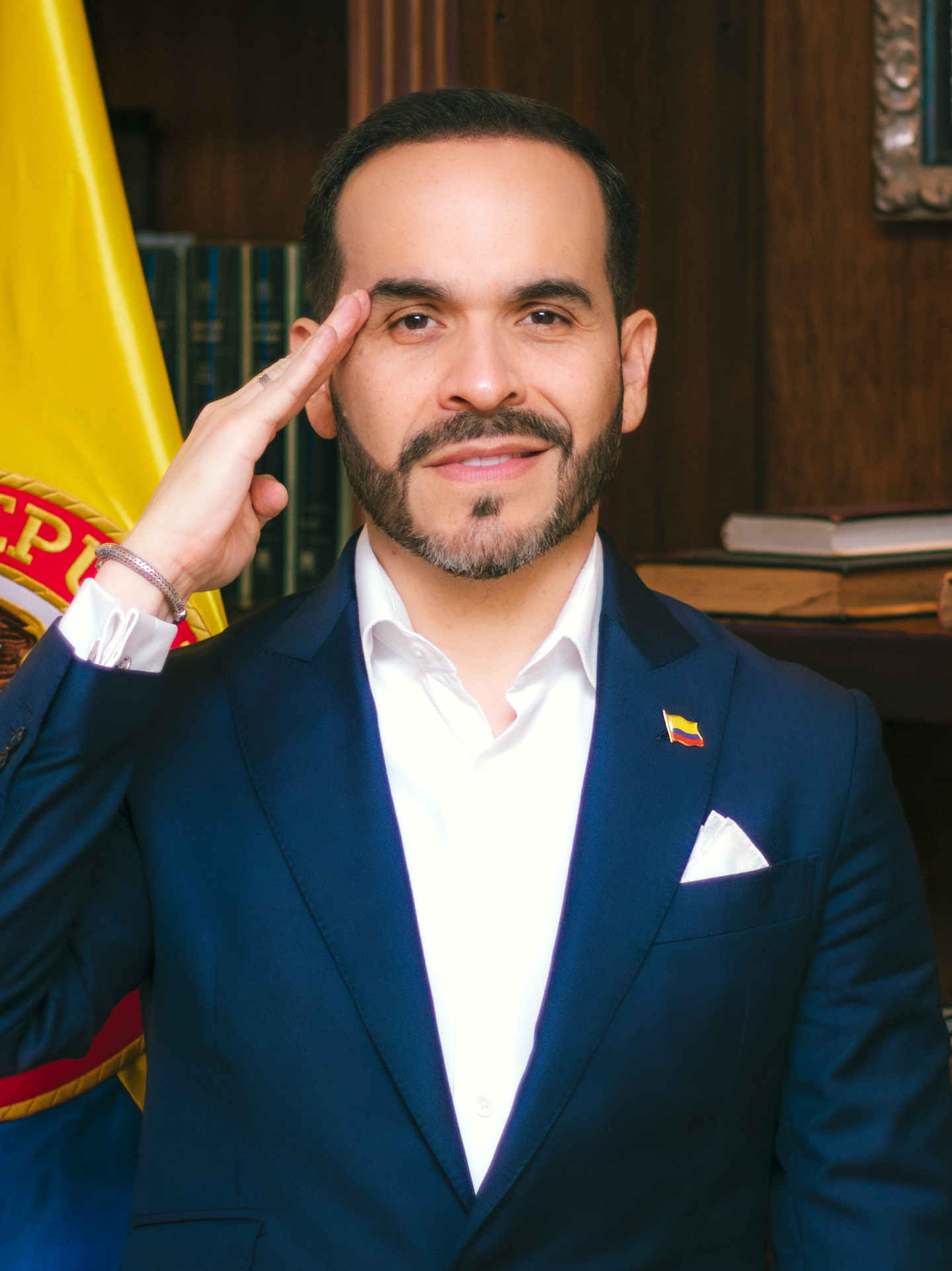
- Incumbent; Abelardo de la Espriella since 7 August 2026
- Executive branch of the Government of Colombia
- Style: Mr./Madam President (Señor/a Presidente/a) (informal); The Honourable (El/La Honorable) (formal); The Most Excellent (Excelentísimo/a Señor/a) (diplomatic); His/Her Excellency (Su Excelencia) (diplomatic)
- Type: Head of state Head of government Commander-in-chief
- Abbreviation: PDTE-CO
- Member of: Cabinet; National Government; National Economic Council
- Residence: Casa de Nariño
- Seat: Bogotá, D.C.
- Appointer: Popular vote or via succession
- Term length: Four years, non renewable
- Constituting instrument: Constitution of Colombia (1991)
- Formation: December 17, 1819 (206 years ago)
- First holder: Simón Bolívar
- Succession: Line of succession
- Salary: Colombian pesos 32,624,000/US$ 6,847 monthly
- Website: www.presidencia.gov.co (in Spanish)

The president of Colombia (President of the Republic) is the head of state and head of government of Colombia. The president heads the executive branch of the national government and is the commander-in-chief of the Military Forces of Colombia.

The power of the presidency has grown substantially since the first president, Simón Bolívar, took office in 1819. While presidential power has waxed and waned over time, the presidency has played an increasingly important role in Colombian political life since the early 20th century, with a notable expansion during the presidency of Álvaro Uribe.

The office of president was established upon the ratification of the Constitution of 1819, by the Congress of Angostura, convened in December 1819, when Colombia was the Gran Colombia. The first president, General Simón Bolívar, took office in 1819. His position, initially self-proclaimed, was subsequently ratified by Congress.

The president is directly elected through Universal Suffrage for a period of four years, along with the vice president. According to article 125 of the constitution, ratified in 2015, no person who has been elected for a presidential term can be elected for a second. In addition, three vice presidents have become president by virtue of the death or resignation of a president during the term. In total, 34 people have served in 36 presidencies that span 48 month (four-year) terms, with Alfonso López Pumarejo, Álvaro Uribe and Juan Manuel Santos being the only ones with double terms, in the case of López Pumarejo non-consecutive. Abelardo de la Espriella is the 36th and current president, having assumed office on 7 August 2026.

== Executive powers ==
=== Commander-in-chief ===
One of the most important executive powers is the role of the president as Commander-in-Chief of the Colombian Military Forces. The power to declare war is constitutionally vested in Congress, but the president has ultimate responsibility for the direction and disposition of the armed forces. The exact degree of authority that the Constitution grants to the president as commander in chief has been ratified in article 189 of the Constitution, where it is described that the president has the function of directing the public force and disposing of it as Supreme Commander of the Armed Forces of the Republic.

=== Administrative powers ===
The executive branch is responsible for executing, in a coordinated manner, all the administrative activities that are at the service of the general interests of the community for the fulfillment of the essential purposes of the state. It is represented by the president of the republic, who symbolizes national unity, is the head of state, head of government and supreme administrative authority.

The national government is formed by the president of the republic, the ministers of the office and the directors of administrative departments. The president and the corresponding minister or director of the department, in each particular business, constitute the government.

=== Judicial powers ===
The responsibility of judging the president of the republic is found in the Supreme Court of Justice, the main body in the event that the president is taken to political trial. Within the actions of the Supreme Court there will be 7 of which are the judge, the president of the republic, or whoever acts in his place, and the senior officials referred to in article 174, for any punishable act imputed to them, in accordance with article 175 numerals 2 and 3.

=== Foreign affairs ===
it requires the president to "receive the ambassadors." This clause, known as the Reception Clause, has been interpreted to imply that the president possesses broad power over matters of foreign policy, and endorses the exclusive authority of the president to grant recognition to a foreign government. The Constitution also empowers the president to appoint Colombian ambassadors and to propose and mainly negotiate agreements between Colombia and other countries. Such agreements, upon receiving the advice of the minister of foreign affairs, become binding with the force of national law.

While foreign affairs have always been an important element of presidential responsibilities, technological advances since the adoption of the Constitution have increased presidential power. Where previously ambassadors were vested with significant power by the president to negotiate independently on Colombia's behalf, presidents now routinely meet directly with leaders of foreign countries.

== Leadership roles ==
As head of state, the president is the visible face of Colombia's domestic and foreign policy. In his role as leader, one of his aspects is to represent and safeguard the international image of the country. Since 1934 it has been the protocol of the First Lady, she is the one who is in charge of accompanying the president at his receptions. and state visits abroad, gaining more importance over time.

The president of Colombia symbolizes the National Unity, and after taking an oath to the Constitution of Colombia and swearing to defend and protect the nation's laws, he is charged to guarantee and protect the rights and liberties of all Colombian nationals.

The Administrative Department of the Presidency of Colombia has the commission to assist or support the president of Colombia on its constitutional mandated functions and legal issues.

Article 115 states that the National Government is formed by the president of Colombia, the vice president of Colombia, the Council of Ministers of the Republic of Colombia and the Directors of the Administrative Departments of Colombia. Any official from these entities constitute the Government of Colombia in any particular business.

Any act by the president of Colombia, in order to be legal and enforceable, must be sanctioned by any of the ministries or department directors, who will also be held responsible for the act. The only exception is if the president appoints or removes ministers, administrative departments' directors and any other officials appointed by him under his administrative authority. Governors of the Departments of Colombia, mayors of Municipalities of Colombia, as well as regional superintendents of Colombia, public establishments and industrial and commercial state owned enterprises, are all part of the executive branch of Colombia.

== Selection process ==
=== Eligibility ===
The president must be a natural-born citizen of Colombia, at least 30 years of age. The Constitution of Colombia requires the president to meet the same eligibility requirements as the president that can be re-elected.

- be a natural-born citizen
- be at least 30 years old

=== Campaigns and nomination ===
The modern presidential campaign begins before primary elections, which political parties use to clear the field of candidates before their national nominating conventions, where the most successful candidate is the party's or coalition's presidential candidate. In general, the presidential candidate of the party or, failing that, the coalition of parties chooses a candidate for the vice-presidency, generally being the second with the highest number of votes in the convention. The most common previous profession of presidents is that of a lawyer.

=== Election ===
The president and vice president serve a term of office of four years after being elected by popular vote. Since 2015, the president has been barred from running for reelection, even for a nonconsecutive term.

From 1910 to 2005, the president was limited to a single term. However, on 24 November 2005, the Colombian Congress introduced the Electoral Guarantees Law (Ley de Garantias Electorales), which modified Article 152, of the Colombian Constitution of 1991 and allowed a president to run for a second term. The President or Vice President running for re-election was required to formally notify the National Electoral Council and guarantee a fair competition for the other contenders. Participation of acting officials in political proselytism was standardized. Presidents or vice presidents not running for office were barred from participating on political proselytism. If one or both were running, they could only engage in political activity four months before the primary elections. Also, if the president and/or vice president were running for office, they could participate in their political party's selection mechanism to postulate candidates. In 2010, the Constitutional Court of Colombia threw out a planned referendum to allow presidents to run for three consecutive terms. It ruled that Colombian presidents could only serve two terms, even if they are nonconsecutive. In 2015, a constitutional amendment repealed the 2004 changes and reverted to the original one-term limit.

=== Inauguration ===
The inauguration of the President is made up of various ceremonies and traditions carried out on August 7 every four years. Through democratic elections or coups, resignations and deaths, presidential inaugurations have been important events in the history of Colombia, which at the same time mark the beginning of new eras.

=== Presidential sash ===
The presidential sash is considered symbolic, which determines the figure of the president. There are no official records, but the first presidential sash was claimed to have been introduced by Antonio Nariño, who simulated the decoration sash of order. Over the years, it has had different designs, with one of the most characteristic being its first design, consisting of the 3 colors of the national flag.

Currently, the presidential sash consists of the colors of the flag in the same order with the only difference that it consists of the coat of arms in the central part, emulating the presidential flag.

== Incumbency ==
=== Residence ===
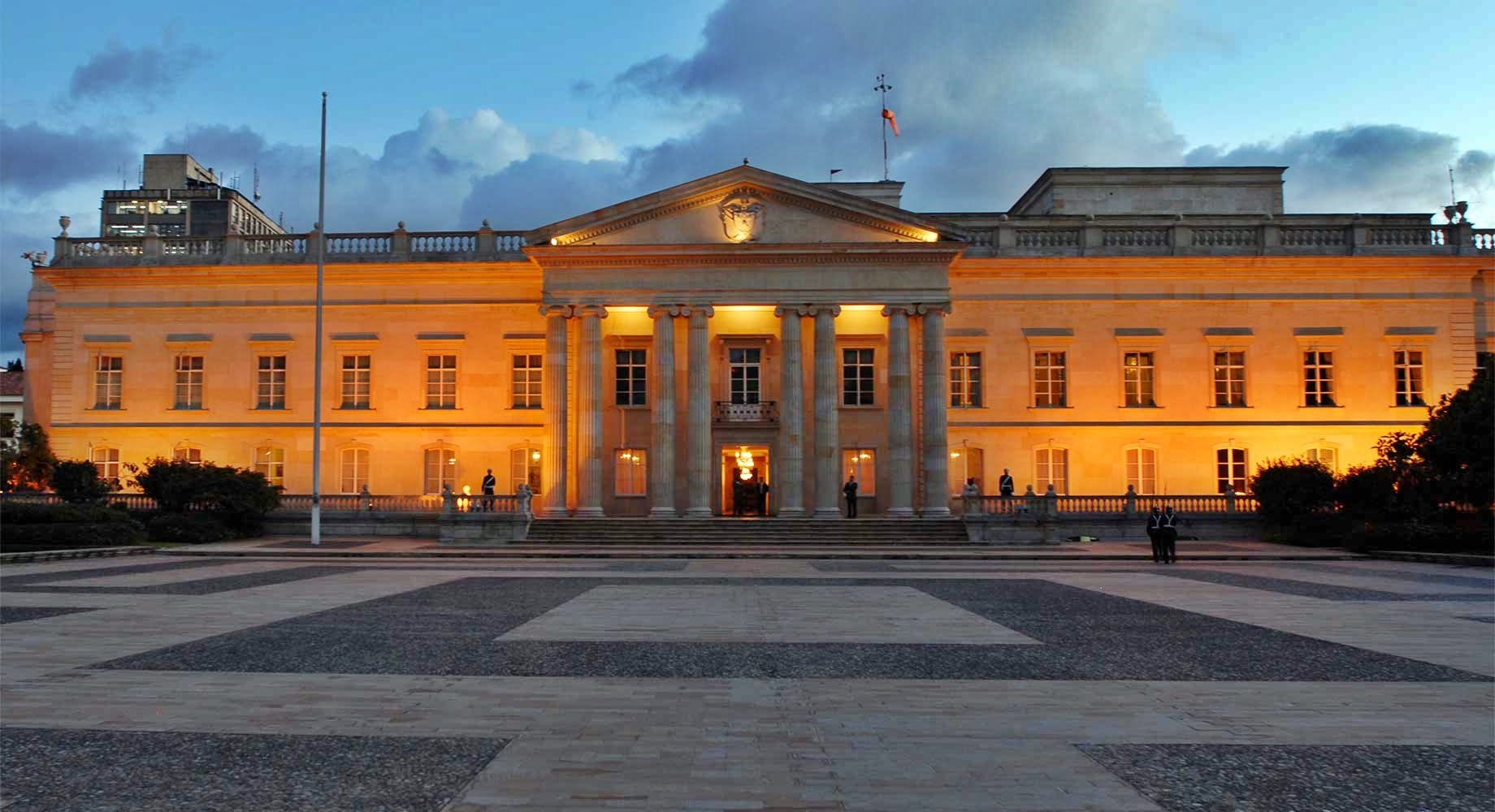
Casa de Nariño

Currently the official residence of the Colombian president is the Casa de Nariño. While in office, the president has the right to use its facilities and personnel, including medical care, recreation, domestic services, and security services. The first presidential palace where Simón Bolívar dispatched after Independence of Colombia was the former Palace of the Viceroys, which was located on the western side of the Plaza Mayor of Bogotá (where the Palacio Liévano is currently located). The 1827 earthquake left the property partially destroyed, for which reason the presidential office and the official residence were moved to the Palacio de San Carlos. In 1885, the president Rafael Núñez ordered the purchase of the house where Antonio Nariño was born to use it as an official residence. In 1906, the architect Gastón Lelarge transformed the property into the Palacio de la Carrera and in 1979 the architect Fernando Alsina remodeled the building to the current Casa de Nariño and designed the Plaza de Armas that left it directly connected to the National Capitol.

The House of Illustrious Guests in the city of Cartagena de Indias is the house where the Colombian president receives international guests. Likewise, the President has the Hato Grande country estate, located in Sopó, Cundinamarca as a resting place, which belonged to General Francisco de Paula Santander and was later acquired by the businessman from Antioquia Pepe Sierra, whose family donated it to the national government.

=== Travel ===
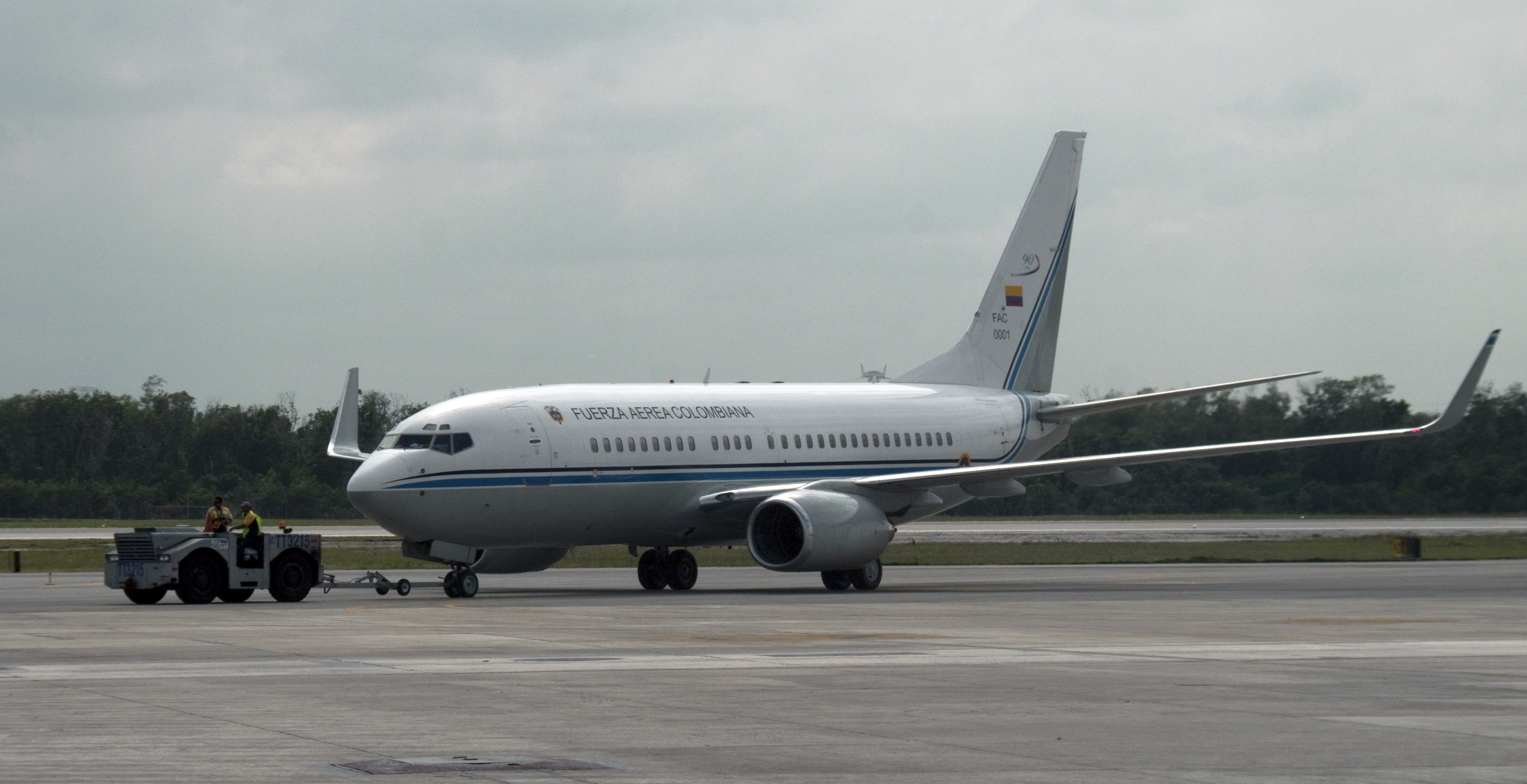
Boeing Business Jet.

When traveling within Colombia or abroad, the President of the Republic uses the presidential plane identified with the registration FAC 0001, (a Boeing 737 Business Jet BBJ class). The president also uses two helicopters in VIP configuration, a Bell 412 with the registration FAC 0004 and a UH-60 Black Hawk with the registration FAC 0007.

=== Protection ===
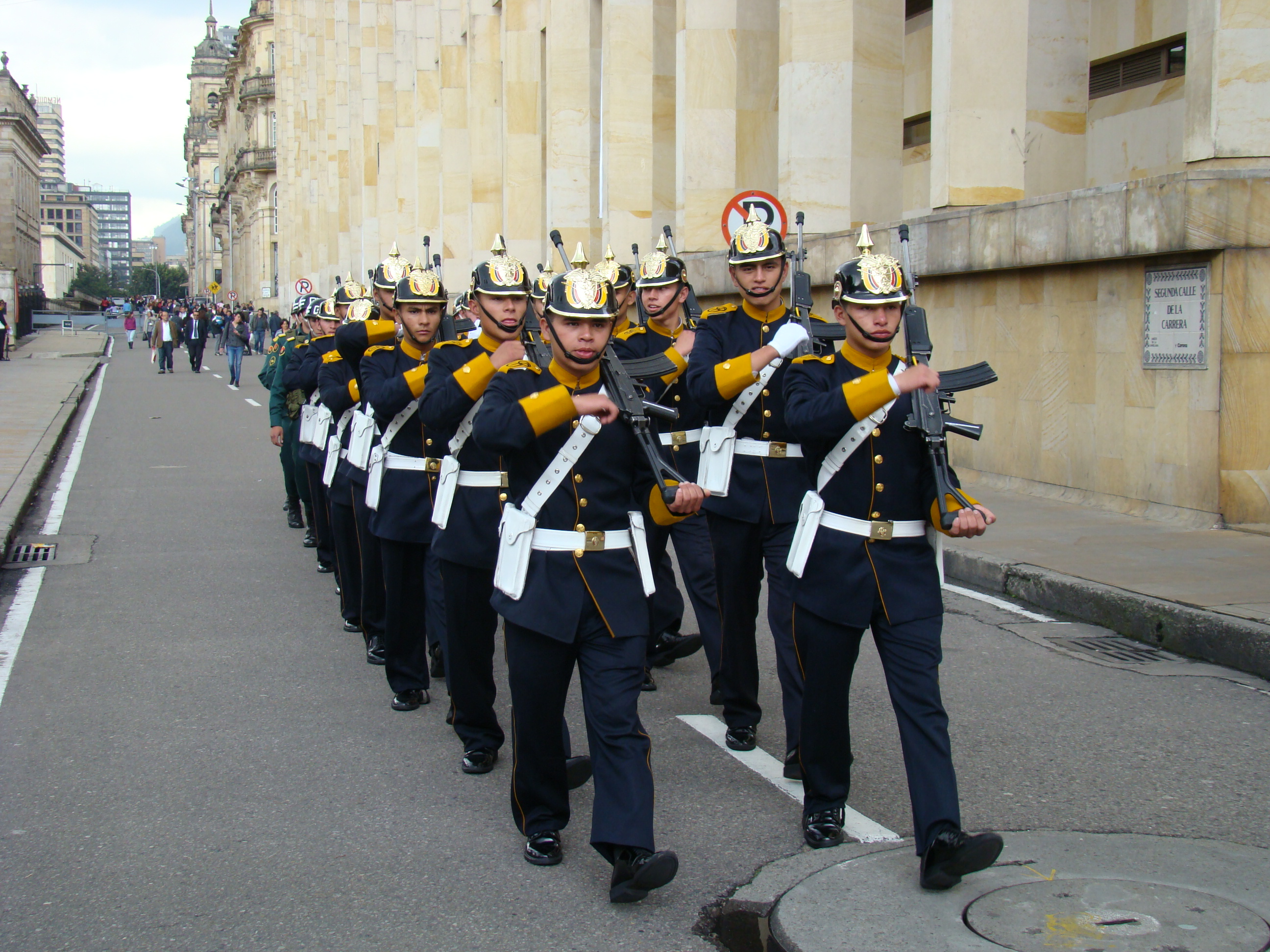
The Colombian presidential guard changing the guard

On December 7, 1927, President Miguel Abadía Méndez signed a decree, officially forming the Presidential Guard. On August 16, 1928, the battalion was given its current name, with its first commander being Lieutenant Colonel Roberto Perea Sanclemente. Memorable actions of this battalion are remembered such as the protection given to the president during the violent acts of the Bogotazo (April 9, 1948) and during the Palace of Justice Siege on November 6, 1985. Resolution 3446 of August 17, 1955, created the medallion “Guardia Presidencial” and Decree 1880 of 1988 ruled the award merits for this prize given to the distinguished members of the battalion for their loyalty, service and good behavior.

Since August 16, 1928, the security of the president has been in the hands of the Presidential Guard, who also has the mission of maintaining the security of the president, his family and his official residence, the Casa de Nariño. Since 1958 it was given to the Presidential Guard Battalion, a sui generis organization in the National Army, with a representation of the four arms and its units were called Infantry, Cavalry, Artillery and Engineers.

== See also ==
- List of presidents of Colombia
