= State and royal cars of Japan =

Since 1905

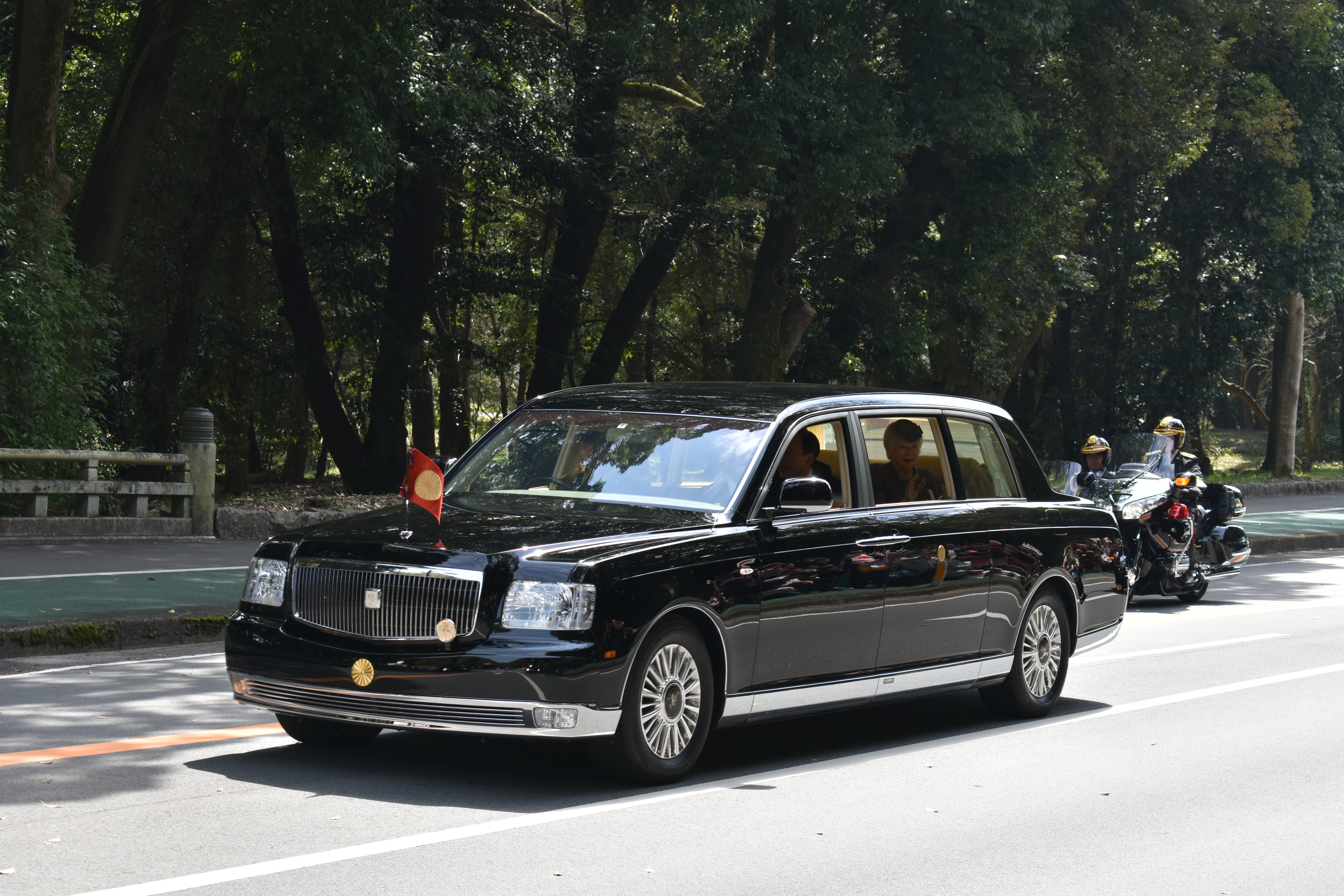
The G51 Imperial Toyota Century Royal delivered in 2006 during a procession in Tokyo in 2019

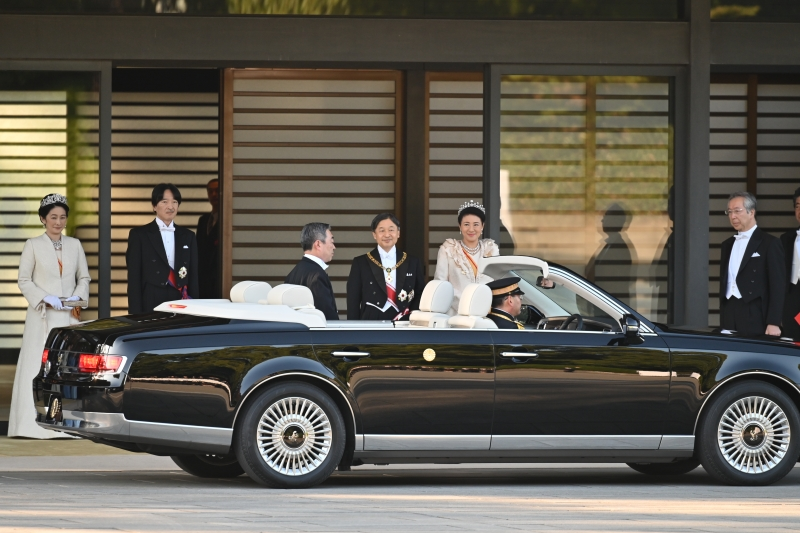
Naruhito's G60 Century Convertible at the South Porch of the Imperial Palace (2019)

The official state cars (御料車, goryosha) currently used by the Emperor and Empress of Japan are specially prepared G51 Toyota Century Royal limousines (four $500,000 custom cars delivered in 2006) and a hybrid G60 Toyota Century convertible parade car built specifically for Naruhito's enthronement in 2019.

The primary car used by the emperor and empress is referred to as "Empress 1". Two of the Century Royals are assigned to the Ministry of Foreign Affairs for use by visiting dignitaries and foreign heads of state. A fourth body has been specially modified as a hearse for use in Imperial funerals, last used for Princess Mikasa.

The Emperor and Empress are typically accompanied by staff and security in Toyota Crowns and standard Toyota Century vehicles. The Emperor and Emperess Emeritus Akihito and Michiko also primarily travel in an armoured, standard body third generation G60 Toyota Century, known as "Empress 8".

== Current vehicles ==
Custom built by Toyota, the G51 limousines are 20 feet (6.1 m) long, 6.5 feet (2.0 m) wide, and weighs 6,440 pounds (2,920 kg). Special features include seating for 8, bulletproofing, and a granite entryway.

The custom one-off G60 convertible features a rear seat raised 40 millimetres (1.6 in) higher than the sedan for greater parade visibility.

== History ==
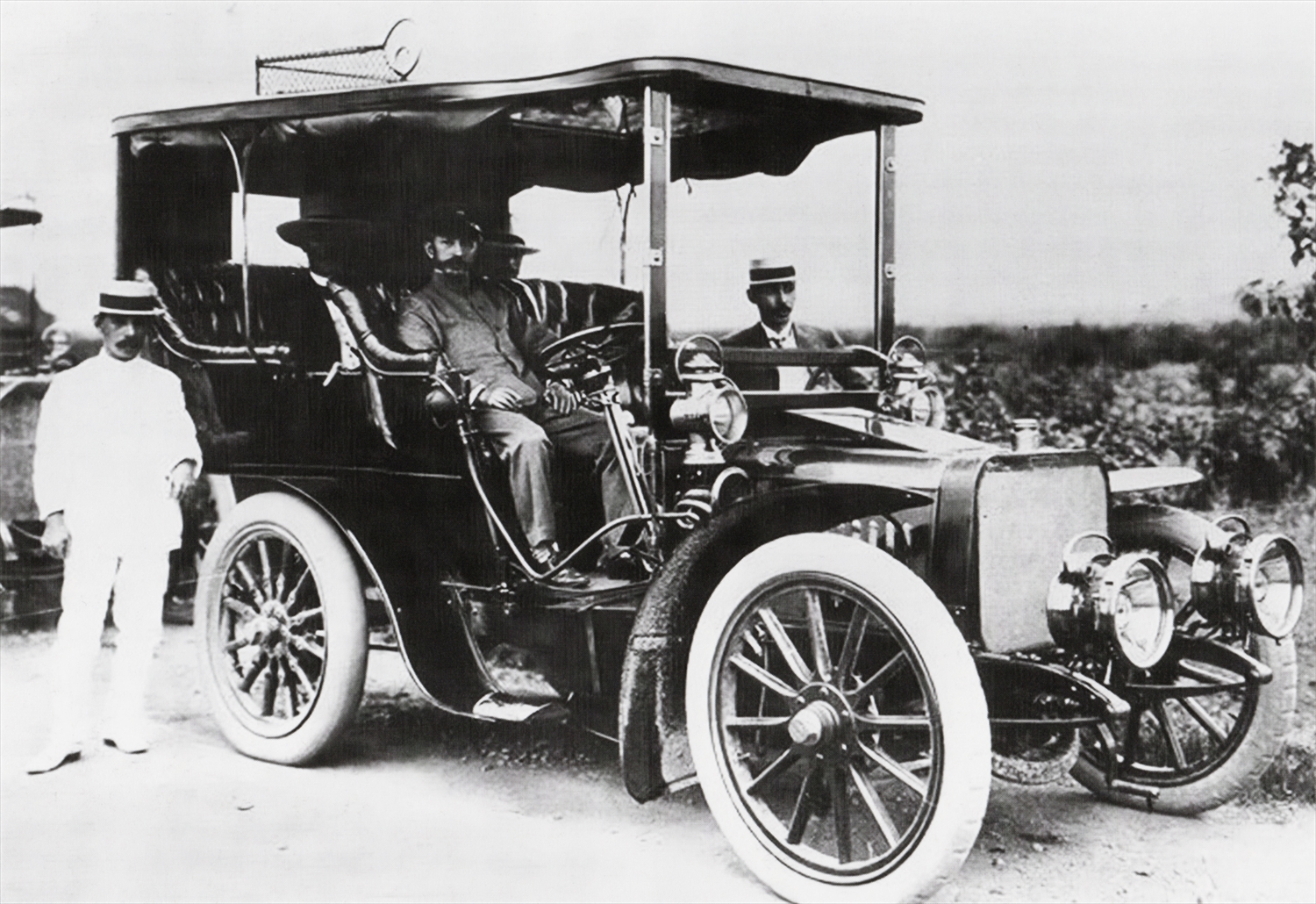
Prince Arisugawa's 1905 Darracq (1908)

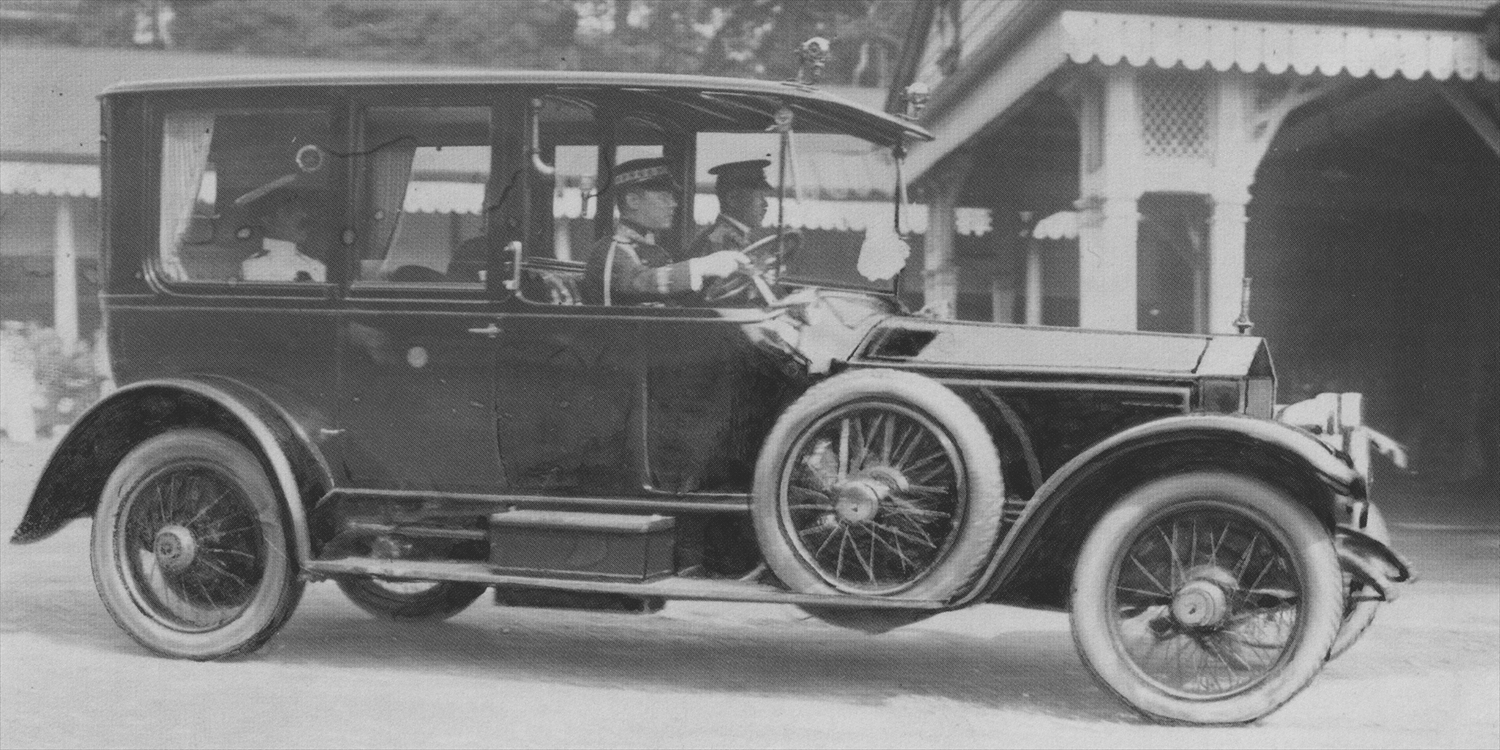
Emperor Taisho's 1920 Rolls-Royce Silver Ghost (1922)

Prince Arisugawa Takehito was an early proponent of the automobile, becoming the first member of the Imperial family to purchase, own, and drive a car himself, returning from a European tour representing Japan at the wedding of Crown Prince Wilhelm of Germany in 1905 with a French made Darracq. As tutor to the Crown Prince Yoshihito (later Emperor Taishō), he visited the Imperial Palace and helped convince his uncle, the Emperor Meiji of the practicality of the automobile.

The Emperor Meiji gave his approval for the introduction of an official Imperial automobile in 1910 following a state visit by the Guangxu Emperor's brother Zaitao, and an expected visit by Prince Wilhelm the following year. He ordered his European ambassadors to research which cars were being used by other royal families, and chose to order the same car then being used by King George V, a six-cylinder, 9.4 liter, 57.2 horsepower Daimler Landley Landaulet, delivered on 10 March 1913.

Over the years, emperors have been transported in a variety of vehicles, including the Daimler Landleys (1913–1927), Rolls-Royce Silver Ghosts (1921–1936), Mercedes-Benz 770s W07 Series (1932–1968), Cadillac Series 75s (1951–1970), Rolls-Royce Silver Wraiths (1957–1987), Rolls-Royce Phantom Vs (1961–1990), Nissan Prince Royals (1967–2008), Nissan Presidents (1989-2003), and previous models of the Century (1989–present).

Naruhito's father, Emperor Akihito, used a 1990 Rolls-Royce Corniche as a parade car for his enthronement ceremony 1989, while it was fitting that Emperor Hirohito was transported in a Nissan Prince Royal hearse for his funeral, as the Imperial automobile that most defined the Showa era was Prince Royal. Emperor Akihito, who is also known for owning a Honda Integra as a personal car, eschewed the ostentatious limousines for daily transportation, and requested the use of more understated stock appearing (but bulletproof) Nissan President and Toyota Century sedans for non-official use.

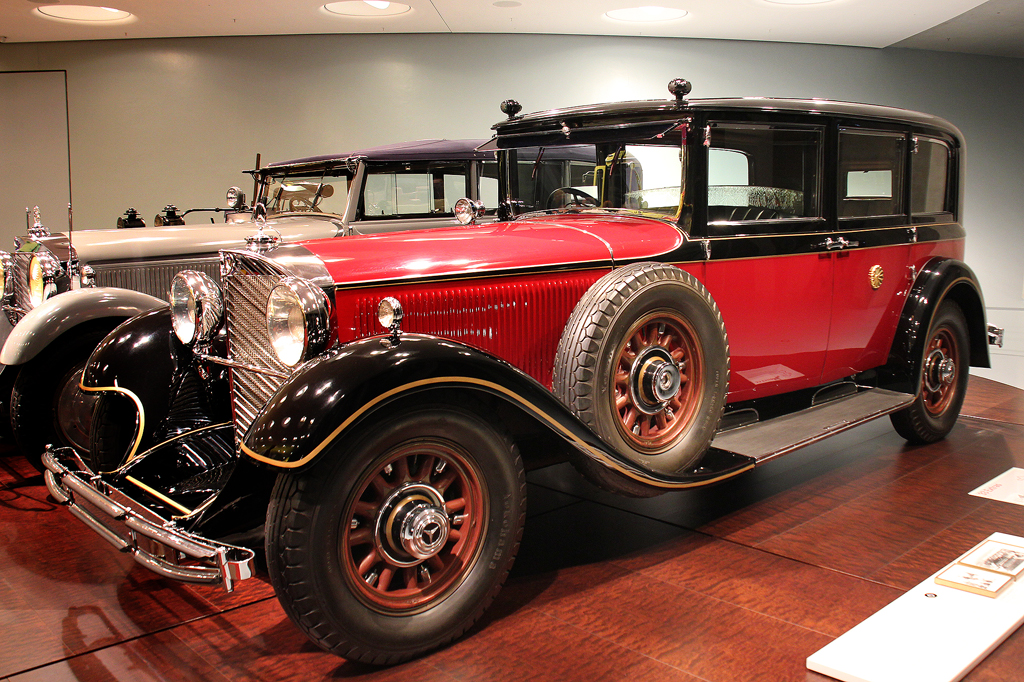
Imperial Mercedes 770 at the Mercedes-Benz Museum in Stutttgart (2011), showing the red pre-World War II livery of the Imperial automotive fleet

The Imperial Household Agency has preserved versions of the Nissan Prince Royal, Rolls-Royce Phantom V, Silver Wraith, Mercedes-Benz 770, the Rolls-Royce Corniche, as well as a Packard Super Eight used as a staff chase vehicle. Additionally, Prince Royal No. 3 is on display at the National Showa Memorial Museum, and an Imperial Mercedes-Benz 770 is on display at the Mercedes-Benz Museum in Stuttgart.

== Livery ==
Vehicles up to the Mercedes-Benz 770 were painted in red, the traditional color of the imperial carriages. The paint was a maroon color that changed hue depending on the weather, from a bright vermilion on sunny days to a deep wine red on cloudy days.

The post-war Cadillac 75s retained their original modest gray paint as being more appropriate for the era, and the Rolls-Royce vehicles introduced around the same time were also all painted jet black. All subsequent Imperial cars have since been painted in black.

There are four chrysanthemum crests mounted on every Imperial car, one on the front, rear, and on each side of the rear door.

The Imperial Household Agency is responsible for maintaining the imperial fleet, which includes the horse-drawn state coach and carriages, used for ceremonial events and the presentation of credentials by ambassadors, one of only a few nations that still maintain them.

== Prime Minister ==
Since 2020, the prime minister of Japan also travels in an armored hybrid G60 Toyota Century, along with the UVF-46 Lexus LS 600h L acquired in 2008, the latter of which is now used as a spare/alternative vehicle to the newer Century. In 2026, the Japanese government switched to a Century SUV-style vehicle for the Prime Minister’s official car.

== See also ==
- Japanese Air Force One
- Prime Minister's Official Car (Japan)
- State coach
- Royal transport in Thailand
- State and royal cars of the United Kingdom
