= Executive Transport Wing (German Air Force) =

Executive Transport Wing of the Federal Ministry of Defence
- Flugbereitschaft des Bundesministeriums der Verteidigung
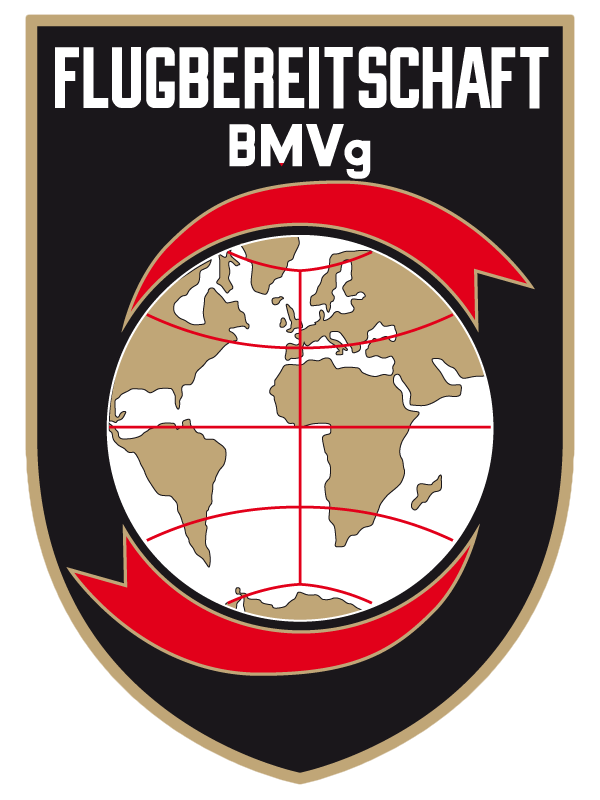
- Founded: 1 April 1957; 69 years ago
- Country: Germany
- Branch: German Air Force
- Role: Air transport
- Part of: Air Force Forces Command (Luftwaffentruppenkommando)
- Garrison/HQ: Cologne/Bonn, Berlin-Tegel, Berlin/Brandenburg

Aircraft flown
- Transport: Formerly: A340, B707, Tu-154, VFW 614, HFB 320, L-410, Mi-8, A310; Present: A350, A321, A319, AS532

The Executive Transport Wing of the Federal Ministry of Defence (German: Flugbereitschaft des Bundesministeriums der Verteidigung, (Note: lit. 'Flight readiness [service] of the Federal Ministry of Defence') abbr.: FlBschftBMVg or FBS BMVg) is a flying formation of the German Air Force with a wide variety of tasks. Occasionally it is ambiguously listed as the Special Air Missions Wing in English language articles. The wing is based at Cologne Bonn Airport with Berlin Brandenburg Airport used as a location for its helicopters. It is planned to bring the two operating locations together at Berlin Brandenburg Airport.

== History ==
The Flugbereitschaft was formed On 1 April 1957, at the Nörvenich Air Base as a small unit providing liaison flights to the Defence Ministry. In July 1959 it relocated to Cologne Bonn Airport and reformed as the 3. Squadron of the Air Force's Transport Wing 62 (3./LTG-62). In April 1963 it became an independent unit with its status raised from a squadron to a group. In 1974 its status was upgraded to a full wing (Geschwader).

As a legacy from the Second World War the role of the German military was a very sensitive topic and the Bundeswehr was constituted as a strictly defensive force within the borders of West Germany. Correspondingly the Flugbereitschaft was limited to providing government transport to federal government of defence ministry officials. With the end of the Cold War, the German reunification and the country's increased involvement in peacekeeping and humanitarian aid missions overseas at the end of the twentieth and the beginning of the twenty-first centuries came a need for air-to-air refueling and long range transport aircraft.

With the addition of Airbus A310 MRTT to the Flugbereitschaft an informal distinction was introduced for its aircraft. The government transport aircraft are called the "white fleet" (die weiße Flotte), painted in white with a thin black-red-gold stripe and a Bundesrepublik Deutschland (Federal Republic of Germany) inscription. The military transport and tanker aircraft are called the "grey fleet" (die graue Flotte), painted in grey with a Luftwaffe (German Air Force) inscription. The helicopters make an exception of this rule, sporting the retro look of the white fleet, with two tones of blue stripes on a white body and a Luftwaffe inscription. The grey fleet is subordinated to the European Air Transport Command.

West Germany had its capital in Bonn, while East Germany's capital was Berlin. With the reunification it was decided that Berlin will be the sole capital city of the country. As the institutions of the united Germany were based on the West-German ones in Bonn and could not be moved in short time, the Flugbereitschaft played an important role executing shuttle flights (Pendelflüge) for federal government officials and parliamentarians between the two cities. Additionally the wing keeps a VIP aircraft in flight readiness in Berlin detached to from its MOB at Cologne Bonn IAP. The German government and Federal Ministry of Defence plan to consolidate the wing at Berlin Brandenburg Airport.

On 15 June 2022, the wing retired its last Airbus A310 MRTT. The retirement was scheduled at the end of February 2022, but the aircraft was kept in service due to the 2022 Russian invasion of Ukraine.

== Mission ==
The Flugbereitschaft carries out missions in the following areas:

- Air Transport:
  - transport of Bundeswehr personnel and materiel
  - VIP transport of government officials, members of parliament and high-ranking Bundeswehr officers
  - humanitarian aid and disaster relief flights, evacuation of civilians
  - MedEvac flights
- Air-to-Air Refueling:
  - formation and training of tanker air crews, operational refueling flights in support of Luftwaffe and allied fighter jets
  - strategic deployment of Bundeswehr and allied forces for exercises and operations
  - participation in international NATO-led exercises
- Passenger and Cargo Handling, Logistic Support
  - passenger control and preparation
  - cargo handling for own, allied and civilian-chartered aircraft, supply of Bundeswehr forces overseas
  - ground support of German and allied aircraft
- Maintenance and Overhaul:
  - technical maintenance and overhaul of the Einsatzbereitschaft's fleet
  - training and skill development of flight and ground personnel
- Host Nation Support:
  - transport of foreign dignitaries and high-ranking officials on official state visits to Germany
  - ground support of foreign official state aircraft of visiting official delegations
  - ground support for foreign delegations at Cologne Bonn Airport and Berlin Brandenburg Airport

== Organisation ==
Operating locations of the Executive Transport Wing

The Flugbereitschaft operates a diverse fleet of aircraft. Its main operating base is the military area of Cologne Bonn Airport with Berlin Brandenburg Airport used as a secondary location for its helicopters.

Beginning on 21 October 2020, two years after completion and two weeks after a successful dress rehearsal, political-parliamentary flight operations officially began at the new government interim terminal at the new Berlin Brandenburg Airport. The facility can handle up to 25 official flights per day. However, it is only a temporary terminal. The final terminal is due to be built in 2034, so that the unit's entire fleet of aircraft can move from Cologne-Wahn airport. Cougar helicopters moved from the former Berlin Tegel Airport to Berlin Brandenburg Airport in October 2025.

Executive Transport Wing of the Federal Ministry of Defence (Flugbereitschaft des Bundesministeriums der Verteidigung) (Cologne Bonn Airport)

- Wing Headquarters
- Flight Group (Fliegende Gruppe)
  - Flight Group Headquarters
  - 1st Air Transport Squadron (1. Lufttransportstaffel) ('grey fleet')
    - 2x Airbus A321LR 15+10, 15+11
  - 2nd Air Transport Squadron (2. Lufttransportstaffel) ('white fleet')
    - 3x Airbus A350-941 10+01 "Konrad Adenauer", 10+02 "Theodor Heuss", 10+03 "Kurt Schumacher"
    - 1x Airbus A321-231 15+04 (ex. Neustadt an der Weinstraße D-AISE of Lufthansa)
    - 3x Airbus A319-133X CJ (15+01 - 15+03)
    - 3x Bombardier Global Express 5000 (14+02 - 14+04)
    - 3x Bombardier Global Express 6000 (14+05 - 14+07)
  - 3rd Air Transport Squadron (3. Lufttransportstaffel) ('white fleet') (Berlin Brandenburg Airport)
    - 3x Eurocopter AS 532U2 Cougar (82+01 - 82+03)
- Technical Group (Technische Gruppe)
  - Technical Group Headquarters
  - 1st Technical Squadron (1. Technische Staffel) (maintains Airbus A310)
  - 2nd Technical Squadron (2. Technische Staffel) (maintains Airbus A319CJ, A321 and Bombardier G5000)
  - Airfield Squadron (Flugplatzstaffel)

Due to the geographical detachment of the 3. Air Transport Squadron from the wing's main operating location at Cologne Bonn IAP and due to the specifics of its helicopter operations, the squadron is an integrated unit, which also includes ground technical personnel in addition to its air crews.

== Aircraft ==
Clear visual distinction between the white and the grey fleet
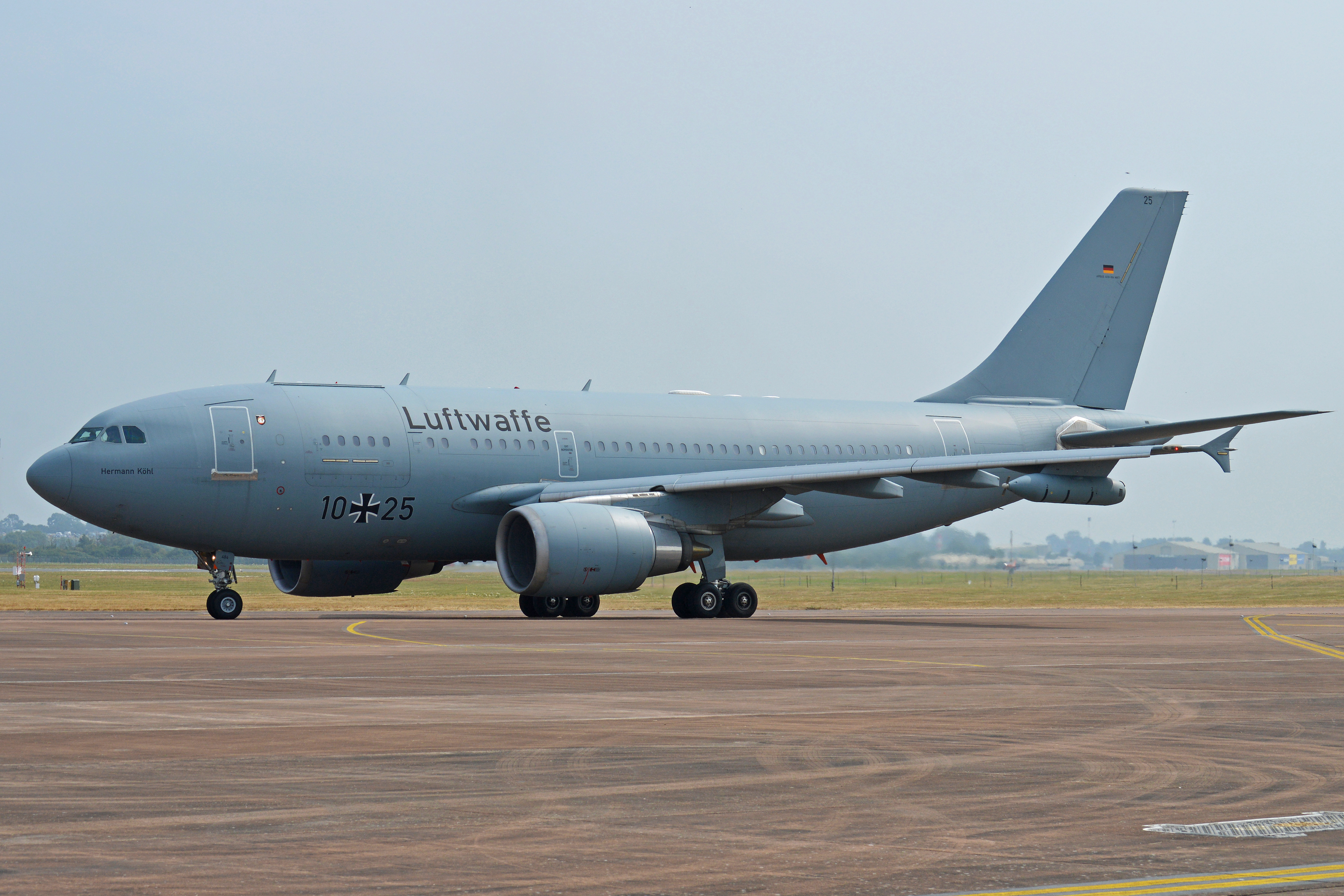
Retired Airbus A310 MRTT nr. 10+25 of the grey fleet

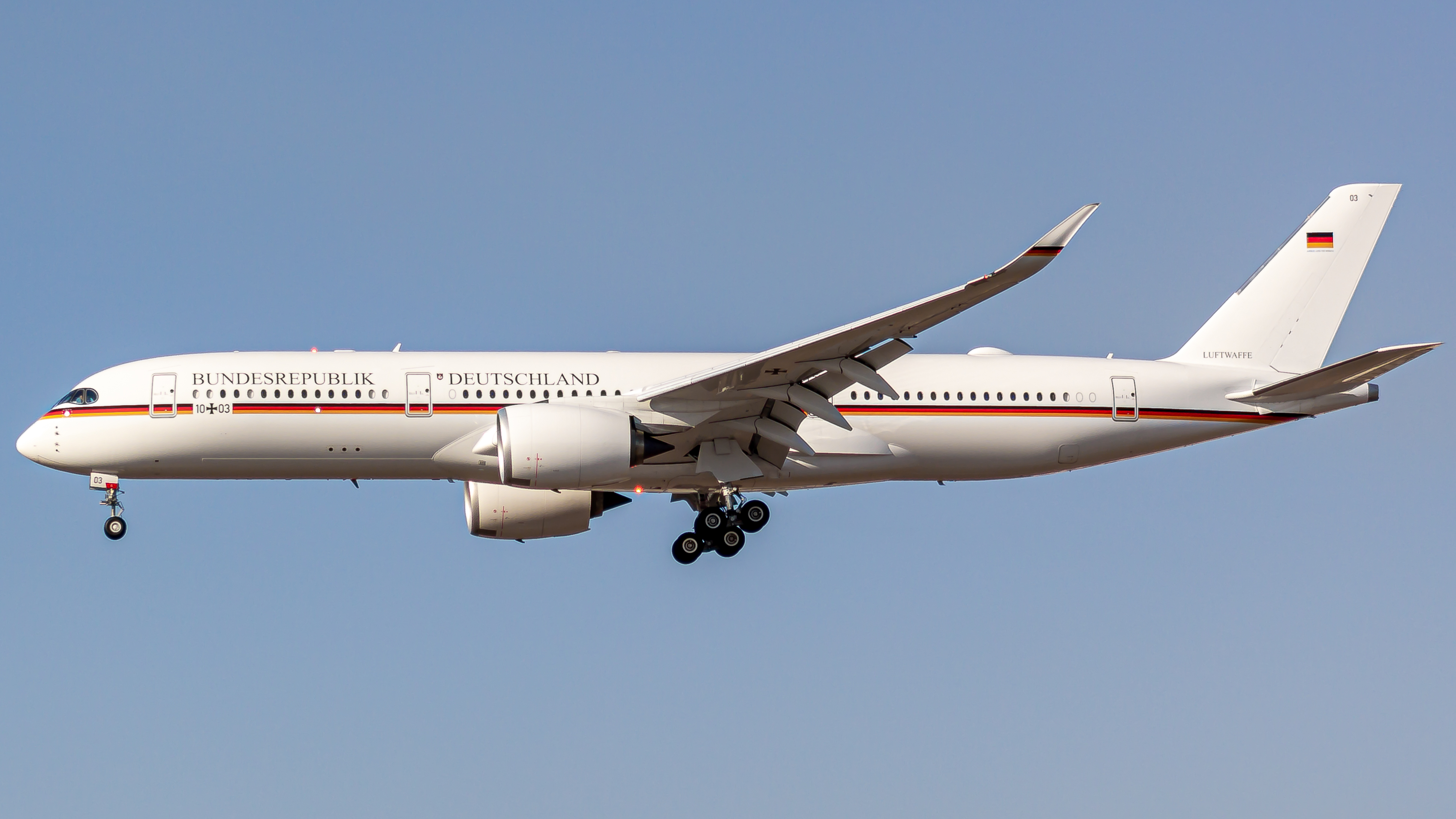
Airbus A350 nr. 10+03 of the white fleet

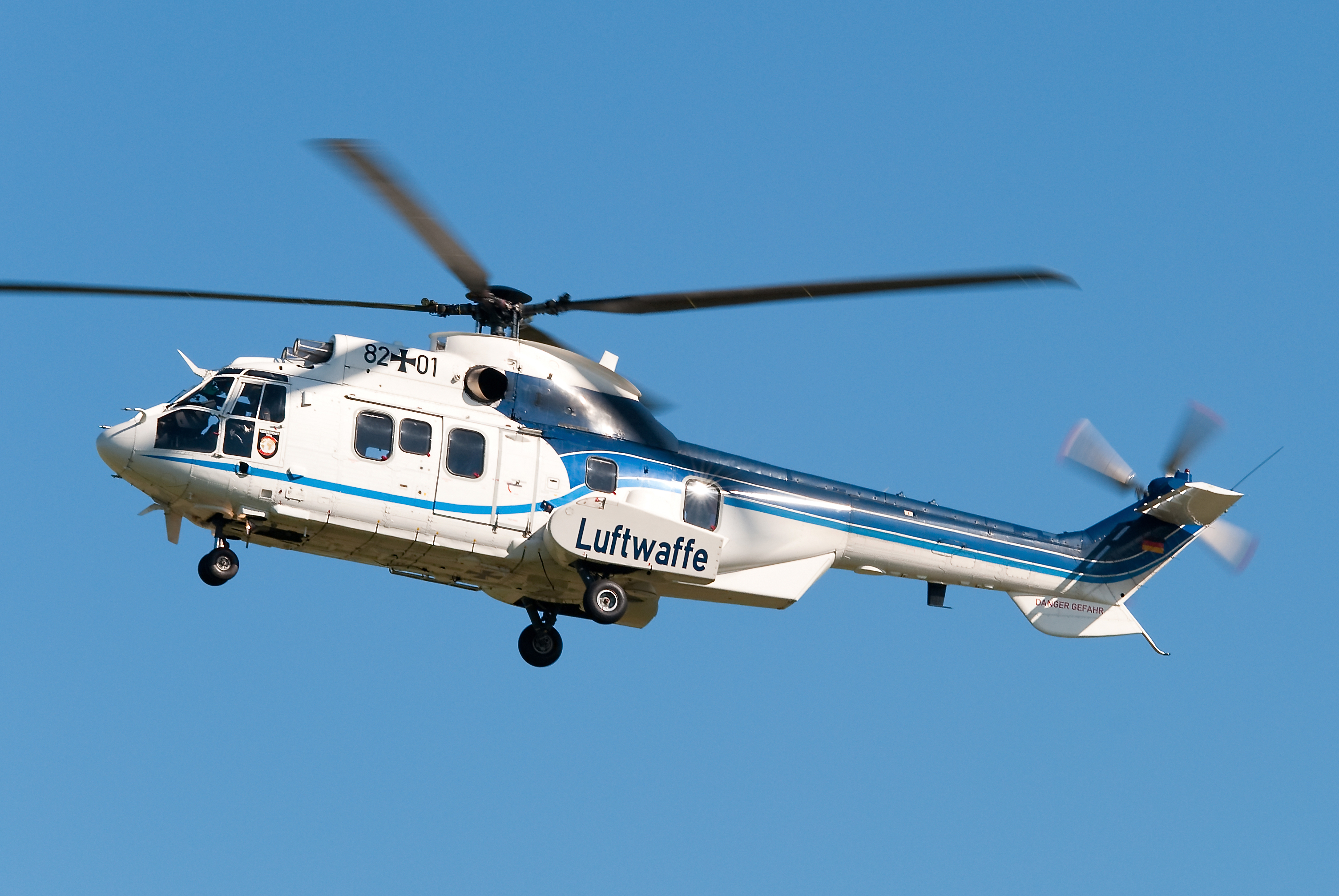
Eurocopter AS 532U2 nr. 82+01 of the white fleet

=== Current fleet ===
Image	Aircraft	Variant	Origin	Type	Quantity	In service since	Registration / designation	Notes
Military Transport Airplanes (1st Air Transport Squadron)
	Airbus A321neo	A321LR	France Germany	MEDEVAC Medical evacuation	2	Jun 2022	15+10	
	Airbus A321neo	A321LR	France Germany	MEDEVAC Medical evacuation	2	Aug 2022	15+11	
Executive Transport Airplanes (2nd Air Transport Squadron)
	Airbus A350-900	A350-941	FranceGermany	Long range governmental air transport	3	Nov 2022	10+01 Konrad Adenauer	
	Airbus A350-900	A350-941	FranceGermany	Long range governmental air transport	3	Mar 2023	10+02 Theodor Heuss	
	Airbus A350-900	A350-941	FranceGermany	Long range governmental air transport	3	Jan 2021	10+03 Kurt Schumacher	
	Airbus A321	A321-231	FranceGermany	Medium range governmental air transport	1	Dec 2018	15+04	Second-hand aircraft, formerly the D-AISE of Lufthansa.
	Airbus A319	A319-133X CJ	France Germany	Medium range governmental air transport	2	2010	15+01	
	Airbus A319	A319-133X CJ	France Germany	Medium range governmental air transport	2	2010	15+02	
	Airbus A319	A319OH Offener Himmel	France Germany	Reconnaissance aircraft for the Open Skies treaty	1	Jun 2019	15+03	Formerly an A319-133X CJ. Second-hand aircraft, formerly the VP-CVX of Volkswagen Air Service.
	Bombardier Global 6000	—	Canada	Short and medium range governmental air transport	3	Sep 2019	14+05	
	Bombardier Global 6000	—	Canada	Short and medium range governmental air transport	3	Nov 2019	14+06	
	Bombardier Global 6000	—	Canada	Short and medium range governmental air transport	3	Dec 2019	14+07	
	Bombardier Global 5000	—	Canada	Short and medium range governmental air transport	3	Sep 2011	14+02	
	Bombardier Global 5000	—	Canada	Short and medium range governmental air transport	3	2011	14+03	
	Bombardier Global 5000	—	Canada	Short and medium range governmental air transport	3	2011	14+04	
Executive Transport Helicopters (3rd Air Transport Squadron)
	Eurocopter AS532	AS532 U2	France	VIP transport	3	1997	82+01	Used for the transport of the federal government in the Berlin area. Planned to be replaced from 2027.
	Eurocopter AS532	AS532 U2	France	VIP transport	3	1997	82+02	Used for the transport of the federal government in the Berlin area. Planned to be replaced from 2027.
	Eurocopter AS532	AS532 U2	France	VIP transport	3	1997	82+03	Used for the transport of the federal government in the Berlin area. Planned to be replaced from 2027.

=== Retired fleet ===
==== Airplanes ====
Picture	Type	Service Period	Quantity	Serials	Notes
	De Havilland DH.114 Heron 2D	1957–1963	2	CA+001, CA+002	
	Piaggio P.149	1957–1969	?		
	Percival Pembroke C54	1958–1968	?		
	Dornier Do 27	1958–1979	?		
	Convair CV-440	1959–1973	6	12+01 - 12+06	Originally CA+031 - CA+036.
	Dornier Do 28A-1	1961–1968	1	CA+041	
	Douglas DC-6	1962–1969	4	13+01 - 13+04	Originally first two a/c numbered CA+034 and CA+035, later renumbered CA+021 and CA+022. Third and fourth a/c numbered CA+023, CA+024.
	Lockheed JetStar C-140A/B	1963–1986	3 (+1)	11+01 - 11+03	Originally CA+101 - CA+103. Fourth a/c acquired in 1968 as attrition replacement for CA+102 and numbered 11+02.
	Boeing B707-307C	1968–1999	4	10+01 - 10+04	
	HFB 320M Hansa Jet	1969–1988	8	16+01 - 16+08	
	Dornier Do 28D-1	1971–1988	4	59+01 - 59+04	
	VFW 614	1977–1998	3	17+01 - 17+03	
	Bombardier Challenger 601	1986–2011	7	12+01 - 12+07	
	Tupolev Tu-154M	1991–1999	2	11+01 - 11+02	ex-East-German Air Force VIP aircraft.
	Ilyushin Il-62	1991–1993	3	11+20 - 11+22	ex-East-German Air Force VIP aircraft.
	Let L-410	1991–2000	4	53+09 - 53+12	ex-East-German Air Force VIP aircraft.
	Airbus A310 MRT	1991–2021	1	10+23	"Kurt Schumacher", formerly Airbus A310-304 DDR-ABC, later D-AOAC of Interflug
	Airbus A310	1993–2013	2	10+21 - 10+22	ex-East-German government aircraft.
	Airbus A310 MRTT	2007–2021	4	10+24	"Otto Lilienthal", formerly Airbus A310-304 D-AIDA of Lufthansa
	Airbus A310 MRTT	1999–2022	4	10+25	"Hermann Köhl", formerly Airbus A310-304 D-AIDB of Lufthansa
	Airbus A310 MRTT	2001–2021	4	10+26	"Hans Grade", formerly Airbus A310-304 "Speyer" D-AIDE of Lufthansa
	Airbus A310 MRTT	2001–2021	4	10+27	"August Euler", formerly Airbus A310-304 "Fellbach" D-AIDI of Lufthansa
	Airbus A340	2011–2023	2	16+01	Airbus A340-313X VIP, "Konrad Adenauer" previously "Leipzig" D-AIGR of Lufthansa
	Airbus A340	2011–2023	2	16+02	Airbus A340-313X VIP, "Theodor Heuss" previously "Gummersbach" D-AIFB of Lufthansa, sold to the United States
	Bombardier Global Express 5000	2011–2019	1	14+01	Crashed on 16 April 2019 at Berlin Schönefeld Airport and was not returned to service. An investigation found improper maintenance by Lufthansa Bombardier Aviation Services to be the cause.

==== Helicopters ====
Image	Aircraft	Variant	Origin	Quantity	In service from - to	Registration / designation	Notes
Helicopters
	Bell UH-1 Iroquois	UH-1D	United States Germany (under licence)	4	1968 - 2000	70+83	Formerly in the West-German Air Force.
	Bell UH-1 Iroquois	UH-1D	United States Germany (under licence)	4	1968 - 2000	—	Formerly in the West-German Air Force.
	Bell UH-1 Iroquois	UH-1D	United States Germany (under licence)	4	1968 - 2000	71+13	Formerly in the West-German Air Force.
	Bell UH-1 Iroquois	UH-1D	United States Germany (under licence)	4	1968 - 2000	71+62	Formerly in the West-German Air Force.
	Mil Mi-8	Mil Mi-8S (Hip-C)	Soviet Union	6	1991 - 1996	93+51	Formerly in the East-German Air Force VIP fleet.
	Mil Mi-8	Mil Mi-8S (Hip-C)	Soviet Union	6	1991 - 1996	93+52	Formerly in the East-German Air Force VIP fleet.
	Mil Mi-8	Mil Mi-8S (Hip-C)	Soviet Union	6	1991 - 1996	93+53	Formerly in the East-German Air Force VIP fleet.
	Mil Mi-8	Mil Mi-8S (Hip-C)	Soviet Union	6	1991 - 1996	93+54	Formerly in the East-German Air Force VIP fleet.
	Mil Mi-8	Mil Mi-8S (Hip-C)	Soviet Union	6	1990 - 1996	93+55	Formerly in the East-German Air Force VIP fleet.
	Mil Mi-8	Mil Mi-8S (Hip-C)	Soviet Union	6	1991 - 1996	93+56	Formerly in the East-German Air Force VIP fleet.
	Sikorsky H-34	H-34G II Choctaw	United States	2	1959 - 1972	80+34	
	Sikorsky H-34	H-34G II Choctaw	United States	2	1959 - 1972	—	
	Bristol 171 Sycamore	Mk 52	United Kingdom	2	1958 - 1959	CA+327	
	Bristol 171 Sycamore	Mk 52	United Kingdom	2	1958 - 1959	CA+328	
