= Prime Minister's Official Car (Japan) =

Official car used by the Prime Minister of Japan

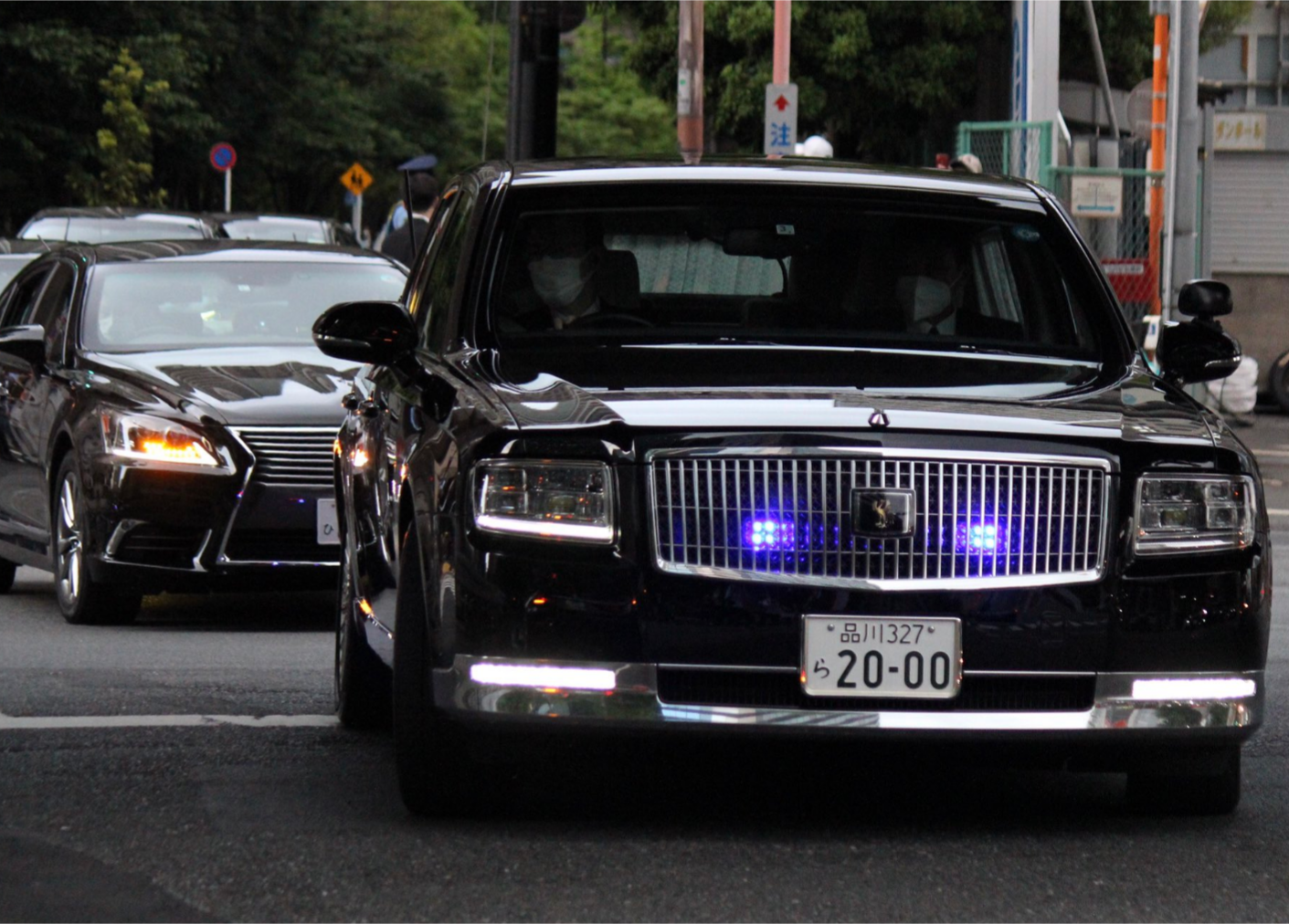
The Prime Minister's Toyota Century

The Prime Minister's Official Car (内閣総理大臣専用車, Naikaku Souri-Daijin Senyou Sha) is the official state car used by the Prime Minister of Japan. Since 2020, a G60 Toyota Century (third generation) model has been used by the Prime Minister alongside the older Lexus LS model that had been in use. The older Lexus was not scrapped, but continues to serve as a spare/alternative car to the newer Century.

== Overview ==
The official car of the Prime Minister is armored with bulletproof glass and is covered in special steel armor. Vehicles of other members of the cabinet do not have extensive armoring, as gun laws in Japan are said to be some of the world's strictest. As for the Imperial family, the Emperor may travel in armored vehicles during times when there is a large crowd or during official duties.

Unlike the presidential state car of the United States, the official car of the Prime Minister is not driven by security agents. Instead, it is driven by a staff member from the cabinet office, who also receives extensive driving training. A new driver is appointed for each Prime Minister, and the outgoing driver must resign together with the outgoing Prime Minister.

== History ==
From 1921 to 1931, the Prime Minister used a Mercedes-Benz from then-Japanese occupied Qingdao. In 1932, the official car changed to an armoured Lincoln, and that car was used by the next six Prime Ministers. However, Prime Minister Nobuyuki Abe was against using that vehicle, as he said "It was like riding in a tank". From then on, the Prime Minister's Official Car changed frequently between Buicks and Chryslers, as each Prime Minister had his own preference.

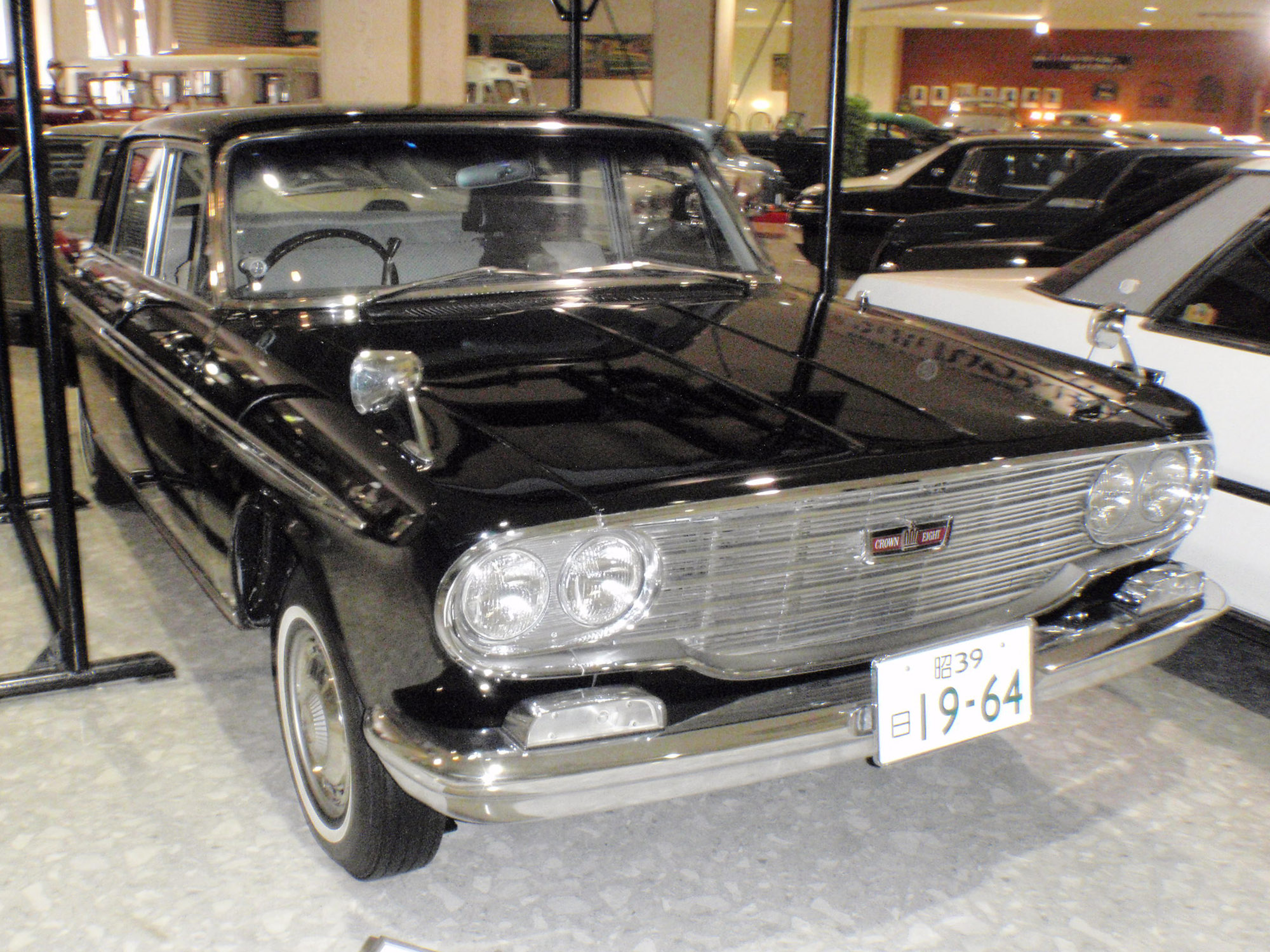
A 1964 Toyota Crown Eight

Prime Minister Hayato Ikeda was known for his austerity measures in stabilizing the economy and used an Austin A50 Cambridge. Eisaku Satō was the first to use a Japanese manufacturer, choosing Japan's first full sized V8 luxury sedan, the Toyota Crown Eight upon his election in 1964. He would also acquire a Nissan President as his official car upon its release in 1965, which were developed in a bid for use by the Imperial Household Agency. He also personally ordered an armored Toyota Century when they were released in 1967. Whether or not the assassination of John F. Kennedy had anything to do with his decision is unknown.

Future generations of the Century and the President would continue to serve as the official cars for the next 40 years until 2008, when the Japanese government changed the official car to the hybrid Lexus LS, in line with its environmental policies and push to halve its then emissions by 2030, and become net zero by 2050. In addition to having a comparable level of luxury and safety as the Toyota Century, the Lexus LS offered significantly lower fuel consumption and lower CO_{2} emissions.

In 2020, the Japanese government returned to the latest version of the Toyota Century with its adoption of a hybrid motor as the Prime Minister's Official Car. The older Lexus LS ordered in 2008 was not replaced or scrapped, but continues to serve as a spare/alternative vehicle for the Japanese Prime Minister.

In 2026, the Cabinet Office upgraded the official vehicle for Prime Minister Sanae Takaichi to a Century SUV model.

== See also ==
- State and royal cars of Japan
