= Flag of the president of Colombia =

Flag of the president of Colombia

The flag of the president of Colombia consists, like the flag of Colombia, of a rectangle in yellow, blue and red triband in a 2:1:1 ratio, meaning three horizontal stripes, with yellow at the top occupying half the width of the flag, blue at the bottom. middle occupying a quarter of the width and red below, occupying the last quarter, finished off in the central part with the coat of arms of Colombia.

The Color and Flag of the President of Colombia shall consist of three horizontal bands, with yellow occupying half of the upper part, and the other two colors the other half, divided into equal bands, blue in the center and red in the lower part, as well as the Coat of Arms in the central part. The proportions of the elements of the Coat of Arms will be in direct relation to the hoisting, and the flight will vary according to the customs of the military and naval services.

== Early presidential flags ==
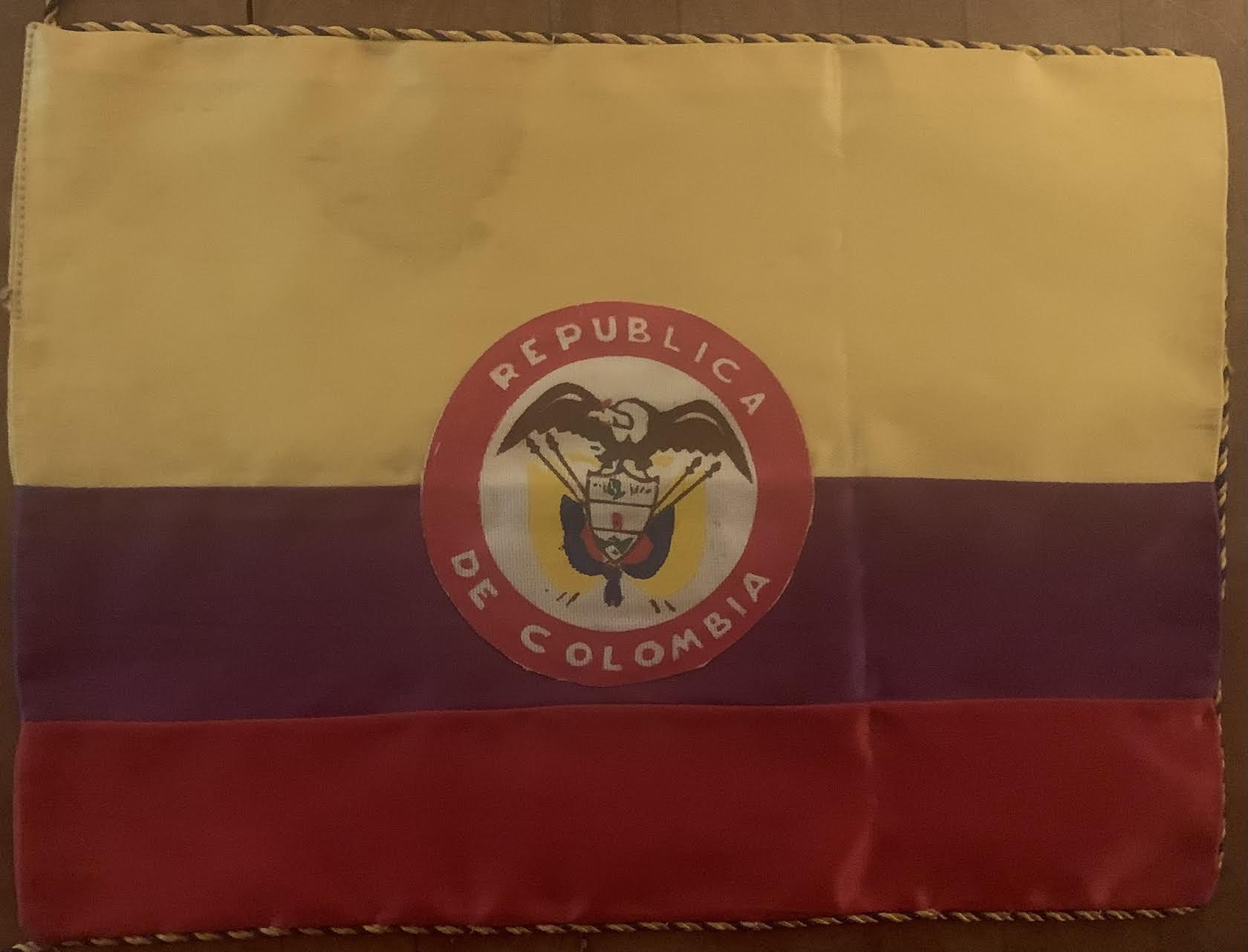
Presidential flag pre-1991

The first record of the adoption of a presidential flag dates back to 9 November 1949, when the use of the presidential flag was established through the constitution, the official flag will be a standardized version of the national flag using the coat of arms of the Republic of Colombia.

=== Presidential flag (1861–1890) ===
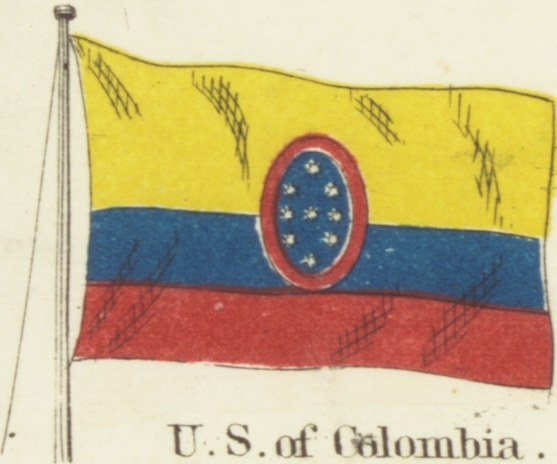
Presidential flag of the United States of Colombia

The presidential flag of the United States was composed of the traditional colors with a central obalo on a blue background, composed of 9 8-pointed stars, this flag also served as a merchant flag.

=== Presidential flag (2002–2010) ===
Flag used between 2002 and 2014

Over the past 15 years, two governments have sequentially discontinued the original design of the presidential flag, replacing the Colombian coat of arms with the Coat of Arms, a version of the current coat of arms enclosed in a red circle and bearing the inscriptions Republica de Colombia. and the motto Libertad y Orden.

Within the marked changes of the Uribe administration, one of the most visible changes was the incorporation of an almost exclusive design of the presidential flag, making use in this time of war in Colombia, a standardized version of the shield of arms for exclusive use by the armed forces.

=== Presidential flag (2010–2014) ===
During this period, the administration of President Santos kept some of the changes of the past administration, one of them without a doubt was the presidential flag, which was also used in protocol events, in addition to the use of similar designs to identify some state entity, with the use of the coat of arms enclosed in red, identifying the corresponding entity.

== Current flag ==
The current flag makes use of the coat of arms alone, without the incorrect use of red border and inscriptions on it, as established by the constitution.

== See also ==
- Flag of Colombia
- President of Colombia
- Coat of arms of Colombia
