= Ishikawa Aviation Plaza =

- 石川県立航空プラザ
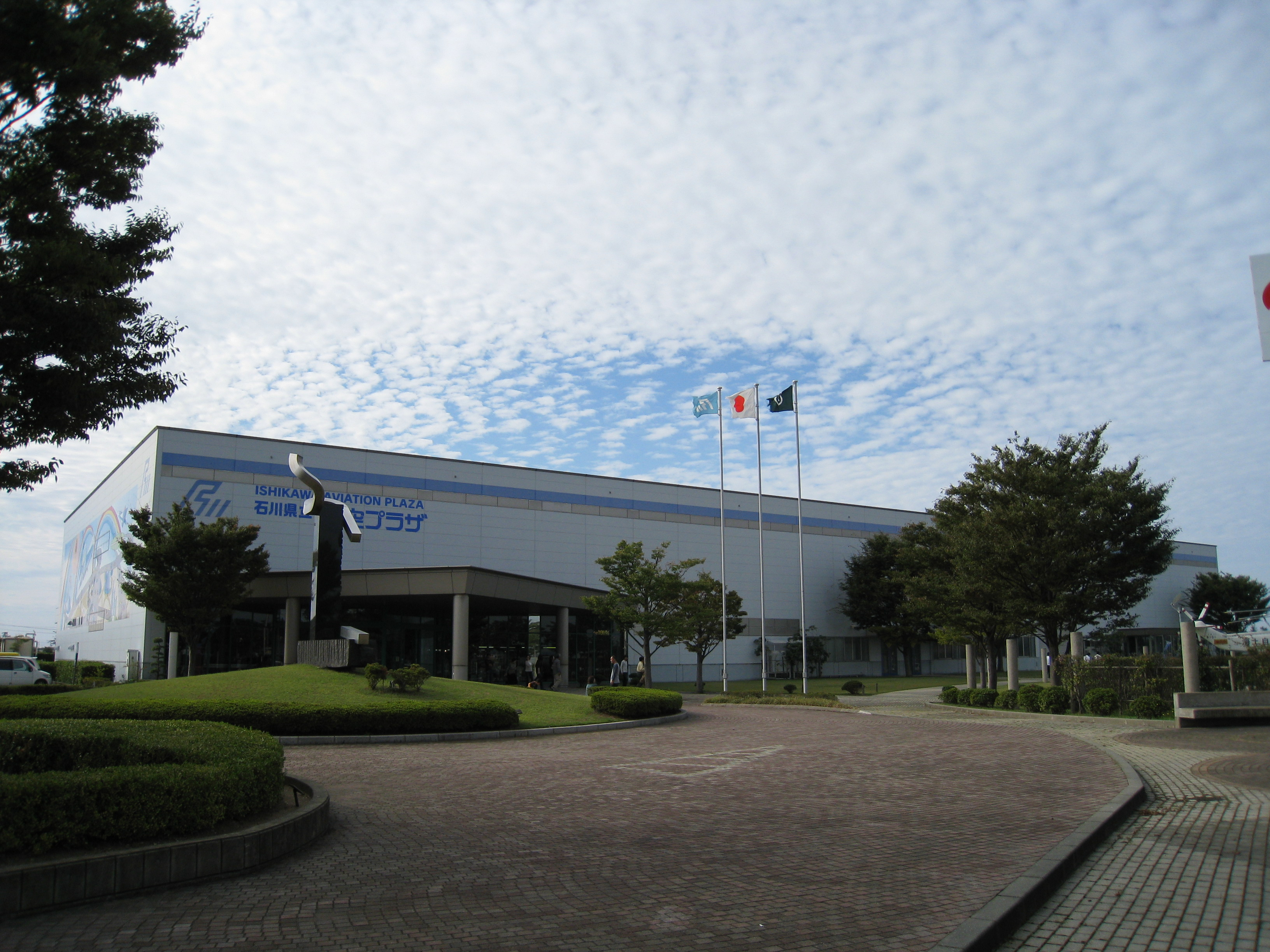
- Interactive map of the Ishikawa Aviation Plaza area

General information
- Location: Komatsu, Ishikawa Prefecture, Japan
- Coordinates: 36.4044°N 136.4107°E

Ishikawa Aviation Plaza (石川県立航空プラザ, ishikawakenritsu kouku puraza) is an aerospace museum in the city of Komatsu, Ishikawa Prefecture, Japan. It is located next to Komatsu Airport.

== Aircraft on display ==
- Sikorsky S-61 (HSS-2B)
- Fuji KM-2
- F-104J Starfighter
- Lockheed T-33A
- Pilatus PC-6 Porter
- Dornier Do 28
- Hughes OH-6J Cayuse
- Hughes TH-55J Osage
- Beechcraft E33 Bonanza
- Bell 47G
- Mitsubishi F-2 (mockup)
- Mitsubishi T-2
- Pitts Special S-2B

== See also ==
- List of aviation museums
