= Colombian Air Force One =

FAC aircraft carrying the Colombian president

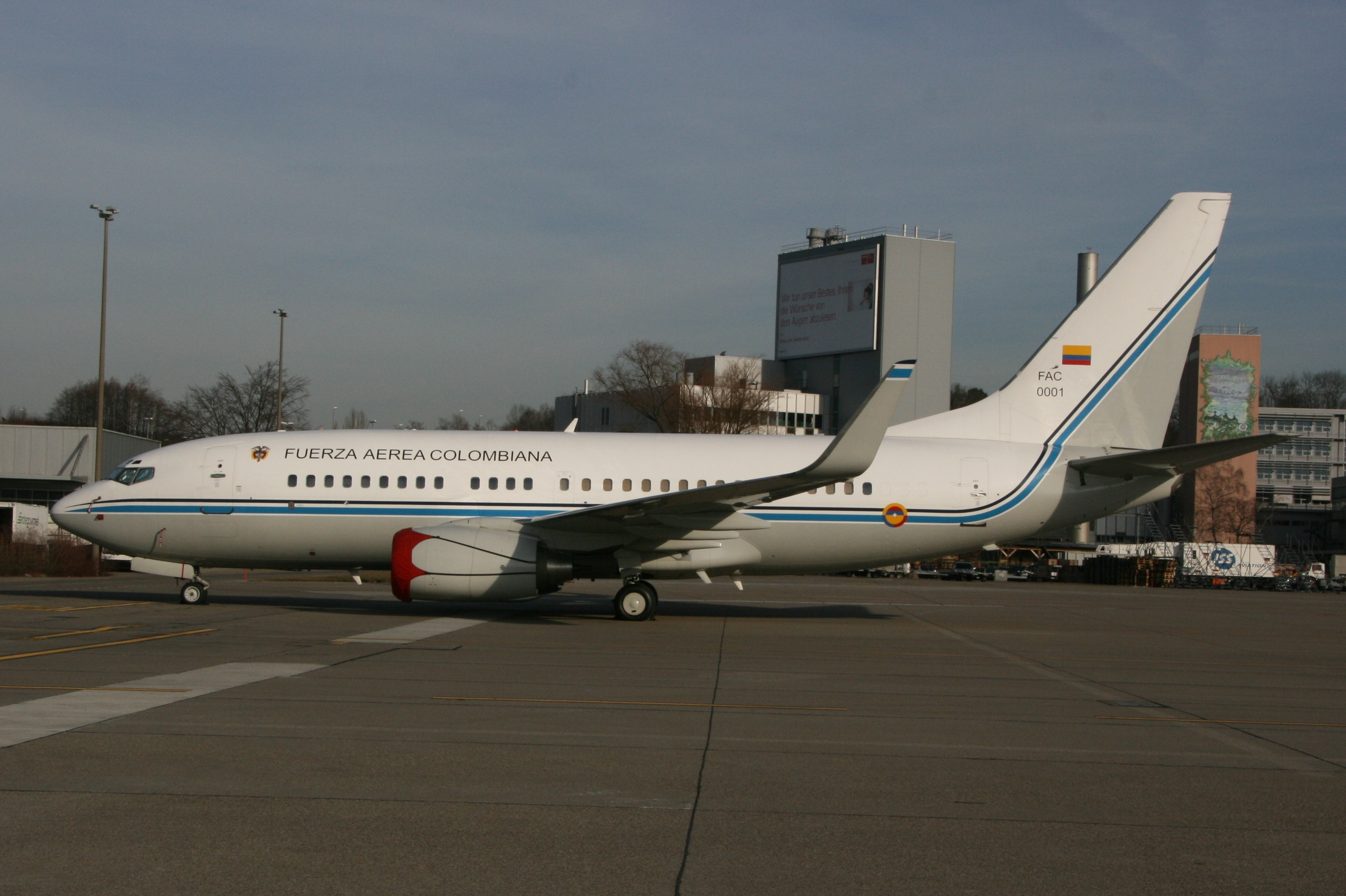
FAC 0001, the Boeing 737-700 often used as Air Force One (photo taken in 2008)

Colombian Air Force One is the official call sign for a Colombian Aerospace Force aircraft carrying the president of Colombia. The term is commonly used to refer to Colombian Aerospace Force aircraft modified and used to transport the president, and as a metonym for the main presidential aircraft.

== History ==
=== Early presidential aircraft ===
On August 10, 1922, Pedro Nel Ospina became the first Colombian president to have an official agenda abroad. Later, in 1933, Enrique Olaya Herrera acquired the Junkers Ju 52/3mce, then known as FAC 625. This German-made aircraft had a capacity for 20 crew members and served as the primary aircraft until 1950. Meanwhile, the Douglas C-47 Skytrain FAC 660, previously a secondary aircraft, was used as the primary aircraft by Gustavo Rojas Pinilla in 1953 on a provisional basis. A year later, in 1954, the C-54 Skymaster, registered as FAC 613, was acquired as the primary aircraft, relegating the C-47 Skytrain to secondary status. In 1957, the C-54 Skymaster was re-serialled FAC 690 and served as the primary aircraft until 1972. It continued in service with the FAC until 1990.

=== Fokker F-28 ===
The third presidential aircraft entered service on February 19, 1971, during the administration of Misael Pastrana. The Fokker F-28, manufactured in the Netherlands, became the primary service aircraft under the aeronautical code FAC 0001. In November 1971, it was assigned to repatriate the remains of President Guillermo León Valencia, who had died on November 4 in New York City. Later, in 1983, it became the secondary aircraft, and in 1986 it was assigned to Pope John Paul II during his visit to Colombia. In 2005 it was re-serialled FAC 0002, allowing the newly acquired Boeing BBJ to adopt the prestigious '0001' title.

=== Boeing 707 ===
In December 1983, a Boeing 707 with registration FAC 1201 was added to the fleet, augmenting the Fokker F-28. Given the name Zeus, it represented an advance in long-haul flights, mainly due to its flight range. It is now preserved in the Colombian Aerospace Museum.

=== Boeing Business Jet ===
Following the evident wear and tear on the Boeing 707, in 2002 the Colombian Air Force received several proposals from Canada, the United States, France, and Brazil. By 2004, the Air Force had two eligible options to replace its main aircraft: the Boeing 737 and the Airbus A319, both commercial versions of the Boeing Business Jet. Ultimately, the Boeing Business Jet was selected as the new Colombian Air Force One, and the purchase was made directly. Originally manufactured in 1999, it had 22 flight hours at the time of purchase.
