= Konrad Adenauer (aircraft) =

German official aircraft

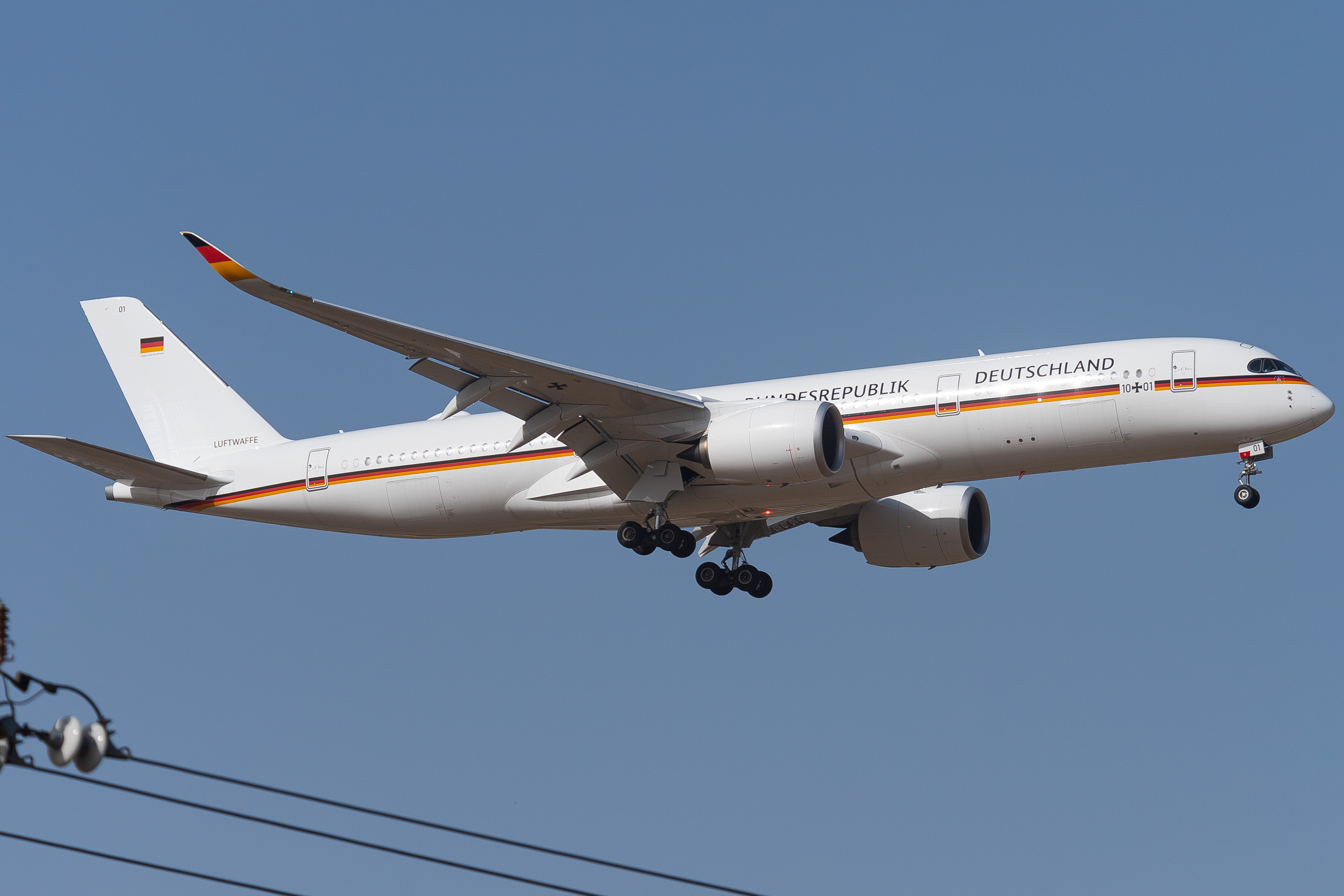
The current Konrad Adenauer (10+01) in April 2023

The Konrad Adenauer is a German aircraft used by the government for official travel and diplomatic business. It is named after German statesman Konrad Adenauer. Like all German governmental aircraft, the Konrad Adenauer is operated by the Executive Transport Wing of the German Air Force at Cologne Bonn Airport and Berlin Brandenburg Airport. Three different aircraft have carried the name, an Airbus A310, an Airbus A340 and an Airbus A350.

== A310 Konrad Adenauer (1990–2011) ==
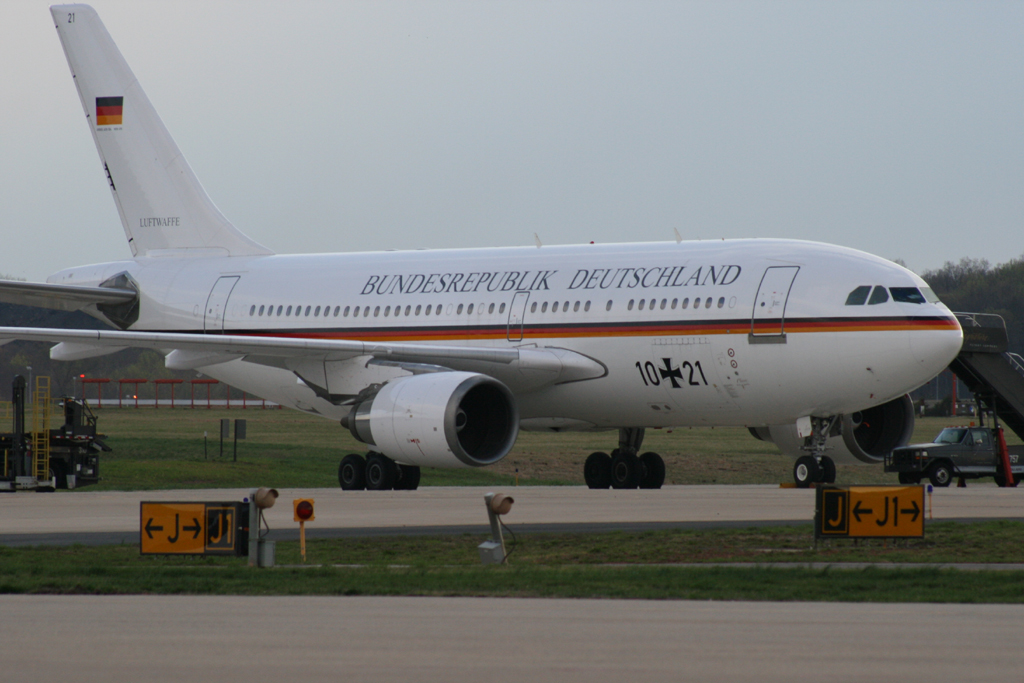
The former Konrad Adenauer (10+21) in April 2007

The first Konrad Adenauer (registration number 10+21) was an Airbus A310-304 (msn 498), just like the other similar-purposed German aircraft Kurt Schumacher, Hermann Köhl and Theodor Heuss. These aircraft were initially built for East German flag carrier Interflug in 1989, but were transferred to the German Air Force after reunification. The Konrad Adenauer had a white livery with the national colours of Germany (black-red-gold) around it and the words BUNDESREPUBLIK DEUTSCHLAND (Federal Republic of Germany).

In February 2011, the Konrad Adenauer was used to safely evacuate citizens of 15 nations from Libya. Soon after, in April 2011, the A310-304 Konrad Adenauer was replaced by an Airbus A340-313 VIP purchased secondhand from Lufthansa, also named Konrad Adenauer. The A310-304 was eventually sold to French operator Novespace, subsidiary of French Space Study National Center (CNES) which currently operates the airframe as a zero-g aircraft to perform scientific research, astronaut training and public passenger flights under the Air Zero G brand.

== A340 Konrad Adenauer (2011–2022) ==
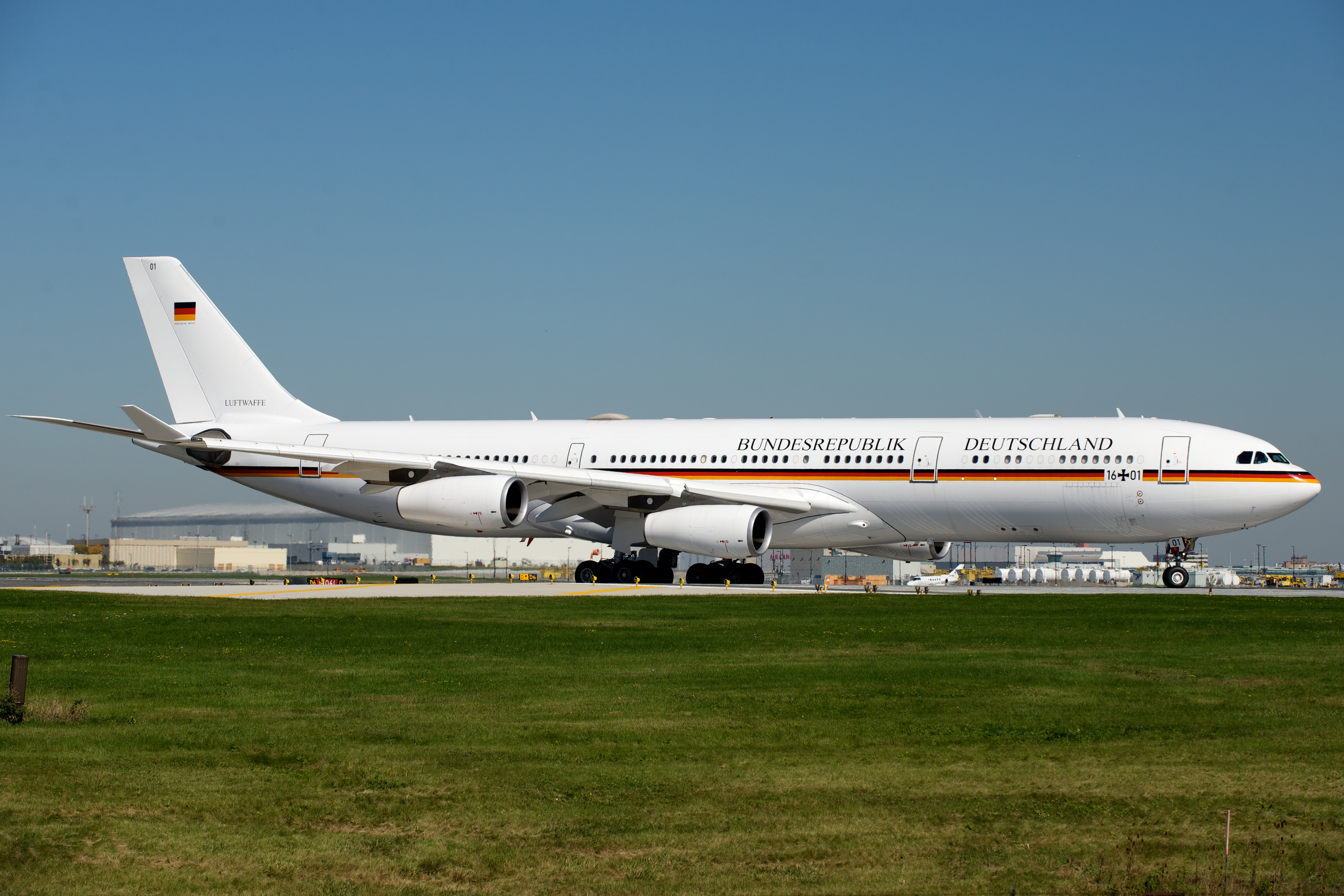
The former Konrad Adenauer (16+01) in September 2014

The second Konrad Adenauer (registration number 16+01) is a former Lufthansa Airbus A340-313 (msn 274) re-configured into a VIP configuration with sleeping rooms and a wide variety of safety technology. This former Konrad Adenauer is capable of flying 13,500 km (8,400 mi) non-stop, with the capability of transporting 143 passengers.

In November 2022, the A340-313 Konrad Adenauer was replaced by an Airbus A350-900 handed over from Lufthansa Technik, also named Konrad Adenauer.

The aircraft was taken out of service in August 2023 after technical problems and started to be auctioned off in January 2024.

== A350 Konrad Adenauer (2022–present) ==
The current Konrad Adenauer (registration number 10+01) is a former Lufthansa Technik Airbus A350-900 re-configured into a VIP configuration with political-parliamentary operations, and has separate spaces to allow for private meetings, roundtables and other activities. The rest of the space in the aircraft has been given over to the delegations that typically travel with the VIPs. These areas have large seating arrangements, bathrooms and modern galley equipment. As well as the visible alterations, the jet is also fitted with cutting edge communications and radar technology. All three government A350s will be outfitted with Directional Infrared Counter Measures starting in 2026.

== See also ==
- Air transports of heads of state and government
- Boeing VC-25, the analogous plane used by the President of the United States.
