= Presidential helicopter =

Presidential helicopter may refer to:

- Agrupación Aérea Presidencial helicopter, used to transport the President of Argentina
- Avion Presidente Juarez, the Mexican presidential helicopter
- Brazilian Presidential Helicopter, used to transport the President of Brazil
- Marine One, the call sign of a U.S. Marine Corps aircraft when carrying the President of the United States
- Presidential helicopter (South Korea), the Republic of Korea Air Force Helicopter used to transport the President of South Korea
