= VC2 =

VC2 may refer to:

- Valkyria Chronicles II, a 2010 tactical role-playing game by Sega for the PlayStation Portable, sequel to Valkyria Chronicles
- Second Vatican Council or Vatican II, 1962–1965, addressed relations between the Roman Catholic Church and the modern world
- Virtua Cop 2, a light gun arcade game by Sega released in 1995
- VideoCipher 2, a television receive-only (TVRO) scrambling system publicly launched 1986, phased out 1991 to 2014
- VC-2, secondary aircraft for carrying the President of Brazil within South America, see Brazilian Air Force One#Secondary aircraft (VC-2)
- VC-2, a video compression format, see Dirac-Pro video codec
- VC2, a candidate phylum of bacteria
