= Brazilian Air Force One =

Brazilian Air Force aircraft carrying the President

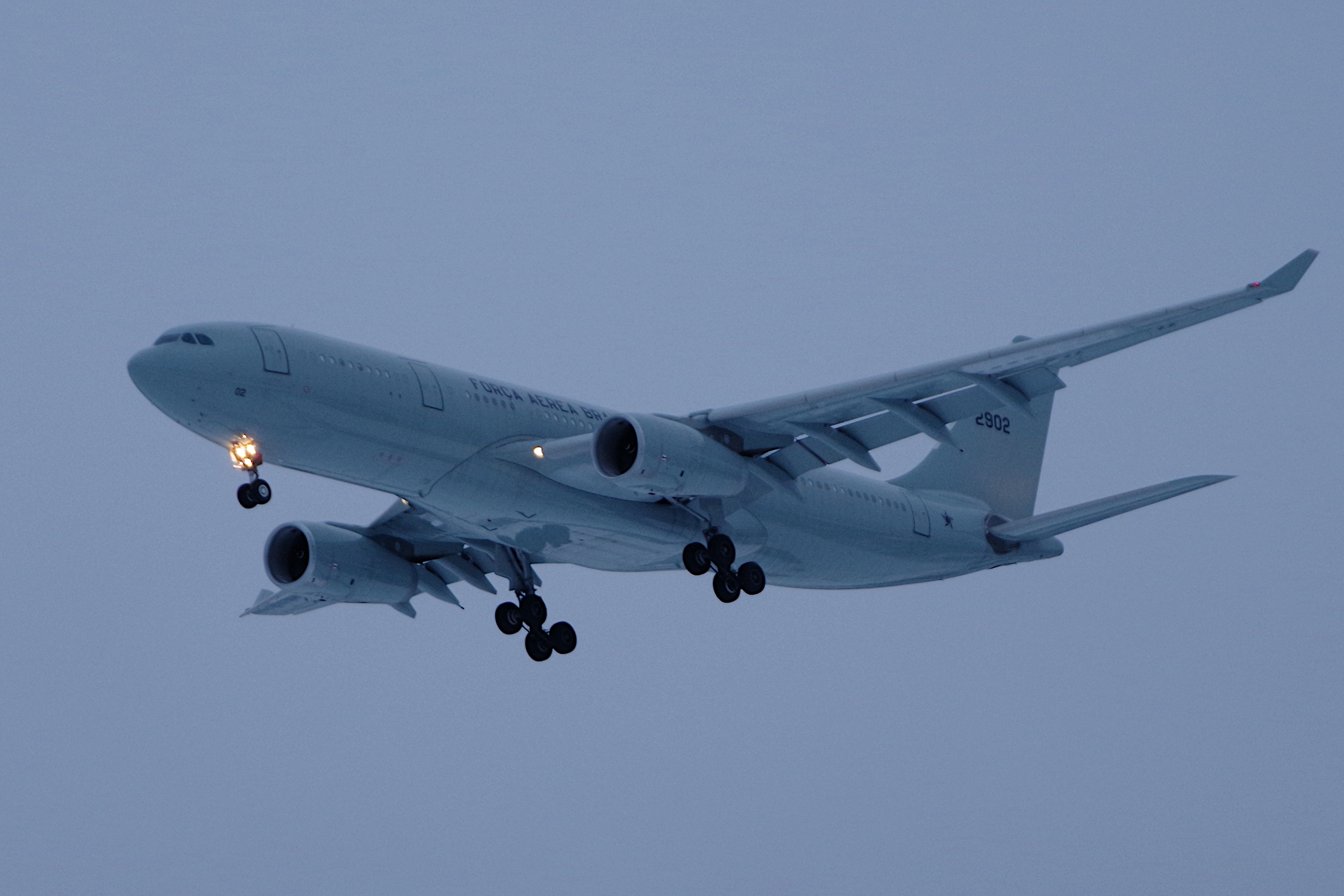
- A Brazilian Air Force Airbus A330-200 (designated KC-30, serial 2902) on landing approach.

General information
- Type: Presidential transport
- National origin: Europe
- Manufacturer: Airbus
- Status: In service
- Primary user: Brazilian Air Force
- Number built: 2

History
- Introduction date: February 2023
- Developed from: Airbus A330-200

Brazilian Air Force One is the Brazilian Air Force call sign of the aircraft carrying the President of Brazil. On international flights the aircraft uses the Brazilian Air Force ICAO code BRS1 and callsign Brazilian Air Force 01. The Special Transport Group (GTE) is the unit of the Brazilian Air Force responsible for transporting the President, Vice-President and other senior government officials.

== Main aircraft ==
The main presidential aircraft currently used to transport the President of Brazil provisionally are two military version Airbus A330-200s with callsign (FAB-2901 and FAB-2902) designated by the Brazilian Air Force as KC-30.

The presidency also uses two modified Embraer 190 jets, Air Force designation VC-2, christened as "Bartolomeu de Gusmão" and "Augusto Severo", for presidential travel within Brazil and South America. The Brazilian Air Force purchased the aircraft on 2 June 2008 to replace the two Boeing 737-2N3 (VC-96) that were previously used for short-range presidential transport. The aircraft is configured with special communications systems, a private presidential office and a meeting room. It has the capacity for carrying 40 passengers with a range of over 2,500 miles.

=== Other aircraft ===
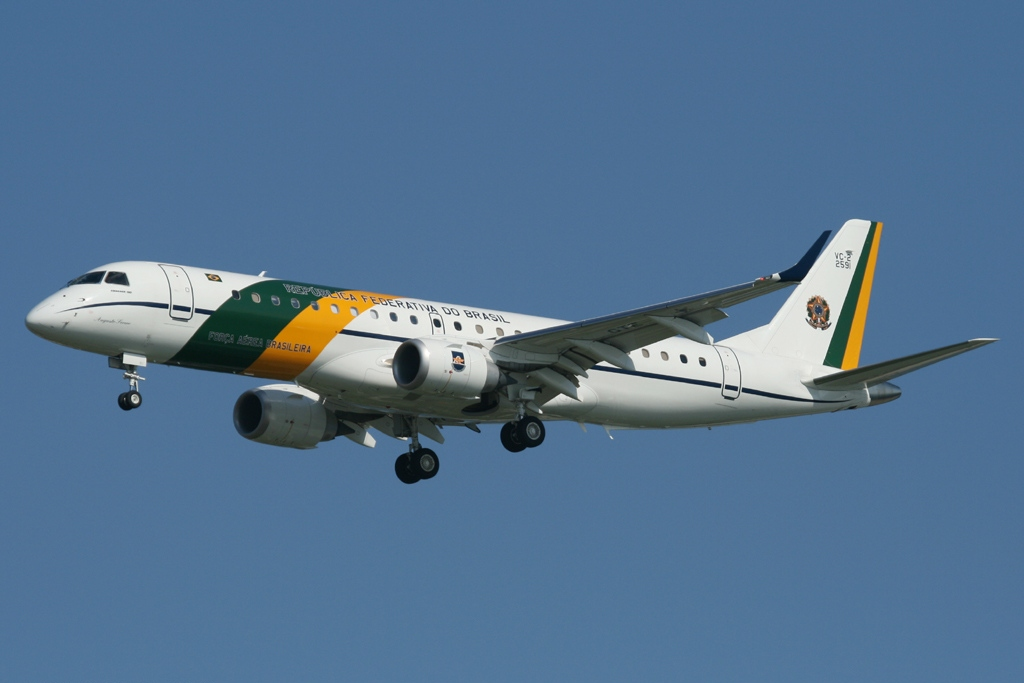
The VC-2 airplane used for short-range travel

Along with the VC-1A and the VC-2s, 21 other aircraft are part of the fleet:

- Two VIP-configured Eurocopter EC725 (VH-36) presidential helicopter.
- Two VIP-configured Eurocopter Super Puma (VH-34) presidential helicopters.
- Two VIP-configured Embraer ERJ-145 (VC-99C) aircraft.
- Ten Embraer ERJ-145 (C-99A) jets.
- Three Gates Learjet 35 (VU-35) jets.
- Two Eurocopter EC135 (VH-35) helicopters

The VIP fleet is stationed at Brasília Air Force Base (BABR) and operated by the Special Transportation Group (GTE).

== Former aircraft ==
Former aircraft used for transportation of the President of Brazil:

Quantity	Aircraft	Photo	Notes
One	Lockheed Lodestar; VC-66	Lockheed VC-66 in 1942. Brazilian National Archives	1942–1962; Purchased by President Getúlio Vargas. First presidential aircraft.
Two	Vickers Viscount; VC-90	Vickers VC-90 displayed at Museu Aeroespacial	1956–1967; Purchased by President Juscelino Kubitschek to replace the VC-66. It was nicknamed "Cafona" (Corny).
Two	BAC One-Eleven; VC-92		1968–1976; Purchased by President Costa e Silva. First jet aircraft used for the transportation of the President in Brazil.
Two	Boeing 737; VC-96	Boeing VC-96	1976–2010; Purchased during the administration of President Ernesto Geisel as replacement for the VC-92. It was nicknamed "Sucatinha" (Little Scrap).
One	Boeing 707; KC-137	Boeing KC-137	1986–2005; Purchased by President José Sarney and served the Presidency until its replacement in 2005 by the Airbus A319 ACJ. It was nicknamed "Sucatão" (Big Scrap).
One	Airbus A319 ACJ; VC-1A	Airbus A319 ACJ	2005–2024; Purchased by President Luiz Inácio Lula da Silva and served the Presidency until its retirement in 2024. It was nicknamed "Aerolula".

== A319 replacement ==
Since October 2024, the federal government through Ministry of Defence, is in process to select a replacement to the Airbus A319ACJ that was in operation since 2005. The models discussed are ACJ versions of the Airbus A350, A330neo and A320neo families. The requirements include long-range capability, high-speed internet and communications for direct and uninterrupted contact with the capital Brasília, aerial refueling capability, similar to the American Air Force One presidential jet, among other specific requests to meet national security standards.

== See also ==
- Air transports of heads of state and government
- Brazilian Presidential Helicopter
