= Presidential state car (South Korea) =

Official state car of South Korea

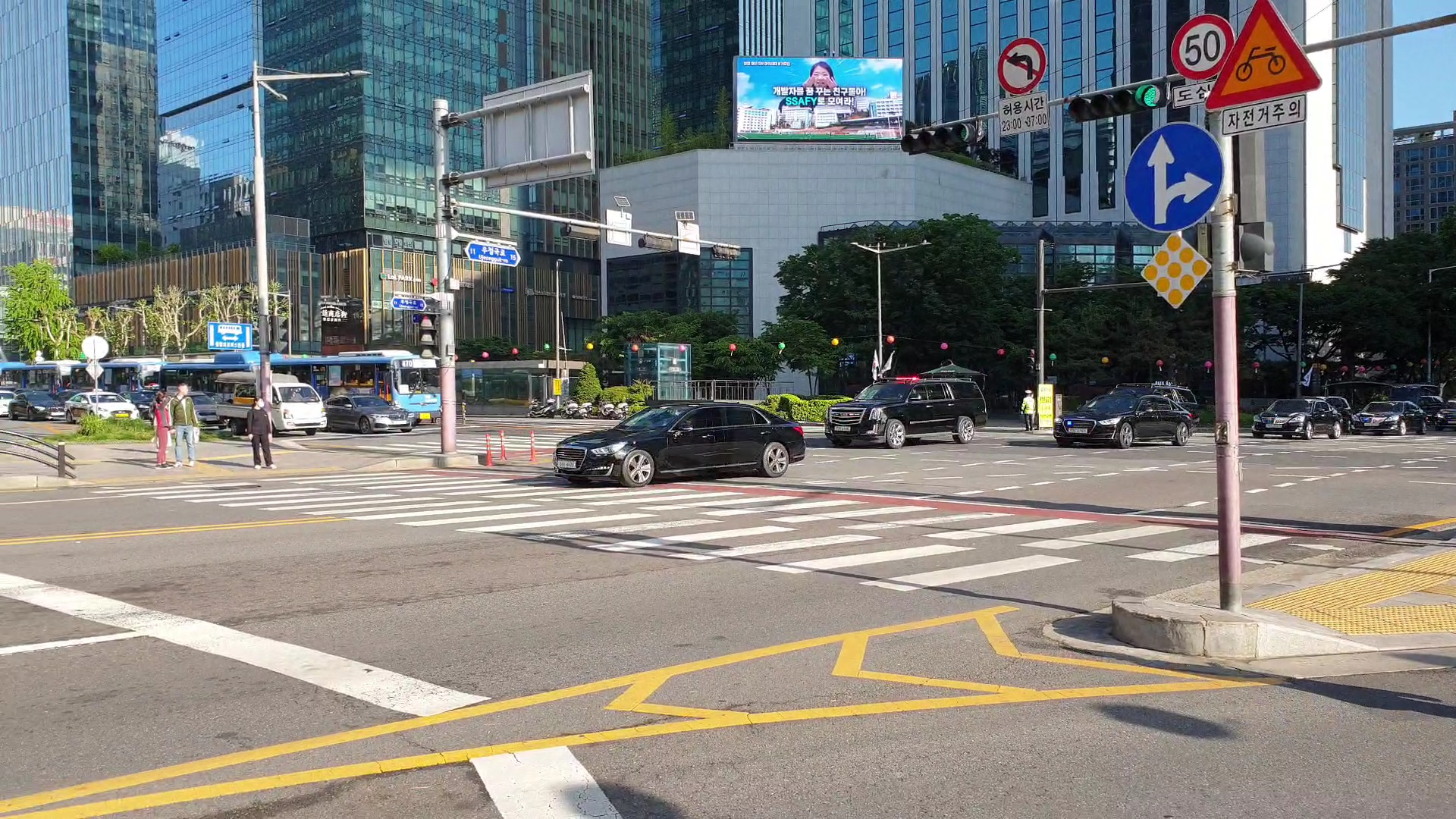
The Presidential State car Genesis EQ900L in the presidential motorcade carrying President Yoon.

The current President of South Korea, Lee Jae Myung, uses a highly modified Genesis EQ900L, and a Mercedes-Maybach W222 S600 Guard as his official state cars.

Seven Hyundai Nexo SUV's were purchased in 2018 to replace the three Genesis EQ900 limousines that were provided in 2017 to former President Moon. These were the first presidential vehicles manufactured in South Korea, offered bulletproofing to a B7/UL8 level, and are equipped with oxygen supply, fire suppression systems, infrared night vision, run flat tyres, and a computer and communications facility. The Genesis limousines were used after the inauguration of Moon.

The state Hyundai Equus vehicle was built and developed in South Korea and was part of a highly classified project. At the time of its production, it was the first and only armored stretched limousine built entirely in South Korea.

== Previous generations ==
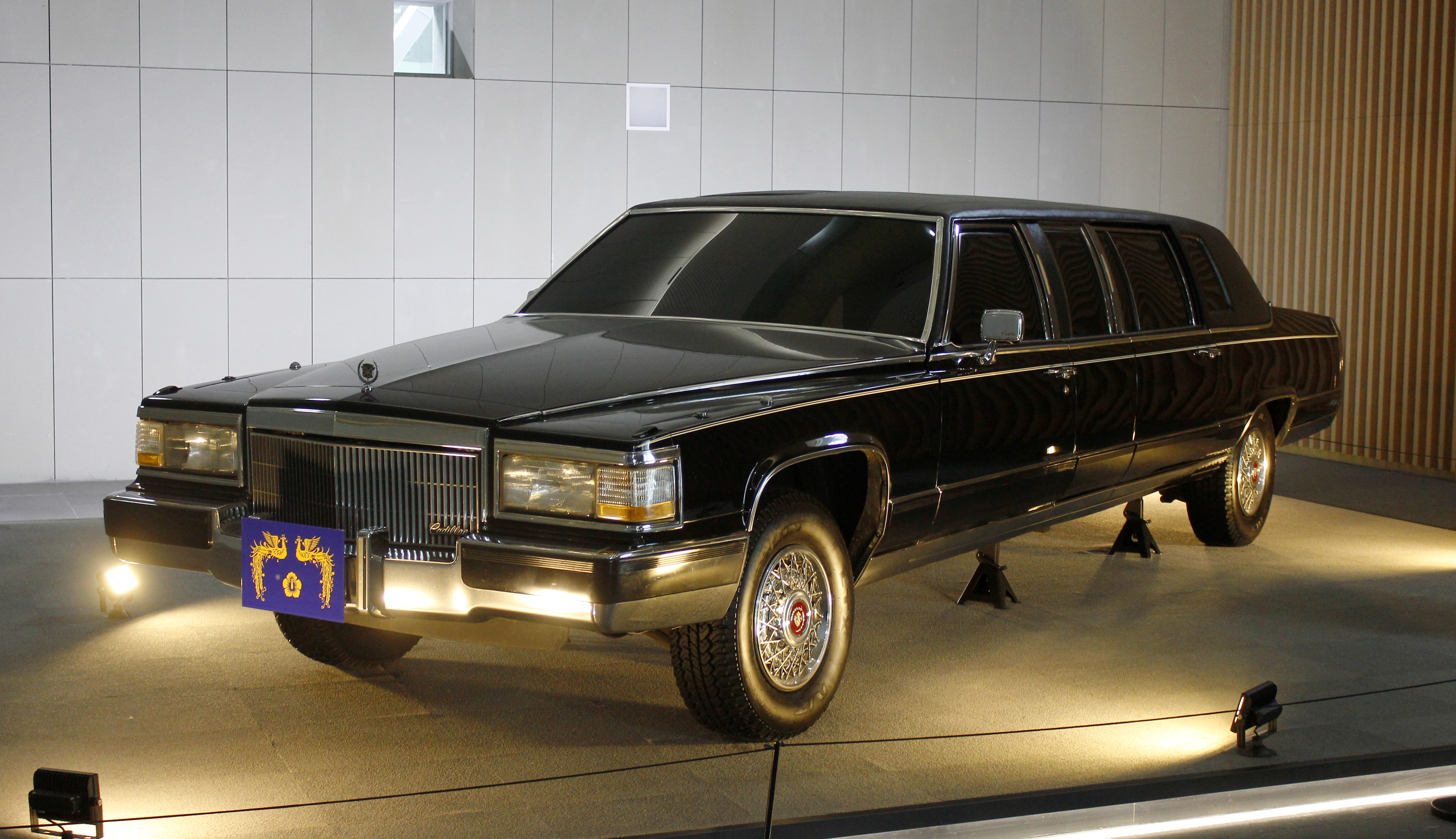
The 1992 Cadillac that served as the former presidential state car of South Korea with the presidential seal on the license plate

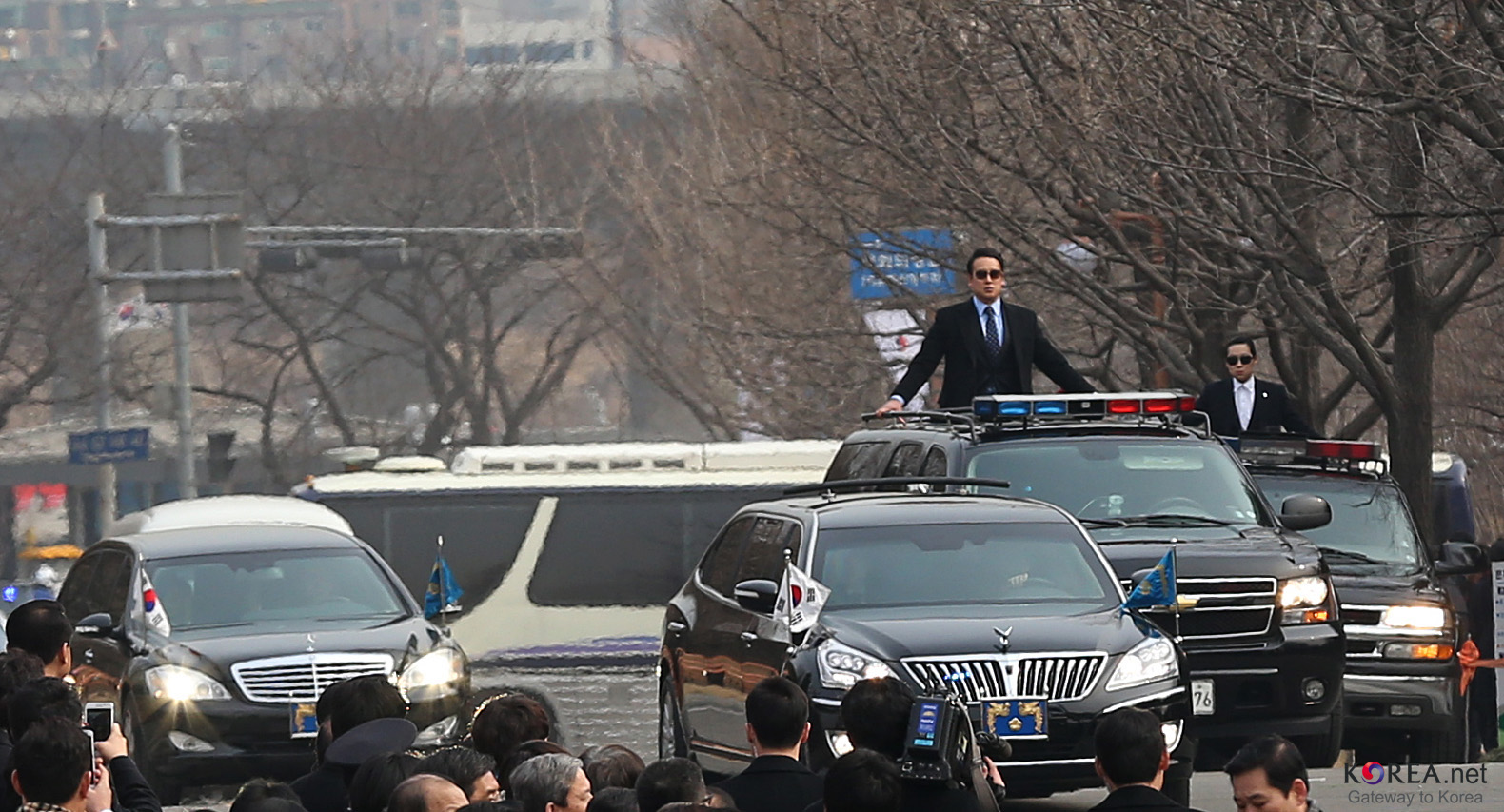
Mercedes-Benz W222 S600 Pullman Guard and Hyundai Equus Stretch Edition at the 2013 inauguration of Park Geun-hye

President Roh Moo-hyun rode in an armoured BMW E65 Security 760Li purchased in 2005 and a 2002-model Mercedes-Benz W220 S600 Guard. Roh used the W220 during peace talks with North Korea. The presidential motorcade was escorted by Chevrolet Tahoe, Chevrolet Suburban, and Ford Excursion, also with several identical Mercedes-Benz W220s.

It is believed that Blue House prefers to use the Mercedes vehicles instead of the Genesis in talks with North Korea to present a neutral brand that is also favored by North Korea.

The late president Kim Dae-jung used an armored BMW E38 Security 760Li, offered by BMW Korea, for his state visit to Mongolia in June 1999, while presidents Rhee, Yun, Park, and Chun used successive models of Cadillac Fleetwood limousines. Roh Tae-woo switched to the FN9 Lincoln Continental, while Kim Dae-jung was the first to switch to German vehicles. Park Geun-hye was the first to officially use a Korean produced vehicle.

- Syngman Rhee: Cadillac Series 62 sedan, Packard Patrician
- Yun Posun: Cadillac Series 62 sedan
- Park Chung Hee: Cadillac Series 75 limousine and sedan, Sixty Special Brougham, Mercedes-Benz 600, and Chevrolet Biscayne
- Choi Kyu-hah: KIA Peugeot 604, Mercedes-Benz 380SEL
- Chun Doo-hwan: Cadillac Fleetwood Brougham Limousine
- Roh Tae-woo: Cadillac Fleetwood Brougham Limousine
- Kim Young-sam: Cadillac Fleetwood Brougham Limousine
- Kim Dae-jung: Mercedes-Benz W220 S600 Guard, Mercedes-Benz V140 S600 Guard, and Hyundai Equus Limousine
- Roh Moo-hyun: BMW E67 Security 760Li, Mercedes-Benz W220 S600 Guard
- Lee Myung-bak: BMW E67 Security 760Li, Mercedes-Benz W221 S600 Pullman Guard, and Hyundai Equus Stretch Edition
- Park Geun-hye: Hyundai Equus VL500 limousine
- Moon Jae-in: Mercedes-Maybach W222 S600 Guard, Genesis EQ900, and Hyundai Nexo SUV
- Yoon Suk Yeol: Mercedes-Maybach W222 S600 Guard, Genesis EQ900, and Hyundai Nexo SUV

== Security ==
The current state cars of South Korea are highly modified and have a lot of classified technology built into them, of what is publicly known, they have the following installed on it: Secure telephone communications, infrared vision cameras, secure satellite communications, fire extinguishing system that is at the bottom of the cars to put out any fires caused by an explosive, sirens, and a fresh oxygen system that will pump oxygen into the interior of the cars to protect from any gases. The cars are also armoured with bulletproof windows, run-flat tires, and the metal has been replaced with B7/UL8 rated bulletproof metal, the bottom of the cars have a thick sheet of metal to protect from any explosives, and the interior has been completely renovated for luxury but has also been reinforced with steel and Kevlar to achieve B7/UL8 rating. The cars also cannot be opened from the inside so a highly trained armed Presidential Security Service agent opens the door for the president. They also sit in the passenger side to not only do their duty but if somehow the motorcade is attacked, their job is to fire at the belligerent and neutralize them immediately. The gas tank is also non-explosive as there is a special foam that prevents the gas tank from exploding. There are always spare tires and parts in the motorcade in case of immediate repairs or tire changes. There are also identical cars that travel in the presidential motorcade that act as decoys but also as spares. Ambulances that travel in the motorcade always carry the president's blood type. The car, when not being used, is stored at the foreign affairs ministry along with the other cars of the Presidential motorcade in a secret warehouse. The presidential motorcade usually consists of 20 to 30 cars and the car is driven by a highly trained Presidential Security Service agent that is trained to handle all matters of environment and driving. The main vehicle along with the decoys, cost over $1 million each.

== Operation ==
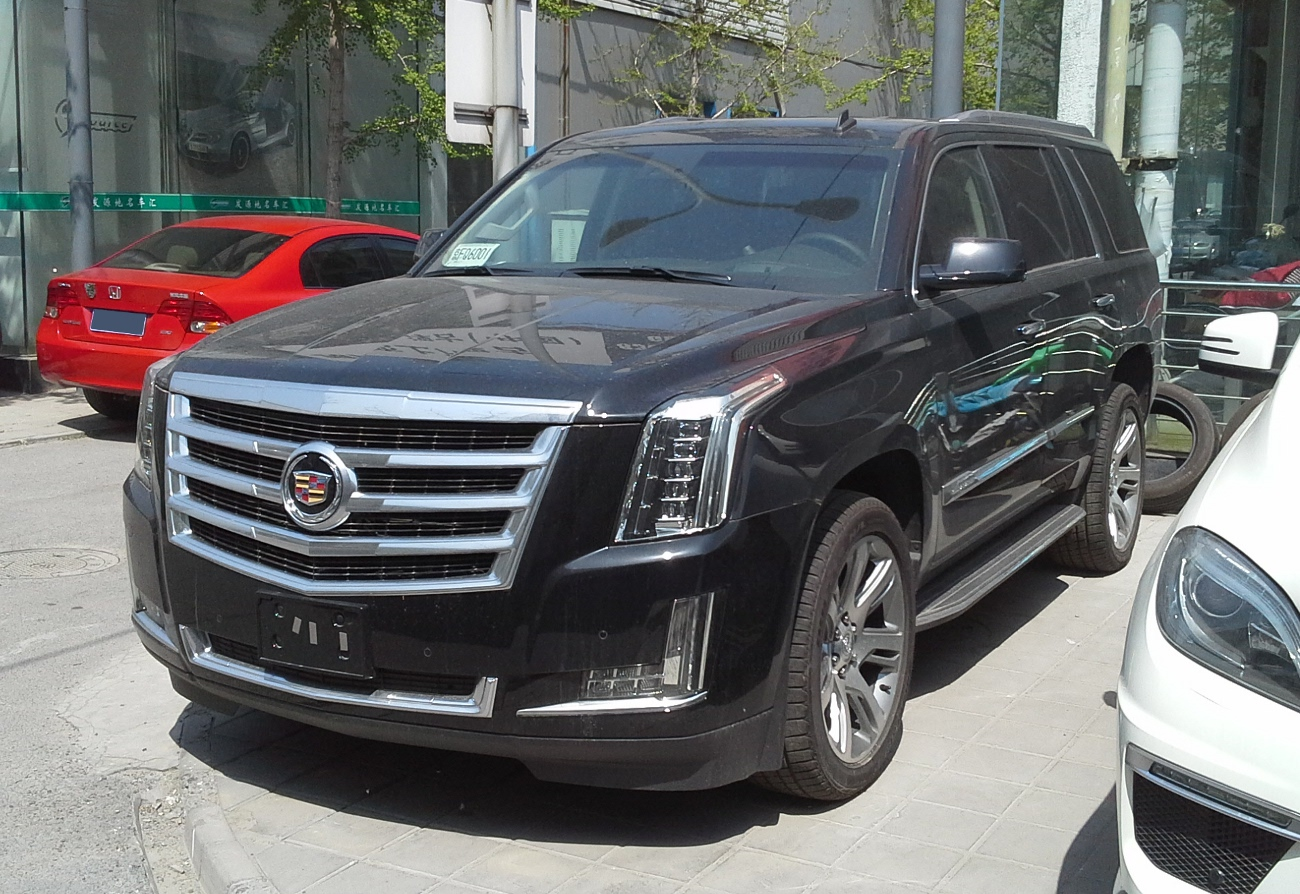
The Cadillac Escalade that serves in the presidential motorcade and usually has PSS agents standing up through the sunroof watching for any belligerents.

Recent South Korean presidential state cars have been bulletproof, with bulletproof windows and bulletproof tires. All other details remain classified.

On most state visits, the president has another highly modified car which is usually a Mercedes Maybach airlifted by a Republic of Korea Air Force cargo plane to the destination, along with several other armored vehicles from South Korea that will be used in the presidential motorcade.

The Presidential motorcade has a vast array of vehicles and the motorcade consists of 20 cars or more, with the streets shutdown while the president is traveling the cars that are in the motorcade are as follows. Korean National Police officers on motorcycles, police cars, ambulances, Cadillac Escalade’s, Mercedes vans, Genesis vehicles, Volkswagen vehicles, Hyundai vehicles, and Hyundai Nexo SUVs.

National transport services for the South Korean President are provided by the Korean National Police Agency and the Presidential Security Service.

The Ministry of Foreign Affairs keeps an armoured Cadillac DTS limousine by Alpine Armoring and an armoured Hyundai Equus limousine for foreign dignitaries. Each vehicle was acquired between 2010 and 2011.

== See also ==
- Code One
- List of official vehicles of the president of South Korea
- Official state car
- President of South Korea
- Presidential Helicopter of South Korea
- Transportation of the President of South Korea
