= Transportation of the president of South Korea =

Transportation methods used for the President of South Korea

The transportation of the president of South Korea includes a variety of vehicles for the president maintained by the South Korean government. Because of their role as commander-in-chief they exclusively use military transports for international travel. However, the civilian Presidential Security Service operates the president's motorcade.

== Aircraft ==
Since 2010, whenever the president is on board a military flight its call sign is Code One. Also, a highly modified Boeing 747-8 has served as the current Code One. Its lease comes to an end in 2020 where the presidential bidding process will begin.

Since 2007, three highly modified Sikorsky S-92 have served as the presidential helicopters. These are used to take the president and his family from the Blue House to Seoul Air Base, where Code One is stationed, and where it takes off from; and it takes the president around the country for various official engagements.

== Automobiles ==
The presidential state car is a highly modified 2018 Hyundai Nexo SUV first introduced in 2019 of which it is operated by the civilian Presidential Security Service. There are at least seven SUVs at the president's service.

== See also ==
- Air transports of heads of state and government
- Code One
- List of official vehicles of the president of South Korea
- Official state car
- President of South Korea
- Presidential state car (South Korea)
- Presidential Helicopter (South Korea)
