= President of South Korea =

Head of state and government

President of the Republic of Korea
- Presidential emblem

- Presidential standard

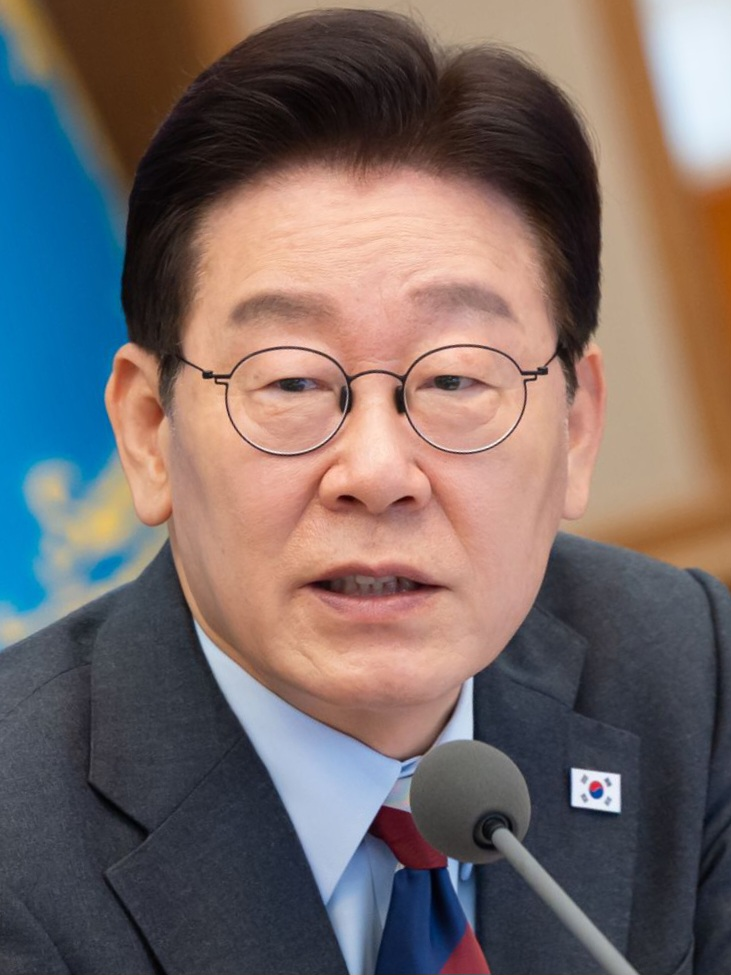
- Incumbent; Lee Jae Myung since 4 June 2025
- Executive branch of the Government of South Korea; Office of the President
- Style: Mr. President (informal); His Excellency (diplomatic)
- Status: Head of state; Head of government; Commander-in-chief
- Member of: State Council; National Security Council; National Unification Advisory Council
- Residence: Cheong Wa Dae
- Seat: Seoul
- Appointer: Direct popular vote
- Term length: Five years, Non renewable
- Constituting instrument: Constitution of South Korea (1948)
- Precursor: President of the Provisional Government of the Republic of Korea
- Formation: 24 July 1948; 78 years ago
- First holder: Syngman Rhee
- Unofficial names: President of South Korea
- Deputy: Prime Minister of South Korea
- Salary: ₩240,648,000/US$165,084 annually (2024)
- Website: Official website (in Korean)

Korean name
- Hangul: 대한민국 대통령
- Hanja: 大韓民國大統領
- RR: Daehanminguk daetongnyeong
- MR: Taehanmin'guk taet'ongnyŏng

The president of the Republic of Korea (Korean: 대한민국 대통령), also known as the president of South Korea (한국 대통령), is the head of state and head of government of South Korea. The president directs the executive branch of the government and is the commander-in-chief of the Republic of Korea Armed Forces.

The Constitution of South Korea and the amended Presidential Election Act of 1987 provide for election of the president by direct, secret ballot, ending sixteen years of indirect presidential elections under the preceding two authoritarian governments. The president is directly elected to a five-year term, with no possibility of re-election. If a presidential vacancy should occur, a successor must be elected within sixty days, during which time presidential duties are to be performed by the prime minister or other senior cabinet members in the order of priority as determined by law.

The president is exempt from criminal liability (except for insurrection or treason) during their term. The President of South Korea wields significant power with limited checks and balances, a system often dubbed as an "imperial presidency," which renders it prone to abuse of power and corruption. However, the single-term presidency frequently results in a lame-duck government, where, as the president's influence wanes, investigative and prosecutorial agencies can more readily gather evidence to initiate charges against the president. This dynamic contributes to the emergence of the so-called "Blue House" Curse.

On 3 June 2025, Lee Jae Myung of the Democratic Party was elected as president of South Korea. Due to the previous president's impeachment and expulsion from office, Lee was sworn in immediately the next day.

== History ==
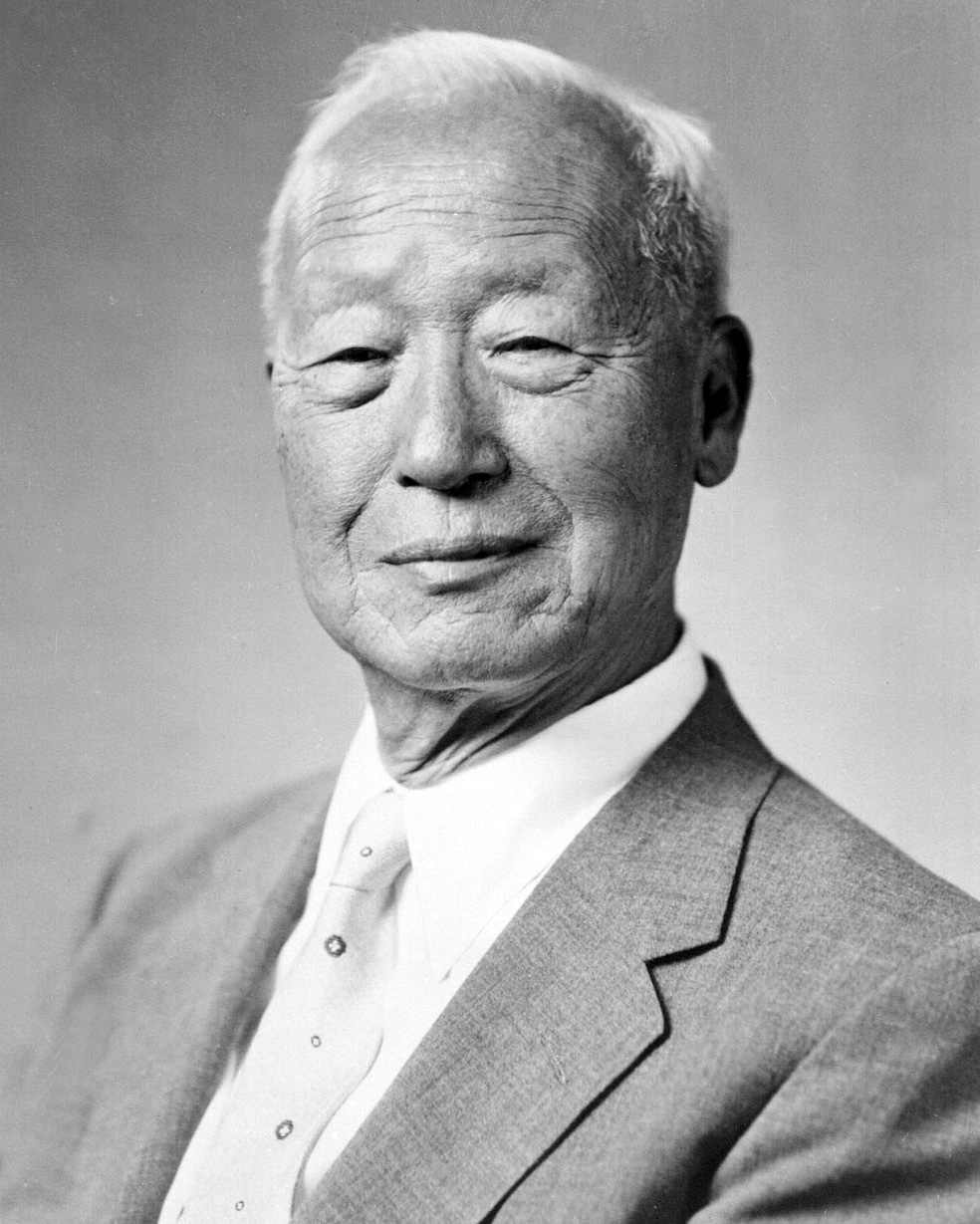
Syng-man Rhee, the first President of South Korea

Prior to the establishment of the First Republic in 1948, the Provisional Government of the Republic of Korea established in Shanghai in September 1919 as the continuation of several governments proclaimed in the aftermath of March First Movement earlier that year coordinated resistance against Japanese rule. The legitimacy of the Provisional Government has been recognized and succeeded by South Korea in the latter's original Constitution of 1948 and the current Constitution of 1987.

The presidential term has been set at five years since 1988. It was previously set at four years from 1948 to 1972, six years from 1972 to 1981, and seven years from 1981 to 1988. Since 1981, the president has been barred from re-election.

== Powers and duties of the president ==
Chapter 3 of the South Korean constitution states the duties and the powers of the president. The president is required to:

- uphold the Constitution
- preserve the safety and homeland of South Korea
- work for the peaceful reunification of Korea, typically act as the Chairperson of the Peaceful Unification Advisory Council

Also, the president is given the powers:

- as the head of the executive branch of government
- as the commander-in-chief of the South Korean military
- to declare war
- to hold referendums regarding issues of national importance
- to issue executive orders
- to issue medals in honor of service for the nation
- to issue pardons
- to declare a state of emergency suspending all laws or enacting a state of martial law
- to veto bills (subject to a two-thirds majority veto override by the National Assembly)

If the National Assembly votes against a presidential decision, it is declared void immediately and cannot be overridden.

The president may refer important policy matters to a national referendum, declare war, conclude peace and other treaties, appoint senior public officials, and grant amnesty (with the concurrence of the National Assembly). In times of serious internal or external turmoil or threat, or economic or financial crises, the president may assume emergency powers "for the maintenance of national security or public peace and order." Emergency measures may be taken only when the National Assembly is not in session and when there is no time for it to convene. The measures are limited to the "minimum necessary."

The 1987 Constitution removed the 1980 Constitution's explicit provisions that empowered the government to temporarily suspend the freedoms and rights of the people. However, the president is permitted to take other measures that could amend or abolish existing laws for the duration of a crisis. It is unclear whether such emergency measures could temporarily suspend portions of the Constitution itself. Emergency measures must be referred to the National Assembly for concurrence. If not endorsed by the assembly, the emergency measures can be revoked; any laws that had been overridden by presidential order regain their original effect. In this respect, the power of the legislature is more vigorously asserted than in cases of ratification of treaties or declarations of war, in which the Constitution simply states that the National Assembly "has the right to consent" to the president's actions. In a change from the 1980 Constitution, the 1987 Constitution stated that the president is not permitted to dissolve the National Assembly.

== Term limits ==
The office of president has a strict non-renewable term limit of five years, enacted in 1987 under Article 70 of the Constitution of South Korea after the country endured several years of autocratic rule. South Korea's presidential term limit is one of the shortest in the world and is the shortest in Asia. As an additional safeguard against authoritarian tendencies, Article 128 of the Constitution stipulates that any amendments to extend the term of office shall not apply to the incumbent president at the time the amendments were made.

== Election ==
The presidential election rules are defined by the South Korean Constitution and the Public Official Election Act. The president is elected by direct popular vote, conducted using first-past-the-post.

=== Latest election ===

Vote share by municipalities and provinces (inset)

Candidate	Party	Votes	%
Lee Jae Myung	Democratic Party	17,287,513	49.42
Kim Moon-soo	People Power Party	14,395,639	41.15
Lee Jun-seok	Reform Party	2,917,523	8.34
Kwon Yeong-guk	Democratic Labor Party	344,150	0.98
Song Jin-ho	Independent	35,791	0.10
Total		34,980,616	100.00
Valid votes		34,980,616	99.27
Invalid/blank votes		255,881	0.73
Total votes		35,236,497	100.00
Registered voters/turnout		44,391,871	79.38
Source: National Election Commission

=== By province and city ===
Province/City	Lee Jae Myung		Kim Moon-soo		Lee Jun-seok		Kwon Yeong-guk		Song Jin-ho	
Province/City	Votes	%	Votes	%	Votes	%	Votes	%	Votes	%
Seoul	3,105,459	47.13	2,738,405	41.56	655,346	9.95	83,900	1.27	5,998	0.09
Busan	895,213	40.14	1,146,238	51.40	168,473	7.55	18,189	0.82	2,099	0.09
Daegu	379,130	23.23	1,103,913	67.63	135,376	8.29	12,531	0.77	1,362	0.08
Incheon	1,044,295	51.68	776,952	38.45	176,739	8.75	20,743	1.03	2,098	0.10
Gwangju	844,682	84.77	79,937	8.02	62,104	6.23	8,767	0.88	934	0.09
Daejeon	470,321	48.51	393,549	40.59	94,724	9.77	9,905	1.02	1,109	0.11
Ulsan	315,820	42.54	353,180	47.57	63,177	8.51	9,299	1.25	899	0.12
Sejong	140,620	55.63	83,965	33.22	25,004	9.89	2,961	1.17	235	0.09
Gyeonggi	4,821,148	52.21	3,504,620	37.95	816,435	8.84	84,074	0.91	8,356	0.09
Gangwon	449,161	43.96	483,360	47.31	78,704	7.70	9,422	0.92	1,137	0.11
North Chungcheong	501,990	47.47	457,065	43.22	86,984	8.23	10,169	0.96	1,228	0.12
South Chungcheong	661,316	47.68	600,108	43.27	111,092	8.01	12,893	0.93	1,519	0.11
North Jeolla	1,023,272	82.65	134,996	10.90	67,961	5.49	10,061	0.81	1,719	0.14
South Jeolla	1,111,941	85.87	110,624	8.54	60,822	4.70	9,352	0.72	2,104	0.16
North Gyeongsang	442,683	25.53	1,159,594	66.87	116,094	6.69	13,884	0.80	1,788	0.10
South Gyeongsang	851,733	39.40	1,123,843	51.99	161,579	7.47	21,809	1.01	2,678	0.12
Jeju	228,729	54.77	145,290	34.79	36,909	8.84	6,191	1.48	528	0.13
Total	17,287,513	49.42	14,395,639	41.15	2,917,523	8.34	344,150	0.98	35,791	0.10
Source: National Election Commission

== Related constitutional organs ==
The president is assisted by the staff of the Presidential Secretariat, headed by a cabinet-rank secretary general. Apart from the State Council, or cabinet, the chief executive relies on several constitutional organs.

These constitutional organs included the National Security Council, which provided advice concerning the foreign, military, and domestic policies bearing on national security. Chaired by the president, the council in 1990 had as its statutory members the prime minister, the deputy prime minister, the ministers for foreign affairs, home affairs, finance, and national defense; the director of the Agency for National Security Planning (ANSP), which was known as the Korean Central Intelligence Agency (KCIA) until December 1980, and others designated by the president. Another important body is the Peaceful Unification Advisory Council, inaugurated in June 1981 under the chairmanship of the president. From its inception, this body had no policy role but rather appeared to serve as a government sounding board and as a means to disburse political rewards by providing large numbers of dignitaries and others with titles and opportunities to meet periodically with the president and other senior officials.

The president also was assisted in 1990 by the Audit and Inspection Board. In addition to auditing the accounts of all public institutions, the board scrutinized the administrative performance of government agencies and public officials. Its findings were reported to the president and the National Assembly, which itself had broad powers to inspect the work of the bureaucracy under the provisions of the Constitution. Board members were appointed by the president.

One controversial constitutional organ was the Advisory Council of Elder Statesmen, which replaced a smaller body in February 1988, just before Roh Tae Woo was sworn in as president. This body was supposed to be chaired by the immediate former president; its expansion to eighty members, broadened functions, and elevation to cabinet rank made it appear to have been designed, as one Seoul newspaper said, to "preserve the status and position of a certain individual." The government announced plans to reduce the size and functions of this body immediately after Roh's inauguration. Public suspicions that the council might provide former President Chun with a power base within the Sixth Republic were rendered moot when Chun withdrew to an isolated Buddhist temple in self-imposed exile in November 1988.

== Removal ==
English Translation: Impeachment of the President (Park Geun-hye), Case No. 2016Hun-Na1

The procedure for impeachment is set out in the Constitution. According to Article 65, Clause 1, if the President, Prime Minister, or other state council members violate the Constitution or other laws of official duty, the National Assembly can impeach them.

Clause 2 states the impeachment bill must be proposed by one third and approved by a majority of members of the National Assembly for passage. In the case of the President, the motion must be proposed by a majority and approved by a supermajority of two- thirds or more of the total members of the National Assembly, meaning that 200 of 300 members of the National Assembly must approve the bill. This article also states that any person against whom a motion for impeachment has been passed shall be suspended from exercising power until the impeachment has been adjudicated, and a decision on impeachment shall not extend further than removal from public office. However, impeachment shall not exempt the person impeached from civil or criminal liability for such violations.

By the Constitutional Court Act, the Constitutional Court must make a final decision within 180 days after it receives any case for adjudication, including impeachment cases. If the respondent has already left office before the pronouncement of the decision, the case is dismissed.

Three presidents have been impeached since the establishment of the Republic of Korea in 1948. Roh Moo-hyun in 2004 was impeached by the National Assembly, but the impeachment was overturned by the Constitutional Court. Park Geun-hye was impeached by the National Assembly in 2016, and the impeachment was confirmed by the Constitutional Court on 10 March 2017. Yoon Suk Yeol was impeached by the National Assembly on 14 December 2024, and the impeachment was confirmed by the Constitutional Court on 4 April 2025. Han Duck-soo became the first acting president to be impeached on 27 December 2024. Although Han held presidential powers, the National Assembly considered him a cabinet minister who was merely acting as president, allowing him to be removed by a simple majority rather than the two-thirds required of presidents holding the office.

== Presidential office ==
The Cheong Wa Dae (Korean: 청와대; Hanja: 靑瓦臺) or Blue House was built upon a Joseon-era royal garden. It is a complex of multiple buildings built largely in the traditional Korean architectural style with some modern architectural elements and facilities. Cheong Wa Dae consists of the Main Office Hall Bon-gwan, (Note: 본관; 本館; lit. ''Main House'') the Presidential Residence, the State Reception House Yeongbin-gwan, (Note: 영빈관; 迎賓館; lit. ''Welcome-Guest House'') and several other buildings and structures. The entire complex covers approximately 250,000 square metres or 62 acres. While the Blue House served as an executive office, it was one of the most protected official residences in Asia.

Upon the inauguration of President Yoon Suk Yeol in May 2022, Cheong Wa Dae was relieved of its duties as the official residence and executive office of the president and fully converted to a public park. The president's office and residence were moved to the Office of the President of South Korea (formerly the Ministry of National Defense building) in the Yongsan District of Seoul. Following Yoon Suk Yeol's impeachment, his successor Lee Jae Myung is planning to restore Cheong Wa Dae as the official residence.

== Compensation and privileges of office ==
As of 2021, the president receives a salary of ₩240,648,000 along with an undisclosed expense account to cover travel, goods and services while in office.

In addition, the presidency of the republic maintains the Chongri Gonggwan ("Official Residence of the Prime Minister") and the Prime Ministers Office in Seoul. The Chongri Gonggwan is the prime minister's official residence and official workplace. The prime minister is allowed use of all other official government offices and residences.

The president also has many regional offices, especially in the major cities, and are ready to receive the president at any time. Although not residences, they are owned by the national government and are used when the president is in the region or city.

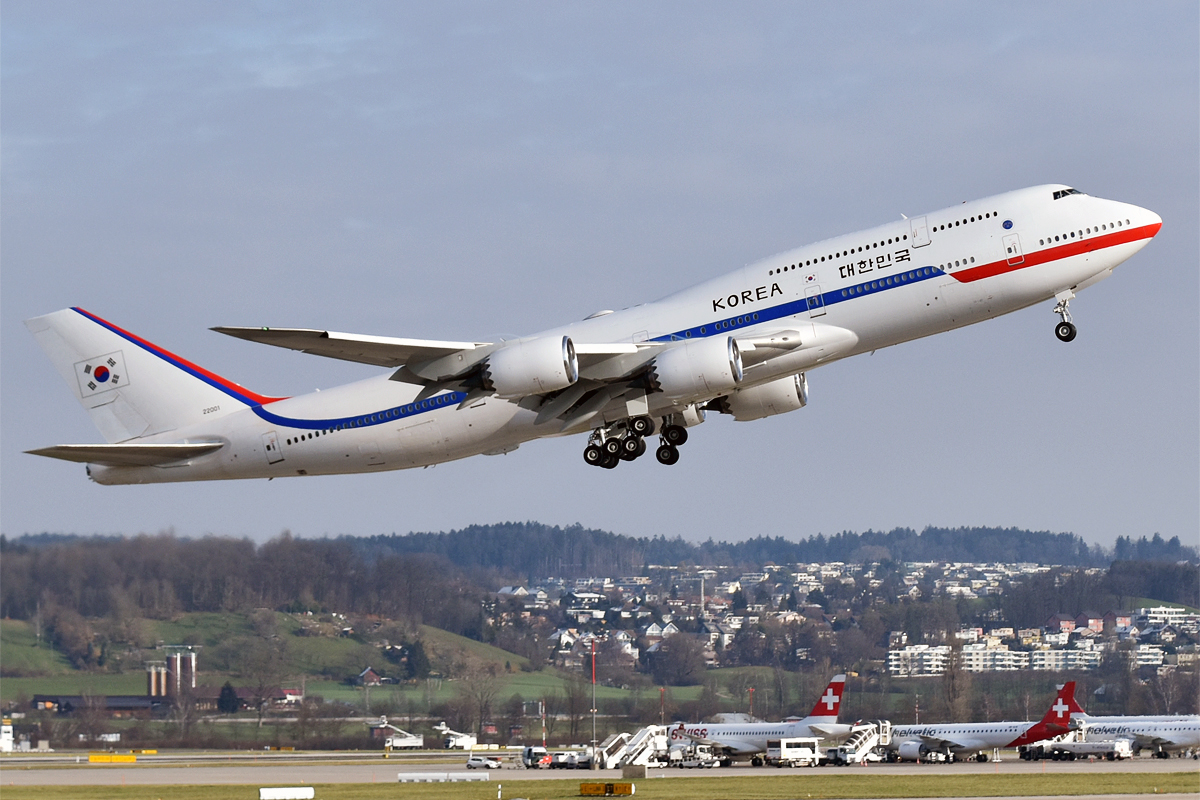
A Code One Boeing 747-8i flying in South Korean government's colors

For ground travel the president uses a highly modified Hyundai Nexo SUV to serve as the presidential state vehicle. For air travel the president uses a highly modified plane, which is a military version of the Boeing 747-8 with the call sign Code One, and a highly modified helicopter, which is a military version of the Sikorsky S-92 that serves as the presidential helicopter.

== Post-presidency ==
All former presidents receive a lifelong pension and Presidential Security Service detail. Unlike the prime minister, a former president cannot decline PSS protection. In recent years, South Korean presidents have had controversial post-presidencies; four of the last six have served time in prison.

Impeached presidents are stripped of their post-presidential benefits, such as pensions, free medical services, state funding for post-retirement offices, personal assistants and a chauffeur, and the right to burial at the Seoul National Cemetery after death. However, such individuals are still entitled to retain security protection under the Presidential Security Act.

== Order of succession ==
Article 71 of the Constitution of South Korea states, 'In the event of the president not being able to discharge the duties of his/her office, the Prime Minister and ministers in line of the order of succession shall be the acting president.' Article 68 of the Constitution requires the acting president to hold new elections within 60 days if the presidency is vacant or the president is permanently incapacitated.

== Symbols ==
The primary symbols of the president are the seal, used to authenticate official acts, and the standard, which is flown when the president is present.

Presidential standard

Presidential seal

This emblem incorporates the main symbol of the presidency and appears prominently on some podiums or meeting rooms. It is sometimes erreously referred to as the presidential seal.

The phoenixes and rose of sharon have been the official symbol of the presidency since 1967, but were used unofficially as early as 1955. Along with appearing on the standard, it can be seen on buildings associated with the presidency and other materials, and previously appeared on the emblem of the presidential office from 2022 to 2025.

The emblem of Cheong Wa Dae

== Timeline of presidents ==
Ideology	#	Time in office	Name(s)
Conservative	9	21765 days	Choi Kyu-hah, Chun Doo-hwan, Kim Young-sam, Lee Myung-bak, Park Chung Hee, Park Geun-hye, Roh Tae-woo, Syngman Rhee, and Yoon Suk Yeol
Liberal	5	6600 days (Note: As of 18 November 2026.)	Kim Dae-jung, Lee Jae Myung (incumbent), Moon Jae-in, Roh Moo-hyun, and Yun Po-sun

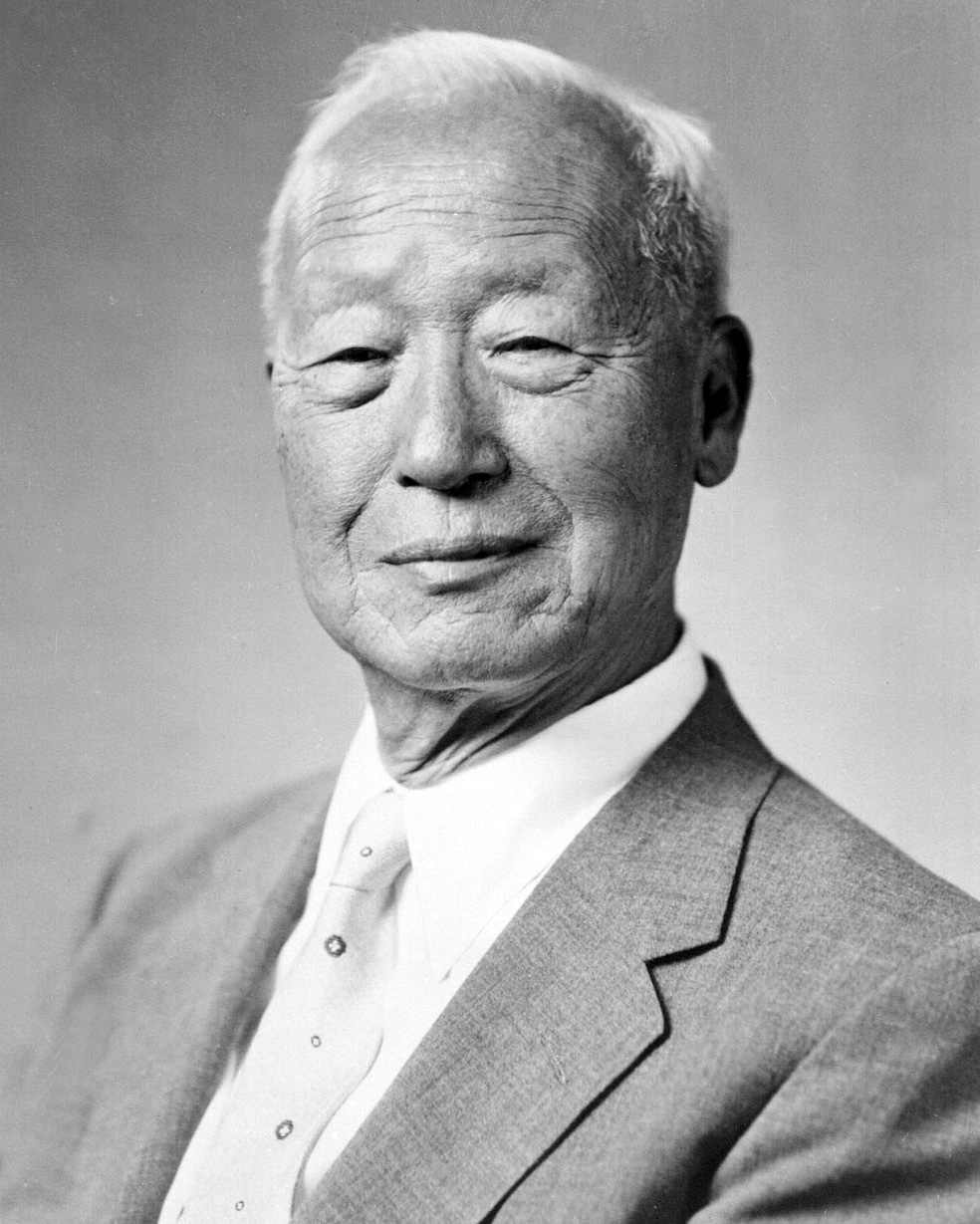
1st: Syngman Rhee
1st, 2nd & 3rd terms
(served: 1948–1960)

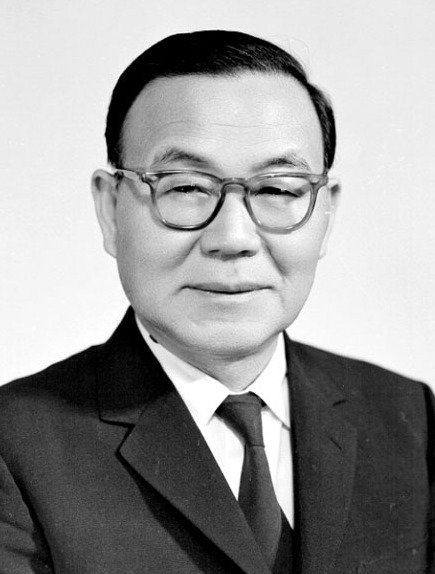
2nd: Yun Po-sun
4th term
(served: 1960–1962)

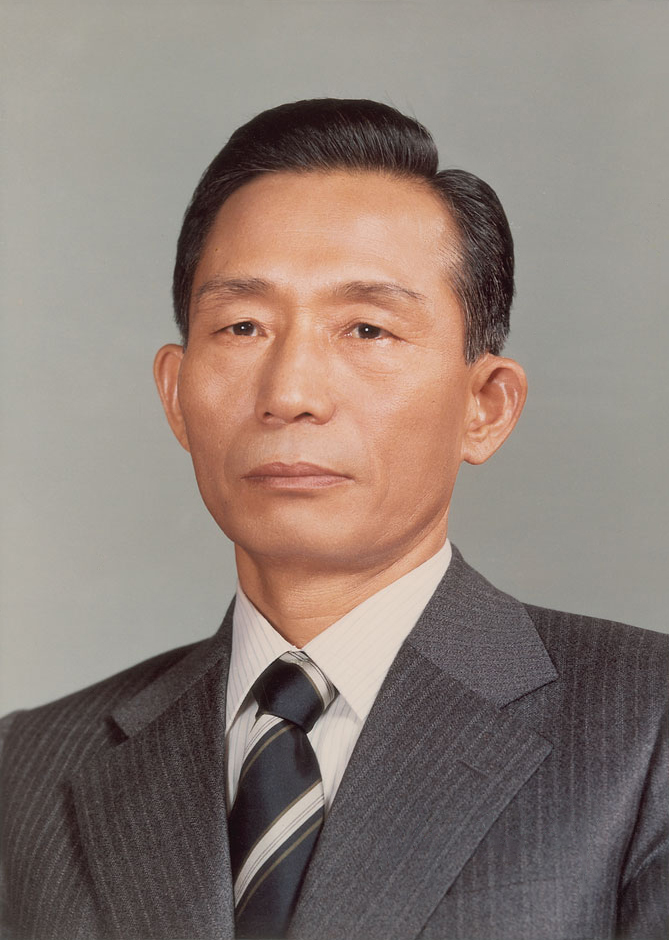
3rd: Park Chung Hee
5th, 6th, 7th, 8th & 9th terms
(served: 1963–1979)

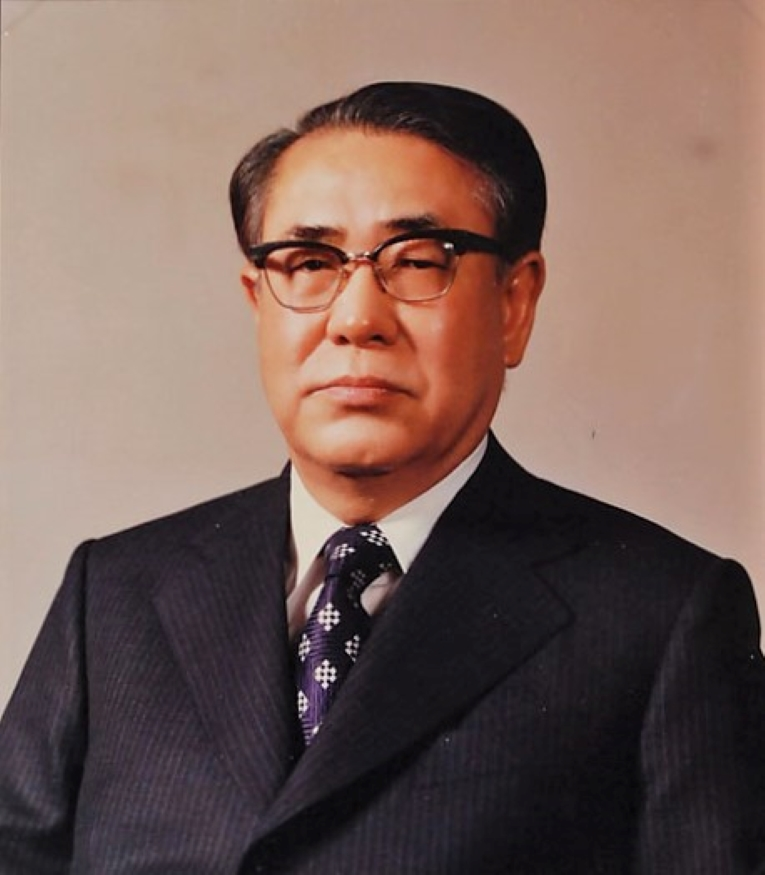
4th: Choi Kyu-hah
10th term
(served: 1979–1980)

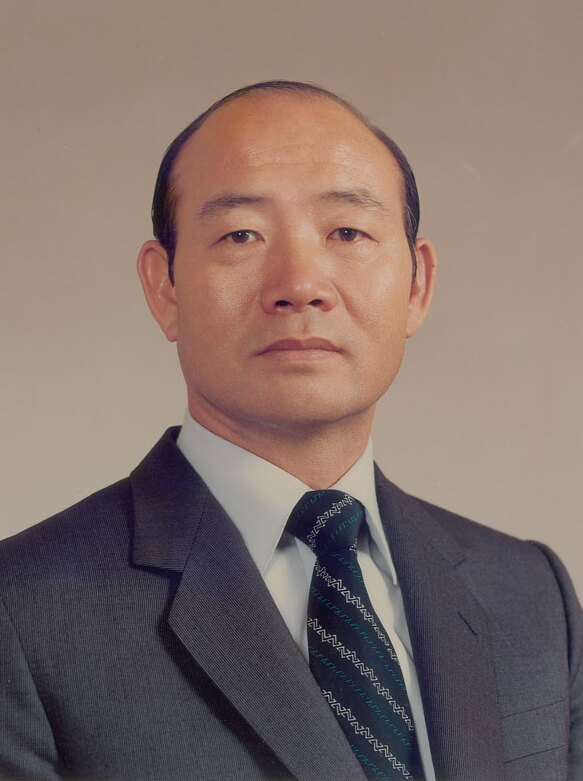
5th: Chun Doo-hwan
11th & 12th terms
(served: 1980–1988)

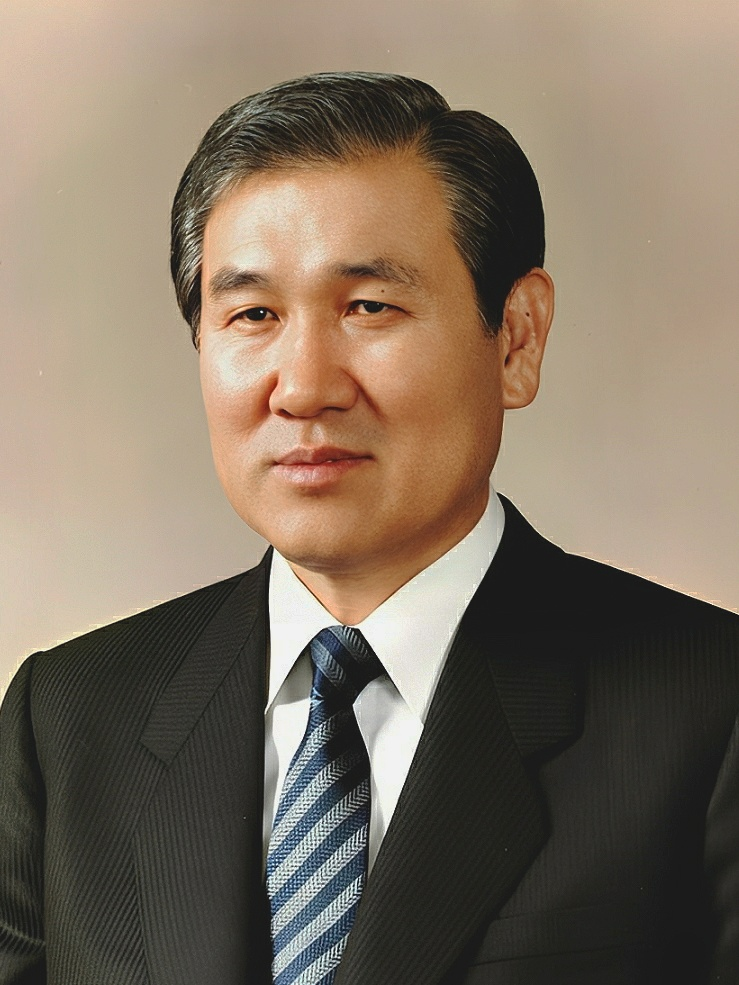
6th: Roh Tae-woo
13th term
(served: 1988–1993)

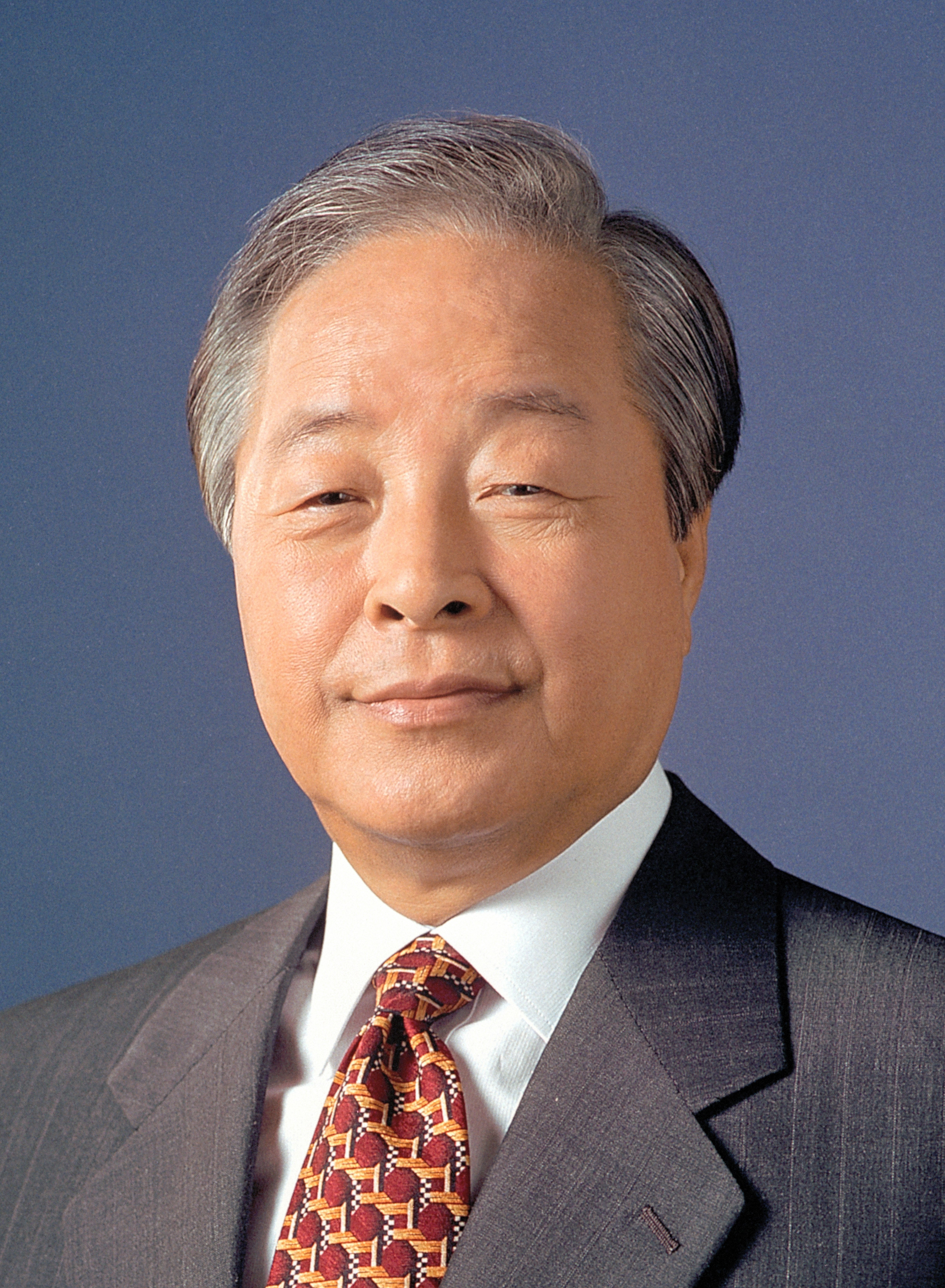
7th: Kim Young-sam
14th term
(served: 1993–1998)

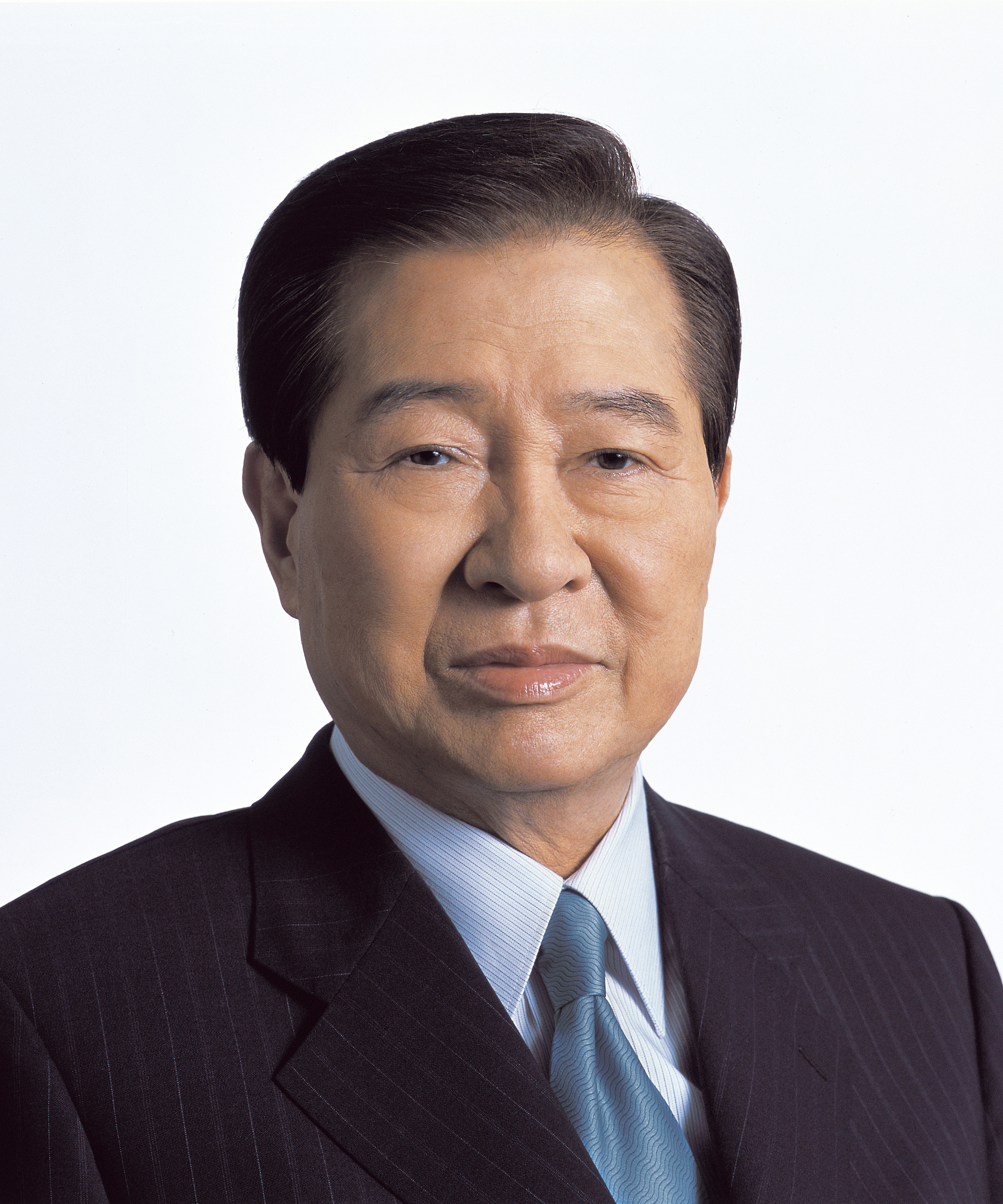
8th: Kim Dae-jung
15th term
(served: 1998–2003)

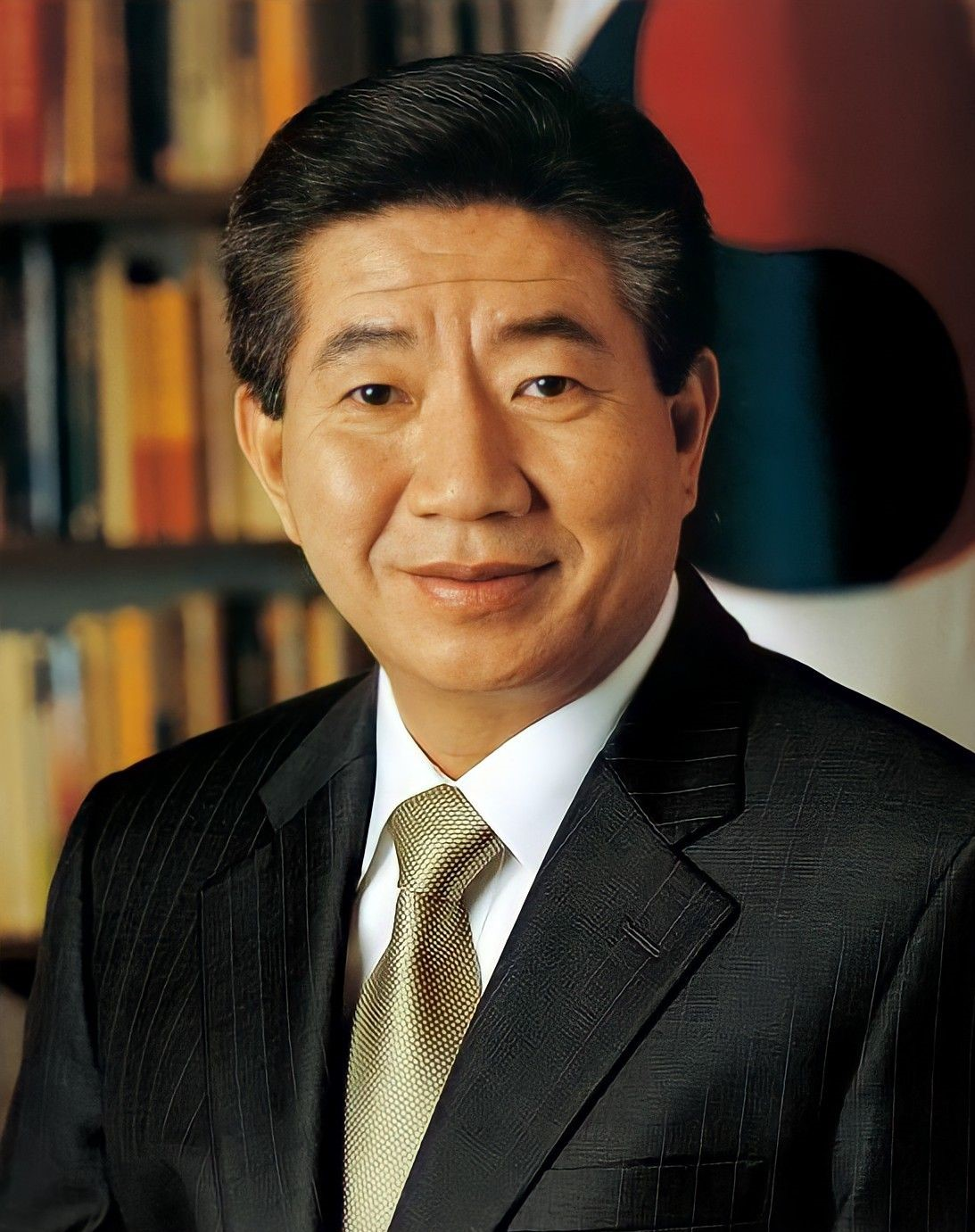
9th: Roh Moo-hyun
16th term
(served: 2003–2008 (Note: Goh Kun served as acting president during Roh's suspension from 12 March 2004 to 14 May 2004.))

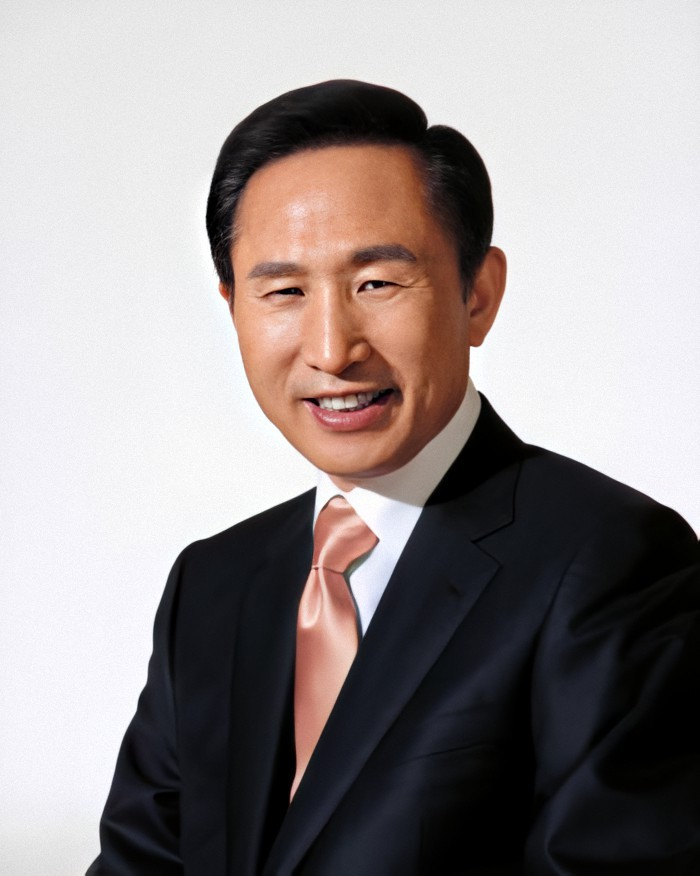
10th: Lee Myung-bak
17th term
(served: 2008–2013)

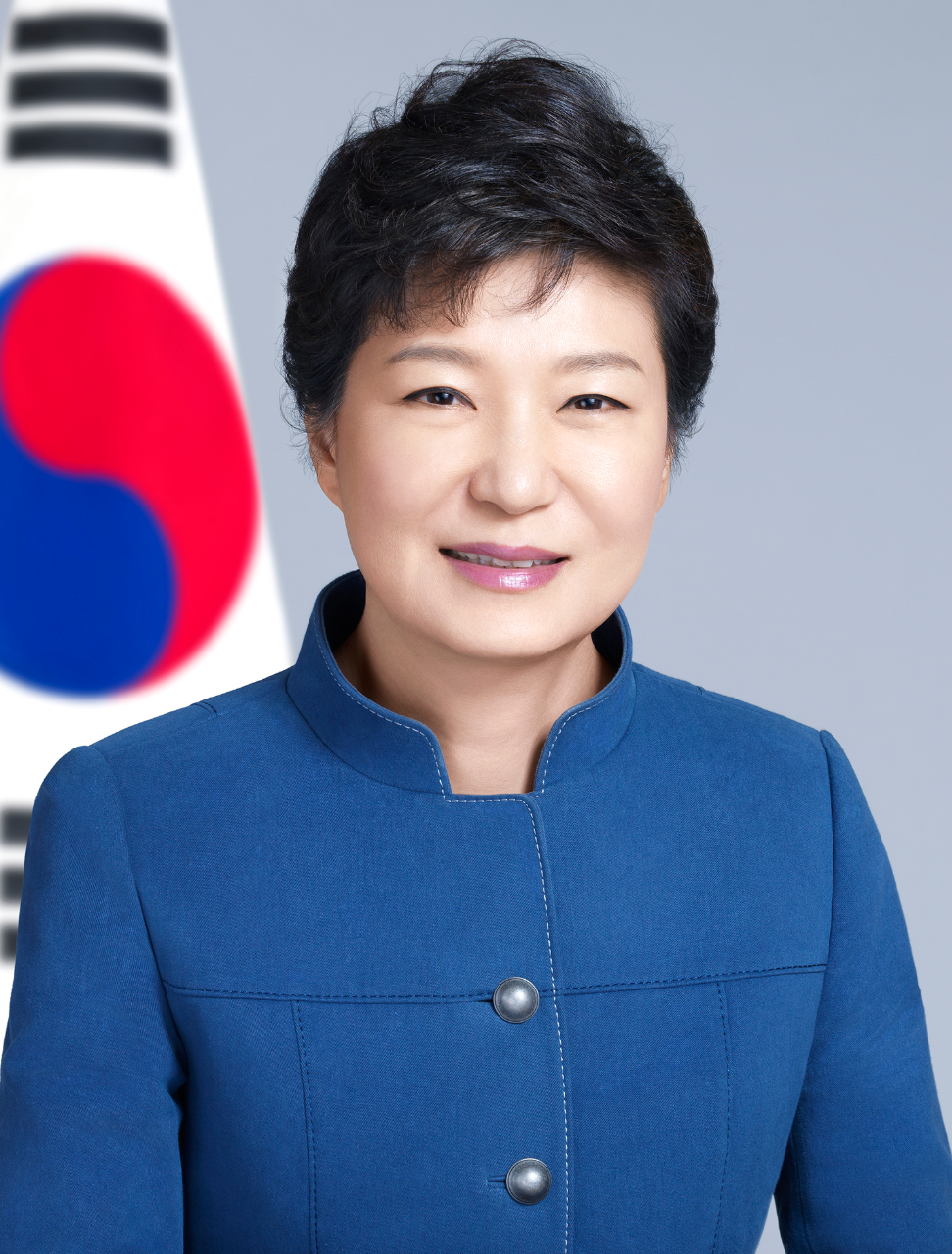
11th: Park Geun-hye
18th term
(served: 2013–2017 (Note: Hwang Kyo-ahn served as acting president during Park's suspension from 9 December 2016 to 10 May 2017.))

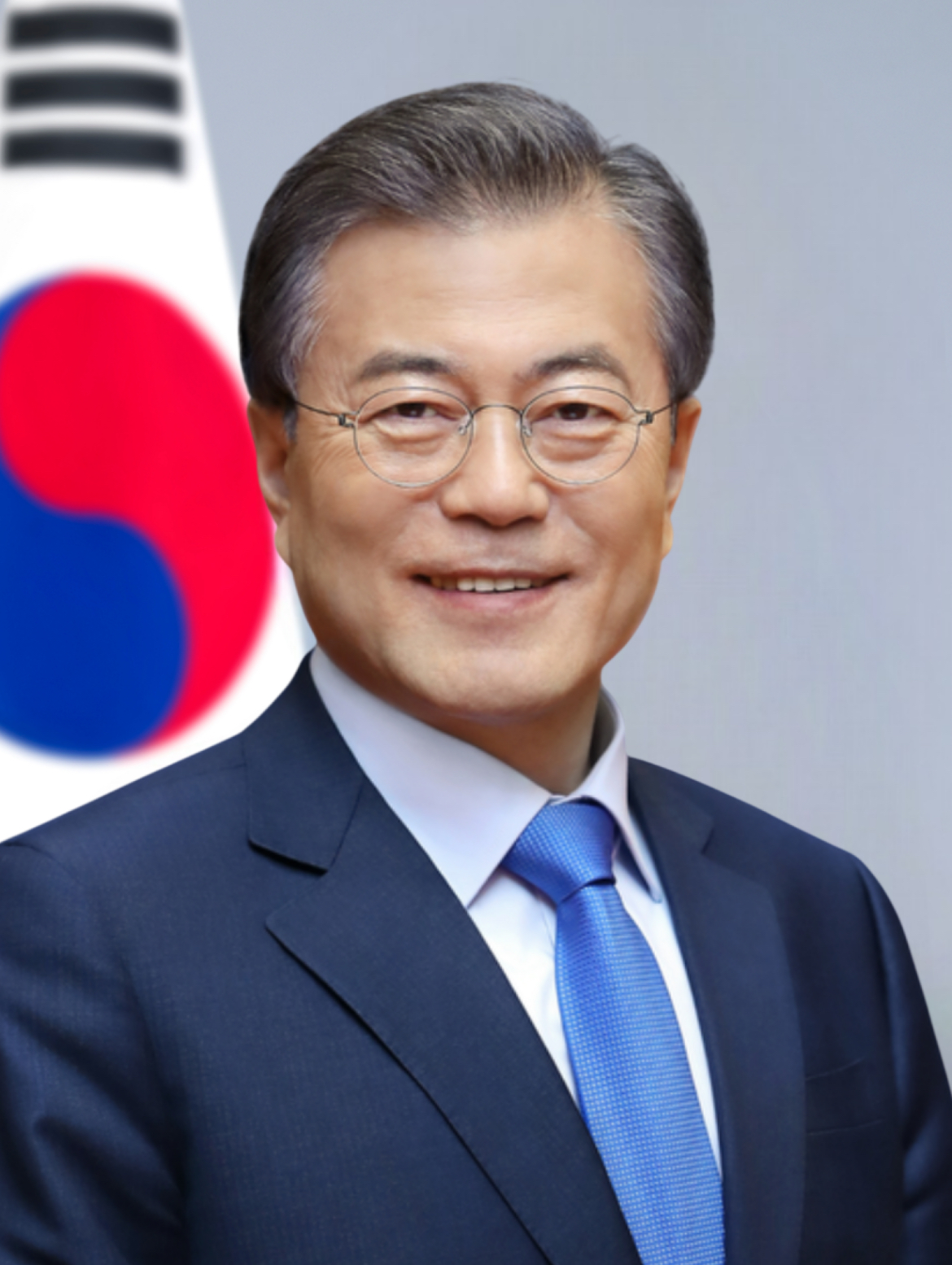
12th: Moon Jae-in
19th term
(served: 2017–2022)

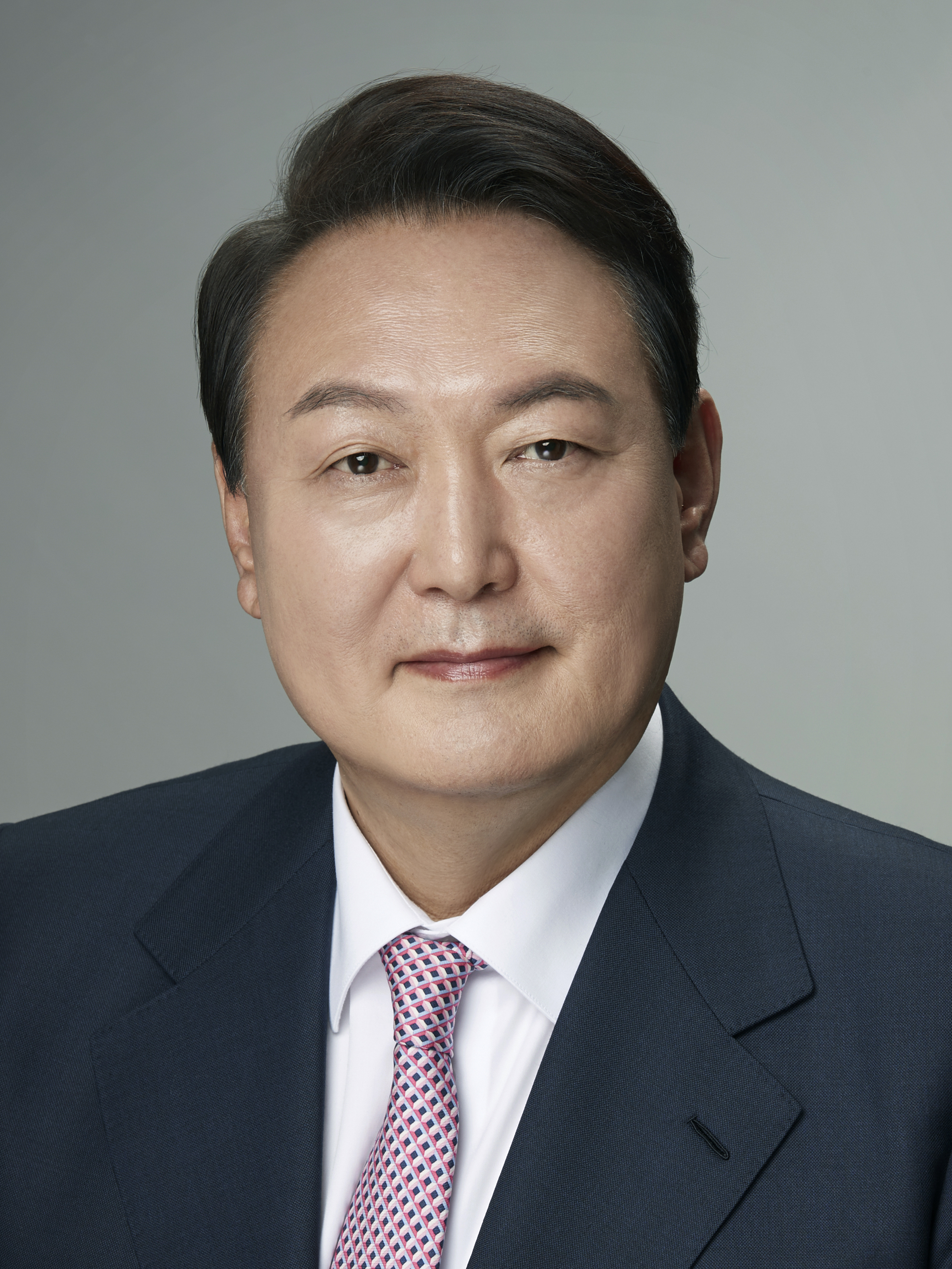
13th: Yoon Suk Yeol
20th term
(served: 2022–2025 (Note: Han Duck-soo served as acting president from 14 December 2024 to his own impeachment on 27 December 2024. Choi Sang-mok served as acting president from 27 December 2024 to 24 March 2025 during Han's impeachment trial. Han was reinstated as acting president on 24 March 2025 after his impeachment was overturned, and the court upheld the impeachment of Yoon in a unanimous decision on 4 April 2025, removing Yoon from office. Han resigned on 1 May 2025 and since then Lee Ju-ho served as acting president until the election of Lee Jae Myung on 4 June 2025.))

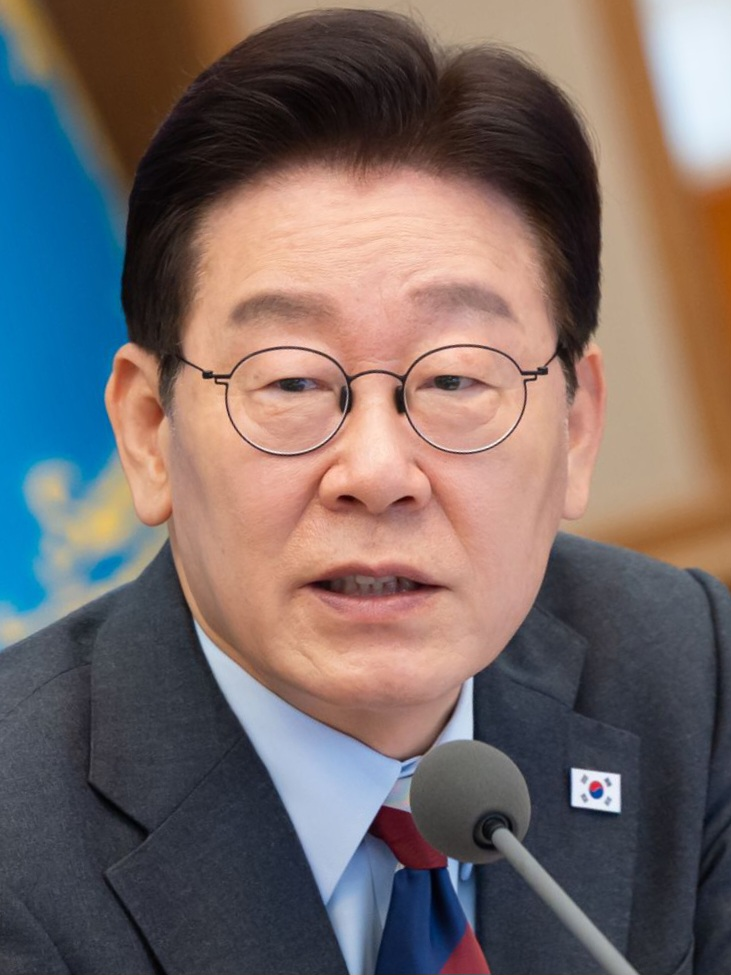
14th: Lee Jae Myung
21st term
(serving: 2025–present)

== See also ==
- 2025 South Korean presidential election
- First Lady of South Korea
- List of international trips made by presidents of South Korea
- List of leaders of North Korea
- List of official vehicles of the president of South Korea
- List of presidents of South Korea
- List of presidents of South Korea by time in office
- Presidential elections in South Korea
- Transportation of the president of South Korea
- Vice President of South Korea
