= Brazilian presidential helicopter =

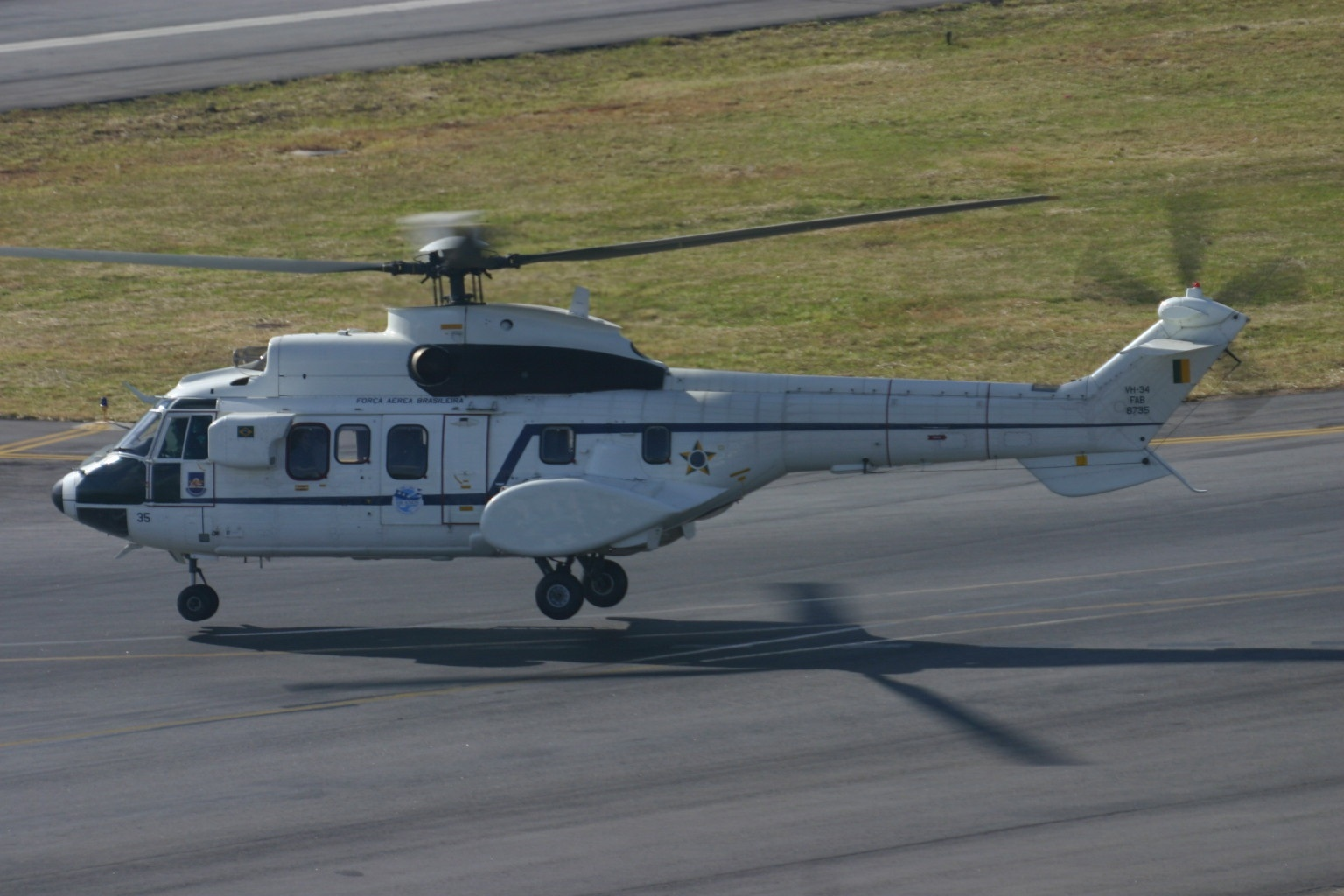
VH-34 Brazilian Presidential Helicopter

The Brazilian Presidential Helicopter is the Brazilian Air Force helicopter used to transport the President of Brazil. The current aircraft designation is VH-36 Caracal.

Two modified military versions of the Eurocopter Cougar, tail numbers 8737 and 8740, are currently used as the main presidential helicopters. The aircraft is configured to carry fifteen passengers plus three crew members.

== See also ==
- Marine One
- Presidential State Car of the United States
- Presidential Helicopter of South Korea
- Presidential State Car of South Korea
