= List of official vehicles of the president of South Korea =

This is a list of official vehicles of the president of South Korea, past and present.

== State vehicles ==
- Syngman Rhee: Cadillac Series 62 sedan
- Yun Posun: Cadillac Series 62 sedan
- Park Chung Hee: Cadillac Series 75 limousine and sedan, Sixty Special Brougham, Mercedes-Benz 600, and Chevrolet Biscayne
- Choi Kyu-hah: KIA Peugeot 604, Mercedes-Benz 380SEL
- Chun Doo-hwan: Cadillac Fleetwood Brougham Limousine
- Roh Tae-woo: Cadillac Fleetwood Brougham Limousine
- Kim Young-sam: Cadillac Fleetwood Brougham Limousine, Mercedes-Benz V140 S600 Guard
- Kim Dae-jung: Mercedes-Benz W220 S600 Guard, Hyundai Equus Limousine
- Roh Moo-hyun: BMW E65 Security 760Li, Mercedes-Benz W220 S600 Guard
- Lee Myung-bak: BMW E65 Security 760Li, Mercedes-Benz W221 S600 Pullman Guard, and Hyundai Equus Stretch Edition
- Park Geun-hye: Hyundai Equus VL500 limousine
- Moon Jae-in: Mercedes-Maybach W222 S600 Guard, Genesis EQ900, and Hyundai Nexo SUV

== Aircraft ==
PAST:

- Before the 747-400 was leased, the President normally travelled on a Boeing 747 aircraft painted in a Korean Air or Asiana Airlines livery. The presidential seal would be mounted on the forward passenger door to show that that aircraft is carrying the President.
- Before the Sikorsky S-92 was purchased the president would usually fly on a South Korean Air Force helicopter and after official use was concluded it would be reverted to use by the Air Force.

PRESENT:

- A highly modified Boeing 747-400 used since its lease in 2010 from Korean Air known by its callsign "Code One". The lease is due to end in March 2020 and the bidding process by Korean Air and Asiana Airlines has already opened and a decision will be made by the South Korean government later in 2020.
- A highly modified Sikorsky S-92 helicopter has served as the Presidential Helicopter Since 2007 of which it was purchased by the Presidential Security Service and the South Korean Air Force as part of the VC-X Program.

== See also ==
- Air transports of heads of state and government
- Code One
- Official state car
- President of South Korea
- Presidential Helicopter of South Korea
- Presidential State Car of South Korea
- Transportation of the President of South Korea
