= South Korean presidential helicopter =

Helicopter used to transport the President of South Korea

The South Korean Presidential Helicopter is a Republic of Korea Air Force helicopter used to transport the President of South Korea. The current aircraft tail number is 05050.

Three highly modified military versions of the Sikorsky S-92 helicopter are currently used as the presidential helicopters. The aircraft are configured to carry 22 passengers, with two crew members.

The helicopter has an array of offensive and defensive safety measures which are mostly classified in nature, to keep the president safe.

== Acquirement ==
In 2007 the South Korean Air Force and the Presidential Security Service ordered three highly modified Sikorsky S-92 helicopters to serve as the Presidential Helicopter as part of the VC-X program. They are stationed at Seoul Air Base.

== Security ==
Very little is known about the security equipment of the helicopters, with most information being classified. It is known that the aircraft have infrared vision, missile defence systems, secure communication lines, flares to deflect heat-seeking missiles, and a radar warning system.

== Current operations ==
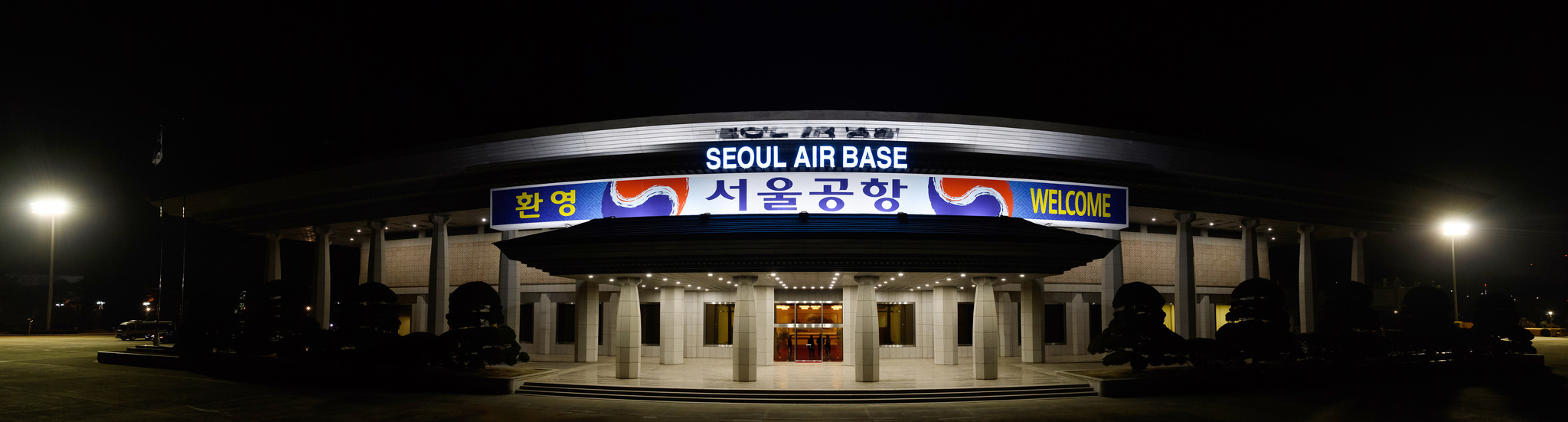
Seoul Air Base where the helicopters are stored

The Presidential Helicopter is sometimes the preferred alternative to motorcades, which can be expensive and logistically difficult. The controlled environment of a helicopter is also felt to add a safety factor. The fleet is also used to transport senior cabinet staff and foreign dignitaries and first family members.

As a security measure, the Presidential Helicopter always flies in a group of three identical helicopters. One helicopter carries the president, while the others serve as decoys. Upon take-off these helicopters shift in formation to obscure the location of the president.

To add to the security of the helicopter, all members of staff have to go through rigorous background checks and mental health checks before touching any helicopter used for presidential travel or being in the presence of the president at all.

== See also ==
- Air transports of heads of state and government
- Code One
- List of official vehicles of the president of South Korea
- President of South Korea
- Presidential State Car of South Korea
- Transportation of the President of South Korea
