= Avion Presidente Juarez =

Mexican presidential airplane

Avion Presidente Juarez was a former Mexican presidential airplane.

TP-01 Presidente Juarez.

== History ==
The plane was certified to fly by instruments under any weather conditions, had a range of nearly eleven hours of flight and can travel six thousand miles per tank at cruising speed. Inside, the Benito Juarez has room for 66 passengers and 15 crew members. At the center of the ship there was an area reserved for the President, which includes an office, bedroom and bathroom. In addition, due to spending enough time in hangar-unlike, for example, the Air Force of Argentina and Chile, which were open-parked, weather-related damage to this particular plane was relatively minimal. However, it had not been without incident. On February 8, 2008, Benito Juárez staggered before landing in Newark, New Jersey, so the pilot had to balance the plane to prevent from proceeding to the grasslands of the Newark airport.

The plane was eventually demoted, retired, then auctioned off in 2021.

=== Previous planes ===
- El Mexicano The Mexican
- Francisco Zarco
- El Ciudad de México The Mexico City
- El Tenochtitlán, El Guanajuato, El Jalisco, El Puebla
- Miguel Hidalgo (a.k.a. El Topo Gigio)
- Quetzalcoatl I and Quetzalcoatl II

== Sections ==
It had two sections. The first section was called the VIP section, and the second section was the regular section. On the first section the president, special guests and the leader of the Estado Mayor Presidencial travelled; journalists and military personnel travelled in the second section.

== Other aircraft ==
The Mexican president also uses smaller airplanes for local trips. Some such as a Gulfstream III. Other airplanes used are Learjet 36A, Learjet 35A and Rockwell Turbocommander 695A. Helicopters are also used such as Eurocopter Super Puma and Puma.

This is a list of all presidential aircraft in 2010 The current presidential fleet as of 2010 is as follows:

Aircraft	Registration	Code Name
Boeing 757-225	XC-UJM	TP-01
Boeing 737-300	XC-UJB	TP-02
Boeing 737-322	XC-LJG	TP-03
Gulfstream III	XC-UJN	TP-06
Gulfstream III	XC-UJO	TP-07
Learjet 35A	XC-IPP	TP-104
Rockwell Turbocommander 695A	XC-UTA	TP-216
Super Puma AS332	XC-UHV	TPH-01
Super Puma AS332	XC-UHU	TPH-02
Super Puma AS332	XC-UHO	TPH-03
Super Puma AS332	XC-UHM	TPH-05
Super Puma AS332	XC-UHP	TPH-06
Puma SA330	XC-UHC	TPH-08
Puma SA330	XC-UHA	TPH-09

== See also ==
- Air Force One
- Air transports of heads of state and government
- Russian presidential aircraft - Official aircraft of the President of Russia
