= Code One =

Republic of Korea Air Force aircraft which carries the President of South Korea

Code One, commonly known as Korean Air Force One, is the name of the Republic of Korea Air Force aircraft which carries the President of South Korea. The current aircraft is a specially upgraded Boeing 747-8i leased from Korean Air.

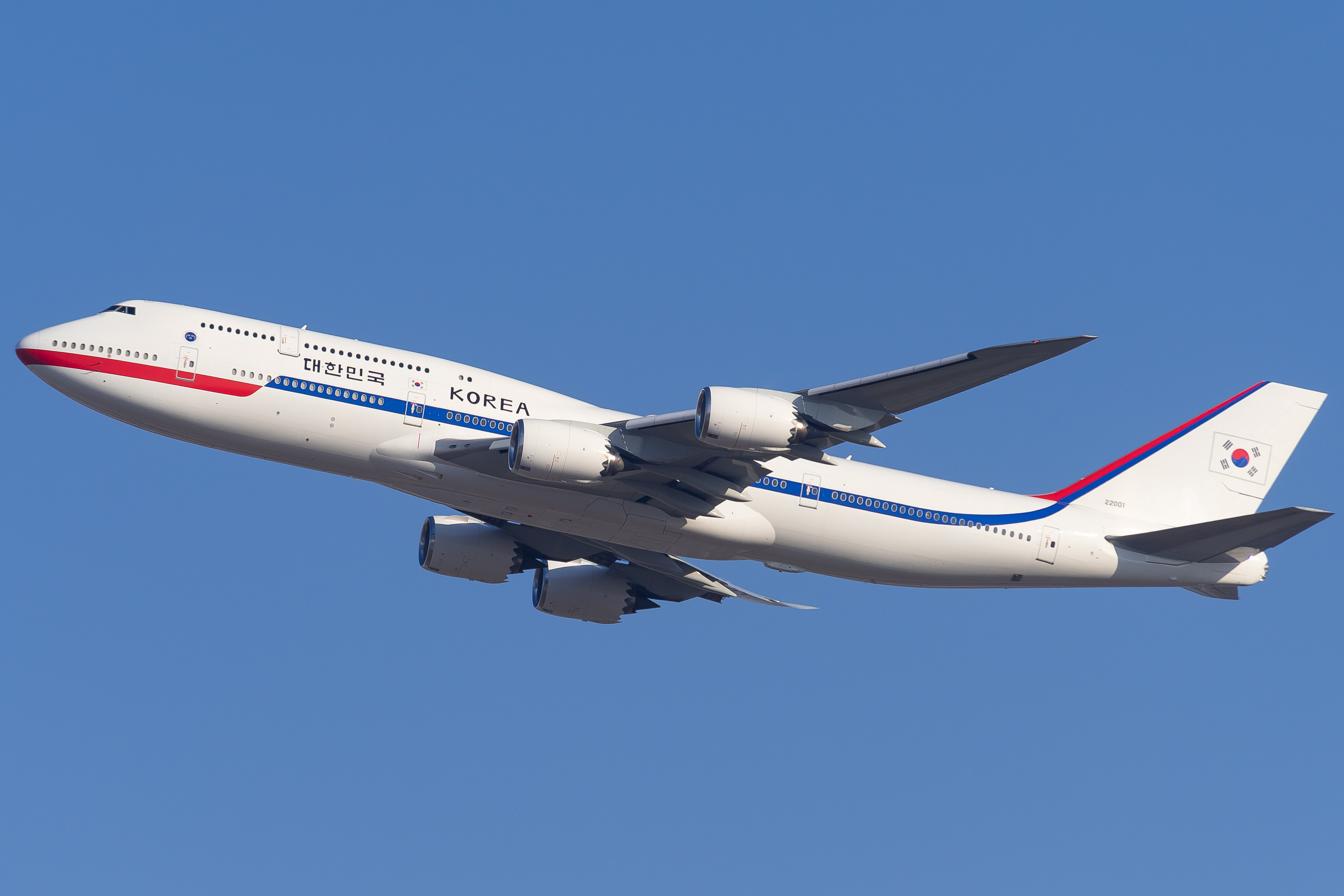
The current Code One plane is a Boeing 747-8i.

Historically, the lease for Code One has been filled by either Korean Air or Asiana Airlines. It was reported in 2018 that Korean Air's lease expires in March 2021 and that a bidding process was open to secure a new lease. Government officials said that low-cost carriers might be requested to submit bids, in addition to those requested by Asiana Airlines and Korean Air.

The aircraft has undergone a "full-scale renovation" which includes "decorating the exterior", as well as customising the interior to include a sleeping area and office, as well as reinforcement to protect the president's security.

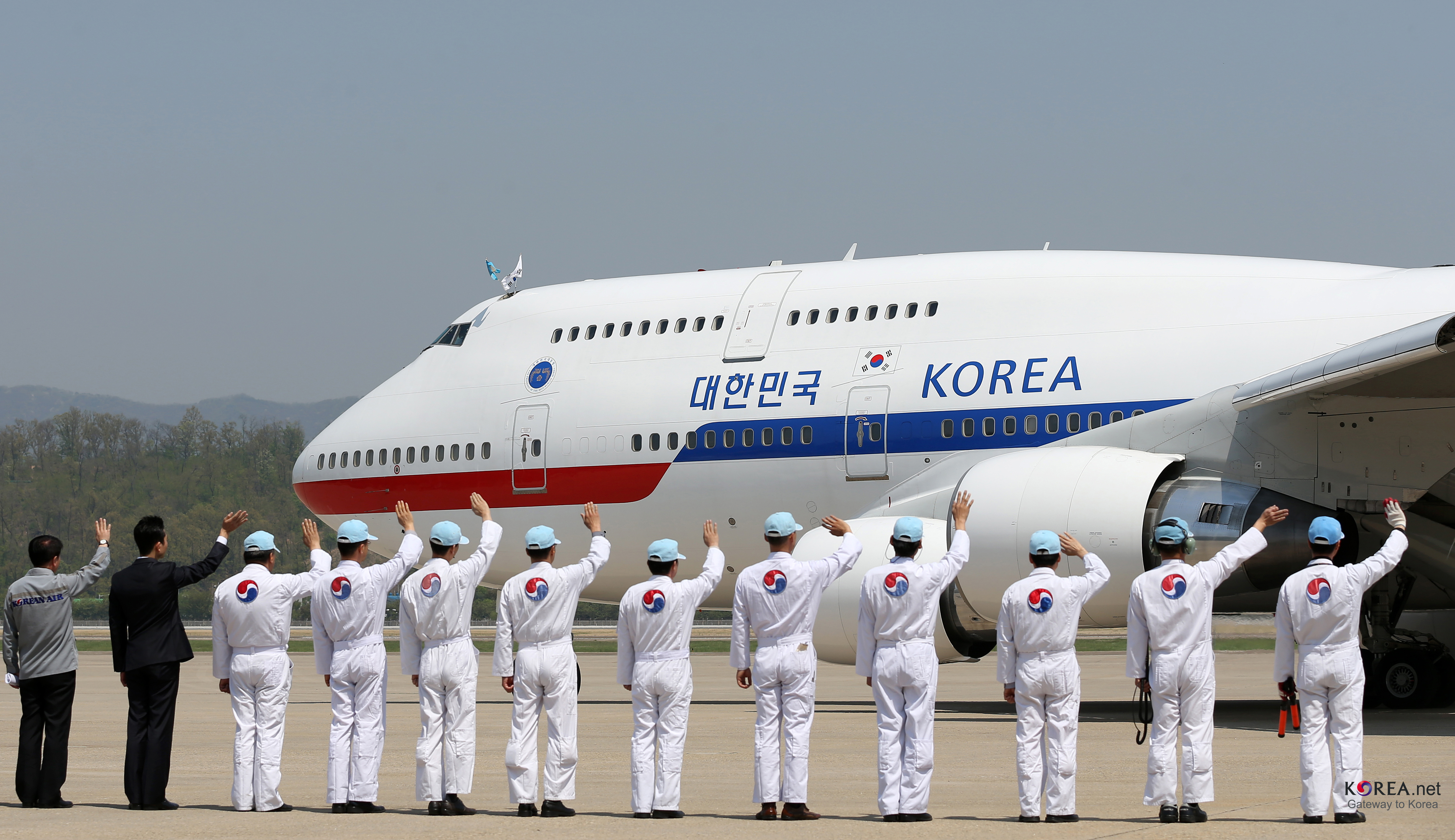
Personnel of Seoul Air Base and Korean Air waving to the now-decommissioned Code One 747-400 aircraft carrying then president Park Geun-hye.

The current presidential plane has been in service since January 2022 after extensive retrofitting and inspection. There is also an identical plane of the same type that travels with the president at all times for security purposes and to act as a backup in case of an emergency.

== Acquisition ==
In 2010 as part of the VC-X program the Republic of Korea Air Force along with the Presidential Security Service leased a Boeing 747-400 from Korean Air to serve as Code One. The contract was extended until 2021 due to an administrative problem.

In March 2020, the lease for Code One ended and the bidding process from Korean Air and Asiana Airlines began. When the bidding process was concluded the South Korean Air Force and the Presidential Security Service decided that Korean Air would get the contract to provide the new Code One aircraft.

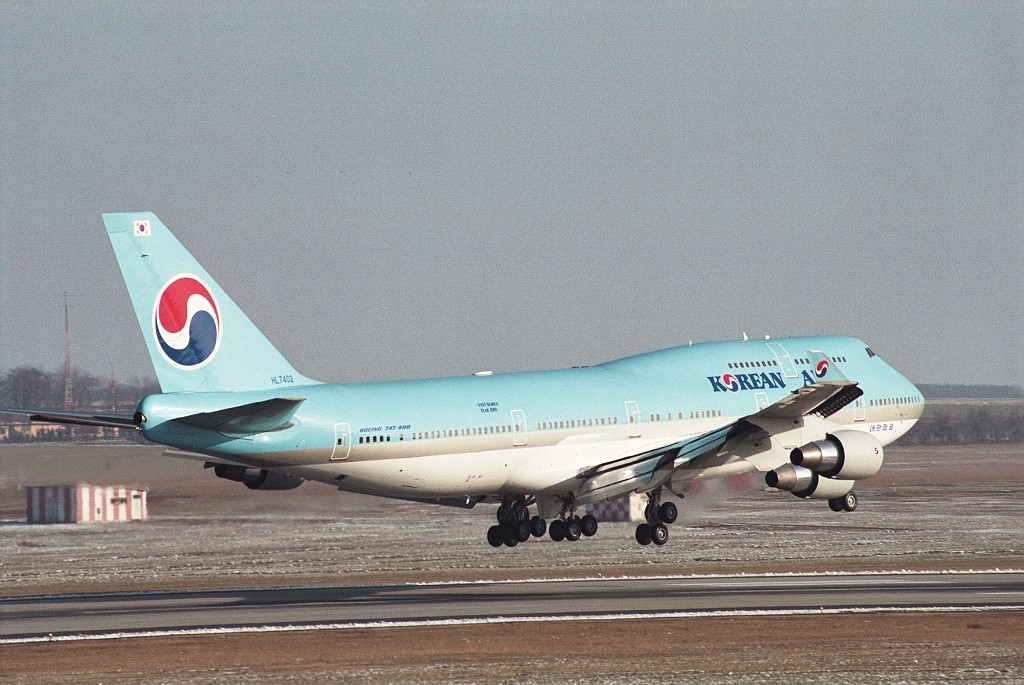
A Code One-designated Korean Air commercial Boeing 747-400 landing with former president Kim Dae-jung onboard.

== Other Presidential Aircraft ==
Before 2010, the President travelled in a reconfigured Boeing 747 provided by either Korean Air or Asiana Airlines which temporarily served as Code One with the Presidential seal displayed. When official use was over, the aircraft reverted to use as a commercial aircraft.

== Security ==
Code One has an array of security measures, most of which are classified. Code One is equipped with advanced communications and defense systems including radar-signal jammers and flares to defend against heat-seeking missiles.

== Interior ==
The interior of the aircraft is mostly classified. It is known that the aircraft is reconfigured with an office and a bedroom among other amenities. Code One is not only meant for travel and comfort but also as a command post, used for the president to lead the country from anywhere in the world. It allows them to fulfil their duties as Commander-in-Chief and supreme authority of the armed forces.

== See also ==
- Air transports of heads of state and government
- List of official vehicles of the president of South Korea
- President of South Korea
- Transportation of the president of South Korea
