= Alpina B12 =

Range of high performance automobiles

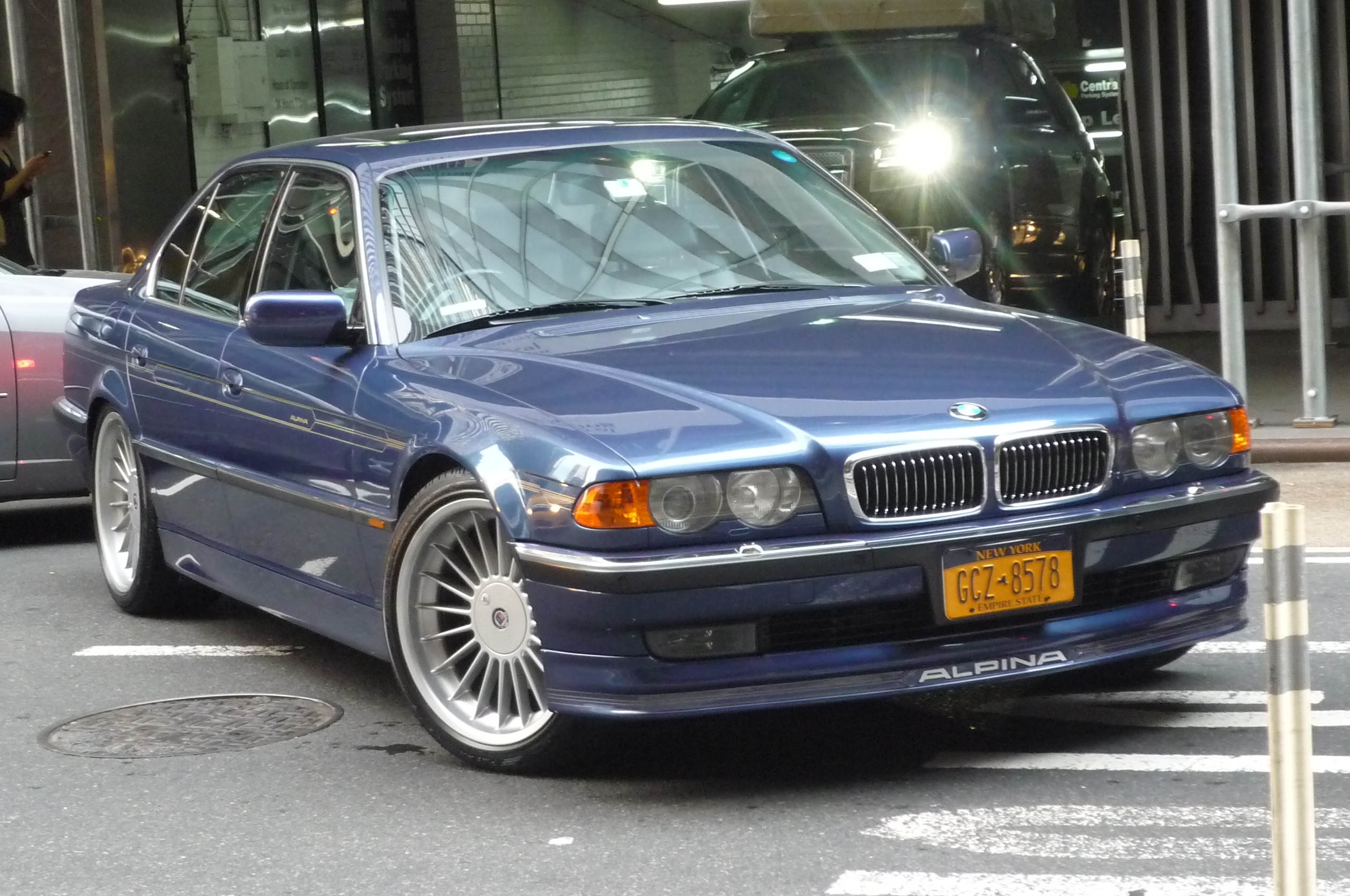
- Alpina B12 6.0 (E38)

Overview
- Manufacturer: Alpina Burkard Bovensiepen GmbH & Co. KG
- Production: 1988–2001
- Assembly: Germany: Buchloe

Body and chassis
- Class: Full-size luxury car (F); Grand tourer (S)
- Body style: 2-door coupé; 4-door saloon; 4-door long wheelbase saloon
- Layout: Front-engine, rear-wheel-drive
- Related: BMW 7 Series (E32); BMW 7 Series (E38); BMW 8 Series (E31)

Powertrain
- Engine: 5.0 L BMW M70 V12; 5.7 L BMW S70B56 V12; 5.7–6.0 L BMW M73 V12
- Transmission: 4-speed ZF automatic; 5-speed automatic; 6-speed Getrag manual; 6-speed Shift-Tronic clutchless manual

Chronology
- Successor: Alpina B7 (E65); Alpina B6 (E63)

The Alpina B12 is a name given to high-performance luxury automobiles manufactured by German automobile manufacturer Alpina. The B12 originally succeeded the B11 4.0 in 1988 which was based on the BMW 7 Series (E32) and was also based on the same car. Subsequent models were based on the BMW 7 Series (E38) and the BMW 8 Series (E31). Production ended in 2001 when the 7 Series (E38) models were discontinued. The B12 was replaced by the B7 (E65) and the B6 (E63).

== B12 5.0 (E32) ==
The B12 5.0 was introduced in 1988 and was the first Alpina production automobile to use a V12 engine as its predecessor, the B11 used 3.5 and 4.0 L V8 engines. The suffix 5.0 means the engine displacement which was unchanged from the standard BMW M70 V12. The B12 5.0 was based on the newly introduced 750i/iL. Exterior changes include a front chin spoiler, 17-inch multi-spoke alloy wheels, choice of special colours, "B12 5.0" badge at the rear, and Alpina pinstriping. The interior was customised according to customer specifications which ranged from a wide range of upholstery, steering wheel options, and gear knobs, and child seats. Standard interior features included an Alpina instrument cluster with a special 300 km/h (186 mph) speedometer and badging. The amenities provided on a standard 750i/iL, apart from the above changes, were retained. Each B12 5.0 was equipped with a special plaque on the interior containing a special identification number.

Mechanical changes included increased engine power to 257 kW (350 hp) and 470 N⋅m (347 lb⋅ft) of torque at 4,000 rpm. The engine was mated to a 4-speed automatic transmission manufactured by ZF Friedrichshafen and had modified gear ratios. Improved springs were installed with Bilstein shock absorbers at the front and Fichtel & Sachs shock absorbers at the rear.

The mechanical improvements enabled the B12 5.0 to accelerate to 100 km/h (62 mph) from a standstill in 6.9 seconds and attaining a top speed of 275 km/h (171 mph). Production of the B12 5.0 ceased in 1994, when the E32 models were phased out.

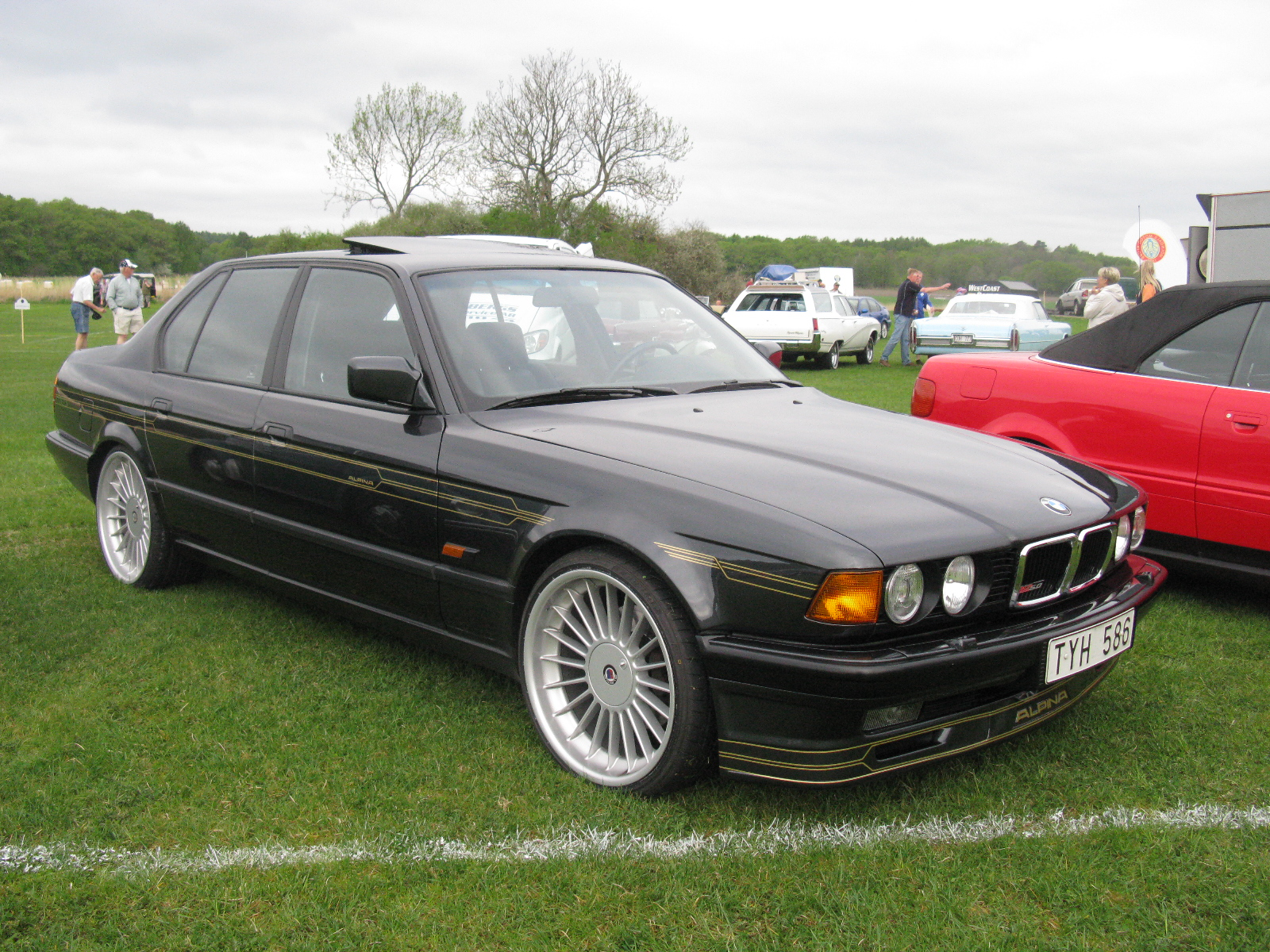
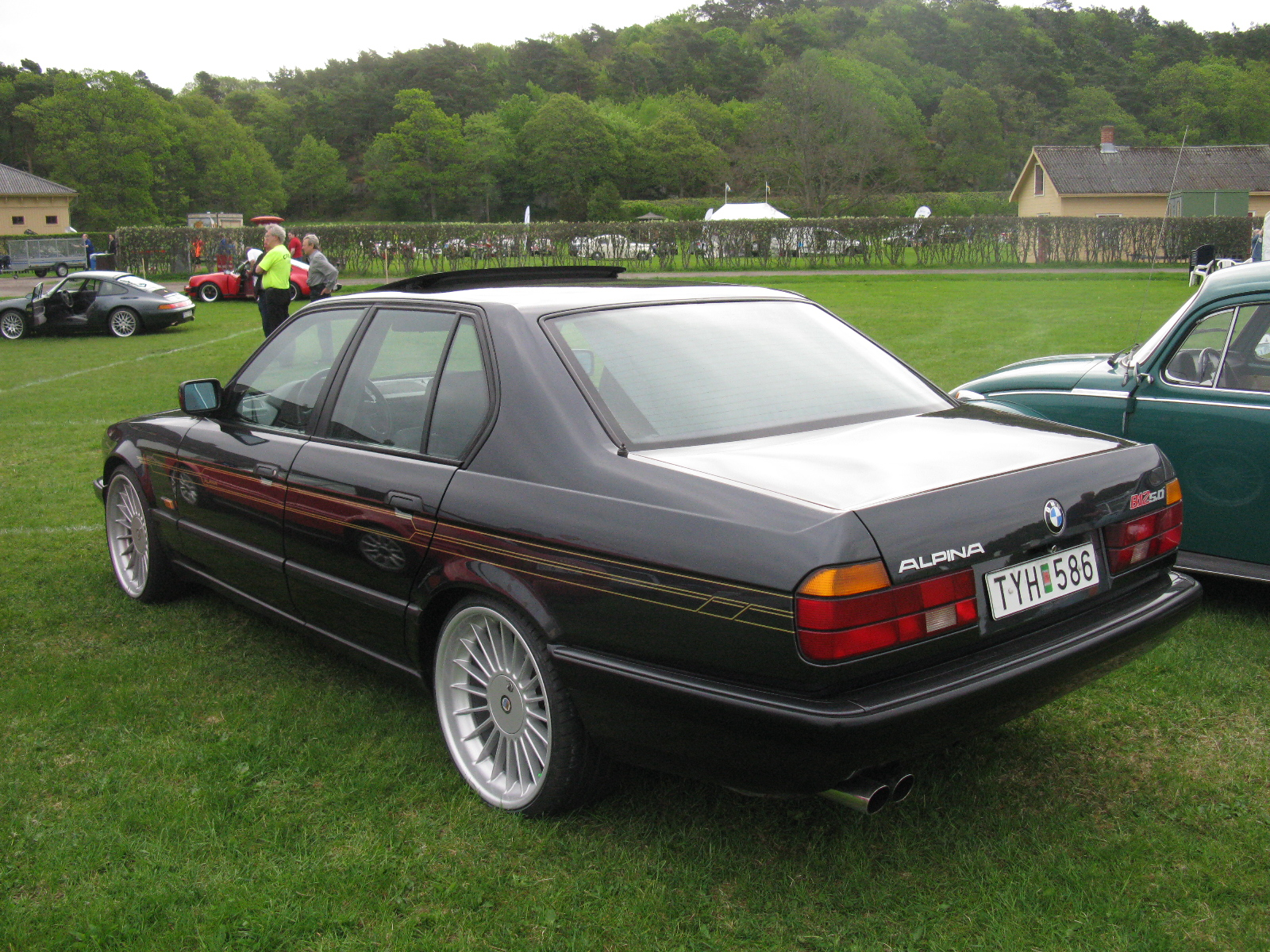
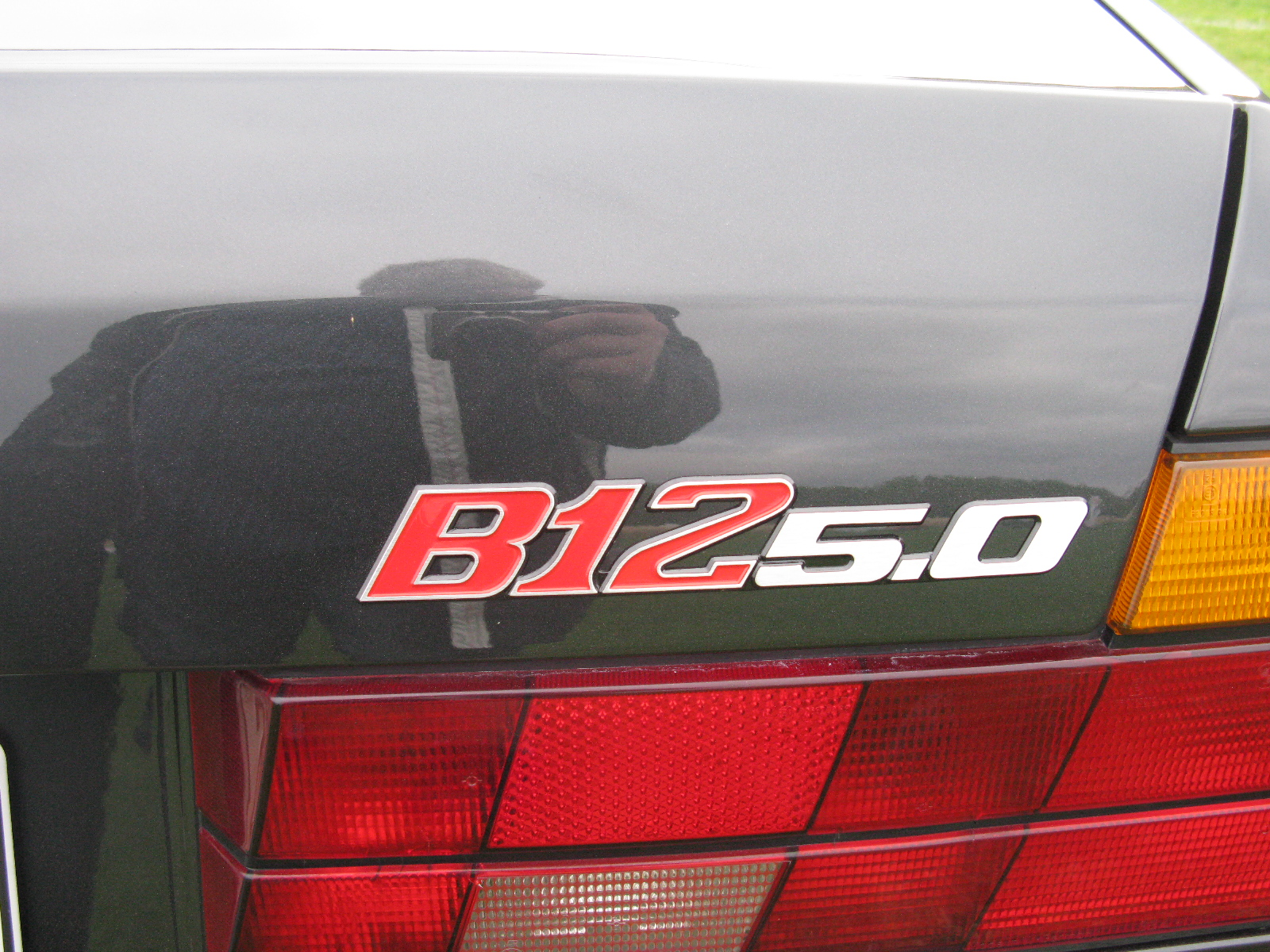
Alpina B12 5.0 (E32)

== B12 5.0 and 5.7 (E31) ==
B12 5.0
Alpina introduced a grand touring alternative of the B12 5.0 in 1990, based on the E31 8 Series' 850i and the later 850Ci models. It was introduced a few months after the introduction of the 850i.

Notable mechanical changes include higher compression Mahle pistons fitted to the engine, along with larger intake valves, modified cylinder heads, a new exhaust system, and a modified Bosch Motronic ECU. These modifications allowed the engine to have a power output of 257 kW (350 hp) at 5,300 rpm and 470 N⋅m (347 lb⋅ft) of torque at 4,000 rpm. The engine's red-line was increased to 6,400 rpm. The B12 5.0 was only available with a 4-speed ZF 4HP24E automatic transmission. The transmission was modified electronically for improved gear changes. Other mechanical modifications consisted of new springs and Bilstein shock absorbers.

On the exterior, the car was fitted with Alpina 17-inch multi-spoke alloy wheels and a front spoiler with special paint choices along with optional Alpina pinstriping. The interior was customised to the customer specifications and contained a wide range of options, with an Alpina instrument cluster and badging being standard. The cars had special Vehicle Identification Numbers for easier recognition.

Performance figures include a claimed 0-97 km/h (60 mph) acceleration time of 6.4 seconds, 0-100 km/h (62 mph) acceleration time of 6.8 seconds and a top speed of 280 km/h (174 mph). Only 97 cars were made before the B12 5.0 was succeeded by the B12 5.7 in 1994.

B12 5.7
The B12 5.7 was originally based on the newly introduced 850CSi. It was introduced to the public in November 1992. The B12 5.7 used the new BMW S70B56 V12 engine with capacity enlarged to 5.7-litres, a modified air intake, camshafts, and a modified crankshaft. The exhaust system used was Alpina designed with stainless steel catalytic converters and the Bosch Motronic engine management system was modified. The engine has a power output of 306 kW (416 hp) and 570 N⋅m (420 lb⋅ft) of torque.

The engine is mated to a 6-speed manual transmission made by Getrag. However, an electronic clutch system called Shift-Tronic by the manufacturer was optional. The system was developed in collaboration with LUK GS and the B12 5.7 was the only Alpina model to be offered with that system. 32 cars were equipped with the Shift-Tronic system and had "Shift-Tronic" badging at the rear in addition to the regular badging.

Exterior changes are nominal and similar to the 850CSi. However, a unique carbon fibre bonnet with vents for engine cooling and a central NACA duct was fitted to the car. The interior had anthracite leather upholstery with blue contrast stitching along with an Alpina instrument cluster, wood trim, and a wooden gear knob as standard, but was customisable according to the customer specifications.

Performance figures include a 0-100 km/h (62 mph) acceleration time of 5.8 seconds and a claimed top speed of 300 km/h (186 mph). Production of the B12 5.7 amounted to 57 units, with the last example built in November 1996.

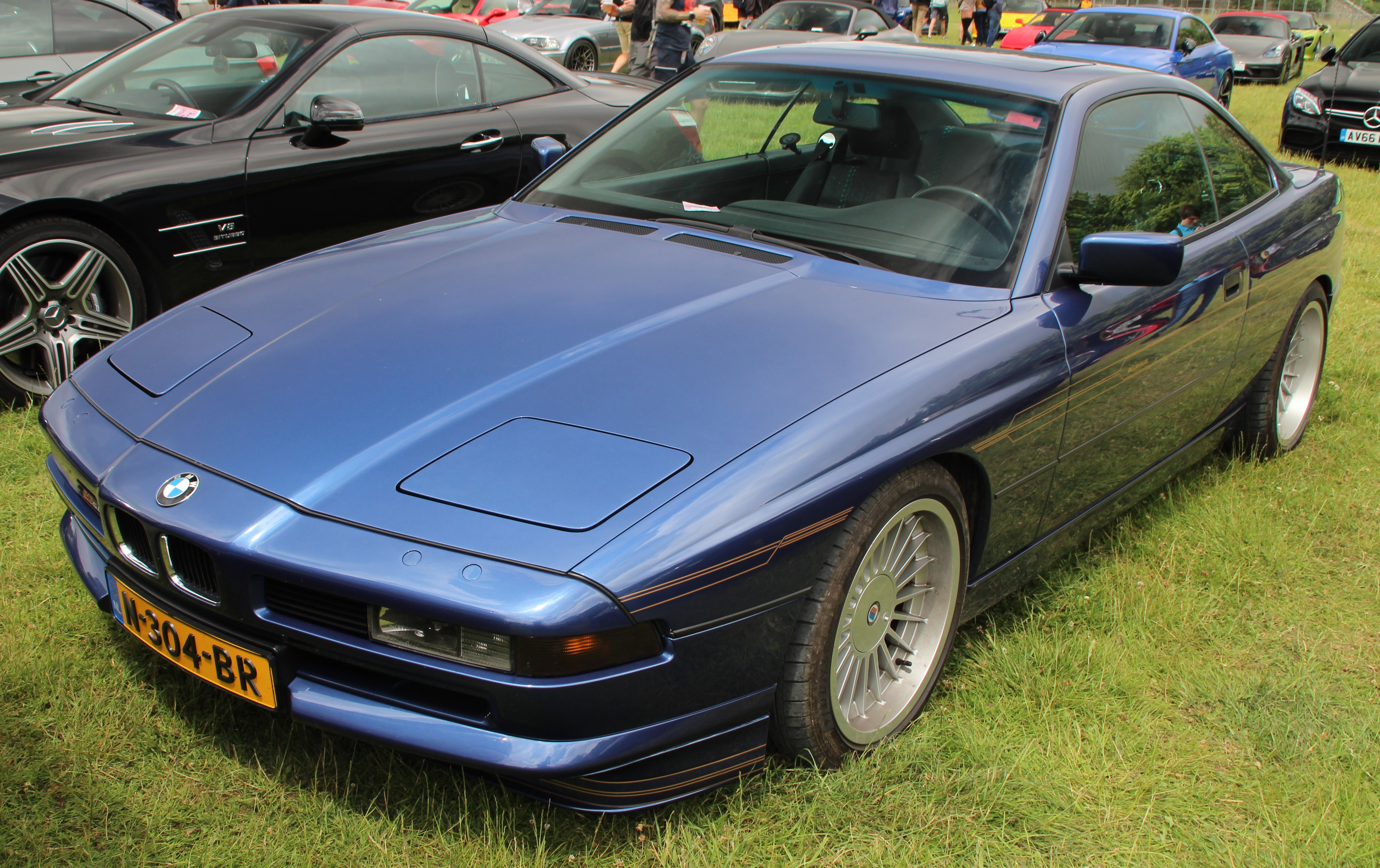

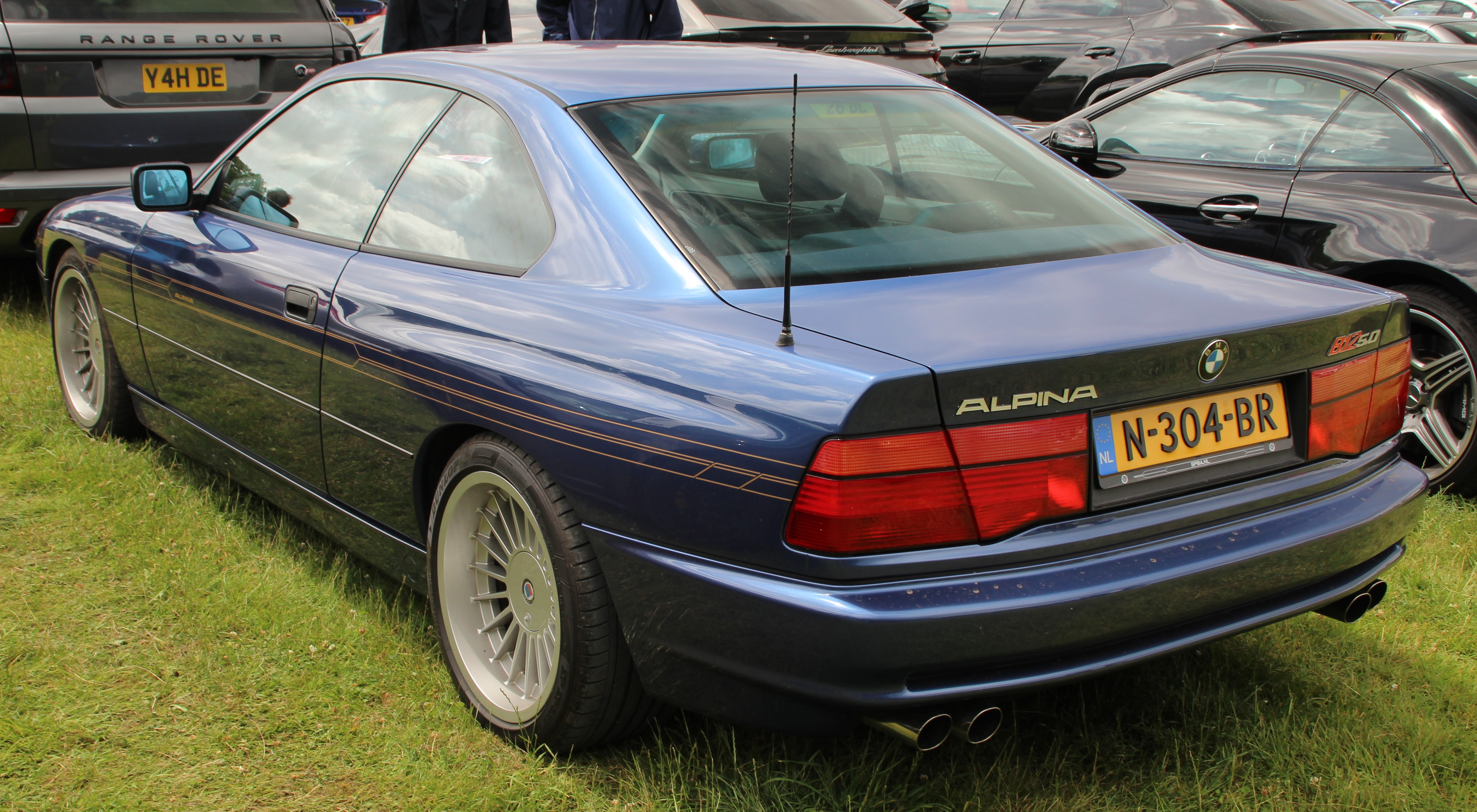
B12 5.0 (E31)

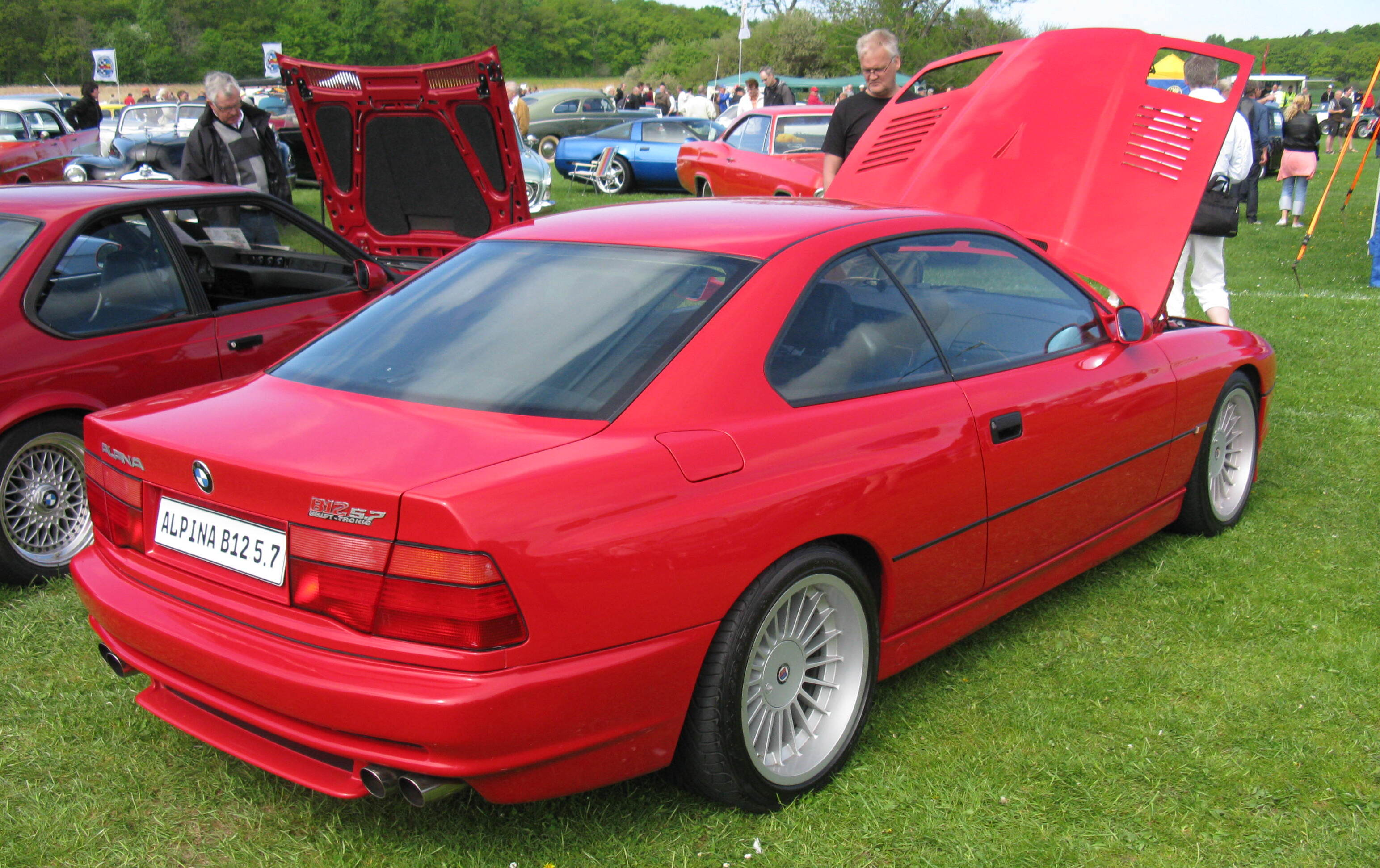
B12 5.7 (E31)

== B12 5.7 and 6.0 E-KAT (E38) ==
B12 5.7
The B12 5.7 was introduced in 1995 and was based on the new BMW 7 Series (E38). Using the 750i/iL as the base, the B12 uses a modified version of the newly introduced BMW M73 V12 engine. The modifications included the engine displacement enlarged to 5.7 litres, a modified air intake system, new cylinder heads, and higher compression Mahle pistons. These modifications allowed the engine to have a power output of 285 kW (387 PS; 382 hp) and 560 N⋅m (413 lb⋅ft) of torque. The engine was mated to a 5-speed ZF automatic transmission featuring a new gear change system called the "Switch-Tronic" system by the manufacturer. The system allowed the driver to put the car in a manual shift mode in which gears were changed via buttons on the back of the steering wheel.

Exterior changes include a front chin spoiler with Alpina lettering, 20-inch multi-spoke alloy wheels, "B12 5.7 Switch-Tronic" badging, choice of new colours and optional Alpina pinstriping. Later cars had "B12 E-KAT" badging at the rear emphasising the use of an electronically heated metal catalyst in the catalytic converter of the car which reduced emissions.

The interior had anthracite leather with contrast stitching as standard equipment along with wood trim and an Alpina instrument cluster. It was customisable according to the customer specifications. The interior also had a plaque signifying the production number of the car.

Performance figures include a 0-100 km/h (62 mph) acceleration time of 6.4 seconds and a top speed of 280 km/h (174 mph). Production of the B12 5.7 continued until 1998 before it was replaced by the B12 6.0, based on the facelifted 7-Series. A total of 202 cars were made.

B12 6.0
The B12 6.0 was introduced in 1999 and was based on the facelift 750i/iL. The B12 6.0 used a modified version of the BMW M73 V12 engine. The modifications include enlarged engine displacement to 6.0 litres, higher compression Mahle aluminium pistons, modified camshafts, and air intakes, Bosch Motronic M5 2.1 fuel injection, and a new exhaust system with a catalytic converter having an electronically heated metal catalyst. These modifications allowed the engine to have a power output of 316 kW (430 PS; 424 hp) and 600 N⋅m (443 lb⋅ft) of torque making it the largest and most powerful naturally aspirated engine ever made by the manufacturer. The transmission was the same ZF 5-speed Switch Tronic as used in the B12 5.7.

Exterior and interior modifications remained the same as the B12 5.7 but the B12 6.0 used wider tyres having sizes of 245/40ZR20 tyres at the front and 275/35ZR20 at the rear.

Performance figures include a 0-100 km/h (62 mph) acceleration time of 5.9 seconds, a standing kilometre time of 23.5 seconds and a top speed of 291 km/h (181 mph). Production of the B12 6.0 continued until 2001, and a total of 94 cars were made.

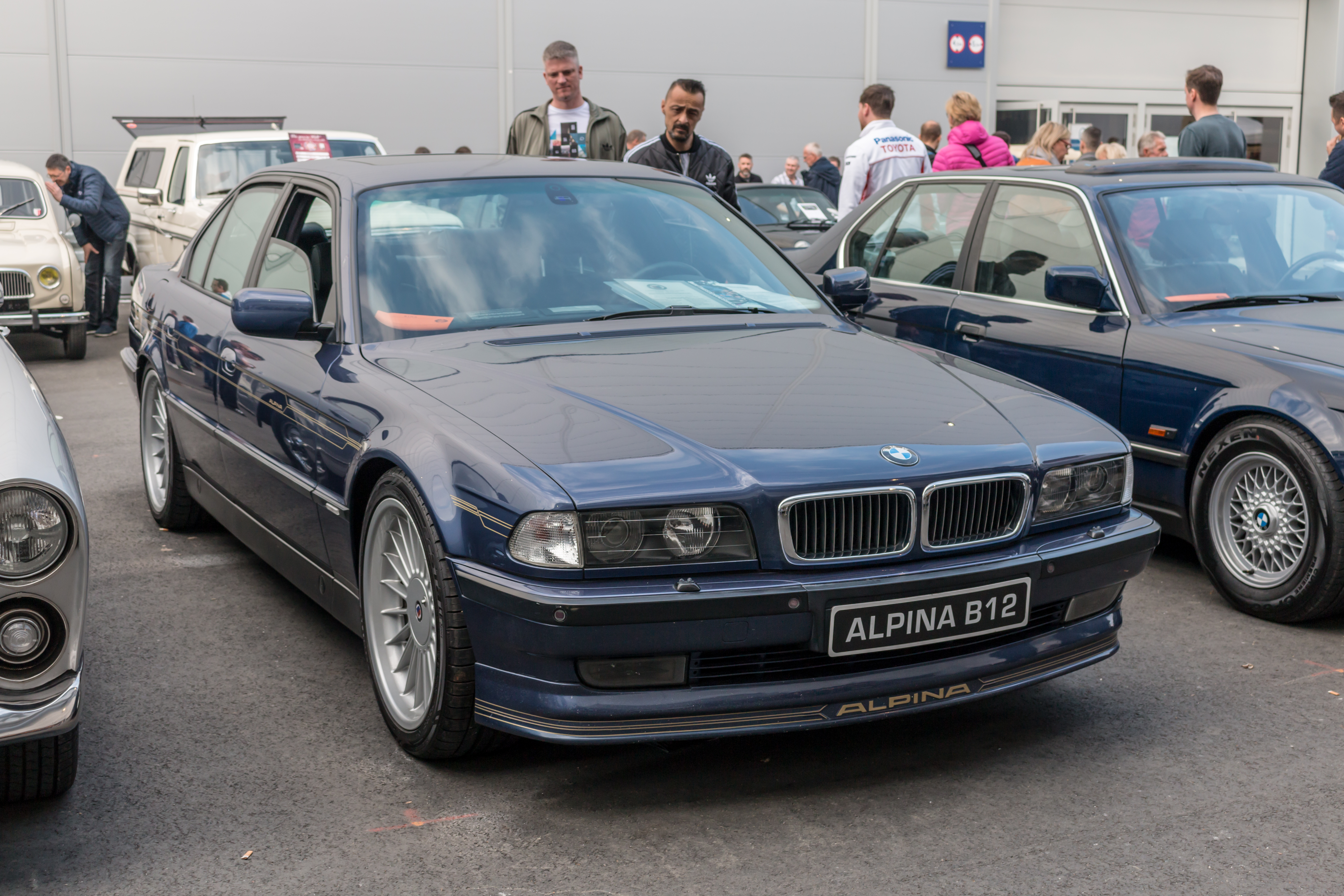

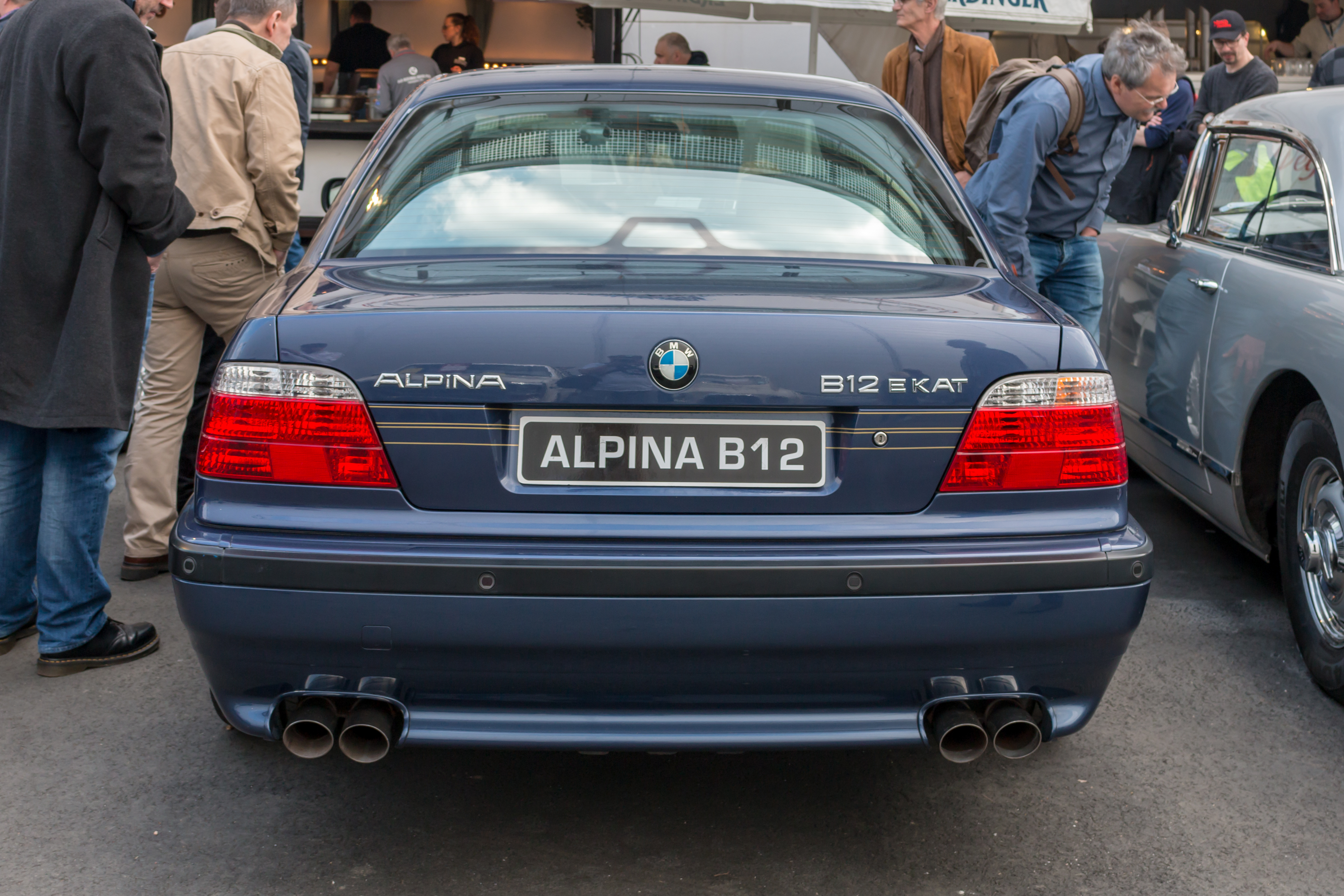
B12 5.7 E-KAT (E38)

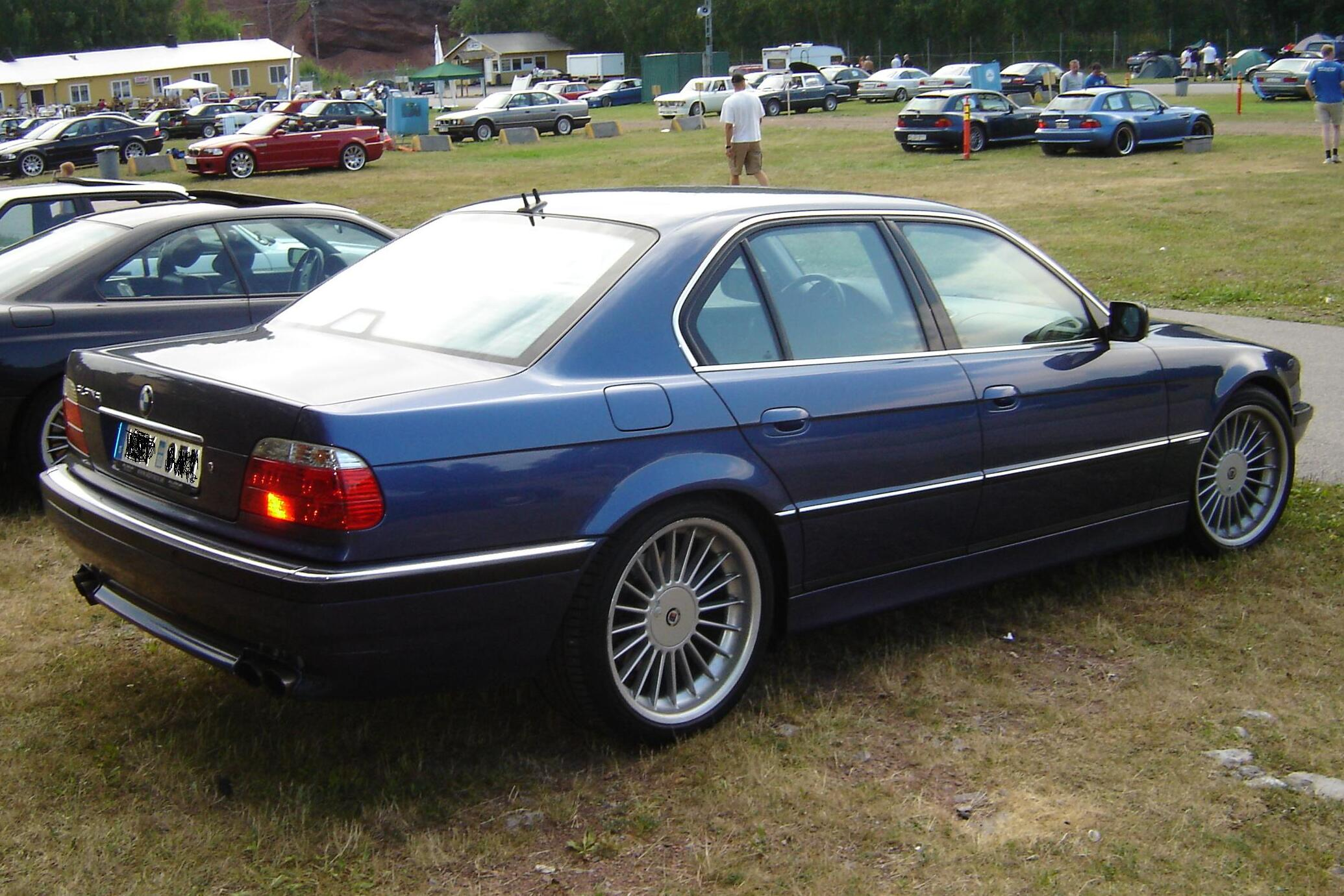
B12 6.0 E-KAT (E38)
