= BMW 7 Series (E38) =

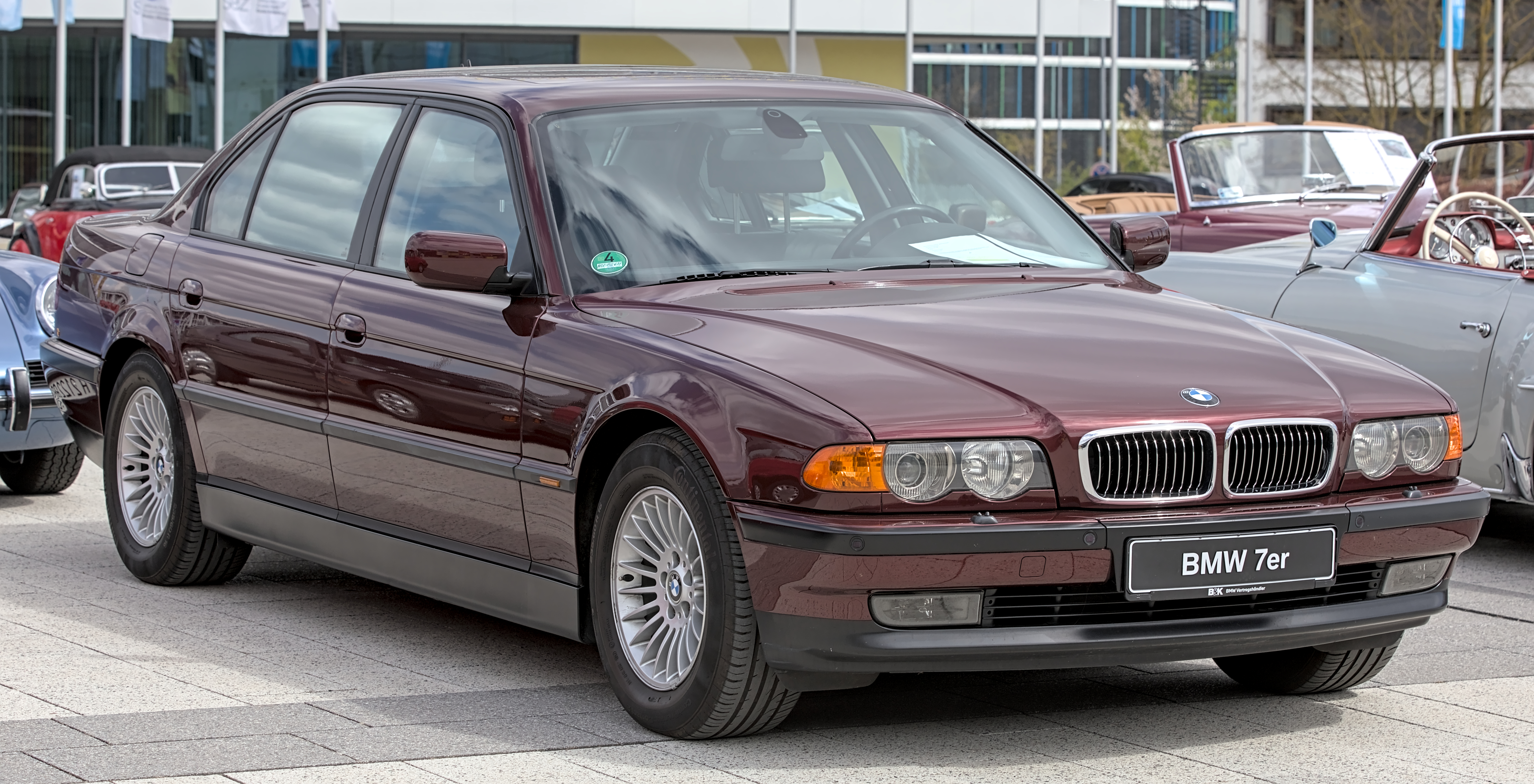

Overview
- Manufacturer: BMW
- Production: April 1994 – July 2001
- Model years: 1995–2001
- Assembly: Germany: Dingolfing (BMW Group Plant Dingolfing)
- Designer: Boyke Boyer

Body and chassis
- Class: Full-size luxury car (F)
- Body style: 4-door sedan
- Layout: Rear-wheel drive
- Related: Alpina B12 (E38)

Powertrain
- Engine: Petrol: 2.8 L M52B28/M52TÜB28 I6; 3.0 L M60B30 V8; 3.5 L M62B35 V8; 4.0 L M60B40 V8; 4.4 L M62B44 V8; 5.4 L M73B54 V12; Turbodiesel: 2.5-2.9 L M51/M57 I6; 3.9 L M67 V8
- Transmission: 5-speed manual; 6-speed manual; 5-speed ZF 5HP automatic

Dimensions
- Wheelbase: SWB: 2,930 mm (115.4 in); LWB: 3,070 mm (120.9 in)
- Length: SWB: 4,985 mm (196.3 in); LWB: 5,124 mm (201.7 in)
- Width: 1,862 mm (73.3 in)
- Height: 1,425–1,435 mm (56.1–56.5 in)
- Curb weight: 1,710–2,085 kg (3,770–4,597 lb)

Chronology
- Predecessor: BMW 7 Series (E32)
- Successor: BMW 7 Series (E65)

The BMW E38 is the third generation of the BMW 7 Series luxury cars and was produced from 1994 until 2001. The E38 replaced the E32 7 Series and was produced with petrol and turbo-diesel straight-six and V8 engines, along with a petrol V12 flagship model. Three wheelbase lengths were available — short (i), long (iL) and Limousine (L7).

The E38 was the first car available with curtain airbags. It was also the first European car to offer satellite navigation and the first BMW to offer an in-built television. The E38 was the first 7 Series to be available with a diesel engine and the last to be available with a manual transmission.

In 2001, the E38 was succeeded by the E65 7 Series.

== Development ==
In early 1988, development began on the third generation of the 7 Series. From 1988 to 1990 styling work was done initially under design director Claus Luthe (through April 1990, taken over by Dr. Wolfgang Reitzle), when Boyke Boyer's concept design was chosen and further refined into production form.

In February 1991, the final production design for the new 7 Series was approved by the board 36 months ahead of the scheduled start of production for 17 February 1994. On 27 April 1993, German design patents were filed featuring a pre-production prototype as a design representation. Patents were later filed on 27 October 1993 in the United States.

== Production ==
Production started on 23 July 1993 for pilot production models; US specification variants entered pre-series production on 13 January 1994. Series production of the 730i and 740i commenced in April 1994 for the June 1994 domestic German launch. US-specification cars entered production in September 1994, for their November 1994 launch. On 18 February 1994, the E38 BMW 7 Series was unveiled for the 1995 model year via a BMW press release. 750i production began in November 1994, in advance of its January 1995 launch.

The production totals by model are: 728i- 38,000; 728iL- 7,000; 730i- 21,000; 730iL- 2,000; 735i- 21,000; 735iL- 5,000; 740i- 88,000; 740iL- 81,000; 750i- 8,000; 750iL- 15,000; 725tds- 9,000; 730d- 12,000, 740d- 3,000 and less than 500 each for the 740iL P, 750iL P, 750iL S and L7 models.

A total of 340,242 cars were produced. The last E38 rolled off BMW's assembly line on 27 July 2001 to make way for the replacement E65 7 Series.

== Engines ==
=== Petrol engines ===
Model	Engine	Power	Torque	Years
728i, 728iL	2.8 L M52B28 straight-6	142 kW (193 hp)	280 N⋅m (207 lb⋅ft)	1995–1998
728i, 728iL	2.8 L M52TÜB28 straight-6	142 kW (193 hp) (Note: Peak power now produced at 5500 rpm rather than 5300 rpm)	280 N⋅m (207 lb⋅ft) (Note: Peak torque now produced at 3500 rpm rather than 3950 rpm)	1998–2001
730i, 730iL	3.0 L M60B30; V8	160 kW (218 hp)	290 N⋅m (214 lb⋅ft)	1994–1996
735i, 735iL	3.5 L M62B35; V8	173 kW (235 hp)	320 N⋅m (236 lb⋅ft)	1996–1998
735i, 735iL	3.5 L M62TÜB35; V8	175 kW (238 hp)	345 N⋅m (254 lb⋅ft)	1998–2001
740i, 740iL	4.0 L M60B40; V8	210 kW (286 hp)	400 N⋅m (295 lb⋅ft)	1994–1996
740i, 740iL	4.4 L M62B44; V8	210 kW (286 hp)	420 N⋅m (310 lb⋅ft)	1996–1998
740i, 740iL	4.4 L M62TÜB44; V8	210 kW (286 hp)	440 N⋅m (325 lb⋅ft)	1998–2001
750i, 750iL	5.4 L M73B54; V12	240 kW (326 hp)	490 N⋅m (361 lb⋅ft)	1995–1998
750i, 750iL	5.4 L M73TÜB54; V12	240 kW (326 hp)	490 N⋅m (361 lb⋅ft)	1998–2001

=== Diesel engines ===
Model	Years	Engine- turbo	Power	Torque
725tds	1996–2001	2.5 L M51D25 straight-6	105 kW (143 hp)	280 N⋅m (207 lb⋅ft)
730d	1998–2001	2.9 L M57D30 straight-6	142 kW (193 hp)	410 N⋅m (302 lb⋅ft)
740d	1999–2001	3.9 L M67D40; V8	180 kW (245 hp)	560 N⋅m (413 lb⋅ft)

== Transmissions ==
A 5-speed ZF 5HP automatic transmission was available on all models. In many markets, a 5-speed manual transmission was available for the 725tds, 728i, 730i, and 735i, while a 6-speed manual was on offer for the 740i.

== Equipment ==
Safety features include ASC+T traction control, Dynamic Stability Control (DSC), headlight washers and auto-leveling low beam xenon HID headlamps. Side tubular airbags (called "Head Protection System") were fitted as standard equipment. "Active Comfort Seats" were introduced in 1998, to improve comfort and reduce fatigue for the driver and front passenger. This system uses two fluid-filled bladders which alternate in height.

Other equipment includes Electronic Damper Control (called EDC III), Park Distance Control (PDC), auto-dimming & power folding mirrors, power moonroof, power rear sunblind, rain-sensing wipers, dual-zone or tri-zone climate control, electric driver's seat adjustment and electric steering wheel adjustment.

Double glazed windows were available (called "dual pane glass"). Break resistant laminated "security glass" was also available, which is known to delaminate. The delamination occurred with the Protection S357A option only, not with normal S352A dual pane windows. Bullet-resistant glass was used for the Protection model, with even thicker glass used for the Security model.

The Sport Package included a revised steering wheel, suspension, exterior trim, and interior wood trim. Some sports models also included a shorter differential ratio and higher stall speed for the torque converter. This allowed for a 0–97 km/h (60 mph) acceleration time of 5.9 seconds.

== In-car electronics ==
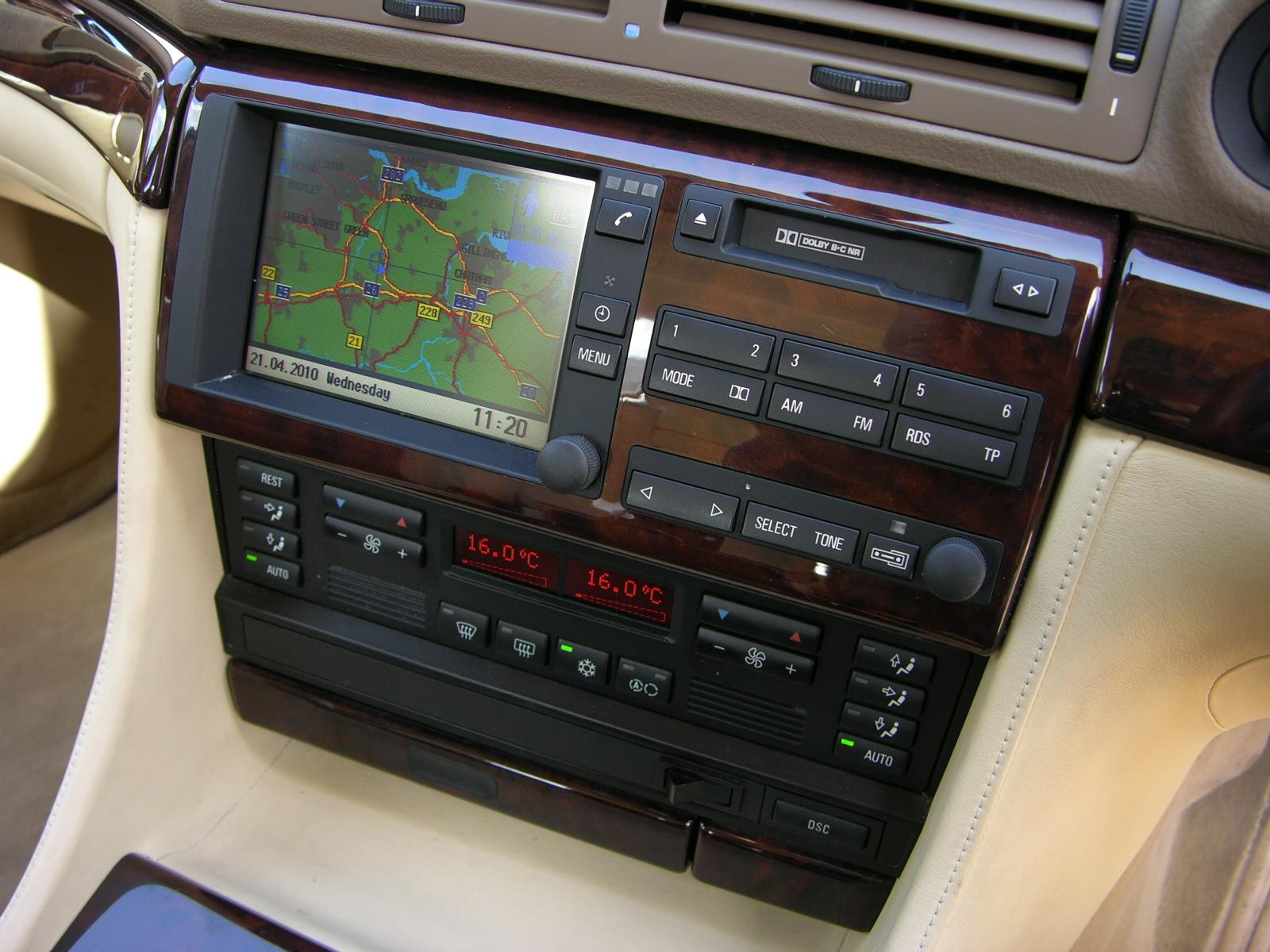
Navigation monitor

The E38 was one of the first European cars to be available with satellite navigation, a system called CARIN jointly developed by BMW and Philips.

The in-car entertainment (radio, audio system, satellite navigation, television and communications systems) are part of an automotive communication system called I-bus.

A multi-function steering wheel included controls for the audio, phone, cruise control and air recirculation.

== Special models ==
=== L7 ===
From 1997 to 2001, BMW marketed an extended wheelbase limousine model called the L7. The wheelbase was extended by 250 mm (9.8 in) over the "iL" models, resulting in an overall length of 5.37 m (211.4 in). Features included electrically adjustable rear seats, rear footrests, fold down rear trays, a fridge, rear television screen, video player and a fax machine.

Based on the 12-cylinder 750iL , the L7 has an electronically limited top speed of 250 km/h (155 mph). The L7 was only available in the Middle East, Southeast Asia and Europe, and 899 examples were built. The 2000-2001 models had an optional "privacy window" glass partition to separate the driver from the rear passengers.

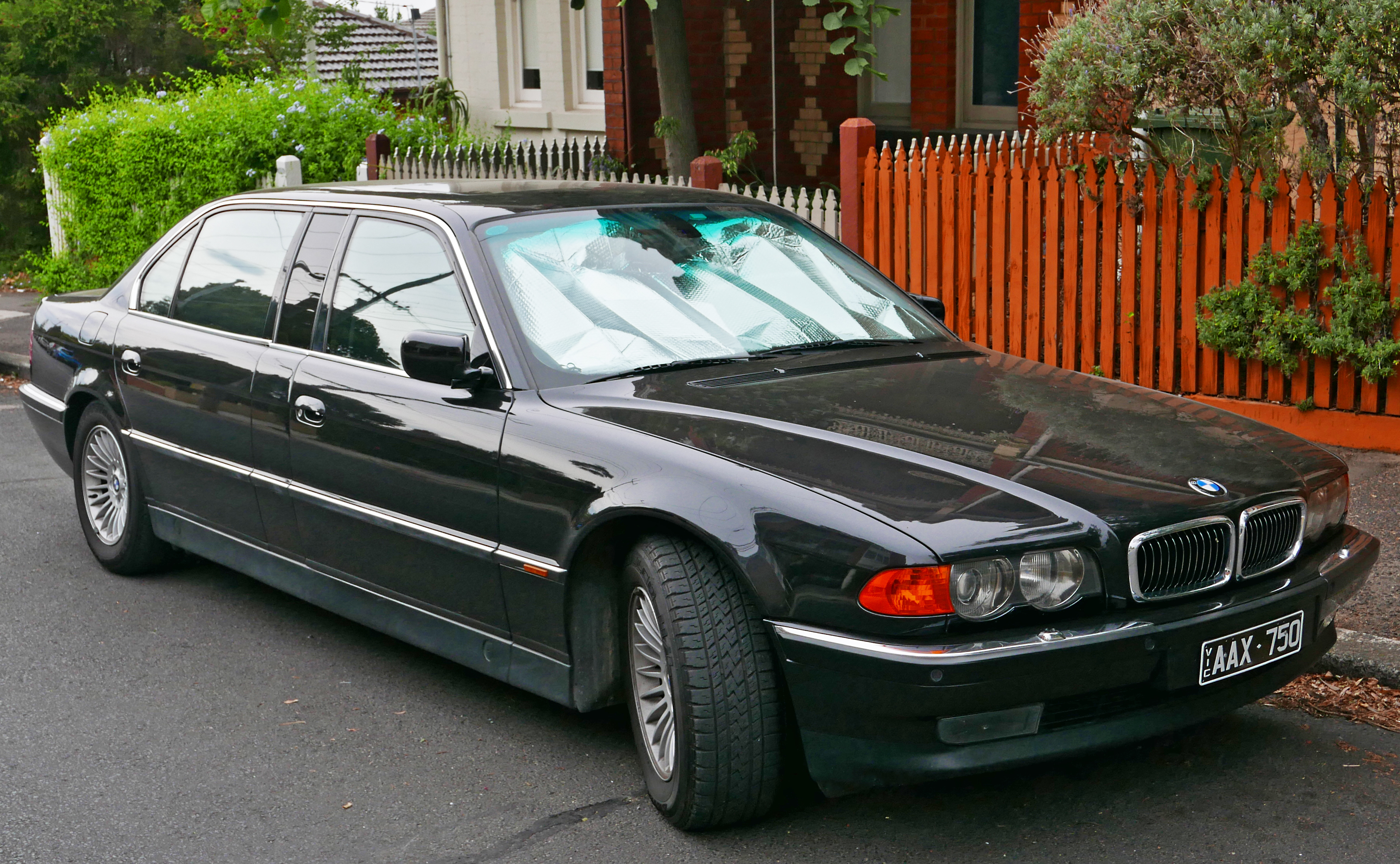
L7 front

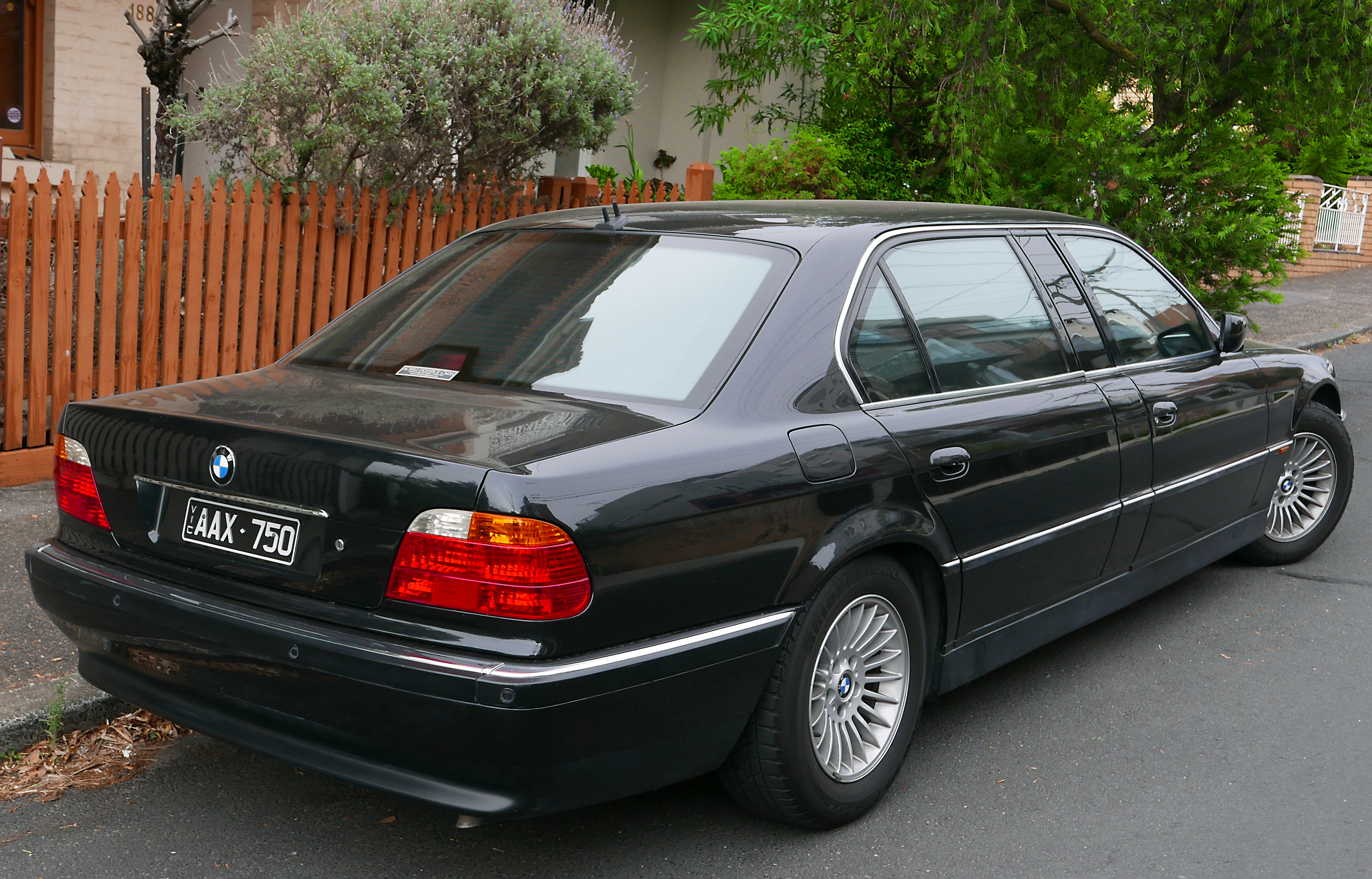
L7 rear

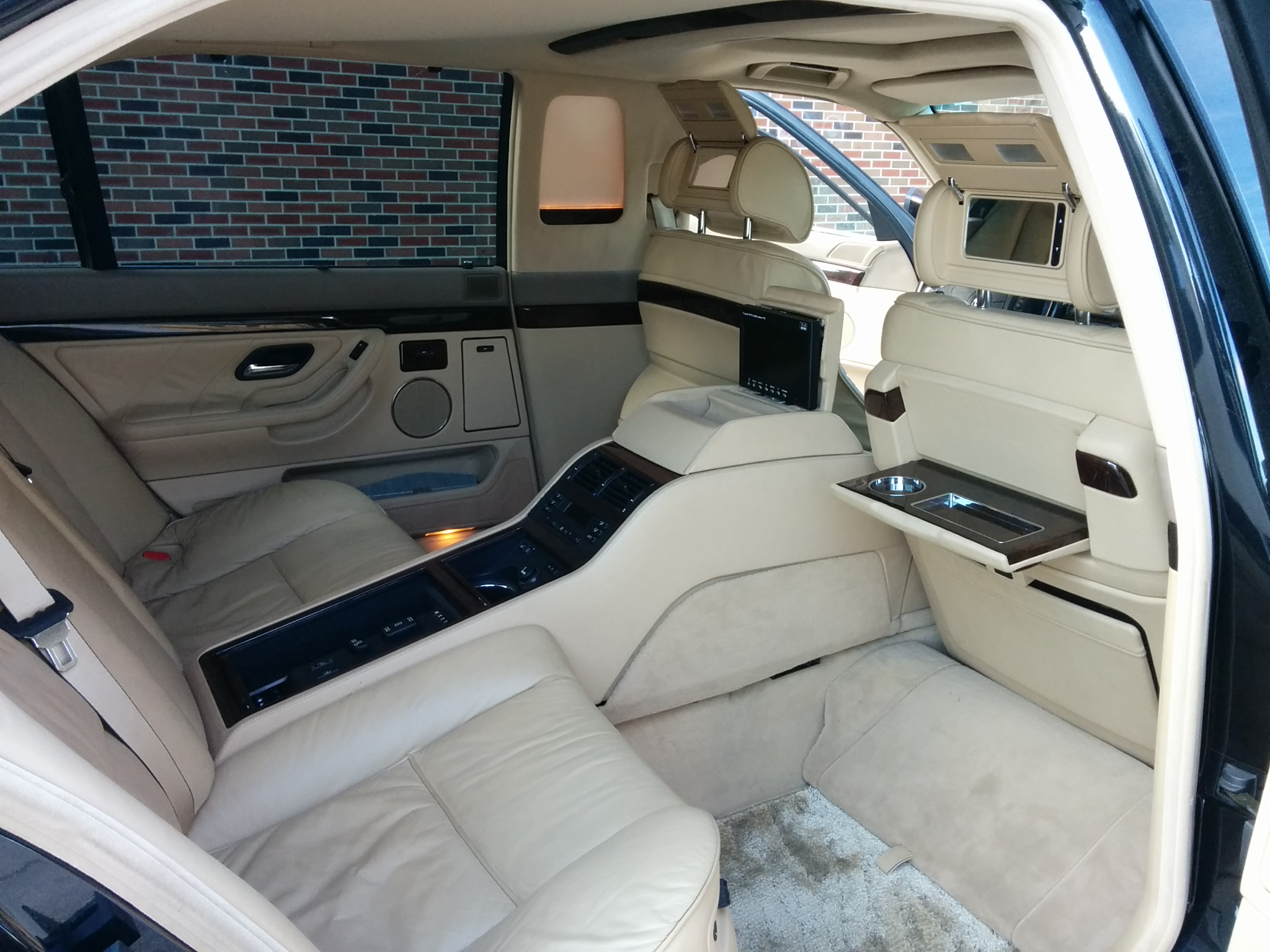
L7 interior

=== Protection line ===
The armoured "Protection Line" vehicles were built from 2000 to 2001 and were based on the 740iL and 750iL models. Security features include body armor, bullet-resistant glass, and run-flat tyres. An intercom system is provided to communicate with people outside the vehicle while the windows and doors are shut.

=== Security line ===
A High-Security version with protection up to B6/7 was also available in Europe, known internally as the 750iL S. The additional security measures brought an additional weight of 950 kg (2,094 lb) compared to the normal 750iL. Features include explosive cord around the windshield allowing removal of the windshield facilitating escape and hydraulically actuated windows. A gas sensor can detect irritants like CS gas and respond by turning the blower motor off, closing fresh air flaps and all windows. A fire suppression system is triggered by either a button or the detection of extreme temperatures in the engine bay or the vicinity of the fuel tank. A breathing air system is also available which delivers air from a cylinder in the trunk, and up to three firearms cases designed to fit a Heckler & Koch MP5K were also optionally available as well as spherical gunports in the doors.

=== 750hL ===
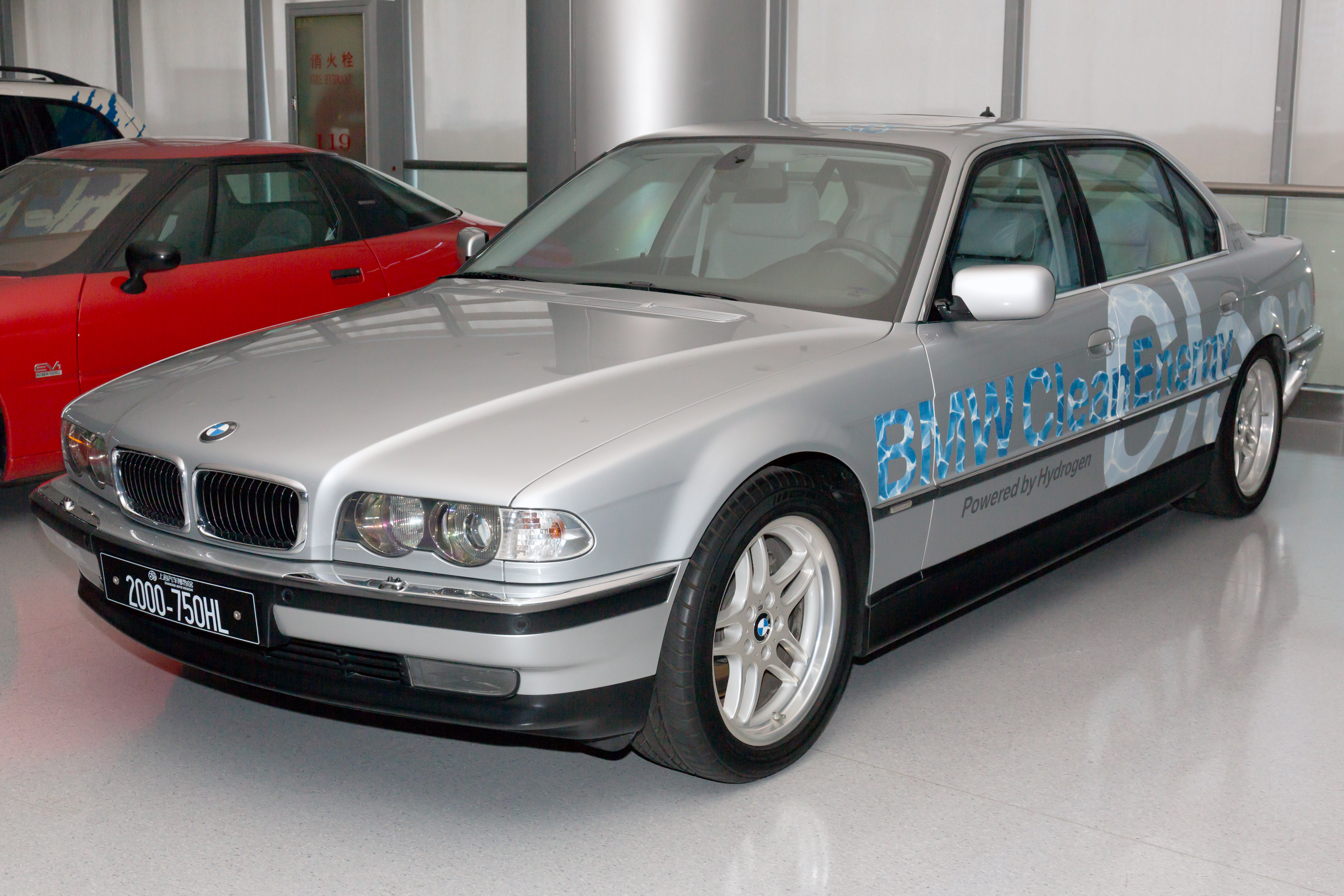
Hydrogen BMW 750hL

On 11 May 2000, BMW presented a fleet of fifteen 750hL models in Berlin. Its twelve-cylinder hydrogen combustion engine can be operated on both hydrogen and petrol. In operation on hydrogen, it delivers 150 kW (201 hp), accelerating from 0 to 100 km/h (62 mph) in 9.6 seconds and slowing the car to attain a top speed of 226 km/h (140 mph).

The production of the hydrogen engine was integrated into the regular engine production at the Dingolfing plant. It differs from the conventional petrol engine essentially only in regards to the intake tract with additional injection valves for hydrogen. The hydrogen is stored cryogenically at a temperature of minus 253 degrees Celsius in a double-walled steel tank behind the rear seat back. The hydrogen tank holds 140 litres and allows an additional range of 350 km (217 mi). In addition, the 750hL has a fuel cell rated at 5 kW (7 hp) at 42 volts. This is not used as a drive unit, but as an auxiliary power unit (APU) for power supply to the electrical system.

During the Expo 2000 in Hanover, the vehicles were used as shuttles. From February to November 2001 the vehicles were part of the "CleanEnergy WorldTour 2001" in the cities of Dubai, Brussels, Milan, Tokyo, Los Angeles, and Berlin. By November 2001 the 750hL had achieved a mileage of over 150,000 km. On the Nürburgring the 750hL recorded a time of 9 minutes and 53 seconds while powered by hydrogen.

== Alpina B12 ==
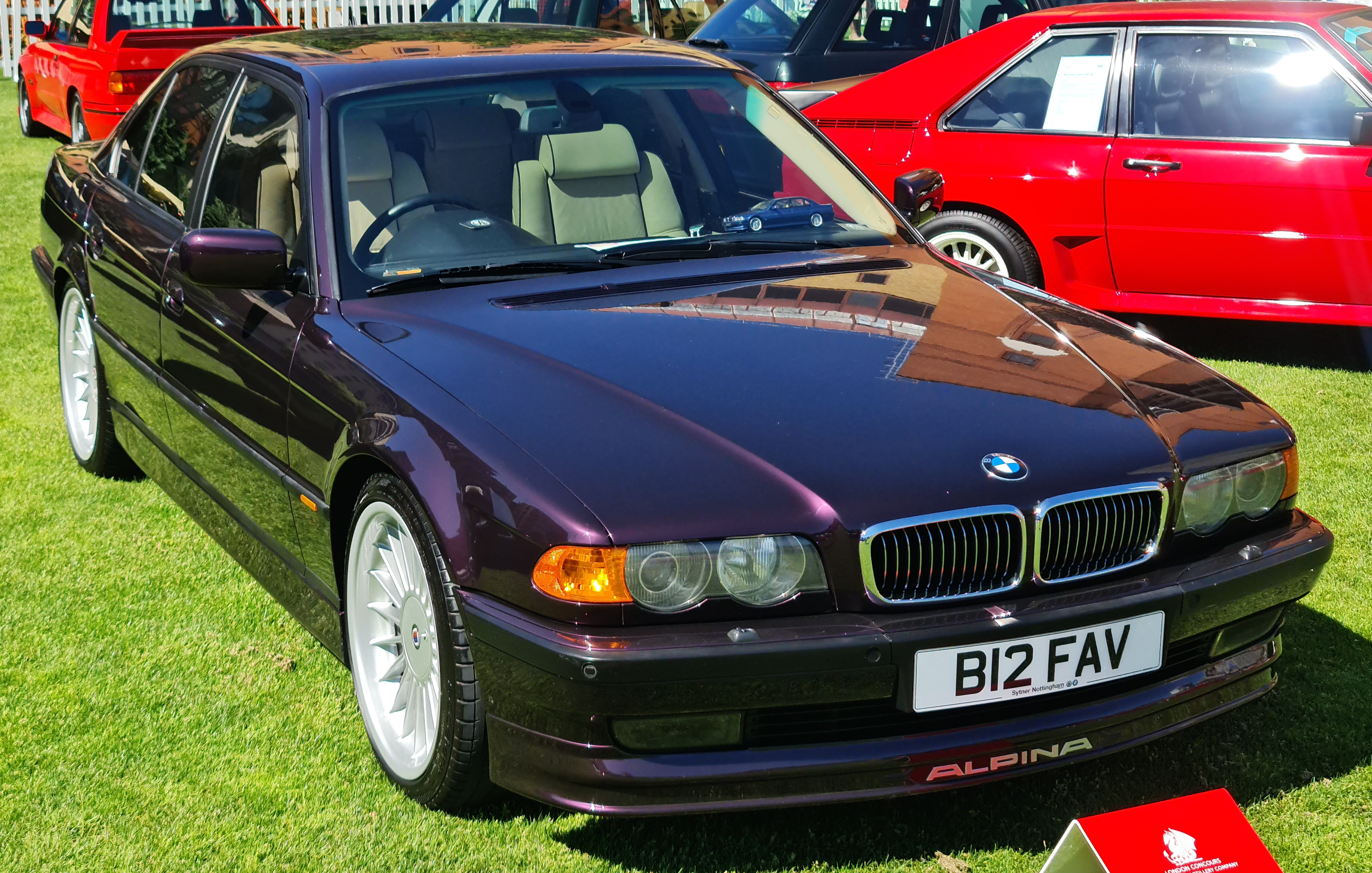
Alpina B12 6.0

The Alpina B12 5.7 and Alpina B12 6.0 models were based on the BMW 750i and 750iL respectively.

== Model year changes ==
=== 1995 ===
- E38 production begins in 1994, for the 1995 model year. Initial models were the 725tds, 730i/730iL, 740i/740iL and 750i/750iL.
- V8 models use a Nikasil bore coating, which experiences failures in countries with high sulfur petrol (see M60 article).
- DSC III (Dynamic Stability Control) becomes optional on the 740i/740iL and 750i/750iL.
- 740i/740iL models use differential ratio of 3.15, compared with 2.92 for following years.
- Standard equipment includes dual-zone climate control, electric front seats with a three-position memory for the driver's seat, front-seat side tubular airbags, a six-disc CD changer, and satellite navigation.

=== 1996 ===
- 728i and 735i models introduced.
- M62 engine replaces M60 for V8 models. The capacity on 740i and 740iL engines increases from 4.0 L to 4.4 L.
- An S-EDC electronic sports suspension, onboard TV and satellite navigation system offered as options.

=== 1997 ===
- Front passenger head airbags introduced. In late 1997, E38 7 Series and E39 5 Series became the world's first cars available with side impact head airbags. These are known as "Inflatable Tubular Structure" or "Head Protection System", and were available as optional equipment. These airbags are designed to offer head protection in side impact collisions and also maintained inflation for up to seven seconds for rollover protection.
- The 750iL (actually a re-badged 740iL) is extensively featured in the 18th James Bond film Tomorrow Never Dies starring Pierce Brosnan.

=== 1998 facelift ===
The E38 facelift (also known as Life-Cycle Impulse) models were introduced in the 1999 model year (produced from September 1998). The major changes are:

- Revised styling for headlights and taillights.
- 740d model introduced, powered by the 3.9L M67 V8 twin-turbocharged diesel engine.
- 735i and 740i engines upgraded to the "technical update" (TU) version of the M62, featuring variable valve timing on the intake camshaft (single-VANOS).
- 728i engine upgraded to the M52TÜ, featuring variable valve timing on both camshafts (double-VANOS)
- Sport Package (ZSP option code) released, including M Sport suspension, Style 37 "M Parallel" alloy wheels, Contour seats and shadowline exterior trim.
- DSCIII electronic stability control becomes standard on all 7 Series models.
- Head airbags become standard on all 7 Series models.
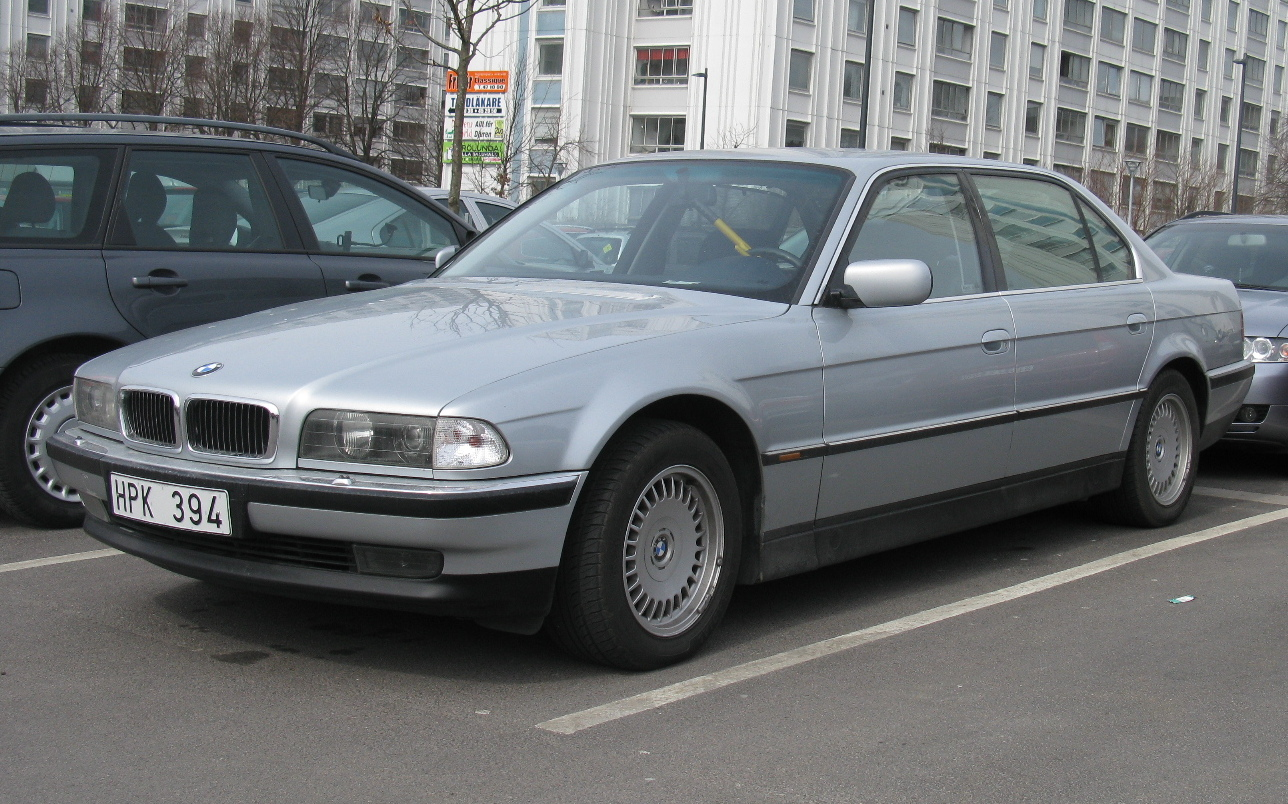
Pre-facelift front

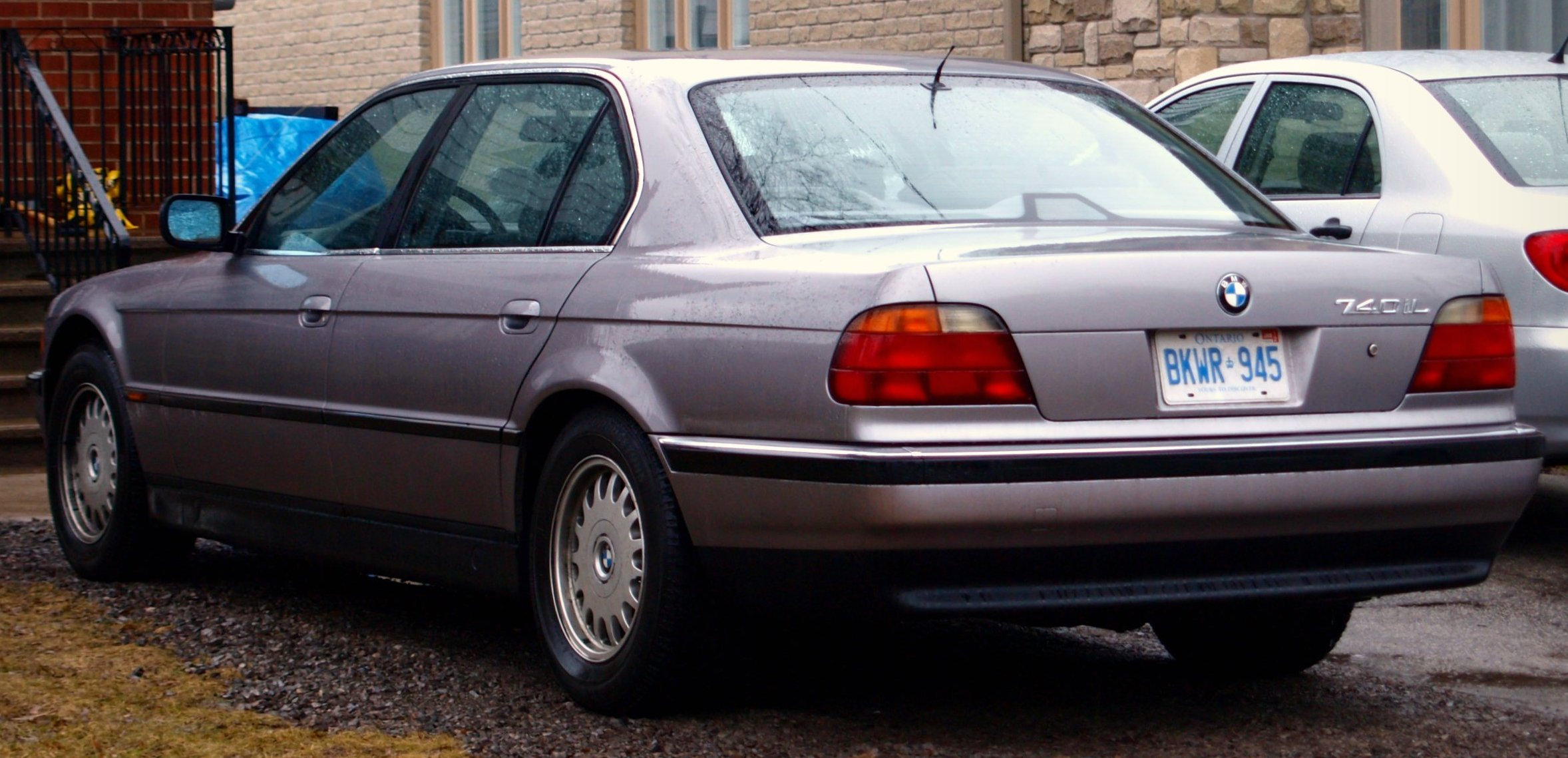
Pre-facelift rear

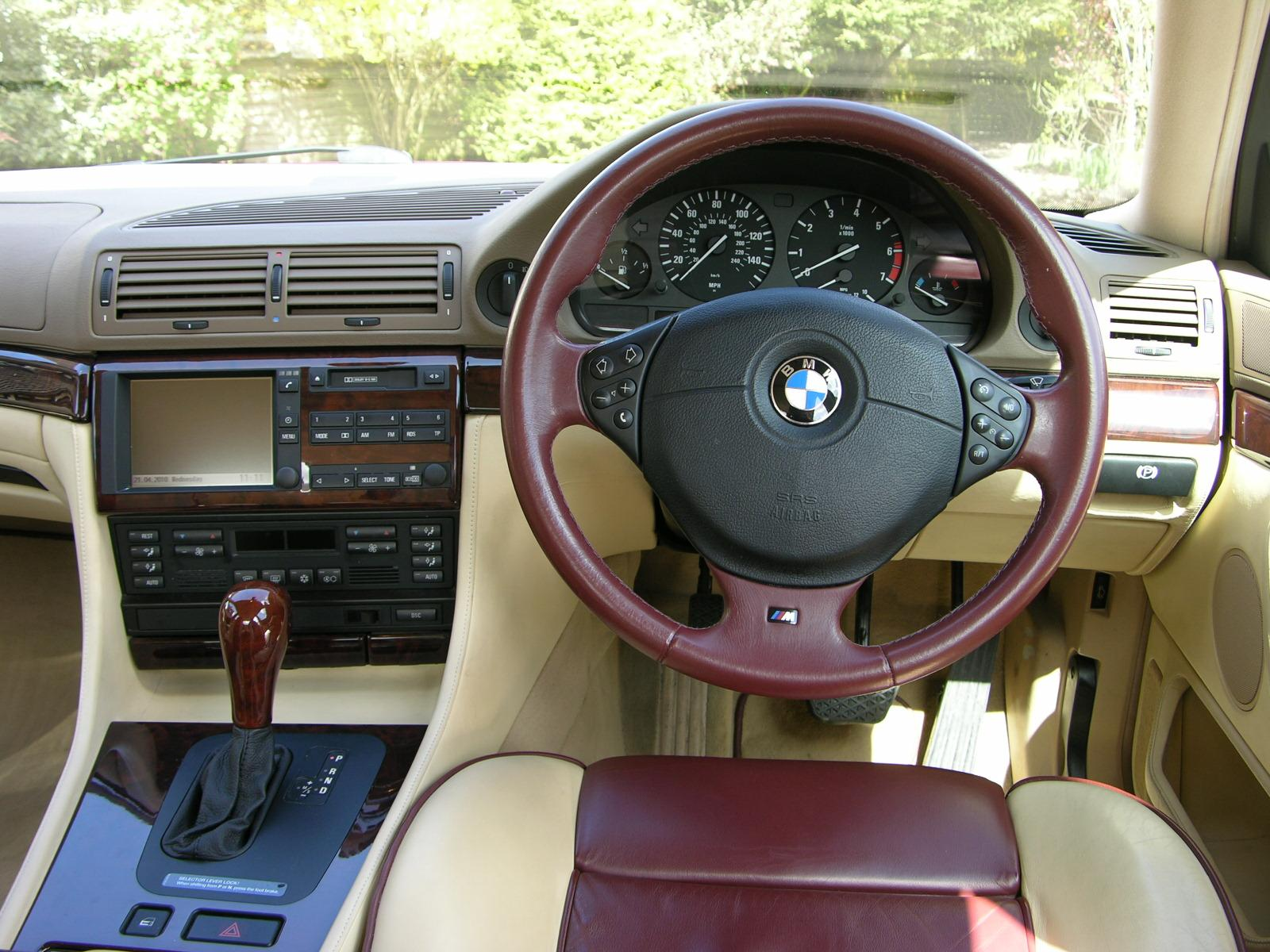
Pre-facelift interior

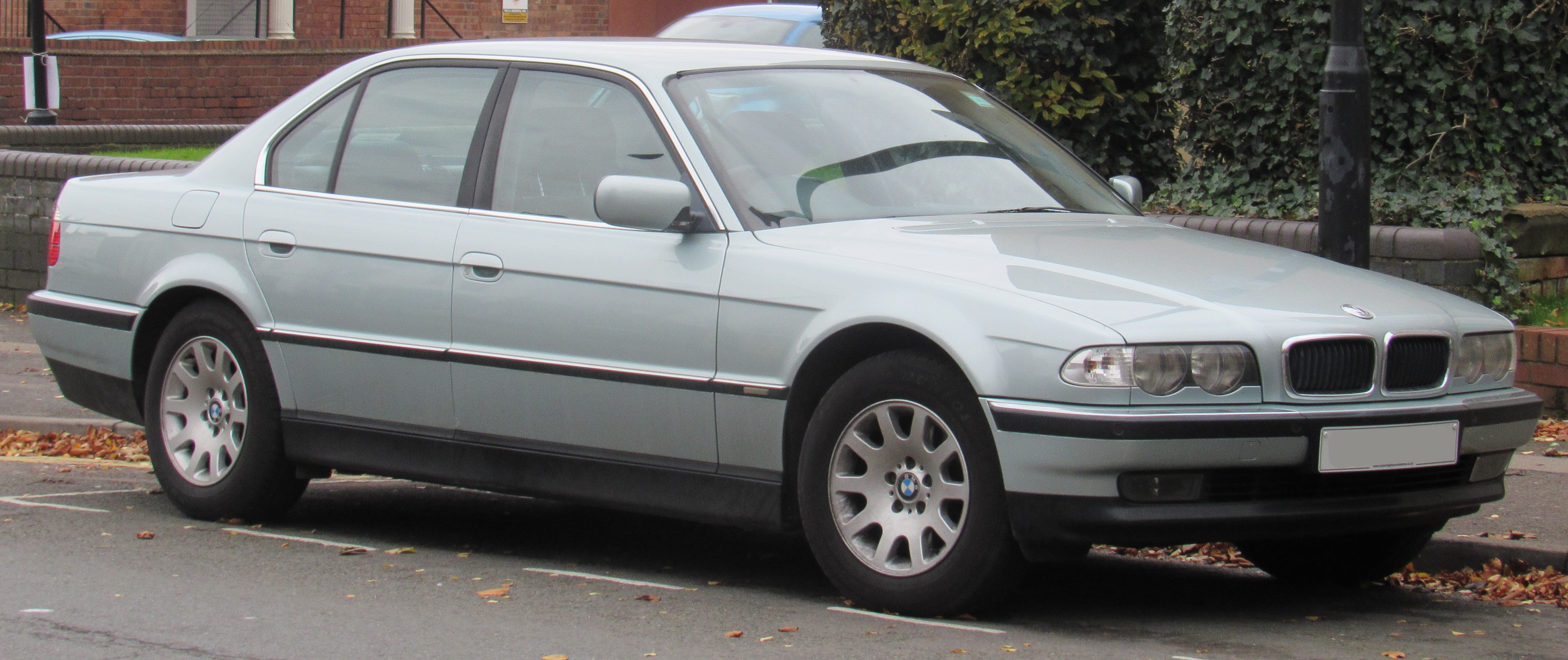
Post-facelift front

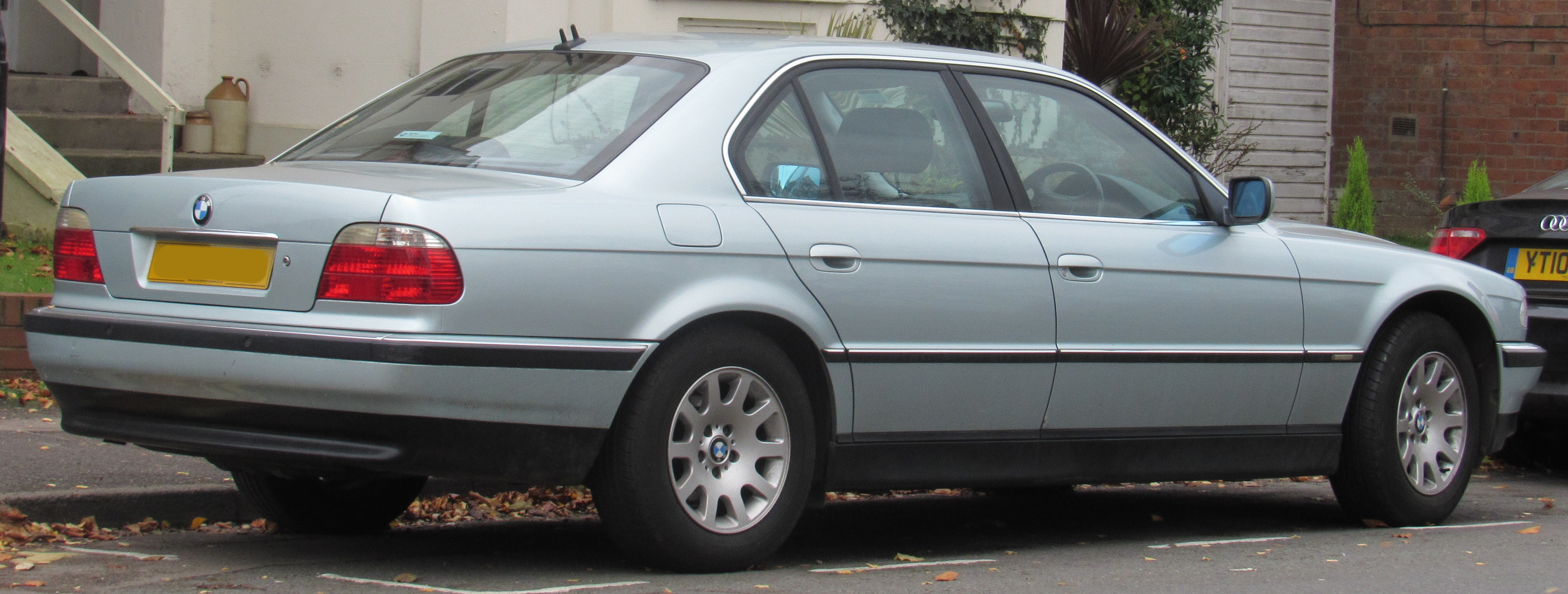
Post-facelift rear

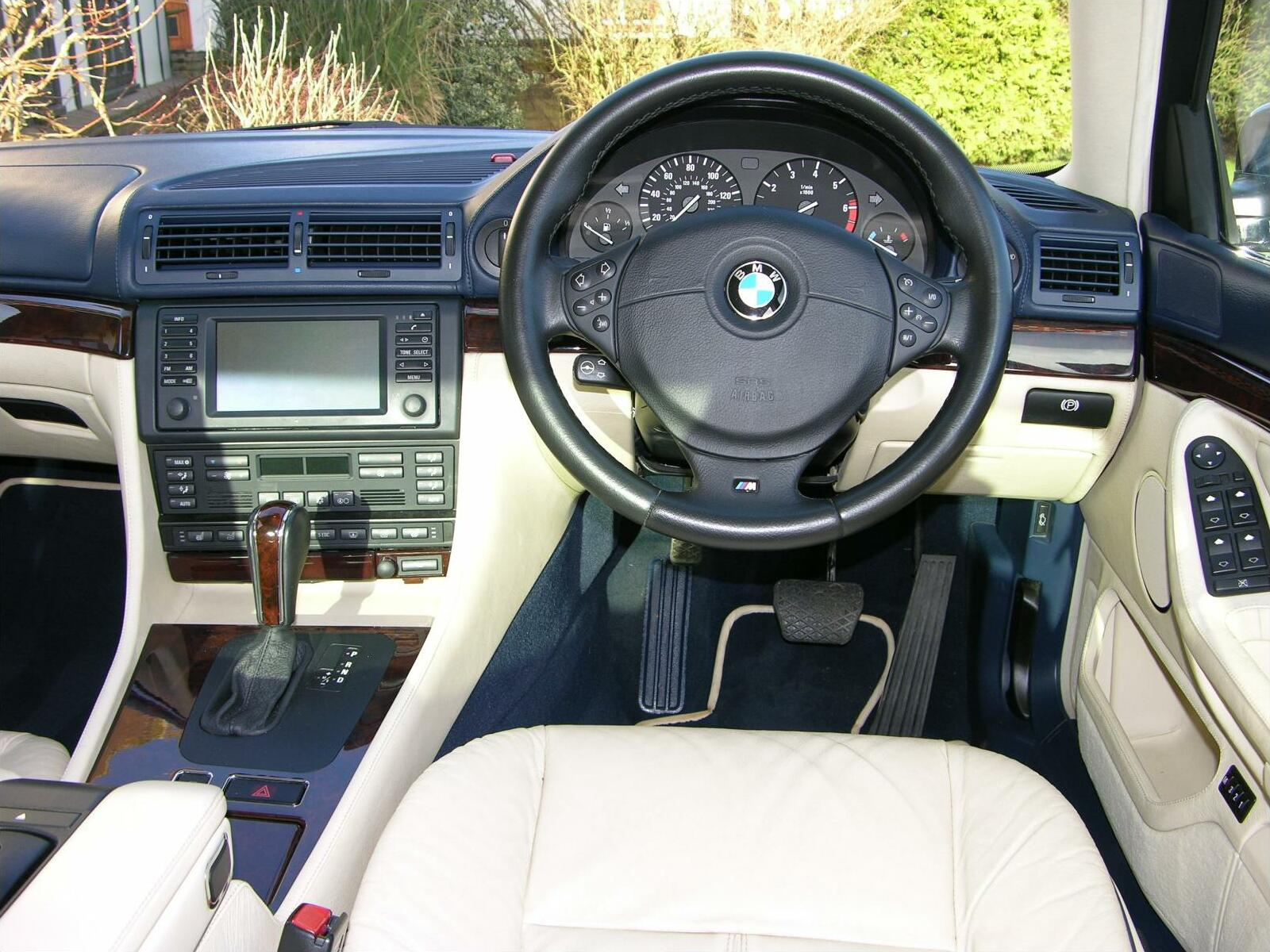
Post-facelift interior

=== 1999 ===
- The 750 now includes Electric Catalytic Converter, or "E-CAT", assemblies. Heating coils inside the catalytic converter assemblies are electrified just after engine start, bringing the catalyst up to operating temperature very quickly to qualify the vehicle for Low emission vehicle (LEV) designation. This system required the use of a two-battery system. This electric catalytic converter had been fitted since 1995 by Alpina to their B12 5,7 E-KAT saloon based on the BMW 750i, as it had been developed jointly by Emitec, Alpina and BMW.
- From March, features such as Xenon headlamps, rain-sensitive windshield wipers, headlight washers, GPS navigation, and upgraded audio became standard for US models.

=== 2000 ===
- Display for satellite navigation upgraded in September to 6.5 inch 16:9 screen.
- Navigation upgraded to MKIII in September, therefore maps for satellite navigation switch to CD format.
- A radar-based adaptive cruise control (called Active Cruise Control) became available as an option.

=== 2001 ===
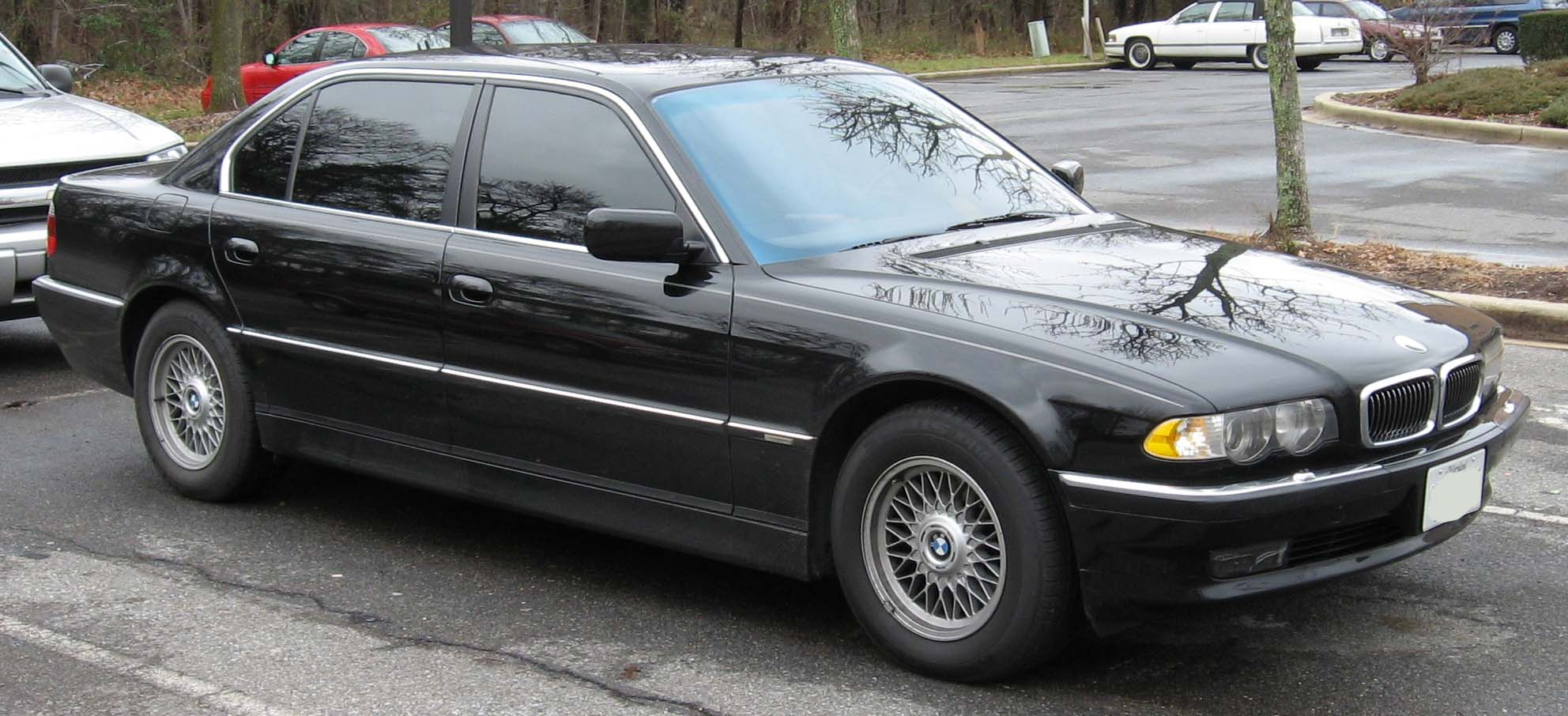
2001 BMW 7 Series (US)

- Cosmetic changes including body-colored side skirts and bumper facias (previously black), clear turn signal lenses (previously amber).
- Sport package becomes available on 750iL.
- Additional standard equipment, including a Motorola StarTAC or TimePort mobile phone, with BMW Assist telemetry system.

== In popular culture ==
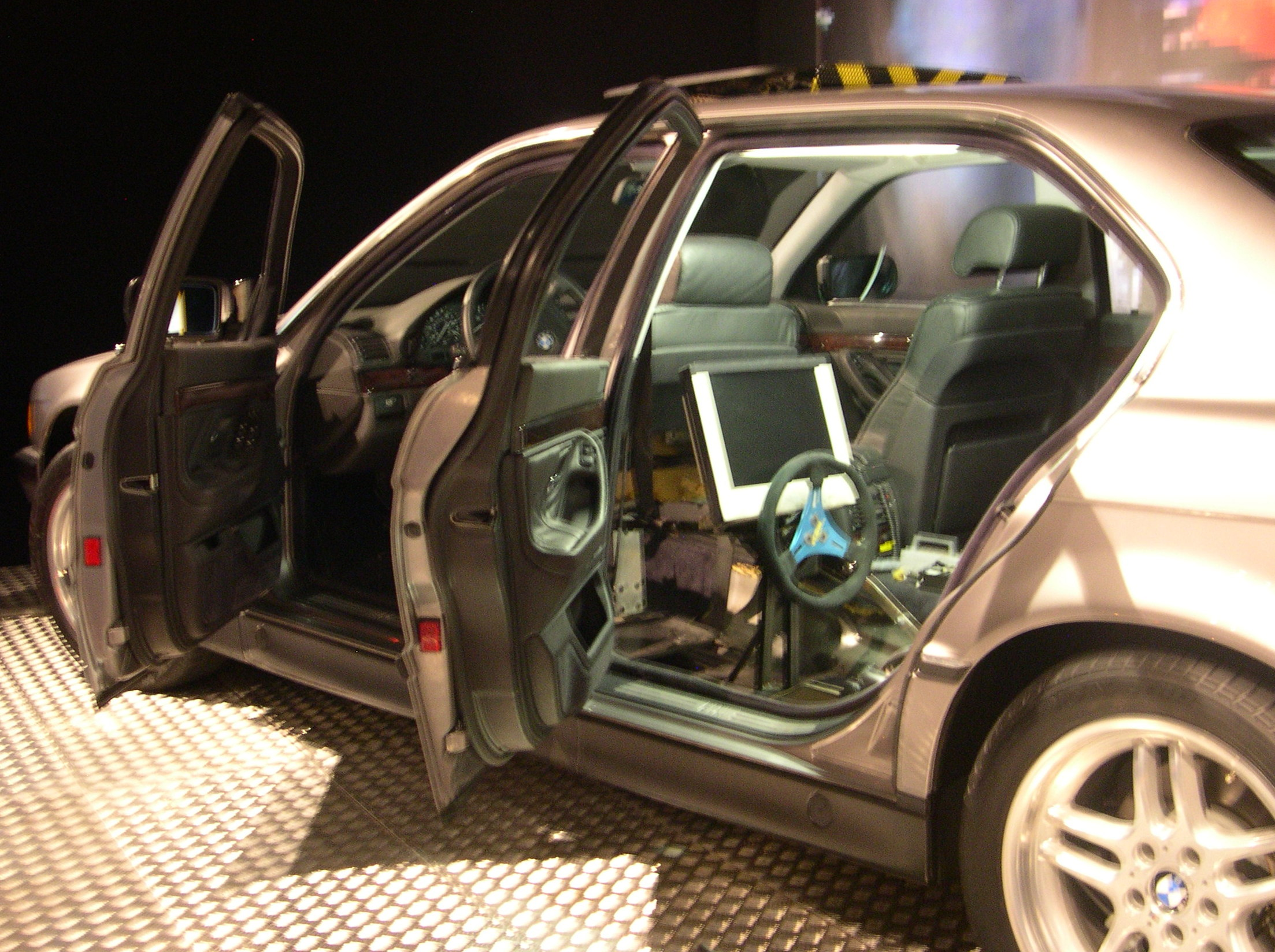
A BMW 740iL from Tomorrow Never Dies

In the 1997 James Bond film Tomorrow Never Dies, the 16 E38 cars used during production were modified so they could be driven from the backseat, making it appear that Bond actor Pierce Brosnan was controlling the car using his mobile phone. The car type is actually a BMW 740iL but they were re-badged as the 750iL. One survives today and can be seen at the exhibition “TOP SECRET” at Museum Industriekultur, Nuremberg.

Besides the E38 saloons, BMW also supplied a $14,000 R1200C motorcycle. BMW received the rights to use movie clips from the film in its multimillion-dollar campaign, and during the 1997 holiday season they offered a special promotion that included the R1200C with the purchase of the 750iL.

Rapper Tupac Shakur and Death Row Records CEO Suge Knight were gunned down in a black 1996 750iL. Shakur succumbed to his injuries but the car itself later was bid at auction in Las Vegas, Nevada, for $1,750,000.
