= Rolls-Royce Silver Seraph =

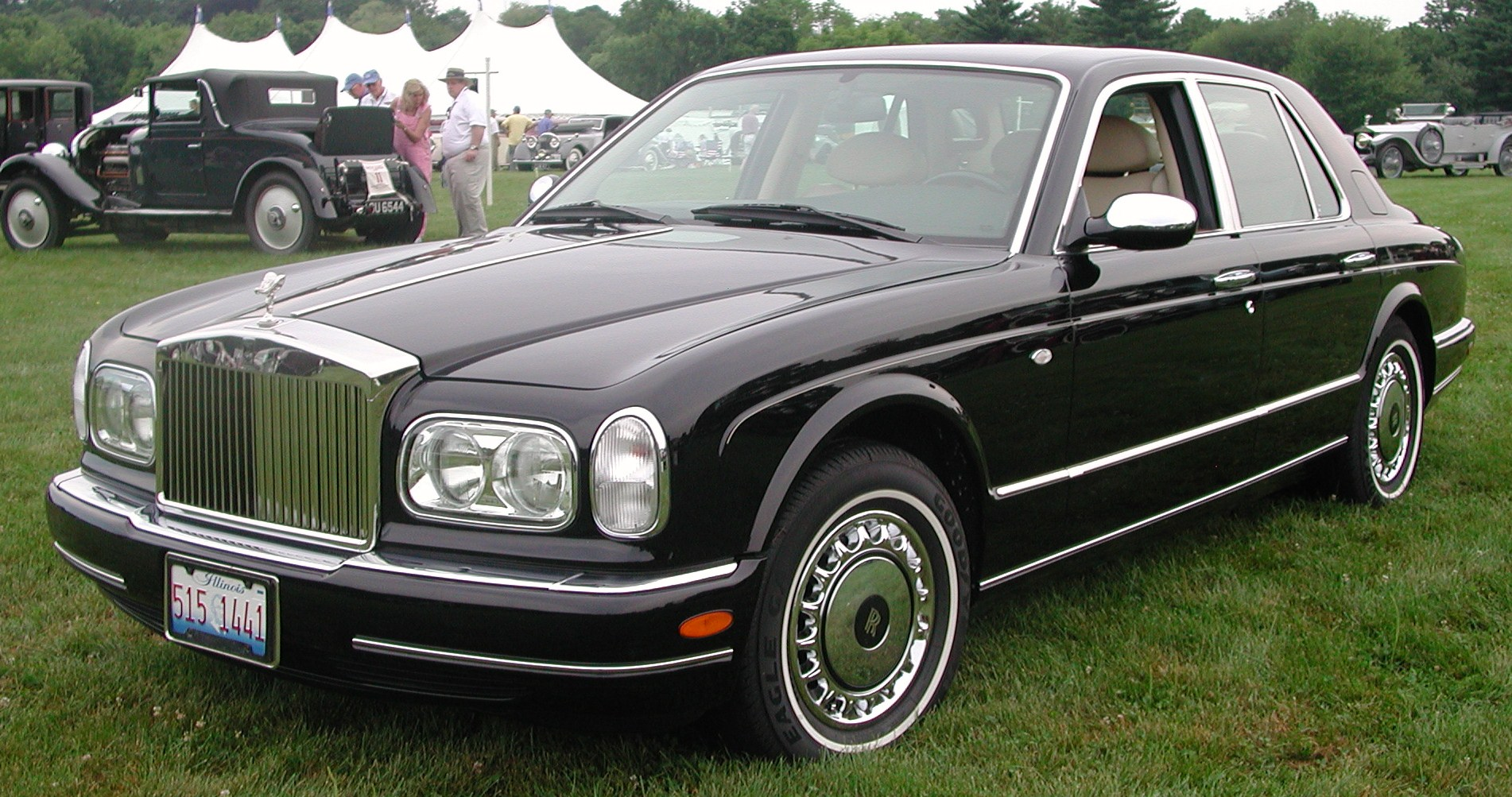

Overview
- Manufacturer: Rolls-Royce Motors
- Production: 1998–2002
- Model years: 1999–2002
- Assembly: United Kingdom: Crewe, England
- Designer: Steve Harper under Graham Hull

Body and chassis
- Class: Full-size luxury car (F)
- Body style: 4-door saloon
- Layout: Front-engine, rear-wheel-drive
- Related: Bentley Arnage

Powertrain
- Engine: 5.4 L M73TUB54 V12
- Transmission: 5-speed ZF 5HP30 automatic

Dimensions
- Wheelbase: 3,117 mm (122.7 in); 3,366 mm (132.5 in) (Park Ward)
- Length: 5,390 mm (212.2 in); 5,639 mm (222 in) (Park Ward)
- Width: 1998–2000: 1,930 mm (76.0 in); 2001–2002: 1,933 mm (76.1 in)
- Height: 1,514 mm (59.6 in)
- Kerb weight: 2,350 kg (5,181 lb); 2,450 kg (5,401 lb) (Park Ward)

Chronology
- Predecessor: Rolls-Royce Silver Spirit (Silver Seraph); Rolls-Royce Silver Spur (Park Ward)
- Successor: Rolls-Royce Ghost (Silver Seraph); Rolls-Royce Ghost EWB (Park Ward); Rolls-Royce Phantom VII (Park Ward)

The Rolls-Royce Silver Seraph and its extended wheelbase version, the Rolls-Royce Park Ward, are full-size luxury automobiles manufactured and marketed by Rolls-Royce Motors from 1998 to 2002. The Silver Seraph (and its Bentley Arnage twin) were launched in March 1998, at the Geneva Motor Show. They replaced the Rolls-Royce Silver Spirit and the slightly longer Silver Spur, made from 1980 through 1997.

Silver Seraph production ended in late 2002, when Volkswagen's marketing licence for the Rolls-Royce marque were handed over to owner BMW, who began to manufacture Rolls-Royce cars (initially the Phantom VII) from 2003, under a new corporation, Rolls-Royce Motor Cars. Production of the Bentley-badged Arnage version continued into the late 2000s, which even involved a return of the (much updated) old 6.75L V8 Rolls-Royce engine.

== Development ==
Development of the Silver Seraph began in the late 1980s, with design work commencing in October 1990. By April 1991, the conceptual design was frozen and approved by the management in June 1991. After several refinements were made, the definitive design was reached in 1994. On 28 July 1995, design patents were filed for both the Rolls-Royce Silver Seraph, and its Bentley Arnage twin utilising production design prototypes as representations. Development concluded after nearly a decade in late 1997, with pre-production models being produced into early 1998 bearing R396 DTU registration plates. The Silver Seraph and Bentley Arnage were first publicly presented on 3 March 1998, at the Geneva Motor Show.

== Description ==
Aside from the radiator grille, badges and wheels, the Seraph was externally identical to the contemporary Bentley Arnage, sharing both its platform and body shell. It was powered by the BMW M73 engine, a 5.4L aluminium alloy V12 engine coupled to a 5-speed automatic transmission, making it the first twelve-cylinder Rolls-Royce since the 1939 Phantom III. The car conforms to the Euro III emission standards.

The body was 65 per cent stiffer than that of its predecessor. Standard electronics included digital engine management, adaptive ride control and anti-lock brakes. The exterior was available in one and two-tone finishes.

Inside, the Rolls-Royce Silver Seraph and the Bentley Arnage were similar yet distinct. The Seraph's gear selector was column-mounted, and gauges followed a traditional Rolls-Royce layout. In both cars, the seats and dashboard were upholstered in Connolly Leather, with dashboard trim and folding picnic trays for rear passengers faced with glossy burl walnut veneer.

The Seraph was known for its relatively limited acceleration and comfortable handling, in comparison to the Arnage, which had a twin turbocharged V8 of its own design and firmer suspension. However, the Seraph still had a top speed of 225 km/h or 140 mph.

The RAC gave the car a rating of 7.6/10, stating "The Silver Seraph marks a new start for Rolls-Royce in their quest to once more be recognised as manufacturers of the world's best cars. And it's quite a credible effort."

== Production ==
The Seraph model was manufactured at the Rolls-Royce factory in Crewe, England. With a base price of £155,175 in the UK and $220,695 in the US, it was second in cost and exclusivity only to the Rolls-Royce Corniche, though it became the least expensive Rolls-Royce after the discontinuation of the Silver Spur.

A total of 1,570 Silver Seraphs were manufactured before production ended in 2002, with the last 170 cars carrying special wing badges, a commemorative plaque, chromed mirror caps, Spirit of Ecstasy hubcaps & red Rolls Royce badging.

== Park Ward model ==
An extended wheelbase 5-passenger version of the Silver Seraph called the Park Ward debuted at the 2000 Geneva Motor Show. Introduced for the 2001 model year, it had 250 mm (9.8 in) added to the size of the doors (mostly the rear), resulting in more leg room for passengers. Rolls-Royce initially planned to build 200 of the model. However, it was discontinued after 2002, with a total of 127 having been produced. It was the last model to use the Park Ward label.

== Gallery ==
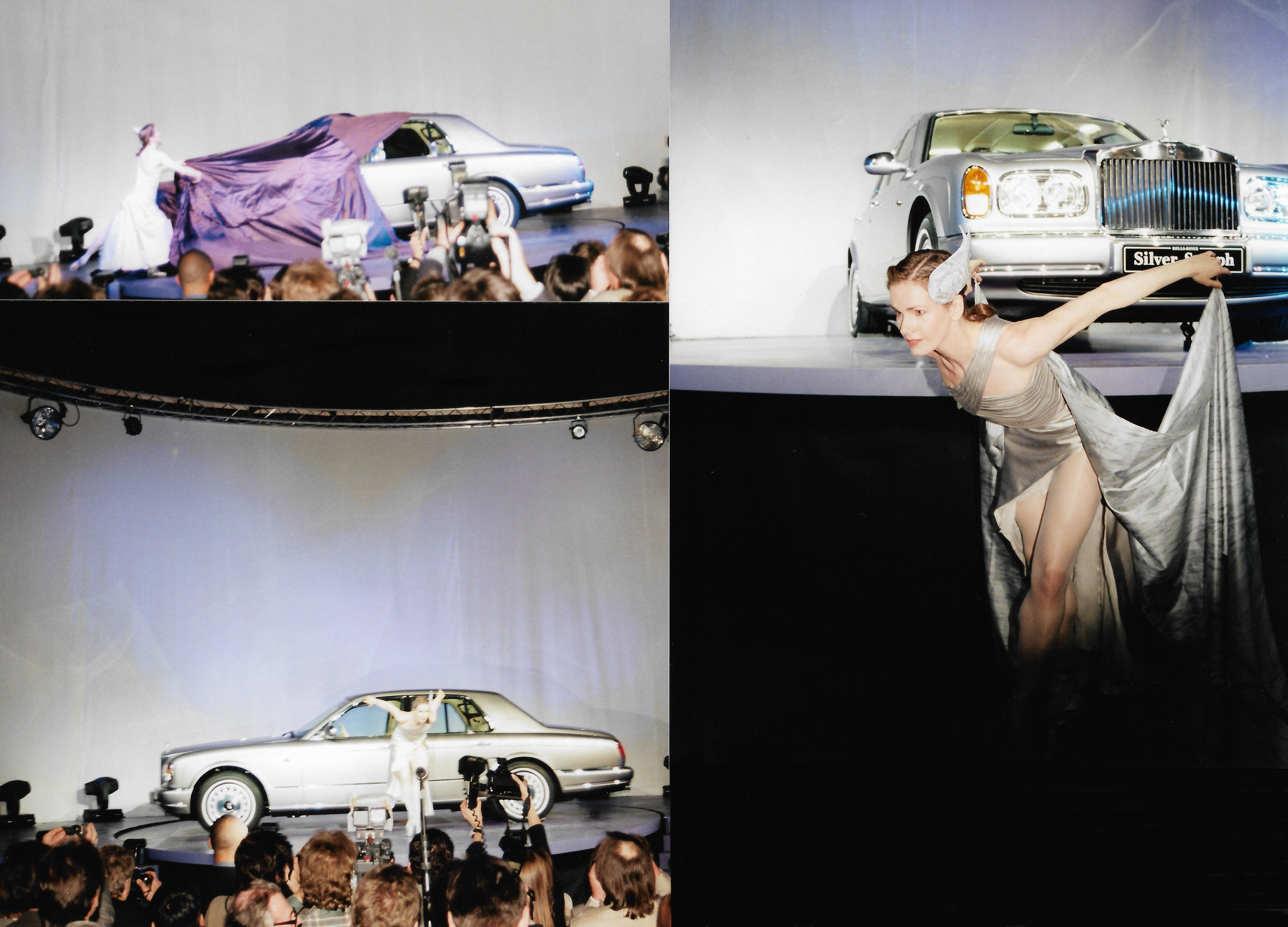
Press presentation, Geneva 1998

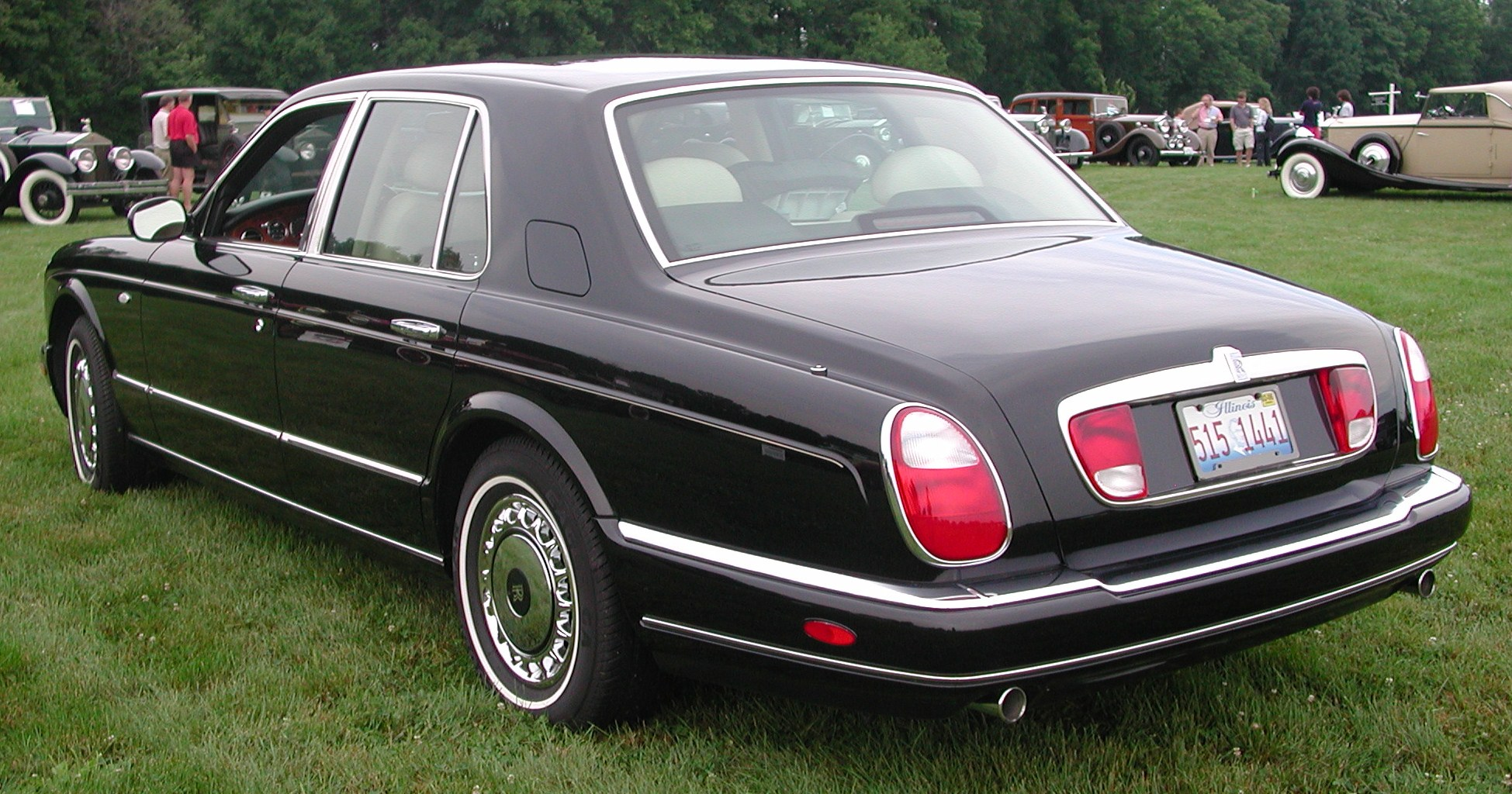
Silver Seraph Rear View

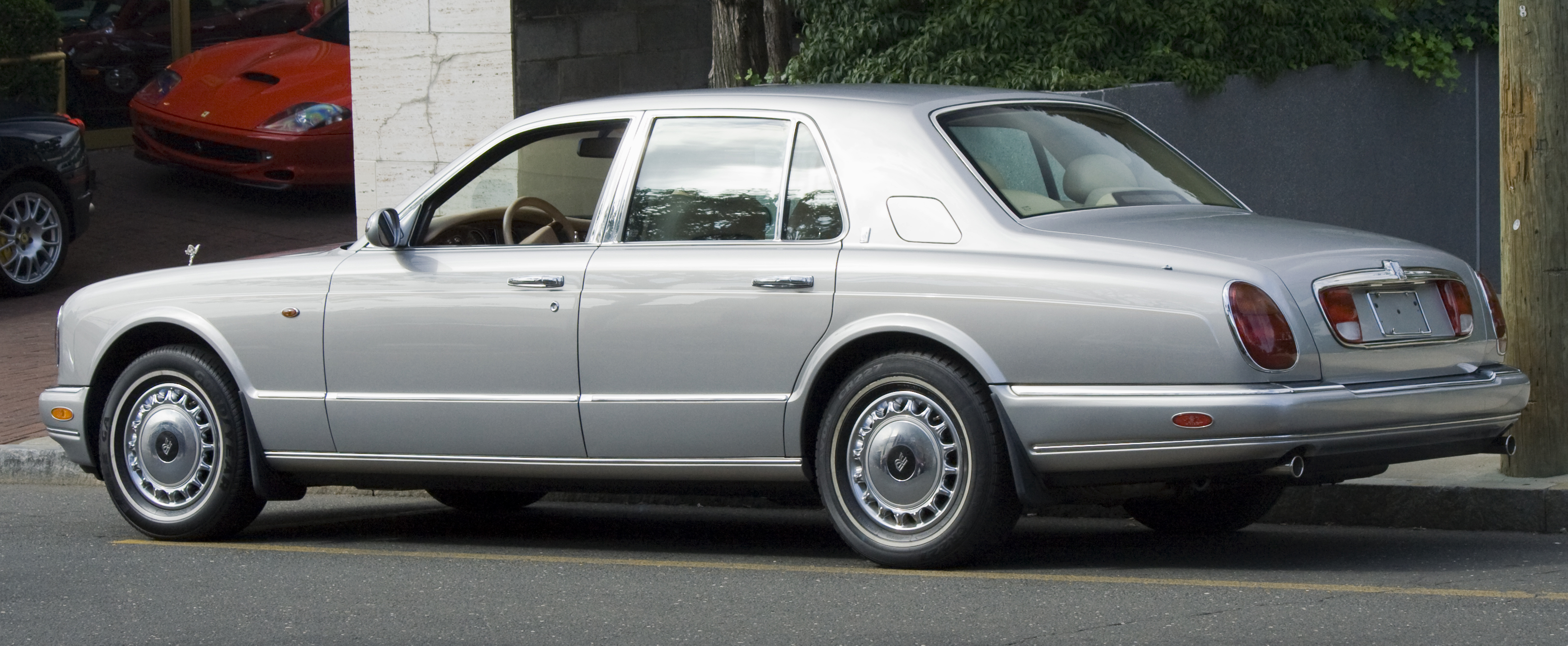
Silver Seraph quarter rear view

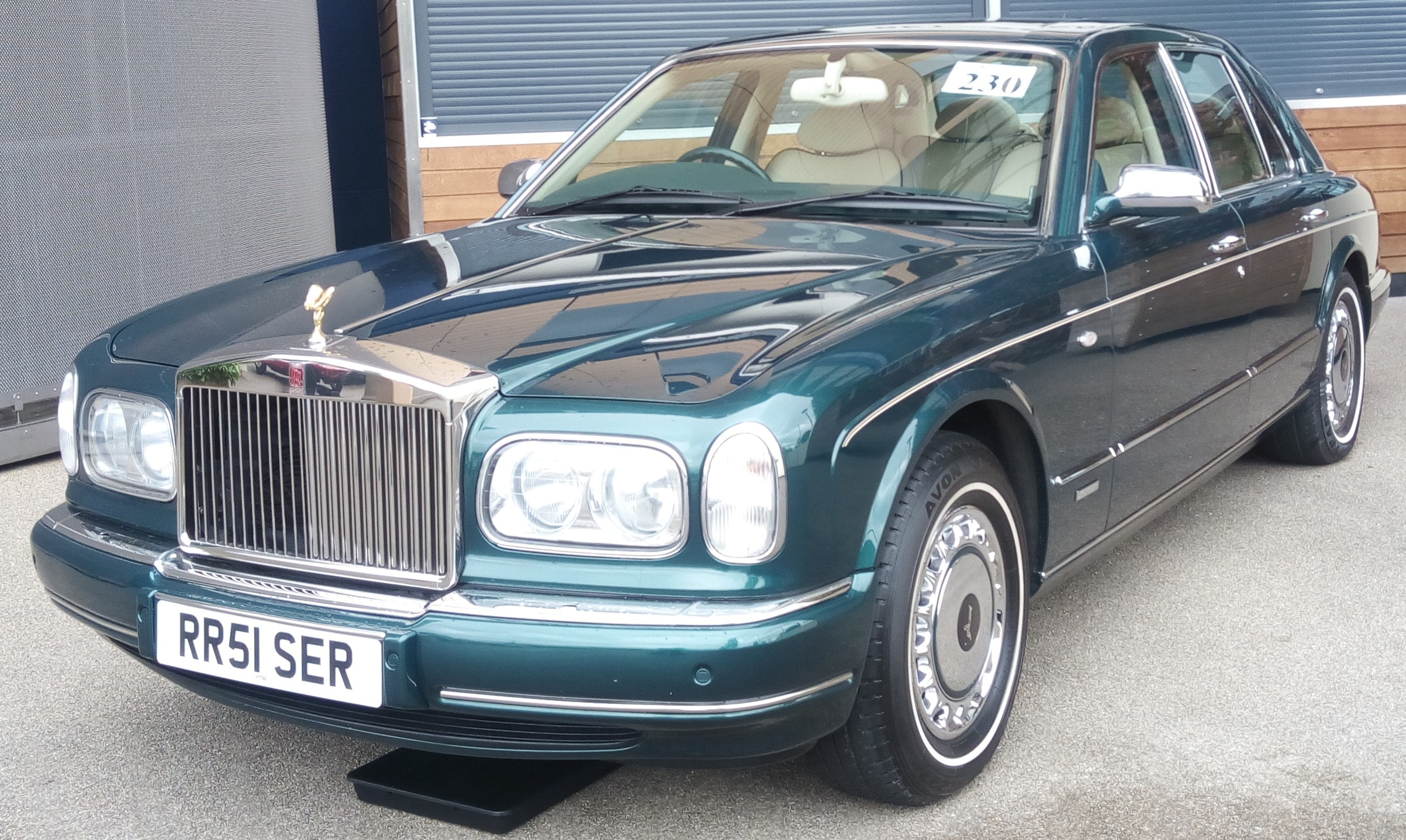
Silver Seraph "Last of Line" quarter front view

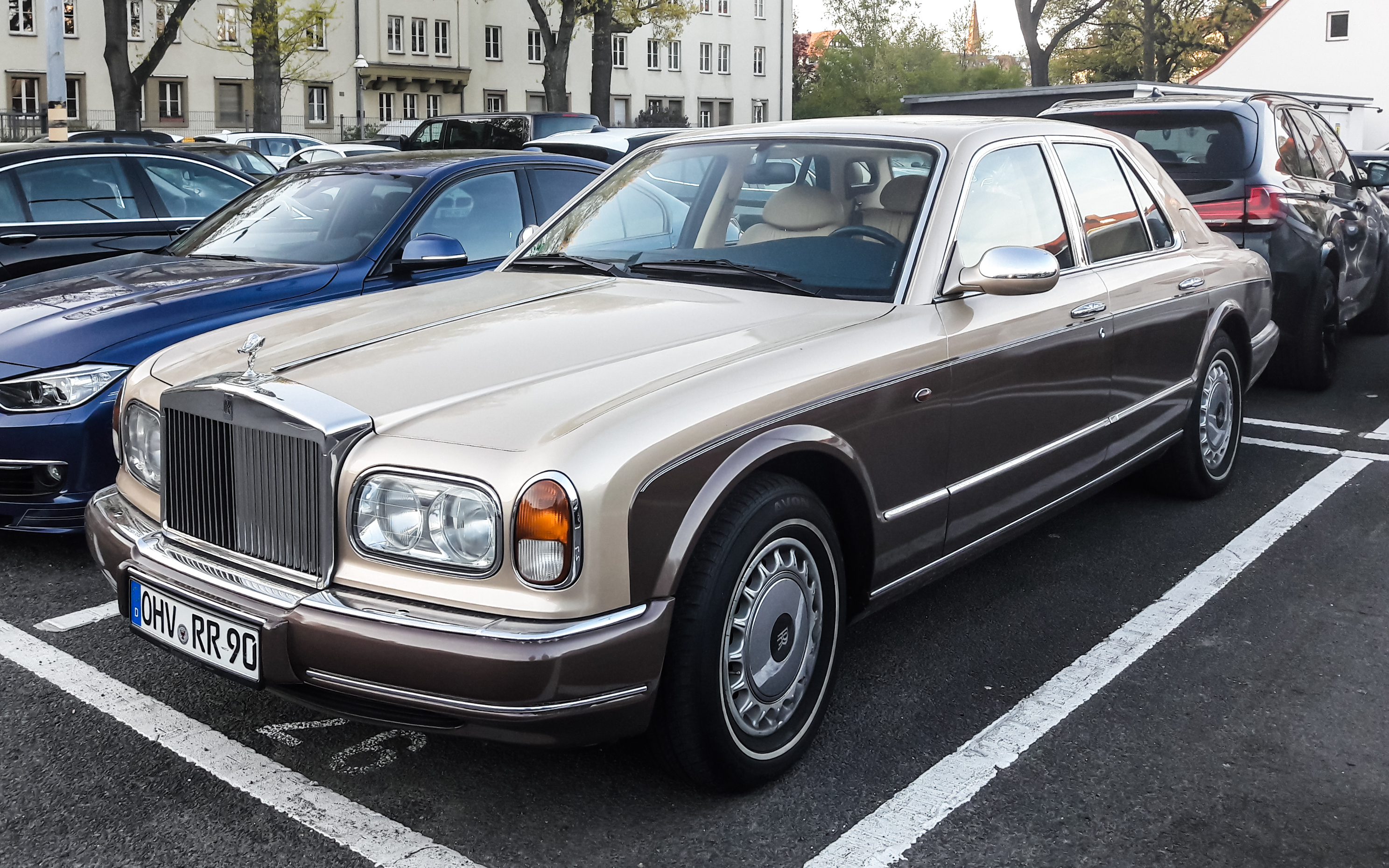
Silver Seraph in an Optional two-tone paint job (front view)

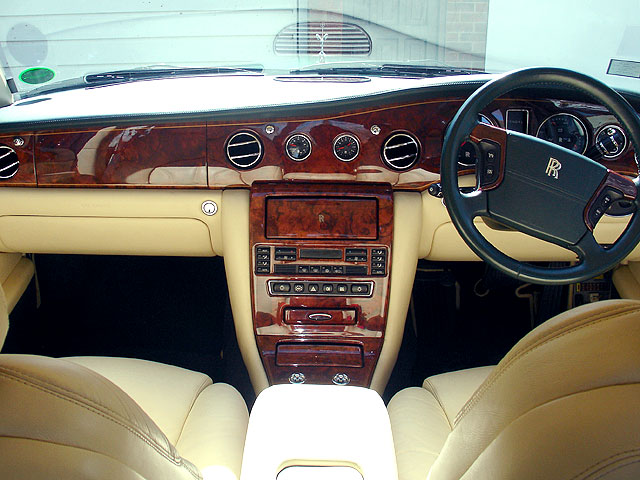
Interior
