= BMW M73 =

BMW M73 engine
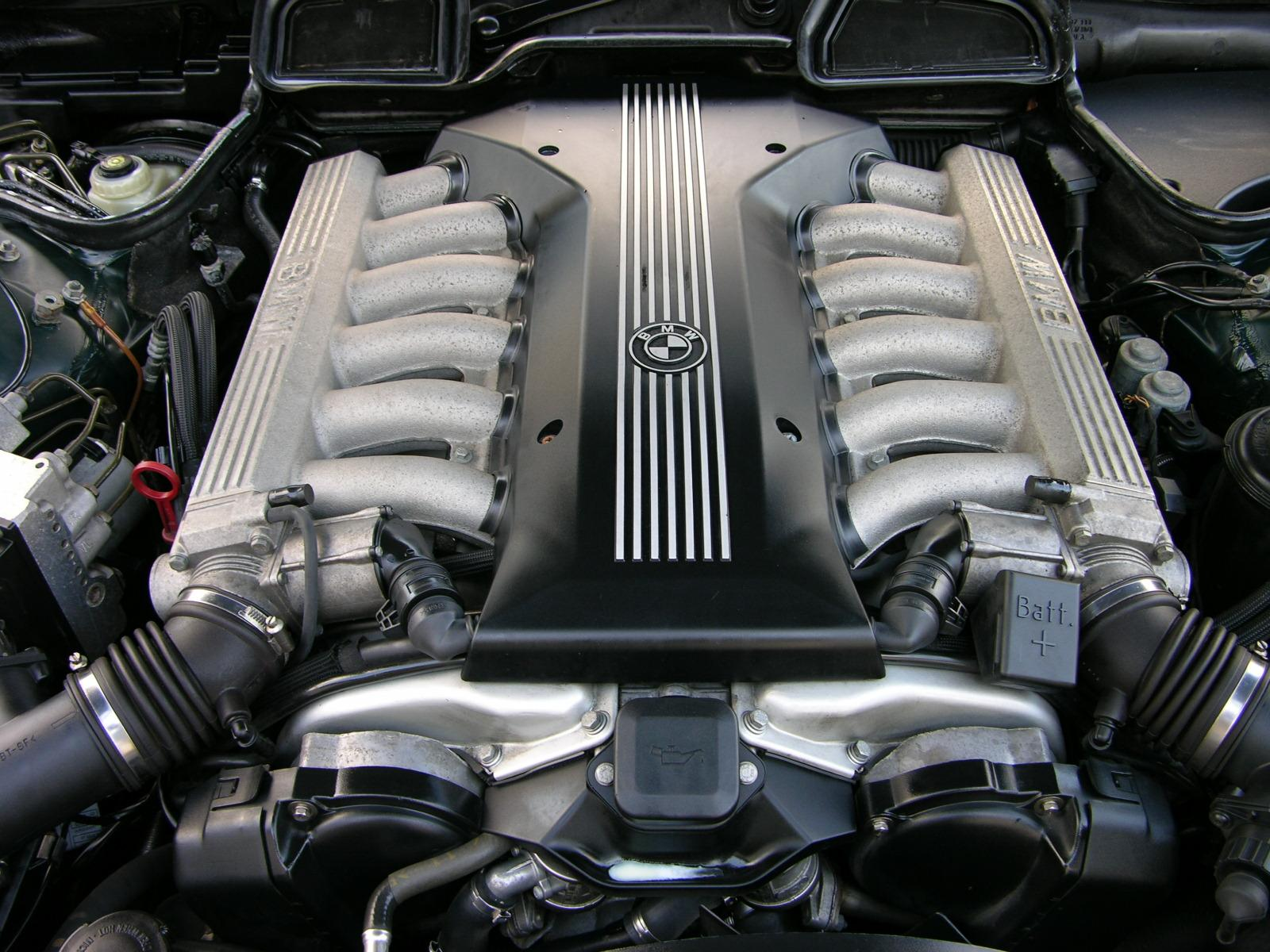

Overview
- Manufacturer: BMW
- Production: 1993–2002

Layout
- Configuration: 60° V12
- Displacement: 5.4 L (5,379 cc)
- Cylinder bore: 85 mm (3.35 in)
- Piston stroke: 79 mm (3.11 in)
- Valvetrain: SOHC
- Valvetrain drive system: Chain

Combustion
- Fuel type: Petrol 95 RON; Hydrogen

Chronology
- Predecessor: BMW M70
- Successor: BMW N73

The BMW M73 is a naturally-aspirated, single overhead camshaft (SOHC), V12 petrol engine which replaced the BMW M70 and was produced from 1993 to 2002. It was used in the BMW E38 7 Series, E31 8 Series and Rolls-Royce Silver Seraph.

== Design ==
Compared with its M70 predecessor, the M73 features an updated roller-rocker valve-train and an increased displacement, due to a bore increase of 1 mm (0.04 in) ending with a cylinder bore of 85mm and a stroke increase of 4 mm (0.16 in) to have a final piston stroke of 79mm. While most other engines in the BMW range had switched to dual overhead camshafts with four valves per cylinder, the M73 used a single overhead camshaft and with two valves per cylinder. However, BMW engineers did create a prototype four-valve per cylinder V12, called the M72, which developed 265 kW (360 PS; 355 hp) and 530 N⋅m (391 lb⋅ft) of torque. However, this 48-valve engine did not fulfill the comfort demands of the large sedan class in all respects and, as a result, did not go into production.

These engines have two separate Bosch Motronic engine control units, which are connected to a third single Siemens control unit, called EML. The engine utilizes four knock sensors mounted on the heads, a cam position sensor mounted on the right head and two crank sensors, one for each ECU. Throttle by wire is used. Similar to its predecessor, the M70, spark distributors are still present for each cylinder bank.

The hydrogen versions of the engine feature a $\lambda \ge 3.0$ lean burn concept, which allows quality torque control similar to a Diesel engine (i. e. no engine throttling). Due to the lower LHV of a hydrogen-air mixture, and the fact that the engine was designed as a Bi-Fuel (petrol and hydrogen) engine, the power output is reduced by 38 per cent compared to the petrol only version of the engine.

== Models ==
Version	Displacement	Power	Torque	Year
M73B54	5,379 cc (328.2 cu in)	240kw (326hp) at 5,000 rpm	490 N⋅m (361 lb⋅ft) at 3,900 rpm	1994
M73TUB54	5,379 cc (328.2 cu in)	240kw (326hp) at 5,000 rpm	490 N⋅m (361 lb⋅ft) at 3,900 rpm	1998
M73 (Hydrogen)	5,379 cc (328.2 cu in)	300 N⋅m (221 lb⋅ft) at 3000 rpm	490 N⋅m (361 lb⋅ft) at 3,900 rpm	2001

=== M73B54 ===
Applications:

- 1994–1998 E38 750i/750iL/L7
- 1994–1999 E31 850Ci

=== M73TUB54 ===
Due to more stringent emissions standards, the 1999 model year marked the addition of an electronically heated catalyst, variable MAP thermostat, and water cooled alternator.

Applications:

- 1998–2001 E38 750i/750iL/L7/hL
- 1998 Cardi Curara
- 1999–2002 Rolls-Royce Silver Seraph
- 2009–2010 Simbol Design Lavazza GTX
- 2013 Monte Carlo Automobile Rascasse

=== M72B54 prototype ===
In 1989, as part of a feasibility study, BMW's engine development department produced a four-valve version of its V12 engine. Only one engine was produced, having an up-sized variant of the M70B50 engine called the M72B54. Bore and stroke was increased to 85mm and 79mm and the total displacement of 5.4L was achieved, matching the values of the standard M73 engine. The power and torque both increased to 265 kW (355 hp) and 530 N⋅m (391 lb⋅ft) respectively.

== Awards ==
- 1999 International Engine of the Year - Best Above 4.0 Litre category winner

== See also ==
- List of BMW engines
