= Getrag 420G transmission =

6-speed manual transmission

The 420G is a 6-speed manual transmission manufactured by Getrag. It is designed for longitudinal engine applications and for use on engines producing up to 499 N⋅m (368 lb⋅ft) of torque.

BMW used this transmission with M60 V8 models such as the European manual 840i, European manual 740i, 540i; as well as the M62 powered 5 series sedans, and S62 powered vehicles such as the Z8 and M5. This gearbox was also used in the E34 M5, E36 M3, and E46 M3s with the S38B38, S50B32, and S54B32 engines respectively.

Gear ratios
1	2	3	4	5	6	R
4.227	2.528	1.669	1.226	1.000	0.828	3.746

Applications:

- 1996-1999 BMW E36 M3 (Euro)
- 2001-2006 BMW E46 M3
- 1993-1996 BMW E34 540i and M5
- 1996-2004 BMW E39 540i and M5
- 1994–1998 BMW E38 7 Series
- 1993–1999 BMW E31 8 series
- 2000–2003 BMW E52 Z8
