= De Tomaso Guarà =

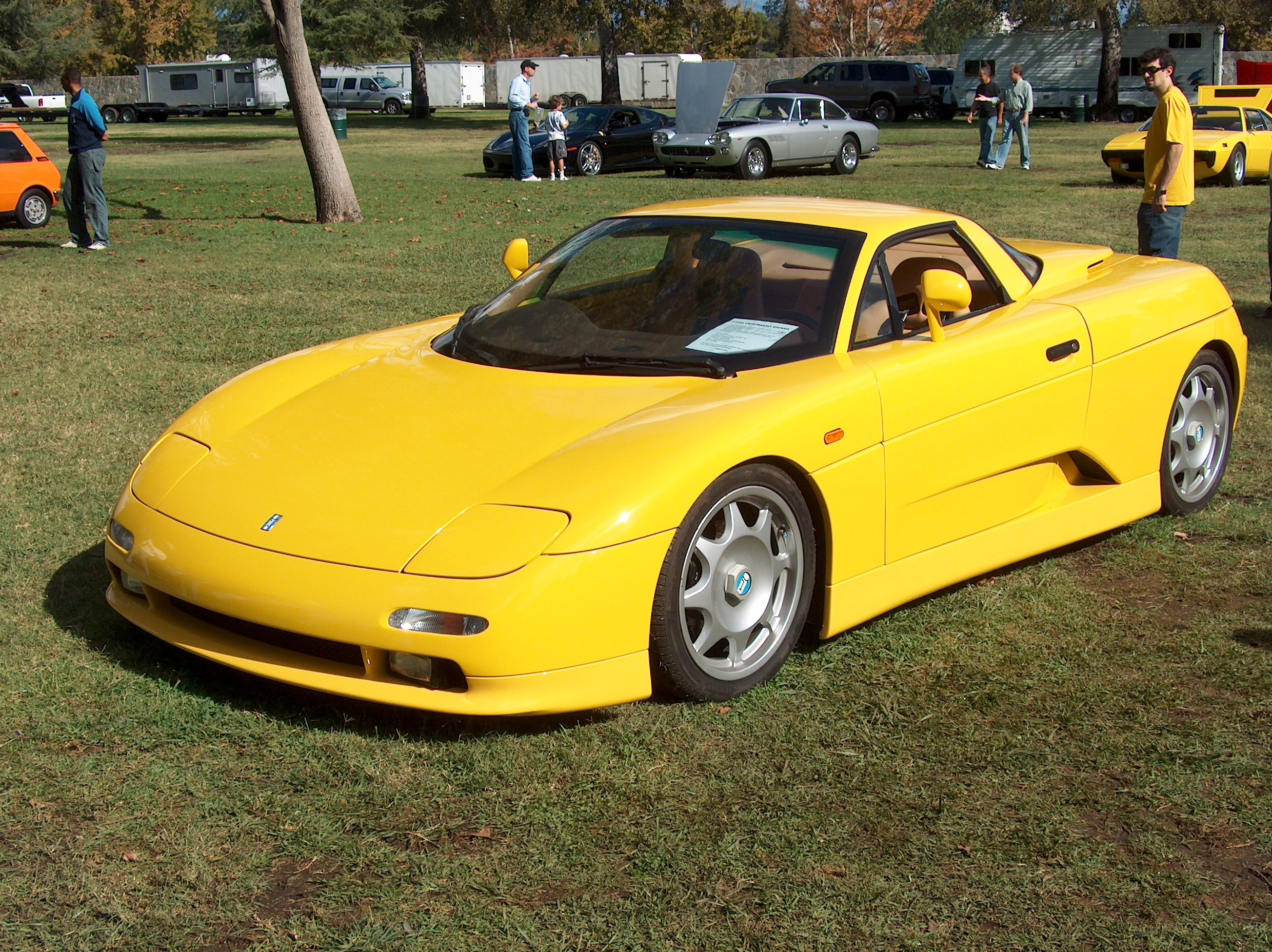

Overview
- Manufacturer: De Tomaso
- Also called: De Tomaso Barchetta
- Production: 1994–2004; 52 produced
- Assembly: Italy: Modena
- Designer: Carlo Gaino at Synthesis Design

Body and chassis
- Class: Sports car (S)
- Body style: 2-door barchetta; 2-door roadster (spider); 2-door coupé
- Layout: Rear mid-engine, rear-wheel-drive
- Related: Maserati Barchetta

Powertrain
- Engine: 4.0 L BMW M60B40 V8 (1993–1998); 4.6 L Ford Modular V8 (1998–2004)
- Transmission: 6-speed Getrag manual

Dimensions
- Wheelbase: 2,610 mm (102.8 in)
- Length: 4,190 mm (165.0 in)
- Width: 2,030 mm (79.9 in)
- Height: Coupé: 1,200 mm (47.2 in); Barchetta: 1,033 mm (40.7 in)
- Curb weight: Coupé (BMW engine): 1,200 kg (2,646 lb); Coupé (Ford engine): 1,400 kg (3,086 lb); Barchetta: 1,050 kg (2,315 lb)

Chronology
- Predecessor: De Tomaso Pantera

The De Tomaso Guarà is a sports car and the last project the founder and owner Alejandro de Tomaso put into the market. Presented at the 1993 Geneva Motor Show, the Guarà was initially available in coupé body-style. Later a roadster and an open-top barchetta bodystyle became available. The latter corresponds to the coupé but without roof and proper windscreen; a small air deflector protects the passenger and the driver from the passing wind and the car had to be driven while wearing a helmet.

== Development ==
The Guarà is based on the Maserati Barchetta Stradale prototype from 1991 which was meant to be the street-legal variant of the track-only car. A take-over of Maserati by Fiat prevented Alejandro de Tomaso from realising such a variant of the Barchetta manufactured by Maserati as Maserati ceased production of the Barchetta under its new owner. The car was thus manufactured by De Tomaso and was named Guarà. The Guarà was designed by Carlo Gaino of "Synthesis Design" who also designed the Maserati Barchetta.

== Production and sales ==
The first cars (mainly Coupés) were sold in 1994 and with some interruptions the Coupé and the Barchetta still were available (prepayment in full required) in 2005/2006 in Italy, Austria and Switzerland. However, it seems there were no cars built after 2004 when the company went into liquidation. The last car, ordered by an Austrian in 2004, was delivered in 2011 after De Tomaso's liquidation was completed.

Though sources vary, approximately fifty-two cars in total were built. Ten were the open top Barchettas, three or four were Spyders (roadsters with a folding soft top), and 38 cars were coupés. The Spyders were converted from coupés by Carrozzeria AutoSport S.r.L. The first Spyder was completed in 1999 to the specifications of a German industrial designer who did not like the standard interior and did not want a fixed roof. The first example received a bespoke interior designed by the buyer and executed by Lupi of Modena, unlike the succeeding examples, which have the same interior as the coupés. Once De Tomaso switched to the Ford engine, no more Spyders could be built as the bulkier American powertrain could not be accommodated.

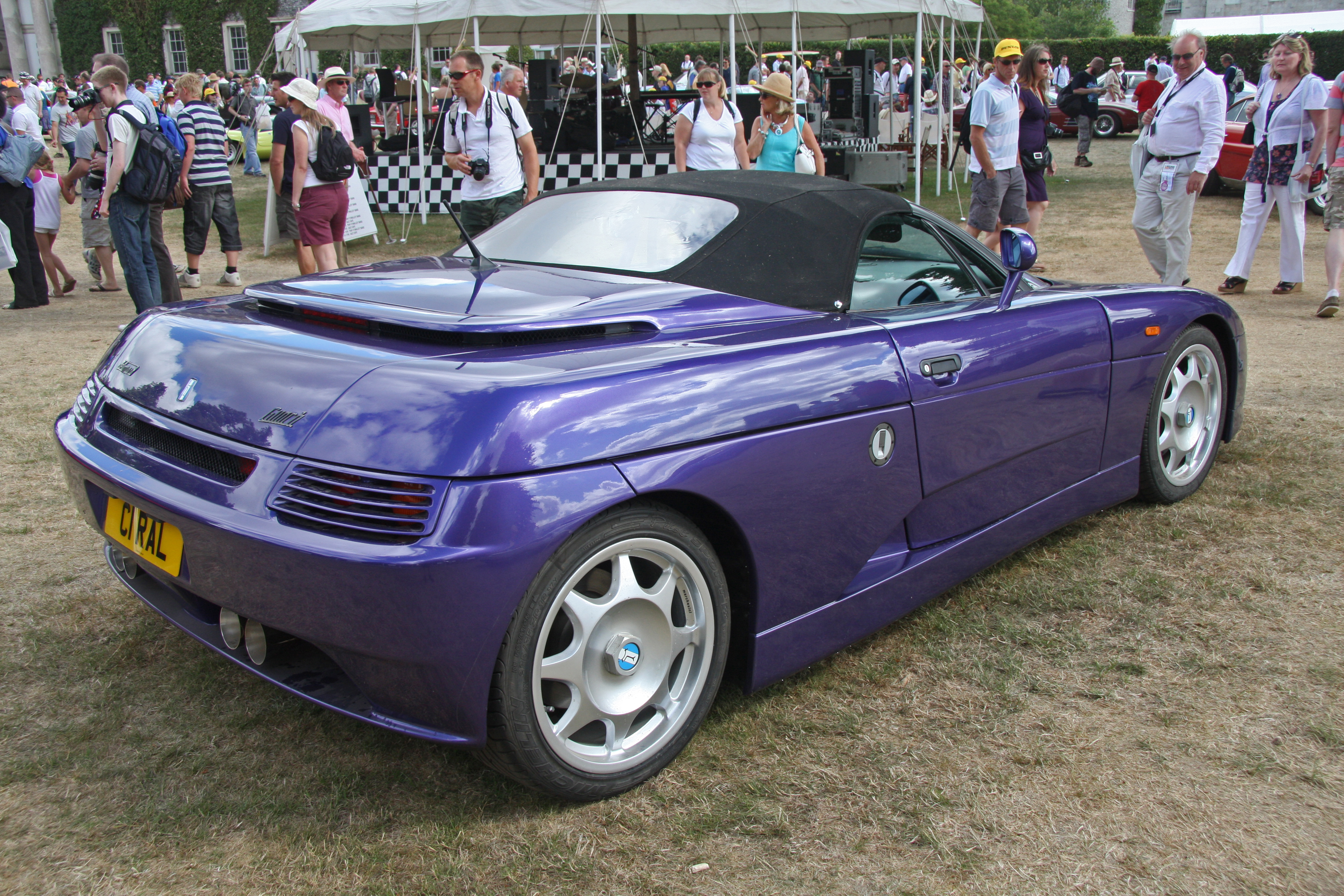
1998 De Tomaso Guarà Spider (BMW-engined); rear view, top up

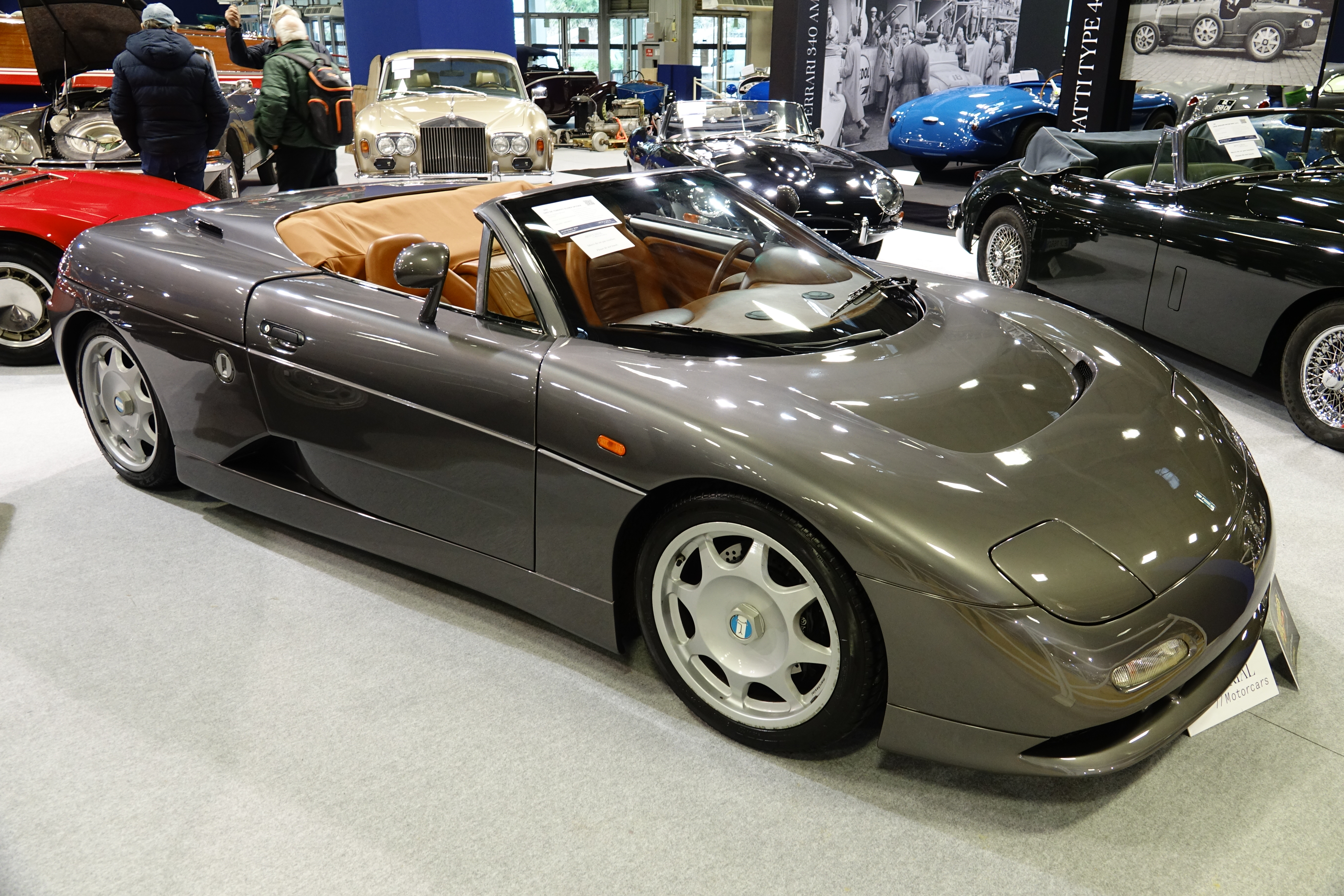
De Tomaso Guarà Spider; front view (the first Spyder built)

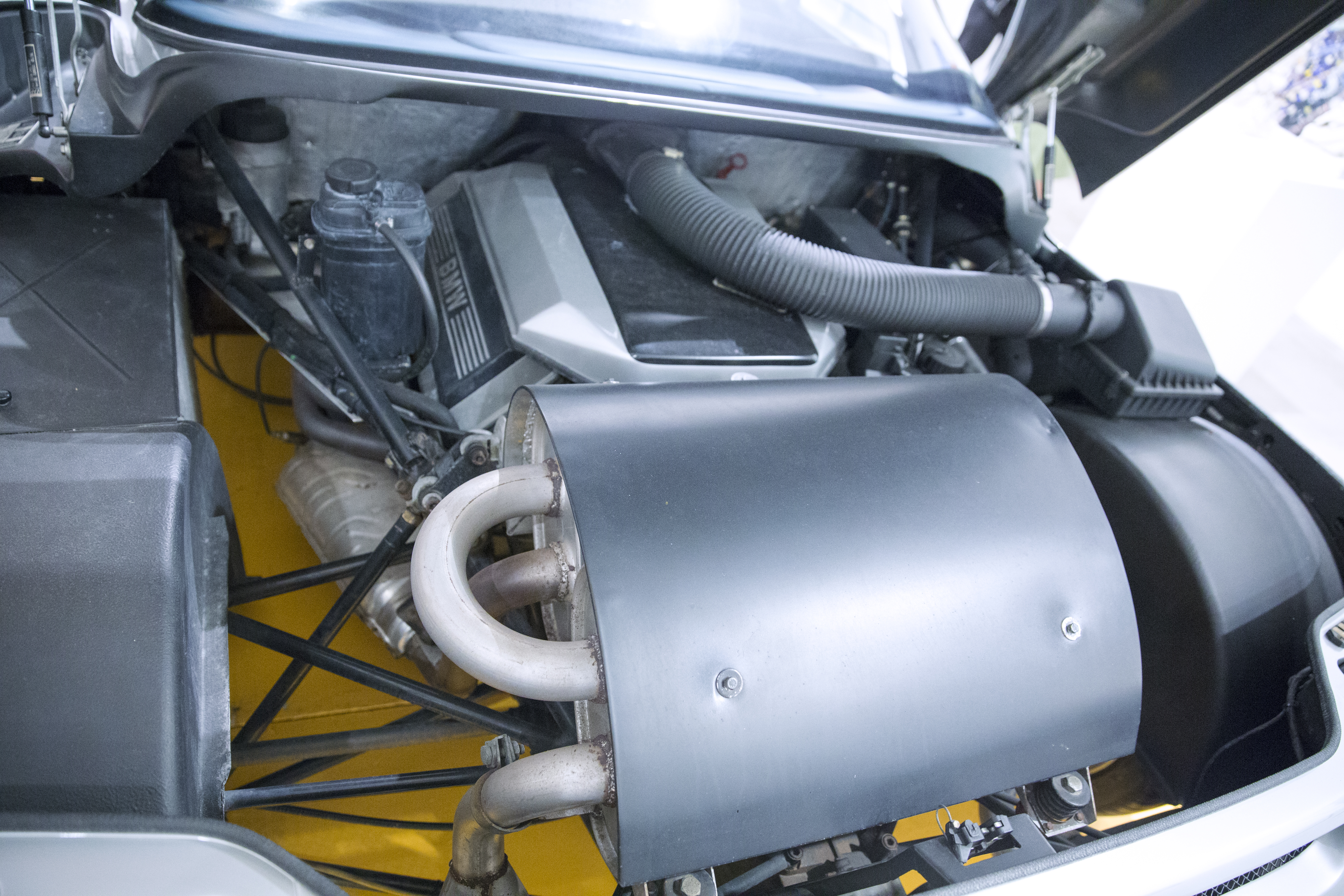
The BMW M60 V8 engine in a Guarà coupé

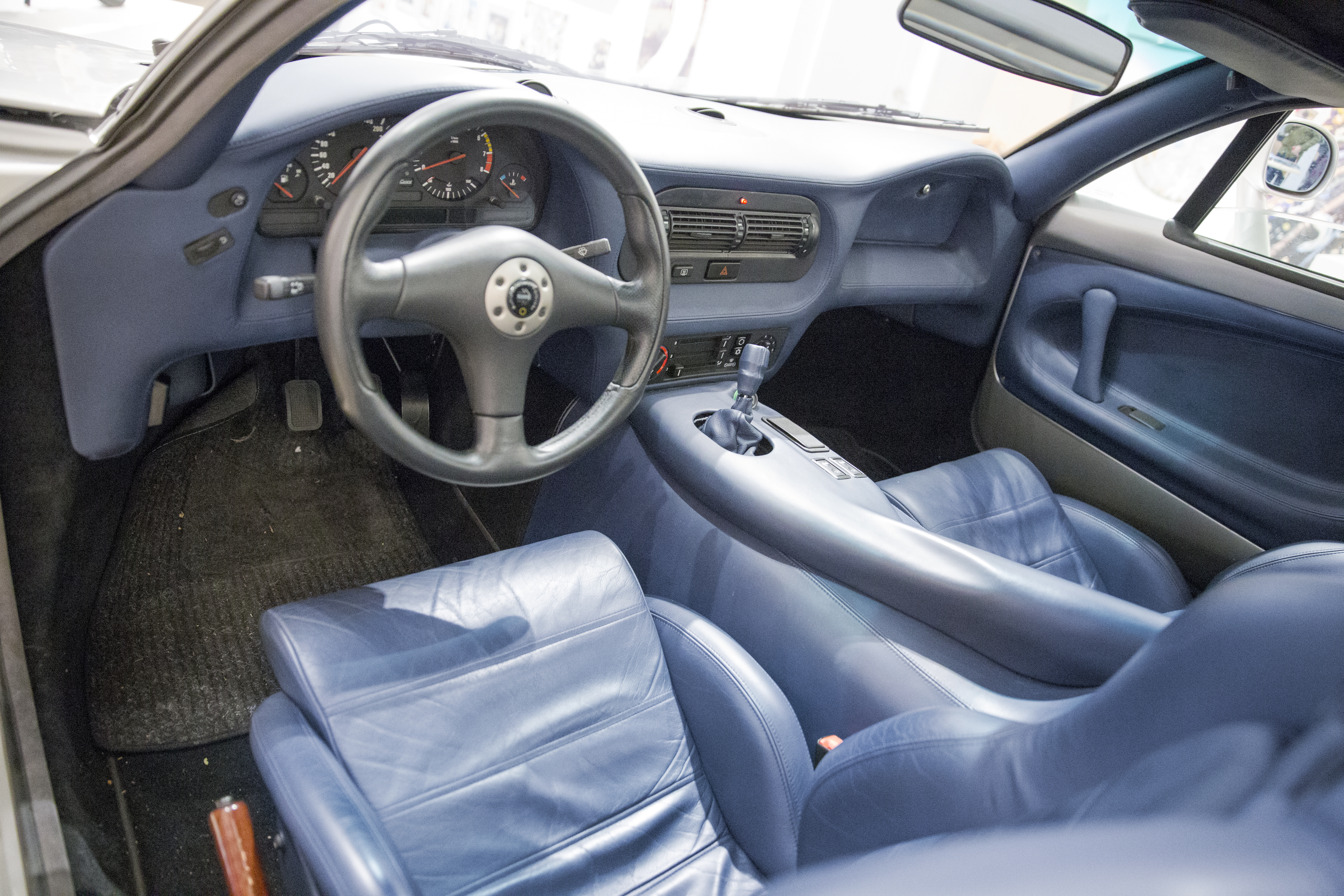
De Tomaso Guarà interior

== Specifications and performance ==
Fibreglass, Kevlar, and other composites make the body shell, fitted to a backbone chassis made from aluminium. The suspension is a reminiscent of Formula 1 and IndyCar technology with independent upper and lower wishbone with pushrod front and rear end suspension having rose-joints designed by famed Formula 1 car engineer Enrique Scalabroni. The Guarà is known for its highly agile handling which makes it a bit too "nervous" for the average driver. It also has no luggage space at all, as the area under the front is utilised by the racing-style suspension. The large, distinct wheels were manufactured by Marchesini.

Early variants of the Guará used the 4.0-litre BMW M60 V8 engine shared with the BMW 840Ci. This was due to Ford's inability to supply engines for the car. The engine was modified by De Tomaso and had different accessory belt routing. The engine has a power output of either 286 or 305 PS (210 or 224 kW; 282 or 301 hp) depending on the tune. A six-speed manual transmission made by Getrag was used to drive the rear wheels and it had a gated shifter for easier gear changes. The engine has a red-line of 7,000 rpm. Later variants switched to the Mustang Cobra's 4.6-litre cast-iron block V8 engine as BMW had phased out the M60 engine. The Ford engine has a power output of 305 PS (224 kW; 301 hp). The brakes are from Brembo and were non-servo assisted. The brakes were similar to those used on the Ferrari F40. Like its predecessors, the Guará did not have a power-steering system as it increased weight.

The interior is upholstered in leather and has racing bucket seats with optional six-point racing harness. Most of the interior components were sourced from BMW. The Guará had the steering and pedals manually adjusted according to the owner's preferred driving position.

The Guará had a dry weight of 1,200 kg (2,646 lb) and had a power-to-weight ratio of 236 PS per tonne with the BMW engine. The Guará could accelerate to 0–100 km/h (62 mph) in a claimed 5.0 seconds and had a claimed top speed of 274 km/h (170 mph).
