= Ascari A10 =

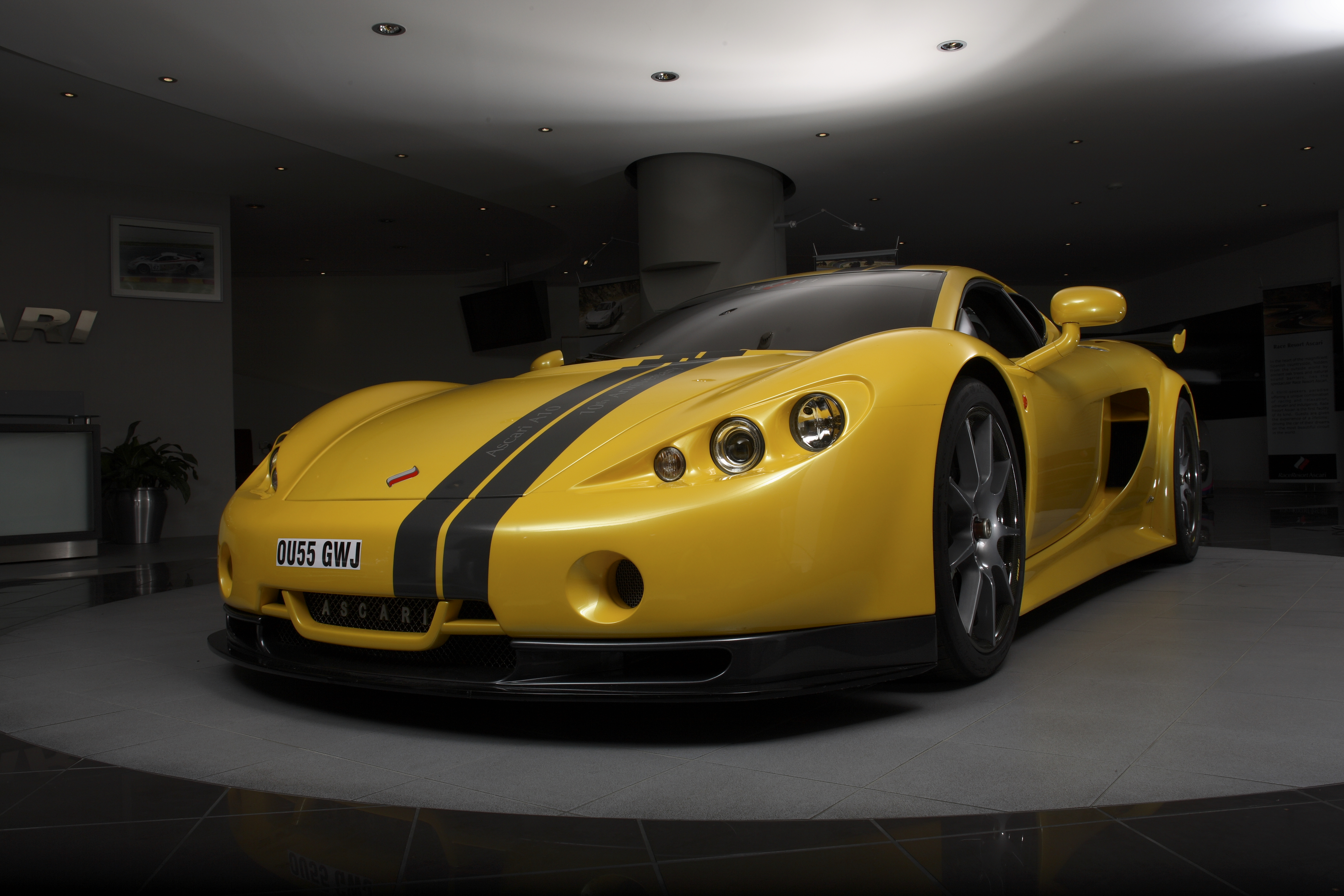

Overview
- Manufacturer: Ascari Cars
- Production: 2006 (prototype)
- Assembly: Banbury, England
- Designer: Paul Brown

Body and chassis
- Class: Concept car / Sports car (S)
- Body style: 2-door coupé
- Layout: RMR layout
- Related: Ascari KZ1, Ascari KZ1-R

Powertrain
- Engine: 4,941 cc (301.5 cu in; 4.9 L) BMW S62 V8
- Transmission: 6-speed sequential manual

Dimensions
- Wheelbase: 2,636 mm (103.8 in)
- Length: 4,300 mm (169.3 in)
- Width: 1,852 mm (72.9 in)
- Height: 1,138 mm (44.8 in)
- Kerb weight: 1,280 kg (2,822 lb)

Chronology
- Predecessor: Ascari KZ1
- Successor: N/A

The Ascari A10 is a prototype automobile produced by the British company Ascari Cars that was conceived by Dutch millionaire Klaas Zwart. It is a road-going evolution of the KZ1-R GT race car that participated in the Spanish GT Championship, with both cars penned by Paul Brown, former designer for the Zakspeed F1 team. It was intended to be the third road car produced by the company, after the Ecosse and the KZ1, with the name A10 intended to commemorate the 10th anniversary of the company, but it did not reach production despite a planned fifty cars.

== Specifications ==
The A10 features a modified 4,941 cc (302 cu in) BMW S62 V8 engine producing 625 bhp (466 kW), delivered via a six-speed sequential manual gearbox, with a regular manual transmission available as an option. The A10 shares the same basic carbon fibre chassis as the KZ1, with all-new bodywork and racing-derived suspension. Despite the addition of an FIA-spec roll cage and the fire suppression system, the removal of soundproofing, air conditioning, and stereo system contributed to the A10's relatively light weight of 1,280 kg (2,822 lb).

== In popular culture ==
On 9 December 2007, the Ascari A10 was featured in the UK show Top Gear and driven around the track by The Stig in 1:17.3. This made it the fastest car at the time, and, as of 2023, the 21st fastest.
