= Ascari KZ1 =

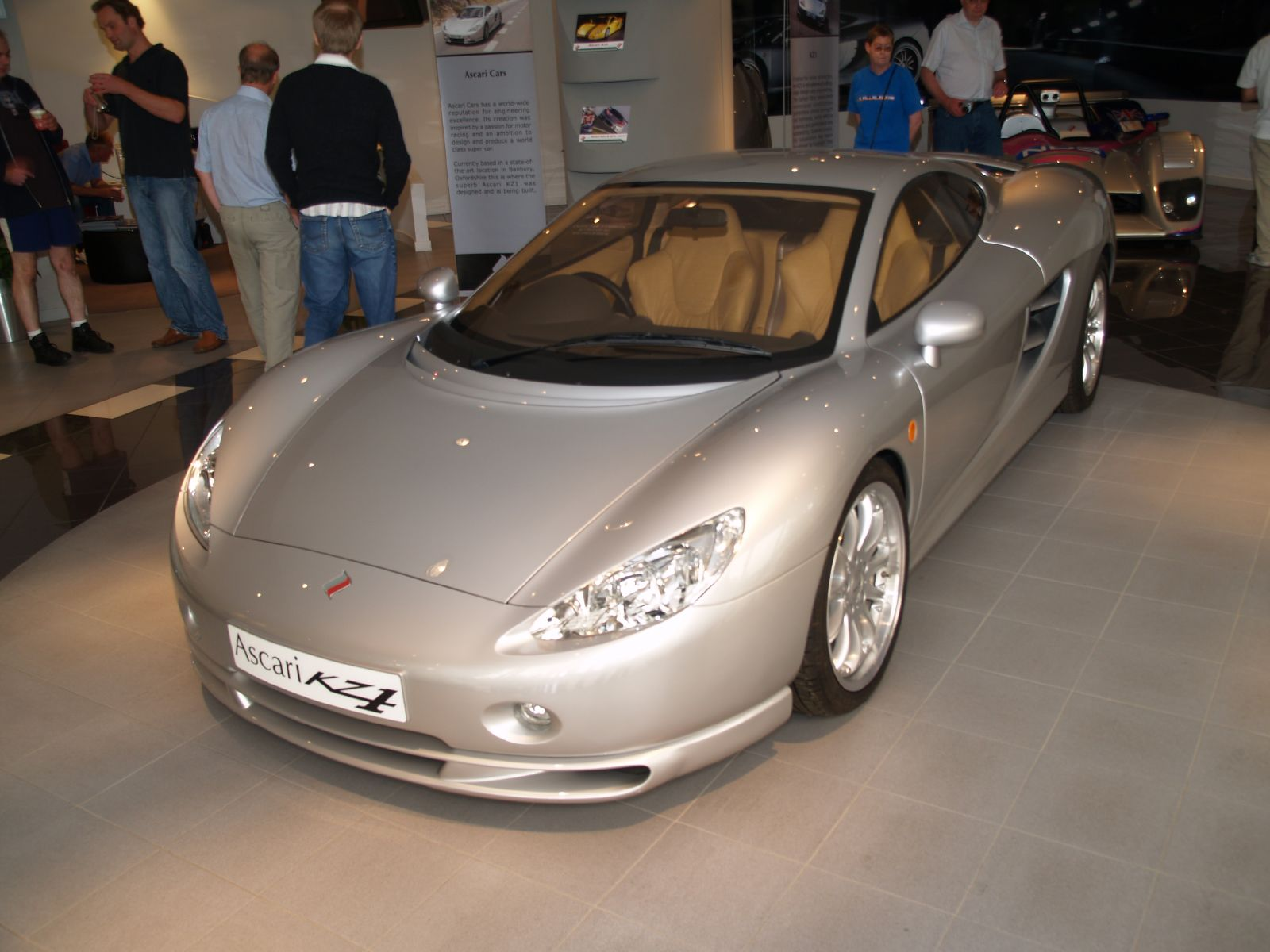

Overview
- Manufacturer: Ascari Cars
- Production: 2003–2010; 50 produced
- Assembly: Banbury, England
- Designer: Paul Brown

Body and chassis
- Class: Sports car (S)
- Body style: 2-door coupé
- Layout: Longitudinal RMR layout
- Related: BMW M5 (E39); BMW Z8

Powertrain
- Engine: 4.9 L BMW S62 V8
- Transmission: 6-speed manual

Dimensions
- Length: 4,300 mm (169.3 in)
- Width: 1,852 mm (72.9 in)
- Height: 1,138 mm (44.8 in)
- Kerb weight: 1,275 kg (2,811 lb)

Chronology
- Predecessor: Ascari Ecosse
- Successor: Ascari A10

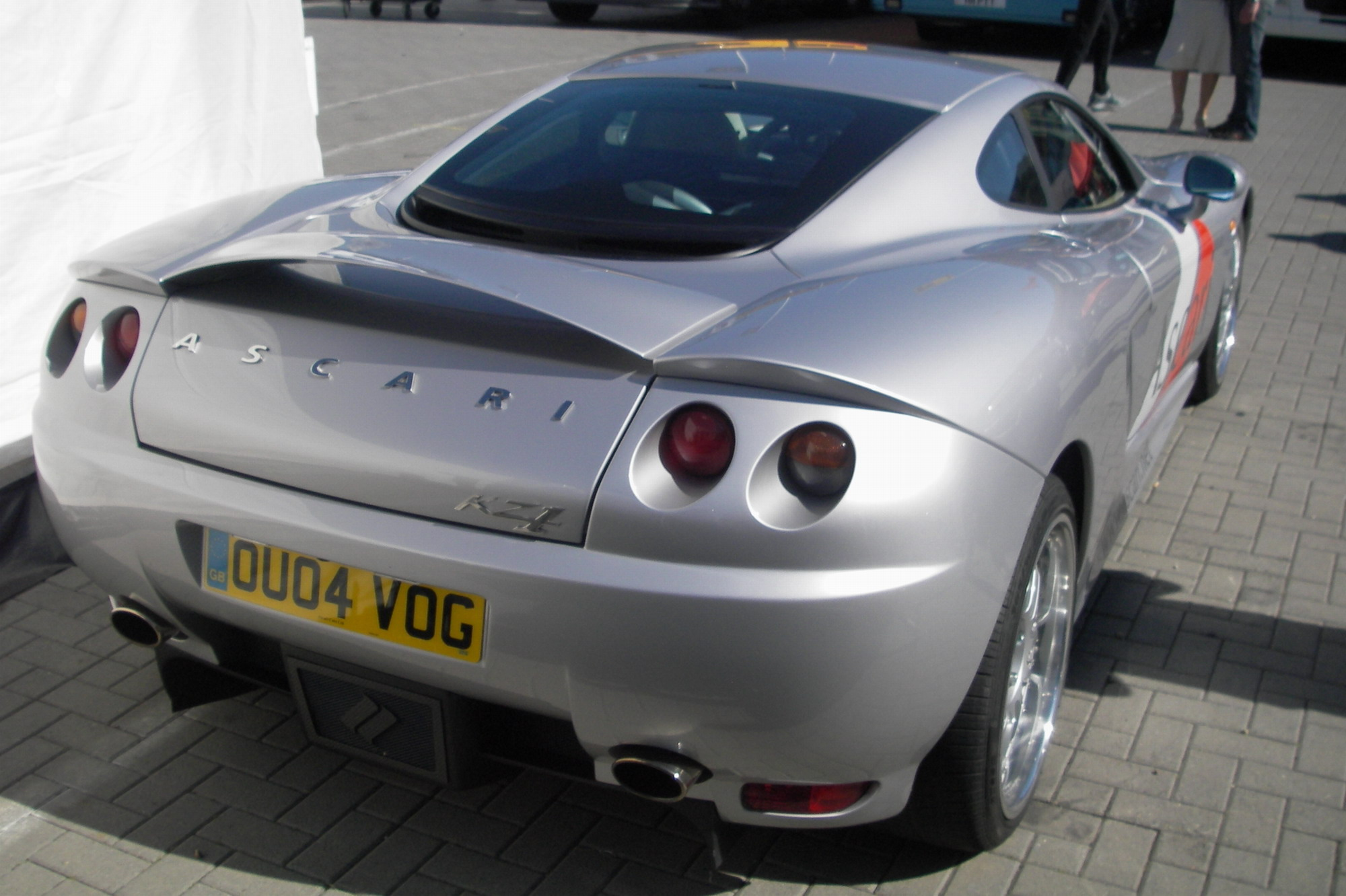
Ascari KZ1 rear

The Ascari KZ1 is a sports car made by Ascari Cars. The car is named from the initials of Ascari's owner Klaas Zwart, a wealthy Dutch businessman.

The KZ1 made its worldwide debut at the 2003 Autosport International with a price tag of £235,000. Each car required 340 hours of handcrafting at Ascari's 45,000 square-foot manufacturing facility in Banbury, England by a team of 30 highly skilled craftsmen. Owners also received the opportunity to drive the car at the Ascari-managed Race Resort Ascari in Spain. Production was limited to 50 units.

== Specifications ==
Engine	BMW S62 V8 with dry sump lubrication
Position	Mid-longitudinal
Aspiration	Natural
Valvetrain	4 valves per cylinder with variable valve timing
Displacement	4,941 cc (4.9 L; 301.5 cu in)
Bore	94 mm (3.7 in)
Stroke	89 mm (3.5 in)
Power	500 bhp (373 kW; 507 PS) @ 7000 rpm
Power to displacement ratio	101 hp per litre (75.5 kW/L)
Power to weight ratio	420 bhp per long ton (280 W/kg)
Torque	550 N·m (406 lb·ft) @ 4500 rpm
Transmission	6-speed CIMA manual
Brakes	AP Racing callipers and discs with 6-piston callipers at the front and 4-piston callipers at the rear.
Acceleration	0–60 mph (0–97 km/h) in 3.7 seconds 0–100 mph (0–161 km/h) in 8.0 seconds
1/4 Mile time	11.8 seconds at 124 mph (200 km/h)

== Performance ==
The KZ1 is powered by a highly tuned BMW S62, a 4,941 cc (4.9 L) V8 engine originally used in the E39 M5 and Z8. The car can attain a maximum speed of 201 mph (323 km/h) and can accelerate from 0–60 mph (0–97 km/h) in 3.7s and from 0–100 mph (0–161 km/h) in 8.0s.

== Ascari KZ1-R ==
Ascari KZ1-R
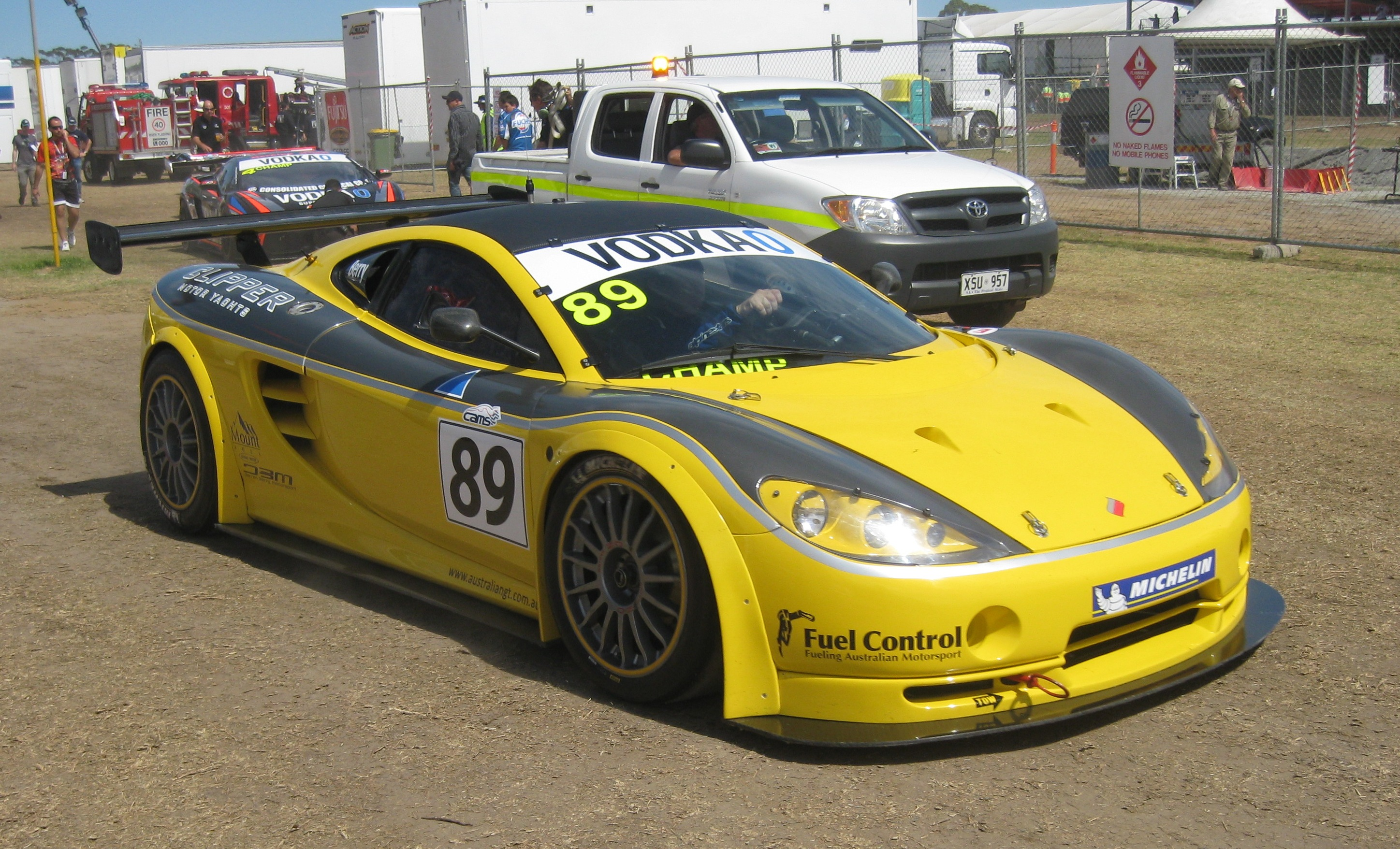

Overview
- Manufacturer: Ascari
- Production: 2005–2010
- Designer: Paul Brown

Body and chassis
- Class: Racing car
- Body style: 2-door coupé
- Related: Ascari KZ1

Powertrain
- Engine: 4.9 L BMW S62 V8
- Transmission: 6-speed manual

Dimensions
- Length: 4,300 mm (169.3 in)
- Width: 1,852 mm (72.9 in)
- Height: 1,138 mm (44.8 in)
- Kerb weight: 1,250 kg (2,756 lb)

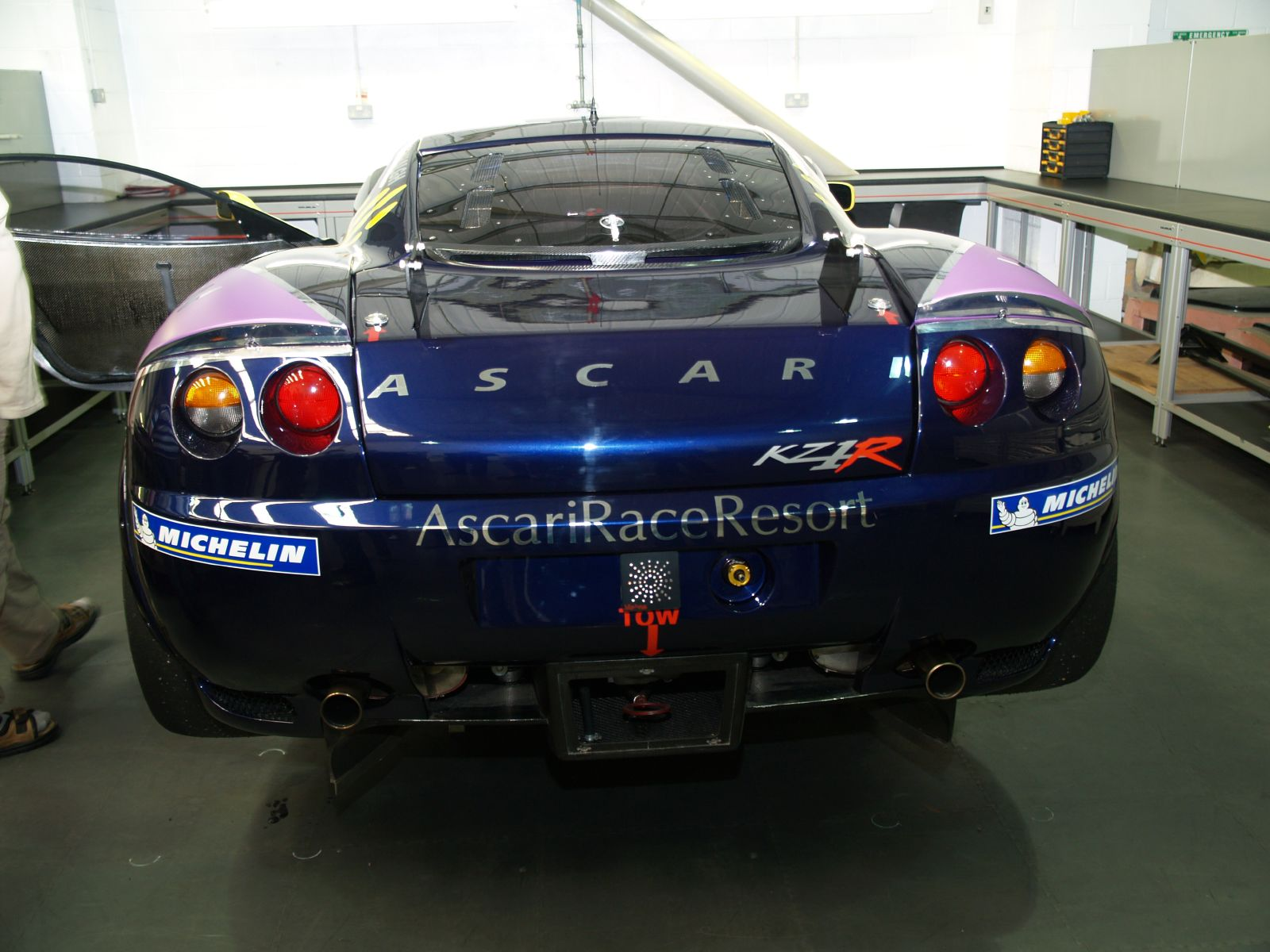
Ascari KZ1R GT3

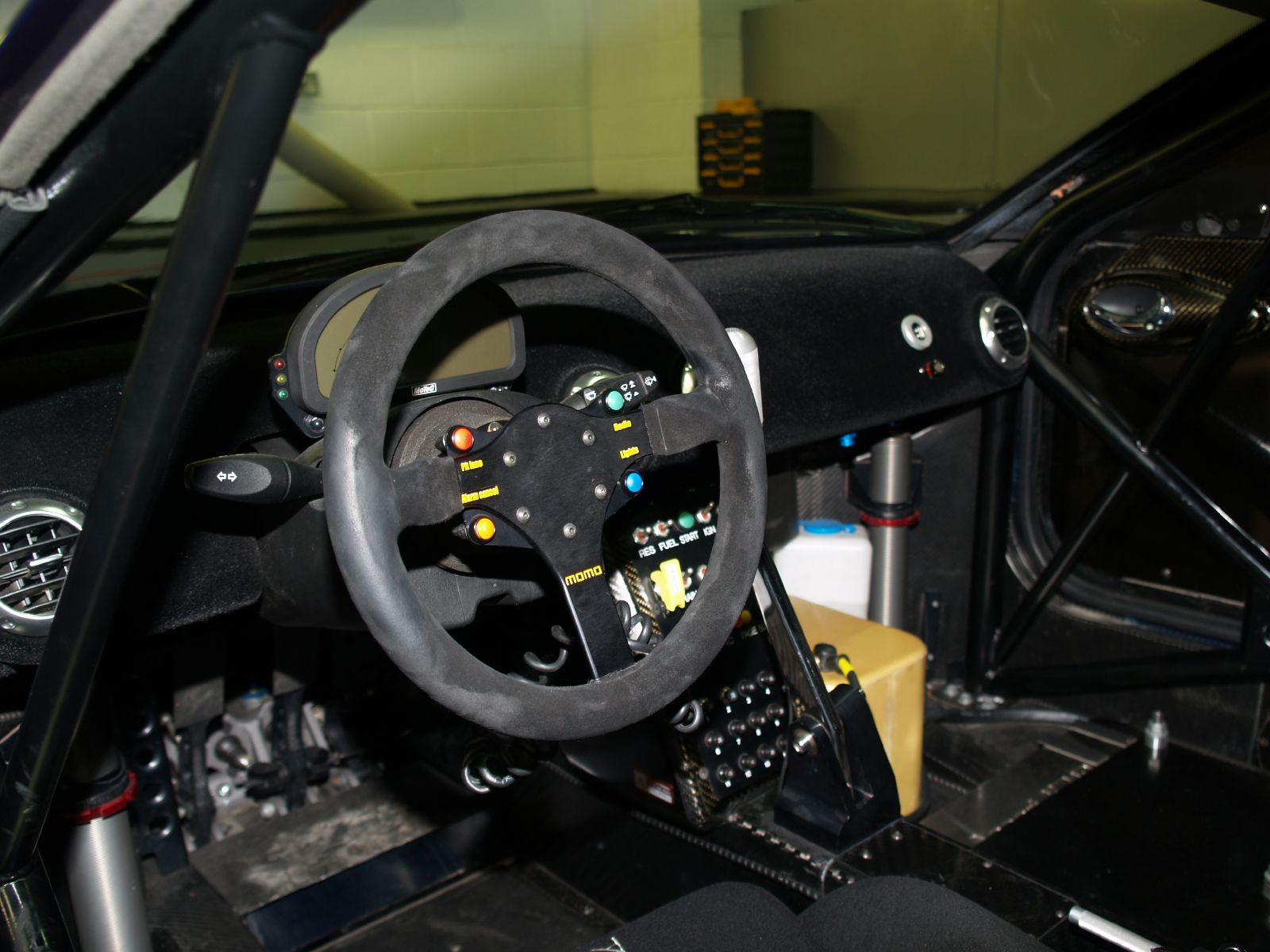
Interior

The Ascari KZ1-R is the racing version of the Ascari KZ1, primarily being featured in the new FIA GT3 European Championship and the United SportsCar Championship as well as other small level championships which run a similar formula. The KZ1-R is similar to the road going KZ1, but vastly improved. The most obvious differences between the KZ1 and KZ1-R lie on the exterior of the car. Tuned for racing, the KZ1-R is still a pure road car in every right, but with the invigoration of a GT3 racer. The front lip spoiler has been updated with a pronounced splitter for increased down-force. Also unlike the KZ1, the race version features a large fixed racing wing, in place of the small adjustable spoiler found on the road car. The headlights have also been modified, with HID bulbs and turn signals, losing the silver, crystallized look of the KZ1. The rear fenders of the car have also been increased slightly to house the larger wheelbase. The wheels are forged aluminium alloy, to further reduce curb weight. The car features a stripped down interior with power windows removed, fine leather replaced by Alcantara, cloth, and carbon fibre racing seats and an integral roll cage, which adds rigidity to the car's body during races. Curb weight is reduced to an astounding 1,250 kg (2,755.8 lb), which is achieved by its carbon fibre chassis tub and a carbon fibre body shell. The KZ1-R retains power steering, a feature that is usually absent from race cars.

=== Engine ===
The KZ1-R uses the same mid-mounted, naturally-aspirated, dry sump BMW S62 90-degree V8, but it has been tuned for a total of 520 bhp (388 kW; 527 PS) at 7000 rpm. Displacement stays the same at 4,941 cc (4.9 L; 301.5 cu in), with torque at 550 N⋅m (406 lbf⋅ft) at 4500 rpm. This allows the KZ1-R to achieve a power to weight ratio of 416 bhp (310 kW; 422 PS) per tonne.

=== Chassis and brakes ===
The KZ1-R uses a carbon fibre chassis and a tubular steel rear frame. Both front and rear suspension are double-wishbone with coil over dampers, mated to anti-roll bars for stability. The wheels are 19-inch (483 mm) forged aluminium racing wheels mounted to 305/30x19 tires in the rear and 235/35x19 tires in the front. The front brakes are cross-drilled and vented with 6-piston racing-type calipers at the front and four-piston calipers at the rear.

Gear	1	2	3	4	5	6	Final Drive
Ratio	2.875:1	1.773:1	1.267:1	1.000:1	0.833:1	0.621:1	3.70:1

=== Performance ===
The KZ1-R can accelerate from 0–62 mph (0–100 km/h) in 3.8 seconds, thanks to its increased power-to-weight ratio. Ascari claimed a 0–100 mph (0–161 km/h) acceleration time of 8.0 seconds along with a maximum speed of 201 mph (323 km/h). The racing version manages to reach 62 mph (100 km/h) in about four-tenths of a second less than the standard KZ1, with numbers comparable to the Lamborghini Murcielago LP640.

== Other media ==
The KZ1 was featured in November 2005 on the BBC television show Top Gear, where it set the 5th fastest lap time ever recorded on the show at 1 minute 20.7 seconds; currently, the KZ1 holds 26th place, the seventh-fastest time being 1:17.3 set by an Ascari A10.
