= BMW M60 =

V8 DOHC piston engine produced by BMW between 1992 and 1996

BMW M60 engine
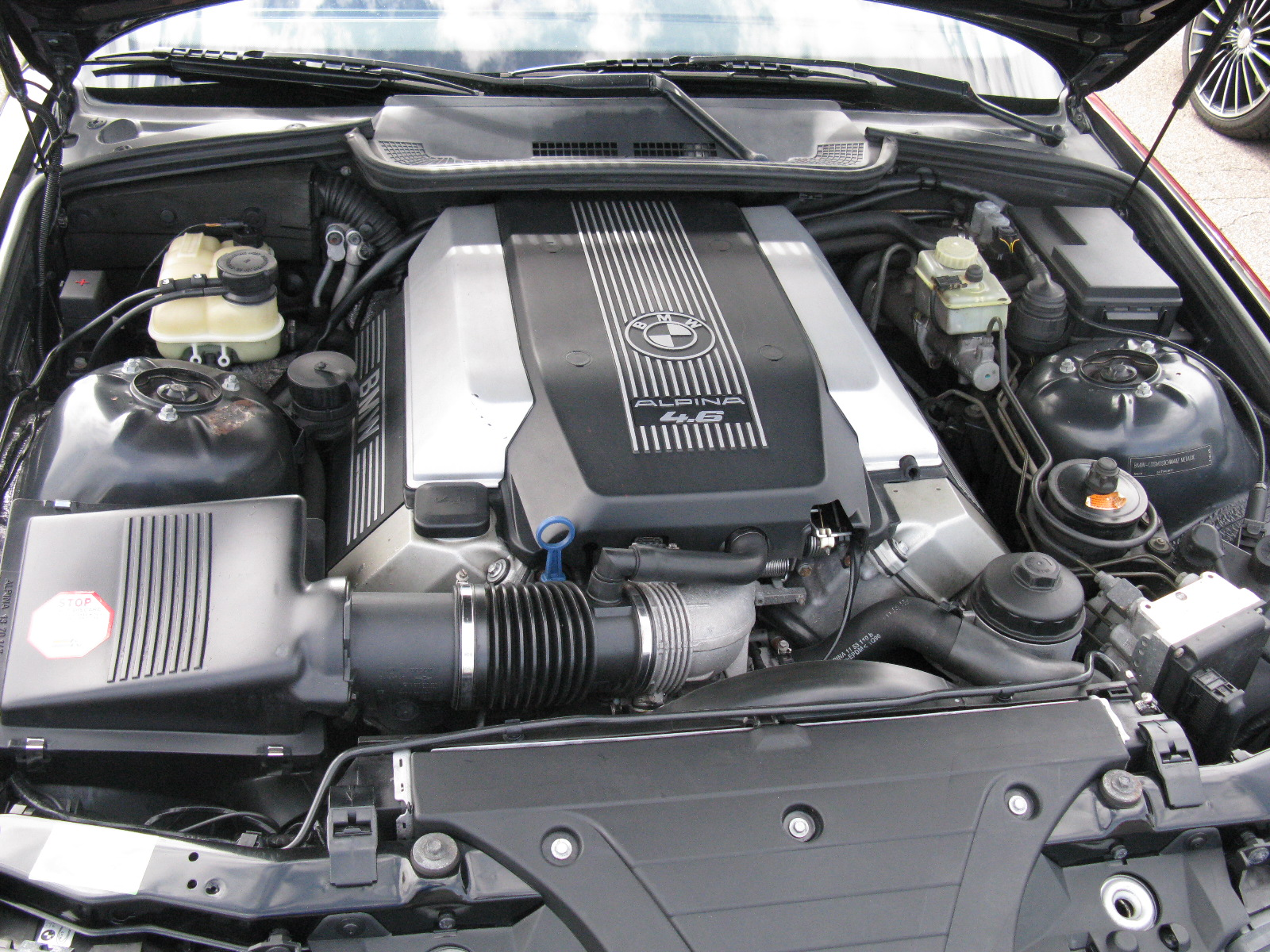
- Alpina version of the M60 engine

Overview
- Production: 1992–1996

Layout
- Configuration: 90° V8
- Displacement: 3.0 L (2,997 cc); 4.0 L (3,982 cc)
- Cylinder bore: 84 mm (3.31 in); 89 mm (3.50 in)
- Piston stroke: 67.6 mm (2.66 in); 80 mm (3.15 in)
- Cylinder block material: Aluminum
- Cylinder head material: Aluminum
- Valvetrain: DOHC
- Valvetrain drive system: Chain

Combustion
- Fuel type: Petrol

Chronology
- Predecessor: BMW OHV V8 and M30]
- Successor: BMW M62

The BMW M60 is a naturally aspirated V8 petrol engine which was produced from 1992 to 1996. It was BMW's first V8 engine in over 25 years.

The M60 was replaced by the BMW M62 engine.

== Development ==
During the 1970s, BMW produced a prototype V8 engine for the E23 7 Series, however this engine did not reach production.

Development of the M60 began in 1984.

== Design ==
The M60 engine has double overhead camshafts with four valves per cylinder. The camshaft is driven by a dual-row timing chain with a self-adjusting tensioner. Valves had hydraulic lash adjustment to reduce maintenance. The ignition and fuel injection systems are controlled by the Bosch Motronic 3.3 system, and the ignition system is a coil-on-plug design with knock sensors.

To reduce weight, the engine uses aluminum for both the engine block and cylinder head, magnesium valve covers and a plastic intake manifold. The M60 was BMW's first car engine to use a "split conrod" design, where sintered connecting rods are made as a single piece and then fractured in order to ensure increased rigidity and an exact fit. The dry weight of the engine is between 175 kg (386 lb) and 203 kg (448 lb).

== Versions ==
Engine	Displacement	Power	Torque	Years
M60B30	2,997 cc (182.9 cu in)	160 kW (218 PS; 215 bhp) at 5800 rpm	290 N⋅m (214 lb⋅ft) at 4500 rpm	1992-1996
M60B40	3,982 cc (243.0 cu in)	210 kW (286 PS; 282 bhp) at 5800 rpm	400 N⋅m (295 lb⋅ft) at 4500 rpm	1992-1996

=== M60B30 ===
The M60B30 has a bore of 84 mm (3.31 in) and a stroke of 67.6 mm (2.66 in), for a displacement of 2,997 cc (182.9 cu in). Compression ratio is 10.5:1, giving an output of 160 kW (215 bhp) at 5800 rpm and 290 N⋅m (214 lb⋅ft) at 4500 rpm.

Applications:

- 1992–1995 E34 530i
- 1992–1994 E32 730i
- 1994–1996 E38 730i

=== M60B40 ===
The M60B40 has a bore of 89 mm (3.50 in) and a stroke of 80 mm (3.15 in), for a total displacement of 3,982 cc (243.0 cu in). Compression ratio is 10.0:1, giving 210 kW (282 bhp) at 5800 rpm and 400 N⋅m (295 lb⋅ft) at 4500 rpm. It had a forged crankshaft.

Applications:

- 1993–1995 E34 540i
- 1992–1994 E32 740i
- 1994–1996 E38 740i
- 1992–1996 E31 840i
- 1993–1998 De Tomaso Guarà

== Alpina versions ==
Alpina produced a high compression (10.8:1) version of the M60B40 for the BMW Alpina B10 4.0 (based on the E34 5 Series) and the B11 4.0 (based on the E32 7 Series) and in some B8 4.0 models (based on the E36 3 Series) produced for the Japanese market. The M60 engine produced 234 kW (314 bhp) in the B10 4.0.

BMW Alpina engine

Layout
- Configuration: 90° V8
- Displacement: 4.0 L (3,981 cc); 4.6 L (4,619 cc)
- Cylinder bore: 89 mm (3.50 in); 93 mm (3.66 in)
- Piston stroke: 80 mm (3.15 in); 85 mm (3.35 in)
- Valvetrain: DOHC 32 valve

Combustion
- Fuel system: Normally aspirated
- Fuel type: Petrol

Chronology
- Predecessor: None

The engine's displacement was later enlarged to 4,619 cc (281.9 cu in) for use in the B8 4.6 and B10 4.6. The power output is 253 kW (339 bhp) in the B10 4.6 and 248 kW (333 bhp) in the B8 4.6.

== Nikasil damage from high-sulfur fuels ==
The M60 uses Nikasil- an alloy containing aluminium, nickel and silicon alloy- to line the cylinders bores. In fuels with high sulfur content (such as used fuels sold at the time in the United States, United Kingdom and South America), the sulfur damages the Nikasil bore lining, causing the engine to lose compression. In the U.S. and U.K., sulfur rich fuel is being phased out.

BMW replaced engines under warranty and Nikasil was eventually replaced by Alusil.

Nikasil engines are unlikely to be a problem today, as cars with affected engines are off the road or have received replacement engines.

== See also ==
- BMW
- List of BMW engines
