= BMW M62 =

BMW M62 engine
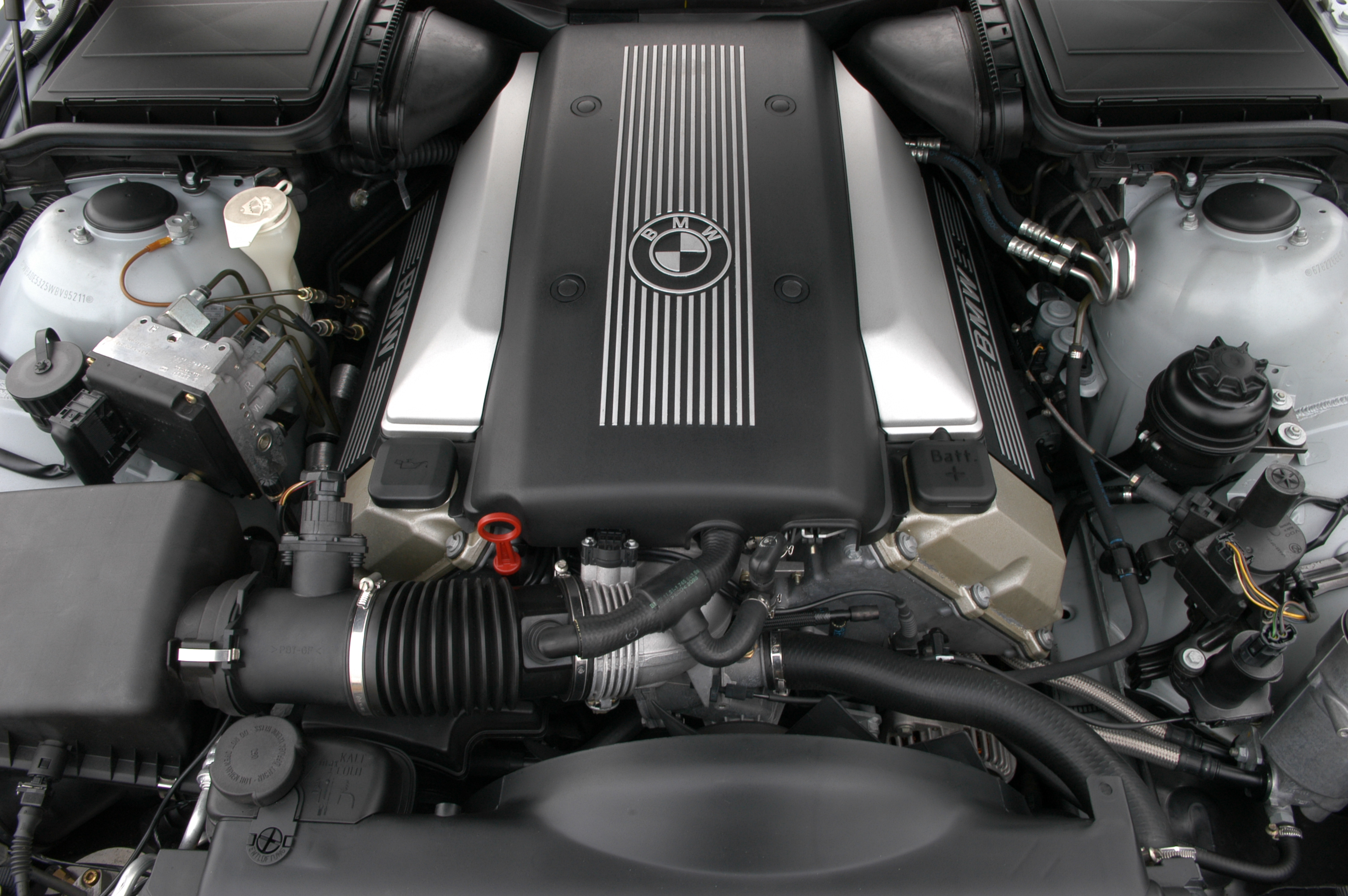

Overview
- Production: 1995–2005

Layout
- Configuration: 90° V8
- Displacement: 3.5 L (3,498 cc); 4.4 L (4,398 cc); 4.6 L (4,619 cc); 4.8 L (4,837 cc)
- Cylinder bore: 84 mm (3.31 in); 92 mm (3.62 in); 93 mm (3.66 in)
- Piston stroke: 78.9 mm (3.11 in); 82.7 mm (3.26 in); 85 mm (3.35 in); 89 mm (3.50 in)
- Cylinder block material: Aluminium
- Cylinder head material: Aluminium
- Valvetrain: DOHC, with VVT on M62TU versions
- Valvetrain drive system: Chain

Combustion
- Fuel type: Petrol

Chronology
- Predecessor: BMW M60
- Successor: BMW N62

BMW M62 is a naturally aspirated V8 petrol engine which was produced from 1995 to 2005. A successor to the BMW M60, the M62 features an aluminium engine block and a single row timing chain.

In 1998, a technical update included VANOS (variable valve timing) for the intake camshafts.

A BMW M high performance version of the M62, called the S62 engine, was fitted to BMW's E39 M5 and BMW Z8, and both the Ascari KZ1 and Ascari A10.

== Design ==
Like the BMW M60 engine it replaced, the M62 is a DOHC engine with four valves per cylinder, an aluminum block and aluminum heads. The M62 has fracture-split forged connecting rods, hypereutectic pistons with ferrous coated side skirts. Most of the M62 engines used Alusil for the block material, however some early M62 engines used Nikasil cylinder coating instead.

Alusil technology integrates silicon throughout the aluminum cast so that liners or treated bores within this block family are not needed.

The M62 uses a Bosch Motronic 5.2 engine control unit (also called "DME") and a hot wire MAF.

=== Technical Update ===
In 1998, a "Technical Update" was applied to the M62, resulting in the M62TU variants. New features include single-VANOS (variable valve timing for the intake camshaft) and electronic throttle control. The engine management was updated to Motronic ME7.2.

== Versions ==
Figures specified are for European models.

Version	Displacement	Power	Torque	Redline	Year
M62B35	3,498 cc	173 kW (232 hp) at 5,700 rpm	320 N⋅m (236 lb⋅ft) at 3,300 rpm	6,200	1996
M62TUB35	3,498 cc	180 kW (241 hp) at 5,800 rpm (Note: 175 kW (235 hp) for E38 7 Series models)	345 N⋅m (254 lb⋅ft) at 3,800 rpm	6,200	1998
M62B44	4,398 cc	210 kW (282 hp) at 5,700 rpm	420 N⋅m (310 lb⋅ft) at 3,900 rpm	6,100	1996
M62TUB44	4,398 cc	210 kW (280 hp) at 5,400 rpm (Note: 216 kW (290 hp) for 2001-2003 540i models sold in the U.S.)	440 N⋅m (325 lb⋅ft) at 3,600 rpm	6,100	1998
M62TUB46	4,619 cc	255 kW (342 hp) at 5,700 rpm	480 N⋅m (354 lb⋅ft) at 3,700 rpm	6,500	2001
Alpina F3	4,619 cc	250 kW (335 hp) at 6,000 rpm	470 N⋅m (347 lb⋅ft) at 3,700 rpm	6,500	1996
Alpina F4	4,619 cc	255 kW (342 hp) at 6,000 rpm	480 N⋅m (354 lb⋅ft) at 3,700 rpm	6,500	2000
Alpina F5	4,837 cc	276 kW (370 hp) at 6,000 rpm	510 N⋅m (376 lb⋅ft) at 3,700 rpm	6,500	2002
S62B50	4,941 cc	294 kW (394 hp) at 6,600 rpm	500 N⋅m (369 lb⋅ft) at 3,800 rpm	7,000	1998
Racing Dynamics R52	5,161 cc	306 kW (410 hp) at 6,400 rpm	514 N⋅m (379 lb⋅ft) at 3,900 rpm	7,200	2001

=== M62B35 ===
The M62B35 has a bore of 84 mm (3.3 in) and a stroke of 78.9 mm (3.1 in).

Applications:

- 1996–1998 BMW 5 Series (E39) 535i
- 1996–1998 BMW 7 Series (E38) 735i/735iL

=== M62TUB35 ===
In 1998, the Technical Update was applied, resulting in the M62TUB35. Versions used in the E39 5 Series application have slightly more power than versions used in the E38 7 Series.

Applications:

- 1998–2001 BMW 7 Series (E38) 735i/735iL - 175 kW (235 hp)
- 1998–2003 BMW 5 Series (E39) 535i - 180 kW (241 hp)

=== M62B44 ===
The M62B44 has a bore of 92 mm (3.6 in) and a stroke of 82.7 mm (3.26 in).

Applications:

- 1996–1998 BMW 5 Series (E39) 540i
- 1996–1998 BMW 7 Series (E38) 740i/740iL
- 1997–1999 BMW 8 Series (E31) 840Ci

=== M62TUB44 ===
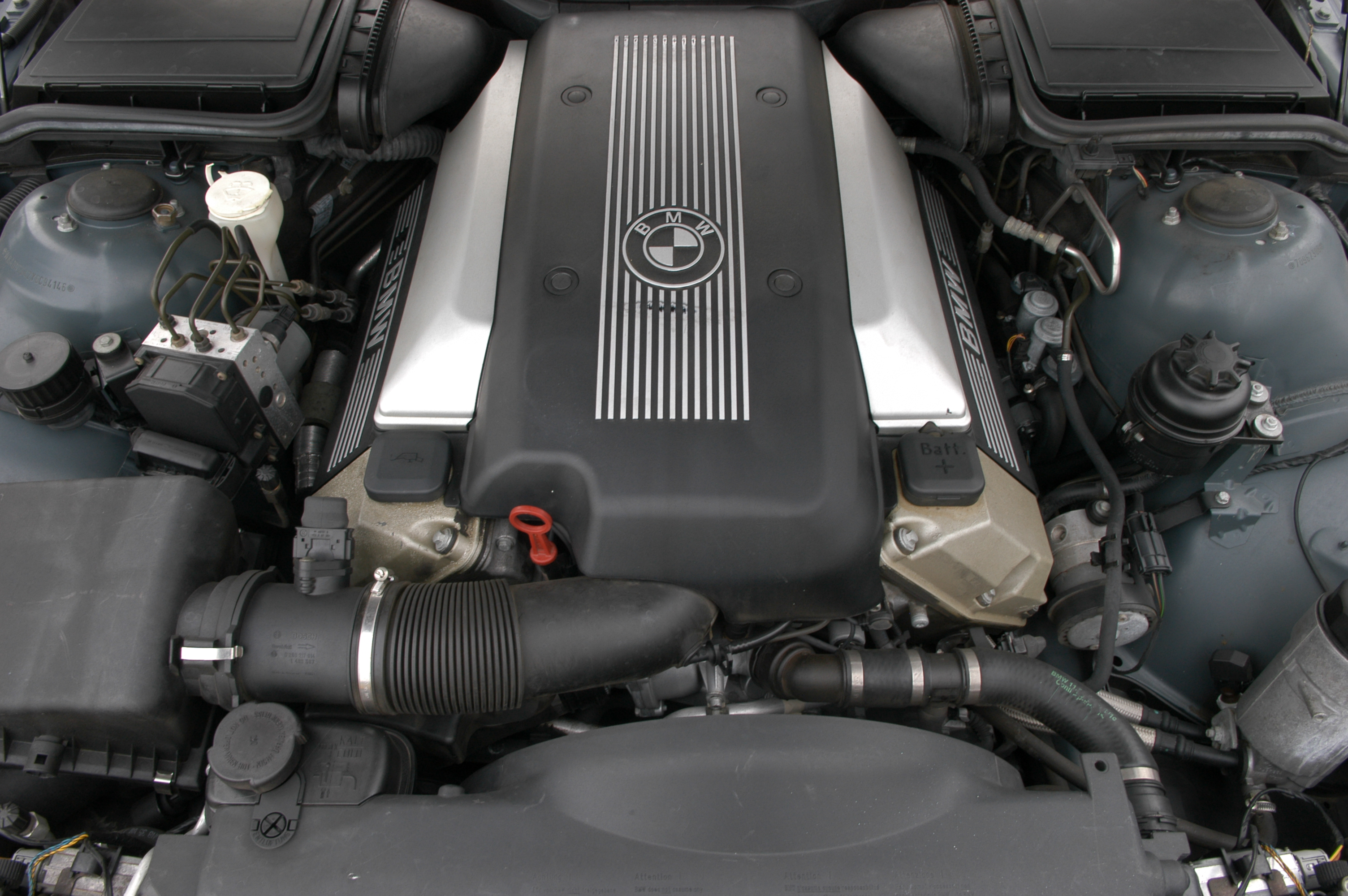
Technical Update version (M62TUB44)

In 1998, the Technical Update was applied, resulting in the M62TUB44. In the United States, power for TU models was increased to 216 kW (290 hp).

Applications:

- 1998–2003 BMW 5 Series (E39) 540i
- 1999–2001 BMW 7 Series (E38) 740i/740iL
- 1999–2003 BMW X5 (E53) X5 4.4i
- 2000–2004 Morgan Aero 8
- 2002–2005 Range Rover

=== M62TUB46 ===
The M62TUB46 is based on the M62TUB44. Revisions include full metal vanos hubs. 10.5mm lift intake and exhaust camshafts. Stronger valve springs. Bore of 93 mm (3.7 in) and stroke of 85 mm (3.3 in). Underdriven crank shaft drive pulley. Two-piece oil scraper ring instead of three-pieces. 93 mm pistons with reduced height due to the increased stroke.

Applications:

- 1999–2001 Alpina B10 V8
- 2000–2004 Morgan Aero 8 GTN
- 2002–2004 BMW X5 (E53) X5 4.6is

=== Alpina F3 ===
The Alpina F3 was developed by Alpina and based on the M62B44 engine. Released late in 1996 it used a modified M62B44 block supplied to Alpina from BMW featuring a bore of 93mm. It also featured a modified cylinder head, different intake camshafts, a crankshaft with increased stroke along with different pistons, a different air intake manifold and exhaust manifolds as well as custom engine programming. It has a bore of 93 mm (3.7 in) and a stroke of 85 mm (3.3 in).

Applications:

- 1996-1998 Alpina B10 V8

=== Alpina F4 ===
Following with updates to the regular production M62B44 the F4 was a revised version of the Alpina F3 engine and featured variable valve timing on the intake camshafts, an electronically controlled throttle body and a slight increase in power. The Alpina F4 received a revision into the F4/1 in late 2000 which slightly increased fuel efficiency while decreasing its emissions output although power output remained the same. It has a bore of 93 mm (3.7 in) and a stroke of 85 mm (3.3 in).

Applications:

- 1998-2000 Alpina B10 V8
- 2000-2002 Alpina B10 V8/1

=== Alpina F5 ===
The F5 was Alpina's final iteration of the M62B44 engine, it featured all the same technology as the F4/1 but with an increased displacement due to an increased stroke thanks to a modified crankshaft. The increased stroke necessitated an oil pan with additional clearance as well as revised intake camshafts and exhaust camshafts from the M62B46 production engine. It has a bore of 93 mm (3.7 in) and a stroke of 89 mm (3.5 in).

Applications:

- 2002-2004 Alpina B10 V8S
- 2002-2003 Alpina Roadster V8

=== Racing Dynamics R52 ===
Based on the production M62B44 the Racing Dynamics R52 engine featured a billet crankshaft, special pistons with stock connecting rods and a modified cylinder head which work together to raise the compression ratio to 11.3:1. It also features custom tubular exhaust manifolds, different camshafts and a modified engine computer which lets the engine spin to its 7,200 rpm redline. It has a bore of 94 mm (3.7 in) and a stroke of 93.0 mm (3.7 in).

Applications:

- 1999-2001 Racing Dynamics R52 Sport

== S62 ==
BMW S62 Engine
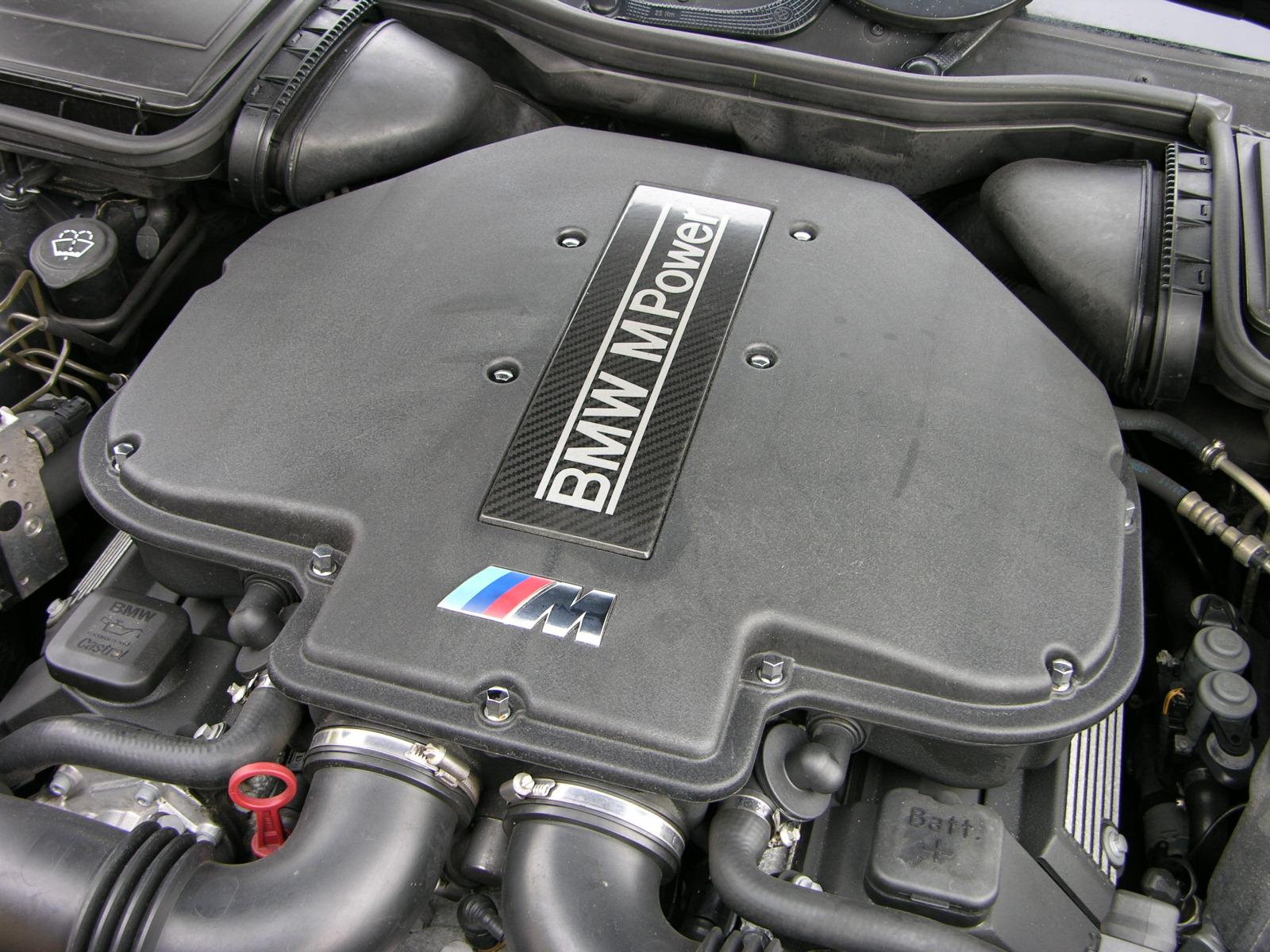

Overview
- Production: 1998–2003

Layout
- Configuration: 90° V8
- Displacement: 4.9 L (4,941 cc)
- Cylinder bore: 94 mm (3.7 in)
- Piston stroke: 89 mm (3.50 in)
- Cylinder block material: Aluminium
- Cylinder head material: Aluminium
- Valvetrain: DOHC w/ VVT
- Compression ratio: 11.0:1

Combustion
- Fuel system: Manifold injection
- Fuel type: Petrol
- Oil system: Dry sump

Output
- Power output: 294–466 kW (400–634 PS; 394–625 hp)
- Torque output: 500–600 N⋅m (369–443 lb⋅ft)

Chronology
- Successor: BMW S85

The BMW S62 engine (full model code S62B50) is the high-performance variant of the M62, which is fitted to the E39 M5 and the E52 Z8. The S62 was BMW's first V8 engine to have double-VANOS (variable valve timing on the intake and exhaust camshafts).

The S62 engine produces 294 kW (400 PS; 394 hp) at 6600 rpm and 500 N⋅m (369 lb⋅ft) at 3800 rpm. The redline is 7000 rpm. The bore and stroke are 94 mm (3.7 in) and 89 mm (3.5 in) respectively. This results in a displacement of 4,941 cc (301.5 cu in), compared with the 4,398 cc (268.4 cu in) of the largest M62 engine at the time.

Other differences compared to the M62 include:

- Individual throttle bodies for each of the eight cylinders, which are electronically actuated and have driver-selectable "normal" and "sport" mode throttle response.
- Compression ratio is 11.0:1, compared with 10.0:1 for the M62
- A double-row timing chain, compared with the single-row chain used by the M62
- Hollow camshafts.
- Engine control unit is a Siemens MSS 52
- Dual air intakes and mass flow sensors
- A semi-dry sump oil system, consisting of two additional scavenging pumps which activates during hard cornering

Like the M62, the S62 has an aluminium block and head. The S62 was assembled at BMW's Dingolfing plant.

Applications:

- 1998–2003 BMW M5 (E39)
- 2000–2003 BMW Z8
- 2005–2010 Ascari KZ1
- 2006 Ascari A10

== Bentley Arnage ==
The 1998-2000 Bentley Arnage (Green Label) is powered by a Cosworth-developed twin-turbo version of the M62B44. This engine produces 260 kW (349 hp) and 569 N⋅m (420 lb⋅ft).
