= BMW 8 Series (E31) =

BMW luxury grand tourer

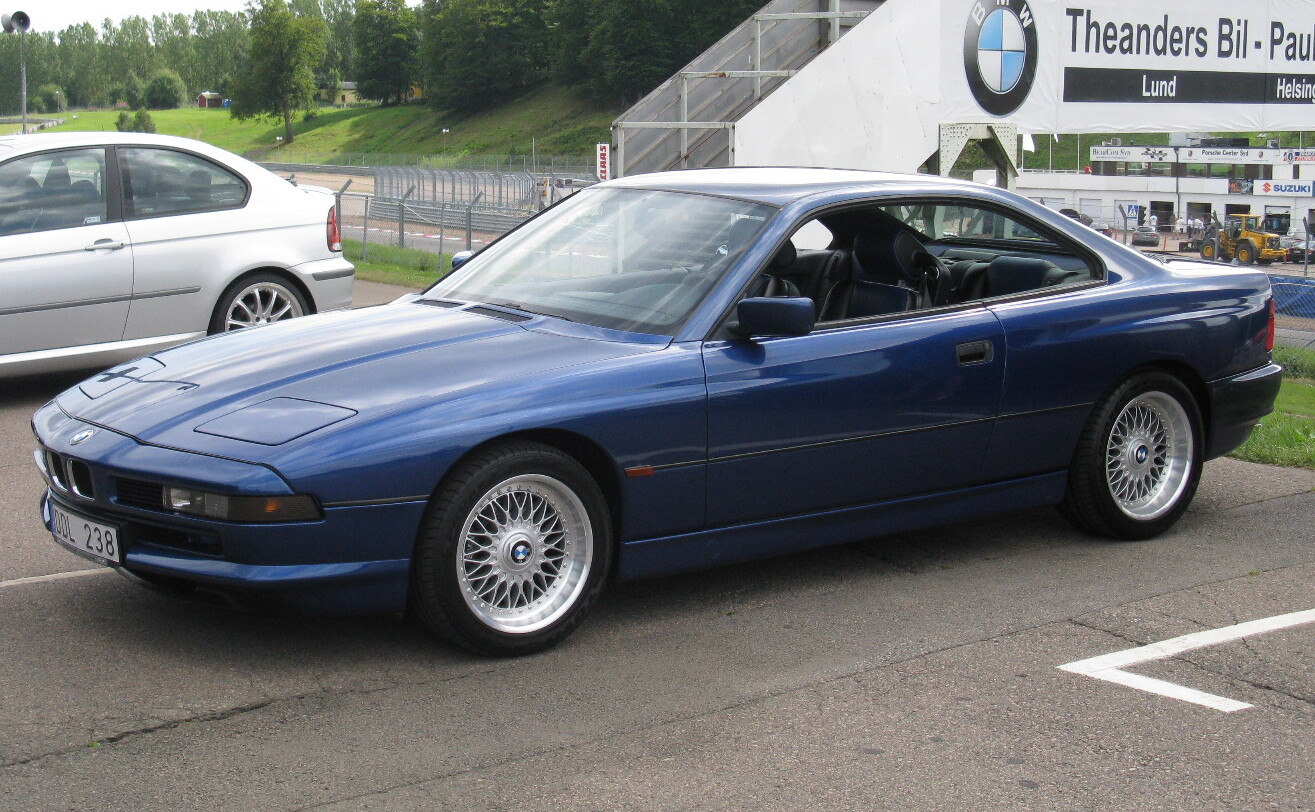

Overview
- Manufacturer: BMW
- Production: February 1990 – May 1999
- Assembly: Germany: Dingolfing; South Africa: Rosslyn, Pretoria (BMW South Africa)
- Designer: Klaus Kapitza (1986)

Body and chassis
- Class: Grand tourer (S)
- Body style: 2-door coupé
- Layout: Front-engine, rear-wheel-drive

Powertrain
- Engine: Petrol: 4.0 L M60B40 V8; 4.4 L M62B44 V8; 5.0 L M70B50 V12; 5.4 L M73B54 V12; 5.6 L S70B56 V12
- Transmission: 5-speed automatic Getrag ZF 5HP24 (V8); 4-speed automatic Getrag ZF 4HP24 (V12); 5-speed automatic Getrag ZF 5HP30 (V12); 6-speed manual Getrag 420G (V8); 6-speed manual Getrag 560G (V12)

Dimensions
- Wheelbase: 2,685 mm (105.7 in)
- Length: 4,780 mm (188.2 in)
- Width: 1,854 mm (73.0 in)
- Height: 1,330–1,341 mm (52.4–52.8 in)
- Curb weight: 1,855–1,975 kg (4,090–4,354 lb)

Chronology
- Successor: BMW 8 Series (G15)

The BMW E31 is the first generation of the BMW 8 Series. It is a grand tourer built by BMW from 1990 to 1999 as a 2-door coupé, powered by either a V8 or V12 engine. Whilst it did supplant the original E24 based 6 Series in 1990, it was not a direct successor, but a new model class with a substantially higher price and performance than the 6 Series.

== Development ==
Development of the 8 Series began in July 1981, with the design phase reaching completion in 1986, although the launch was delayed due to still-strong 6 Series sales. The 8 Series debuted at the Frankfurt Motor Show (IAA) in early September 1989. The 8 Series was designed to move beyond the market of the original 6 Series, with substantially improved performance, as well as a higher price.

Over 1.5 billion Deutsche Marks were spent on total development ($1.13 billion USD or €990 million in 2025). BMW used CAD tools, still unusual at the time, to design the car's all-new body. Combined with wind tunnel testing, the resulting car had a drag coefficient of Cd=0.29, a major improvement from the previous BMW M6/635CSi's 0.39.

Eighteen prototypes for an 830i were built, but the trim level was not put into full-scale production. The V8-powered 840ci would later serve as the 8 Series' entry-level model. The 850i offered the first V12 engine mated to a 6-speed manual transmission on a road car. It was one of the first vehicles to be fitted with an electronic drive-by-wire throttle. Together with the Z1, the 8 series was one of BMW's first cars to use a multi-link rear axle.

CAD modelling allowed the 8 Series unibody to be 3 kg (6.6 lb) lighter than that of the 6 Series (E24). However, the production 8 Series was significantly heavier when completed due to the large engine and added luxury items—a source of criticism from those who wanted BMW to concentrate on the driving experience. Some of the car's weight may have been due to its pillar-less "hardtop" body style which lacked a "B" pillar.

== Sales ==
Sales of the 8 Series were affected by the global recession of the early 1990s, the Persian Gulf War, and energy price spikes. As a result, plans for the high performance M8 variant were dropped in 1991.

BMW pulled the 8 Series from the North American market in 1997, having sold 6,920 cars. BMW continued production for other markets until 1999 having sold 30,609 in all markets. The base price for an entry-level 8 series in the early 1990s started in the US$70,000 range, which is US$172,504 in 2025.

== Models ==
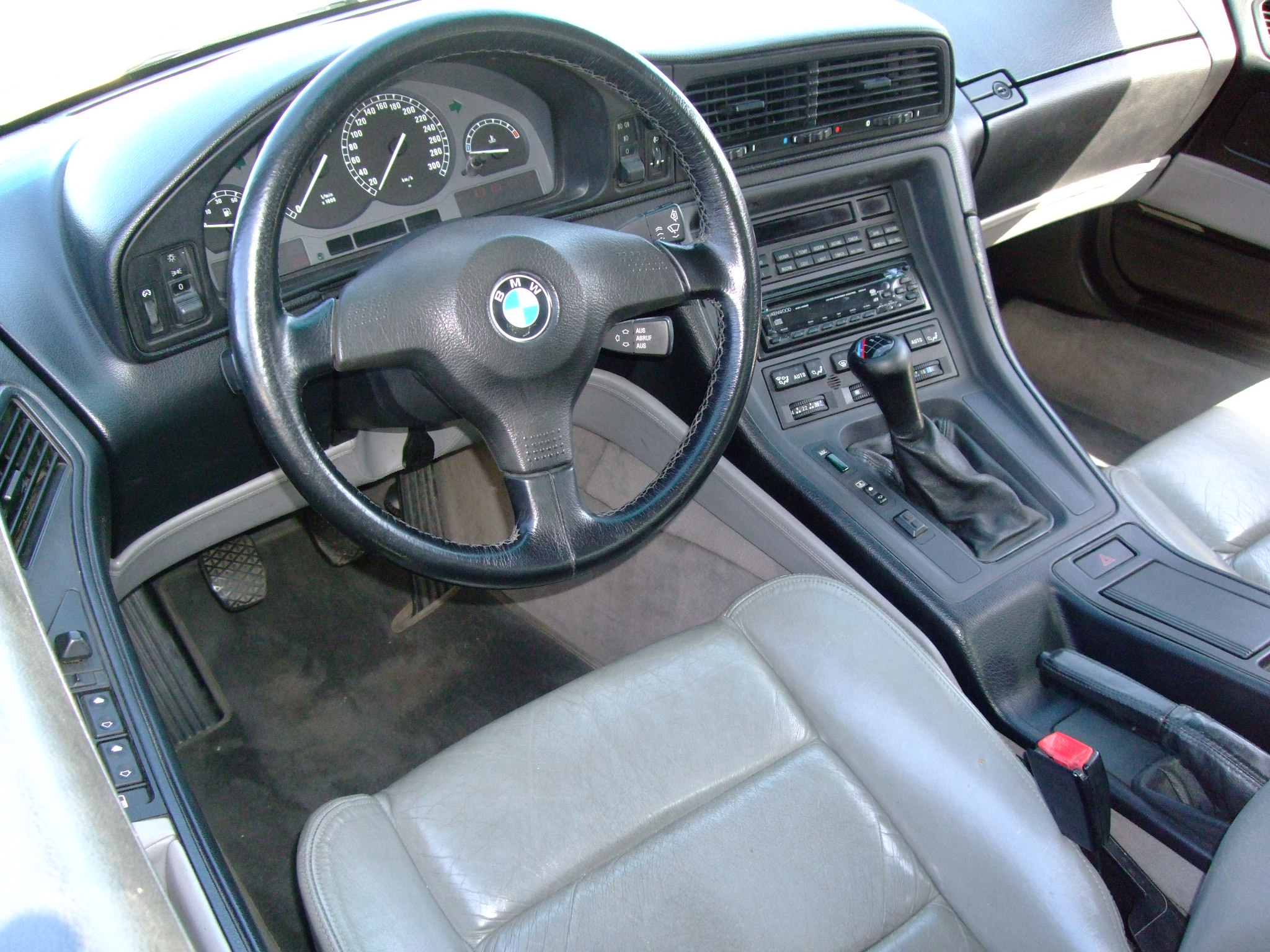
Interior (850i manual)

The production totals for each model are:

- 840Ci with the M60 engine: 4,728
- 840Ci with the M62 engine: 3,075
- 850i / 850Ci with the M70 engine: 20,072
- 850Ci with the M73 engine: 1,218
- 850CSi with the S70 engine: 1,510

=== 840Ci ===
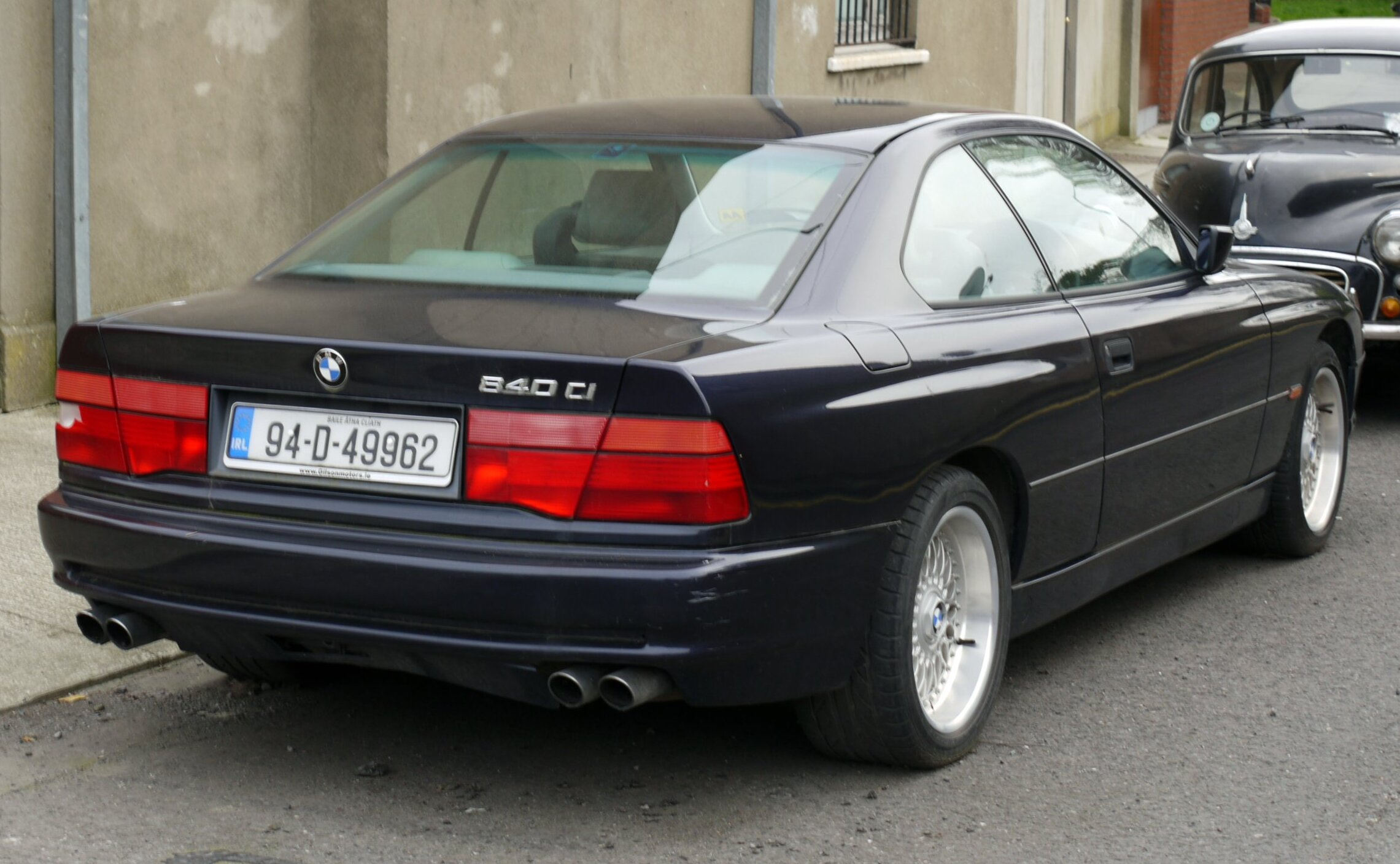
840Ci rear

840Ci front

The 840Ci was offered with two different engines. The first gen car used the 4.0-litre M60B40 V8 engine having a power output of 210 kW (286 PS) and was produced from mid-1993 to late 1995. From mid-1995, production phased in the newer 4.4-litre M62B44 V8 engine, which had better fuel economy and more torque, though power output remained unchanged.

The 840Ci was available with a 5-speed automatic transmission, though European cars were given the option of a 6-speed manual transmission. The only external features distinguishing the V8 model from the V12 models were the quad round exhausts, which were square in the V12 models. The 840Ci stayed in production until May 1999.

The 840Ci was also offered a M Sport Aero Package (also known as the M Aerodynamics Package). This package changed the front and rear bumper look, and added side sills. The package also included M Sport Multifunction steering wheel, an upgraded Suspension system and M Mirrors, which are more aerodynamic than the blocky traditional mirrors. The M sport Aero Package was more common on the facelifted BMW 840Ci. The package was usually part of the M Sport Individual Package.

=== 850i/Ci ===
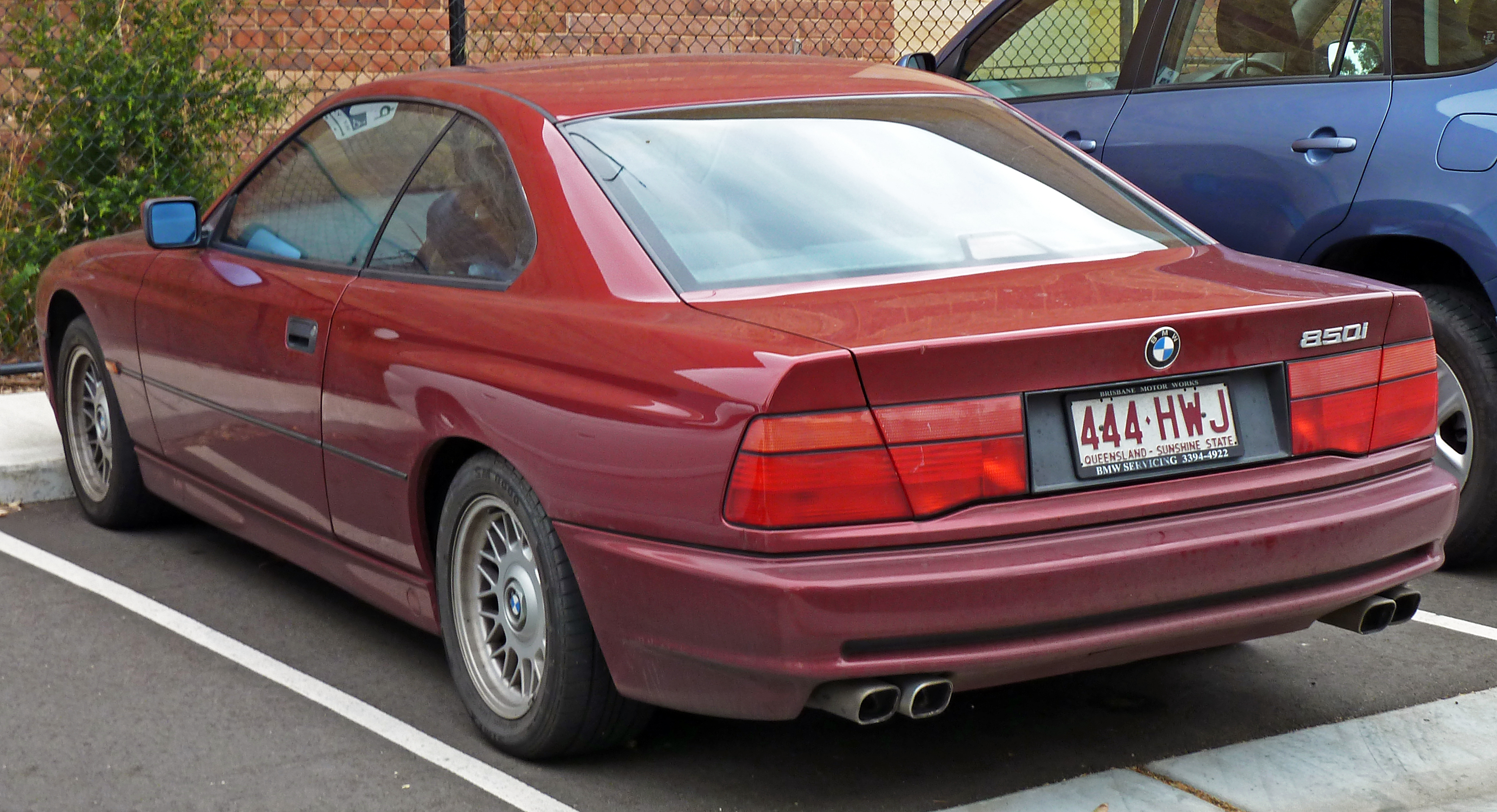
850i, rear view (showing square quad exhaust tips)

The 850i was the first model of the 8 Series launched in 1990 with the 5.0-litre M70B50 V12 engine having a power output of 220 kW (300 PS). It was available with either a 4-speed automatic or a 6-speed manual gearbox.

Around the time of the introduction of the 840Ci in Autumn 1993, the 850i was renamed the 850Ci. From October 1994, BMW installed the new M73B54 V12 engine in the 850Ci, the new engine being from the newly launched E38 750i. Thus, cars with 850Ci badging used both the M70 and M73 engines, with those built before 10/94 using the older E32-type M70. As the displacement of the M73 increased to 5.4-litres and the compression ratio went up, the power output increased to 240 kW (326 PS).

=== 850CSi ===
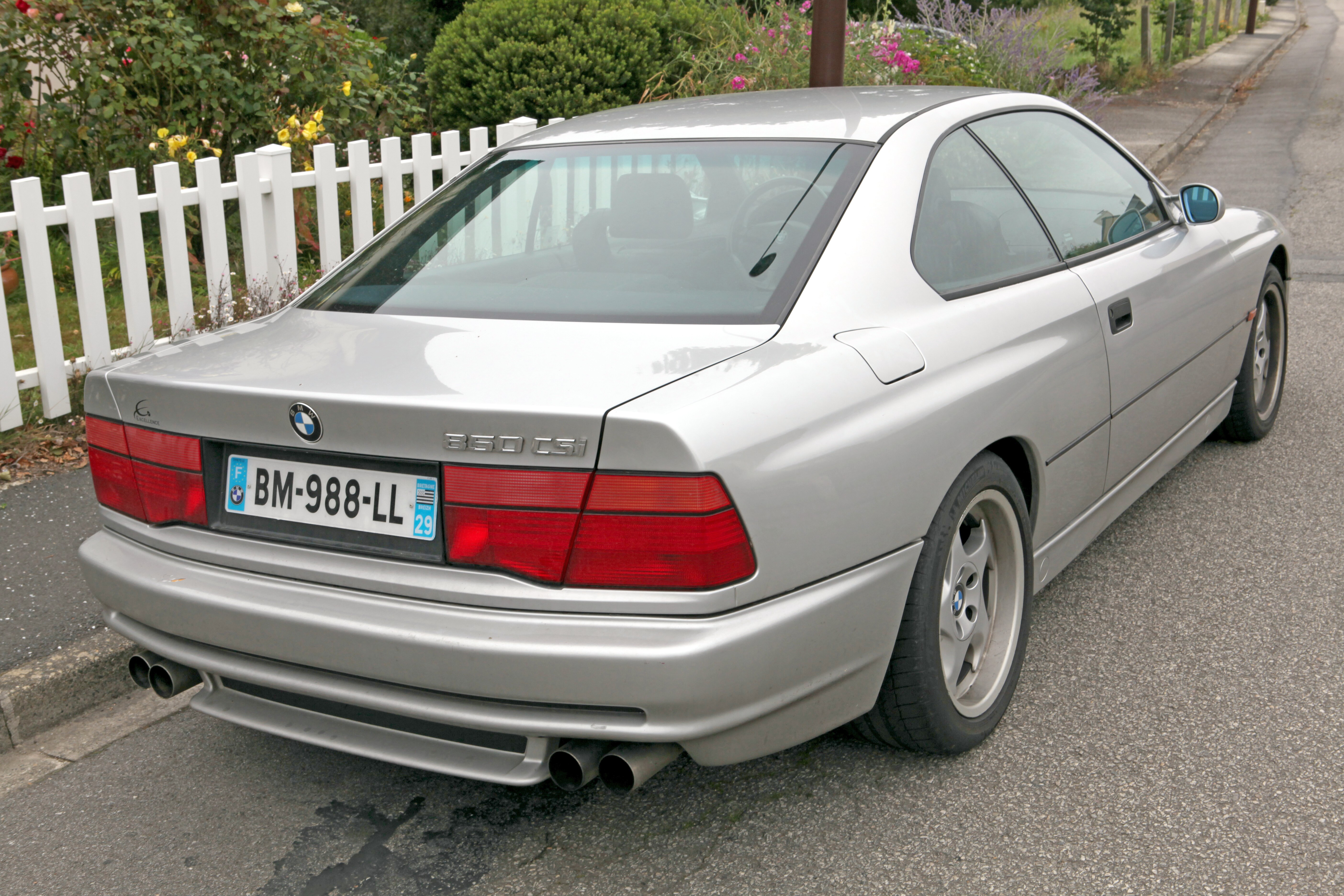
850CSi rear (with revised rear bumper)

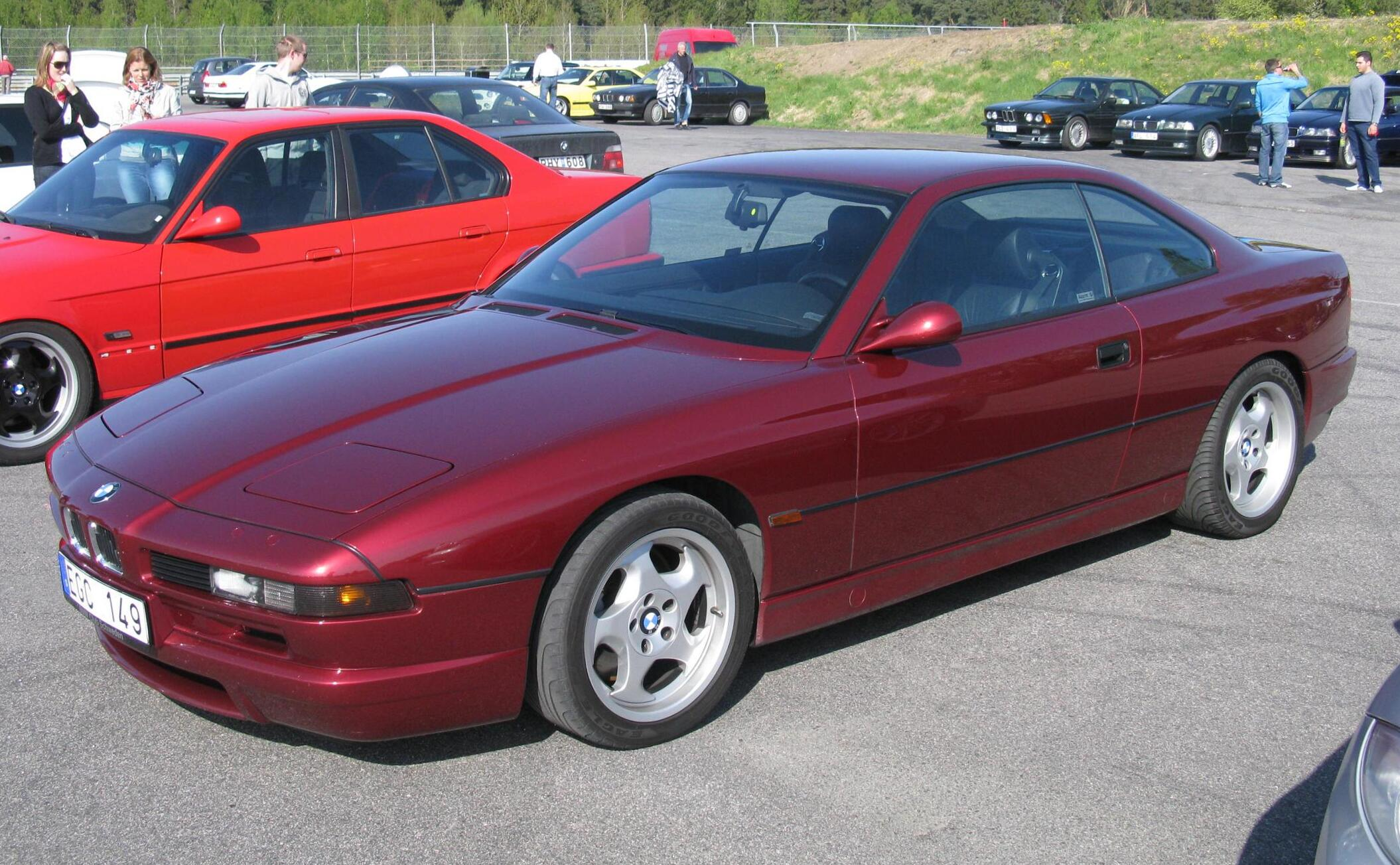
850CSi front (with revised front bumper and wing mirrors)

As a top-of-the-range variant of the 8 Series, the 850CSi took over from the prototype M8 variant. The 850CSi used the same engine as the 850i, which was tuned so significantly that BMW assigned it a new engine code: S70B56. The modifications included Bosch Motronic 1.7 fuel injection, a capacity increase to 5,576 cc (5.6 L) and power increase to 280 kW (381 PS) at 5,300 rpm and 550 N⋅m (406 lbf⋅ft) of torque at 4,000 rpm. Road & Track recorded a 0–60 mph (0–97 km/h) time for the 850CSi of 5.9 seconds.

The 850CSi's modified suspension included stiffer springs and dampers that reduced the car's ride height. The recirculating ball steering ratio was dropped 15% over the standard E31 setup. The model also sported staggered throwing star wheels. The front and rear bumpers were reshaped for improved aerodynamic performance. Four round stainless steel exhaust tips replaced the square tips found on other models. The 6-speed manual gearbox was the only transmission option. In Europe, all 850CSi's came with four-wheel steering (AHK - Aktive Hinterachs-Kinematik, Active rear axle Kinematics), upgraded and ventilated brakes with floating front discs, rear differential oil cooler, engine oil cooler, two-tone interior, sports seats, and reshaped mirrors. In the United States, the cars instead received "BMW Motorsport" writing on the doorhandles.

Production ended in late 1996 because the S70 engine could not be modified to comply with new emission regulations without substantial re-engineering.

== Engines ==
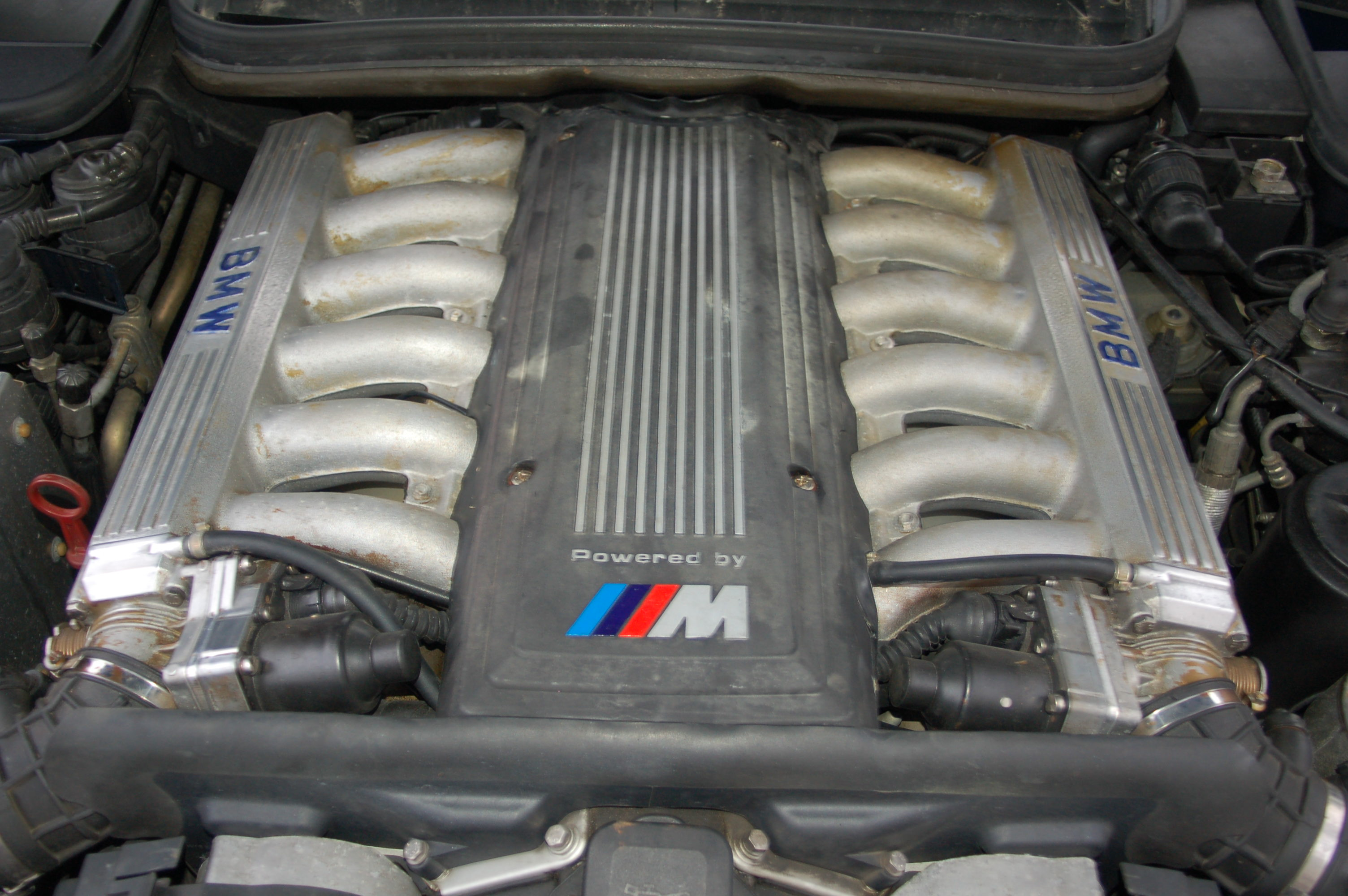
S70 V12 engine

Model	Years	Engine	Power	Torque	Manual	Automatic
840Ci	1992–96	4.0 L M60; V8 engine	210 kW (286 PS; 282 hp)	400 N⋅m (295 lbf⋅ft)	6-speed Getrag 420G (EU only)	5-speed Getrag ZF 5HP24
840Ci	1995–99	4.4 L M62; V8 engine	210 kW (286 PS; 282 hp)	420 N⋅m (310 lbf⋅ft)	6-speed Getrag 420G	5-speed Getrag ZF 5HP24
850i, 850Ci	1990–94	5.0 L M70; V12 engine	220 kW (300 PS; 296 hp)	450 N⋅m (332 lbf⋅ft)	6-speed manual Getrag 560G V12	4-speed Getrag ZF 4HP24
850Ci	1992–99	5.4 L M73; V12 engine	240 kW (326 PS; 322 hp)	490 N⋅m (361 lbf⋅ft)		5-speed Getrag ZF 5HP30
850CSi	1992–96	5.6 L S70; V12 engine	280 kW (381 PS; 375 hp)	550 N⋅m (406 lbf⋅ft)	6-speed manual Getrag 560G V12	

2017 United States Environmental Protection Agency estimates for cars equipped with automatic transmission:

- 840Ci:

Fuel type: Premium
city: 14 miles per US gallon (17 L/100 km; 17 mpg_{‑imp})
highway: 19 miles per US gallon (12 L/100 km; 23 mpg_{‑imp})
combined: 15 miles per US gallon (16 L/100 km; 18 mpg_{‑imp})

- 850Ci:

Fuel type: Premium
city: 12 miles per US gallon (20 L/100 km; 14 mpg_{‑imp})
highway: 19 miles per US gallon (12 L/100 km; 23 mpg_{‑imp})
combined: 15 miles per US gallon (16 L/100 km; 18 mpg_{‑imp})

== Transmissions ==
The 840Ci (4.0/4.4 L V8) models were equipped with a 5-speed automatic transmission or a 6-speed manual transmission. The 850i/850Ci (V12) models each use either a 4-speed automatic transmission or a 6-speed manual transmission, a 5-speed automatic transmission was fitted from mid-1994. The high performance 850CSi model only came with a 6-speed manual transmission.

== Prototype models ==
=== 830i ===
The 830i was a proposed variant that did not reach production. As the potential entry-level model, the 830i was to use the 3-litre V8 with 160 kW (215 hp) from the 530i and 730i, known internally as the M60B30. Eighteen cars were produced, thirteen of which had an automatic gearbox fitted. The model was dropped in favour of the 840Ci and almost all of the 18 cars were dismantled; one car is in a BMW museum.

=== 850i Cabrio ===
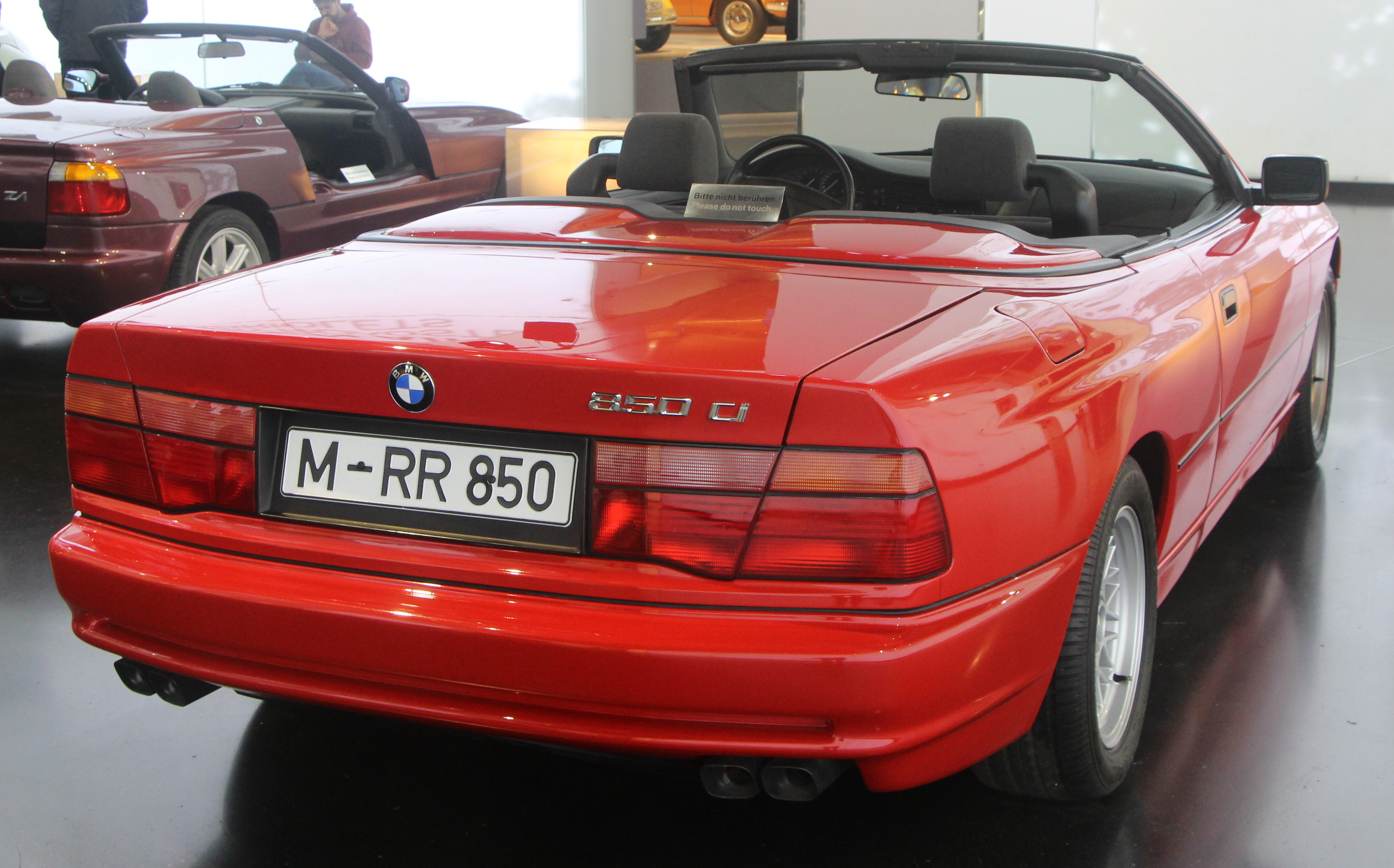
850i Cabrio Prototype, as seen in the BMW Museum

The 8 Series had been planned from the start with a convertible version in mind. Although the 850i Cabrio was developed to production readiness, it never went into production. At a relatively late date it was decided that this model was unlikely to recover the cost of putting it into production. A prototype in red resides in the BMW Museum in Munich. Although an official convertible variant never entered production, there have been aftermarket companies who have converted small numbers of 8 Series coupés into convertibles.

=== M8 ===
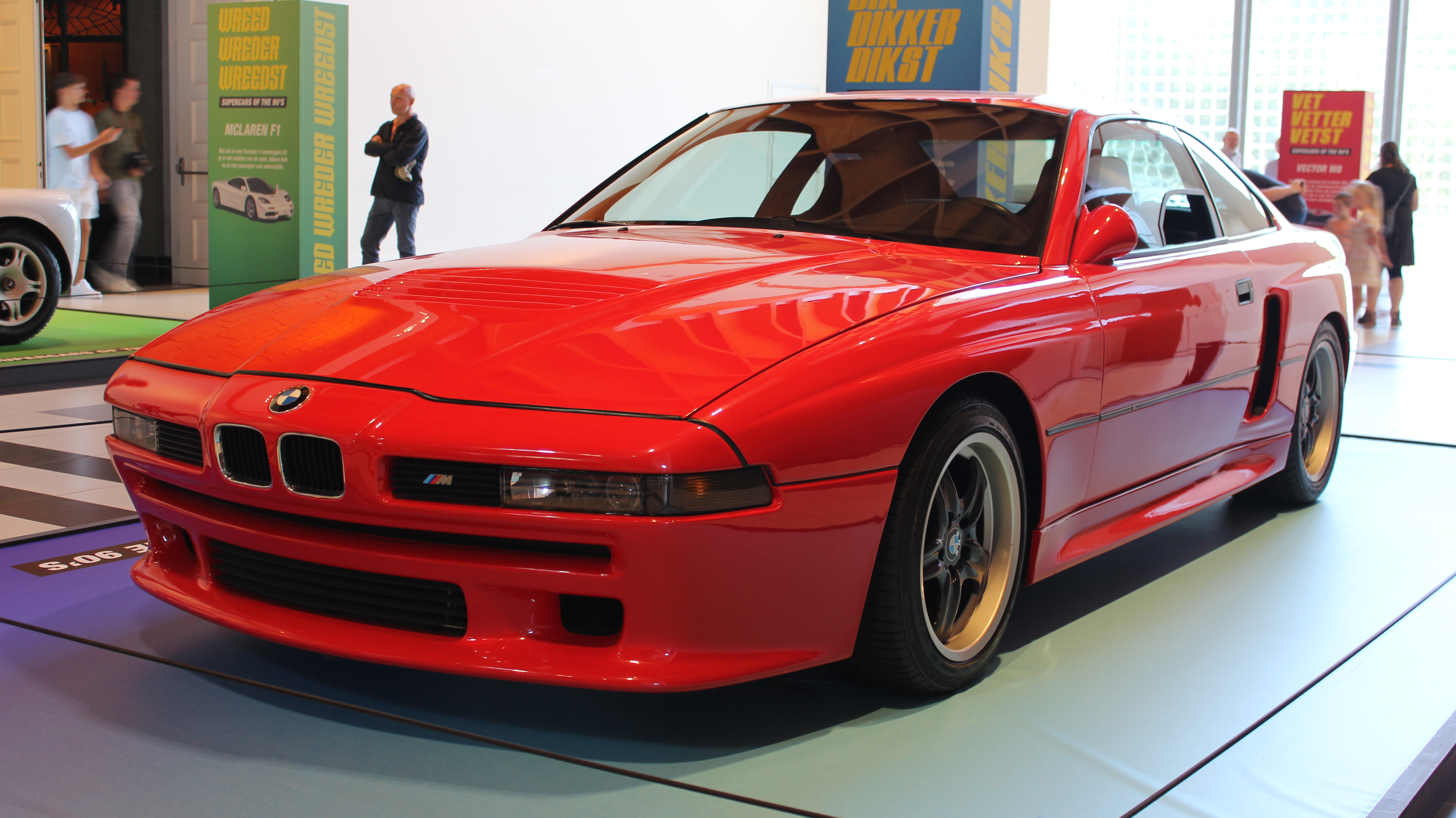
BMW M8

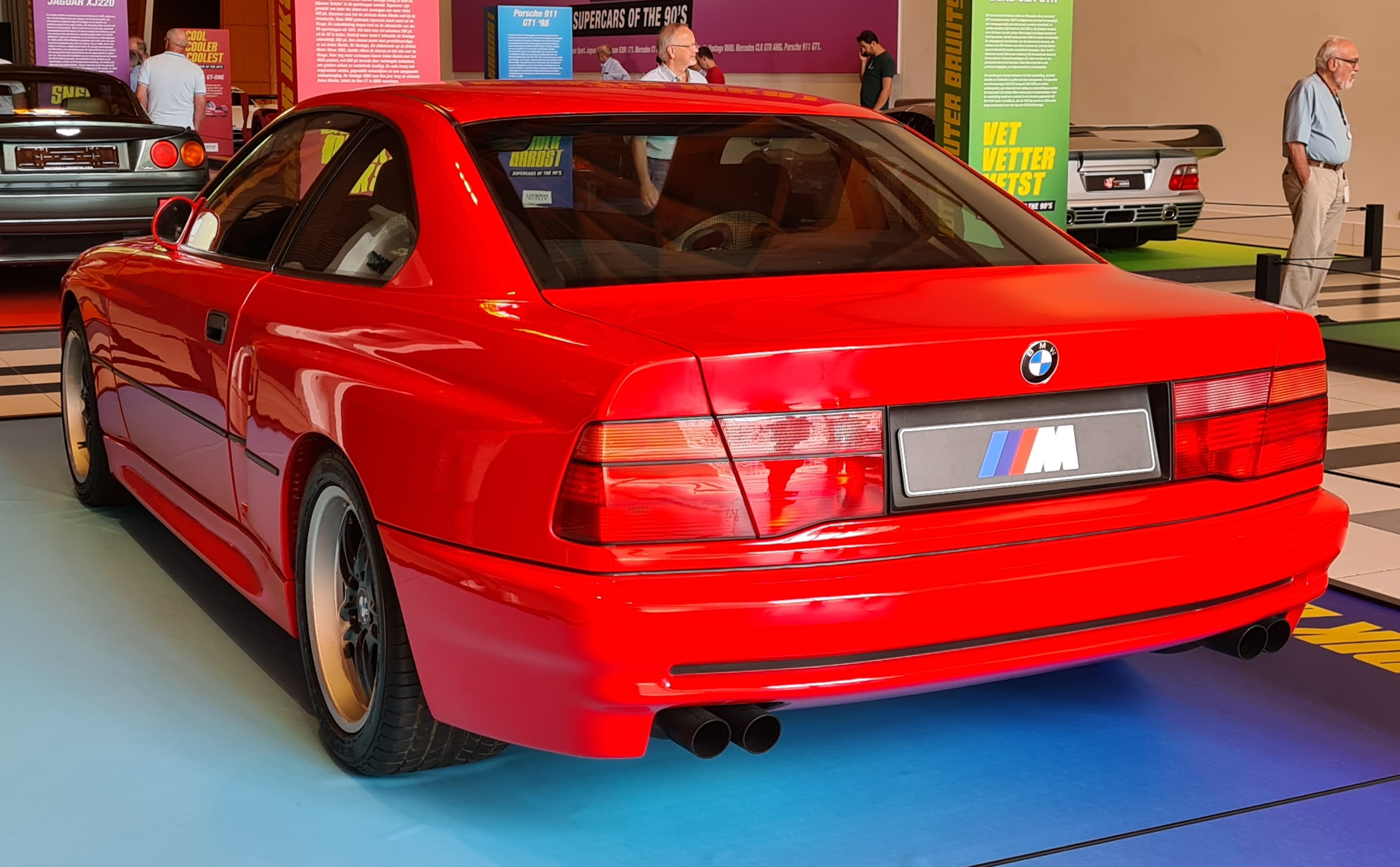
BMW M8 rear

The M8 was originally envisioned as a Ferrari competitor equipped with a special version of the S70 V12 engine, with modifications including a displacement increase to 6064 cc, dual overhead camshafts for each cylinder bank, individual throttle bodies with roller valves, four valves per cylinder, carbon fibre intake manifolds and continuously variable valve timing. As a result, it was estimated the M8 would achieve a top speed of 320 km/h (199 mph), with a power output of 471 kW (640 PS; 631 HP) and 650 N⋅m (479 lbf⋅ft) of torque. A common misconception is that this is the same engine that powered the McLaren F1. The S70/2 used in the McLaren F1 was not based on the prototype 48-valve V12 used in the M8, and was a completely new design.

The car was given two intakes by its rear arches for engine and differential oil cooling. It was also given a wider track via a wider drive axle as well as uprated front brakes. The interior was completely stripped, with bucket seats and additional gauges for oil pressure, oil temperature, and water temperature. The M8 was given a B-pillar to retain structural rigidity as well as having its pop up headlights deleted from the car.

Other modifications include bodywork modifications such as a new front bumper, new wing mirrors, more flared wheel arches and a vent in the bonnet. The car's kerb weight was reduced to less than 1,450 kg (3,200 lb) by making elements of the car glass reinforced plastic (such as the bonnet, doors and boot lid), using carbon fibre wheels and removing the rear seats from the car. The windows were made of Lexan. The oil reservoir was moved to the trunk of the car; oil pipes went through the roof of the car.

The project was eventually scrapped because BMW decided that there was no market for a high performance variant of the 8 Series primarily because of the on-going economic recession of the 1990s. The only prototype ever produced (one that was reportedly not even safe for normal road usage) was locked away by BMW in the company's Giftschrank (poison storage). BMW and the M Division had strongly denied that the car was even a possibility since the initial stages of its development. A world exclusive feature in the February 2010 issue of BMW Car Magazine, however, revealed that the M8 prototype still exists in its entirety. The car was unveiled to journalists for the first time on July 2, 2010, at the BMW Museum in Munich. The only public showing of the car happened on August 17, 2012, during 'The Legends of the Autobahn' car show held in Carmel, California. The car was specially shipped from Germany for the appearance.

Although the M8 was never produced, the 850CSi was also tuned by BMW's M division. Aside from sporting an M-tuned engine (as identified by the S prefix, which an M tuned engine would bear instead of the M prefix), the car's VIN identifies the car as being built by BMW Motorsport (a WBS prefix) instead of BMW AG (WBA prefix). Per BMW's own protocol, the 850CSi as marketed was essentially a de-tuned version of the putative M8.

== Alpina models ==
=== B12 5.0 ===
The B12 5.0 was built from 1990 to 1994 based on the BMW E31 850i with an Alpina-modified BMW M70 V12 (shared with the E32 B12 5.0) producing 257 kW (350 hp) and mated to an automatic transmission.

=== B12 5.7 ===
The B12 5.7 was available from 1992, based on the BMW 850CSi with the BMW S70B56 V12 engine bored out to 5.7 litres along with a modified intake, crankshaft, camshafts and a stainless steel exhaust system as well as a 6-speed manual gearbox. The modified engine produced 306 kW (416 hp). The carbon-fibre bonnet had cooling vents and a NACA duct for improved engine cooling. Performance figures included a 0–60 mph (0–97 km/h) acceleration time of 5.8 seconds and a top speed of 300 km/h (186 mph).

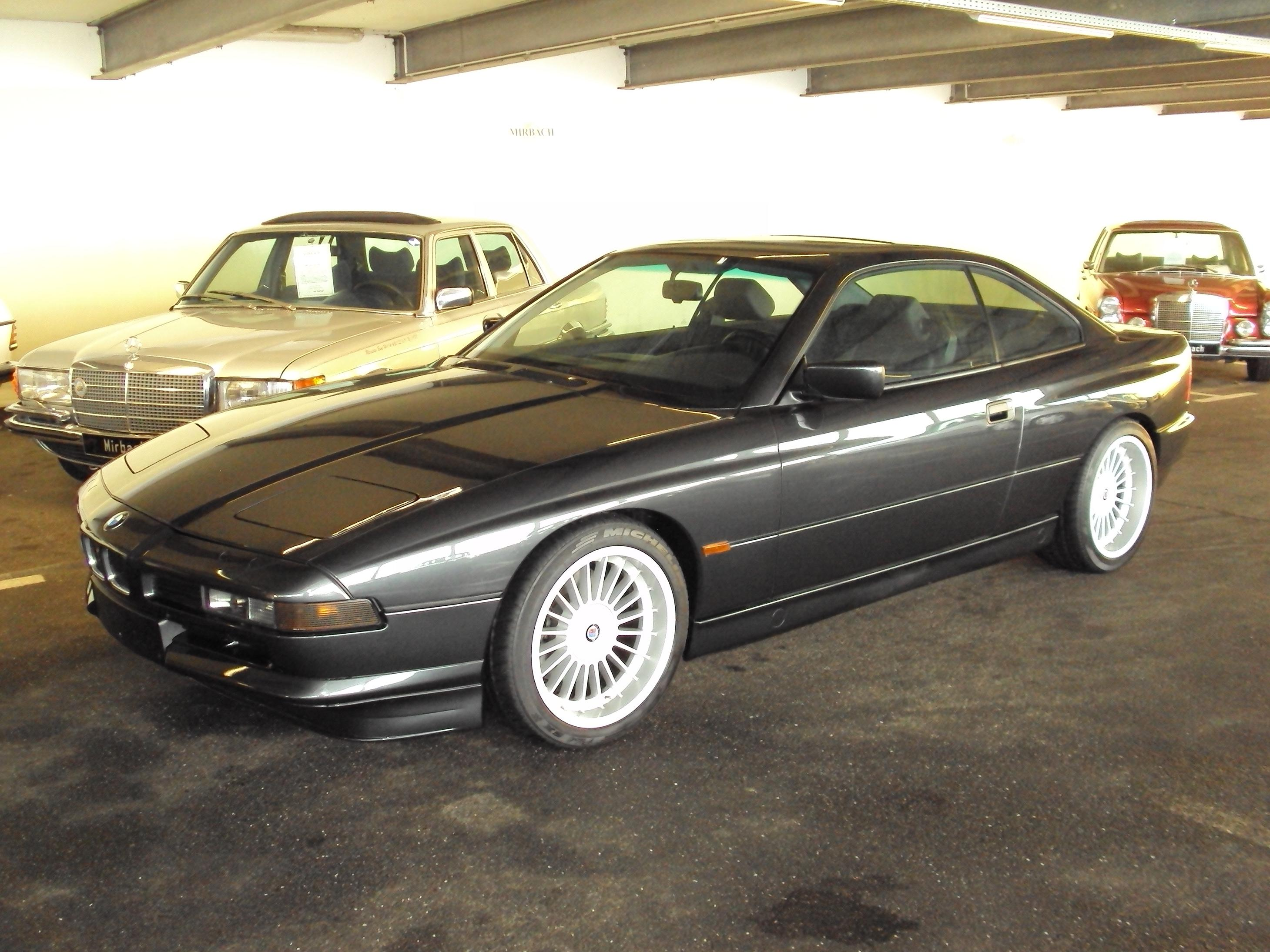
Alpina B12 5.0 Coupé

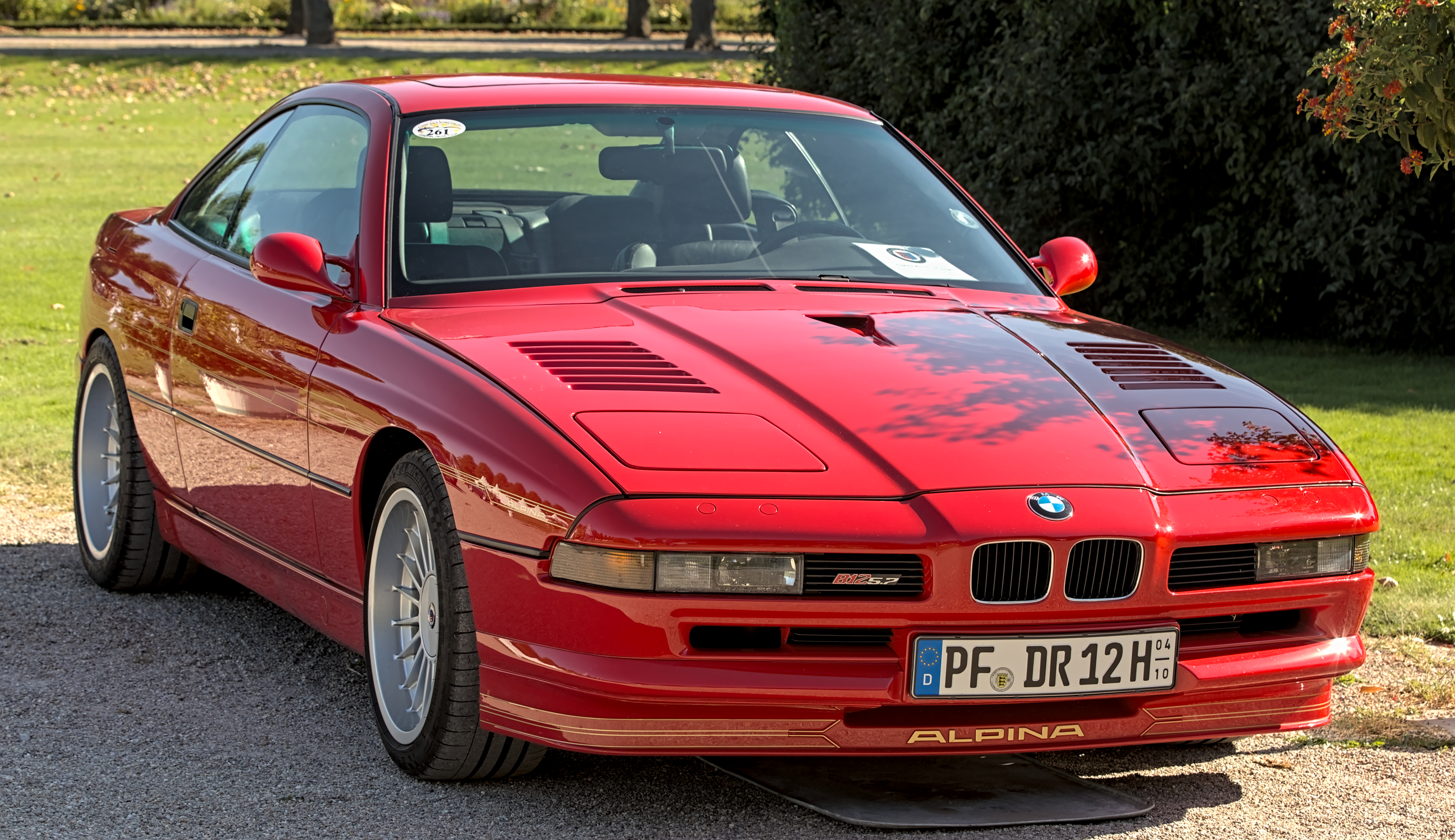
Alpina B12 5.7 Coupé

== Motorsport ==
The E31 was rarely seen in any form of motorsport, with one of the most successful examples built by Wagenstetter Motorsport. This car raced in the VLN Nürburgring endurance championship and was based on an 840i. Its powertrain was replaced with an E39 M5's 5.0-litre V8, producing 414 kW (555 hp) and 472 lb⋅ft (640 N⋅m) of torque, with a six-speed gearbox also from the M5..
