= BMW V12 =

BMW V12 may refer to V12 engines and V12-powered race cars built by BMW:

- Multiple V12 engines built by BMW from 1986 to 2022, the BMW M70, M73, N73 and N74, also used in Rolls-Royce
- The high-powered version BMW S70 for the McLaren F1, winner in Le Mans 1995
- Le Mans Prototype sports cars ran by BMW Motorsport using the S70 engine, the BMW V12 LM (1998) and BMW V12 LMR, winner in Le Mans 1999
