= Rolls-Royce Dawn =

Luxury convertible car

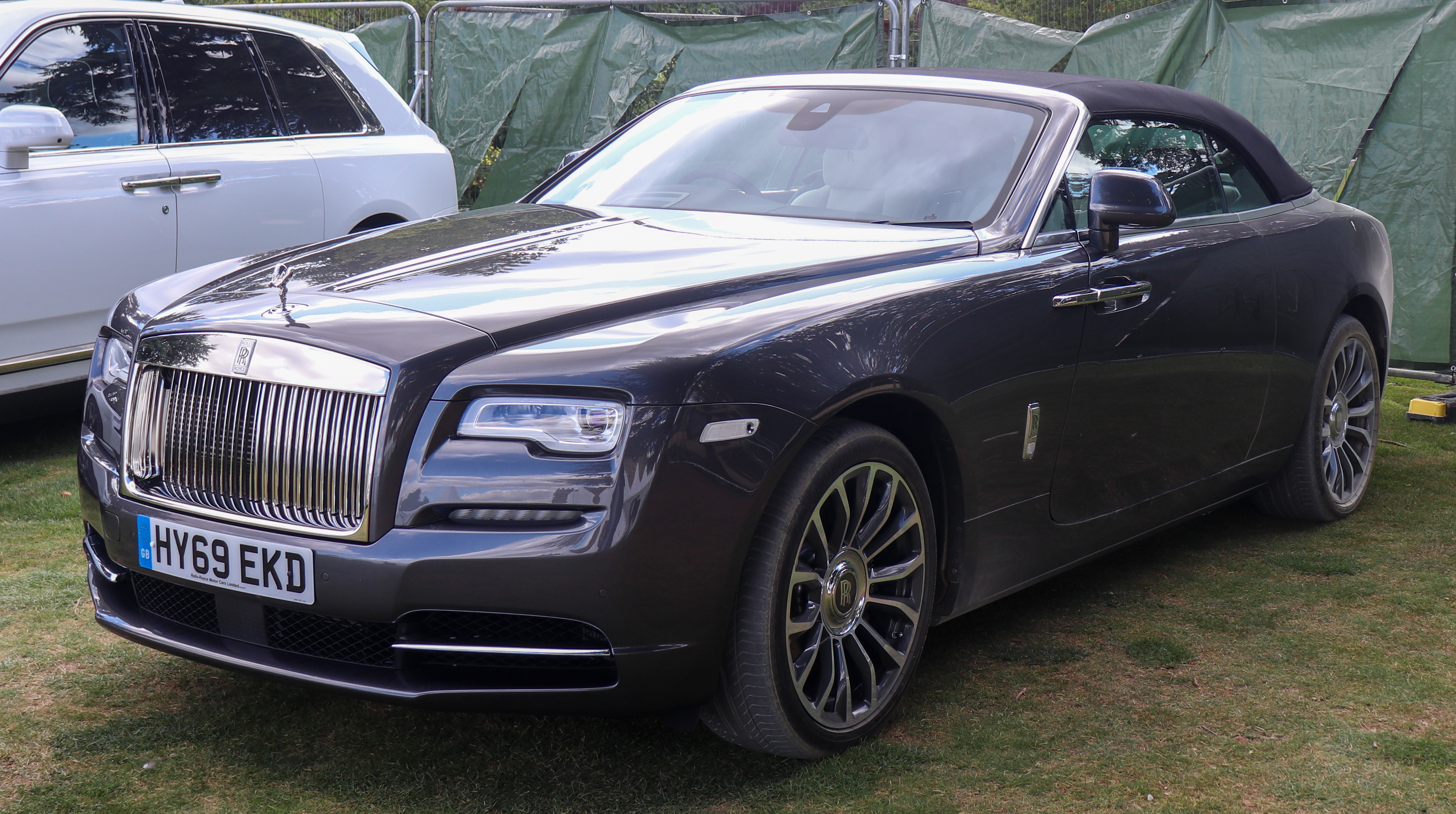

Overview
- Manufacturer: Rolls-Royce Motor Cars
- Production: 2015–2023
- Model years: 2016–2023
- Assembly: United Kingdom: West Sussex, England (Goodwood plant)
- Designer: Exterior: Andreas Thurner; Interior: Charles Coldham

Body and chassis
- Class: Full-size luxury car (F); Grand tourer (S)
- Body style: 2-door convertible
- Layout: FR layout
- Doors: Suicide doors
- Related: Rolls-Royce Wraith; Rolls-Royce Ghost; BMW 7 Series (F01)

Powertrain
- Engine: 6,592cc BMW N74 Twin-turbo V12
- Transmission: 8-speed ZF 8HP automatic

Dimensions
- Wheelbase: 3,112 mm (122.5 in)
- Length: 5,296 mm (208.5 in)
- Width: 1,947 mm (76.7 in)
- Height: 1,502 mm (59.1 in)
- Kerb weight: 2,560 kg (5,643.8 lb)

Chronology
- Predecessor: Rolls-Royce Phantom Drophead Coupé

The Rolls-Royce Dawn is a convertible luxury grand tourer manufactured by Rolls-Royce Motor Cars. It was announced at the 2015 Frankfurt Motor Show.

== Overview ==
The Rolls-Royce Dawn was built in order to replace the earlier 2-door open top car model, the Rolls-Royce Phantom Drophead Coupé.

The Dawn was built on the platform of the Rolls-Royce Ghost, unlike the earlier model which was based on the 7th Generation Rolls-Royce Phantom, the flagship car model of Rolls-Royce Motor Cars until the arrival of the 8th Generation and the Rolls-Royce Phantom Coupé.

The Rolls-Royce Dawn is the last open top combustion car made by Rolls-Royce Motor Cars. It's confirmed that the Spectre replaces the Rolls-Royce Wraith Coupé but the Dawn Cabriolet's replacement is yet to be announced.

== Specifications and performance ==
=== Engine ===
Petrol engines
Model	Years	Type/code	Power/rpm,	Torque/rpm	Fuel Consumption
Dawn	2013–2023	Direct-injection twin-turbo 6.6-litre (400 cu in) V12	563 bhp (420 kW; 571 PS) at 5,250 rpm	820 N⋅m (605 lb⋅ft) at 1,500 rpm	14.2 L/100 km (20 mpg_{‑imp}; 17 mpg_{‑US})
Dawn Black Badge	2016–2023		593 hp (442 kW; 601 PS) at 5250 rpm	841 N⋅m (620 lb⋅ft) of torque at 1500 rpm	

=== Performance ===
The car has an electronically limited top speed of 250 km/h (155 mph) and weighs 2,560 kg (5,644 lb). It can accelerate from 0–100 km/h (0–62 mph) in 4.9 seconds.

== Design ==
=== Interiors and exteriors ===
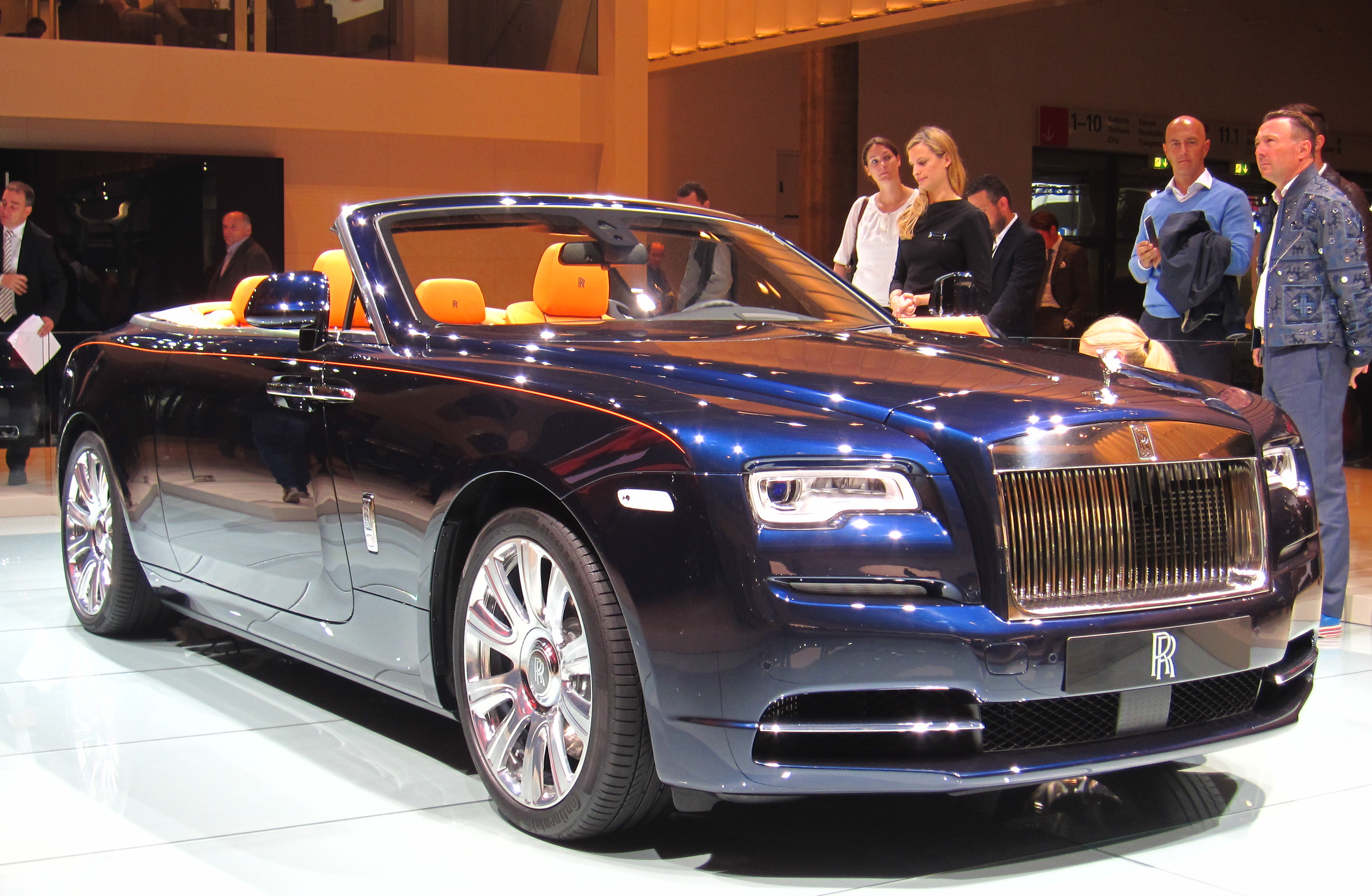
Rolls-Royce Dawn Standard Edition front view

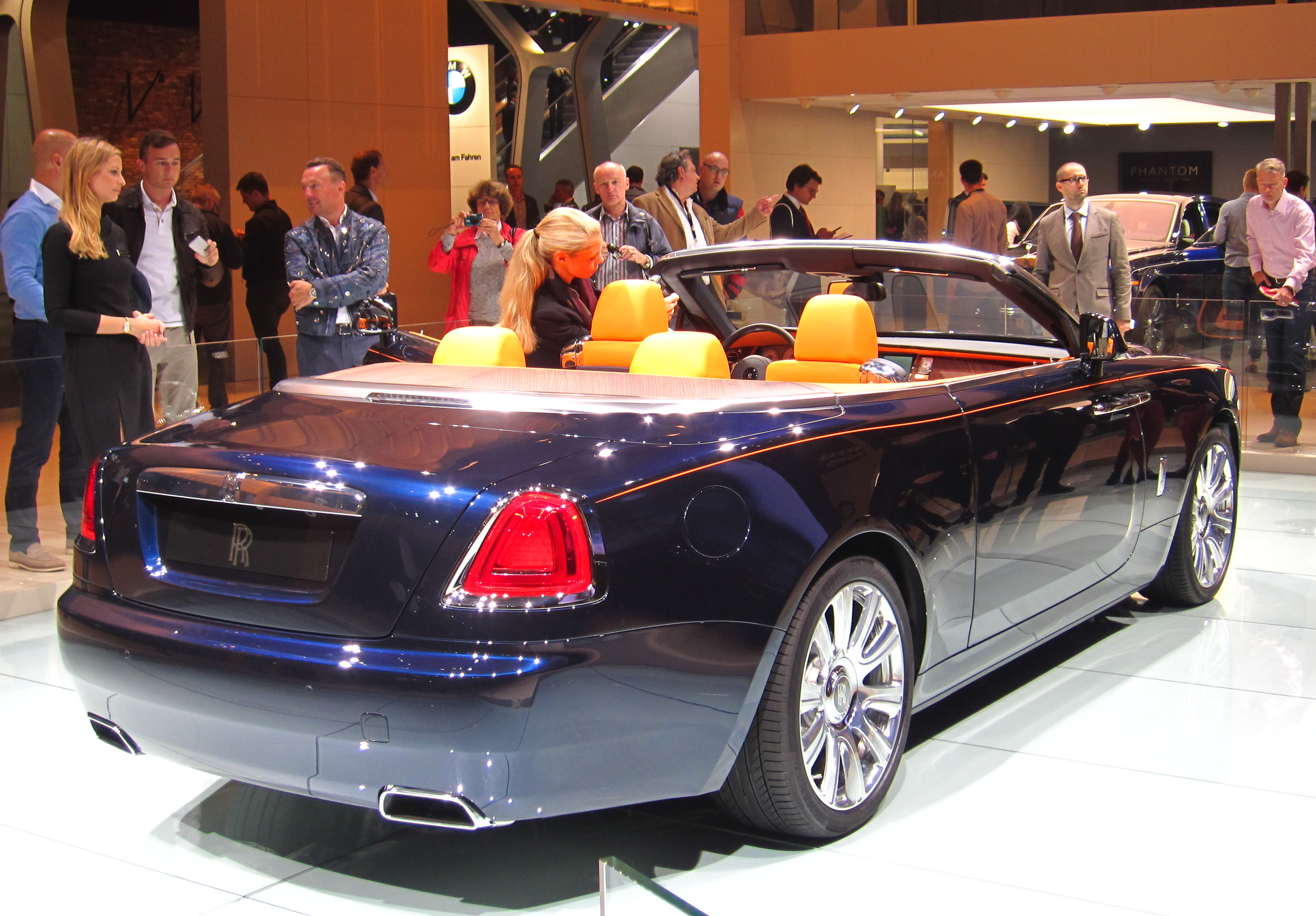
Rolls-Royce Dawn Standard Edition Rear view

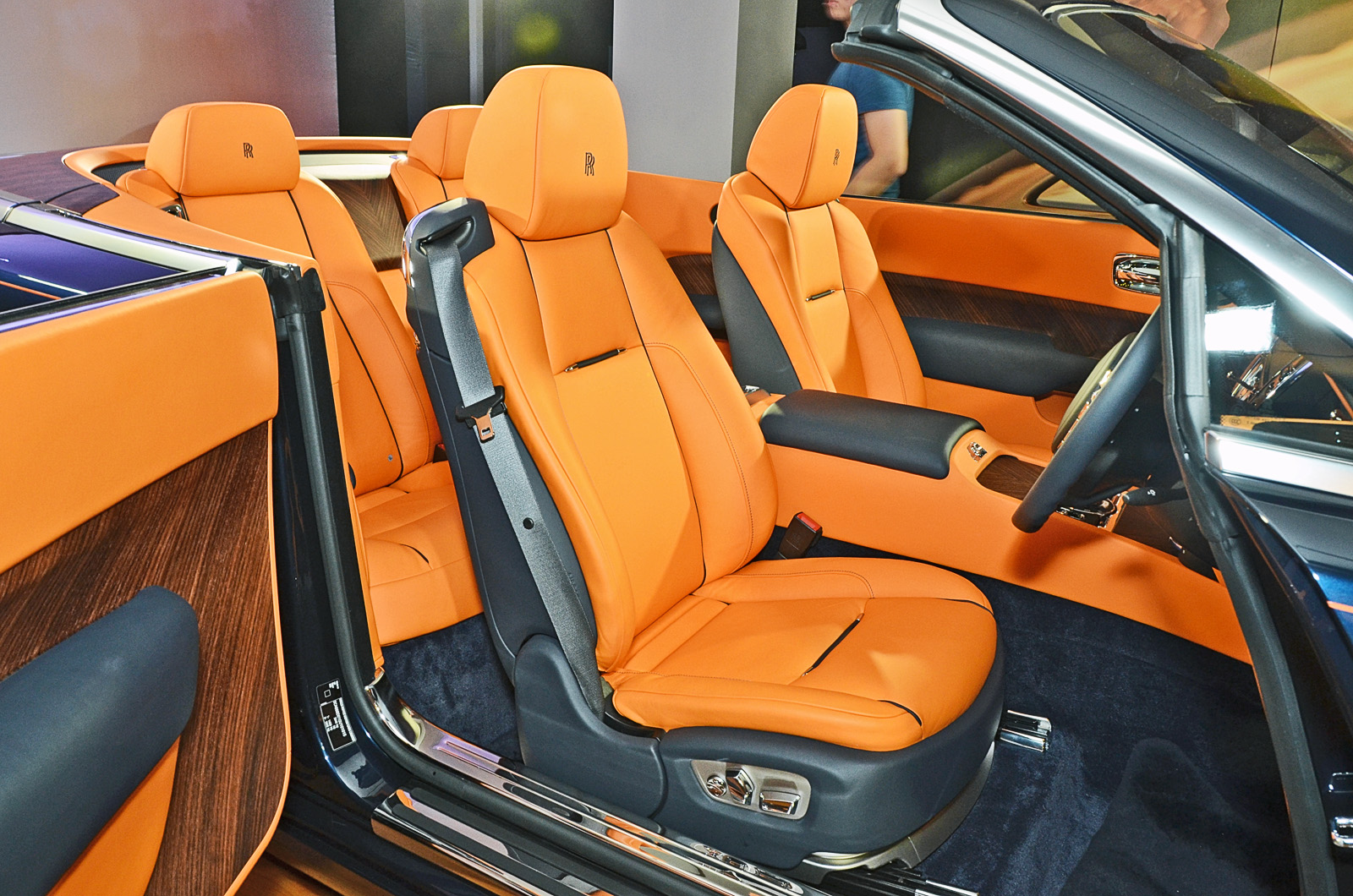
Rolls-Royce Dawn Standard Edition Bespoke orange interior, seating configuration

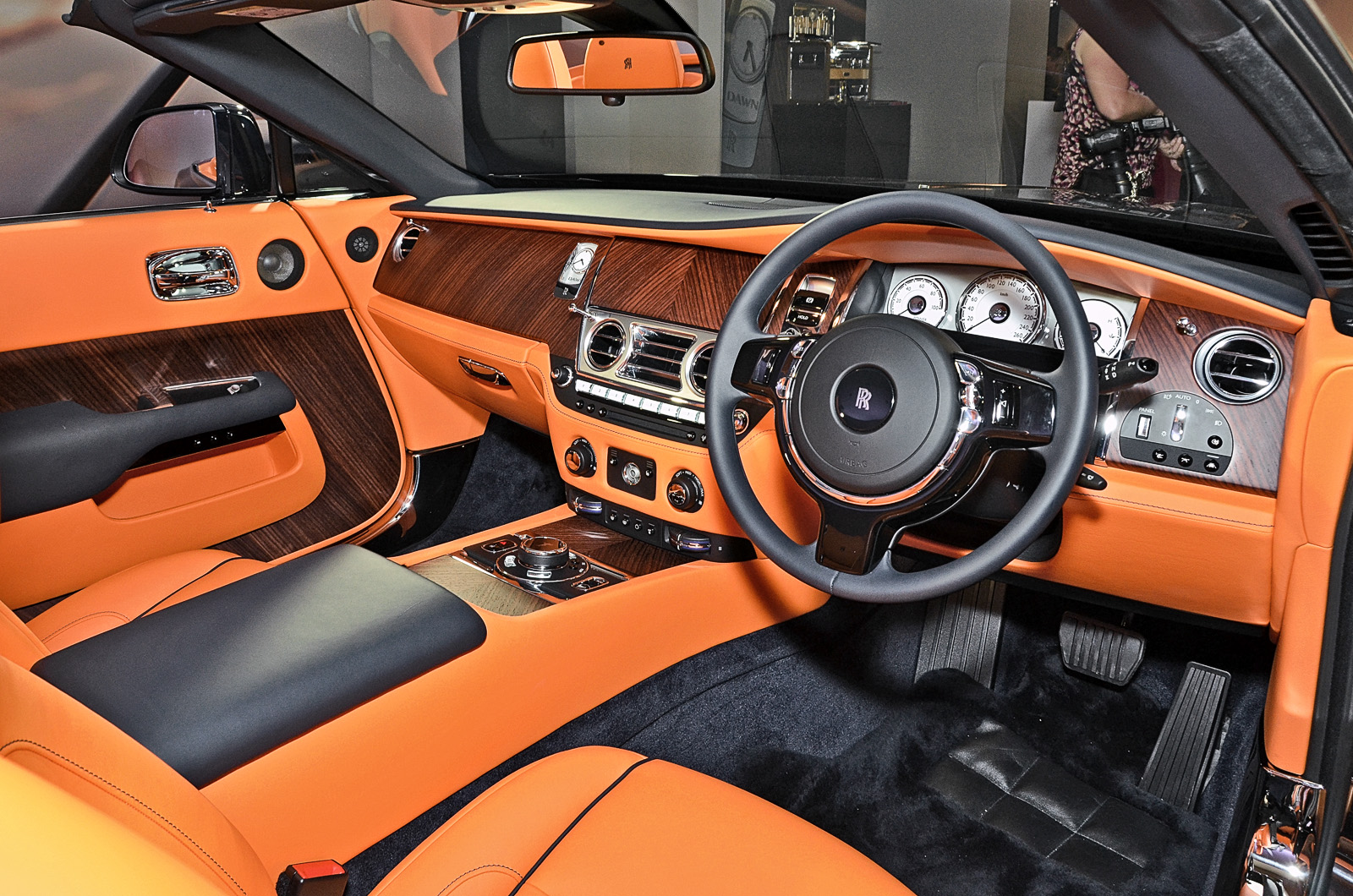
Rolls-Royce Dawn front Cockpit view

The front grille gets a design recess compared to the Wraith. The front bumper has been extended by 53 mm (2 in). The car has 20-inch polished wheels.

=== Body ===
Rolls-Royce has said that 80% of its body panels are new compared to the Wraith. To balance exclusivity and efficiency, Andreas Thurner designed the Rolls-Royce Dawn hand in hand with the Rolls-Royce Ghost Series II and the Rolls-Royce Wraith (Co-Designer Rolls-Royce Wraith)

== Variants ==
=== Rolls-Royce Dawn Black Badge ===
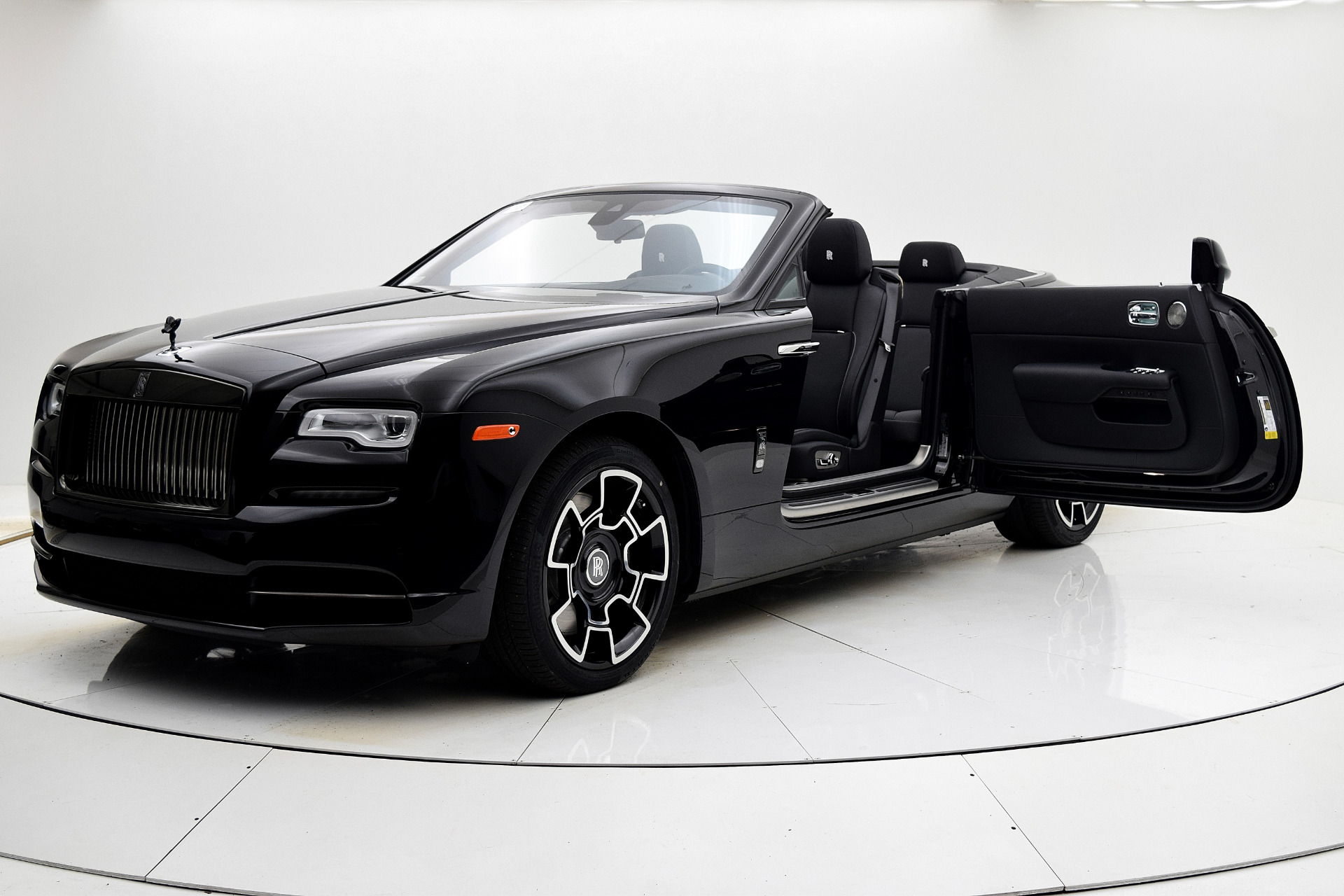
Rolls-Royce Dawn Black Badge

The Black Badge Dawn is a performance-oriented edition of the Dawn. Its exterior features are painted black (including the Spirit of Ecstasy) and has a new rim system. Its interior consists of carbon fibre applications and black coloured leather seats. The Black Badge marque has also been applied to the Rolls-Royce Cullinan and the Rolls-Royce Wraith.

=== Rolls-Royce Dawn Landspeed Edition ===
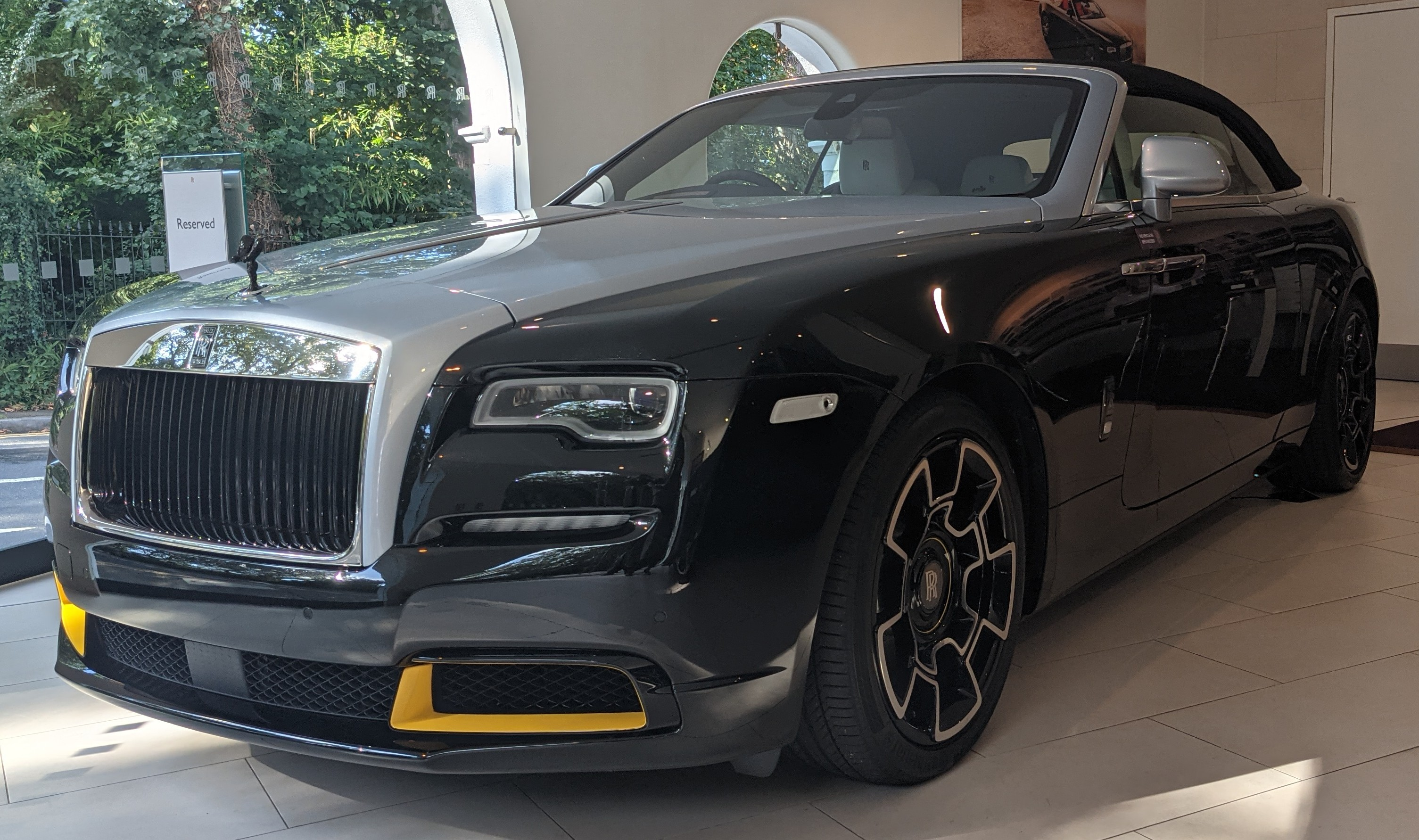
Rolls-Royce Dawn Landspeed Edition

Unveiled online alongside the Rolls-Royce Wraith Landspeed in June 2021, the Landspeed Edition is a limited version of the Dawn Black Badge made to pay homage to captain George E.T. Eyston.

The interior has new features such as the Eyston's OBE, Military Cross and Chevalier de la Légion, while some parts of the exterior are coloured yellow.

=== Rolls-Royce Dawn Silver Bullet ===
The Rolls-Royce Dawn Silver Bullet is a special edition of the Rolls-Royce Dawn inspired by the roadsters of the 1920s.

The exterior and interior designs are inspired by classic open top cars, and it has a newly redesigned convertible roof that drops down in 22 seconds. The interior features new retro-styled applications.

Production is limited to only 50 cars worldwide.

== Special editions by car tuners ==
=== Mansory Dawn ===
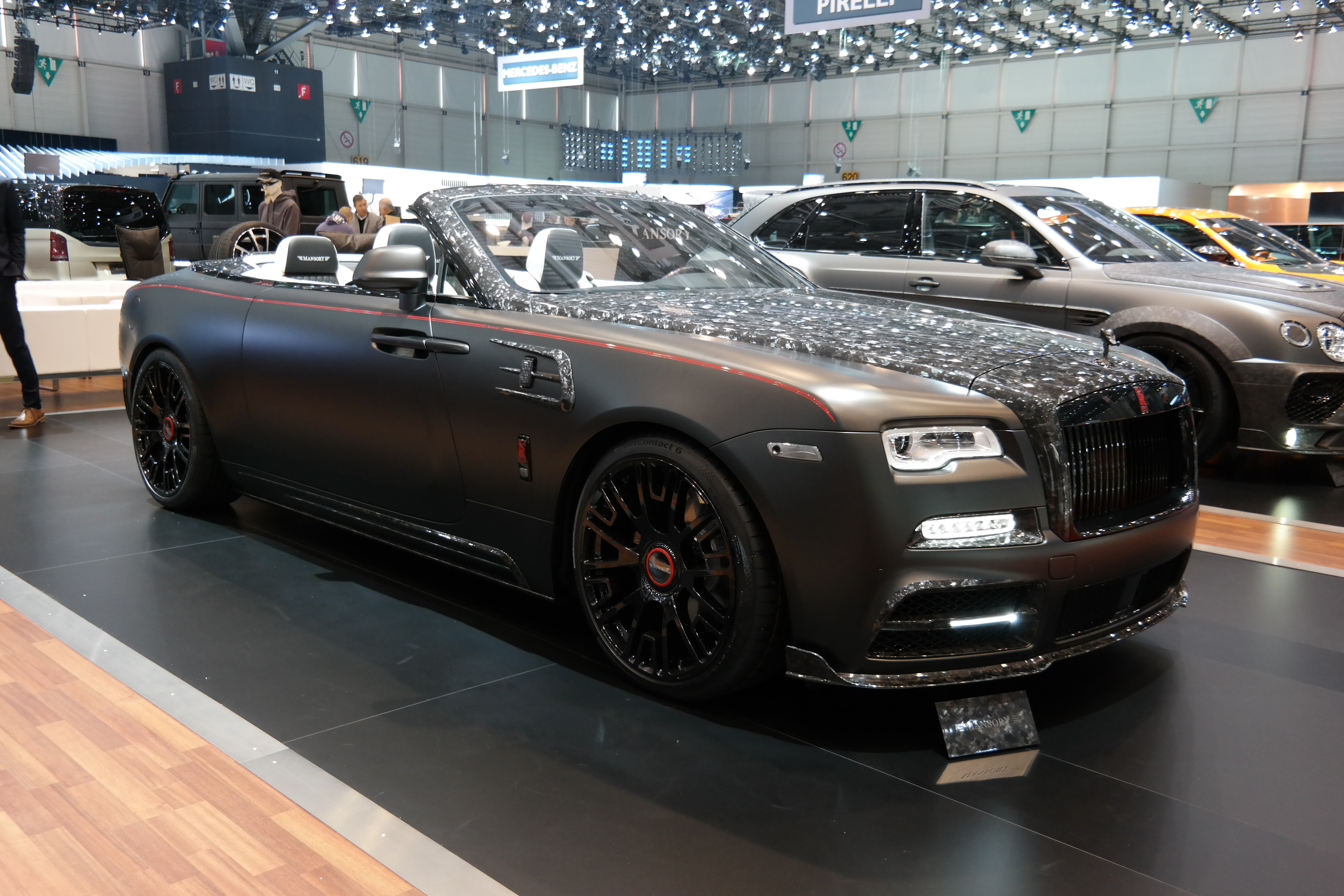
Mansory Dawn front view

The Mansory Dawn is a modified version of the Dawn by the German tuner Mansory.

The car features a new lower bodywork scheme and a new rim system. The car's interior has new leather applied seats and the interior has been customised using polished aluminium, carbon fibre, burl wood or highly polished piano lacquer surfaces.

The original engine has been tuned, allowing for a quicker 0 to 100 km/h (0 to 62 mph) time of 4.5 seconds. The top speed has been increased from 250 to 285 km/h (155 to 177 mph).

== See also ==
- Bentley Continental GT
