= Rolls-Royce Ghost =

Motor vehicle

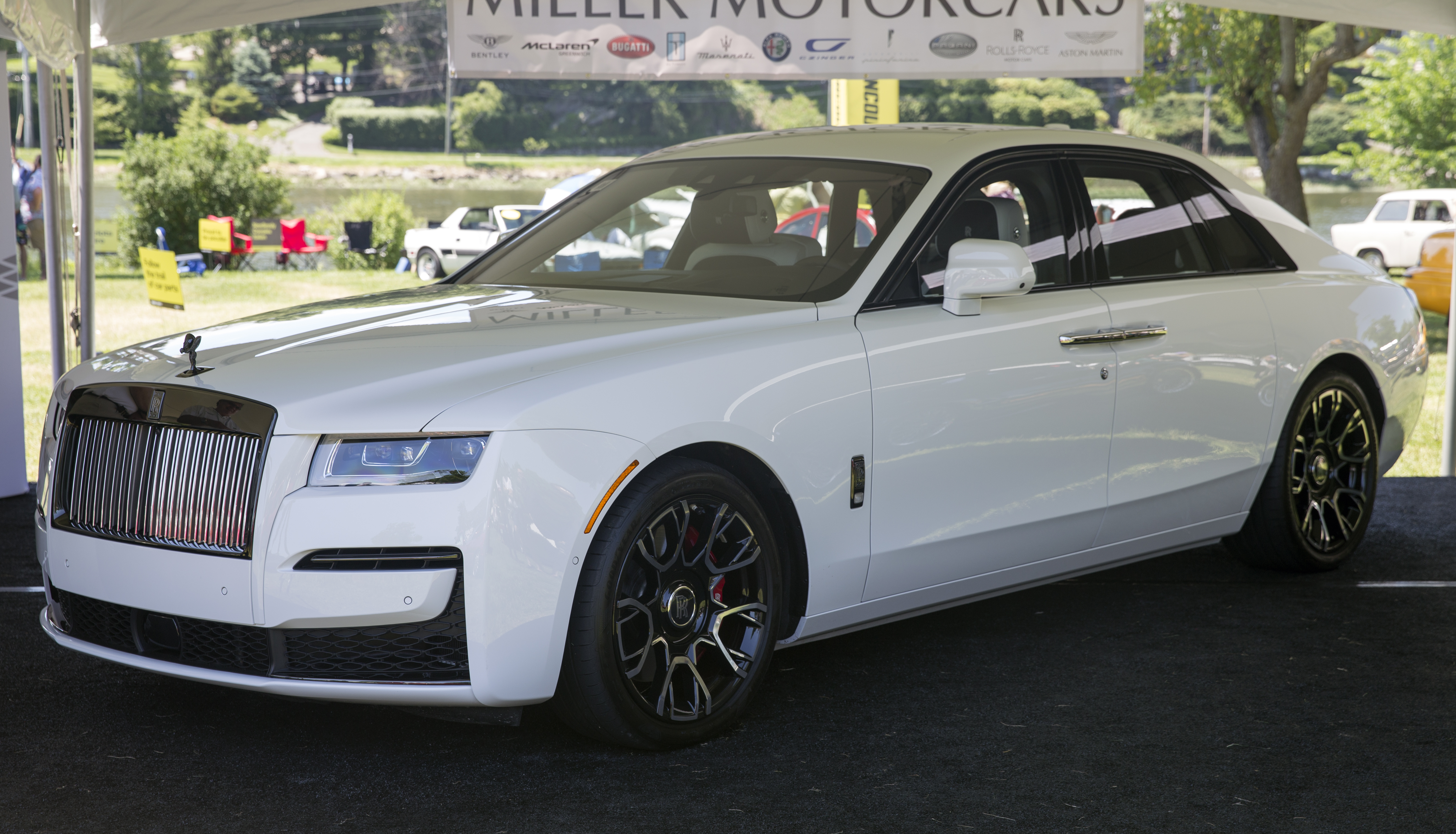
- 2022 Rolls-Royce Ghost Black Badge

Overview
- Manufacturer: Rolls-Royce Motor Cars
- Production: 2009–present
- Model years: 2010–present
- Assembly: United Kingdom: West Sussex, England (Goodwood plant)
- Designer: Henry Cloke

Body and chassis
- Class: Full-size luxury car (F); Ultra-luxury car
- Body style: 4-door saloon
- Layout: FR (first generation); F4 (second generation)
- Doors: Conventional doors (front); Coach Doors (rear)

Chronology
- Predecessor: Rolls-Royce Silver Seraph

The Rolls-Royce Ghost is a full-sized luxury car manufactured by Rolls-Royce Motor Cars. The "Ghost" nameplate, named in honour of the Silver Ghost, a car first produced in 1906, was announced in April 2009 at the Auto Shanghai show. The production model was officially unveiled at the 2009 Frankfurt Motor Show. The Ghost Extended Wheelbase was introduced in 2011. During development, the Ghost was known as the "RR04". It was designed as a smaller, "more measured, more realistic car" than the Phantom, aiming for a lower price category for Rolls-Royce models.

According to a statement by BMW AG, this generation of automobile, with an internal combustion engine, is to be produced until 2030, at which point the company intends to manufacture electric models only.

== 200EX concept (2009) ==
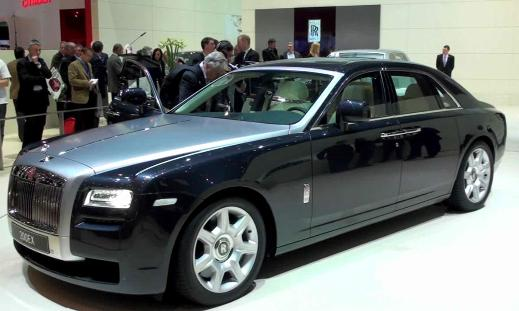
Rolls-Royce 200EX concept.

The Rolls-Royce 200EX, officially unveiled at the March 2009 Geneva Motor Show, indicated the styling direction of the production model Ghost. The Ghost's design is virtually unaltered.

== First generation ==
First generation
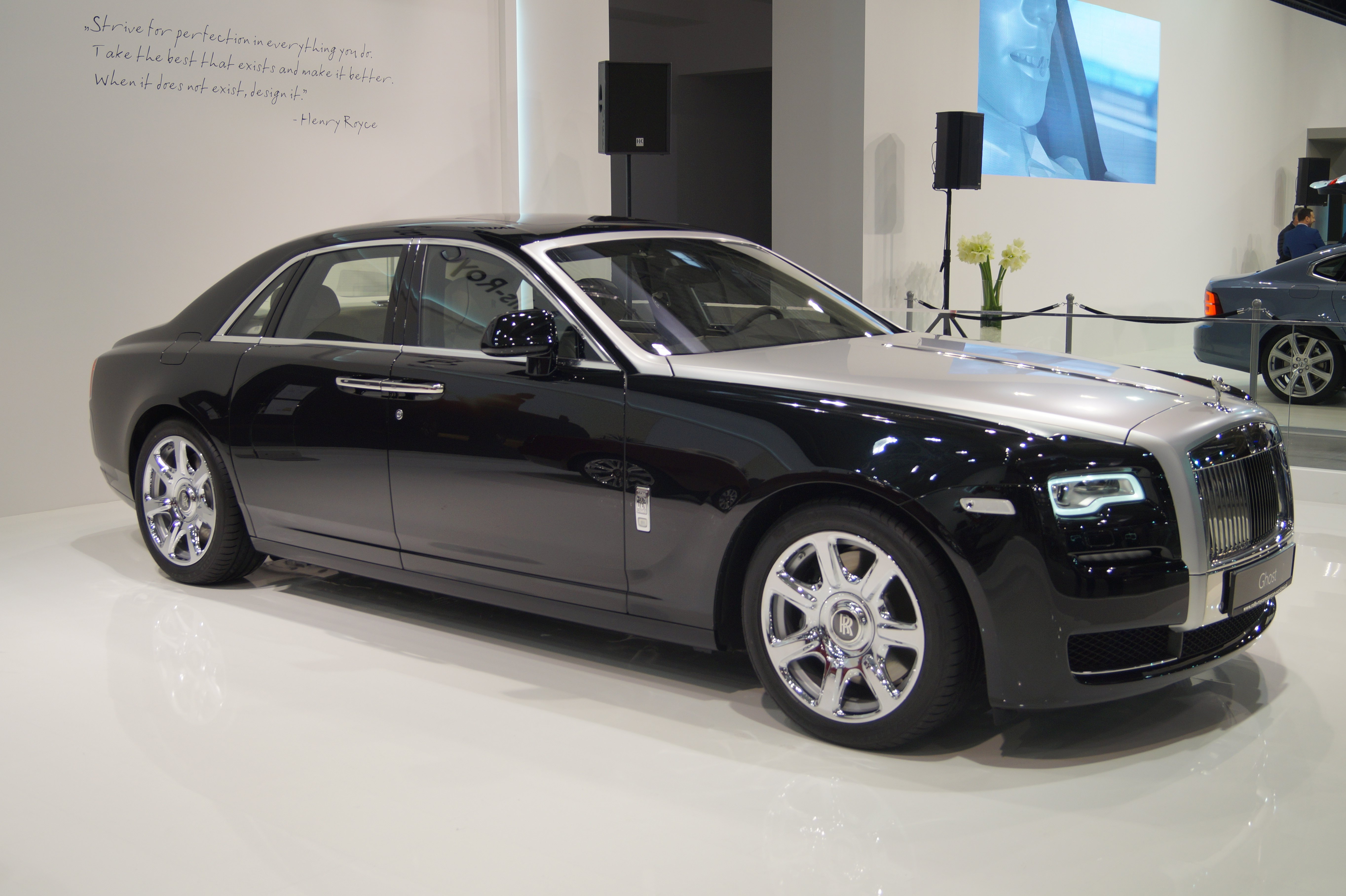

Overview
- Production: September 2009 – 2020
- Model years: 2010–2020
- Designer: Andreas Thurner (2006); Charles Coldham (interior)

Body and chassis
- Platform: BMW L6
- Related: BMW 7 Series (F01); Rolls-Royce Wraith; Rolls-Royce Dawn

Powertrain
- Engine: 6.6 L N74B66 V12-T
- Transmission: 8-speed 8HP90 automatic

Dimensions
- Wheelbase: 3,295 mm (129.7 in); 3,465 mm (136.4 in) (Extended Wheelbase)
- Length: 5,399 mm (212.6 in); 5,569 mm (219.3 in) (Extended Wheelbase)
- Width: 1,948 mm (76.7 in)
- Height: 1,550 mm (61 in)
- Kerb weight: 2,490 kg (5,490 lb); 2,520 kg (5,560 lb) (Extended Wheelbase)

The official name of the Rolls-Royce Ghost was originally announced in April 2009, the vehicle was officially unveiled at the 2009 Frankfurt Motor Show, and went on sale in September 2009. Delivery in the UK and Europe began late in 2009, while in other markets (including the US and Asia Pacific region) deliveries began from the second quarter 2010. The Ghost Extended Wheelbase was unveiled in 2011.

=== Ghost Series I (2009–2014) ===
The Ghost was designed by Andreas Thurner and Charles Coldham and engineered by Helmut Riedl, who led the development of the larger Rolls-Royce Phantom. The Ghost, codenamed RR04 during its design phase, was developed to compete with vehicles significantly less expensive than the Phantom, such as the Bentley Flying Spur and V12 engine versions of the Mercedes-Benz S-Class.

The Ghost is based on a platform shared with the F01 BMW 7 Series. The company concedes that 20% of parts are common to both cars. The Ghost has a 129.7-inch (3,290 mm) wheelbase, roof height, bonnet height and track widths all of its own, and the Ghost uses Phantom-style air springs. The car also shares the FlexRay electronic system with its larger stablemate. The car has a kerb weight of 5,445 lb (2,470 kg). The Ghost's platform in turn is used for the Wraith grand tourer and Dawn convertible.

Like other current Rolls-Royce models, the Ghost uses parent company BMW's iDrive user interface; the Spirit of Ecstasy bonnet mascot along with more functions, are controlled using the system. The Rolls-Royce Ghost is built on its own dedicated production line at the Goodwood plant, sharing paint, wood and leather workshops with the Phantom series.

=== Ghost Series II (2014–2020) ===
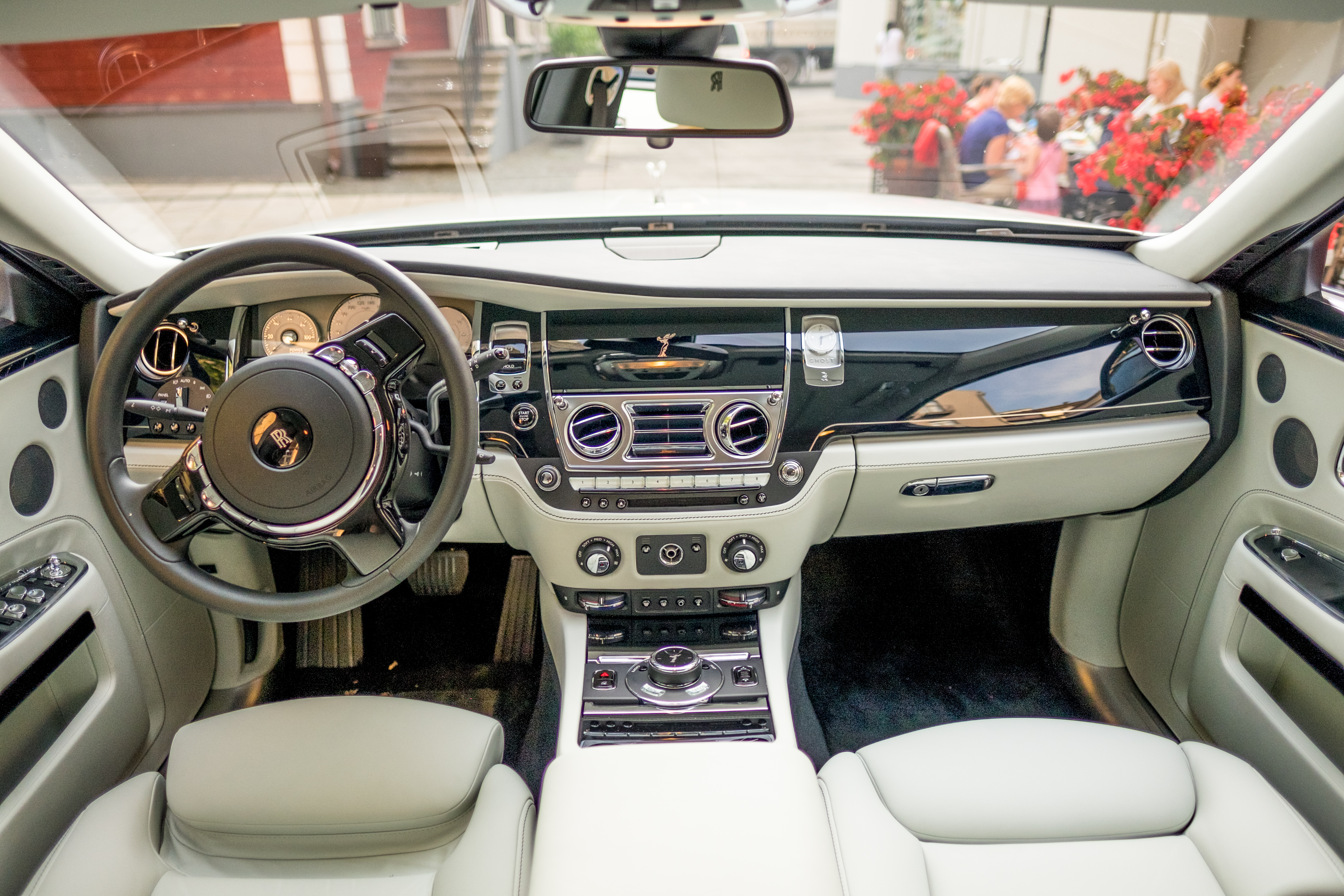
Interior

Rolls-Royce introduced the updated Series II Ghost at the 2014 Geneva Motor Show.

Visual changes over the Series I Ghost include re-sculpted headlights, and unbroken daytime running lights. The Series II also gained a tapered 'wake channel' on the bonnet, emanating from the Spirit of Ecstasy's wings. Chrome inserts were added to the front air intakes, which had been enlarged so as to feed more cooling air to the front brakes. The bumpers were also subtly revised, while the side character line Rolls-Royce calls a "waft line" was slanted further forward. New alloy wheel and colour options were also offered. Like the 2009 Ghost, the 2014 Ghost Series II was designed by Andreas Thurner.

On the inside, Rolls-Royce fitted redesigned front seats, and reangled the rear seats so as to allow for easier communication with other passengers. The clock fascia and instrument dials gained polished metal chaplets that evoke premium watch design. Natural grain leather could now be fitted to the A and C pillars, and two new veneers became available.

Technical modifications include redesigned front and rear struts coupled to new steering gear, as well as adjusted dampers and new rear hydraulic axle bearings. The Series II also gained advanced LED headlights. With the Series II Rolls-Royce also offers a "Dynamic Driving Package" that they claim offers a more involving driving experience. "Satellite Aided Transmission" technology was added to all Ghosts, which utilises GPS data, as well as analysing the driving style of the driver, to select the most appropriate gear.

==== Series II Black Badge ====
The Rolls-Royce Ghost Black Badge is a high performance variant of the Series II Ghost.

The Rolls-Royce Ghost black badge differs from the regular model as it has its exterior features coloured black such as the Spirit of Ecstasy and the exhaust system which are coloured silver in the Standard model. The car is also equipped with the unique Black Badge rim system.

The car has a 6.6-litre V12 engine which delivers a maximum power of 603 hp (450 kW) at 5,250 rpm and a maximum torque of 620 lb⋅ft (841 N⋅m) at 1,650 – 5,000 rpm. The car can accelerate from 0 to 100 km/h (62 mph) in 4.8 seconds and has a top speed of 250 km/h (155 mph). Its power-to-weight ratio is 176.3 W/kg.

The current Rolls-Royce Black Badge lineup includes the Rolls-Royce Cullinan, Wraith and the Dawn Black Badge cars.

=== Gallery ===
Series I

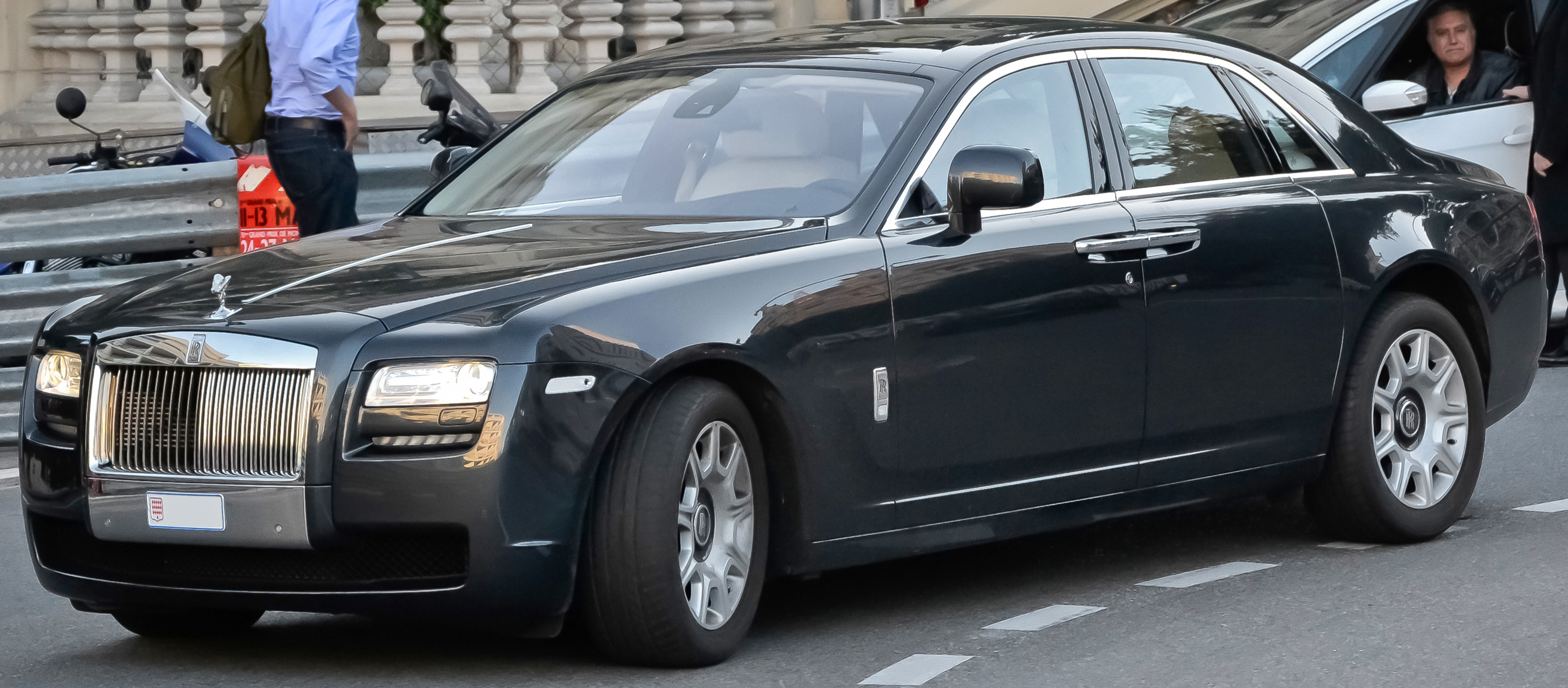
Front

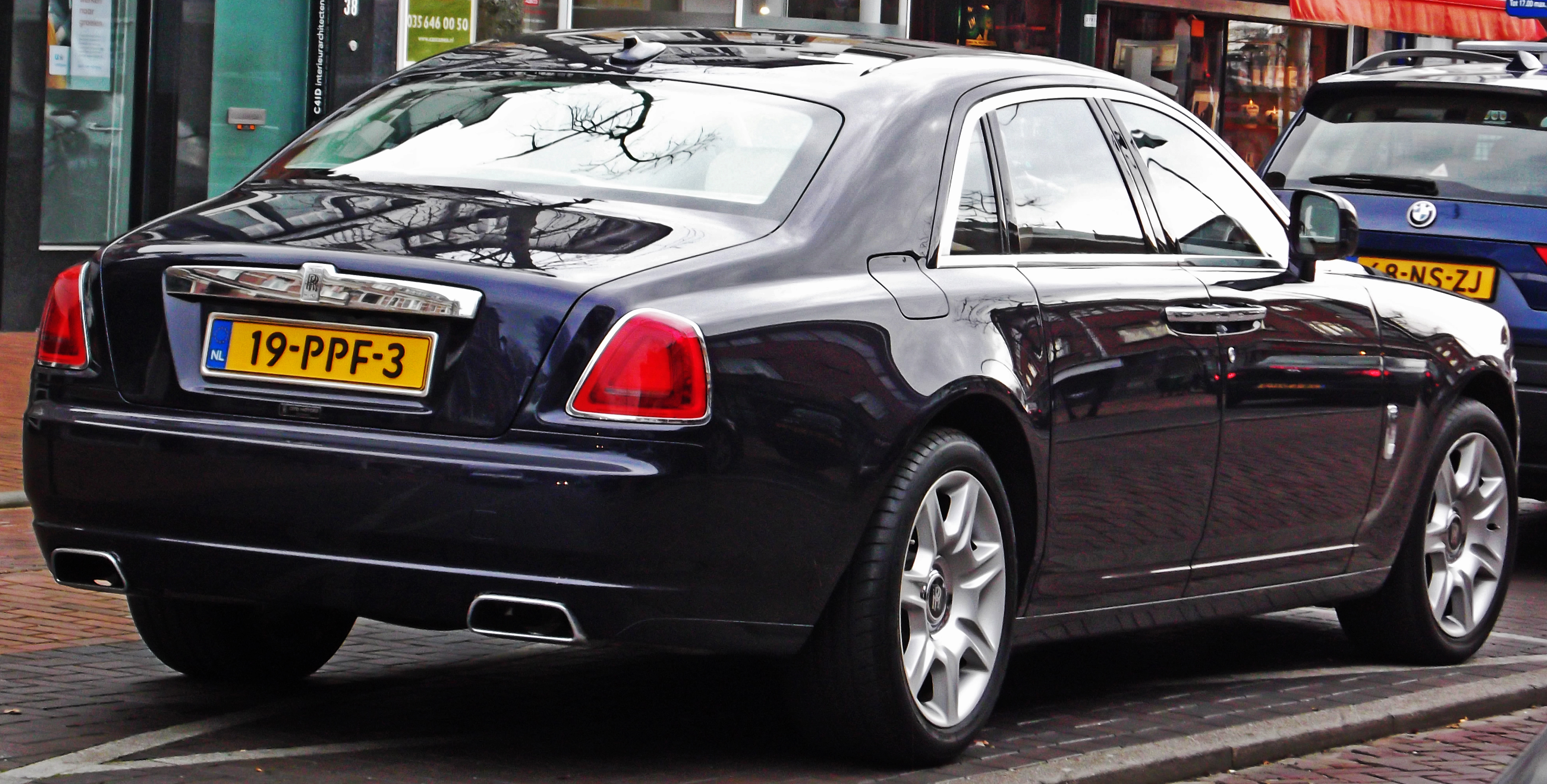
Rear

Series II

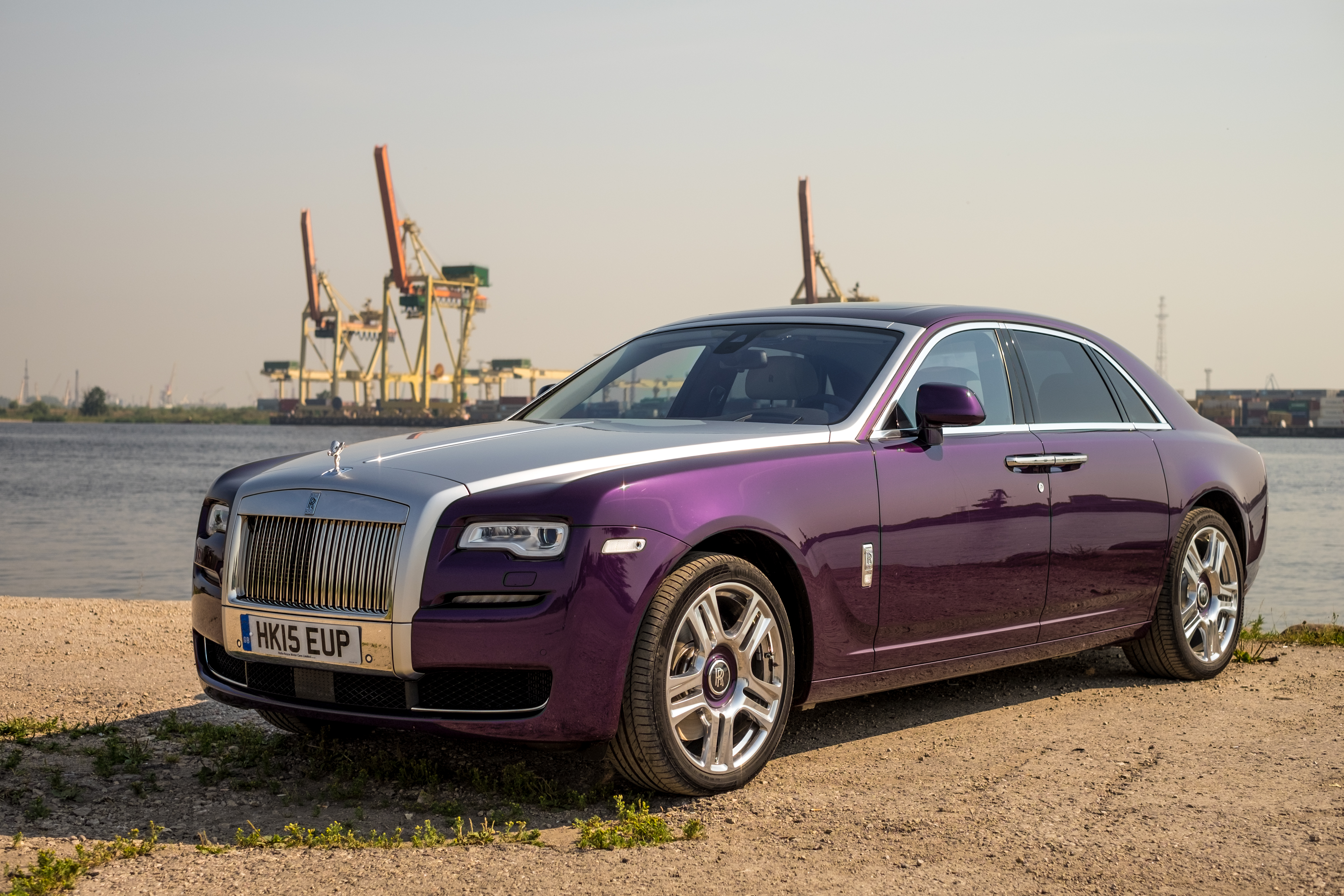
Front

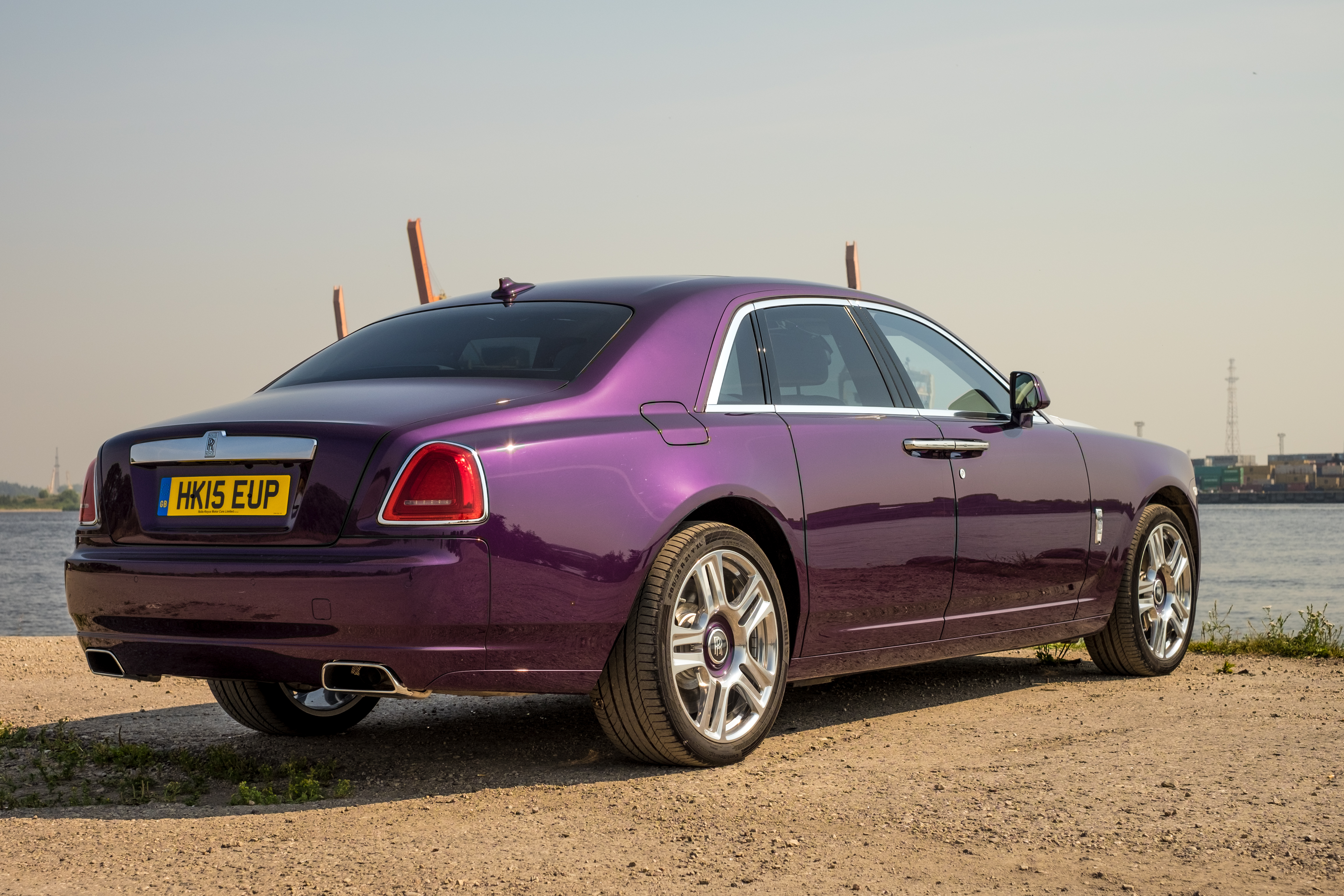
Rear

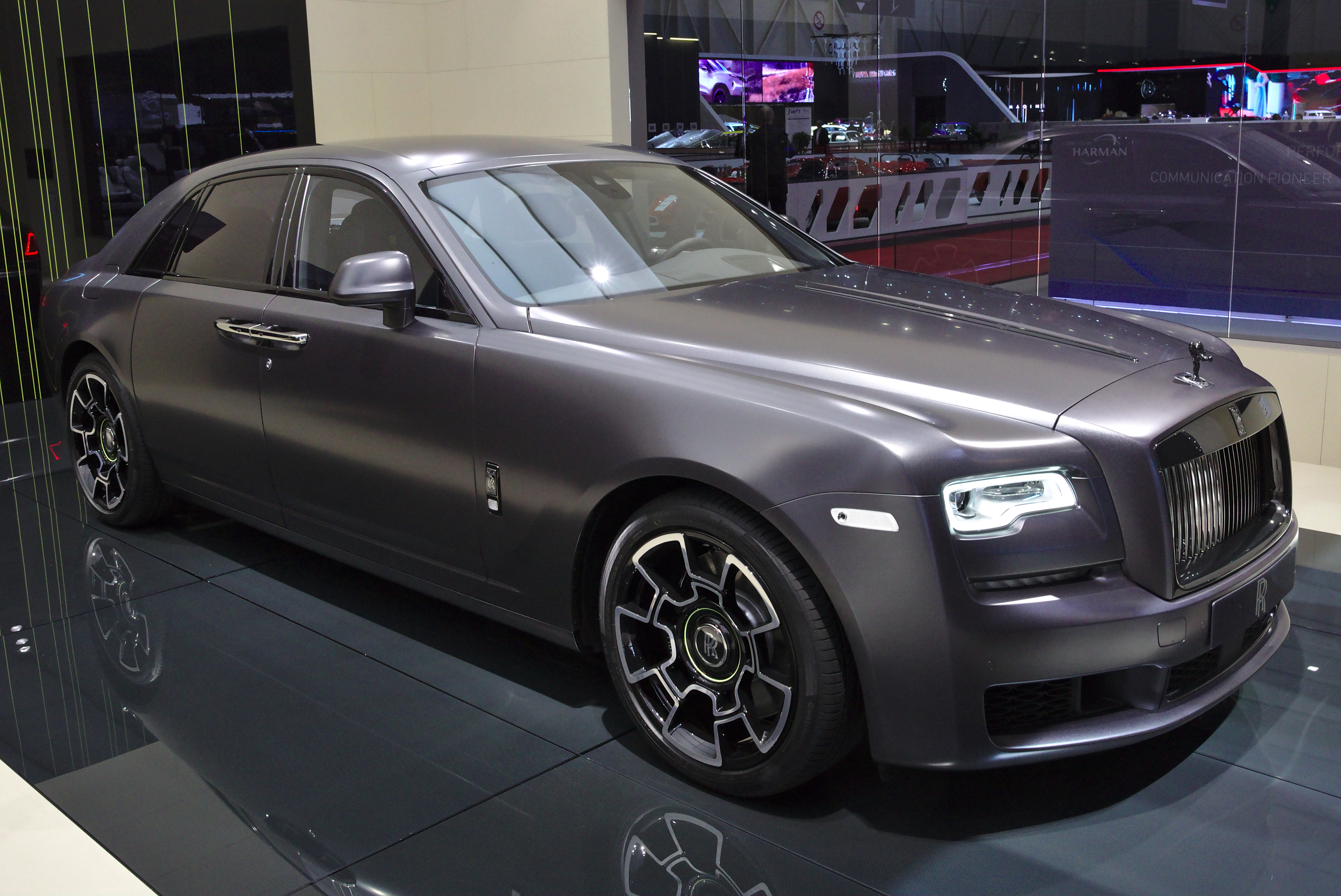
Black Badge, front

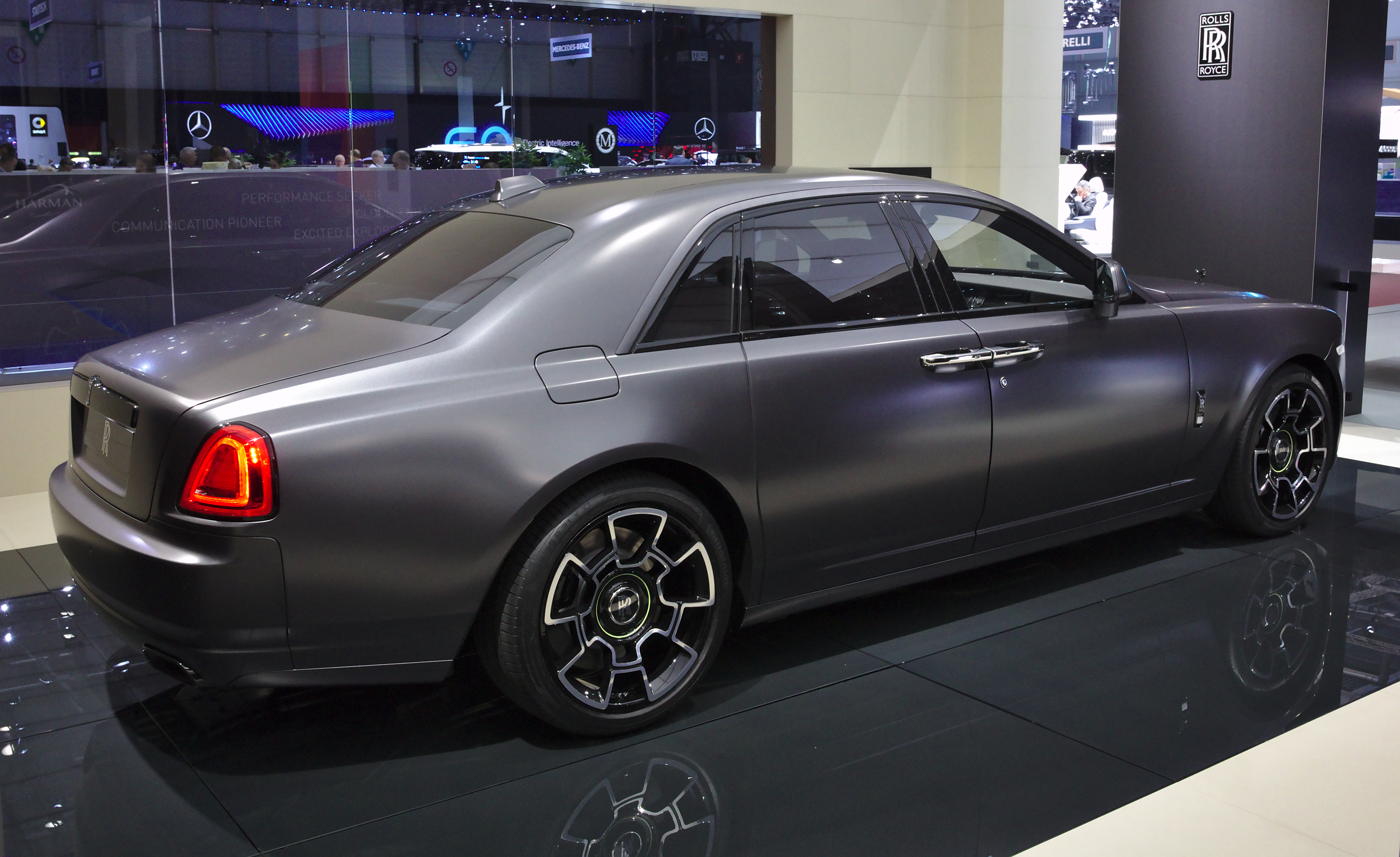
Black Badge, rear

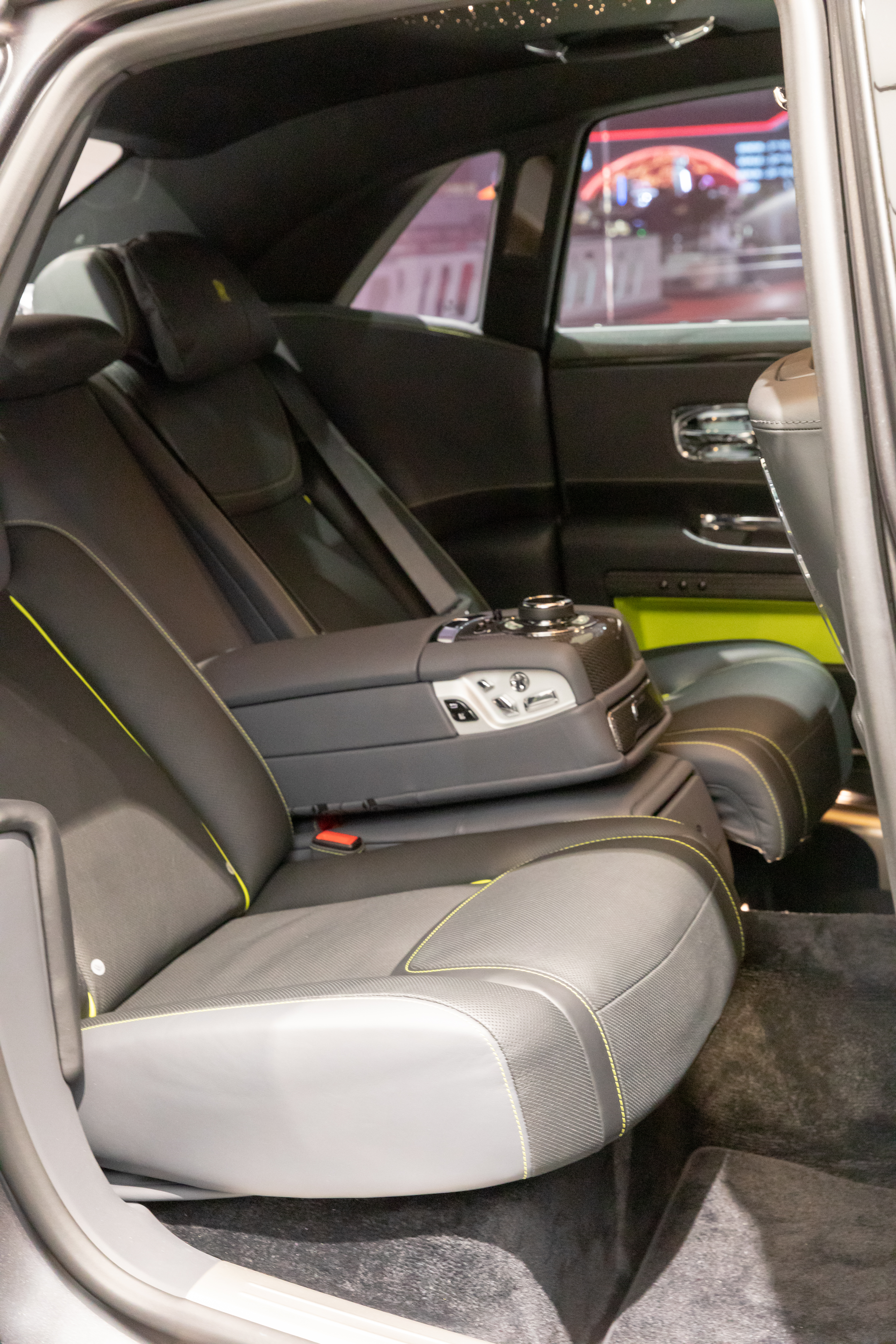
Black Badge, interior

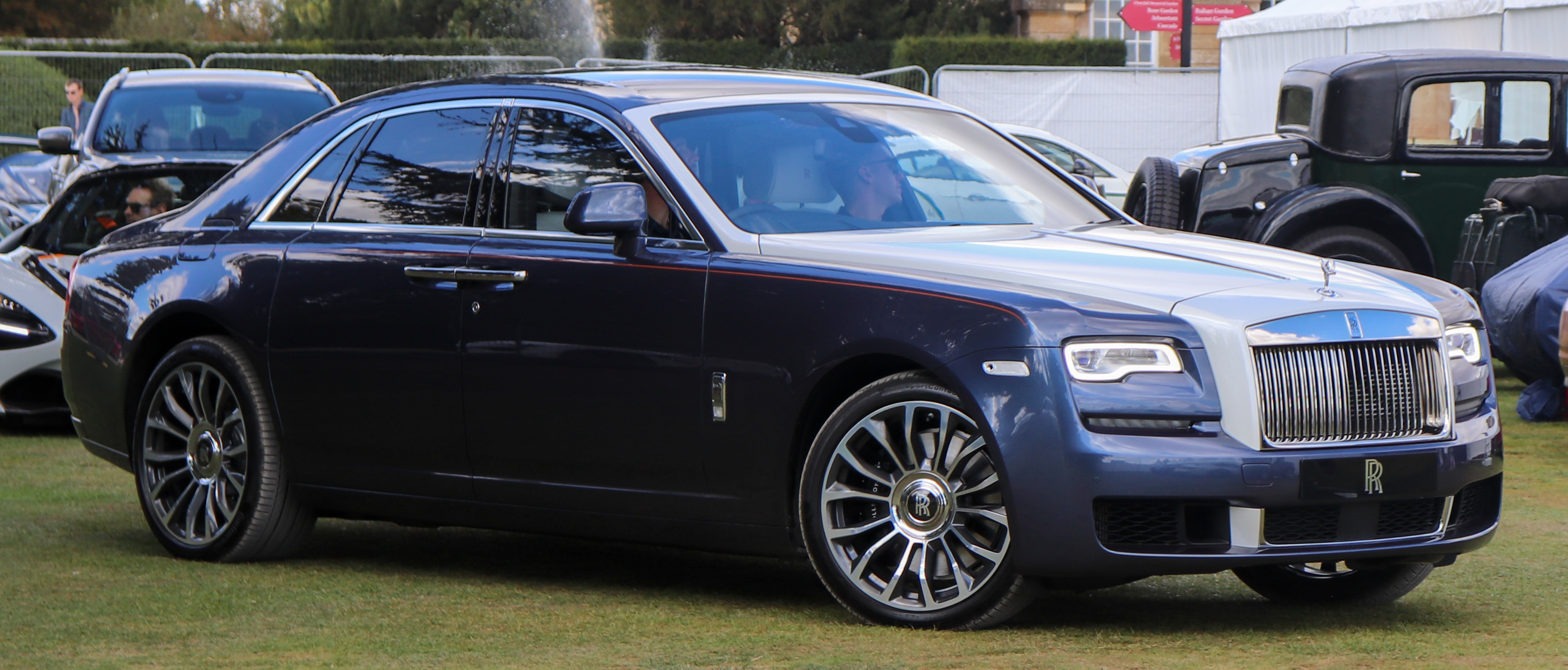
Rolls-Royce Ghost Zenith Edition (limited to 50 units)

== Second generation ==
Second generation
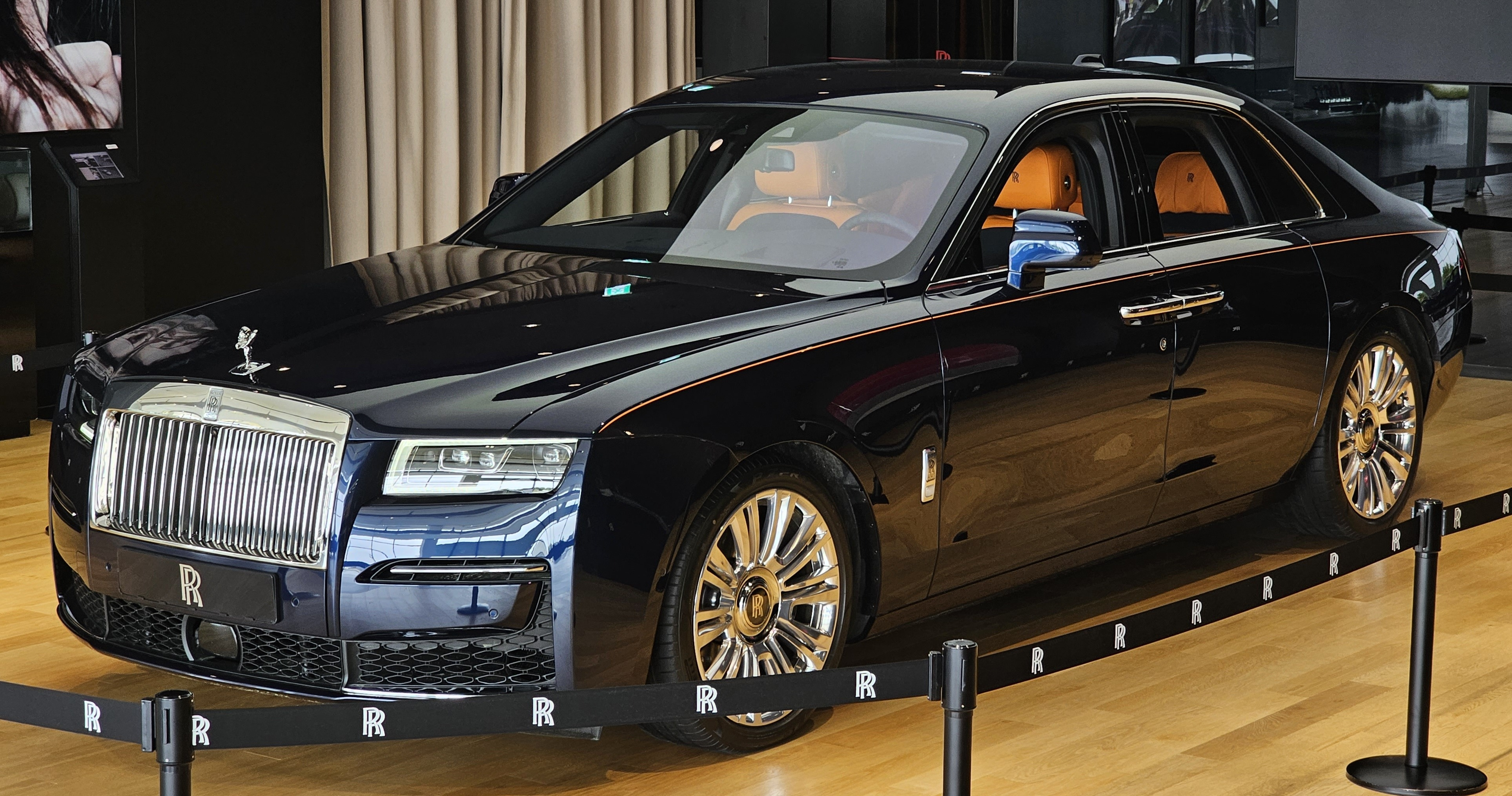

Overview
- Production: 2020–present
- Model years: 2021–present
- Designer: Henry Cloke

Body and chassis
- Platform: Architecture of Luxury
- Related: Rolls-Royce Phantom VIII; Rolls-Royce Cullinan; Rolls-Royce Spectre

Powertrain
- Engine: 6.75 L N74B68 twin-turbocharged V12 (petrol)
- Transmission: 8-speed 8HP90 automatic

Dimensions
- Wheelbase: 3,295 mm (129.7 in); 3,465 mm (136.4 in) (Extended Wheelbase)
- Length: 5,545 mm (218.3 in); 5,715 mm (225.0 in) (Extended Wheelbase)
- Width: 1,979 mm (77.9 in)
- Height: 1,550–1,552 mm (61.0–61.1 in)
- Kerb weight: 2,553 kg (5,628 lb) 2,599.1 kg (5,730 lb) (Extended Wheelbase)

The second generation Ghost was seen testing for the first time on 24 January 2019. The model was fully revealed on 1 September 2020. Unlike the first generation, this car shares the same platform as the eighth-generation Phantom and the Cullinan SUV.

=== Ghost Series I (2021–2025) ===
The latest Ghost iteration features all-wheel drive, all-wheel steering, a so-called "Planar" suspension and a new illuminated grille. The "Planar" suspension incorporates additional dampers and mass designed to address high-frequency vibrations. The illuminated grille, the first of its type to appear on a Rolls-Royce, features spokes illuminated by lights housed within the top triangular portion of the traditionally shaped grille.

Unlike its predecessor, the new Ghost features the Rolls-Royce "Starlight headliner" in the interior which was previously limited to only the Phantom cars starting from the special edition of the Rolls-Royce Phantom (seventh generation), the Phantom Celestial. The interior is also claimed to be more detailed than its predecessor's.

Similar to its predecessor, the new Ghost also features an extended wheelbase (EWB) variant, which is a longer version of the Ghost. It is less than 1% shorter than the standard-length Phantom, with most of the changes being to the enlarged rear seating area. The exterior design is identical to the standard version.

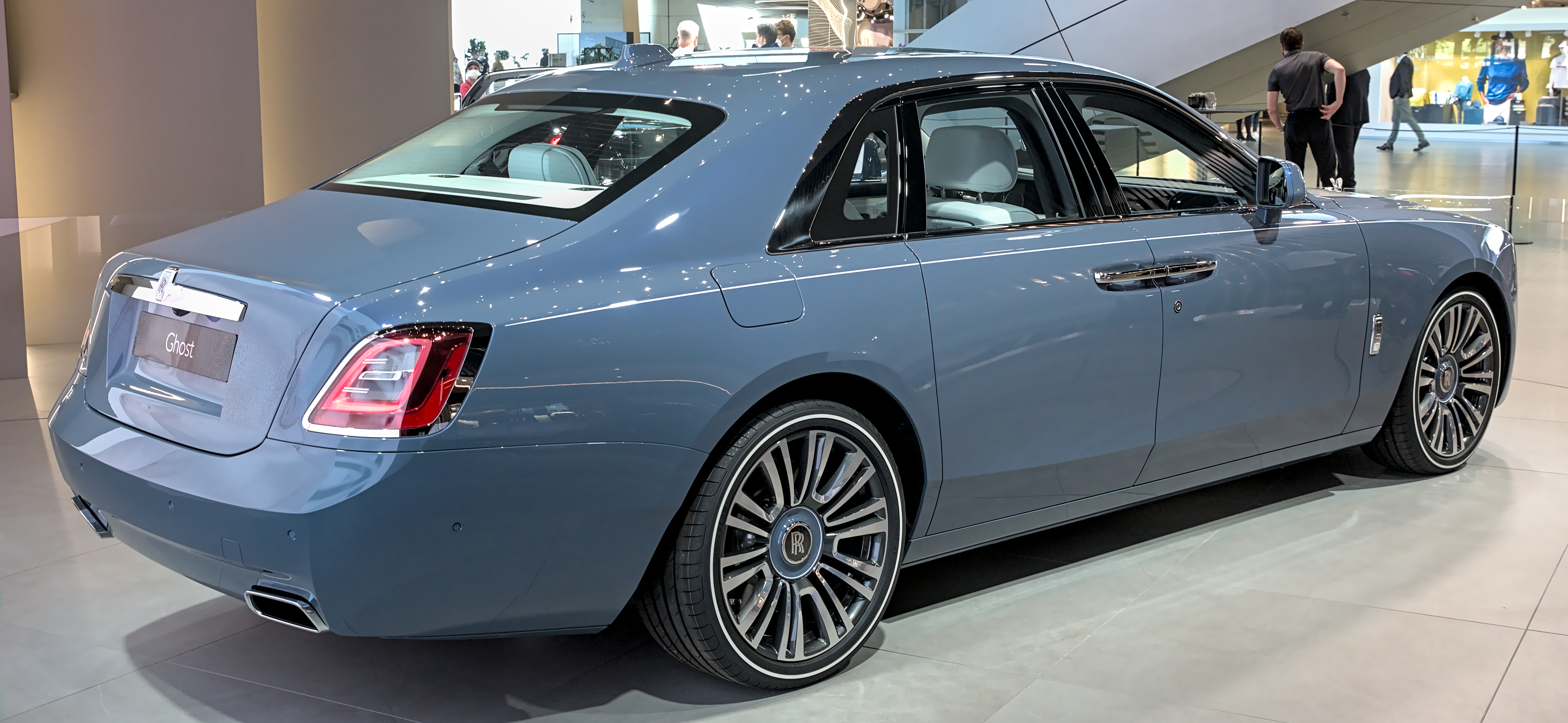
Rear view

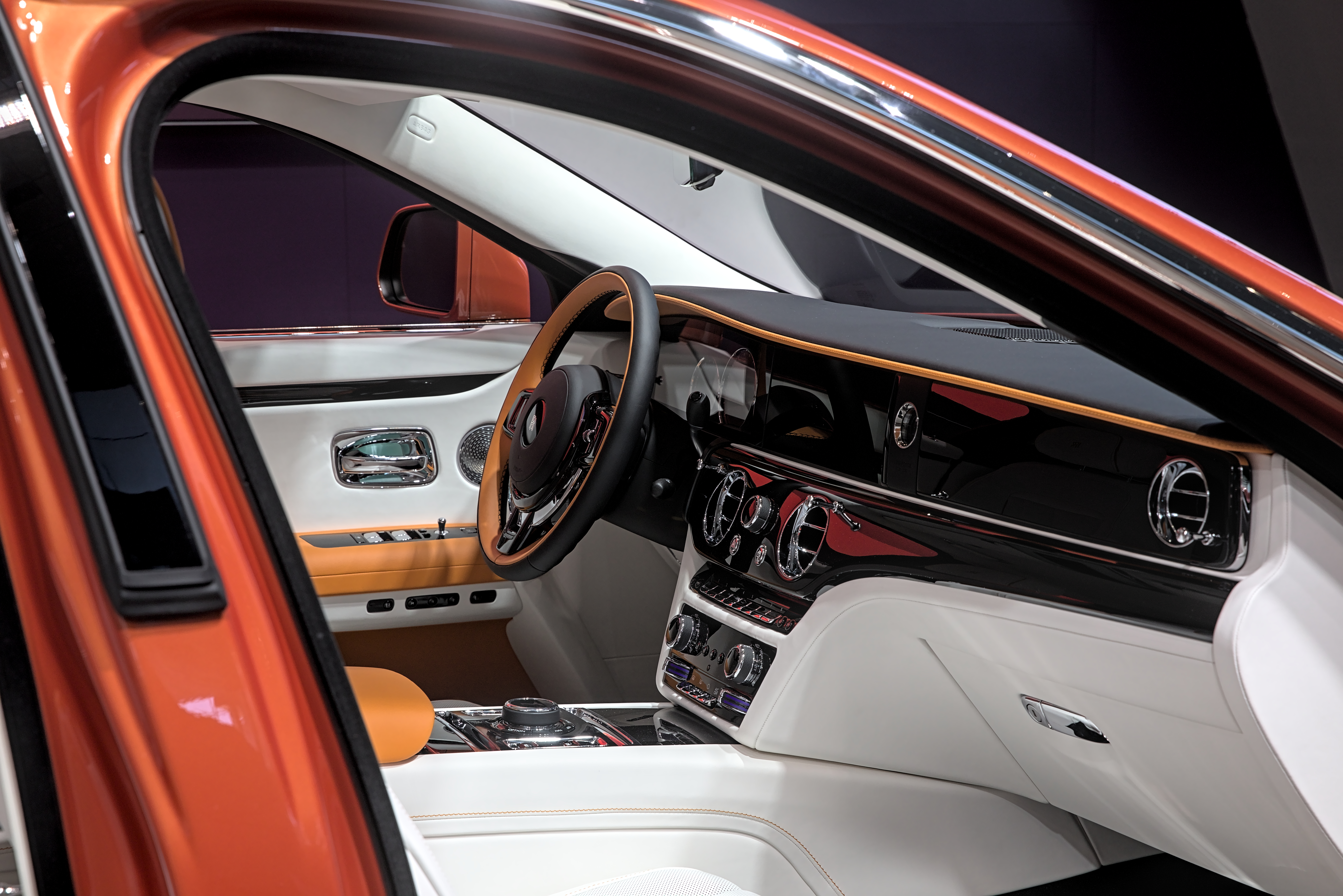
Interior
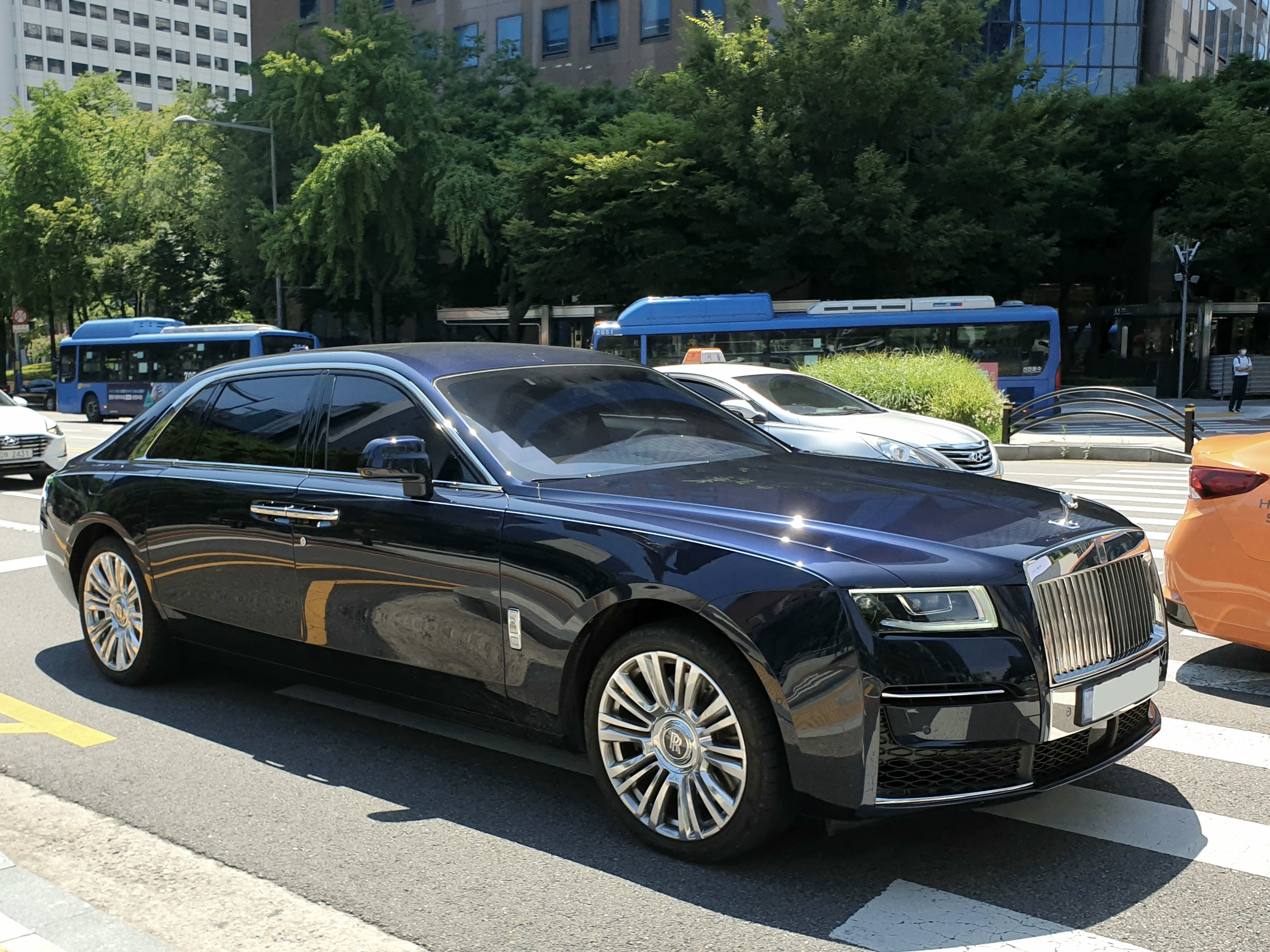
EWB, front view

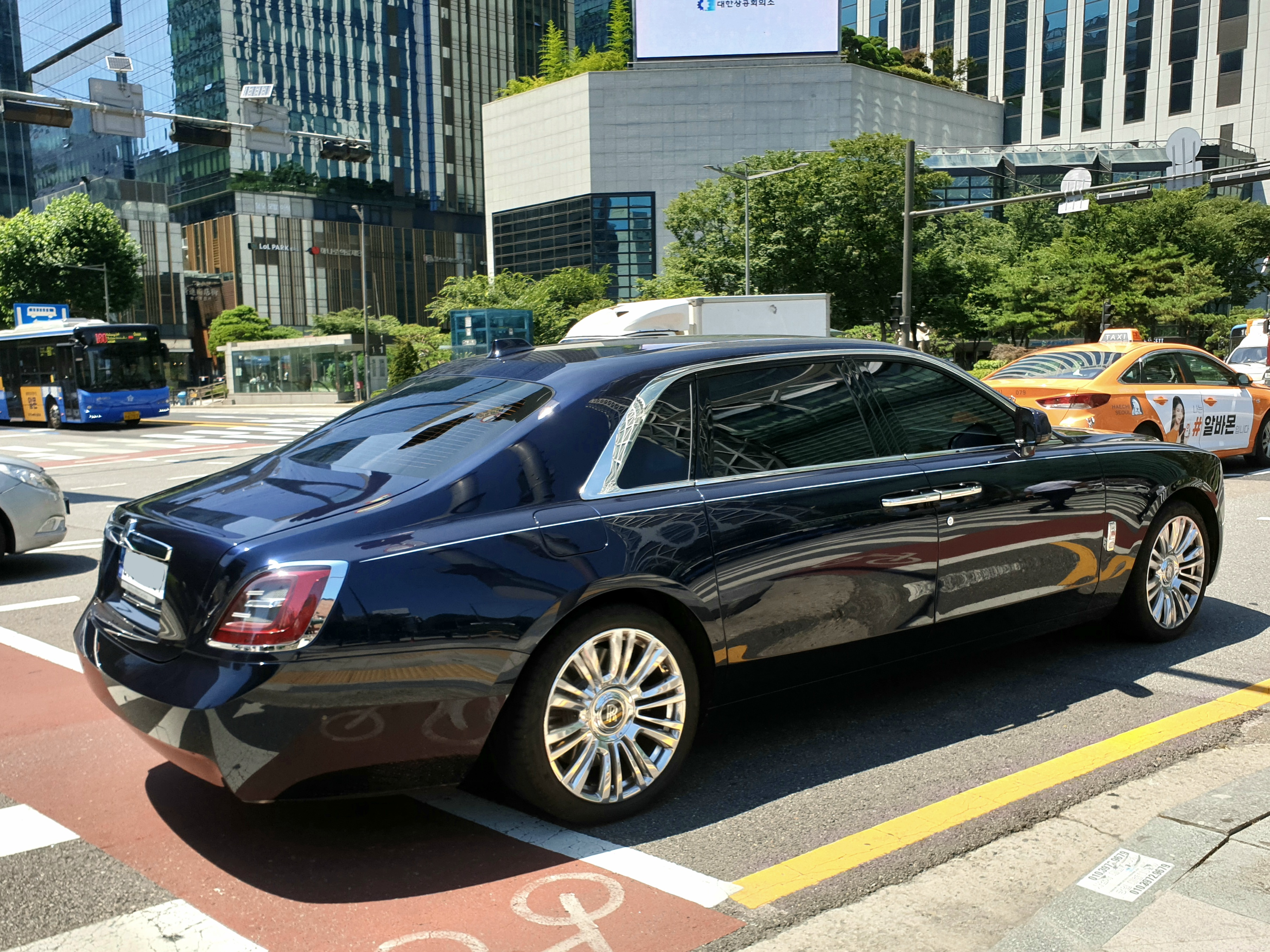
EWB, rear view

=== Ghost Series II (2025–) ===
The updated second-generation Ghost was officially revealed by Rolls-Royce on 9 October, 2024.

Changes in the exterior include restyled front and rear fascias, including slimmer headlights, a slightly larger Pantheon grille, redesigned bumper and redesigned taillight graphics. Two 22-inch nine-spoke wheel designs, as well as the new color "Mustique Blue" are new options.

The interior features new upholstery options, including Placed Perforation and Duality Twill. The latter is a bamboo-made fabric incorporating over 11 miles of thread and 2.2 million stiches; it required 1 year of development and adds 20 hours to the building process of each model. A new Gray Stained Ash wood veneer is also available.

=== Ghost Black Badge ===
The Rolls-Royce Ghost Black Badge is a high performance variant of the second generation Ghost unveiled in October 2021. It differs from the standard model in appearance due to black exterior detailing.

It shares the same 6.75-litre V-12 with the standard model and its all-wheel-drive chassis, but the engine has been tuned to produce 592 hp (441 kW; 600 PS). It also returns an estimated 14 mpg_{‑US} (17 L/100 km; 17 mpg_{‑imp}). It can accelerate from 0 to 60 mph (0 to 97 km/h) in 4.2 seconds and to 100 mph (160 km/h) in 10.3 seconds. It has a top speed of 155 mph (249 km/h).

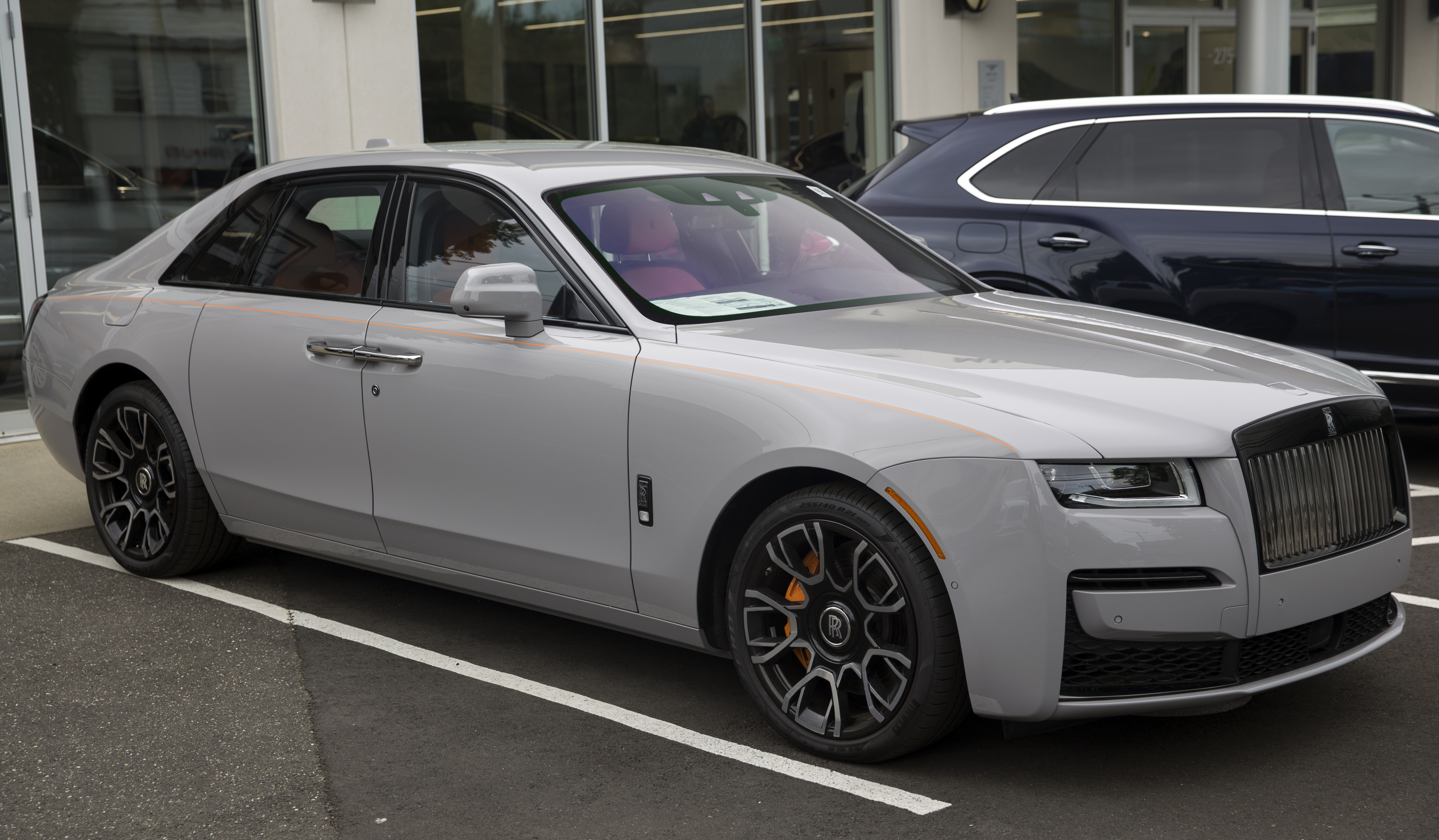
2022 Ghost Black Badge front view

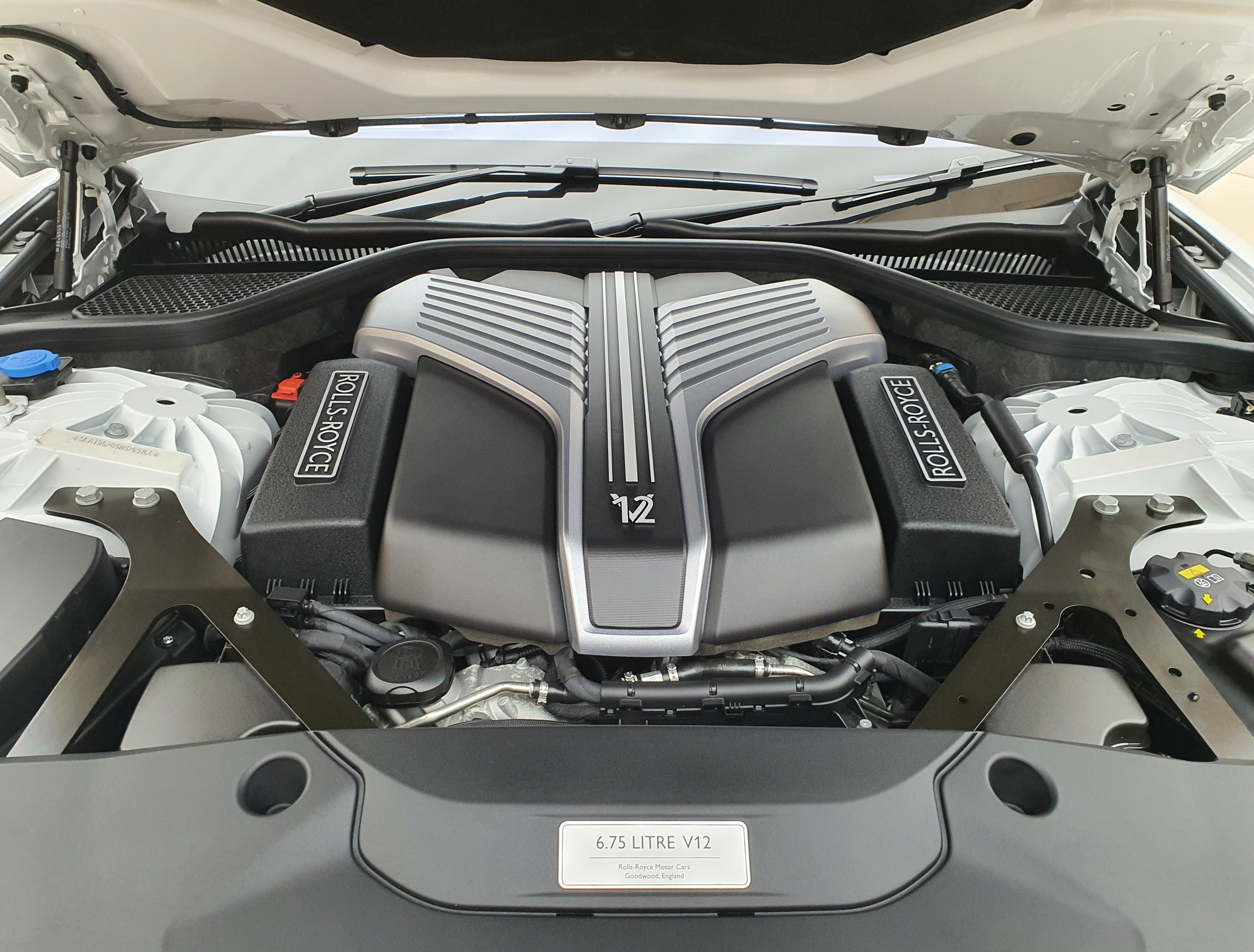
Rolls-Royce Ghost Black Badge 6.75 l. V12

== Specifications ==
=== First generation ===
==== Engines ====
The Rolls-Royce Ghost features a modified version of the BMW N74 V12 engine, called the N74B66.

Petrol engines
Model	Years	Type/code	Power@rpm, torque@rpm
Ghost	2009–	6,592 cc (402.3 cu in) V12 twin turbo (N74B66)	570 PS (419 kW; 562 hp)@5250, 780 N⋅m (575 lb⋅ft)@1500
Ghost Extended Wheelbase	2011–	6,592 cc (402.3 cu in) V12 twin turbo (N74B66)	570 PS (419 kW; 562 hp)@5250, 780 N⋅m (575 lb⋅ft)@1500

==== Transmissions ====
All models include a ZF 8-speed automatic gearbox.

==== Performance ====
The Ghost can accelerate from 0 to 60 mph (97 km/h) in 4.7 seconds, and has an electronically limited top speed of 155.3 mph (250 km/h).

=== 2013 model year update ===
==== Engines ====
Petrol engines
Model	Years	Type/code	Power@rpm, torque@rpm
Ghost	2012–2020	6,592 cc (402.3 cu in) V12 twin turbo (N74B66)	570 PS (419 kW; 562 hp)@5250, 780 N⋅m (575 lb⋅ft)@1500
Ghost Extended Wheelbase	2012–2020	6,592 cc (402.3 cu in) V12 twin turbo (N74B66)	570 PS (419 kW; 562 hp)@5250, 780 N⋅m (575 lb⋅ft)@1500
Ghost V-Specification	2014	6,592 cc (402.3 cu in) V12 twin turbo (N74B66)	600 PS (441 kW; 592 hp)@?, 780 N⋅m (575 lb⋅ft)?
Ghost Extended Wheelbase V-Specification	2014	6,592 cc (402.3 cu in) V12 twin turbo (N74B66)	600 PS (441 kW; 592 hp)@?, 780 N⋅m (575 lb⋅ft)?

=== 2014 model year update ===
==== Engines ====
Petrol engines
Model	Years	Type/code	Power@rpm, torque@rpm
Ghost (780Nm)	2014–2020	6,592 cc (402.3 cu in) V12 twin turbo (N74B66)	570 PS (419 kW; 562 hp)@5250, 780 N⋅m (575 lb⋅ft)@1500
Ghost Extended Wheelbase (780Nm)	2014–2020	6,592 cc (402.3 cu in) V12 twin turbo (N74B66)	570 PS (419 kW; 562 hp)@5250, 780 N⋅m (575 lb⋅ft)@1500
Ghost (820Nm)	2016–2020	6,592 cc (402.3 cu in) V12 twin turbo (N74B66)	570 PS (419 kW; 562 hp)@5250, 820 N⋅m (605 lb⋅ft)@1500
Ghost Extended Wheelbase (820Nm)	2016–2020	6,592 cc (402.3 cu in) V12 twin turbo (N74B66)	570 PS (419 kW; 562 hp)@5250, 820 N⋅m (605 lb⋅ft)@1500
Ghost Black Badge	2016–2020	6,592 cc (402.3 cu in) V12 twin turbo (N74B66)	612 PS (450 kW; 604 hp)@5250, 840 N⋅m (620 lb⋅ft)@1650–5000

==== Transmissions ====
Petrol engines
Model	Years	Type/code
Ghost (780Nm)	2014–2020	8-speed automatic (ZF 8HP90)
Ghost Extended Wheelbase (780Nm)	2014–2020	8-speed automatic (ZF 8HP90)
Ghost (820Nm)	2016–2020	8-speed automatic (ZF 8HP95)
Ghost Extended Wheelbase (820Nm)	2016–2020	8-speed automatic (ZF 8HP95)
Ghost Black Badge	2016–2020	8-speed automatic (ZF 8HPG95)

=== Second generation ===
==== Platform ====
This car shares the same platform as the Phantom VIII and the Cullinan SUV with its "Architecture of Luxury" (A.O.L) aluminium spaceframe chassis moving on from the BMW platform that the Ghost was on for Series I and II. The new spaceframe also generates significant weight savings.

==== Engines and transmission ====
Model	Years	Engine type	Power@rpm, torque@rpm	Fuel economy and emissions	Transmission
Ghost	2020–	6.75-litre V12 engine	563 hp (420 kW; 571 PS)@5250, 627 lb⋅ft (850 N⋅m)@1600 rpm	NEDC (combined): CO_{2} emission: 343 g/km; fuel consumption: 18.8 mpg_{‑imp} (15.0 L/100 km; 15.7 mpg_{‑US}) WLTP (combined): CO_{2} emission: 347-358 g/km; fuel consumption: 18–18.6 mpg_{‑imp} (15.7–15.2 L/100 km; 15.0–15.5 mpg_{‑US})	8-speed automatic
Ghost Extended Wheelbase	2021–	6.75-litre V12 engine	563 hp (420 kW; 571 PS) 850 N⋅m (627 lb⋅ft)@1600rpm	NEDC (combined): CO_{2} emission: 343 g/km; fuel consumption: 18.8 mpg_{‑imp} (15.0 L/100 km; 15.7 mpg_{‑US}) WLTP (combined): CO_{2} emission: 348-359 g/km; fuel consumption: 18–18.5 mpg_{‑imp} (15.7–15.3 L/100 km; 15.0–15.4 mpg_{‑US})	8-speed automatic

==== Performance ====
The second generation is capable of accelerating from 0 to 60 mph (97 km/h) in 4.3 seconds and from 0 to 100 mph (161 km/h) in 10.4 seconds. It has a top speed of 155 mph (249 km/h) and can complete the 1/4 mile (0.40 km) in 12.7 seconds.

== See also ==
- Rolls-Royce 100EX a one-off V16 convertible celebrating RR's 100th birthday
- Rolls-Royce 101EX, aka the Rolls-Royce Phantom Coupé (the production hardtop version of the 100EX)
- Rolls-Royce Phantom Drophead Coupé, also based heavily on the 100EX
- Rolls-Royce Wraith, a Rolls-Royce motor car based on a coupé version of the Ghost
