= BMW N74 =

BMW N74 engine
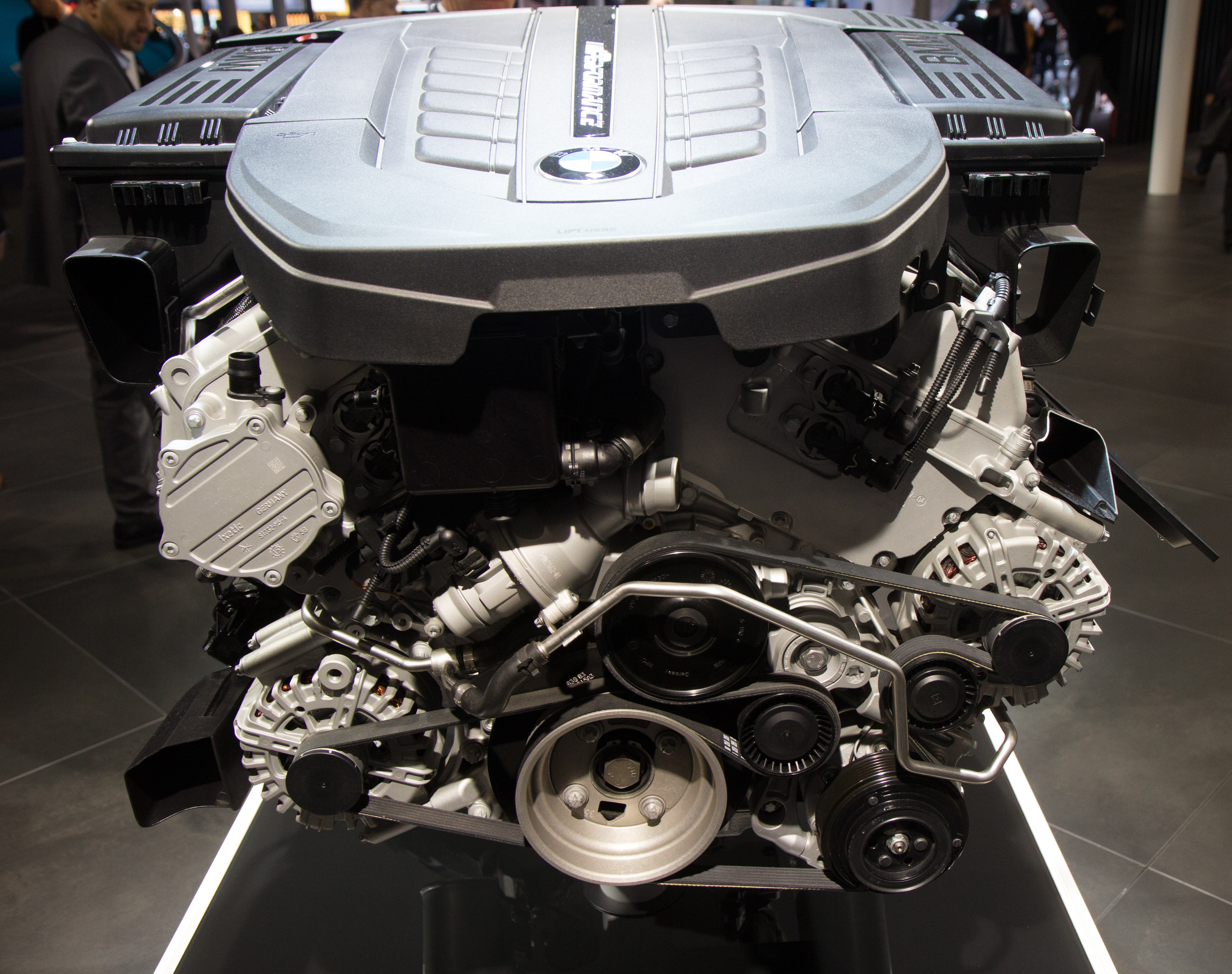
- Model of an N74

Overview
- Production: 2009–present

Layout
- Configuration: 60° V12
- Displacement: 6.0 L (5,972 cc) (2009–2015); 6.6 L (6,592 cc) (2009–2022); 6.7 L (6,749 cc)
- Cylinder bore: 89 mm (3.50 in)
- Piston stroke: 80 mm (3.15 in); 88.3 mm (3.48 in); 90.4 mm (3.56 in)
- Cylinder block material: Aluminium
- Cylinder head material: Aluminium
- Valvetrain: DOHC with VVT

Combustion
- Turbocharger: Twin-turbo
- Fuel type: Petrol

Output
- Power output: 400–465 kW (536–624 hp)
- Torque output: 750–900 N⋅m (553–664 lb⋅ft)

Chronology
- Predecessor: BMW N73

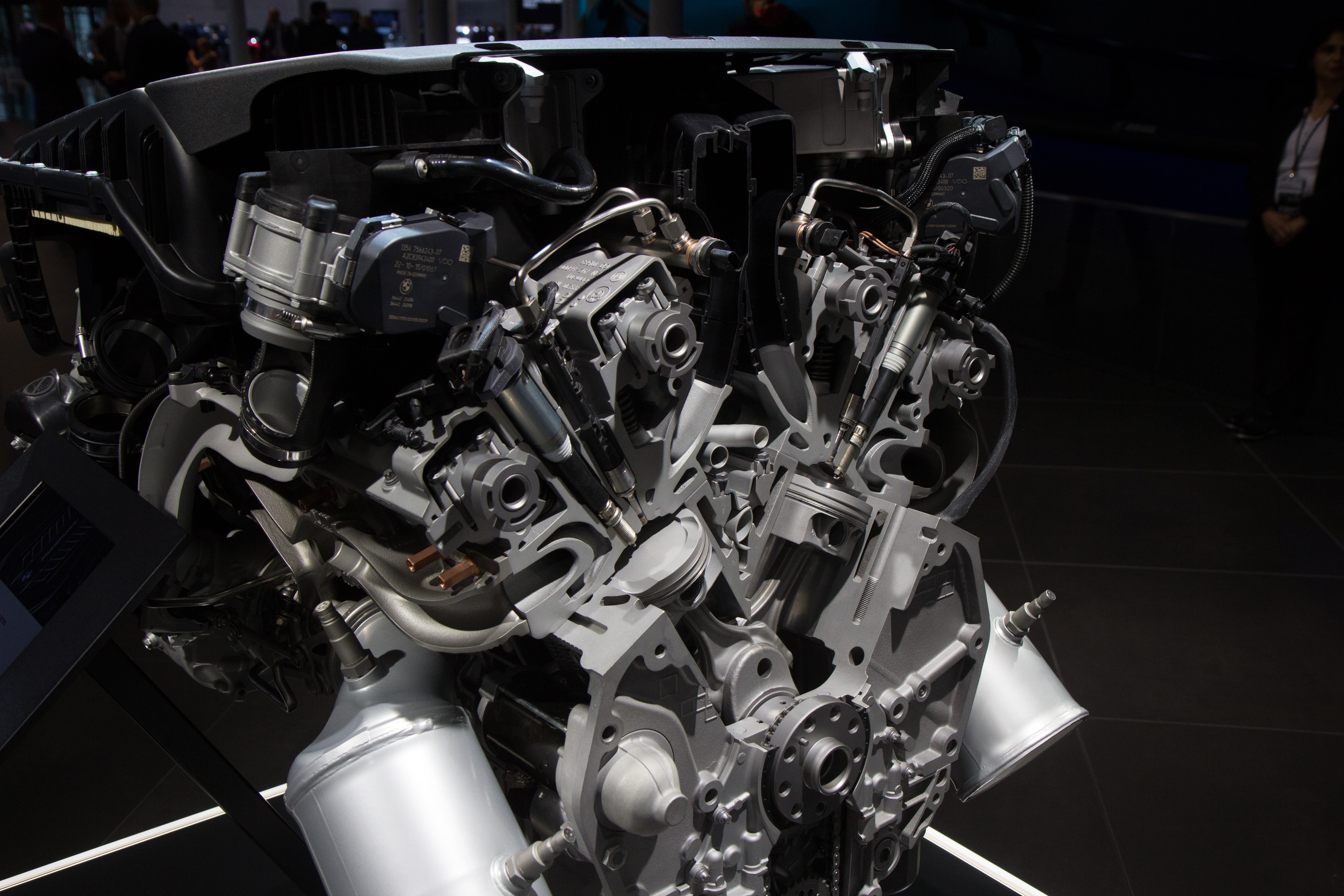
Cutaway view of N74

The BMW N74 is a twin-turbo V12 petrol engine which replaced the N73 and has been produced since 2008. It is BMW's first turbocharged V12 engine and is also used in several Rolls-Royce models.

== Design ==
The N74 features twin turbochargers, which are not present on its naturally aspirated BMW N73 predecessor. The turbochargers are located on the outside of the engine and use a boost pressure of 11.6 psi (0.8 bar). In its base configuration the engine has a compression ratio of 10:1 and a specific fuel consumption of 245 g·kW^{−1}·h^{−1}.

Like its predecessor, the N74 has direct injection, DOHC and variable valve timing (called double-VANOS by BMW). However, the N74 does not have variable valve lift (called Valvetronic by BMW).

The N74 marked BMW's first use of an 8-speed automatic transmission, in the form of the ZF 8HP90.

== Versions ==
Engine	Displacement	Power	Torque	Year
N74B60	5,972 cc (364.4 cu in)	400 kW (536 hp) at 5,250 rpm	750 N⋅m (553 lb⋅ft) at 1,500–5,000 rpm	2008–2015
N74B66	6,592 cc (402.3 cu in)	420 kW (563 hp) at 5,250 rpm	780 N⋅m (575 lb⋅ft) at 1,500–5,000 rpm	2009–2020
N74B66	6,592 cc (402.3 cu in)	465 kW (624 hp) at 5,600 rpm	800 N⋅m (590 lb⋅ft) at 1,500–5,500 rpm	2013–2022
N74B66	6,592 cc (402.3 cu in)	442 kW (593 hp) at 5,250 rpm	840 N⋅m (620 lb⋅ft) at 1,500 rpm	2016–2020
N74B66TU	6,592 cc (402.3 cu in)	449 kW (602 hp) at 5,500 rpm	800 N⋅m (590 lb⋅ft) at 1,500 rpm	2016–2019
N74B66TU	6,592 cc (402.3 cu in)	447.5 kW (600 hp) at 5,500 rpm	850 N⋅m (627 lb⋅ft) at 1,550 rpm	2020–2022
N74B68	6,750 cc (411.9 cu in)	420 kW (563 hp) at 5,250 rpm	900 N⋅m (664 lb⋅ft) at 1,500 rpm	2017–present

=== N74B60 ===
This initial version of the N74 has a bore of 89 mm (3.5 in) and a stroke of 80 mm (3.1 in). The redline is 7000 rpm and the compression ratio is 10.0:1.

Applications:

- 2009–2015 BMW F01/F02/F03 760i/760Li

=== N74B66 ===
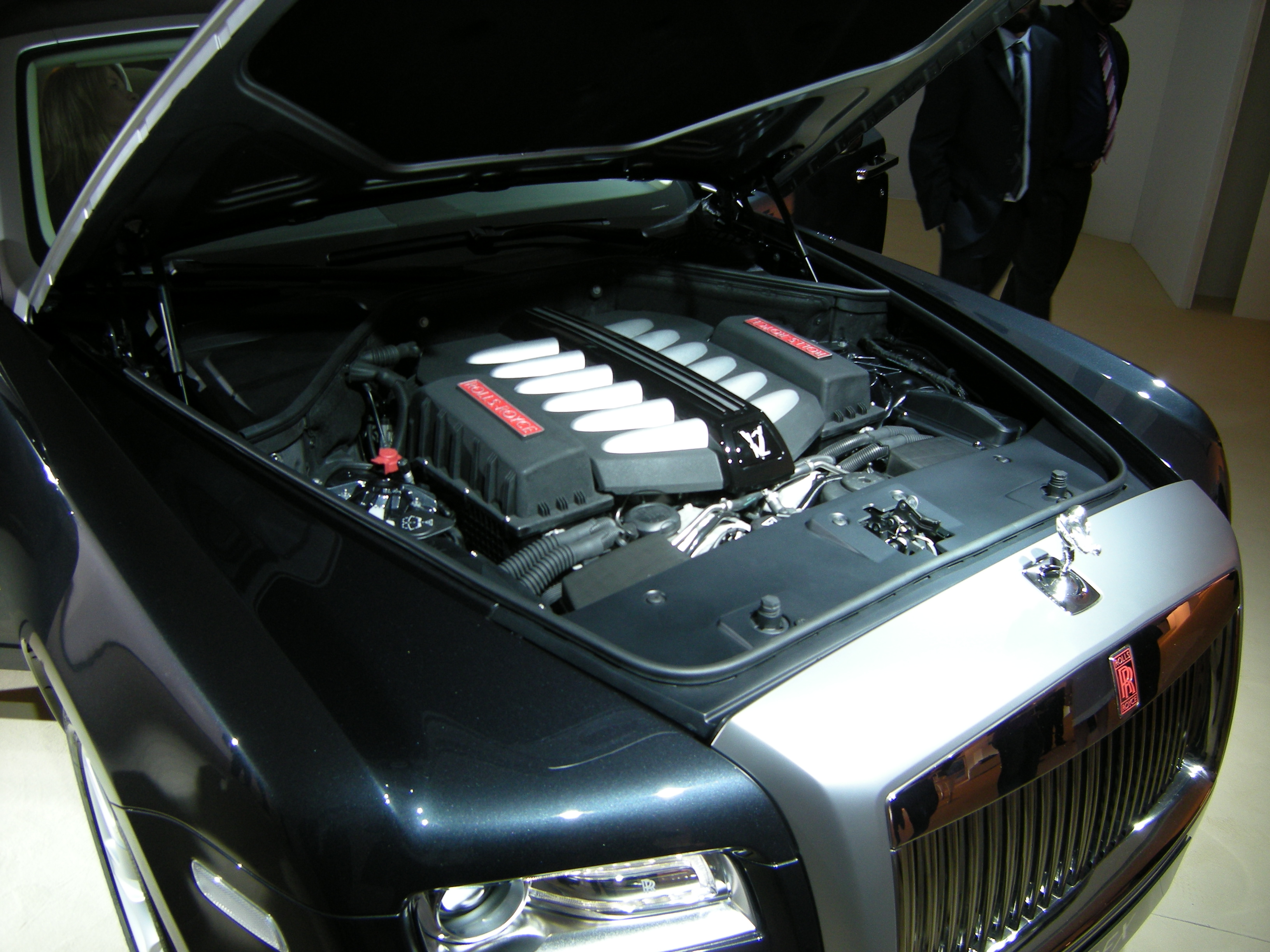
N74 in a Rolls Royce Ghost

The N74B66 is an enlarged version of the N74B60, due to a stroke of 88 mm (3.5 in). The redline is 7000 rpm and the compression ratio is 10.0:1. It produces up to 465 kW (624 hp) and is used in the Rolls-Royce Ghost.

Year	Application	Power output	Torque
2010–2020	Rolls-Royce Ghost	420 kW (563 hp)	780 N⋅m (575 lb⋅ft)
2014–2020	Rolls-Royce Ghost V-Specification	442 kW (593 hp)	780 N⋅m (575 lb⋅ft)
2019	Eadon Green Panthean Coupe	442 kW (593 hp)	840 N⋅m (619.5 lb⋅ft)
2014–2023	Rolls-Royce Wraith	465 kW (624 hp)	800 N⋅m (590 lb⋅ft)
2015–2023	Rolls-Royce Dawn	420 kW (563 hp)	820 N⋅m (605 lb⋅ft)

=== N74B66TU ===
2016 saw the introduction of the 6.6 liter N74 V12 variant to the BMW 7-series along with some Technical Updates (TU) for reliability. The facelifted 2020 models saw power reduced in the EU market to 430 kW (577 hp) due to the integration of Otto particle filters in the exhaust to meet emissions standards. This was partially compensated with an increase in torque to 850 N⋅m (627 lb⋅ft). US models enjoyed the bump in torque, with horsepower remaining close to the previous level at 600 bhp. Although the flagship 7-series was marked M760i in the USA and M760Li in some markets, all N74B66TU V12 powered 7-series were long wheelbase (G12); there was no short wheelbase (G11) variant offered worldwide.

Applications:

- 2016–2022 G12 M760Li xDrive

=== N74B68 ===
The 6.75 litre version was introduced in the 2018 Rolls-Royce Phantom. It is also used in the Rolls-Royce Cullinan and Rolls-Royce Ghost, both of which are built on the same platform as the new Phantom.

Applications:

- 2017–present Rolls-Royce Phantom VIII
- 2018–present Rolls-Royce Cullinan
- 2021–present Rolls-Royce Ghost
