= BMW N73 =

BMW N73 engine
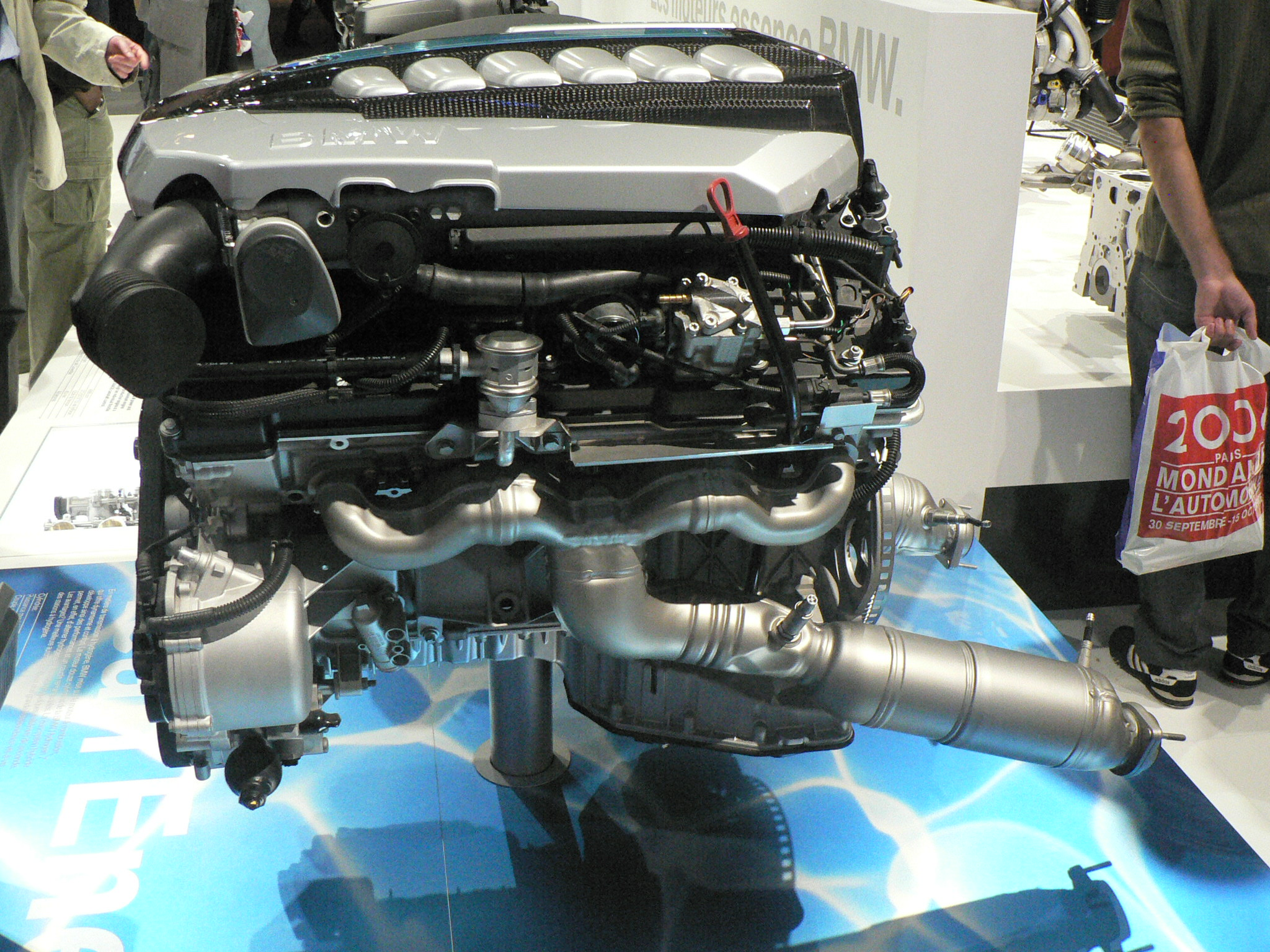

Overview
- Production: 2003–2016

Layout
- Configuration: 60° V12
- Displacement: 6.0 L (5,972 cc); 6.7 L (6,749 cc)
- Cylinder bore: 89 mm (3.50 in); 92 mm (3.62 in)
- Piston stroke: 80 mm (3.15 in); 84.6 mm (3.33 in)
- Valvetrain: DOHC w/ VVT & VVL

Combustion
- Fuel type: Petrol

Chronology
- Predecessor: BMW M73
- Successor: BMW N74

The BMW N73 is a naturally aspirated V12 petrol engine which replaced the BMW M73 and was produced from 2003–2016. It was used in the BMW 7 Series (E65) and Rolls-Royce Phantom VII.

The N73 was the world's first production V12 engine to use gasoline direct injection.

Compared with its M73 predecessor, the N73 has dual overhead camshafts, double-VANOS (variable valve timing) and valvetronic (variable valve lift).

== Design ==
The variable valve timing (VANOS) is a continuously variable design and is present on both the intake and exhaust camshafts. The VANOS units were designed as integral components of the chain drive, and the adjustment ranges are 63 degrees for the intake camshaft and 60 degrees for the exhaust camshaft. The redline for the N73 is 6,500 rpm.

The N73 engine also has variable valve lift (valvetronic), which varied intake valve opening lift from 0.30–9.85 mm (0.01–0.39 in), according to engine speed and load. Each cylinder head has a valvetronic assembly – including a motor, control module and position sensor.

The N73 was superseded by the BMW N74, a twin-turbocharged V12 engine.

== Versions ==
| Version | Year | Displacement | Power | Torque | Comp. ratio |
|---|---|---|---|---|---|
| N73B60 | 2003-2008 | 5,972 cc (364.4 cu in) | 327 kW (445 PS; 439 hp) at 6,000 rpm | 600 N⋅m (443 lb⋅ft) at 3,950 rpm | 11.3:1 |
| N73B68 | 2003-2016 | 6,749 cc (411.8 cu in) | 338 kW (460 PS; 453 hp) at 5,350 rpm | 720 N⋅m (531 lb⋅ft) at 3,500 rpm | 11.0:1 |

=== N73B60 ===
The 5,972 cc (364.4 cu in) version has a bore of 89 mm (3.50 in) and a stroke of 80 mm (3.15 in).

Application:

- 2003-2008 E65/E66 760i/760Li
- 2017 Eadon Green Black Cuillin

=== N73B68 ===
The 6,749 cc (411.8 cu in) version has a bore of 92 mm (3.62 in)and a stroke of 84.6 mm (3.33 in).

Application:

- 2003-2016 Rolls-Royce Phantom

== See also ==
- List of BMW engines
