= Albrecht von Goertz =

German automobile designer (1914–2006)

Albrecht Graf von Goertz, also known as Albrecht Goertz (German: Albrecht Graf von Schlitz genannt von Goertz und von Wrisberg; 12 January 1914 – 27 October 2006), was a German industrial designer who designed cars for BMW, including the BMW 503 and BMW 507. He also was an early contributor to the design of the legendary Toyota 2000GT and the first generation Nissan Silvia.

== Early life ==
He was born at Brunkensen in Lower Saxony, the second of three children of Rudolf Graf von Schlitz genannt von Goertz und von Wrisberg (1884–1933) and his wife, Else Meyer (1882–1968). Albrecht's mother was Jewish. His elder brother Eberhard died in 1951, and while Albrecht did not technically inherit the honorific, he began to call himself "The Count," and is often referred to that way.

After attending school, Goertz was apprenticed to Deutsche Bank in Hamburg and then in London at a private bank, Helbert Wagg & Co, but his prospects were not good, so he immigrated to the United States of America in 1936. He eventually moved to Los Angeles, where he worked at a car wash and in a factory making aircraft engines. In 1938, Goertz rented a garage and showroom, and he modified Ford Model A and B models. On a Mercury chassis, he built a two-door coupe called the "Paragon". This was exhibited in 1939 at the World Exhibition in New York City.

== Studebaker and BMW designs ==
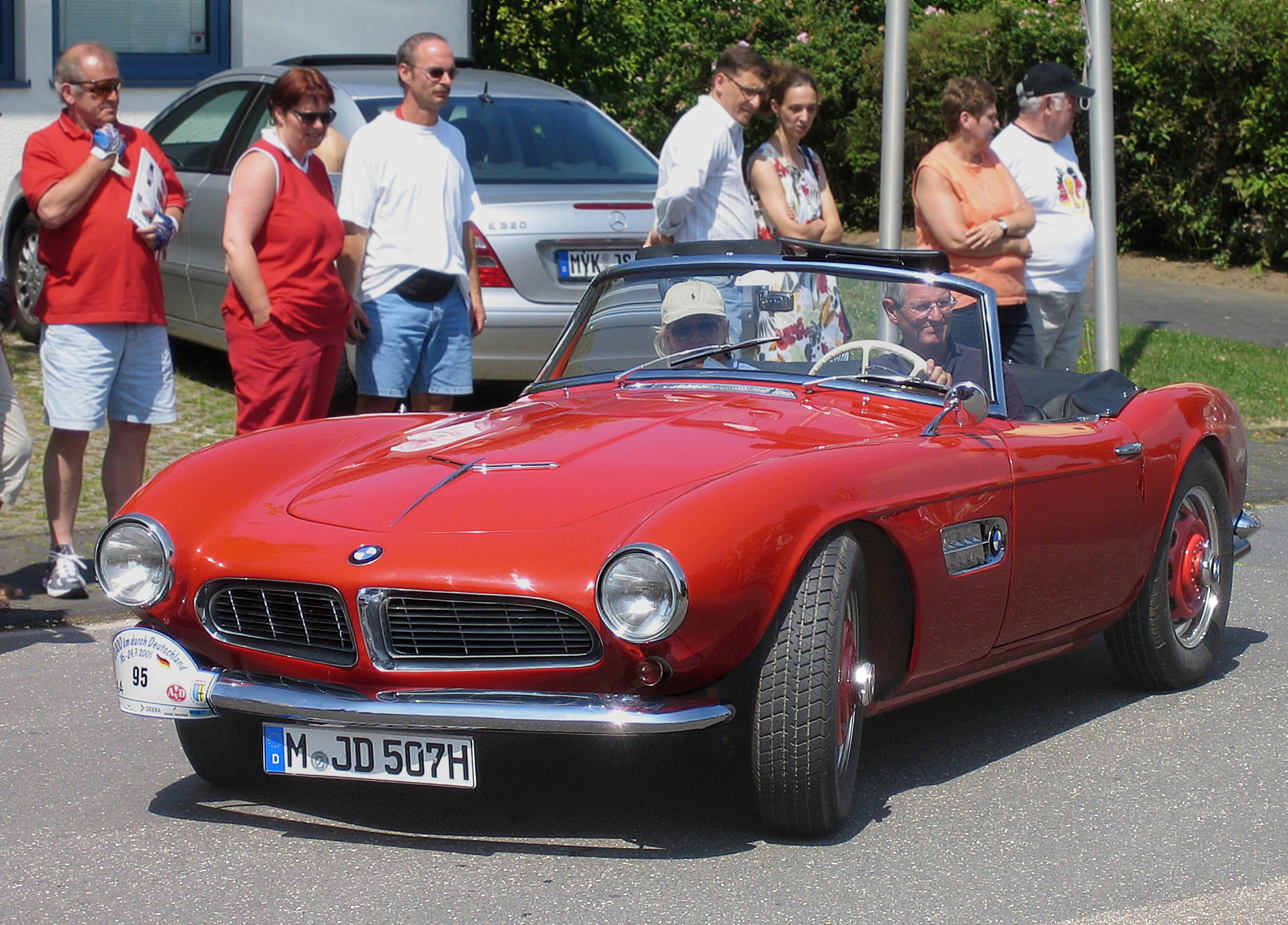
The BMW 507, designed by Albrecht von Goertz.

Goertz joined the US Army in 1940 and served for five years. After leaving the army, he drove the Paragon to New York City and, while driving it, he accidentally encountered Raymond Loewy, the famous car designer. Loewy invited Goertz to his office, sent him to college to learn about design, and later gave him a job at the Studebaker studio in Indiana.

In 1953, Goertz set up his own design business and got to know Max Hoffman, BMW's main importer in America. Hoffman knew of BMW's plans to build a sports car and suggested that Goertz should contact BMW in Munich. Goertz then designed the BMW 503 and the BMW 507, both in 1955.

== Other car designs ==
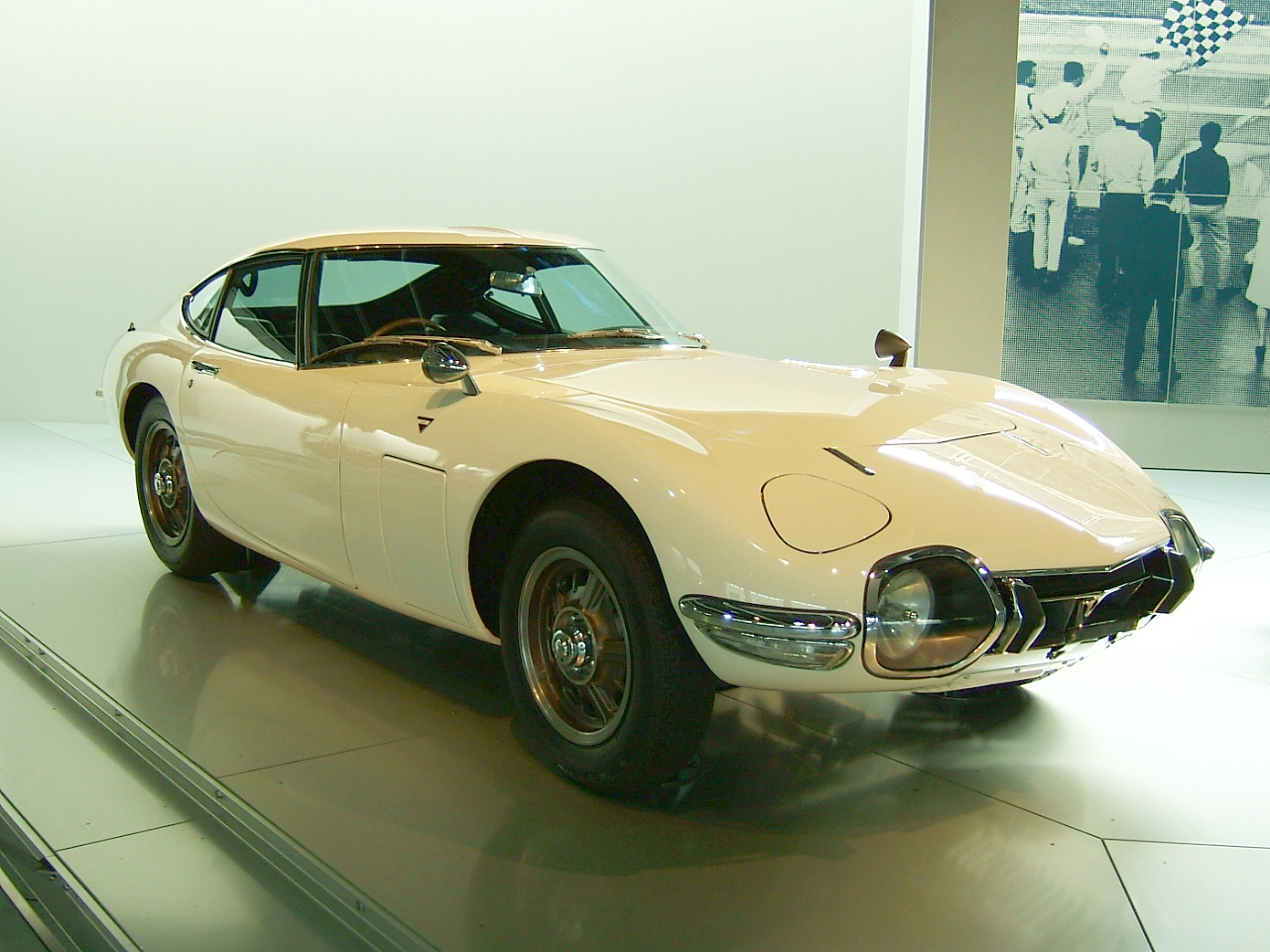
The Japanese stereotype-shattering Toyota 2000GT gran turismo

Goertz claimed that he worked for Porsche, although this 'work' seems to have been an unsolicited 'design' submission for the 901, which was rejected. However, he was employed as a consultant to Nissan – visiting the factory intermittently over a limited period, mainly to instruct in full-size clay modelling. He also carried out consultation work on a two-seater sports car project for Nissan, called the Project "A550X" which became the Datsun Coupe 1500 and debuted as the Nissan Silvia CSP311. Goertz then worked with Nissan, in collaboration with company technical partner Yamaha Motor Company, to develop a world-class sports car. By the time the prototype was ready for display in 1965, Nissan had abandoned the project, leaving partner Yamaha to offer the car to Toyota, then perceived as the most conservative of the Japanese car manufacturers. Looking to add its own touch to what became the iconic 2000GT, Toyota tasked designer Satoru Nozaki to finalize the car's narrow-waisted shape, clearly influenced by British and Italian gran turismo designs of the day.

Goertz's last design was a grand piano for Steinway & Sons to celebrate the 125th anniversary of their Hamburg factory.

== Personal life ==
Goertz married Julie Freiin von Bodenhausen (1902–1951), but they separated in 1942. He then married Susanne Nettel (b. 1925) in 1957 and they had a son, Peter Joseph, who was born in 1959.
