= Max Hoffman House =

Residence in Rye, New York

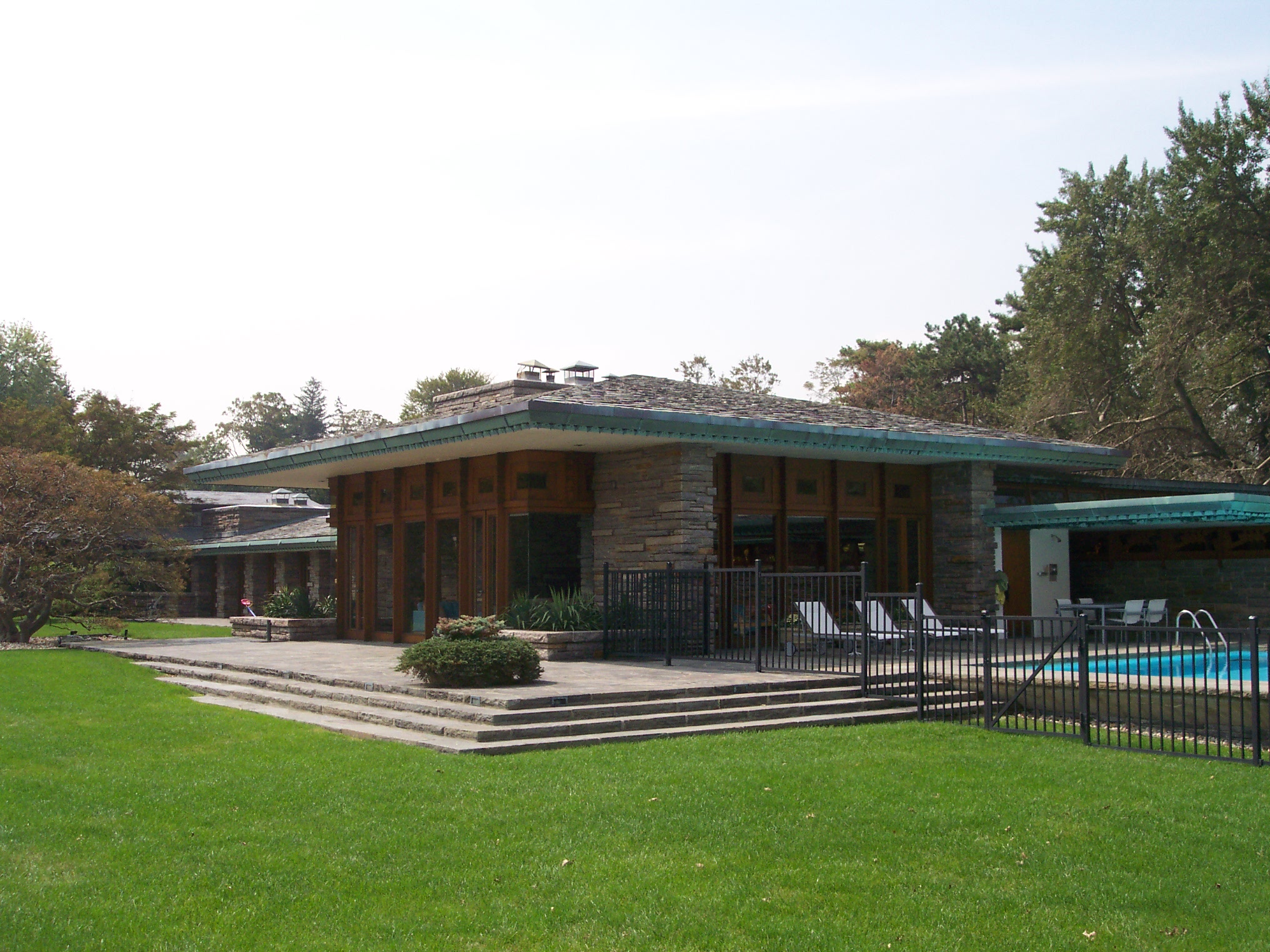
- Interactive map of the Max Hoffman House area

General information
- Type: House
- Architectural style: Modern architecture
- Location: 58 Island Drive, Rye, New York
- Coordinates: 40.982006°N 73.658247°W
- Construction started: 1955

Design and construction
- Architect: Frank Lloyd Wright

Max Hoffman House is a Frank Lloyd Wright designed waterfront home in Rye, New York, United States, built in 1955 for European automobile importer Max Hoffman. Hoffman had commissioned Wright to design the Hoffman Auto Showroom for his Jaguar dealership at 430 Park Avenue in New York City in 1954. The following year, Wright designed a large single-story L-shaped home and garden for the Hoffmans on the shore of North Manursing Island overlooking Long Island Sound.

The Max Hoffman House was purchased in 1972 by Emily Fisher Landau, who sold it in 1993 to Tom & Alice Tisch (son and daughter-in-law of former CBS president and CEO Laurence Tisch). In 2019 the house was sold to fashion designer Marc Jacobs for $9.175 million.

Constructed of stone and plaster, with a slate roof and a copper-trimmed fascia, the 5,791 sq ft (538.0 m^{2}) single-story home sits on a 1.97-acre lot and features a Japanese-style garden designed by Stephen Morrell, curator of the John P. Humes Japanese Stroll Garden in Locust Valley, New York. In 1972 Taliesin Associated Architects built an additional wing to the north. An interior renovation in 1995 was designed by architect Emanuela Frattini Magnusson.

== See also ==
- List of Frank Lloyd Wright works
