= Bertone Birusa =

Concept car designed by Bertone

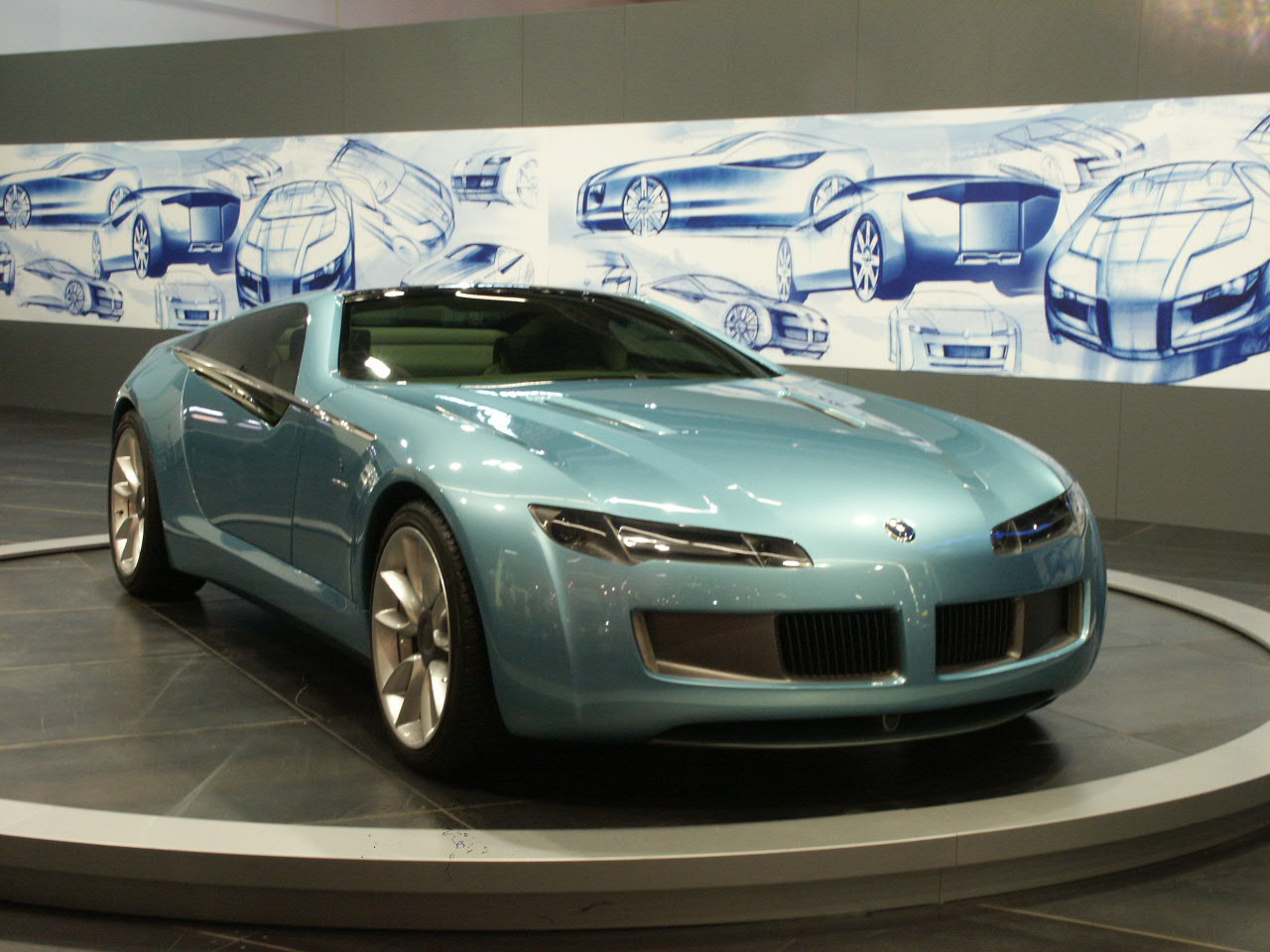

Overview
- Manufacturer: Bertone, using a BMW motor and chassis
- Production: 2003
- Designer: Giuliano Biasio at Bertone

Body and chassis
- Class: Concept car
- Body style: 2-door coupe
- Layout: FR layout
- Doors: Gullwing doors
- Related: BMW Z8

Powertrain
- Engine: 4.9 L V8
- Power output: 400 bhp (298 kW; 406 PS)
- Transmission: 6-speed manual

Dimensions
- Length: 440 cm (173 in)
- Width: 190 cm (75 in)

The Bertone Birusa is a concept car built in 2003 by Bertone and based on the BMW Z8. It debuted at the 2003 Geneva Motor Show. It was intended solely as a styling exercise and never went into production, neither intended to be supplied to any automobile producer, neither BMW, just a show car to gain projects.

== Specifications ==
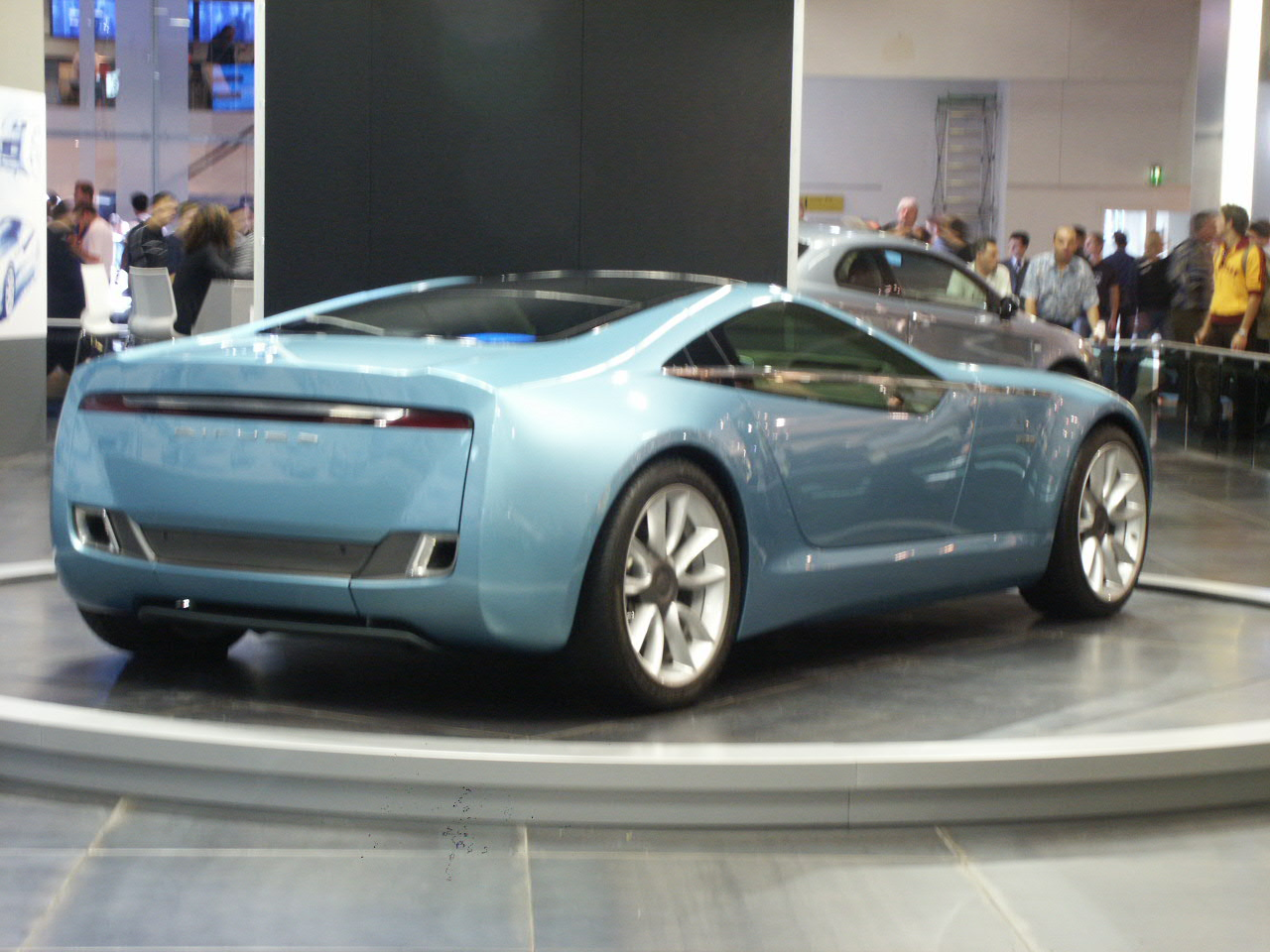
Rear view

The Birusa uses the Z8's aluminum chassis, as well as its 4.9-liter DOHC V8 engine that produces 400 bhp (298 kW; 406 PS) at 6600 rpm and 370 lb⋅ft (502 N⋅m) of torque mated to a 6-speed manual transmission. It features power assisted, roof hinged carbon fibre gull-wing doors, as well as a custom Bose sound system designed especially for the Birusa with 11 speakers and 2 subwoofers. The Birusa had many new technological advances such as a glass sunroof that filters out 95% of UV rays from the passengers of the car and a multilingual voice control system that allows the driver to control many features. It also was equipped with a night vision system. The Birusa has a large moonroof which doubles as its rear windscreen. The whole piece can be stowed electronically in the trunk by a button on the interior.

== Segway HT ==
The Birusa concept was paired with the Segway HT (Human Transporter), a segway scooter of Bertone's own design. The two are designed to work together and the Segway similar to the way Honda engineered the Honda City and Honda Motocompo. The trunk of the Birusa folds outwards to create a ramp for the Segway HT. The Segway itself was upholstered in Alcantara, like the interior of the Birusa, and featured its own Bose sound system, onboard navigation and headlights.
