= BMW 507 =

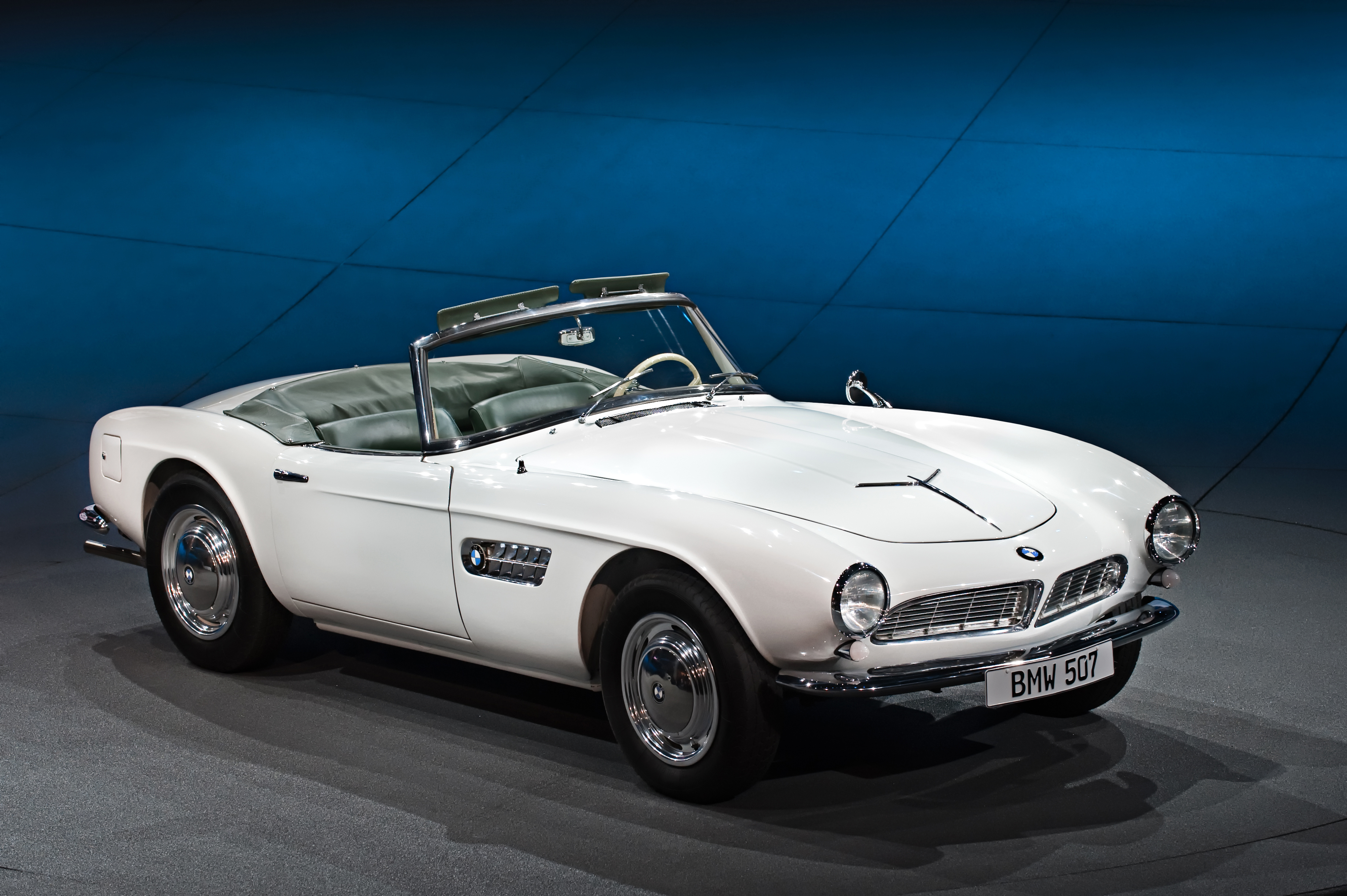
- BMW 507 at the 2009 Frankfurt Motor Show

Overview
- Manufacturer: BMW
- Production: 1956–1959; 252 units built
- Assembly: Germany: Bavaria, Milbertshofen
- Designer: Albrecht von Goertz

Body and chassis
- Class: Grand tourer
- Body style: 2-door convertible / Detachable hardtop
- Layout: Front-engine, rear-wheel drive
- Related: BMW 503

Powertrain
- Engine: 3.2 L (3,168 cc) M507/1 V8
- Transmission: 4-speed ZF manual

Dimensions
- Wheelbase: 2,480 mm (97.6 in)
- Length: 4,380 mm (172.4 in)
- Width: 1,650 mm (65.0 in)
- Height: 1,257 mm (49.5 in)
- Kerb weight: 1,330 kg (2,932 lb)

Chronology
- Predecessor: BMW 328
- Successor: BMW 3200 CS; BMW Z8 (spiritual)

The BMW 507 is a luxury grand touring convertible that was produced by German automobile manufacturer BMW from 1956 until 1959. Originally planned for export to the United States at thousands per year, the car proved too costly, leading to just 252 units produced and major financial losses for BMW. Decades later, however, at least three dozen surviving examples became highly coveted at public auctions, making them the most valuable BMWs ever built in the brand's 100+ year history.

== Development ==
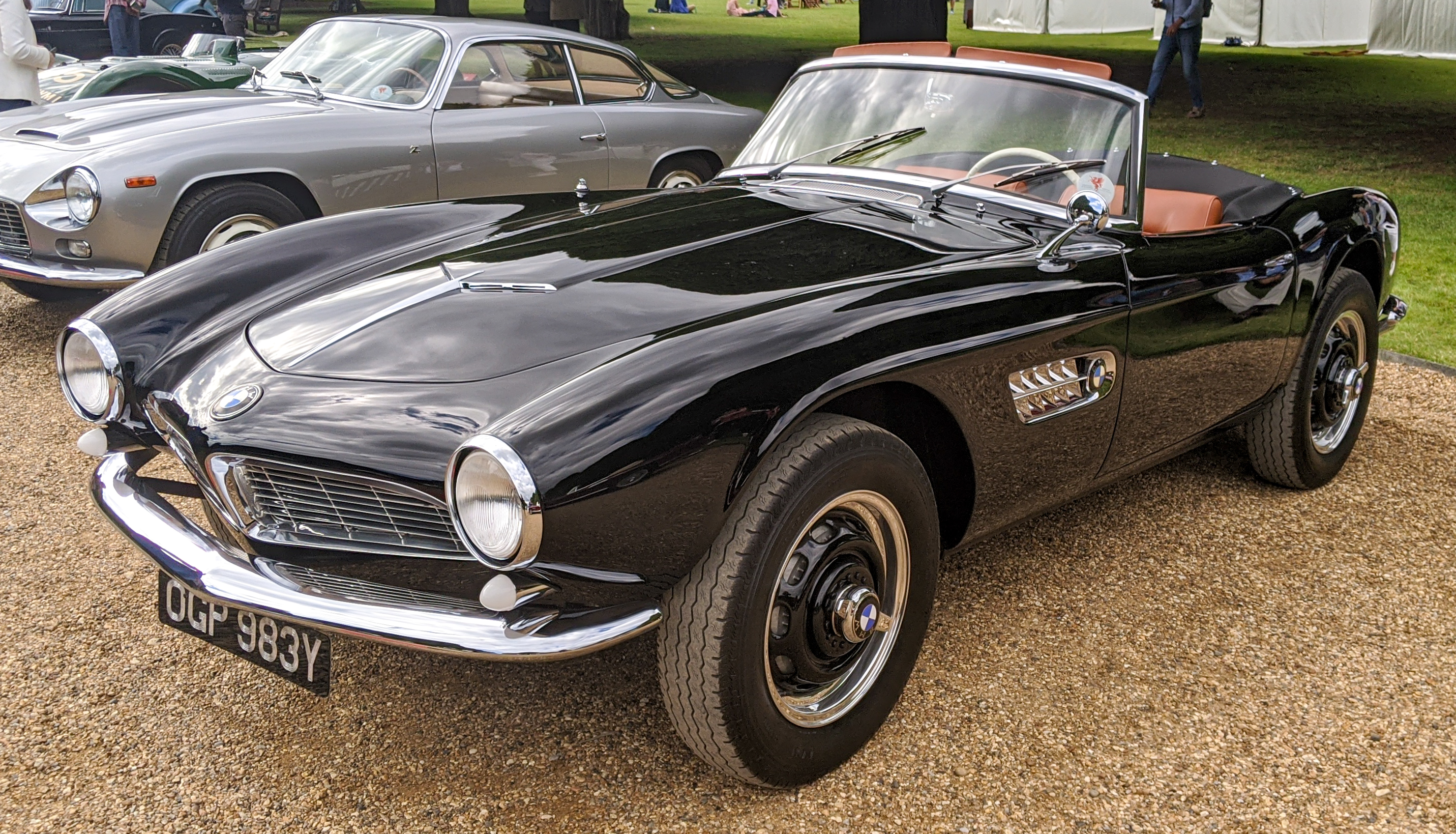
Front 3/4-view

The BMW 507 was conceived by American automobile importer Max Hoffman who, in 1954, persuaded the BMW management to produce a roadster version of the BMW 501 and BMW 502 saloons to fill the gap between the expensive Mercedes-Benz 300SL and the cheap and underpowered Triumph and MG sports cars. BMW engineer Fritz Fiedler was assigned to design the rolling chassis, using existing components wherever possible. Early body designs by Ernst Loof were rejected by Hoffman, who found them to be unappealing. In November 1954, at Hoffman's insistence, BMW contracted designer Albrecht von Goertz to design the BMW 503 and the 507.

Thirty-four Series I 507s were built in 1956 and early 1957. These cars had welded aluminium fuel tanks of 110 litres (29.1 US gal) capacity behind the rear seats. These large tanks limited both boot space and passenger space, and gave off the smell of fuel inside the car when the soft top was up or the hardtop was in place. Series II and later 507s had fuel tanks of 66 litres (17.4 US gal) capacity under the boot, shaped around the space for the spare tyre.

== Specifications ==
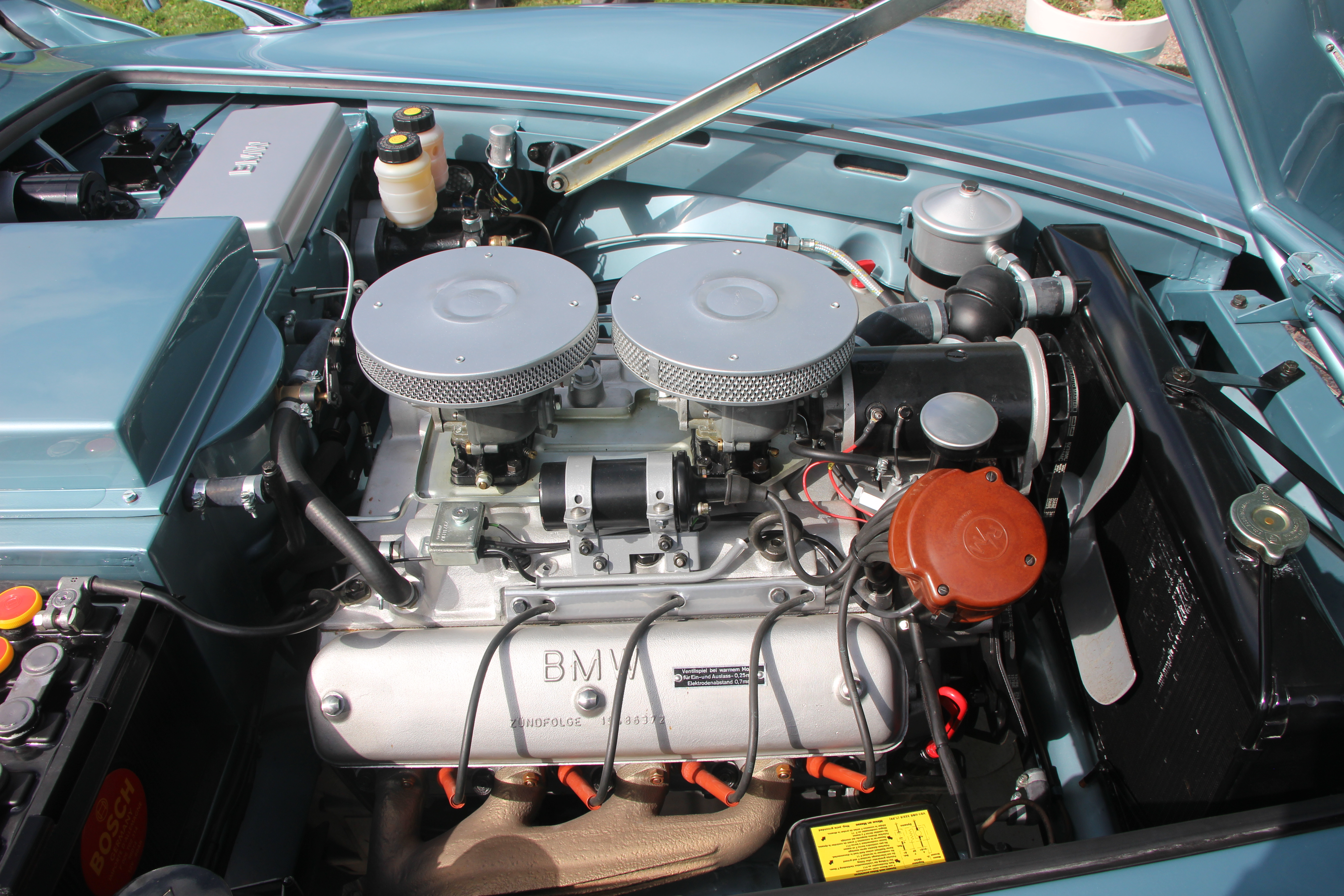
The 507's 3.2 litre V8 engine

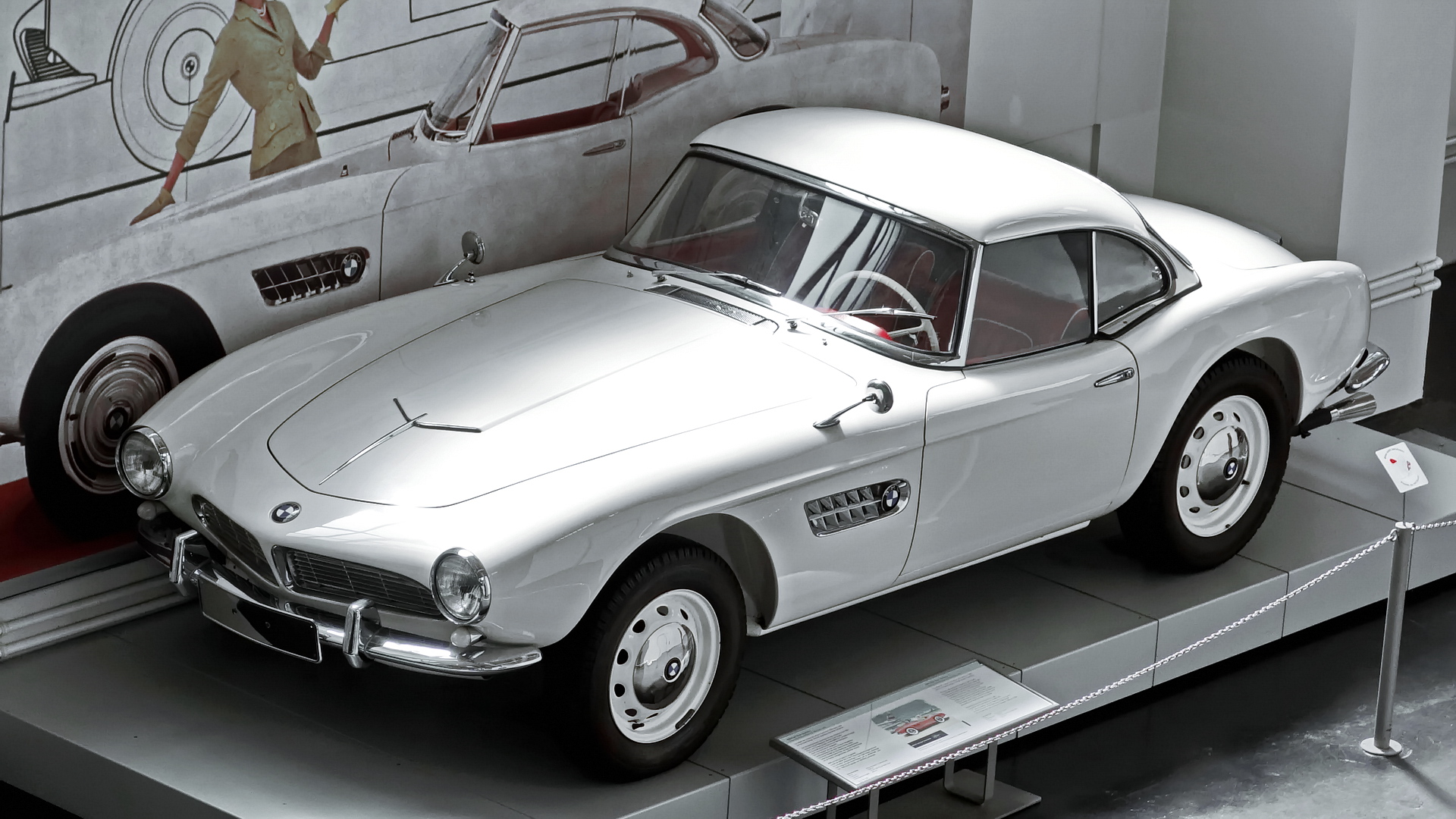
BMW 507 with optional detachable hardtop

The 507's frame is a shortened 503 frame, the wheelbase having been reduced from 2,835 mm (111.6 in) to 2,480 mm (97.6 in). The chassis was also made of thicker-gauge steel up from 1.75 mm originally to 2.5 mm. This change was necessitated due to large amounts of flexing in early development mules. Overall length amounted to 4,385 mm (172.6 in), and overall height is 1,257 mm (49.5 in). Curb weight was about 1,330 kilograms (2,930 lb). The body was almost entirely hand-formed of aluminium, and no two cars were exactly the same.

The front suspension has parallel double wishbones with torsion bar springs and an anti-roll bar. The rear suspension has a live axle, also sprung by torsion bars, and located by a Panhard rod and a central, transverse A-arm to control acceleration and braking forces. The brakes were Alfin drum brakes of 284.5 mm (11.2 in) diameter. Power brakes were optional. Late-model 507s had front Girling disc brakes and Pirelli 185VR16 Cinturato radial tyres.

The engine is an aluminium alloy OHV V8, of 3,168 cc (3.2 L; 193.3 cu in) displacement, with pushrod-operated overhead valves. It has two Zenith 32NDIX two-barrel carburetors, a chain-driven oil pump, high-lift cams, a different spark advance curve, polished combustion chamber surfaces, and a compression ratio of 7.8:1, yielding 150 PS (110 kW) DIN at 5,000 rpm. The engine is mated to a close ratio four-speed manual transmission. The standard rear-end ratio was 3.70:1, but ratios of 3.42:1 and 3.90:1 were optional. A contemporary road test of a 507 with the standard 3.70:1 final drive was reported in Motor Revue, stating a 0–100 km/h (0–62 mph) acceleration time of 11.1 seconds and a top speed of 122 mph (196.3 km/h).

== Introduction and impact ==
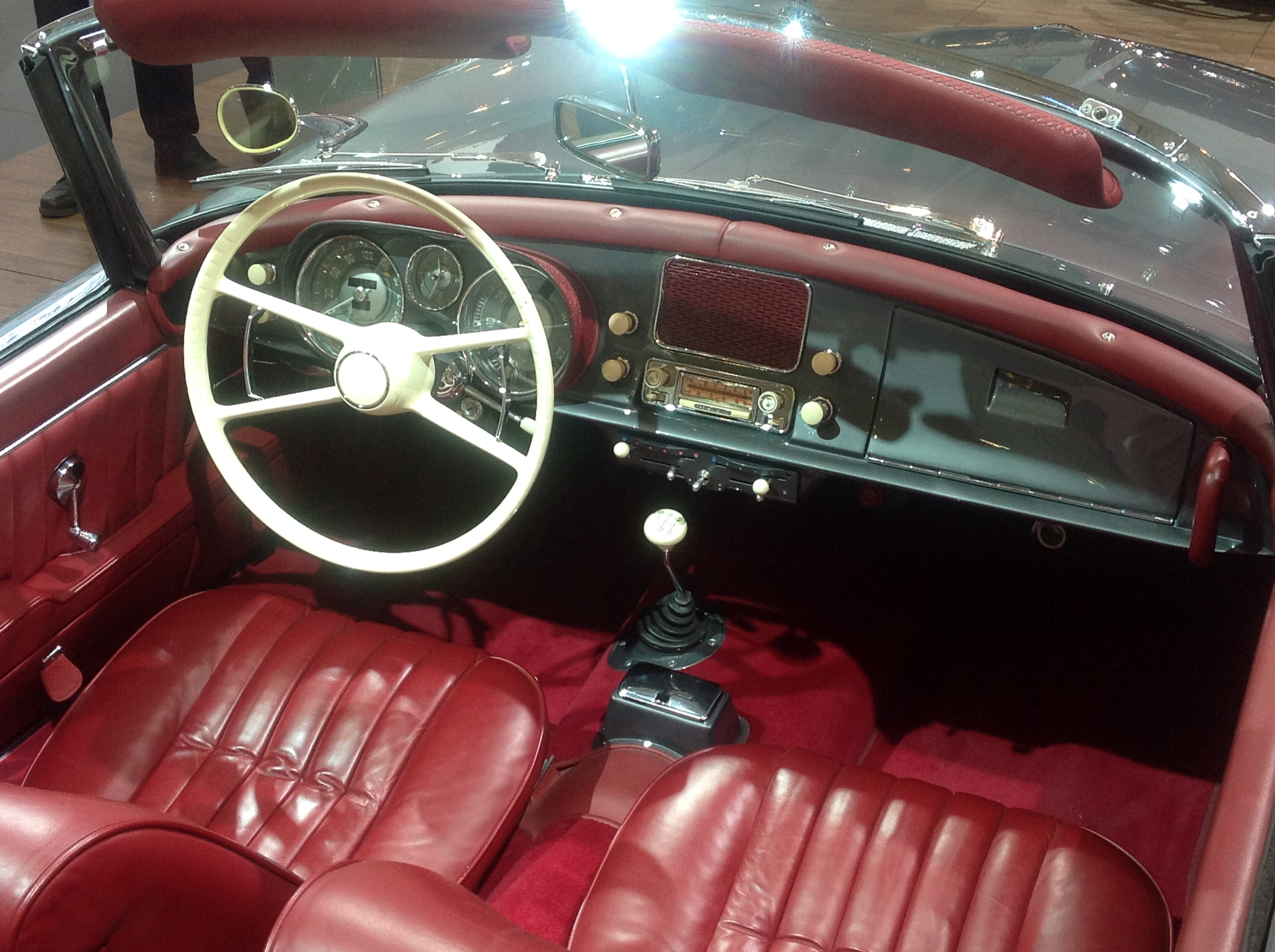
Interior

The 507 made its debut at the Waldorf-Astoria Hotel in New York in the summer of 1955. Production began in November 1956. Hoffman intended the 507 to sell for about $5,000, which he believed would allow a production run of 5,000 units a year. Instead, high production costs pushed the price in Germany to DM 26,500 then DM 29,950. (Note: Mercedes-Benz 300SL was DM 32,500.) This drove the U.S. price initially to $9,000 then ultimately $10,500 ($117,200 today). Some of the prominent buyers were Elvis Presley, who owned one and five years later gifted another (a 1958 model to actress Ursula Andress), actors Fred Astaire, who bought his 1957 model from Andress' husband John Derek, Alain Delon , aeronautical entrepreneur Count Agusta, as well as King Constantine II of Greece, Prince Rainier of Monaco and champion racers, Hans Stuck, John Surtees, who received his, in 1957, as a gift from Count Agusta and Georg "Schorsch" Meier. Despite the celebrity owners, the 507 did not reach more than 10% of the sales volume achieved by Mercedes-Benz 300SL.

BMW had intended for 507 to revive the company's sporting image, but the higher production cost led the company to the verge of bankruptcy. BMW lost money on each 507 built and resulted in the company's losses of DM 15 million for 1959. The company's losses led to the capital infusion from Herbert Quandt in order to prevent the bankruptcy. The launch of the new models, BMW 700 and 'New Class' 1500 helped the company recover financially.

Only 252 plus two prototypes were built before the production was terminated in 1959.

== Legacy ==
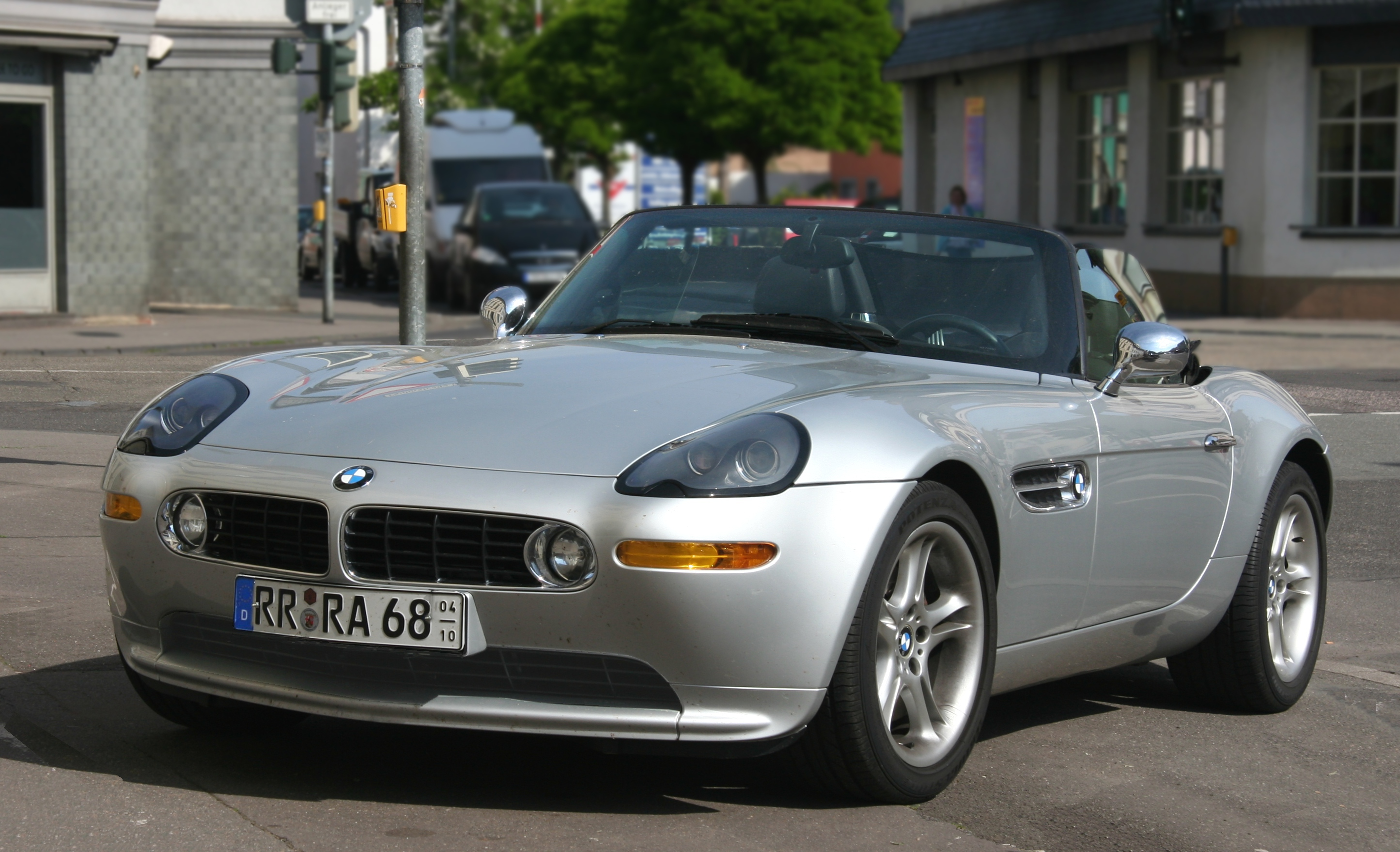
BMW Z8, with 507-inspired front grilles and side vents

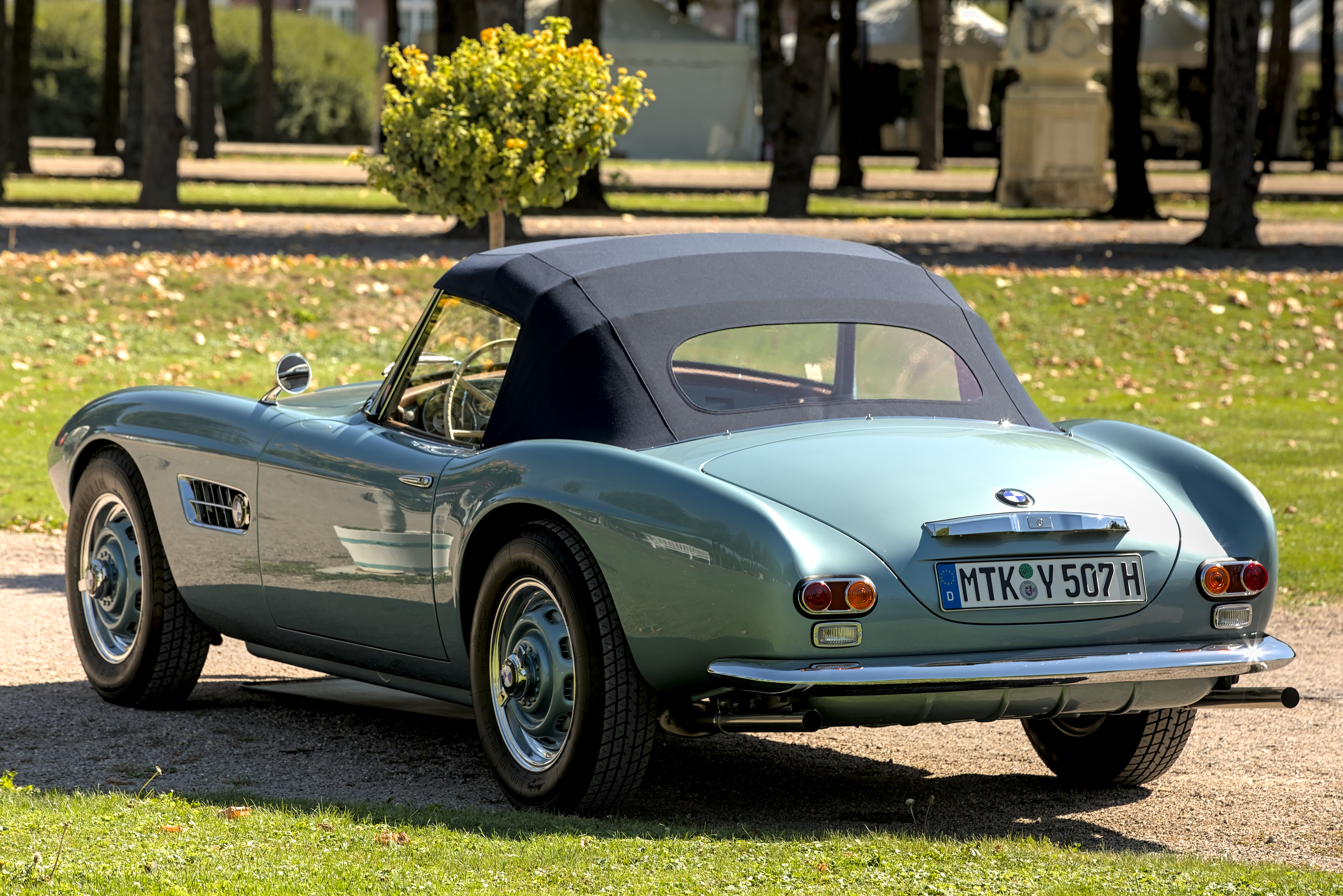
Rear 3/4-view

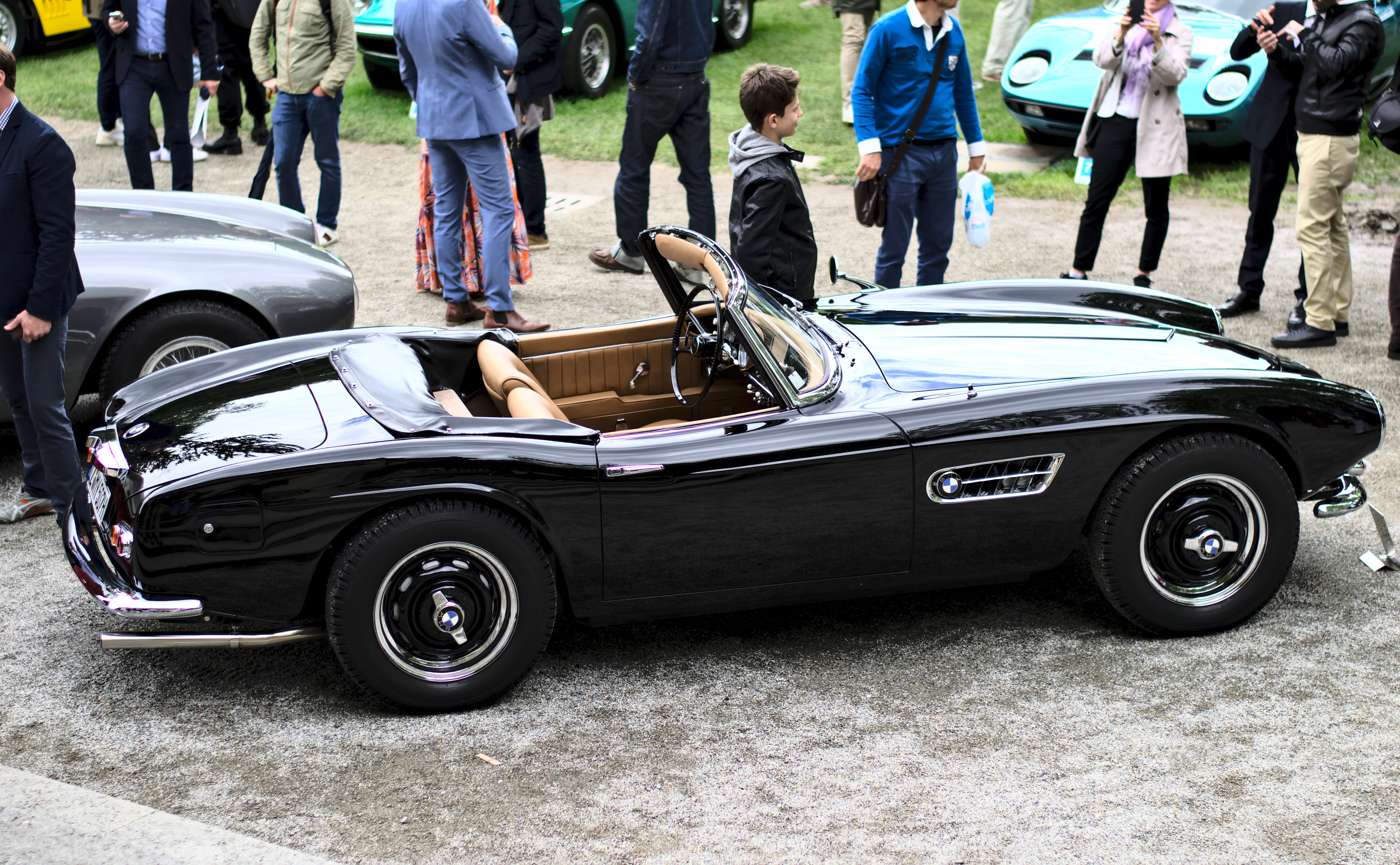
Side top view of a BMW 507 softtop with roof down

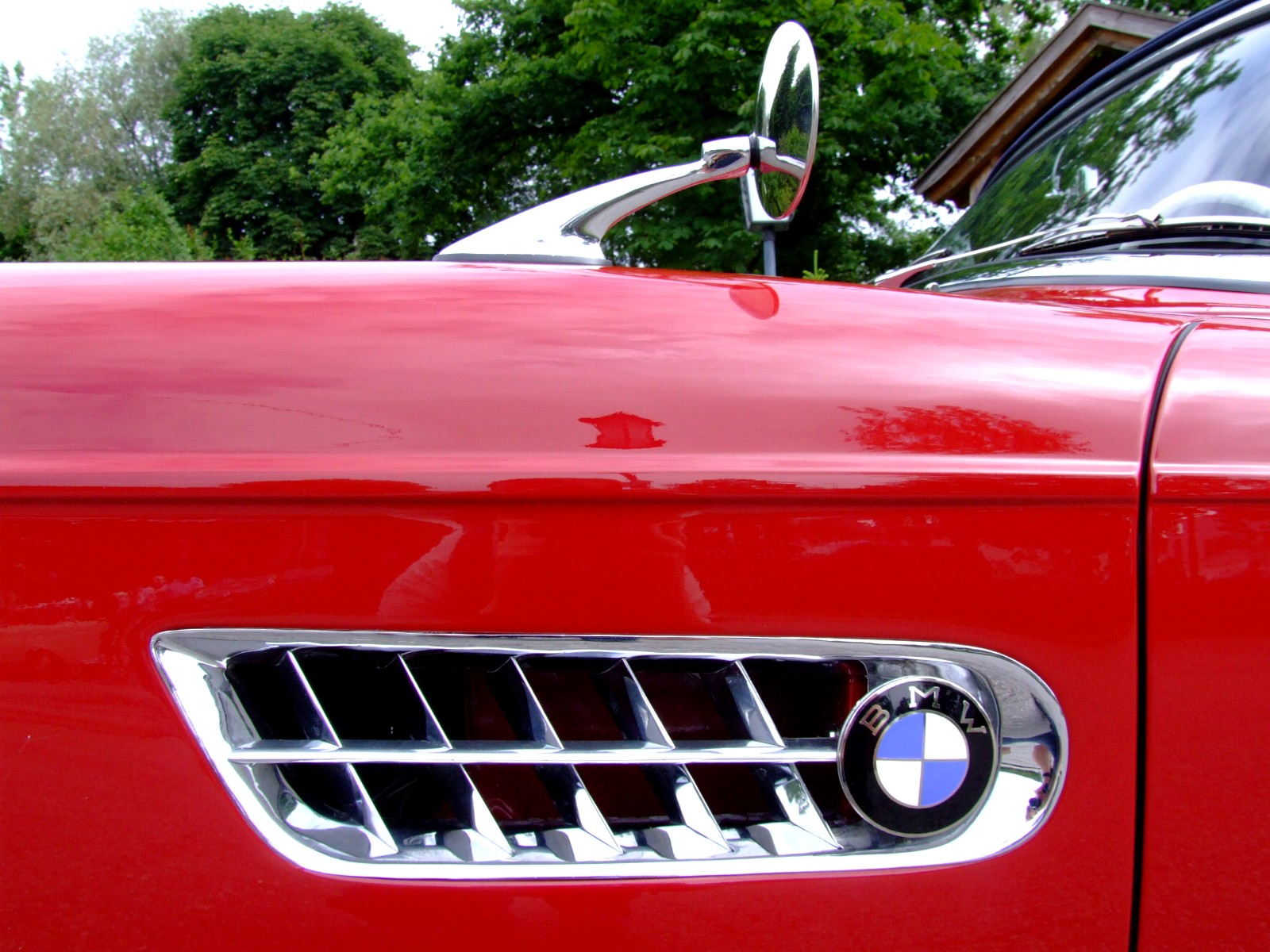
Detail on front fender/wing

The styling of the 507 later influenced the Z3, the Z4, and, most noticeably, the Z8, with its chromed side vents and horizontal front grilles. The 507 remains a milestone model for its attractive styling. 202 507s are known to survive.

=== Notable owners ===
As mentioned above, Elvis Presley, while stationed in Germany on duty with the US Army, bought his first 507, a 1957 model (chassis #70079 and colored feather white), which had been raced by Hans Stuck, used as a press demonstrator by BMW, and appeared in a German musical comedy entitled Hula-Hopp, Conny (released in March 1959). Because many of his European fans left lipstick marks on the car, mainly while parked outside his home at 14 Goethestrasse, in Bad Nauheim, he had it painted red. Just before Presley's return to the US, it was imported into the United States in 1960 and bought by Alabama singer and disc jockey Tommy Charles, who became even better known in the US, a few years later for being the prime mover in the inflating of the infamous More popular than Jesus Beatles controversy. Charles had 70079 extensively modified, including having the engine replaced with a Chevrolet V8. In 1962, it was painted black and its interior changed to red, only to again be painted red, which is how it remained for the next 50 years. In July 2014, BMW Group announced that Presley's car would be on display for a short period at the BMW Museum in Munich, before being entirely restored by its Classic department. This fully restored car, now back to its original white color, was displayed in the newly renovated BMW Zentrum museum at their US manufacturing center in Greer, South Carolina, and is now on display, with its own particular interactive exhibit at the BMW Museum in Munich., According to press reports emanating from the Norwegian authorities which handled the car's exhibit at the Oslo Motor held from 28 to 31 October 2022, the car is now valued at 180 Norwegian Kroner, or approximately $16.8m, the highest valuation for any BMW.

In 1963, Presley reportedly bought, as a gift, a 1958 model (chassis #70192) to Ursula Andress, who starred with him that year in Fun in Acapulco. (Note: Andress told Bimmer magazine that Elvis gave her the car, while RM Auctions says there is no known documentation of Elvis giving Andress the car.) Andress's husband, John Derek, who had owned another 507 ( a 1957 model, chassis # 70044) then just sold it to entertainer Fred Astaire, had the 507 that Elvis gave his wife specially customized, which included changing its color from white to light blue, as well as having the engine replaced with a Ford 289 V8. Andress sold the car in 1997 to George Barris for US$300,000. The car was then again restored with a correct drivetrain by a later owner. When the car arrived at McDougall's Carrera Automotive it had also been repainted black. The original engine was lost to time but two 503 V8s were located along with the dual carburetor intake from a 507. Both engines were made into a running engine with BMW AG making a new engine gasket kit including head gaskets at a cost of US$25,000. It was also returned to its original white color and subsequently sold at auction for US$350,000 and at a later auction in 2011 for US$1,072,500.

Bernie Ecclestone's 507 fetched £430,238 (US$904,000) at an auction in London in October 2007. At the Amelia Island Concours in March, 2014, a 507 sold at auction for $2.4 million.

John Surtees was given a 507 by Count Agusta for winning the 1956 500cc World Motorcycle Championship on an MV Agusta. Surtees worked with Dunlop to develop disc brakes for the front wheels of the 507, and his 507 eventually had disc brakes on all four wheels. Surtees owned his 507 until his death. Soon after, in July 2018, the Surtees car sold for £3,809,500 plus commission, the equivalent of US$5 million, the highest ever paid for a 507. On 1 December 2018, a 507 owned by BMW 507 and 503 designer Albrecht von Goertz was sold for £2,367,000 plus commission, also at Bonhams.
