= BMW Z8 =

Car model

BMW Z8 (E52)

Overview
- Manufacturer: BMW
- Model code: E52
- Production: 1999–2003; 5,703 produced
- Model years: 2000–2003
- Assembly: Germany: Munich
- Designer: Henrik Fisker; Scott Lempert (interior)

Body and chassis
- Class: Sports car (S)
- Body style: 2-door roadster
- Layout: Longitudinally mounted front mid-engine, rear-wheel-drive

Powertrain
- Engine: 4.9 L S62 V8; 4.8 L M62 V8 (Alpina version)
- Transmission: 6-speed manual 5-speed automatic (Alpina version)

Dimensions
- Wheelbase: 98.6 in (2,504 mm)
- Length: 173.2 in (4,399 mm)
- Width: 72 in (1,829 mm)
- Height: 51.9 in (1,318 mm)
- Curb weight: 3,494 lb (1,585 kg)

The BMW Z8 is a roadster produced by German automotive manufacturer BMW from 1998 to 2003. The Z8 was developed under the codename "E52" between 1993 and 1999, through the efforts of a design team led by Chris Bangle from 1993 to 1995. The exterior was designed by Henrik Fisker and the interior by Scott Lempert.

The Z8 originally was designed as a styling exercise intended to evoke and celebrate the 1956–1959 BMW 507. Prototypes were spotted testing between 1996 and 1999. A concept was later developed to preview the Z8, called the Z07 and was shown in October 1997 at the Tokyo Motor Show.

== Z07 Concept ==
The Z07 Concept had been based on the concurrently running E52 development programme. As a result, practical and regulatory considerations necessitated very few changes for the production model. Comparatively, the windshield of the series production Z8 was more upward, and the car had a larger front airdam. The Z8 hardtop differed from the Z07 in being a double-bubble form with a tapering fairing versus a single dome with a truncated convex rear. The Z07's exotic driver's side helmet fairing was never intended for production, in order to allow easy operation of the power soft top.

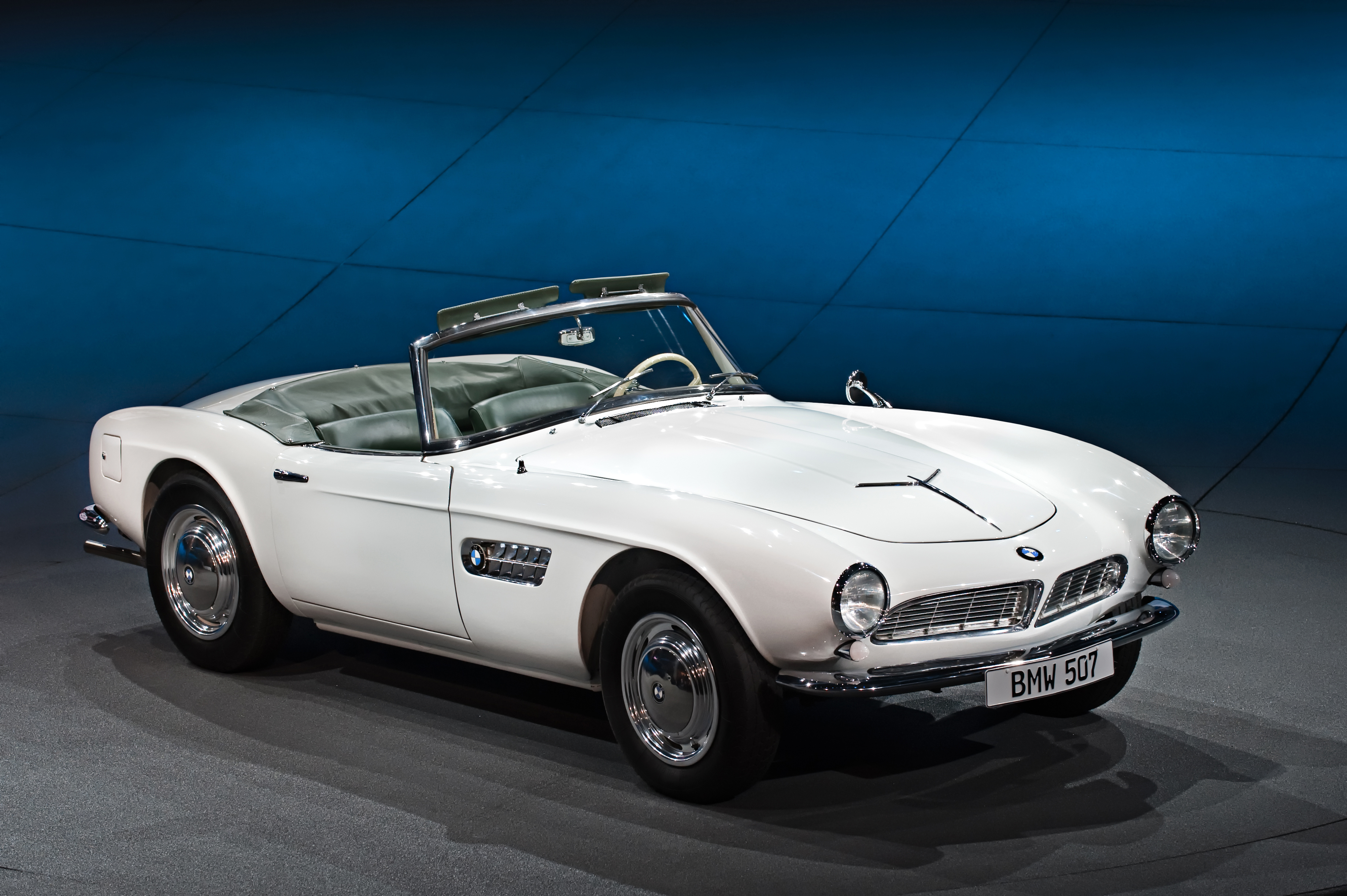
The Z07 was an homage to the iconic BMW 507

The side turn signal repeaters were integrated into the side vents in a fashion that rendered them invisible until activated. The vintage simplicity of the interior was preserved by hiding the modern equipment under retracting panels. Complex compound curves were made through the use of an expensive MIG-welded aluminium space frame.

== Specifications and features ==
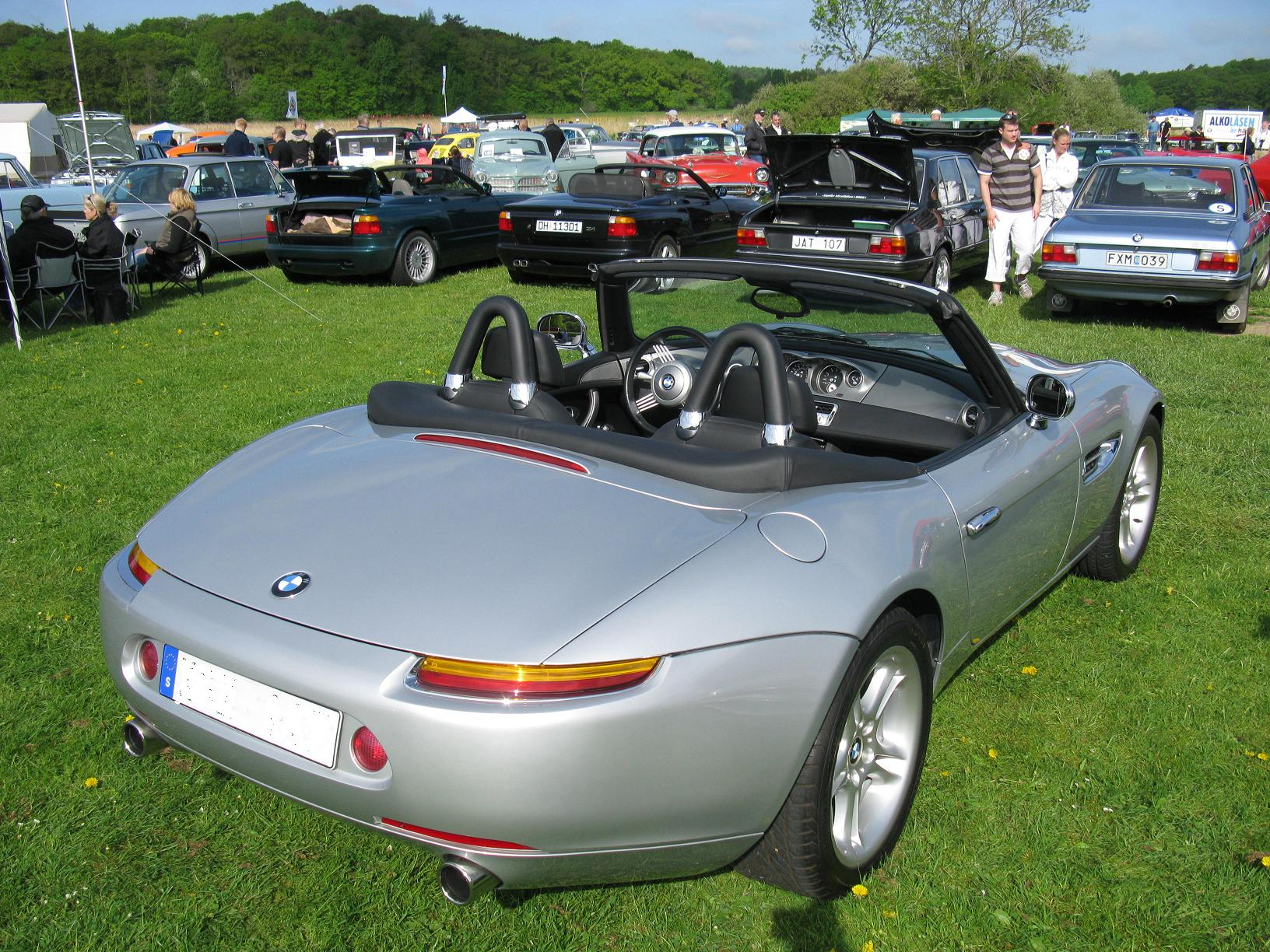
BMW Z8 (rear view)

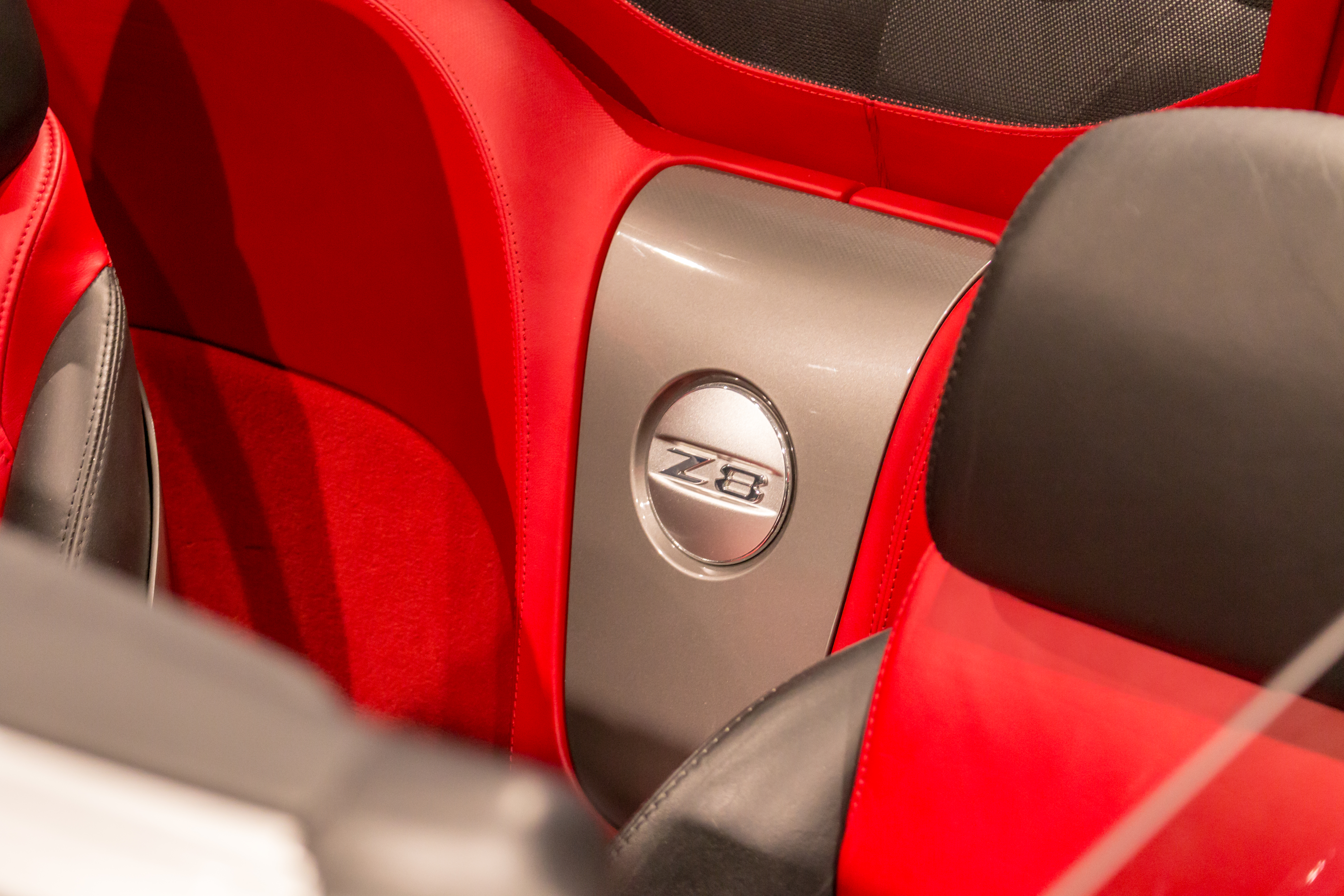
Unlike many BMW models, the only Z8 badging was on the interior of the car rather than at the rear

The Z8 cost US$128,000, had an all-aluminium chassis and body, and used a 4,941 cc (4.9 L; 301.5 cu in) V8 engine which has a power output of 400 PS (294 kW; 395 hp) at 6,600 rpm and 500 N⋅m (369 lbf⋅ft) of torque at 3,800 rpm. This engine, known internally as the S62, was built by BMW Motorsport and was shared with the E39 M5 sports saloon. The engine is located behind the front axle in order to provide the car with a 50/50 weight distribution. The factory claimed a 0–100 km/h (0–62 mph) acceleration time of 4.7 seconds; Motor Trend magazine achieved 0–96 km/h (0–60 mph) in 4.2 seconds. Road & Track measured the car's lateral grip at 0.92. Car and Driver magazine also tested the car and found that it outperformed the contemporary benchmark Ferrari 360 Modena in three important performance categories: acceleration, handling, and braking. As with most BMW automobiles the top speed of the Z8 was electronically limited to 250 km/h (155.4 mph) with the delimited top speed amounting to an estimated 290 km/h (180 mph).

The Z8 used neon exterior lighting, the tail lights and turn indicators are powered by neon tubes that offer quicker activation than standard lightbulbs and are expected to last for the life of the vehicle. Due to the quirk in the US FMVSS regulations, the turn signal indicators in the tail lights are entirely in red colour.

Every car was shipped with a colour-matching metal hardtop with a rear defroster. Unlike many contemporary hardtops, which are provided for practical rather than stylistic considerations, the hardtop of the Z8 was designed from the outset to complement the lines of the car's styling.

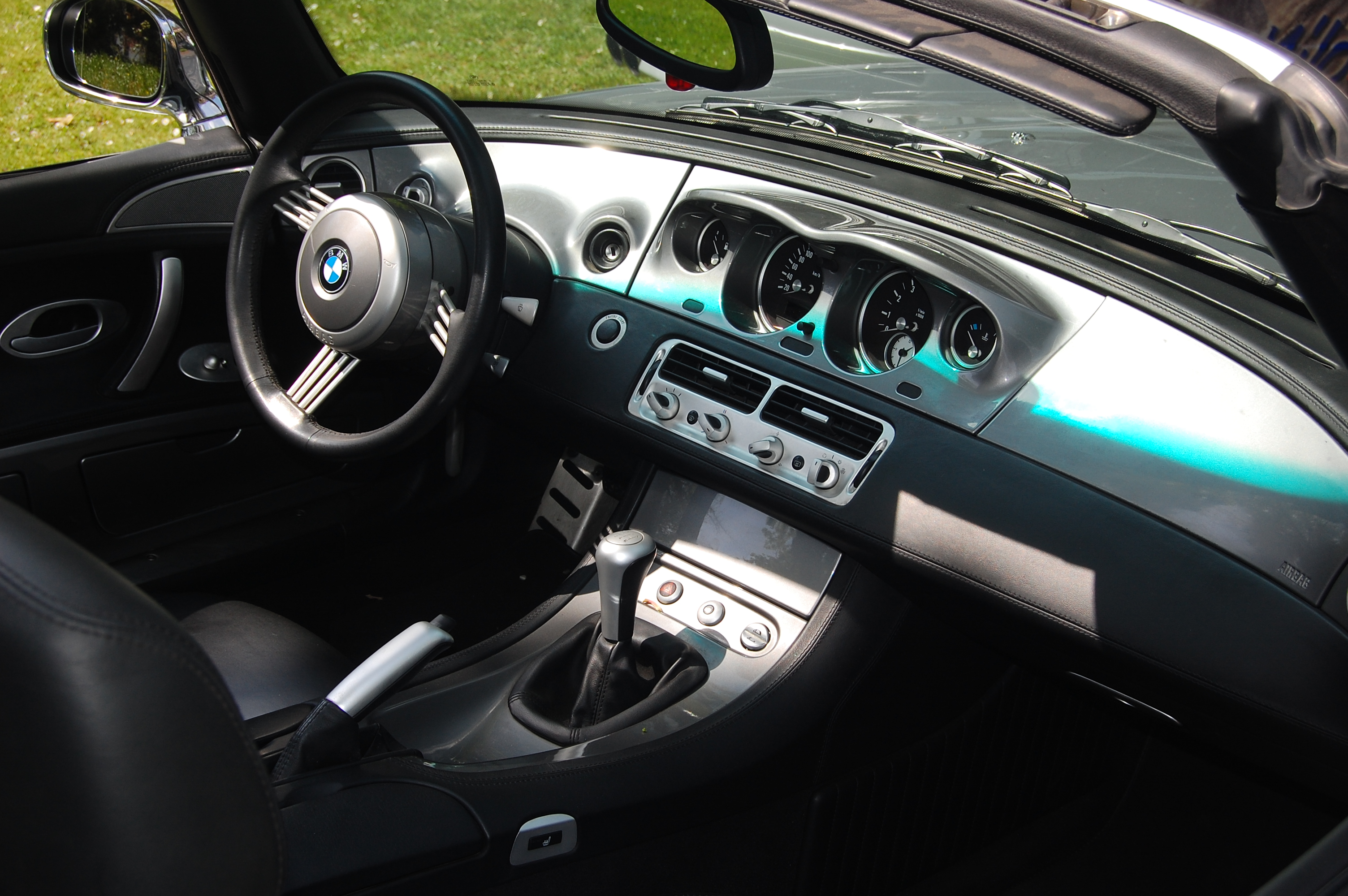
Interior

In order to keep the interior uncluttered, a number of functions were integrated into multifunction controls. For example, the power windows and mirrors were controlled by a single instrument. Also, the centre-mounted instrument cluster was canted slightly toward the driver. The displacement of gauges to the middle of the dashboard was intended to offer an unimpeded view of the hood and the road ahead.

In order to promote the Z8 to collectors and reinforce media speculation about the car's "instant classic" potential, BMW promised that a 50-year stockpile of spare parts would be maintained in order to support the Z8 fleet. Due to the limited volume of production, all elements of the car were constructed or finished by hand, thereby compounding the importance of ongoing manufacturer support for the type. The price and production process allowed BMW to offer customised options to interested buyers. A significant number of cars with bespoke paint and interior treatments were produced over the course of the four-year production run by BMW Individual, a division of BMW AG.

=== Z8 Safety Car ===
A safety car variant of the Z8 was produced for use in the 2001 season of MotoGP.

== Alpina Roadster V8 ==
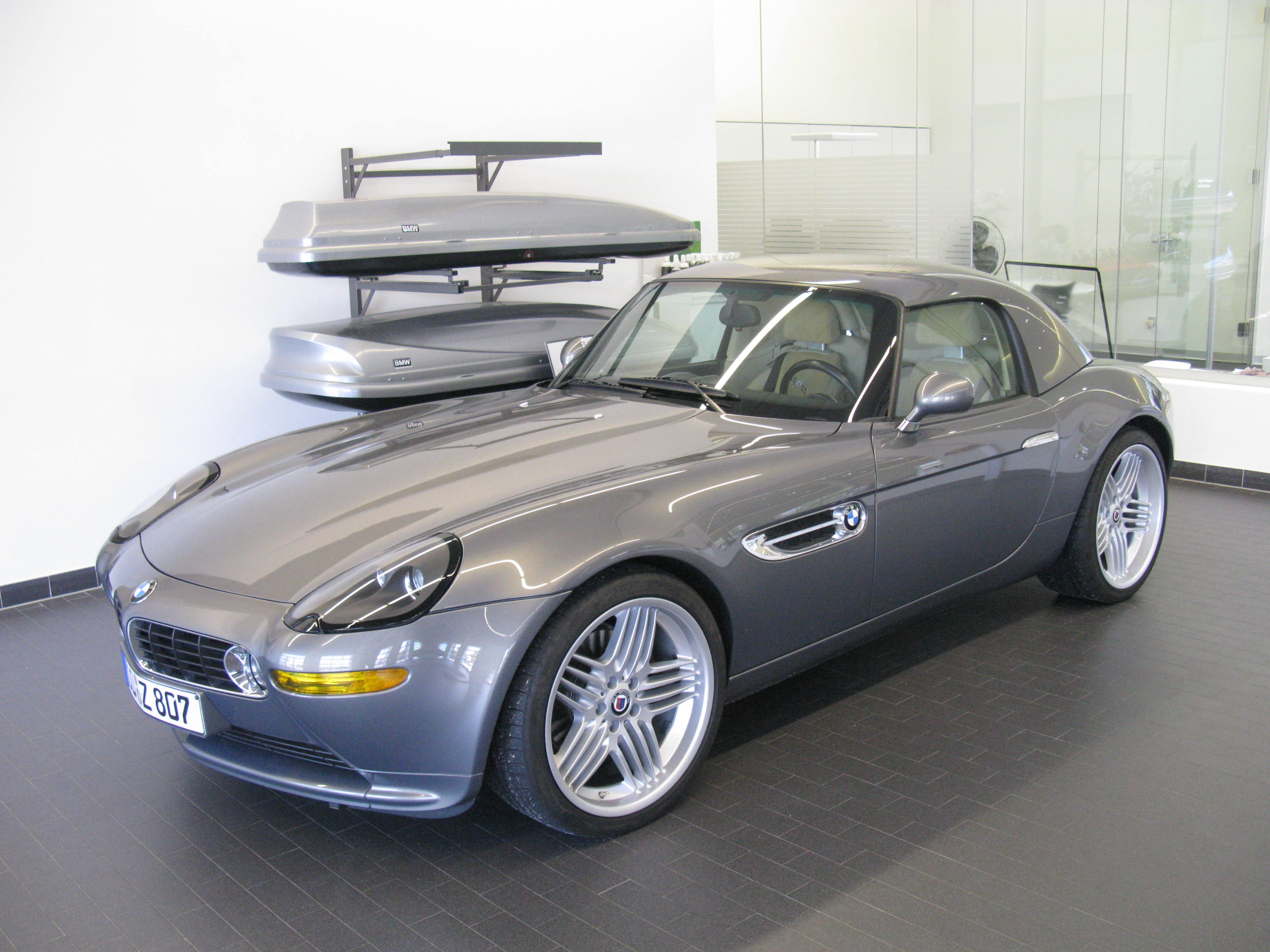
Alpina Roadster V8 with the hardtop in place

With production of the Z8 completed by November 2002, the Z8 was replaced by the Alpina Roadster V8 in 2003. The Alpina was a departure from the hard-edged sporting focus of the original car, and elements of grand touring intent were evident throughout this final iteration. Instead of the original 6-speed manual and 4.9 L (S62) engine featured in original Z8, the Alpina came only with an automatic transmission, utilising a 5-speed BMW Steptronic transmission mated to a 4.8 L Alpina-tuned BMW M62 V8 engine from the Alpina E39 B10 V8 S. In order to complete the car's transition from a sports car to a refined grand tourer, a softer suspension setting was used. The standard Z8's run-flat tyres on 18-inch (46 cm) wheels were discarded in favor of conventional tyres with softer sidewalls mounted on 20-inch (51 cm) Alpina wheels. A new softer grade of Nappa leather replaced the Z8's less supple specification, and special Alpina gauges were fitted on the dash board cluster. An Alpina steering wheel with three solid spokes replaced the original, which could not be retrofitted with shift paddles for the automatic transmission. Gear selection was displayed in an Alpina-specific display mounted in front of the steering wheel.

Performance and power output of the Alpina roadster V8 differed from that of the standard car in that the peak power was reduced to 280 kW (381 PS; 375 hp), while peak torque was raised to 520 N⋅m (384 lb⋅ft); this torque was available at significantly lower rpm than the original in order to enable more relaxed cruising. Curiously, the electronically limited top speed was officially raised to 260 km/h (160 mph).

Production of the Roadster V8 amounted to 555 units, 450 of which were exported to the U.S. market and only eight to the UK. In the United States, this special edition of the Z8 was sold directly through BMW dealerships, marking a first for Alpina, whose cars had never been sold through retail channels in the U.S.

== Bertone Birusa ==
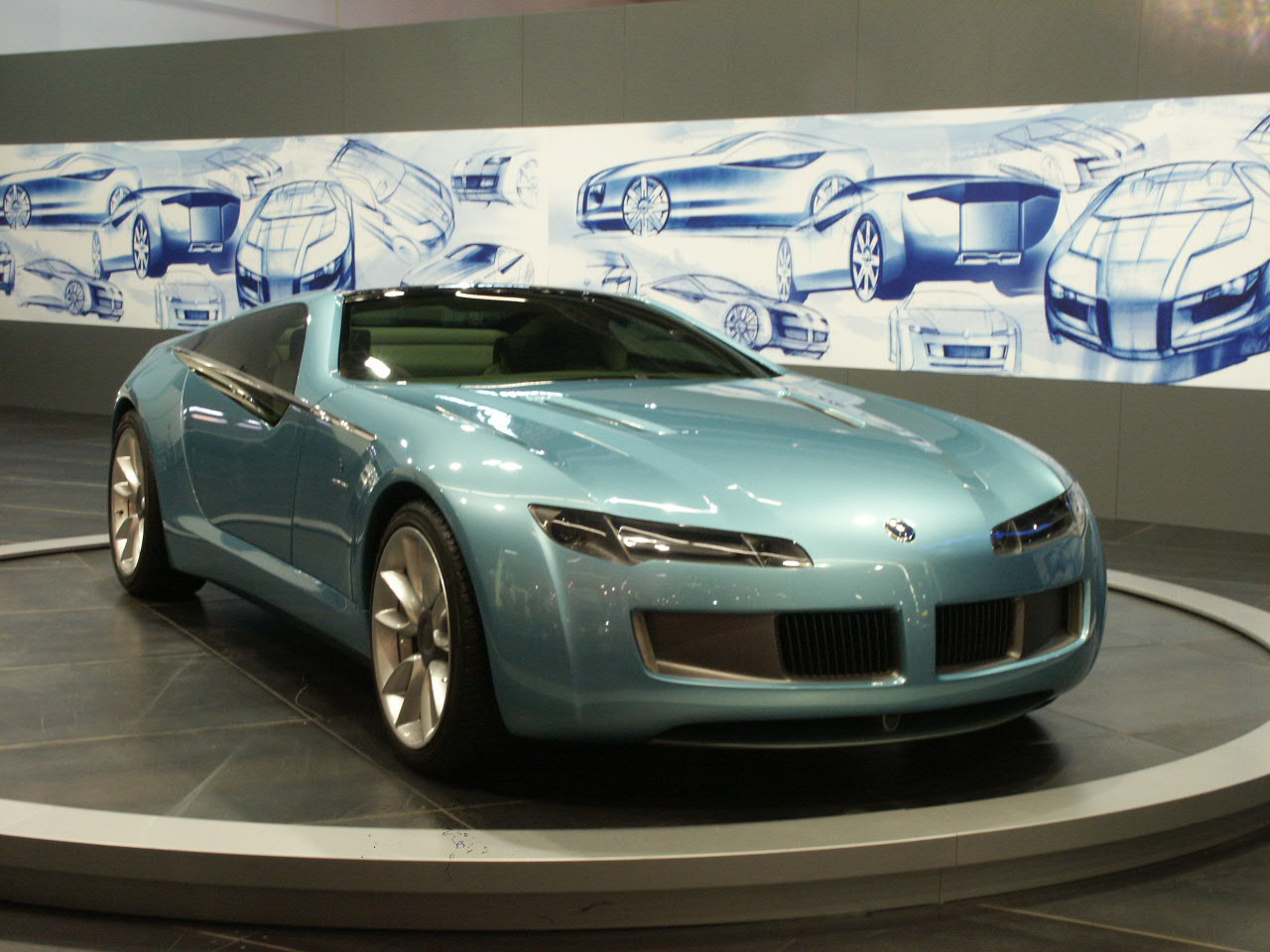
Bertone Birusa concept

Unveiled at the 2003 Geneva Motor Show, the Birusa is a concept car conceived and developed by Bertone. Based on the Z8, it shares the 4.9 L V8 engine from the donor car, generating 294 kW (400 PS; 395 hp), as well as the 6-speed manual transmission. It also has carbon fibre gull-wing doors and a variety of innovative technological features, including a sunroof that filters UV light, multilingual voice control and a night vision system.

== Production ==
The Z8's spaceframe was produced in the Dingolfing Plant and the car was hand-finished in Munich. A total of 5,703 Z8s were built: 3,160 for the world market and 2,543 for the North American market.

== In popular culture ==
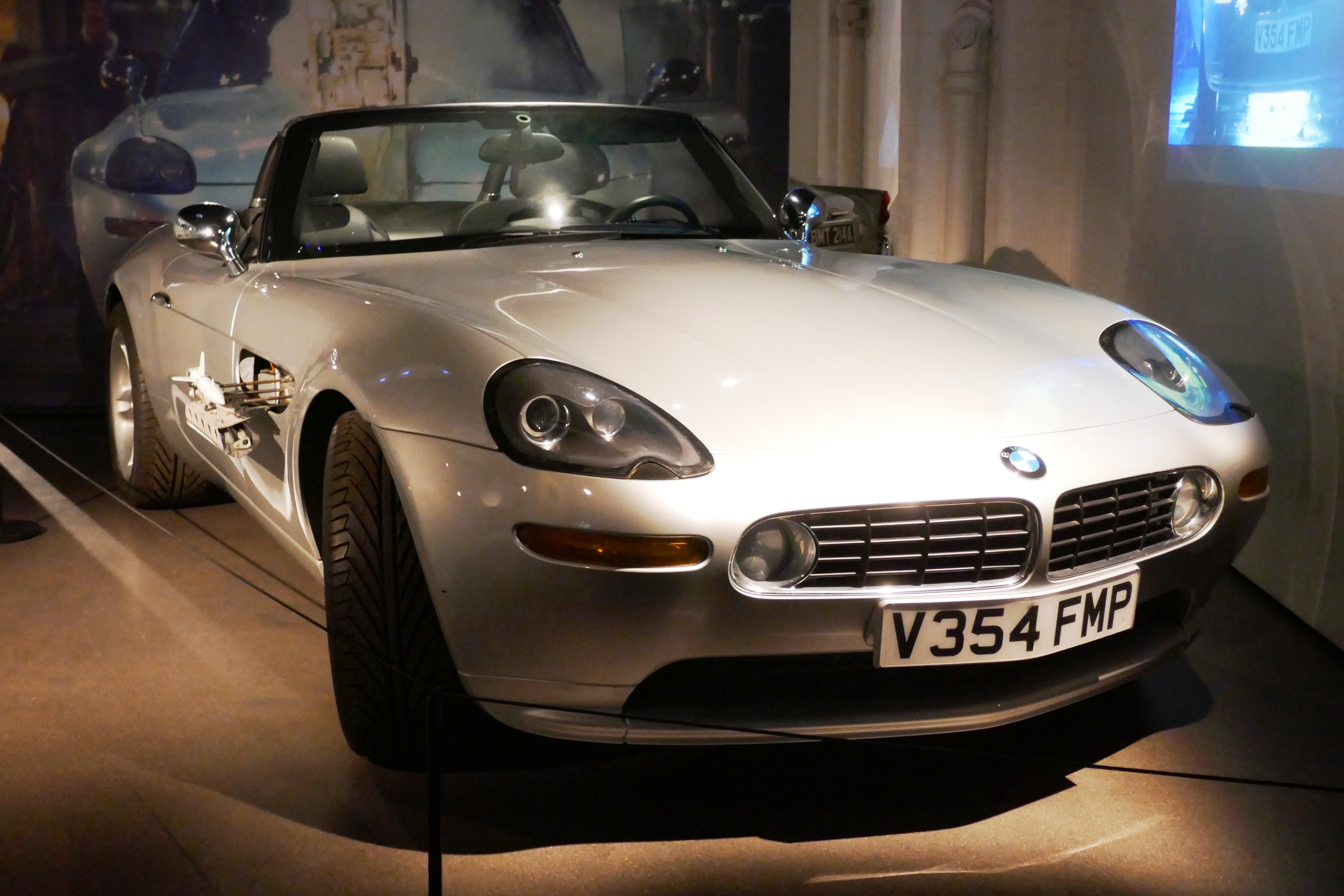
The BMW Z8 featured in the James Bond film The World Is Not Enough

The Z8 was showcased as James Bond's car in the film The World Is Not Enough released in November 1999, from scenes shot in early April 1999. In the film, it is driven by Bond for his mission in Azerbaijan until it is sliced in half by a helicopter equipped with cutting saws. The vehicle is equipped with surface to air missiles that is mostly activated through the car's steering wheel used as a targeting display, and can also be remote controlled through the use of the vehicle's keychain. This was the final BMW car to appear in the James Bond franchise as its 3-year film deal with BMW expired. It later reappeared in the James Bond video games 007 Racing and Agent Under Fire, the latter of which featured the car on the cover.

== U.S. sales ==
Calendar year	U.S. sales
2000	317
2001	970
2002	524
2003	439
2004	110
2005	17
2006	5
