= Max Hoffman =

American businessman (1904–1981)

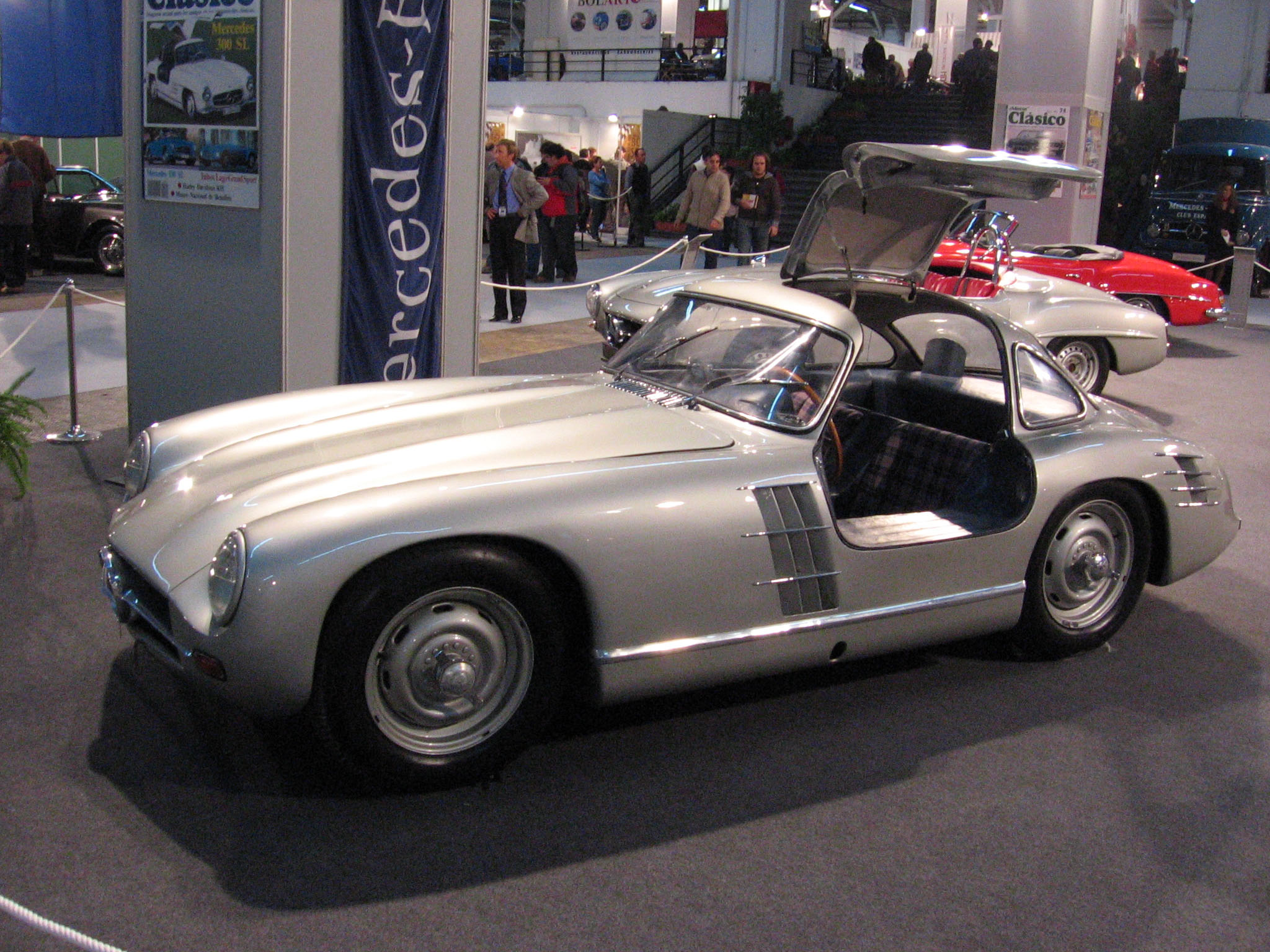
Prototype Mercedes-Benz 300SL, developed at Hoffman's request for the U.S. marketplace

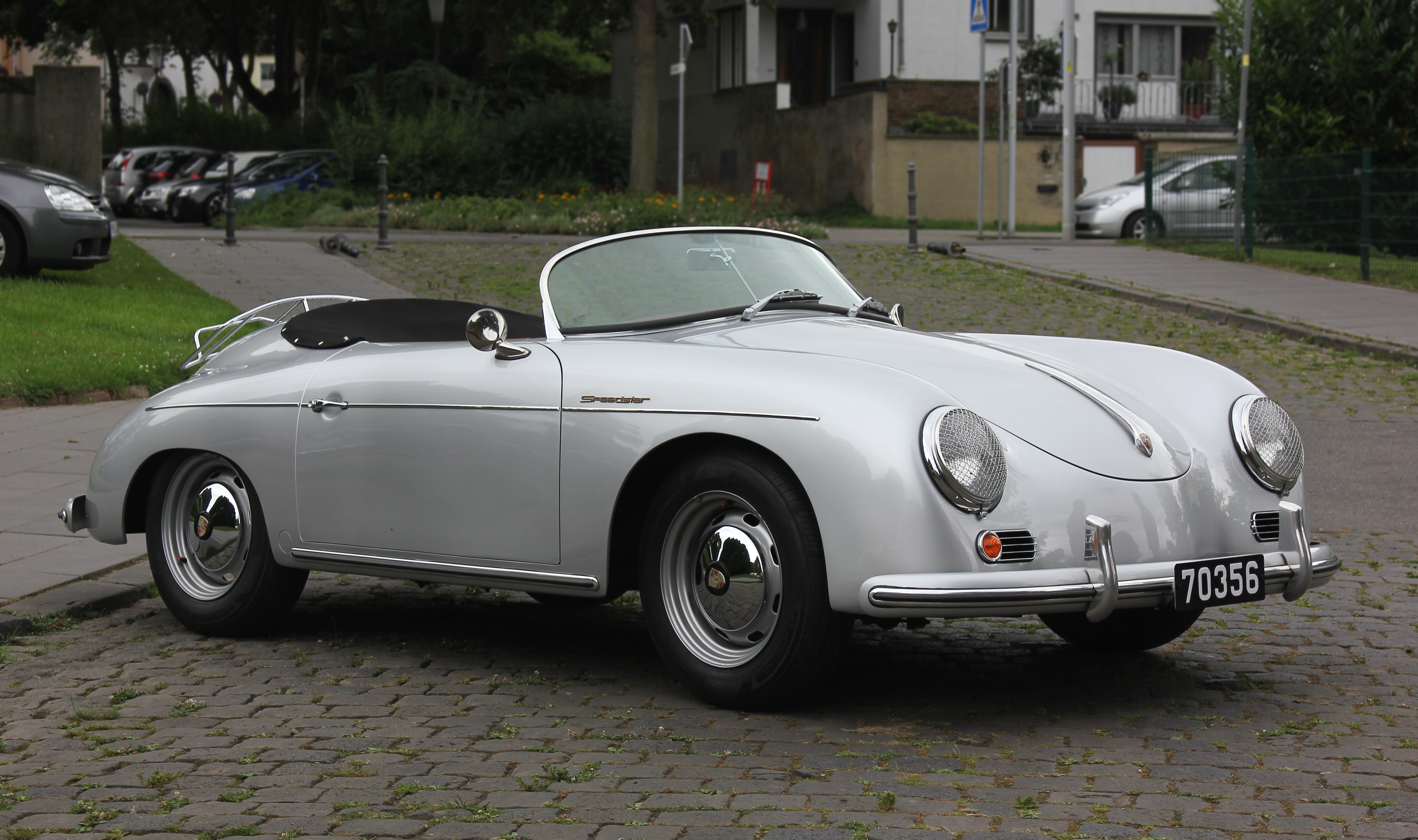
Porsche 356 Speedster, another model suggested by Hoffman

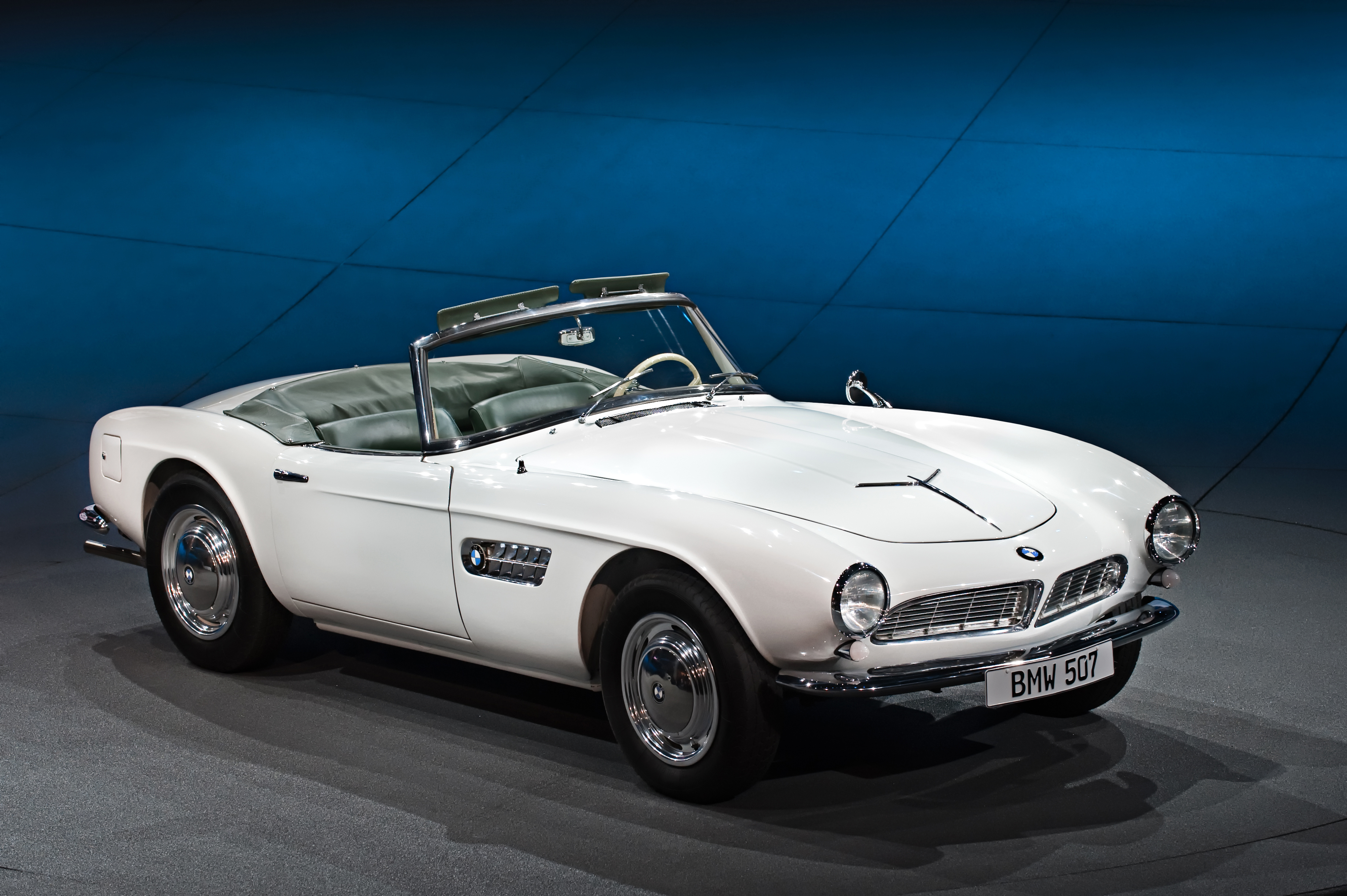
BMW 507, designed at the suggestion of Hoffman

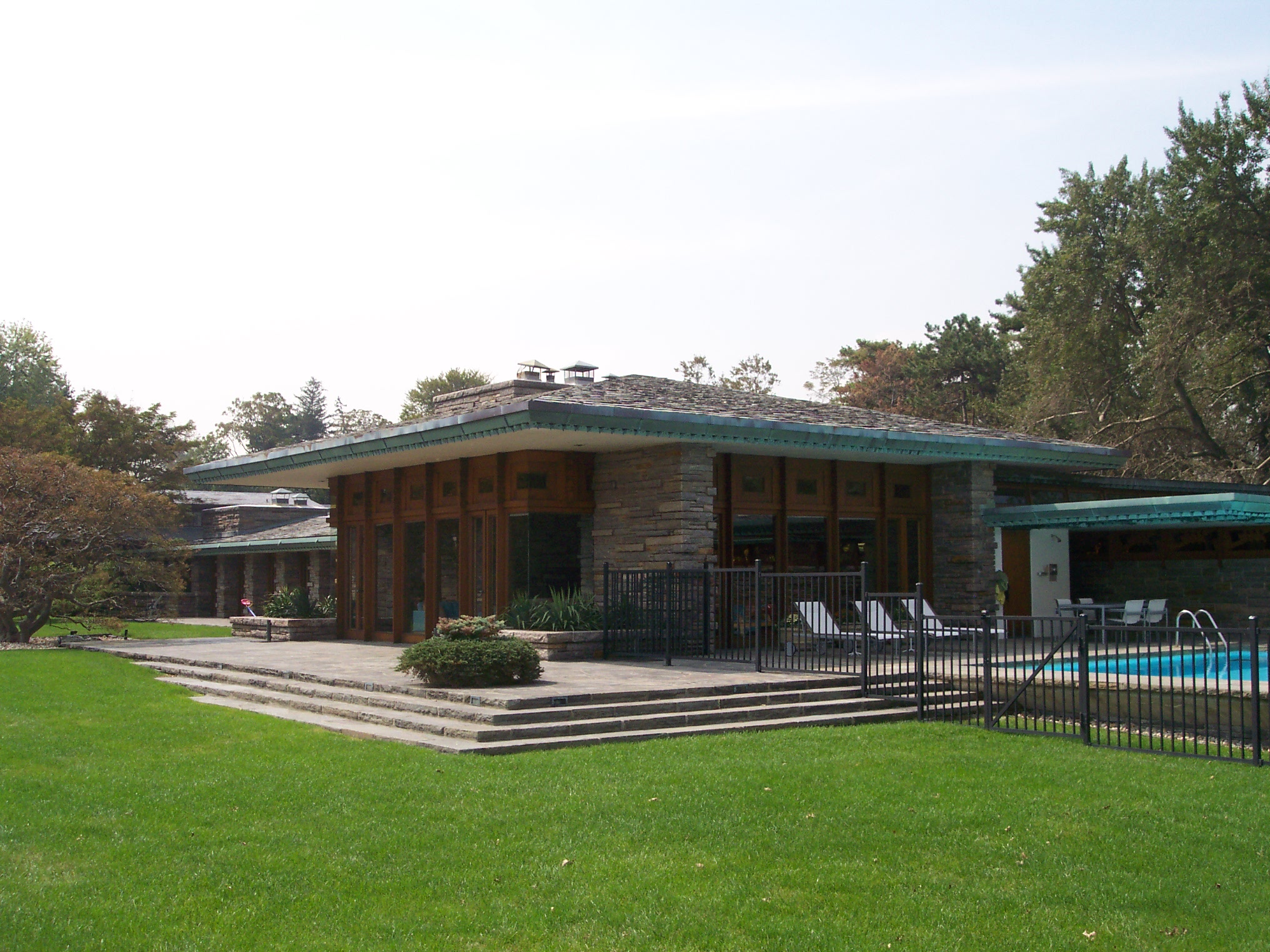
The Frank Lloyd Wright-designed Max Hoffman House, Rye, New York

Maximilian Edwin Hoffman (12 November 1904 – 9 August 1981), was an Austrian-born, New York-based importer of luxury European automobiles during the 1950s.

Hoffman played important roles in the development and commercialization of several period luxury and sports cars, including the Mercedes-Benz 300SL (W198) and 190 SL (W121), Porsche 356 Speedster, and BMW 507 roadster. It is also argued that he contributed to the premium public image European cars have in North America.

Hoffman's contributions to both automobile development and sports car racing earned him induction into the Automotive Hall of Fame in 2003. Both his home in Rye, New York, and Park Avenue Jaguar showroom in Manhattan were designed by famed architect Frank Lloyd Wright.

== Early life ==
Hoffman was born on 12 November 1904 in Vienna, Austria, to Jewish parents. His father owned a bicycle manufacturing business, where Hoffman worked when growing up. He developed enough skills to get a job as a factory driver for an Austrian company that produced the French Amilcar, and later became a dealer for the brand.

== Career ==
Prior to immigrating to New York City in 1941, Hoffman had been the middle European sales representative of several prestigious European marques as Rolls-Royce, Bentley, Alfa Romeo, and Volvo. During World War II, when the private market for cars was very slow in the United States, Hoffman used his intuition for possibilities and market niches to start creating jewelry for women, using metallized plastic. He started this business with just 300 dollars, and even in wartime, he earned a small fortune from it. Once the war was over, Hoffman returned to following his true passion for fast and luxurious automobiles.

Hoffman opened Hoffman Motors in 1947. His first client was Jaguar, for which he was the exclusive importer from 1948 until 1952. From 1950 until 1953, Hoffmann was the importer and distributor for Volkswagen for the eastern United States. In 1952 he became the importer and sole distributor for Mercedes-Benz.

Hoffman's various dealers made requests through him, both for existing models and new types they thought their customers would purchase in the booming post-war American market. The most famous result of Hoffman's requests is the Mercedes-Benz 300SL "Gullwing". It took a commitment to personally purchase 1,000 of the luxury coupes to get Mercedes to be willing to take on the substantial cost, and risk, of production. Hoffman had judged the market correctly, as more than 80% of the approximately 1400 300 SLs built were sold in the US, making it the first Mercedes-Benz widely successful outside its home market and thoroughly validating Hoffman's seat-of-the-pants prediction. Its success is credited with changing the company's image in America from a manufacturer of solid but staid luxury automobiles to one once again capable of rendering high-performance sports cars.

Hoffman played an instrumental role in popularizing Porsche vehicles in the United States, selling one-third of the manufacturer's entire output there in the mid-1950s. Notably, Hoffman's vision for a cheaper, racier version of the Porsche 356 led to the creation of the iconic Porsche 356 Speedster. He also set a significant milestone by establishing the Porsche emblem, which was designed by Ferry Porsche at Hoffman's urging. Furthermore, Hoffman facilitated Porsche's success in the US by arranging for several Porsche 356 cars to race in various events, resulting in significant victories and increased popularity for the brand in the country.

Hoffman also became the U.S. importer for Alfa Romeo in the mid-1950s, becoming the impetus for the development of the highly successful Giulietta Spider.

Hoffman was also the importer and sole distributor for BMW starting in the mid-sixties, credited with spurring the manufacturer to develop the extremely popular BMW 2002 series. and establishing it as premier sport/luxury brand there. As he had with Alfa Romeo by 1961, Hoffman sufficiently built up BMW imports to where the manufacturer was able to take on the job directly, selling his business to BMW of North America in 1975.

Some of Hoffman's dealers, such as Lake Underwood, a three-time Sports Car Club of America national champion in a Porsche 356 and his team's machine engineer, Dick DeBiasse, became instrumental in development, testing, and racing automobiles that would appeal to the American market or influence their choices of brands for purchase.

== Personal ==
The Max Hoffman House in Rye, New York, and its interior, were designed by Frank Lloyd Wright in 1955, one year after Hoffman had commissioned Wright to design and build his Jaguar Hoffman Auto Showroom at 430 Park Avenue in Manhattan.

In 1982 Hoffman's widow, Marion, established the non-profit Maximilian E. and Marion O. Hoffman Foundation Inc., in West Hartford, Connecticut. The charity, which donates to groups, mostly in Connecticut, that further education, medicine and the arts, had assets of approximately $60 million in 2013.

Hoffman, who had a Jewish father, was an auto racer in Europe before immigrating to the United States, by way of Paris, to avoid the Nazis.

== See also ==
- Lake Underwood
- Ferrari America
- BMW 507
