= Hoffman Auto Showroom =

Dealership in Manhattan, New York

Coordinates: 40.7609°N 73.9716°W

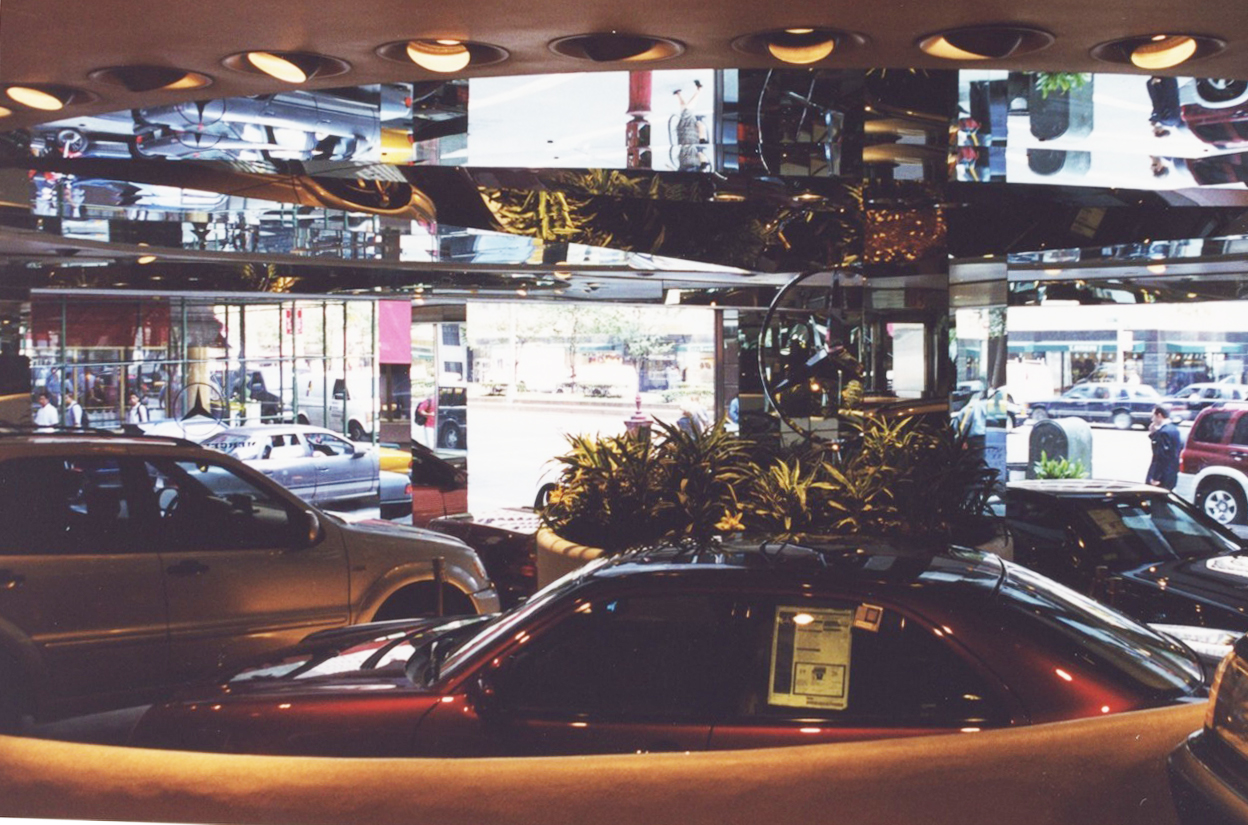
Interior of the Hoffman Auto Showroom, 1999, illustrating the spiral platform for vehicle display. The mirrored surfaces were not part of the original design, and were added in the early 1980s.

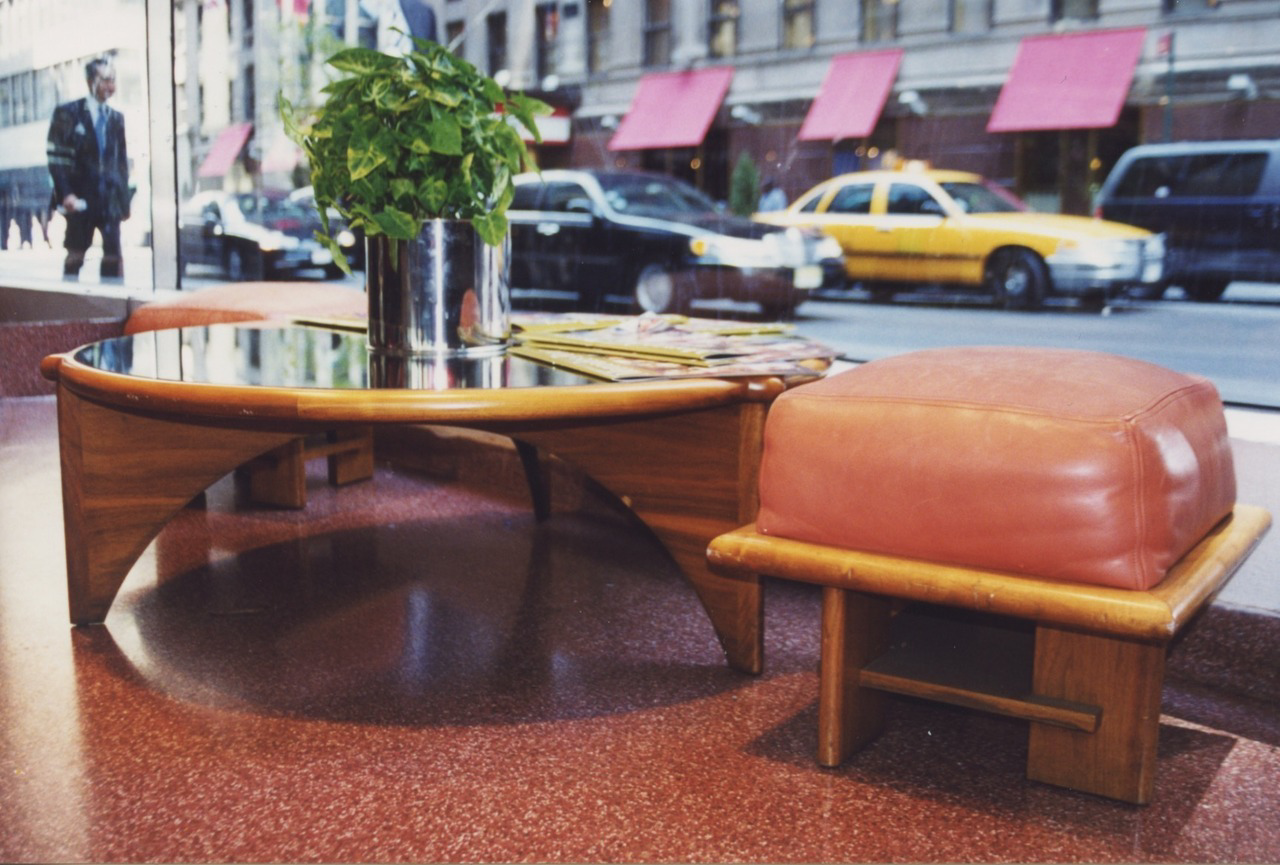
Interior of the Hoffman Auto Showroom, 1999. This Wright-designed table and low stool sat against the window looking out onto Fifth Avenue.

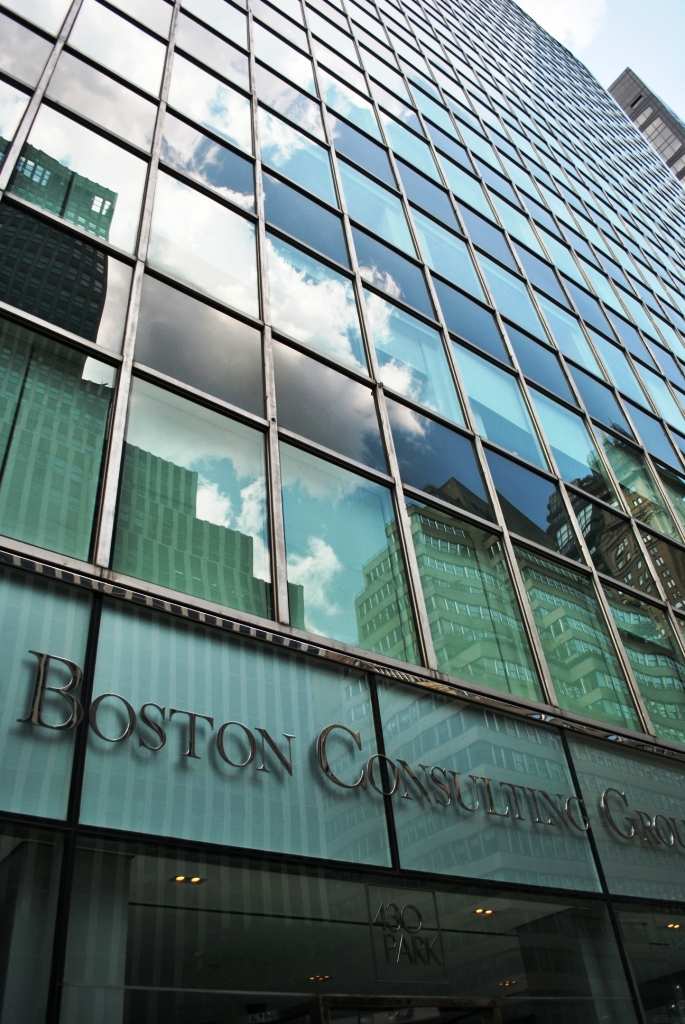
Exterior of the building in which the showroom was located.

The Hoffman Auto Showroom was an automobile dealership at 430 Park Avenue in Midtown Manhattan, New York City. Designed by architect Frank Lloyd Wright for notable European importer Max Hoffman in 1954, the glass and steel 3,600-square-foot (330 m^{2}) space was located on the ground floor of an office tower located between East 55th and 56th streets. It was dominated by a sloping floor capable of displaying up to five automobiles.

Hoffman, the son of a Viennese Rolls-Royce dealer, had intended to use it for his Jaguar dealership. However, by its completion he had moved on to Mercedes-Benz and a large model of a leaping jaguar had to be sent back to Coventry.

In early April 2013, the building's owners, Midwood Investment & Management and Oestreicher Properties, demolished the showroom to make way for a TD Bank branch office.

== See also ==
- List of Frank Lloyd Wright works
