= Air transports of heads of state and government =

Air transports for heads of state and government are, in many countries, provided by the air force in specially equipped airliners, business jets, or helicopters. One such aircraft in particular has become part of popular culture: Air Force One, used by the president of the United States and operated by the United States Air Force. Other well-known official aircraft include the Russian presidential aircraft, the British Royal Air Force VIP aircraft, the French Cotam 001, the Royal Canadian Air Force VIP aircraft, the German Konrad Adenauer, the Royal Australian Air Force VIP fleet, the Japanese Air Force One, the South Korean Code One, the Indian India One, the Brazilian Air Force One.

== History ==
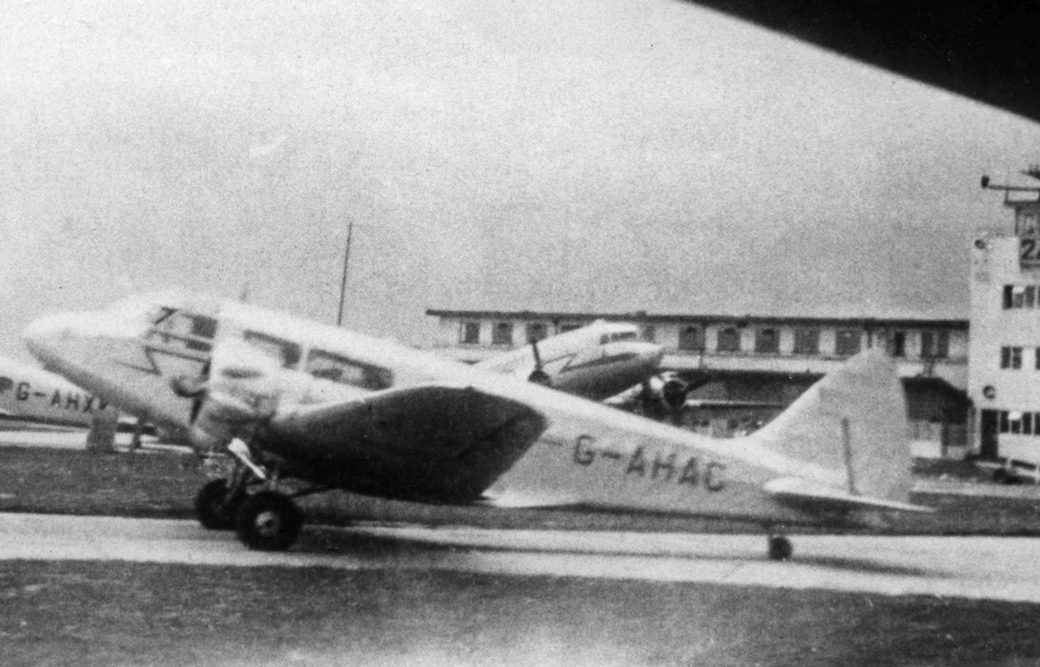
The Airspeed Envoy was used as air transport for the British Royal Family from 1937 onwards.

On 15 July 1910, the then Tsar of Bulgaria Ferdinand I became the first head of state to fly in an aircraft during a visit to Belgium.

In 1919, during Paris Peace Conference, senior British politicians including Prime Minister David Lloyd George and Leader of the House of Commons Bonar Law used several Airco DH.4 planes for the cross-Channel trips. Originally designed as bombers, modified planes featured an enclosed compartment for two passengers (cockpit was left open) and a separate luggage compartment. Dubbed Lloyd George's airplane, it was probably one of the first aircraft to be widely used by a political leader.

The British monarch became the first head of state or government to receive official and dedicated air transport when two Westland Wapitis were delivered to No. 24 Squadron RAF at RAF Northolt for the express purpose of the transportation of the Royal family in 1928. Between 1929 and 1935, Edward, Prince of Wales, purchased 13 aircraft. Although the RAF maintained at least one of these aircraft for a time, the Prince of Wales eventually became solely responsible for them. When the prince ascended to the throne in 1936 as Edward VIII, The King's Flight was formed as the world's first head of state aircraft unit.

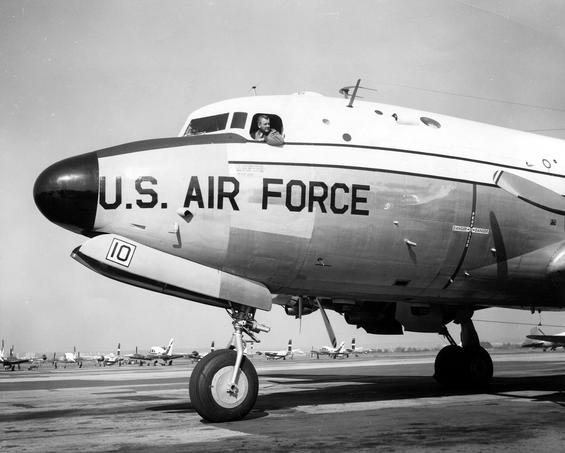
President Franklin D. Roosevelt's Douglas C-54 Skymaster aircraft, nicknamed the Sacred Cow.

In the United States, prior to World War II overseas and cross-country presidential travel was rare. Franklin D. Roosevelt was the first president to fly in an aircraft while in office. During World War II, Roosevelt traveled on the Dixie Clipper, a Pan Am-crewed Boeing 314 flying boat, to the 1943 Casablanca Conference in Morocco. The flight covered 5,500 miles in three legs. The first dedicated aircraft proposed for presidential use was a Consolidated C-87 Liberator Express VIP transport aircraft. This aircraft, tail number 41-24159, was re-modified in 1943 for use as a presidential VIP transport, the Guess Where II, intended to carry President Franklin D. Roosevelt on international trips. The Secret Service subsequently reconfigured a Douglas C-54 Skymaster for duty as a presidential transport. This VC-54C aircraft, nicknamed the Sacred Cow, included a sleeping area, radio telephone, and retractable elevator to lift Roosevelt in his wheelchair. As modified, the VC-54C was used by President Roosevelt only once, on his trip to and from the Yalta Conference in February 1945.

== Countries ==
=== Albania ===
An Airbus A319 aircraft, acquired from the Italian Air Force in 2005, was leased to the Albanian state in early 2020 for about four and a half years, and then gifted.

=== Argentina ===
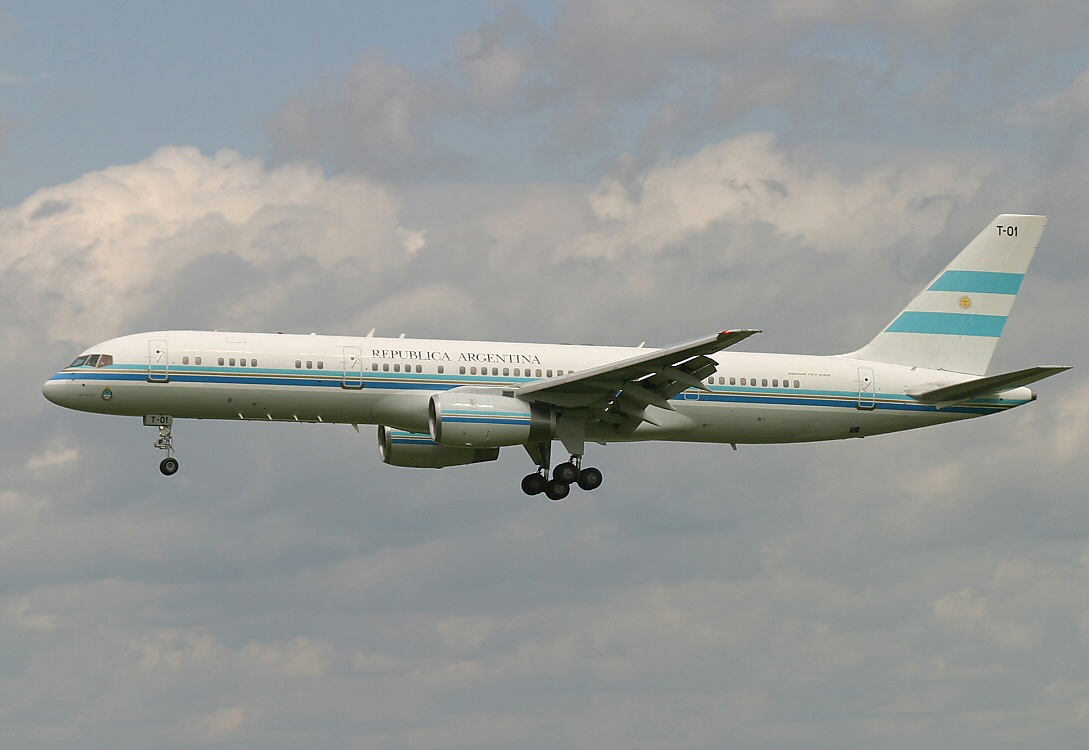
Tango 01 of Argentine Republic

The Argentinian government currently uses a Boeing 757 outfitted in a VIP configuration for use as presidential transport, which was delivered in May 2023.

Aircraft have included a Boeing 737-500

The Agrupación Aérea Presidencial was closed in 2016 by then-president Mauricio Macri due to the high cost of repairs and maintenance, the lack of adequate pilots and spare parts and a lack of economic viability.

=== Armenia ===
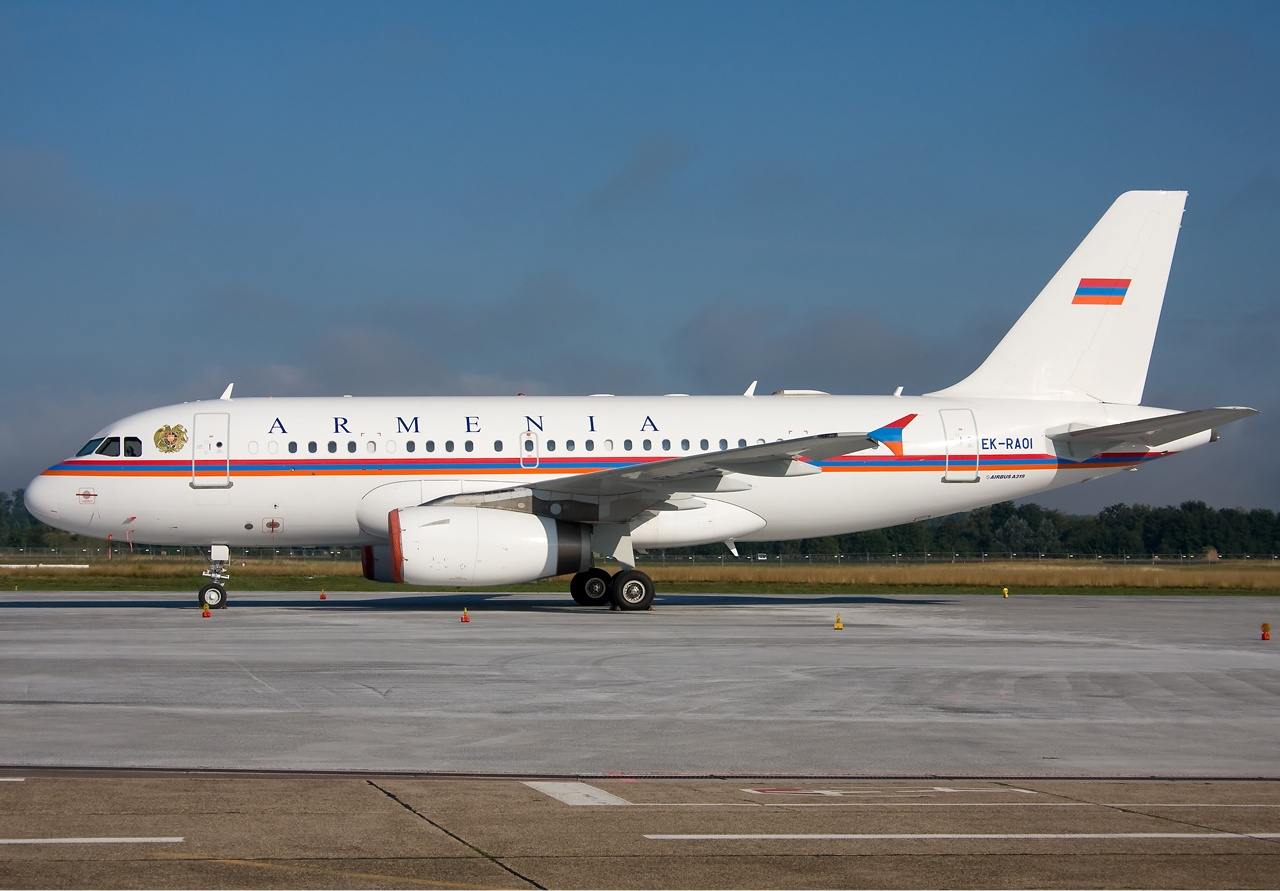
Armenian Air Force Airbus A319

The Armenian Government operates an Airbus A319CJ for VIP use.

=== Australia ===
The Royal Australian Air Force operates a number of specialised aircraft to carry the Monarch of Australia, members of the Royal Family, the Governor-General of Australia, the Prime Minister of Australia, other cabinet ministers, and other senior members of the Australian government, as well as foreign (mostly Pacific Island) dignitaries.

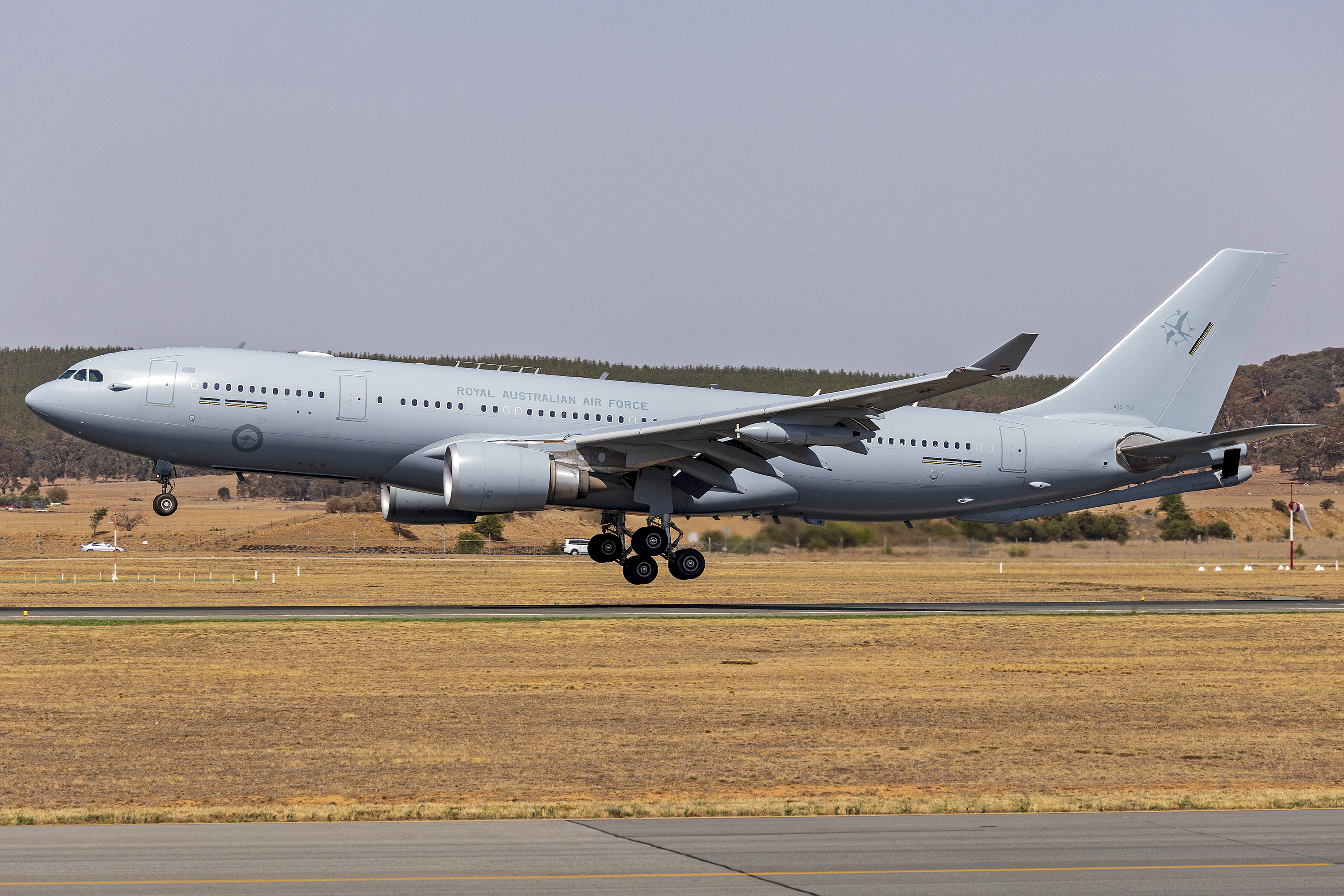
RAAF KC-30A at Canberra, 2020.

An Airbus A330 MRTT multi-role tanker was announced by Defence Minister David Johnston in 2014 to be acquired for VIP transport, while maintaining its original ability to serve as a military tanker and transport aircraft. The aircraft is painted in an "air force grey" livery and has 100 lie-flat seats for its passengers.

The RAAF's other VIP aircraft are two leased Boeing Business Jets and three Dassault Falcon 7Xs which are operated by the No. 34 Squadron RAAF and are based at Canberra Airport. The Falcon 7Xs replaced three Bombardier Challenger 604s in 2019. The Boeing Business Jets are custom configured Boeing 737-700s, fitted with facilities such as conference tables, offices suites, secure satellite and communication capabilities. These two aircraft have a longer range than what is standard for Boeing Business Jets. The Prime Minister regularly makes use of the aircraft for domestic and international travel.

An RAAF BBJ MAX 8 approaching Canberra Airport in 2026.

The BBJs and Challenger 604s replaced five No. 34 Squadron Dassault Falcon 900s and passenger-configured Boeing 707s tanker transports of No. 33 Squadron RAAF in 2002. These in turn replaced two BAC One-Elevens, three Dassault Falcon 20s and two Hawker Siddeley HS 748s.

Beginning in 2024, the RAAF have introduced new Boeing 737 MAX 8 BBJs into the fleet to replace the leased Boeing 737-700.

=== Azerbaijan ===
The President of Azerbaijan currently has several aircraft dedicated for travel. These include an Airbus A319 nicknamed "Baku", an Airbus A320 Prestige, a Boeing 767-300ER nicknamed "Baku-1", a leased Airbus A340-600 nicknamed "Baku-8".

=== Bangladesh ===
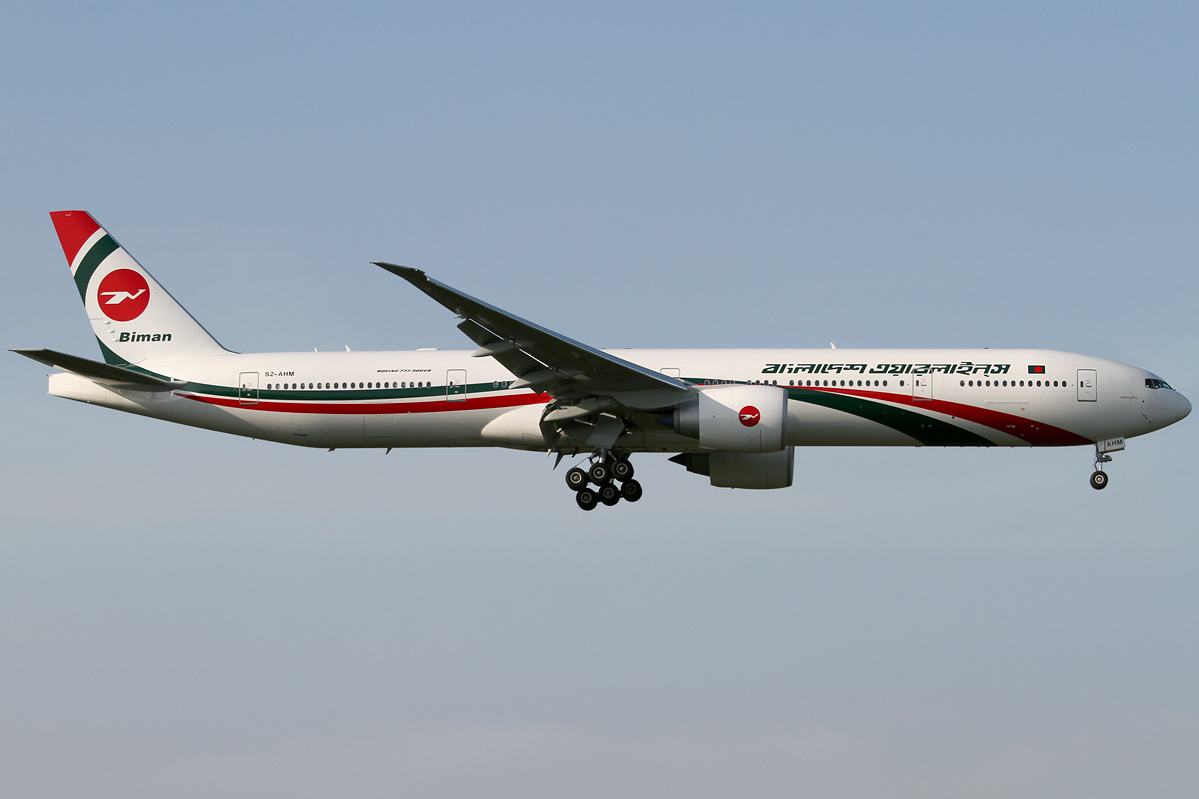
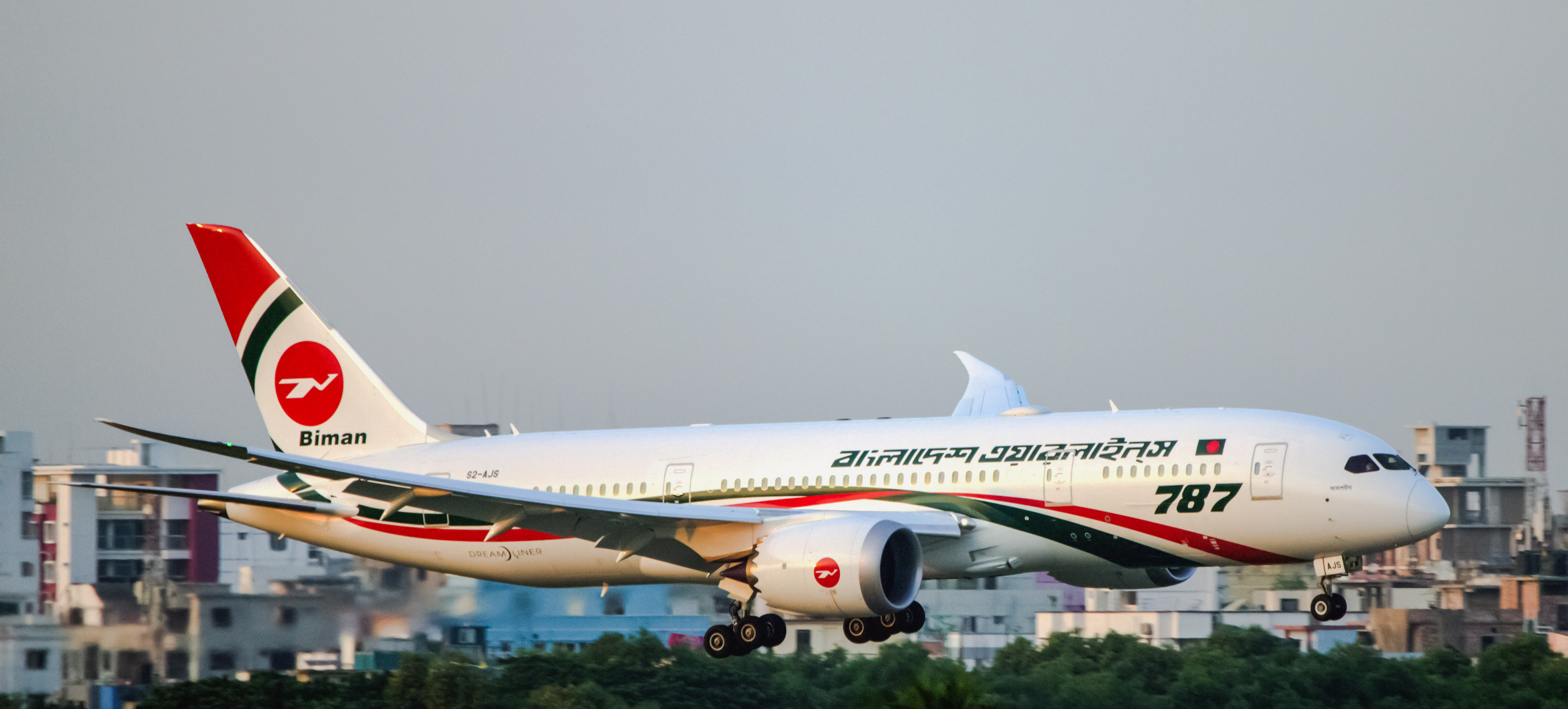
A Biman Boeing 777-300ER (left) and Boeing 787-8 (right), which are mostly used by PM for VIP trips

For long-distance flights or flights with an especially large entourage, a Boeing 777-300ER aircraft is usually used; for medium to short-distance flights a Boeing 787 Dreamliner is typically used.

=== Belarus ===
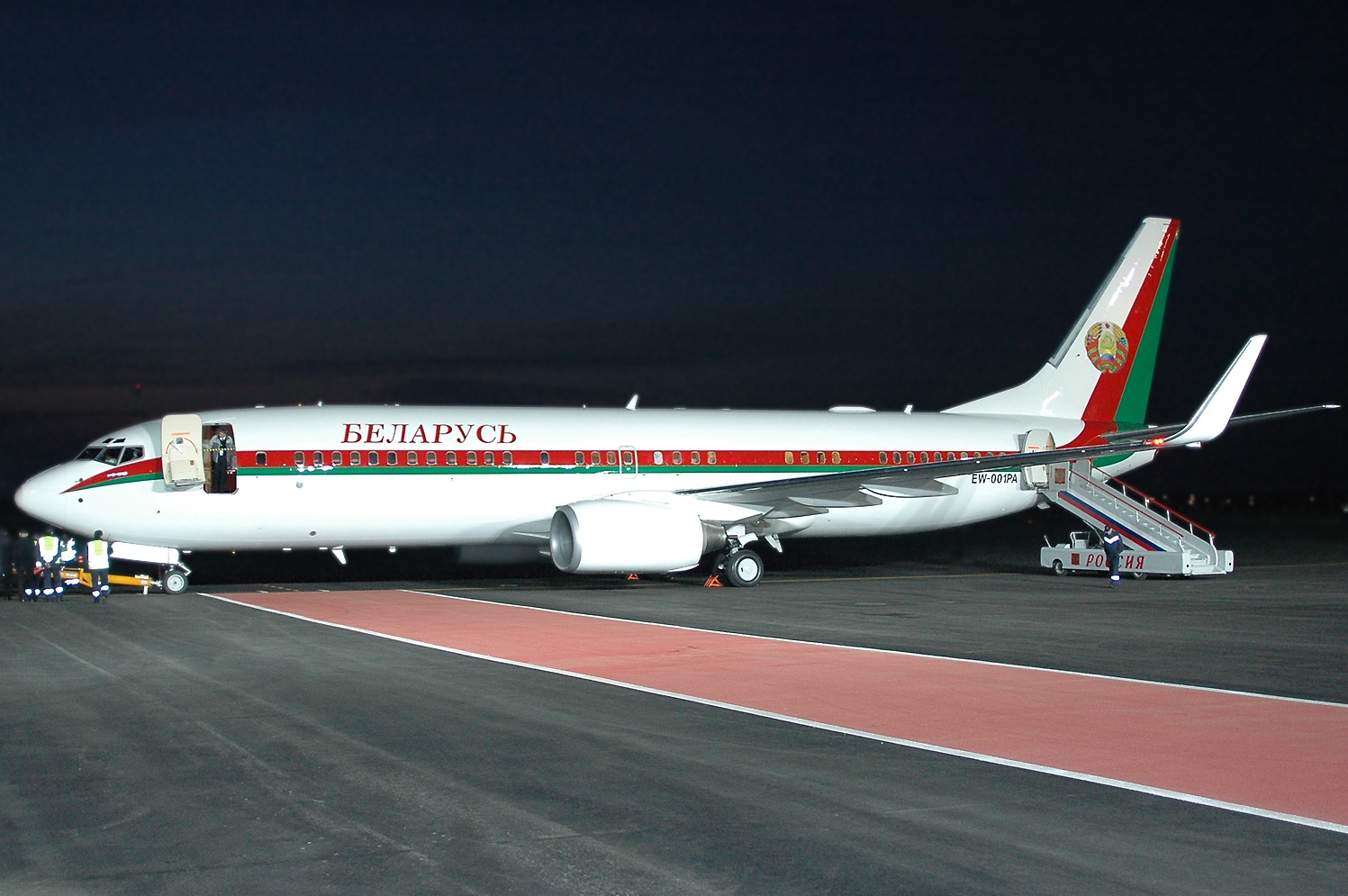
Boeing 737-800BBJ operated by Belavia on behalf of the Government of Belarus in 2005

Belarusian flag carrier Belavia operates a Gulfstream Aerospace G550 on behalf of the government for use of the President and Prime Minister. Belarus also operates a 767-300ER for long range governmental travel

=== Belgium ===
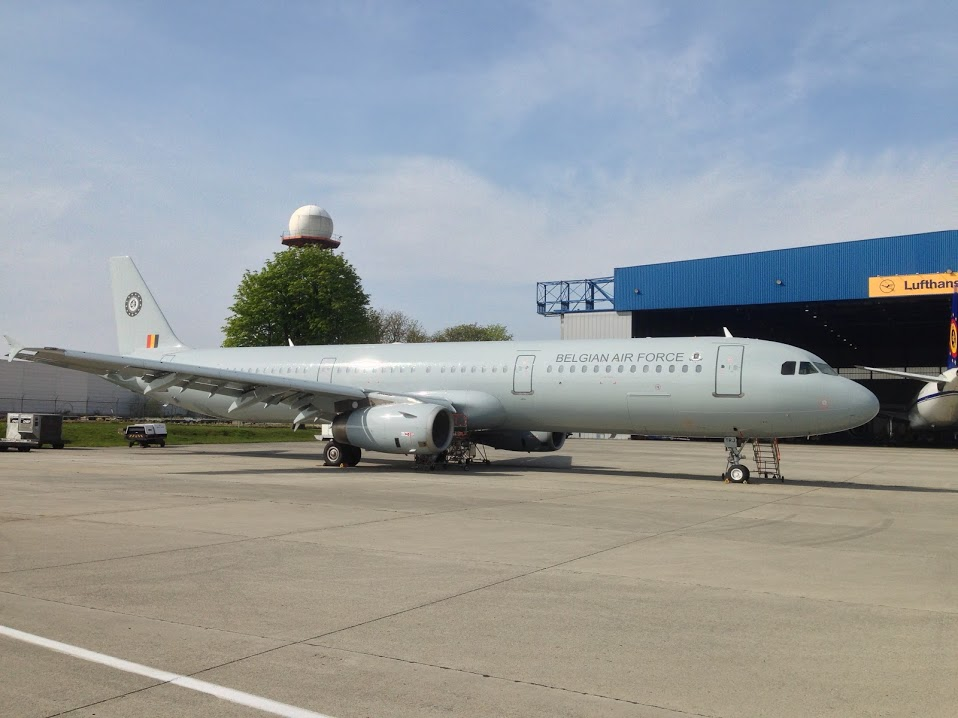
Belgian Air Force Airbus A321-231, returned to lessor Hi Fly in 2020

For the transport of the Belgian royal family and the members of the Government, Belgium uses two dry-leased Dassault Falcon 7X operated by the 15th Air Transport Wing of the Belgian Armed Forces.

=== Bosnia and Herzegovina ===
Bosnia and Herzegovina's Council of Ministers operate a Cessna Citation I, a Cessna CitationJet and a Cessna Citation CJ4. These are mainly used for domestic and European flights.

=== Brazil ===
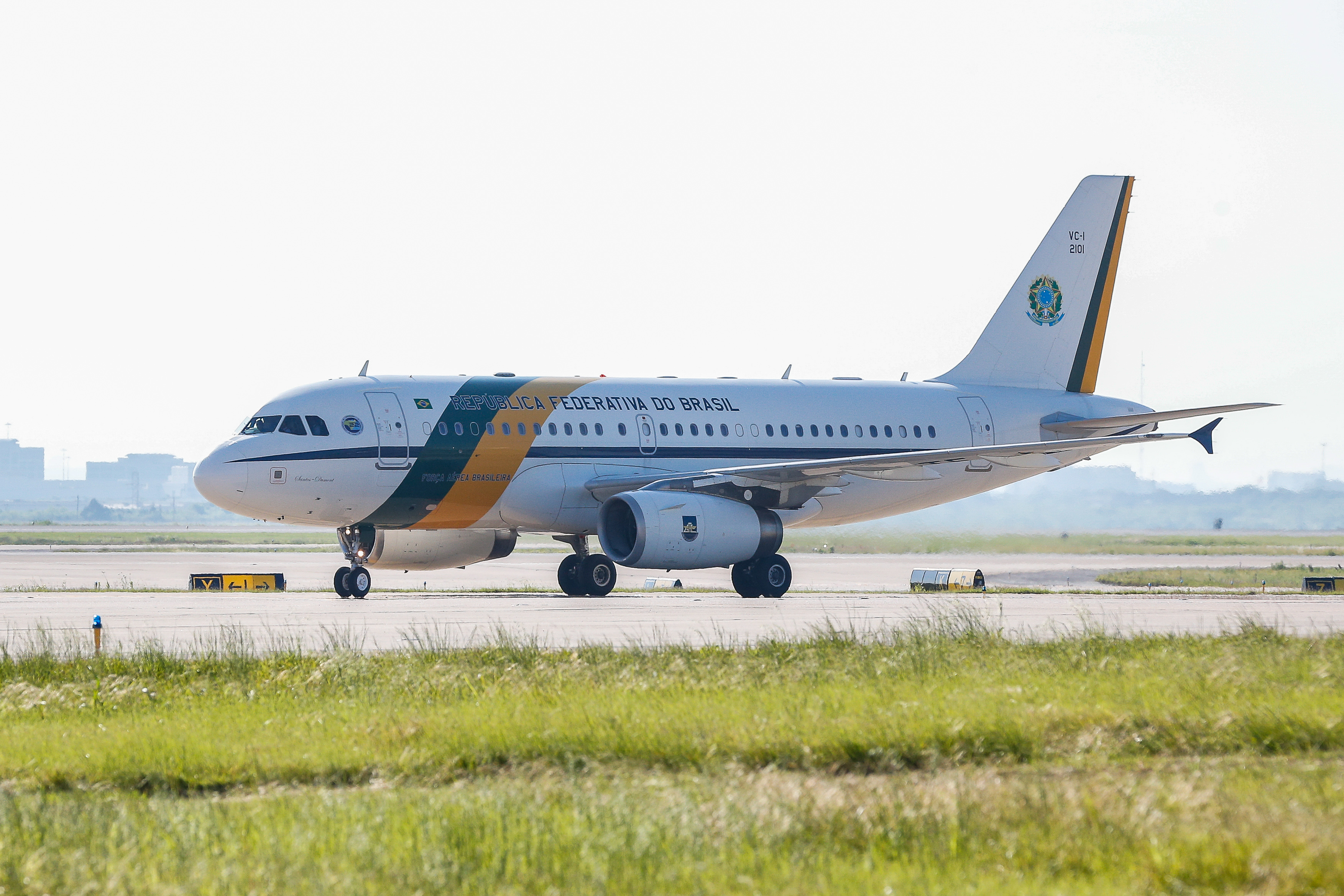
Airbus A319 VC-1A of the Brazilian Air Force One

The main Presidential aircraft used by the Brazilian Government is a modified Airbus A319, designated by the Brazilian Air Force as VC-1A and officially christened as the "Santos-Dumont", after the Brazilian aviation pioneer. For certain long-range flights the government uses a Boeing 767, which was leased from 2017 to 2025. For short-range flights the President is transported in one of the two modified Embraer 190 presidential jets.

=== Burundi ===
The government of Burundi previously operated a Gulfstream IV for use by the President.

=== Cambodia ===
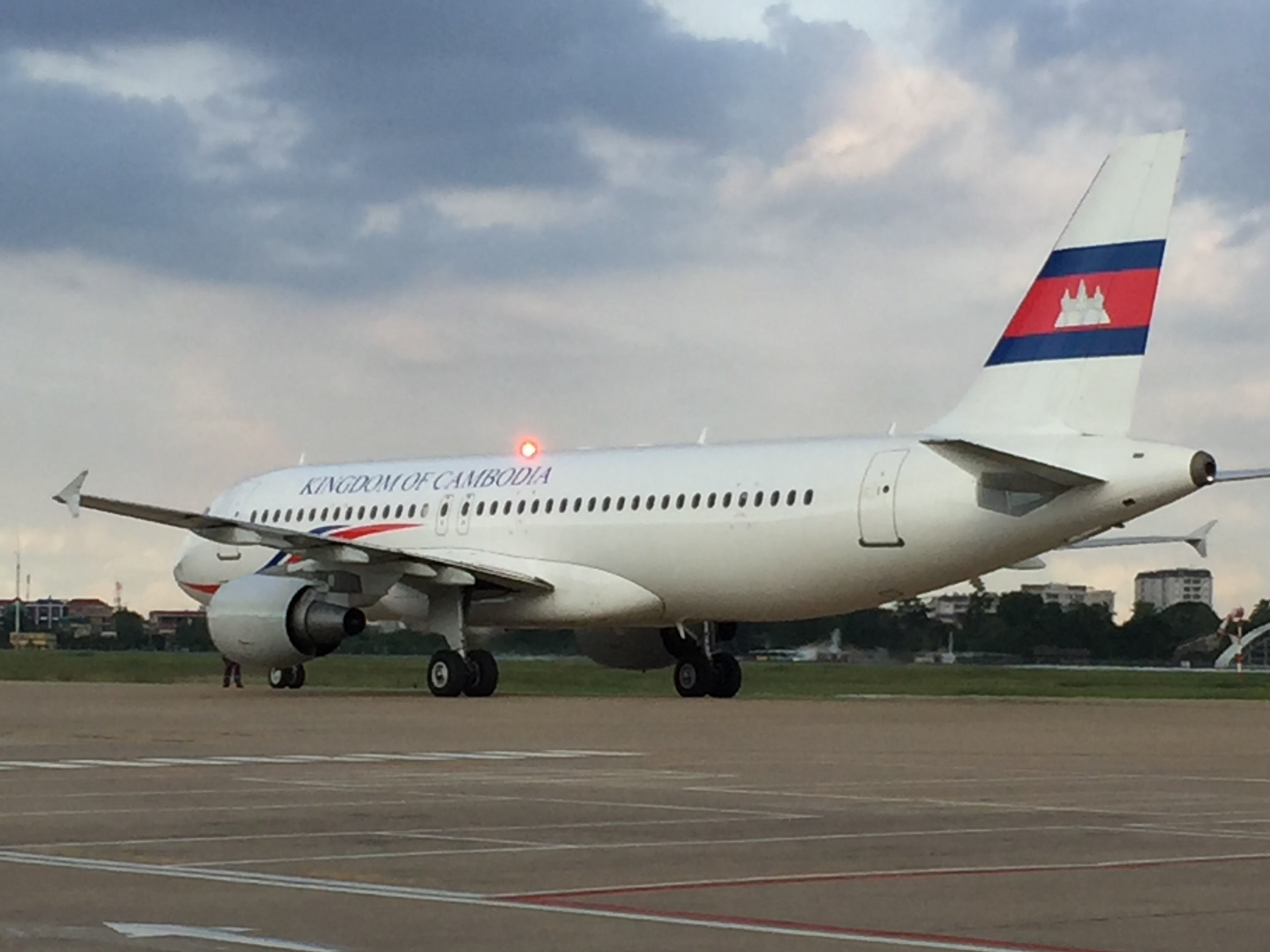
Kingdom of Cambodia A320 at Phnom Penh airport, 2015

The Kingdom of Cambodia operated a Chinese-registered Airbus A320 in 2015 which flies under the callsign KOC01.

=== Cameroon ===
In 2004, the Cameroonian government purchased a Boeing 767, believing it to be new. The aircraft developed multiple technical issues following its first flight, which resulted in the "Albatross scandal" - where multiple high-ranking political leaders were jailed for attempting to kill the president by sabotaging the plane.

=== Canada ===
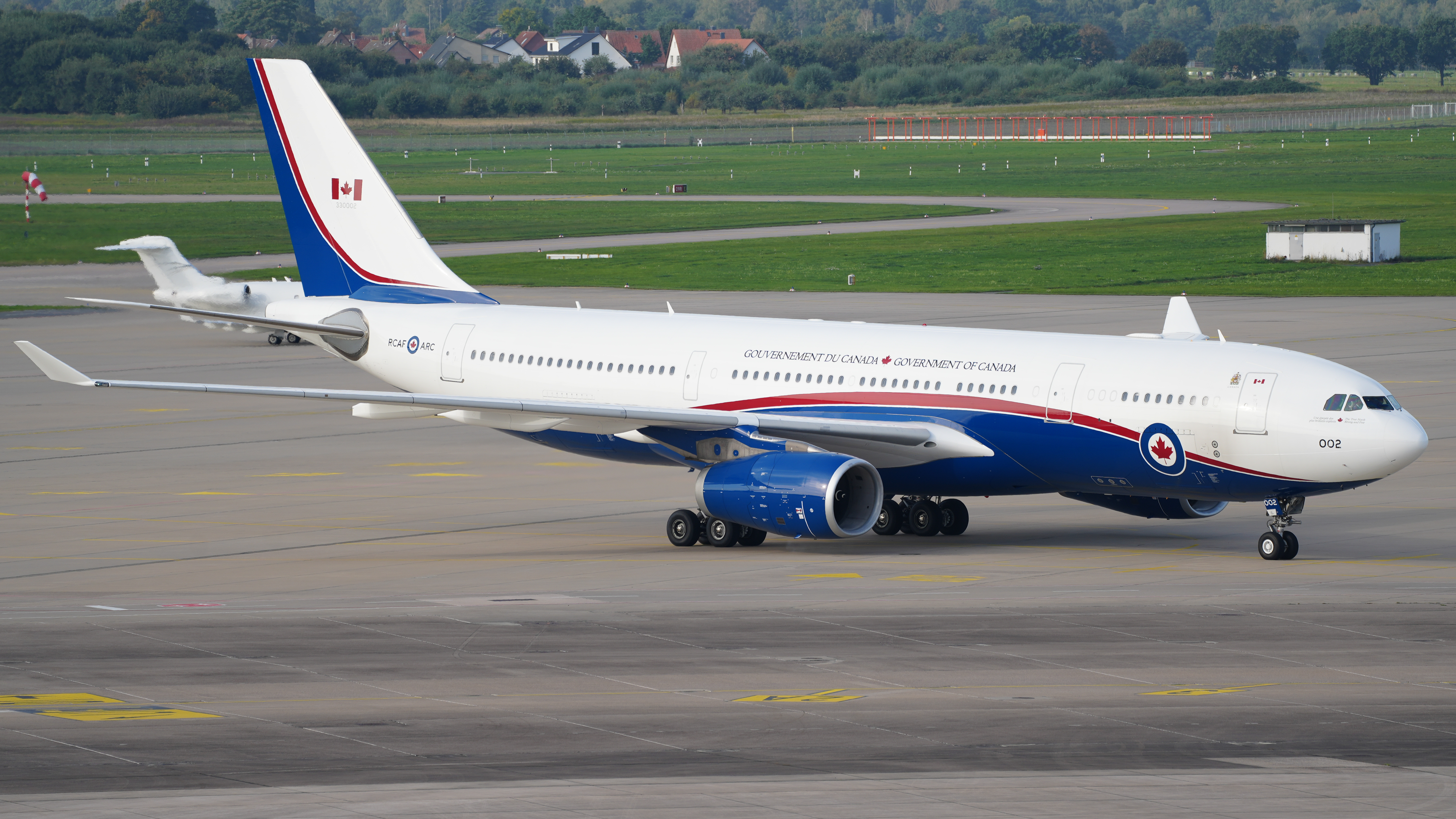
The CC-330 Husky is used to transport the Canadian monarch, governor general, and/or prime minister

The Royal Canadian Air Force operates 9 Airbus CC-330 Husky aircraft (Airbus A330), flown by crews of 437 Transport Squadron based at CFB Trenton; four are configured as normal airliners with cargo transport and aerial refueling capability, while 2, No. 002 and No. 003, are operated in a VIP configuration and charged with flying the monarch, other members of the Royal Family, the governor general, the prime minister, and other high-ranking government officials and foreign dignitaries, this aircraft flies with the callsign "CANFORCE (CFC) 01". The CC-330 Husky is primarily used for long-distance trips; for short-distance trips, four CC-144 aircraft (Bombardier Challenger 600), operated by 412 Squadron are used. On 5 June 2020, it was announced that two of the CC-144 aircraft based on model 601 would be replaced by newer airframes based on model 650 due to issues of compatibility of the upcoming ADS-B standards.

In November 2023, Prime Minister Justin Trudeau took his first flight aboard the refurbished Airbus A330-200 purchased from Kuwait Airways. The aircraft, known as Airbus 02, replaced the previous Airbus A310-300 known as Airbus 01.

=== Chile ===
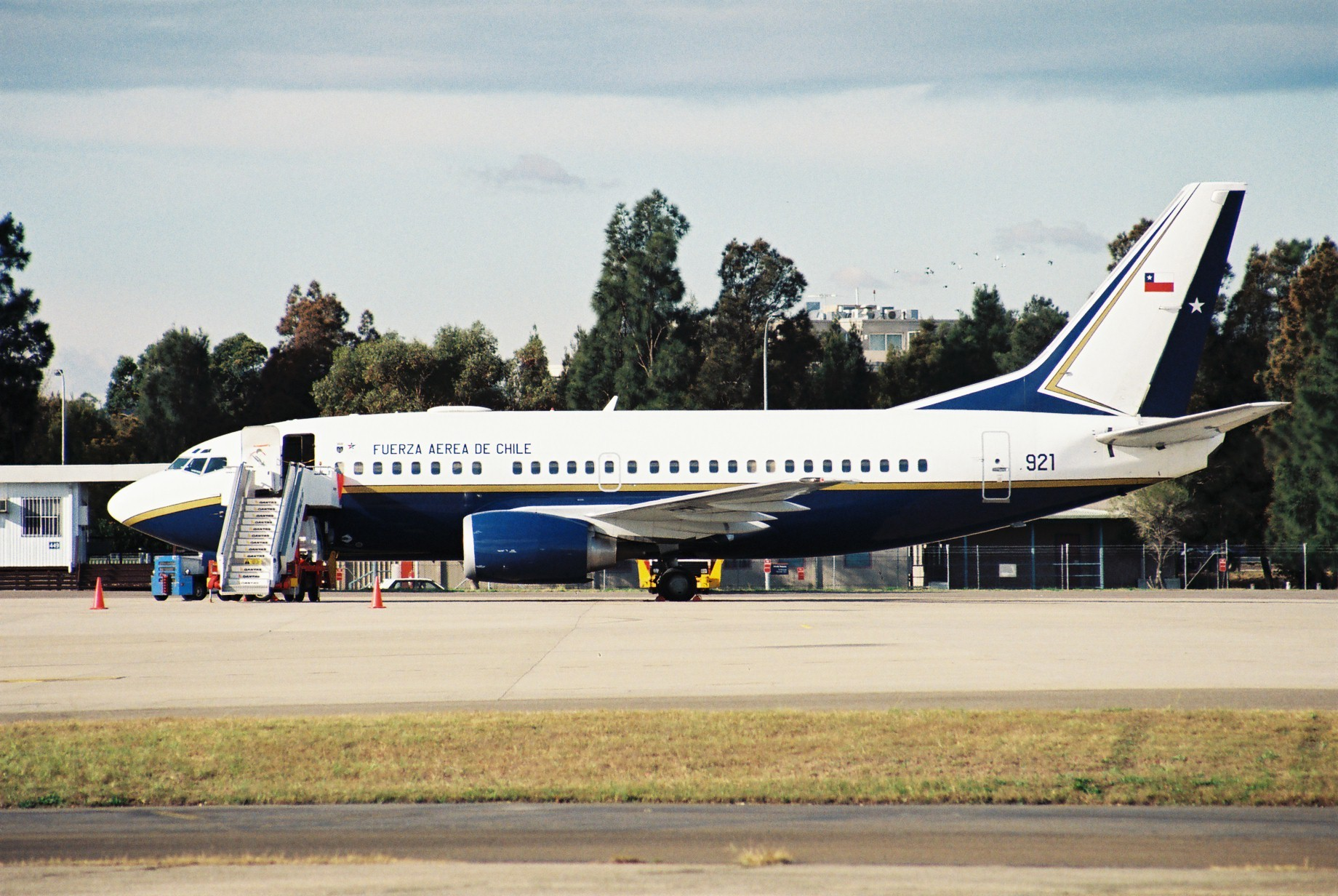
FACh Boeing 737-500 VIP transport at Sydney Airport in Australia

Transportation is under the responsibility of the Chilean Air Force, which includes a Boeing 767-300ER.

=== China ===
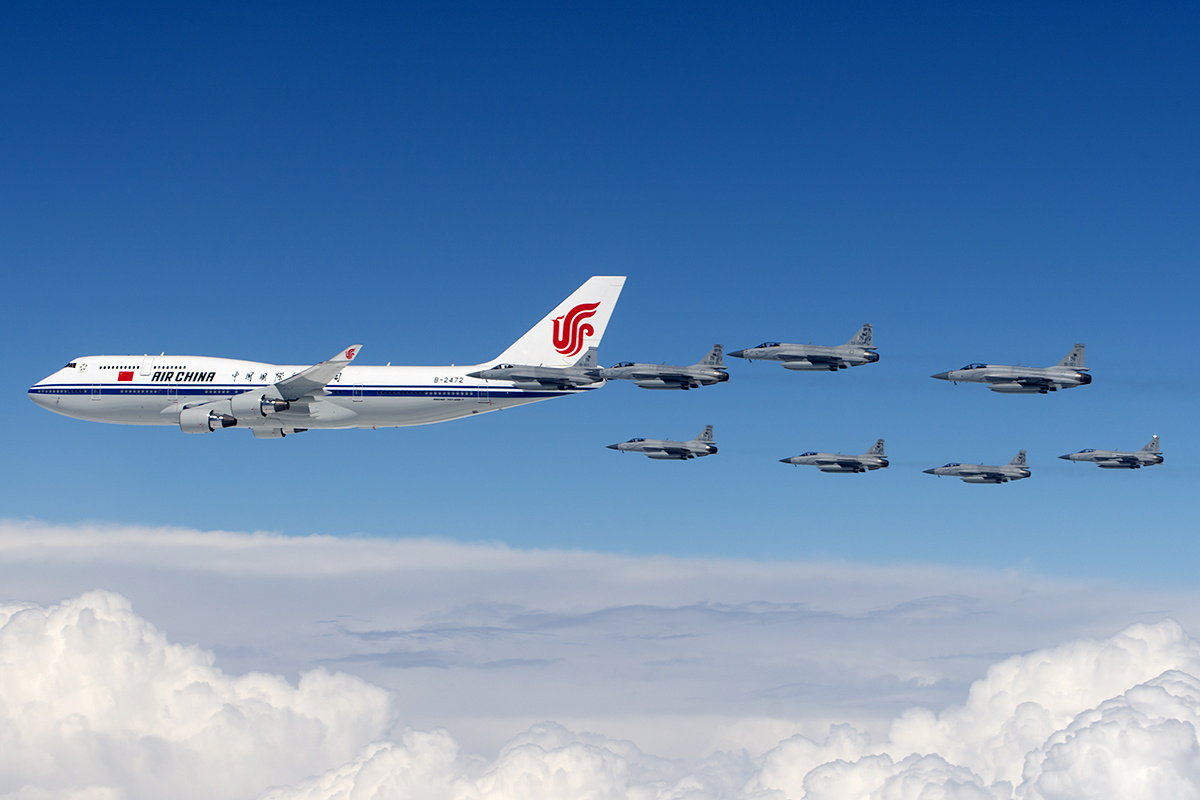
An Air China Boeing 747 carrying Chinese leader Xi Jinping, getting a ceremonial escort by eight Pakistani JF-17 Thunder fighter aircraft in Pakistani airspace on a two-day visit in 2015.

Air transportation for the CCP general secretary, president, premier or other government officials of China is managed and operated by the 34th division of the People's Liberation Army Air Force. Six Boeing 737-300s, two 737-700s, and four 737-800s, as well as three Airbus A319s and ten Bombardier Challenger 800 are used for these missions.

A Boeing 747-8I with Air China branding was converted and tested for exclusive use as head of state transport around 2016–2017. Although no official photos have been released, it is speculated that the interior is fitted with conference tables, private bedrooms, office suites, and more. A commercial Air China Boeing 747-4J6 has in the past been converted for international travel when necessary. At least one of them was specially retrofitted during official use and returned to commercial service afterwards; however, since 2020, all 747-400s have officially been retired from government use and have since been converted to a permanent commercial airline configuration.

A secondhand Boeing 767-300ER was purchased by the Chinese government for use by the then Chinese leader and CCP general secretary Jiang Zemin in 2000. An international incident occurred in 2001 when the government claimed it had discovered 27 bugs embedded in the aircraft's interior.

=== Colombia ===
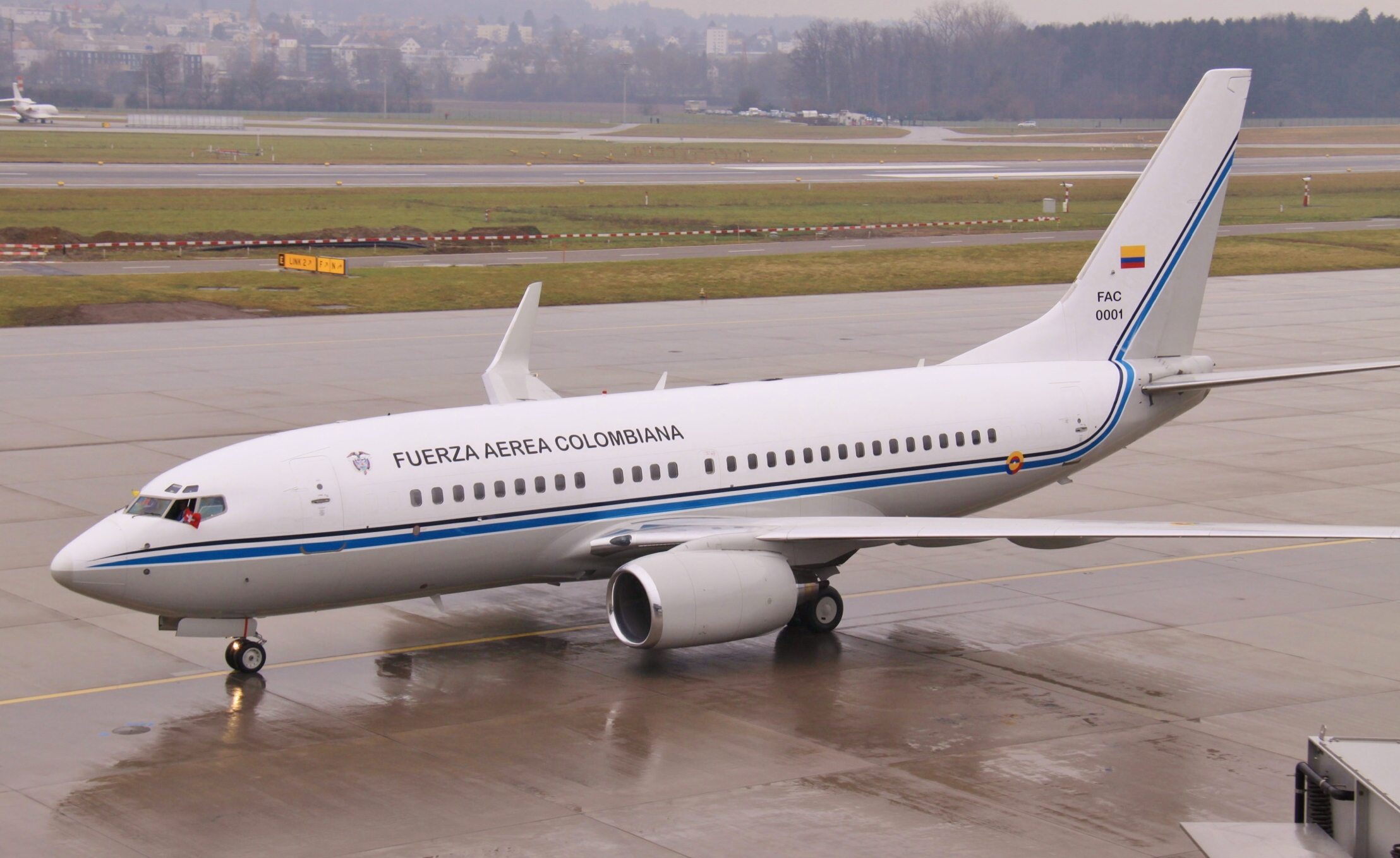
FAC-0001 of the Republic of Colombia at Zurich International Airport in 2014.

The current presidential plane used by the President of Colombia is FAC-0001, a Boeing 737-700 BBJ (Boeing Business Jet). The first presidential aircraft entered in service in 1933 during Enrique Olaya Herrera's presidency. It was a Junkers Ju 52/3mce which was kept in service until 1950. Along FAC 0001, the Colombian Aerospace Force also uses a Boeing KC-767 nicknamed "Jupiter"; it is used for longer flights.

=== Costa Rica ===
The Air Surveillance Service is a department in the Ministry of Public Security which is in charge of police surveillance in airspace. This department has one Beechcraft King Air F90-1 and one MD 600N helicopter. The aircraft are available for surveillance and transportation for the president of Costa Rica and other government dignitaries. In 2018 Costa Rica bought one Beechcraft King Air 250. Commercial aircraft are also used when necessary.

=== Croatia ===
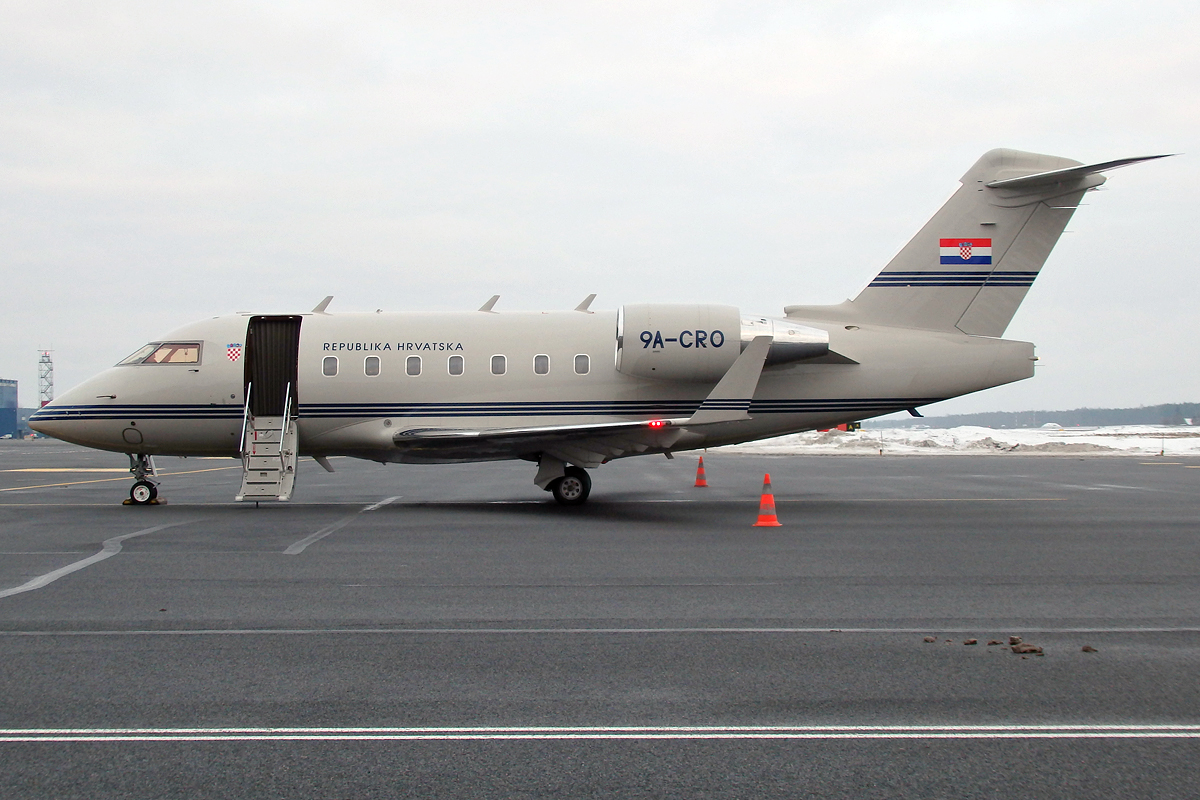
Croatian Government Bombardier CL604 Challenger in 2015

The Croatian government operates a variety of aircraft for official transport. Flights carrying the prime minister, president, and parliament speaker typically carry the call sign "9ACRO". Since 1997, the government has used a low-visibility greyed-out Bombardier Challenger CL604 specially outfitted by the Croatian Air Force. The Directorate for the Use of Official Aircraft is the service agency that operates these aircraft.

=== Cyprus ===
The government of Cyprus uses an Embraer ERJ-135BJ for travel, which was gifted by the Greek government in 2022.

=== Denmark ===
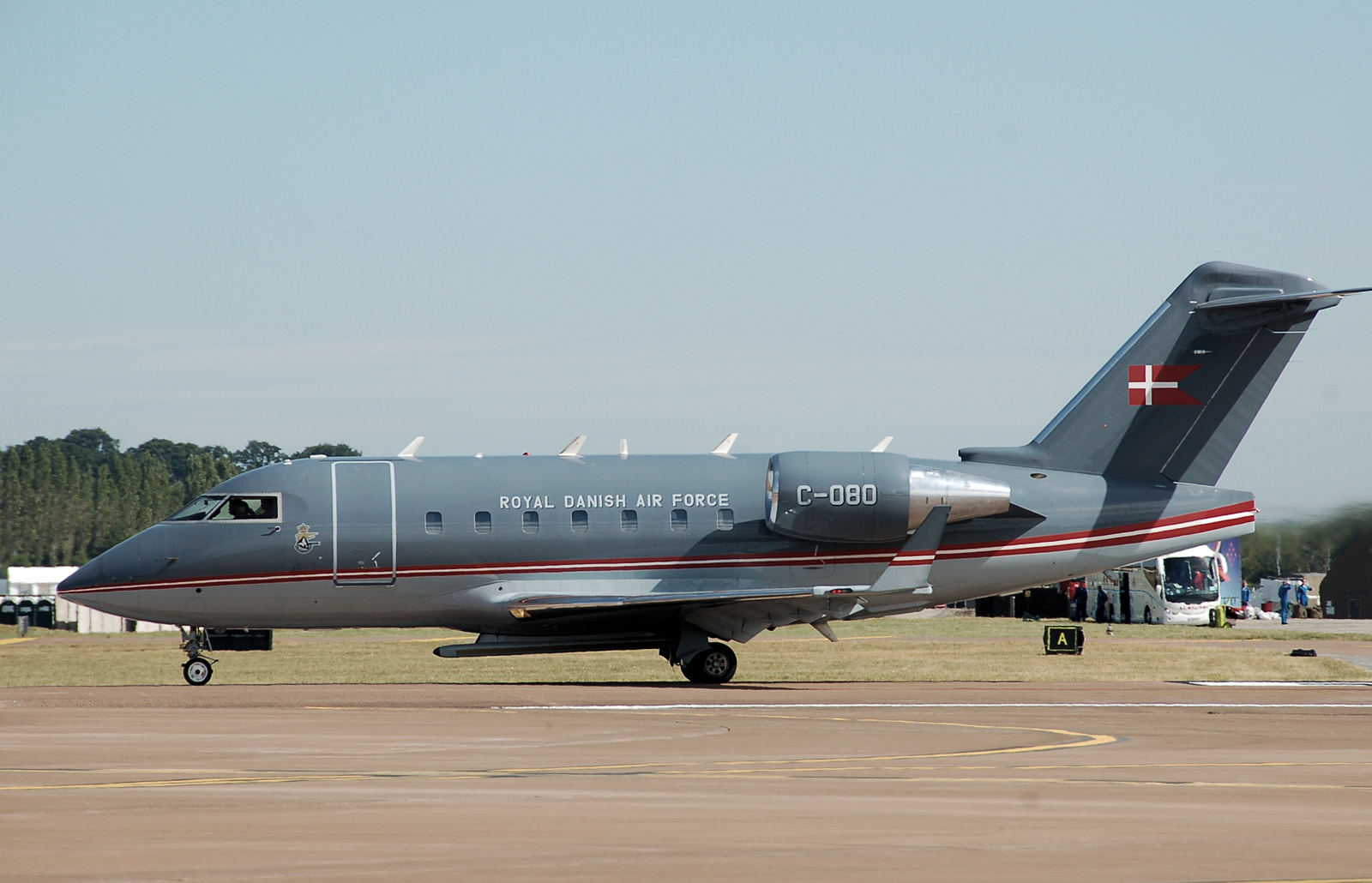
Royal Danish Air Force Bombardier Challenger CL-604

The Royal Danish Air Force operates four Bombardier Challenger 604s for VIP transport, primarily that of the government and the Danish Royal Family. These aircraft are also used for environmental control and fishery control around Greenland and the North Sea.

=== Ecuador ===
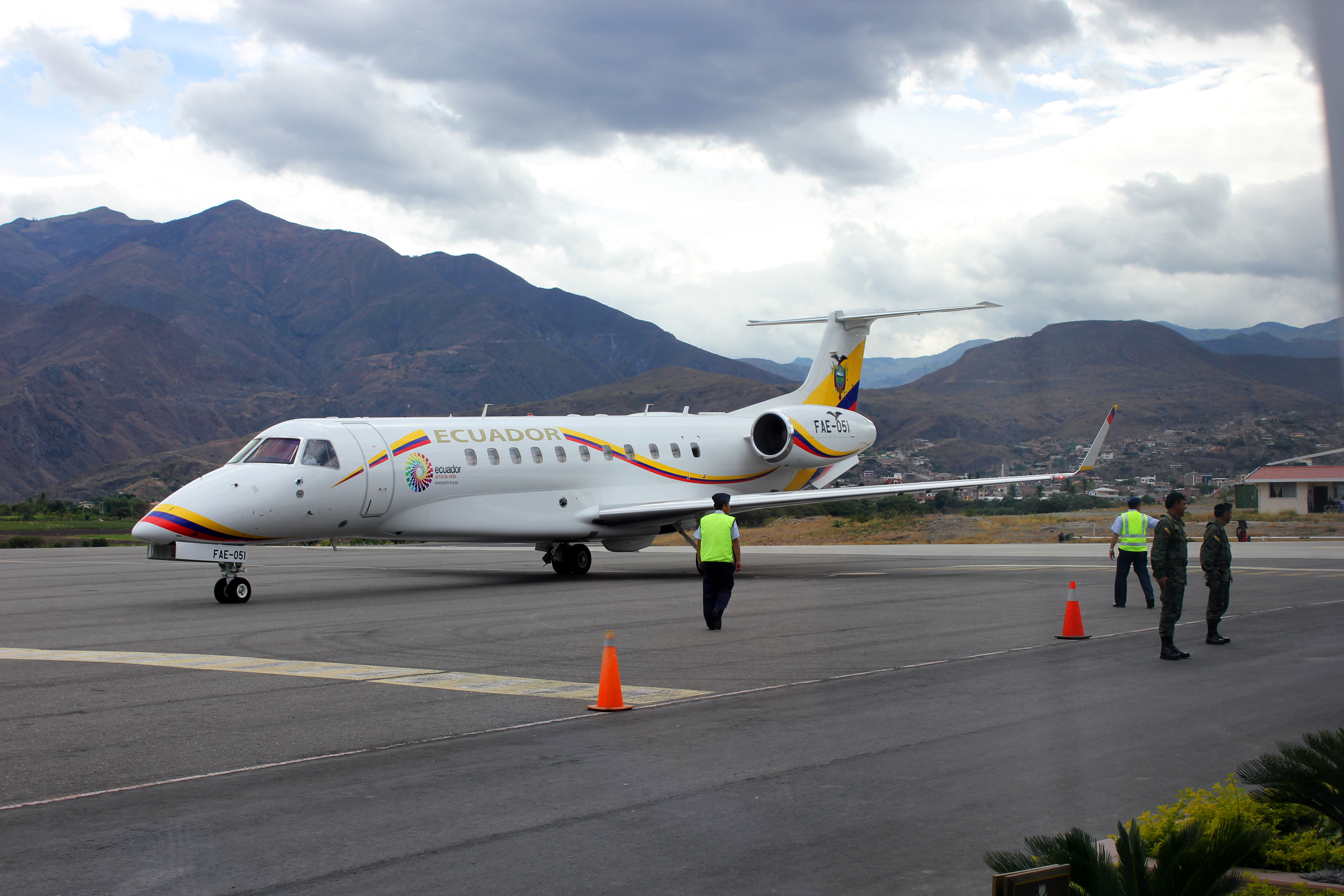
Rafael Correa's presidential Embraer Legacy 600 arriving at Camilo Ponce Enríquez Airport in Loja, Ecuador, in 2013.

Ecuador had a Dassault Falcon 7X and an Embraer Legacy 600 for presidential long and short range transport respectively, both acquired in recent years by Rafael Correa's government. They replaced an older fleet of Rockwell Sabreliners and Avro 748s. Aircraft from commercial airline TAME have also been used. In 2021, president Guillermo Lasso ordered the retirement and sale of the presidential plane as part of a decree to "rationalize public spending and balance the national budget by selling unproductive assets whose conservation would be inefficient or unnecessary".

=== Egypt ===
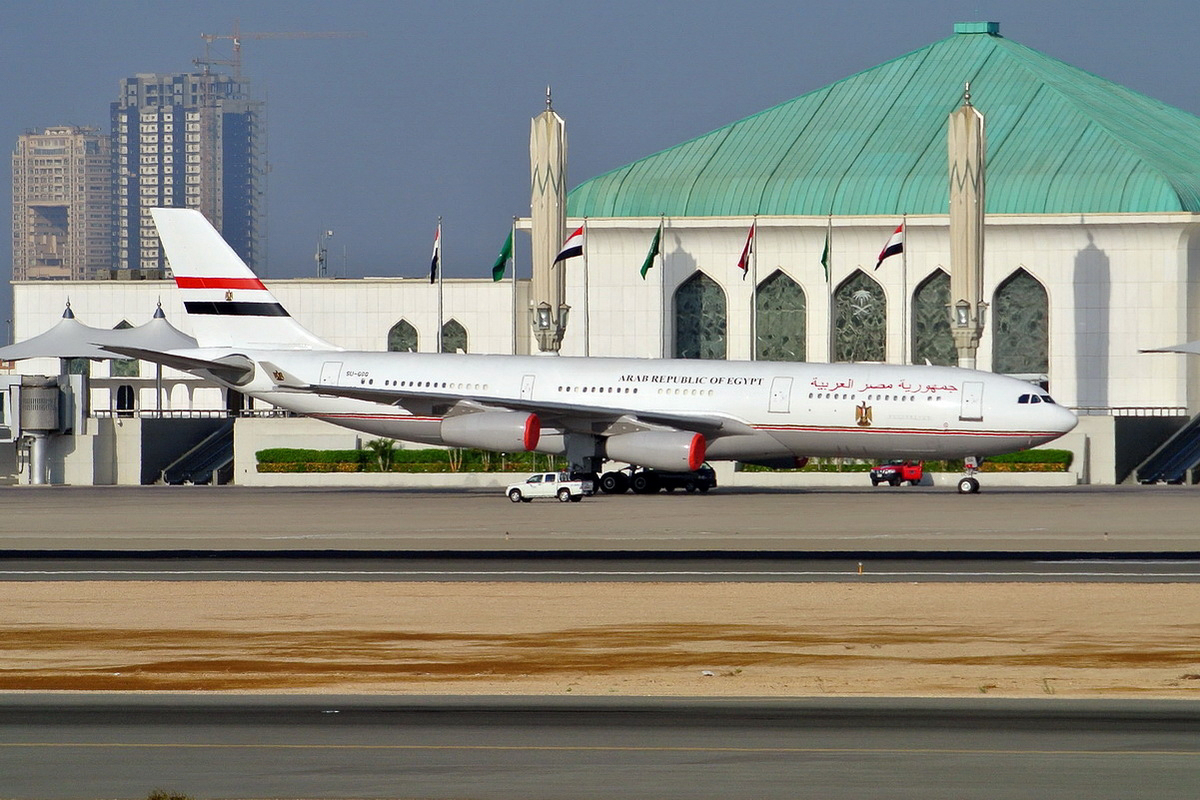
The A340-200 used by the Egyptian government since the mid-1990s.

The government of Egypt operated an Airbus A340-200, a Boeing B747-8 built for Lufthansa along with a number of business jets including the Gulfstream IV and Dassault Falcon 20s in 2015. As of 2022 the Boeing B747-8 was undergoing a refit in Germany and Ireland. It also uses two Dassault Aviation Dassault Falcon 7X, one Dassault falcon 8x and one Airbus A340 from 1995 bought by Hosni Mubarak.

=== Finland ===
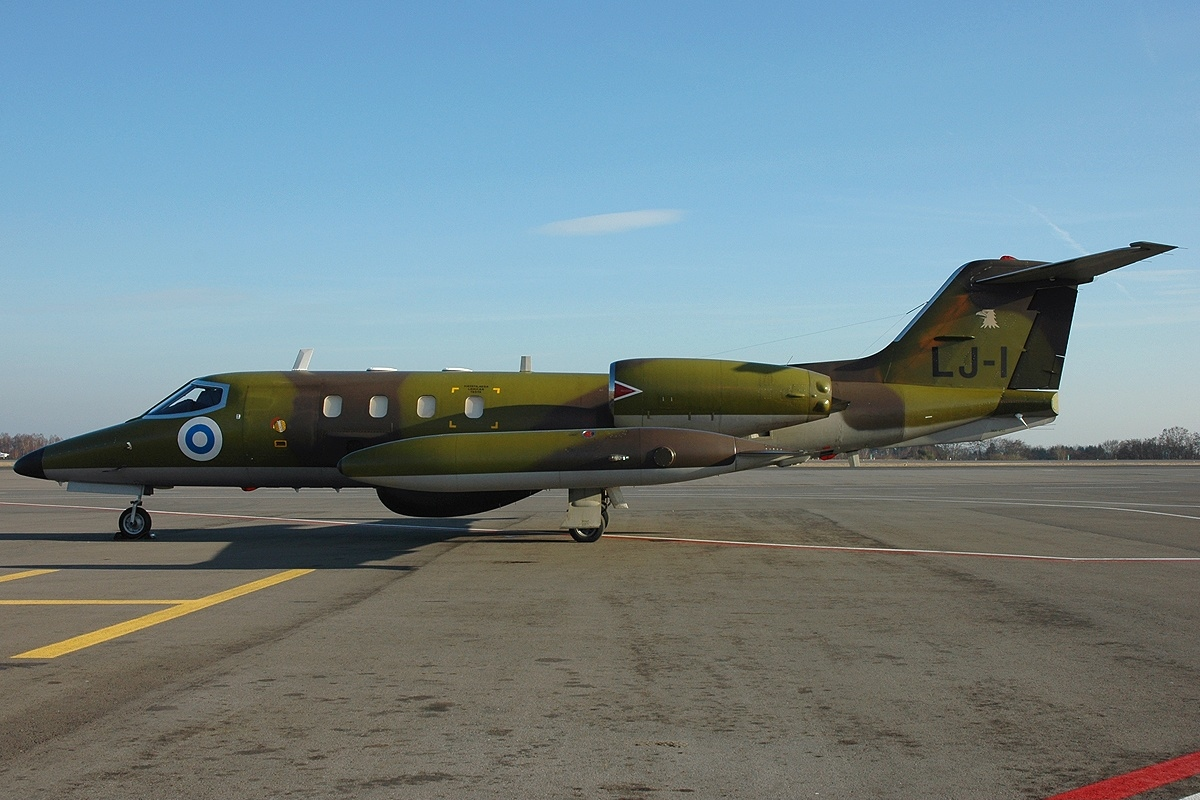
Finnish Air force Learjet UC-35A

The president and cabinet ministers usually travel on commercial flights for international travel. The Finnish Air Force operates three Learjet 35 aircraft with limited transport capability for use by senior government and military officials, and other aircraft from the Finnish Air Force can also be used. Helicopters of the Finnish Army or Coast Guard are used to provide transport to senior officials on some domestic trips.

Juha Sipilä, the prime minister between 2015 and 2019 was an avid aviator, who also made official trips with aircraft that he has personally flown and paid for, such as a Cessna CitationJet/M2 525 and a Scanwings Cessna 525. The longest trip was to Ulaanbaatar in 2016.

=== France ===
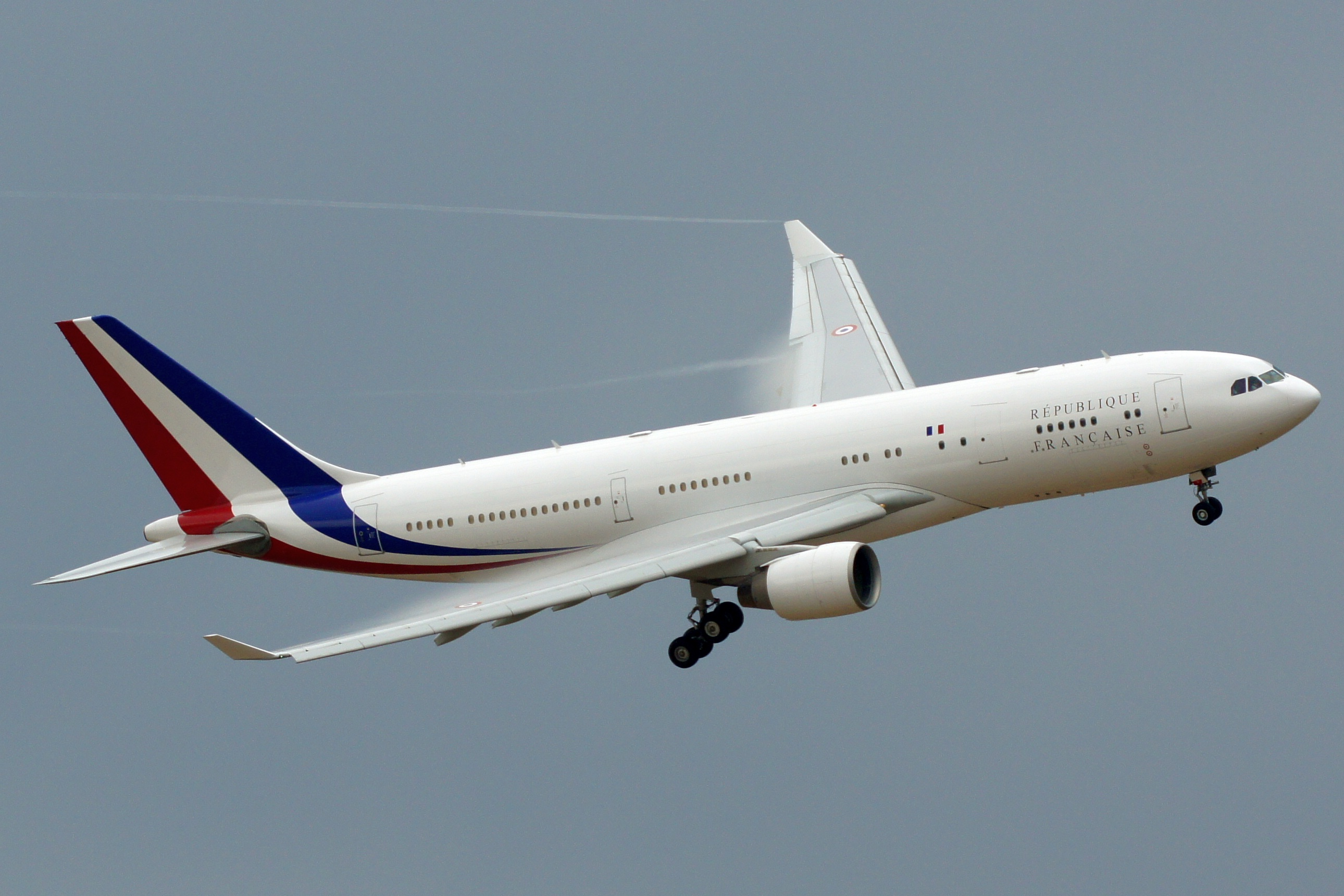
French President's Airbus A330-200 used since November 2011.

French officials use the aircraft of the Escadron de transport 3/60 Esterel, which operates three Airbus A310-304 and two Airbus A340-200s.

=== Georgia ===
Georgian Airways operated a single Bombardier Challenger 850 since 2007 to carry the President of Georgia and government officials. In 2011, a Gulfstream 450 was added to its inventory, possibly replacing the Challenger in its VIP transport role.

=== Germany ===
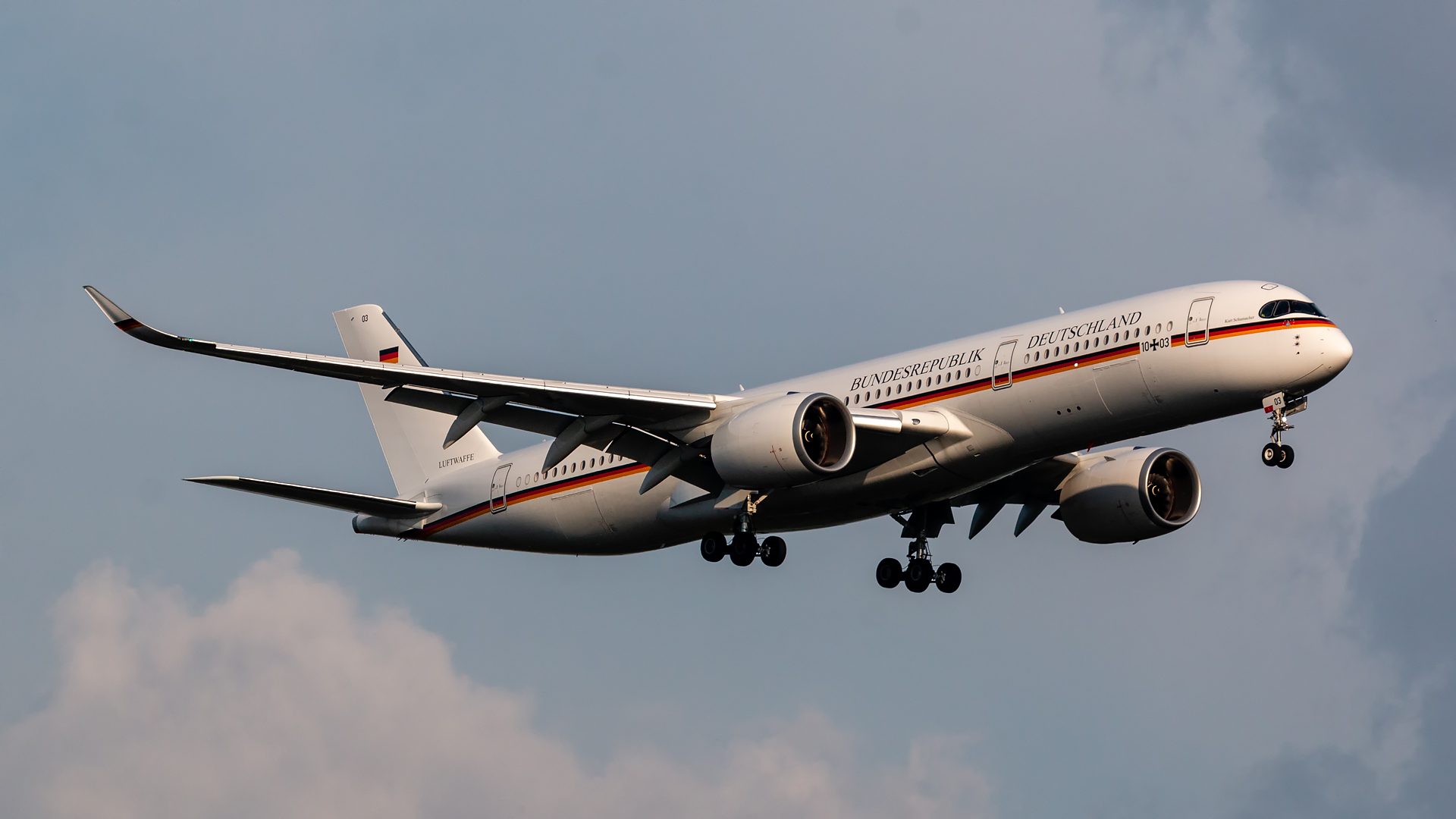
Germany's Airbus A350-941 VIP 10+03 "Kurt Schumacher", shown here in Berlin.

The fleet used by Germany's senior government officials consists of 17 aircraft:

Airbus A350-900	3
Airbus A319-133X CJ	2
Airbus A321-200	1
Airbus A321LR	2
Bombardier Global 5000	3
Bombardier Global 6000	3
Eurocopter AS532 Cougar	3

Until 2011 Germany's government officials used two Airbus A310-304 VIP carrying the same names, previously of East Germany's Interflug. They used two Airbus A340-313X VIP aircraft until 2023, previously of Germany's Lufthansa, redesigned by Lufthansa Technik in a VIP configuration, including sleeping rooms and an anti-missile system. The aircraft are named after Konrad Adenauer, the first chancellor of (West) Germany, and Theodor Heuss, its first President. In April 2019, the German Air Force ordered three Airbus A350-900 as their new government planes and as a replacement for the aging A340s.

In Summer 2019, the Luftwaffe also ordered three Bombardier Global 6000 as an addition to the existing fleet. In 2022, the fleet was expanded by two A321LRs, which are used for both troop transport and government flight operations.

=== Ghana ===
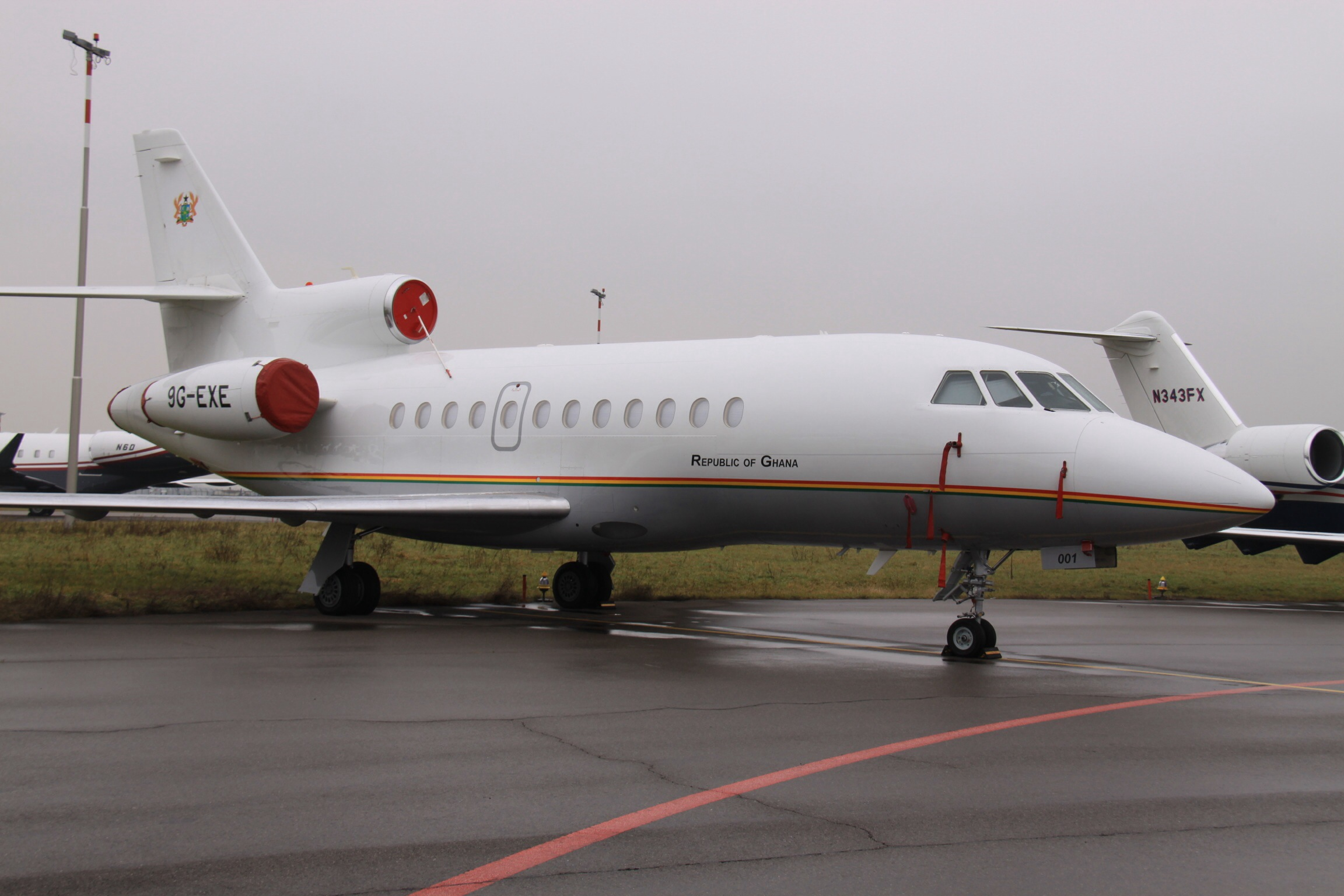
Republic of Ghana Falcon 900EX

The government of Ghana operated a Dassault Falcon 900EX. However, after suffering extensive corrosion, it was deemed unsafe for the president to fly on and was subsequently parked.

=== Greece ===
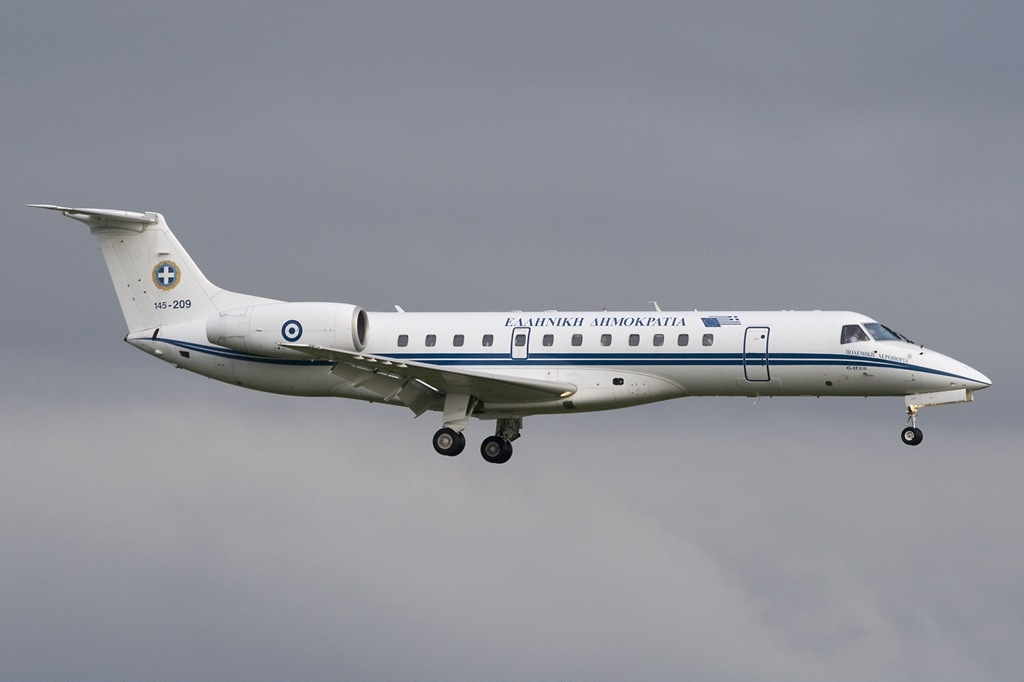
Hellenic Republic Embraer ERJ-135LR

The 352 VIP Transport Squadron is part of the 112 Combat Wing (Hellenic Air Force Support Command). Based at Elefsina Air Force Base it air transport services for senior government officials and high-ranking military officers. The Squadron operates a Gulfstream V, which was bought by the government of Costas Simitis for the needs of Greece's 2003 EU presidency and the preparations of the 2004 Olympic Games. It also operates an Embraer ERJ-135LR with a 32-eat configuration. For long haul flights the Prime Minister and other officials used one of the Airbus A340-300s of the government-owned Olympic Airlines when they were still in service. The A340 aircraft were used for the official visit of the Greek Prime Minister to Australia in 2007. Two other aircraft used over the last two decades for the same purpose raised controversy. A Dassault Falcon 900 (OA Flight 3838) had a range of technical problems culminating in an accident that killed the Deputy Minister of Foreign Affairs Giannos Kranidiotis and six other people due to severe in-flight pitch oscillations 20 minutes before landing at Bucharest on 9 September 1999.

Under executive order 2954/28-8-12, the Greek government bestowed the 30-seat Embraer to the Hellenic Air Force to be used for pilot training, patient airlift and organ transplant transportation.

In 2021 the Hellenic Air Force incorporated a lightly used Falcon 7X into its fleet VIP transport fleet, donated by Dassault free of charge in order to fulfill a long-standing offset obligation dating back to 2000 when the Hellenic Air Force had acquired Mirage 2000-5s. The aircraft has 12-seat configuration.

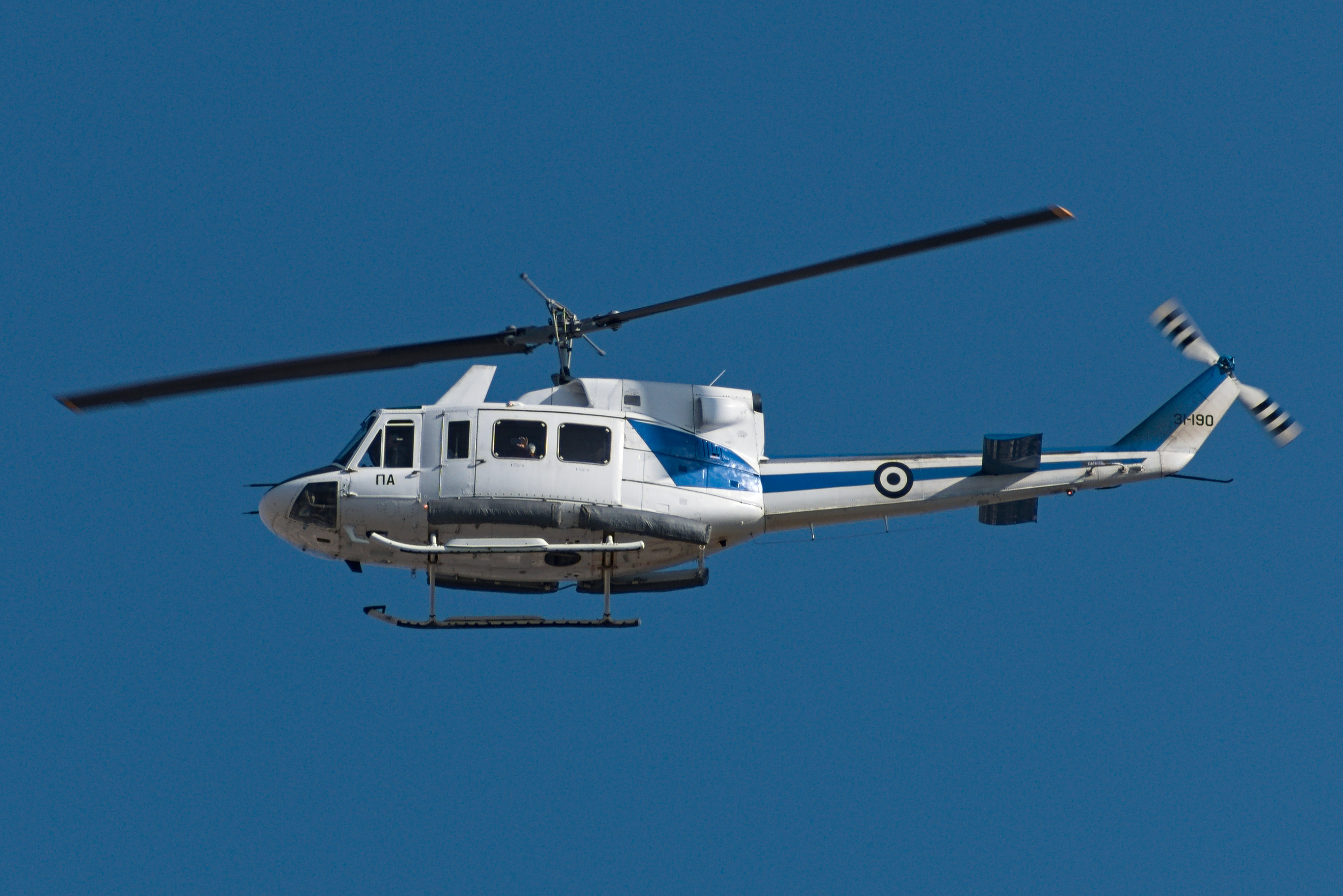
Bell 212 of 358 SAR Squadron of 112 CW

In September 2022 the ERJ-135BJ was transferred to the Republic of Cyprus.

Alternatively, the 358 Search and Rescue Squadron of the 112 Combat Wing operates B-212 helicopters, which can also be used for VIP transport for locations with no airport. They were acquired in 1976.

=== Honduras ===
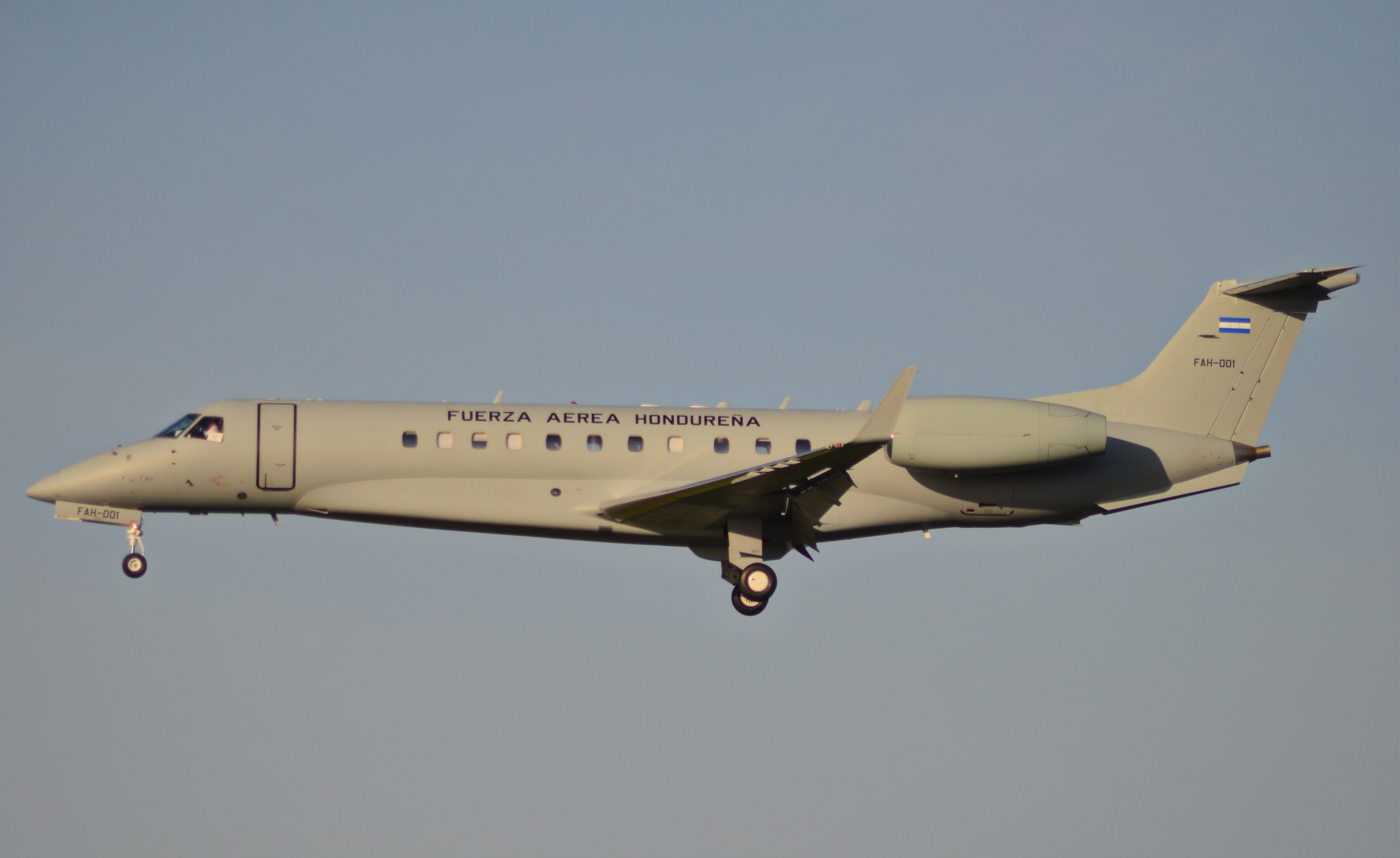
Honduras Air Force EMB135BJ

The Honduran President used an IAI Westwind aircraft owned by the Honduran Air Force until October 2014 when it was changed for an Embraer Legacy 600. Xiomara Castro promised during her presidential campaign in 2022 to sell the aircraft and fly commercially and use the money for social projects for the poor. She was later spotted using commercial aircraft during a state visit to China.

=== Hungary ===
The Hungarian government uses two Dassault Falcon 7X and two Airbus A319 airliners, which are operated by the Hungarian Air Force and fly under its callsigns (HUAF).

=== India ===
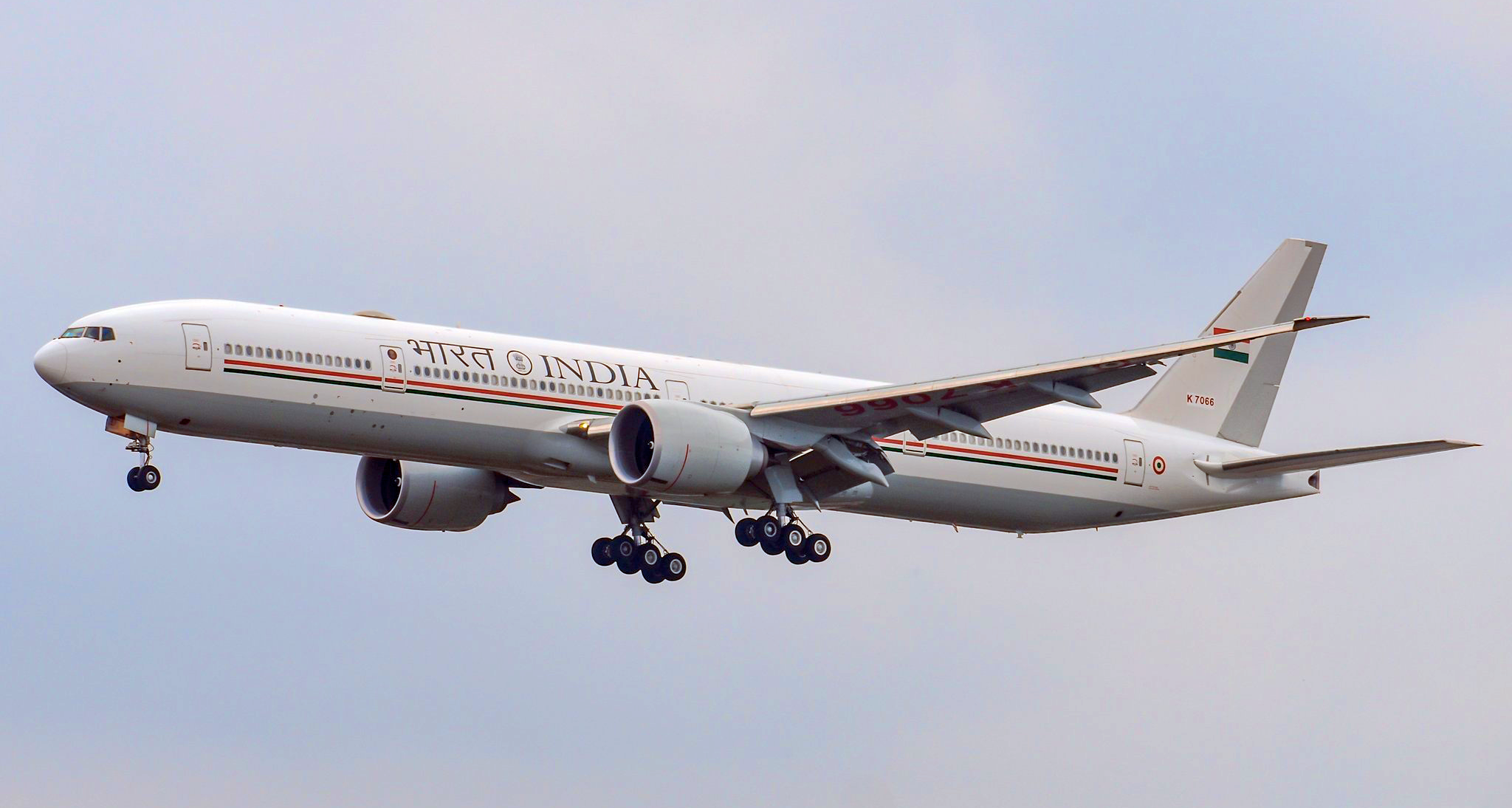
Air India One B777-300ER used by the President, Vice President and Prime Minister of India.

India One (AIC001) is the callsign of any aircraft with the President, Vice President or the Prime Minister of India on board. For international travel, two dedicated Indian Air Force Boeing 777-300ERs which arrived in October 2020 are used. The aircraft are equipped with encrypted satellite communication facilities and advanced navigation aids. The jets are also equipped with an advanced missile warning system, a missile deflecting shield, and electronic countermeasures to provide protection from any ground-based or airborne threat. The aircraft are also equipped with flares and glares to mislead any missile.

For domestic and short distance international travel, three Boeing 737 BBJ aircraft are used. The three Boeing 737-200 also used by the President, the Vice President or the Prime Minister were inducted in 2008.

Other aircraft used by other government officials are four 14-seater Embraer 135s.

=== Indonesia ===
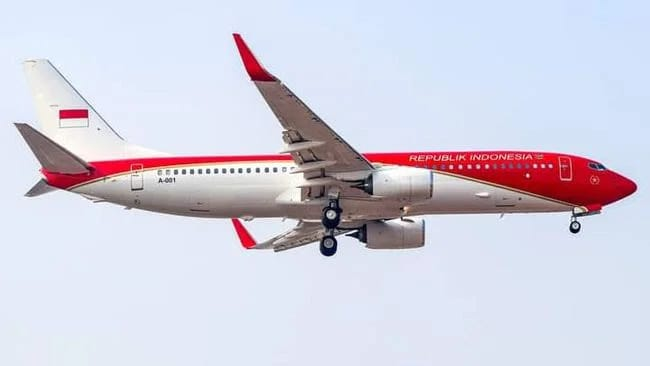
Indonesia One is the Indonesian presidential plane since 2014, the business jet version of Boeing 737-800.

As Indonesia is a sprawling archipelagic nation, the president of Indonesia frequently needs VIP air transportation for visiting Indonesian provinces, attending international summits and meetings, and traveling on official foreign visits. In April 2014, Indonesia acquired Indonesia One, an aircraft dedicated to transportation of the president and the vice president and their entourage.

When Indonesia One was delivered in 2014, the government claimed the cost of operating its own aircraft would be lower than chartering Garuda aircraft. The aircraft is the Boeing Business Jet variant of the 737-800. The aircraft was designed to meet the minimum safety and security requirements of Indonesia's VIP air transportation, and includes a modest self-defense system.

In 2020, the Indonesian government chartered a Boeing 777-300ER, from Garuda Indonesia for special use as a presidential aircraft on long-haul flights; the aircraft is painted in a special livery.

=== Iran ===
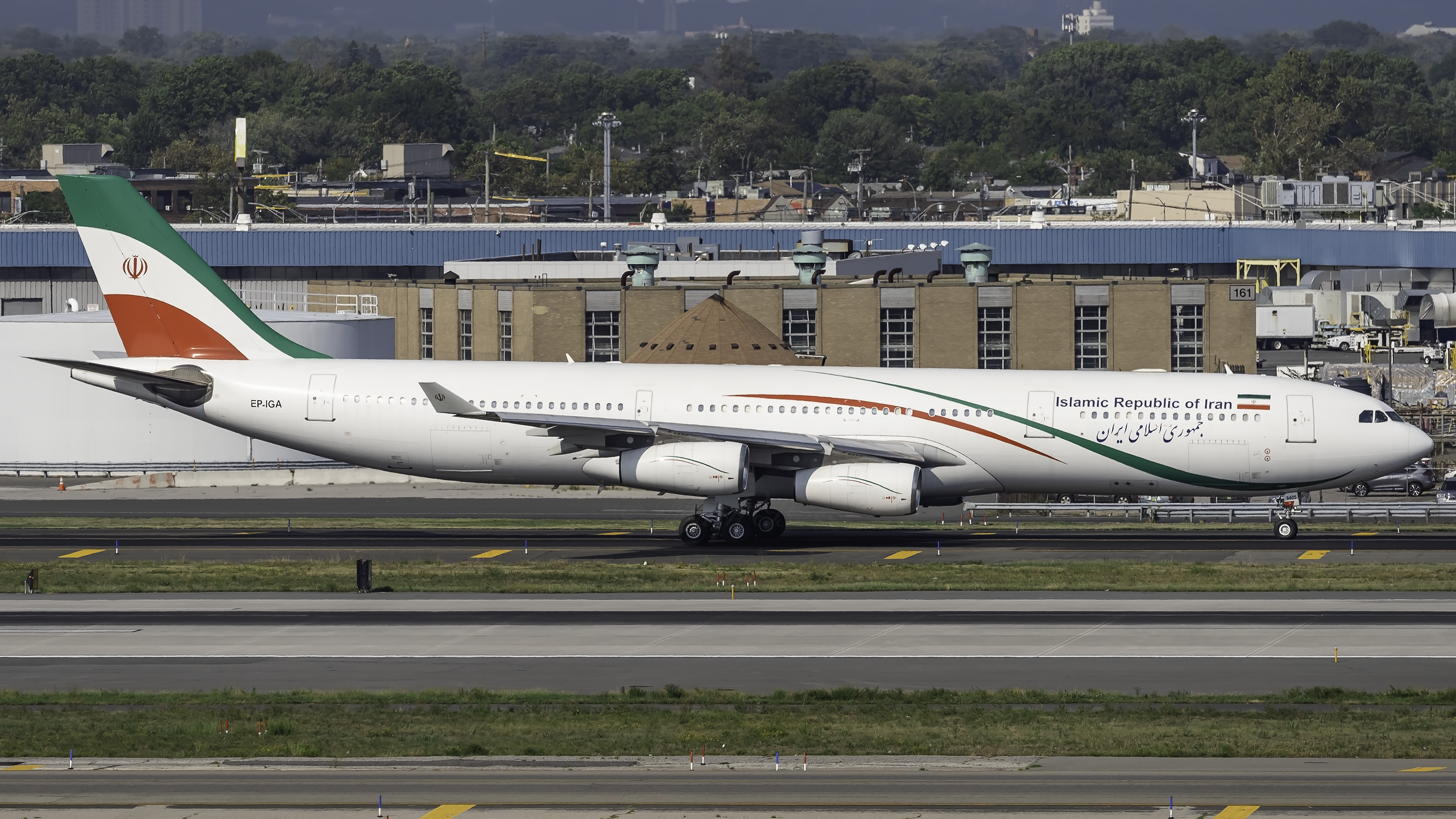
Former Iranian Government aircraft EP-IGA at JFK airport in 2023.

Since 2026, The Government of Iran operates an A340-311, previously belonging to Iran Aseman Airlines.

The former Supreme Leader Ayatollah Ali Khamenei's Airbus A340-313 was reportedly destroyed during the 2026 Iran war, as stated by the Israeli military.

Iranian government officials have been seen using a government-branded Dassault Falcon 900EX, as well as a VIP-modified Avro RJ for official travels. In addition, there have been instances of civilian aircraft owned by Meraj Airlines being chartered for state travels.

The current President of Iran Masoud Pezeshkian uses an Airbus A340-300 for international visits. The new A340-300 was formerly owned by Iran Aseman Airlines. The former A340-300 was destroyed during 2026 Iran war

The president of Iran, Ebrahim Raisi, and others died on 19 May 2024, when an Iranian Air Force Bell 212 helicopter crashed near the village of Uzi, East Azerbaijan, Iran. Former presidents Abolhassan Banisadr (served 1980–1981) and Mahmoud Ahmadinejad (served 2005–2013) were both involved in helicopter crashes during their terms in office, but each survived.

=== Ireland ===
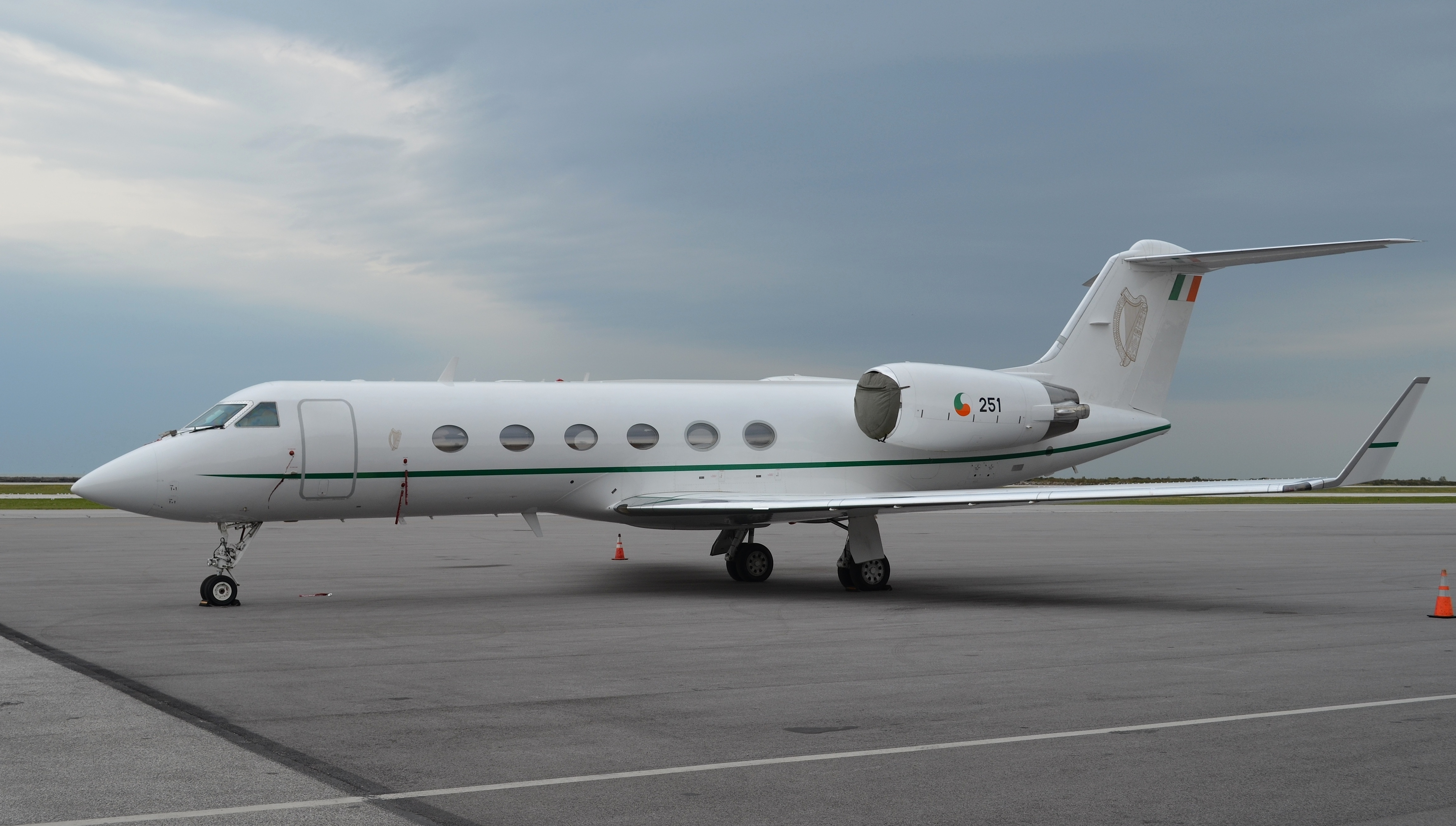
Irish Air Corps Gulfstream IV previously used as VIP Transport

The Irish Ministerial Air Transport Service (MATS) is part of the Irish Air Corps, it provides secure transport to the President of Ireland, the Taoiseach, the Tánaiste, and members of the government and their staff, both within and outside Ireland.

A Dassault Falcon 6X is currently used by The Irish Ministerial Air Transport Service. The Air Corps AW139 helicopters are also used as government transport.

=== Israel ===
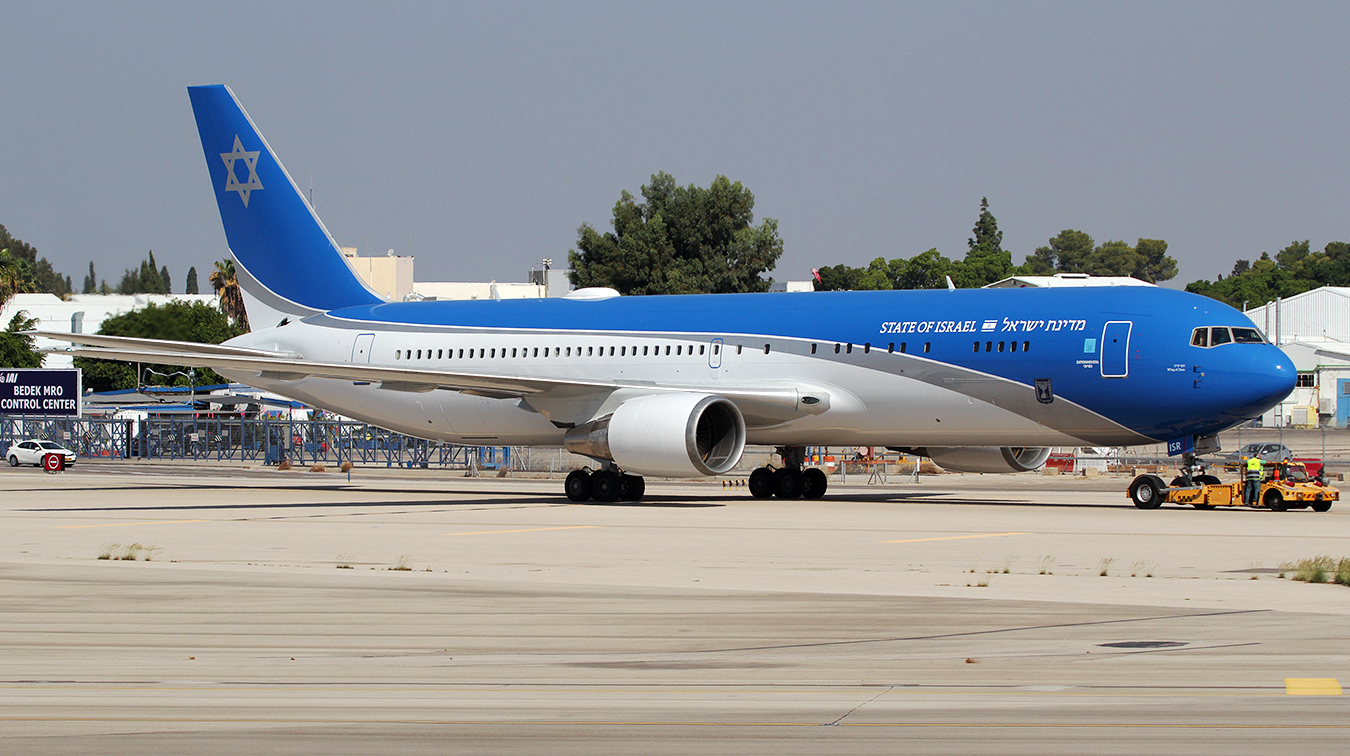
Wing of Zion undergoing final tests.

Since 1948, senior officials of the Israel government, including the President and the Prime Minister, have either travelled on military aircraft supplied by the Israeli government or on commercially-chartered aircraft.

In the early years of Israel's existence, prime minister David Ben-Gurion travelled using military aircraft belonging to the Israeli Air Force (IAF), such as the Douglas DC-3. However, in the 1960s, the IAF chose to use a specially-adapted Boeing 377 Stratocruiser, for ministerial travel abroad. From the 1970s onwards, government officials were transported internationally using second-hand Boeing 707 aircraft, which were purchased beforehand from commercial airlines and specifically configured for VIP transportation. The 707 was retired by the IAF in 2001.

Beginning from the 2000s, senior Israeli government officials have been transported abroad using commercial airliners leased by the Ministry of Defense from El Al. For short-range international flights, El Al's inventory of Boeing 737 aircraft have been customarily used, while the larger wide-body aircraft such as the Boeing 767 and 777 have been supplied for long-range transcontinental travel. Nonetheless, this practice has been criticized for its annual incurrence of high costs stemming from leasing and transportation, in addition to the planes' lack of secure communication facilities.

In April 2014, Israel's Cabinet approved a decision to procure an aircraft dedicated exclusively for the transport of the president and the prime minister. The move, which specified the purchase of a second-hand airliner and its reconfiguration for VIP transport, was initially estimated to cost around NIS 393 million. In 2016, Israel purchased a second-hand Boeing 767-300ER originally operated by Qantas, which had first flown in 2000. The 767, dubbed the Knaf Zion (Wing of Zion) was retrofitted with infrared missile-defense countermeasures and a secure communications suite over a span of two years, and first flew in November 2019.

=== Italy ===
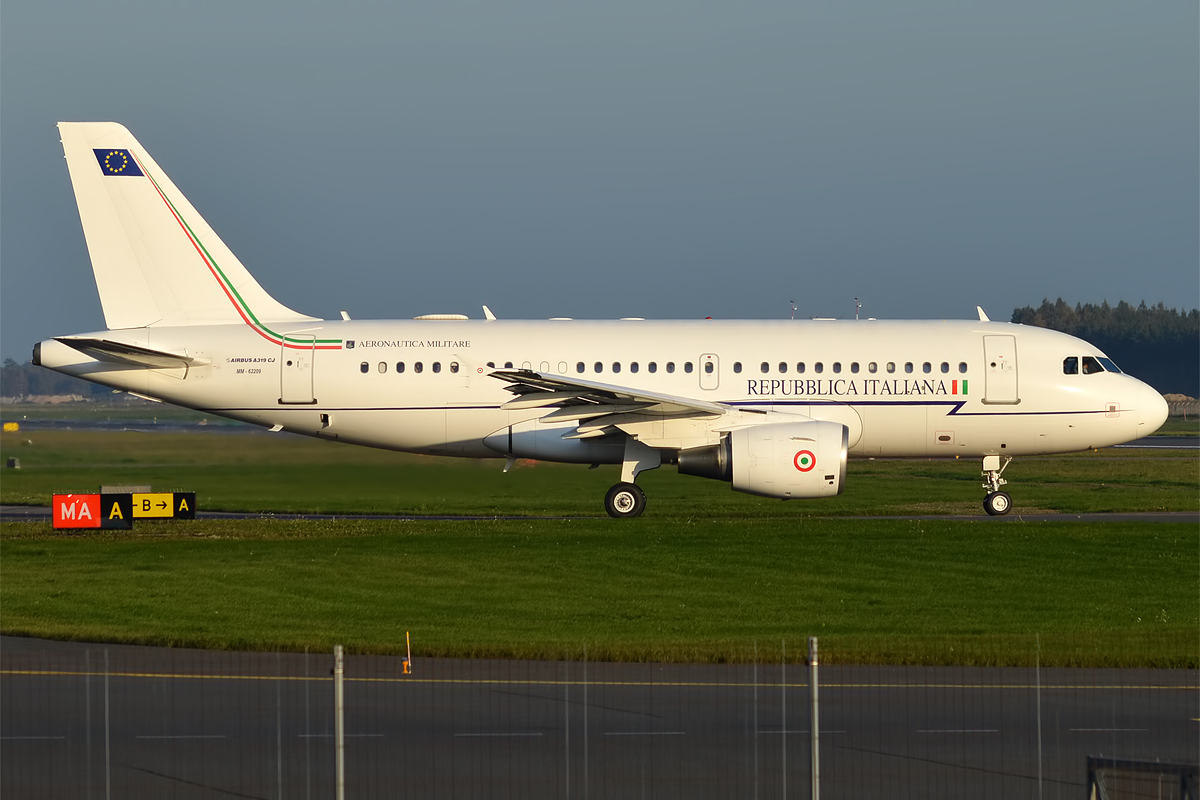
Airbus VC-319A – 31st Wing, Italian Air Force

The Italian Air Force operates three Airbus A319-115 ACJs (Italian Air Force designation: VC-319A), three Dassault Falcon 900s (VC-900) and two Dassault Falcon 50s (VC-50) for government transport. From April 2025, the Falcons are being replaced by five Gulfstream G650ERs (VC-650A). Two AgustaWestland AW139s are operated for use by the President and senior government officials, and are also used by the Pope. An Airbus A340-541 was previously utilized for longer-distance trips and phased out in 2018. All aircraft and helicopters are operated by the 31st Wing based in Ciampino Air Base, Rome.

=== Japan ===
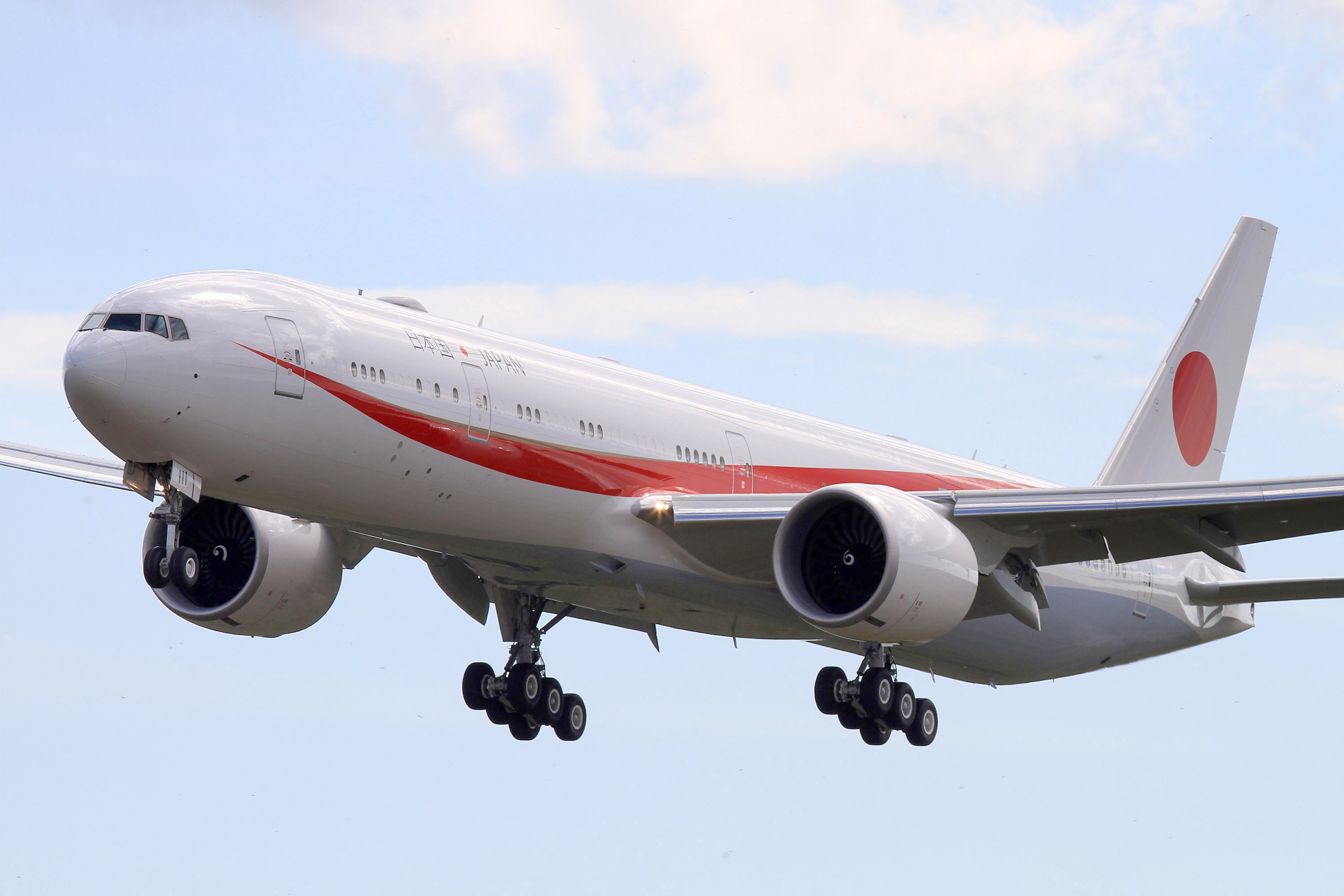
Japanese Air Force One (Boeing 777-300ER)

The Japan Air Self-Defense Force operates two Boeing 777-300ER aircraft for use by the Prime Minister, the Emperor, Empress, and other members of the Imperial Family.

Until March 2019, two Boeing 747-400 aircraft were used. The aircraft were constructed at the Boeing factory at the same time as the United States Air Force One VC-25s, though the US aircraft were built to the 747-200 design, while the Japanese aircraft were built to the more contemporary 747-400 design. Both Japanese aircraft were delivered in 1990.

=== Kenya ===
The government of Kenya currently operates a Fokker 70 officially named Harambee One. It was purchased in 1995 and used for the first time on 26 January 1996 by President Daniel arap Moi. The Fokker is only used for transportation within Africa or for travel to Europe.

=== Kyrgyzstan ===
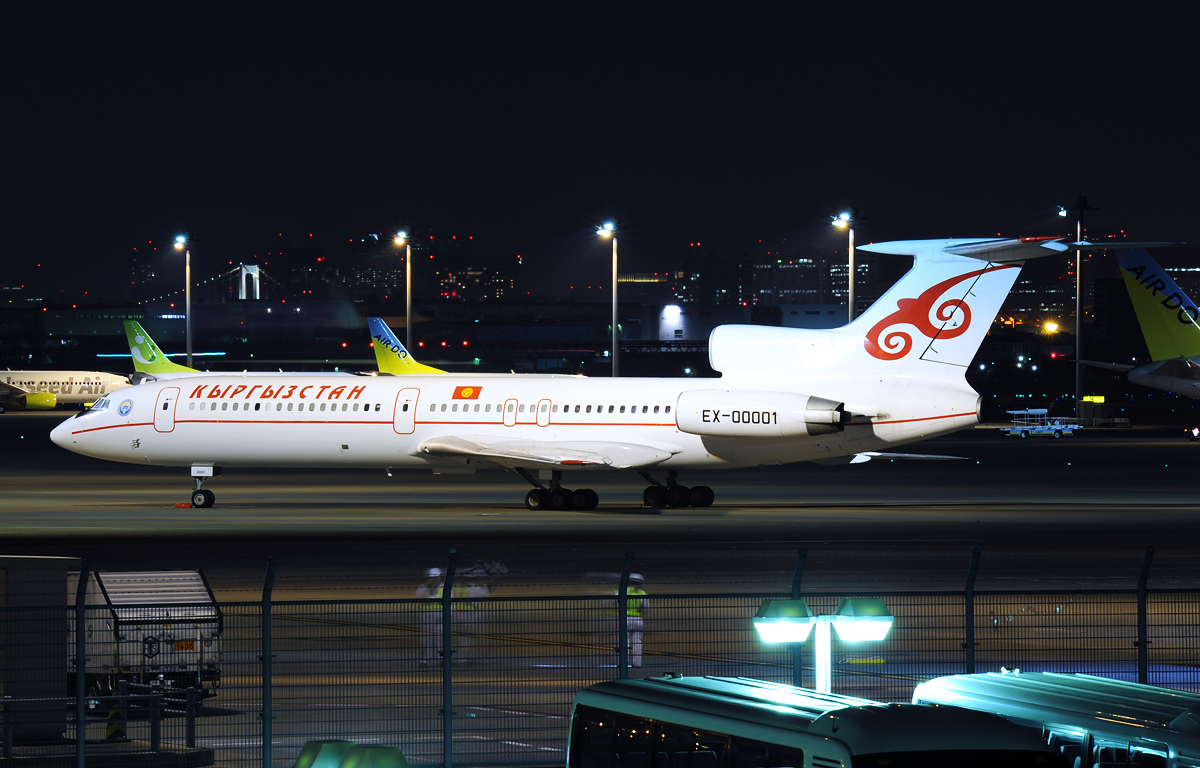
Kyrgyz Tupolev Tu-154 at Haneda Airport

The government of Kyrgyzstan operated a single Tupolev Tu-154M in 2010, which usually flies under four-digit callsigns "KGC" and "LYN". They currently use a Airbus A320 family aircraft, chartered by Air KG.

=== Liberia ===
The government of Liberia mainly uses commercial and corporate jets for travel.

The government used to operate a French-registered Dassault Falcon 900EX for travel.

=== Lithuania ===
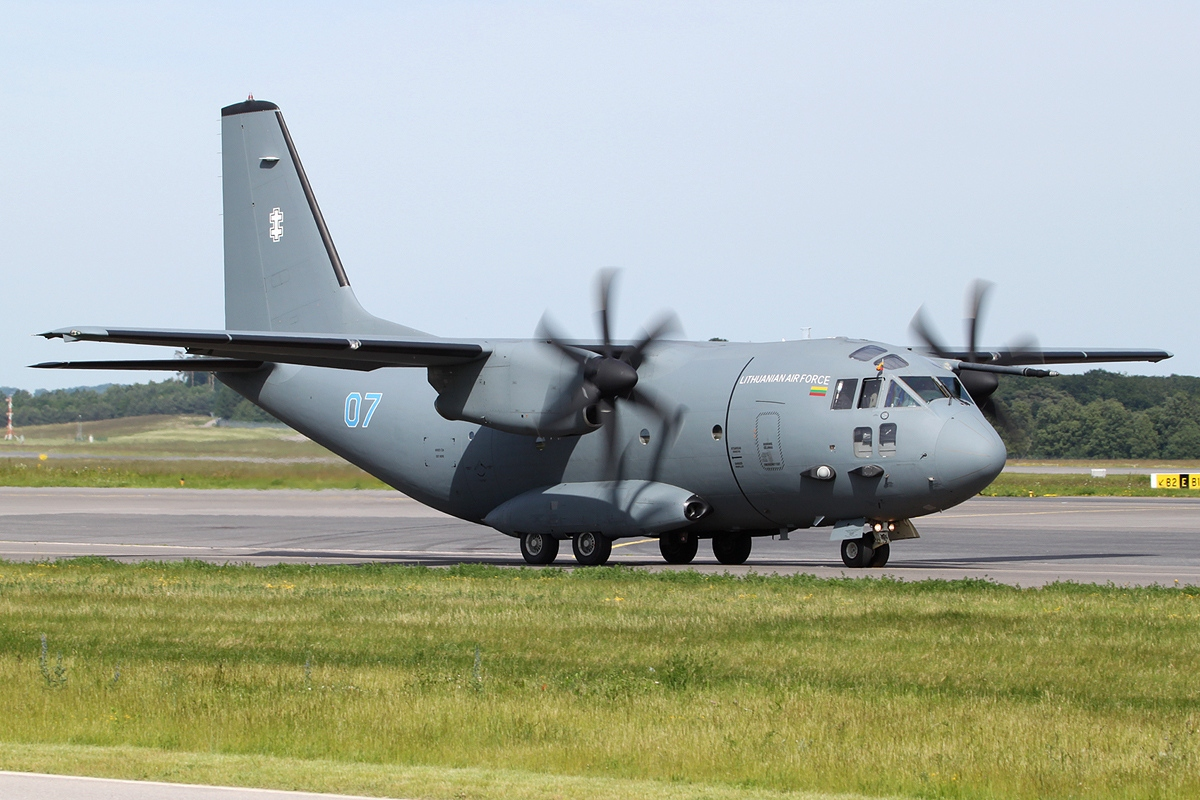
Lithuanian Air Force Alenia C-27J Spartan

During 1994-1998 the Lithuanian government used a Lithuanian Airlines-operated Lockheed Jet Star as a government transportation. Notorious for multiple technical issues and deemed too small for larger delegations it was sold in 1998.

Since late the 1990's the president and the government of Lithuania use one of the three Alenia C-27J Spartans of the Lithuanian Air Force in a passenger configuration.

=== Luxembourg ===
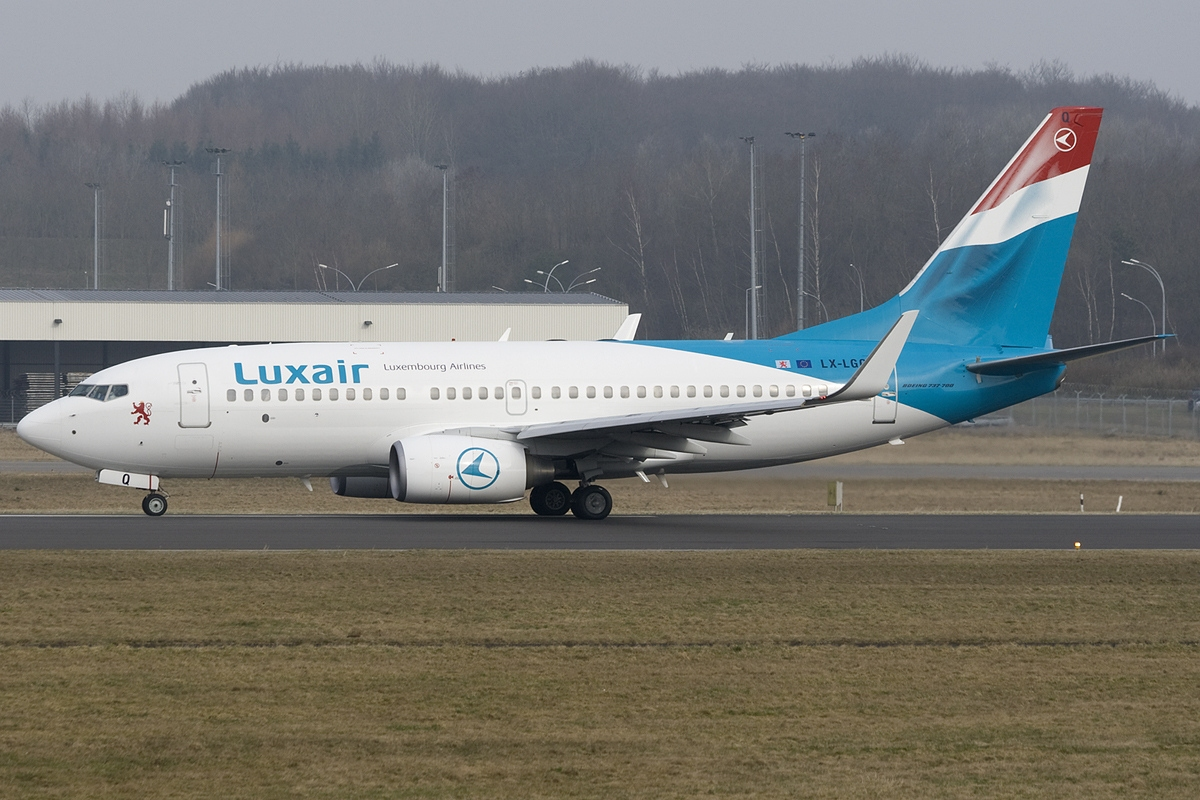
Luxair's Boeing 737-700

A private Cessna 550 Citation II, a Learjet 35A or even a 737-700 chartered from the flag carrier Luxair are sometimes used for governmental flights. Other than that, commercial aircraft is used, for example, former Prime Minister Xavier Bettel used a Vietnam Airlines plane to travel to Vietnam for a working visit.

=== Madagascar ===
The government of Madagascar operated a Boeing 737-300 in 2015.

=== Malaysia ===
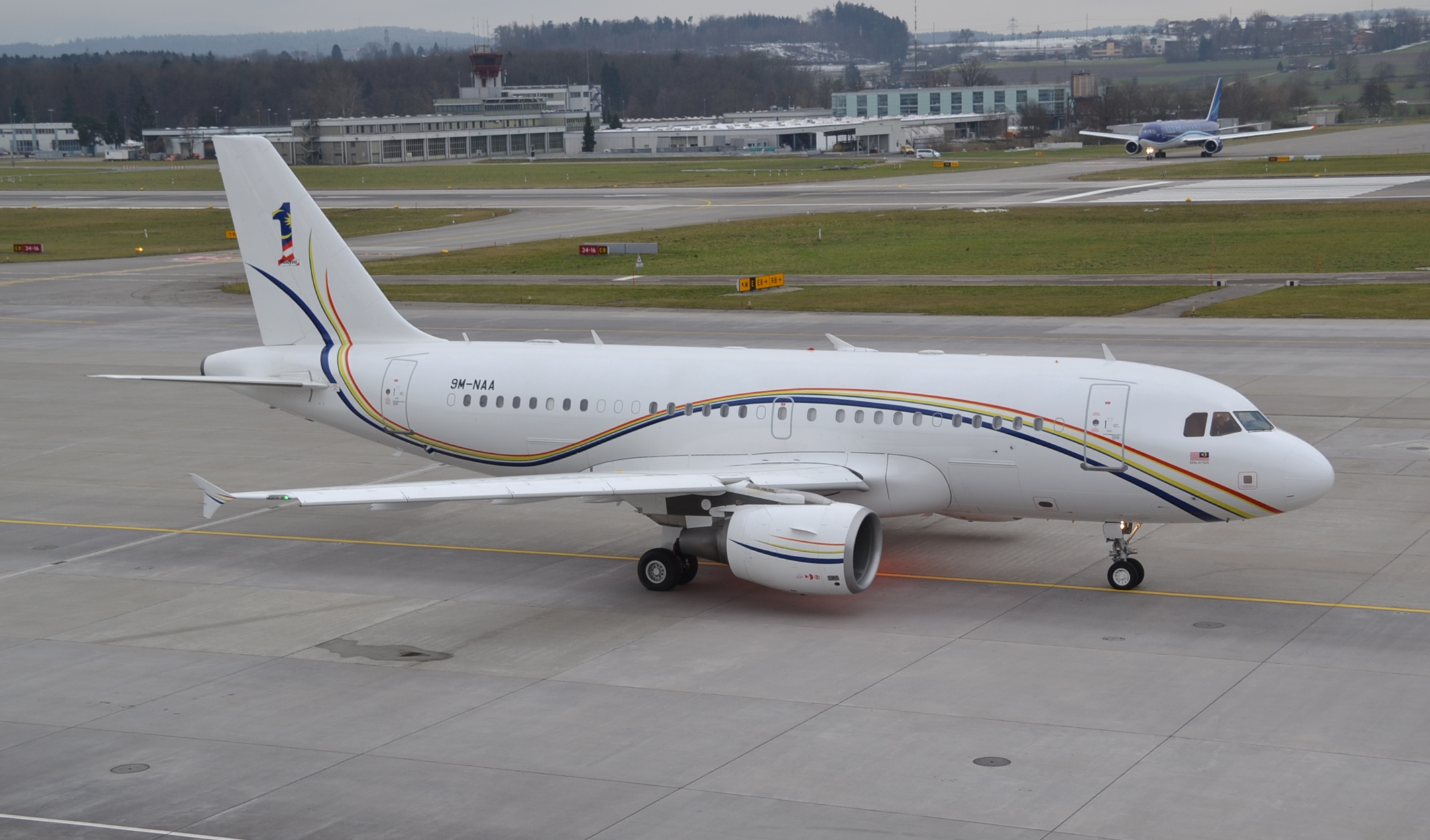
Malaysia Airbus ACJ319

Malaysia's Prime Minister and Yang di-Pertuan Agong (Ruling Monarch) travel aboard aircraft operated by the Royal Malaysian Air Force. For this purpose, an Airbus ACJ319 named Perdana 1 was purchased in 2007, and an Airbus ACJ320 named Perdana 2 in 2015. Other fixed wing aircraft in use include a Dassault Falcon 900, a Bombardier Global Express BD-700, and a Boeing 737-800 BBJ. For long trips, the Malaysian PM also flies on a special chartered Malaysia Airlines Airbus A350-900 in 'Negaraku livery'.

=== Maldives ===
The government uses commercial aircraft for travel. In addition, the President has been known to use aircraft from the Saudi Government for religious trips.

=== Mali ===
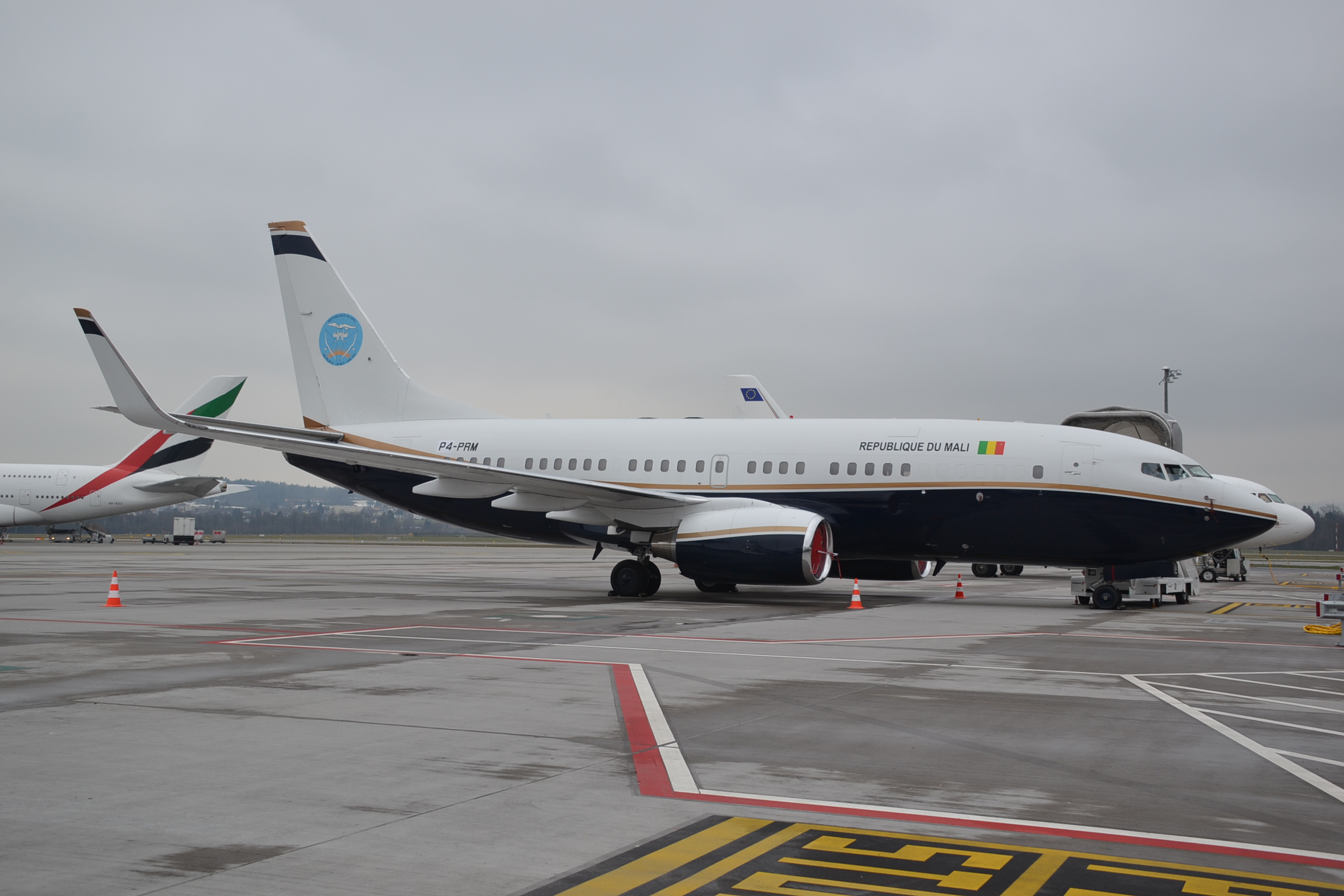
Republic of Mali Boeing 737-700

The government of Mali operated a Boeing 737-700/BBJ.

=== Malta ===
The government uses a Learjet 60 for travel.

=== Mauritania ===
The Mauritanian Air Force currently operates a Boeing 737 BBJ in a white-livery for use by the President and government officials, registered under the callsign 5T-ONE.

=== Mexico ===
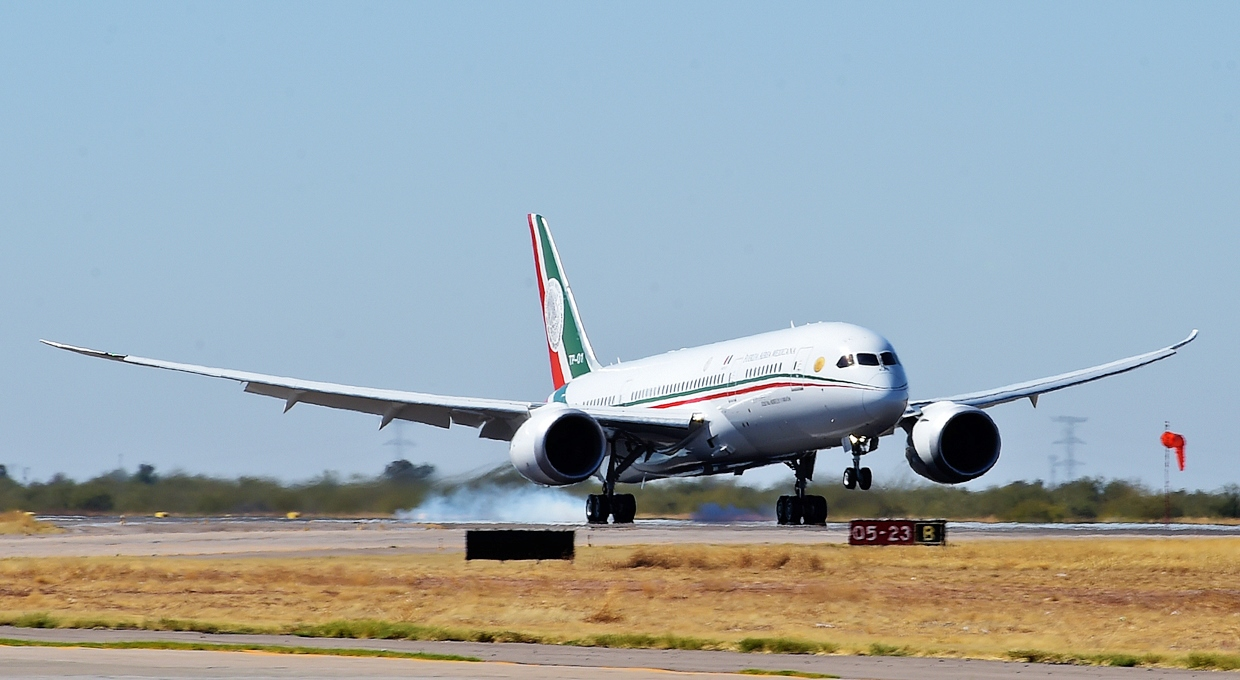
Mexican Air Force Boeing 787-8

Former president Andrés Manuel López Obrador strictly flew commercial flights where possible. His predecessors maintained a large fleet of aircraft for VIP use, including a Boeing 787 which was acquired under the Presidency of Felipe Calderón, and first and last used by president Enrique Peña Nieto in 2016. López Obrador has since sold most of these aircraft or stored them; in particular, the Boeing 787 was sold to the Government of Tajikistan in 2022.

=== Moldova ===
In the 1990s, the Moldovan government operated a single Tupolev TU-134 for use by the government. In the 2000s, it was retired, and the Moldovan government leased an Air Moldova Yakovlev Yak-40 for VIP use. That was retired too, and the most recent aircraft used by the President or Prime Minister is an Air Moldova Airbus A320 family jet, which uses an Air Moldova callsign. President Maia Sandu was spotted taking low-cost carrier Wizz Air on a flight to Brussels. En route to Armenia for the 8th European Political Community Summit, she accompanied Nicușor Dan on the Romanian Air Corps Alenia C-27J Spartan showing a unionist approach to their alliance.

=== Nepal ===
The present President of Nepal, Prime Minister of Nepal, and other senior government officials travel on regular scheduled commercial flights or chartered flights by either Nepal Airlines or Himalaya Airlines. There is no plane used specifically for VIP operations.

=== Netherlands ===
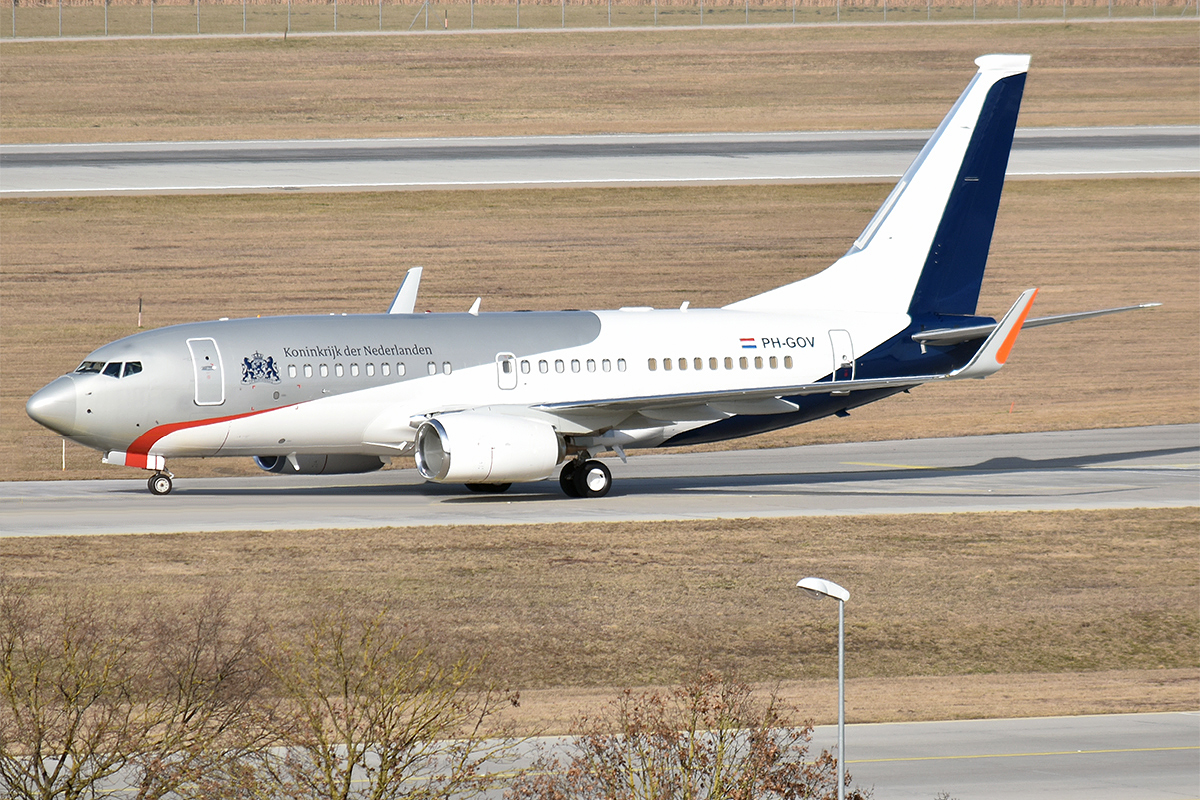
The 737-700BBJ of the Dutch government

The government of the Netherlands operates as Dutch government aircraft a Boeing 737 BBJ as a means of transport for the Dutch Royal family and government officials such as the prime minister and other ministers. It is used not only to attend international conferences but also for private trips by King Willem-Alexander (who is a licensed commercial pilot type rated to fly the 737) and Queen Maxima. This aircraft was introduced in 2019 at a cost of €89 million. A Fokker 70 had been operated, but was retired in May 2017 in line with the withdrawal of the Fokker 70 from the fleet of KLM Cityhopper which had maintained the aircraft.

=== New Zealand ===
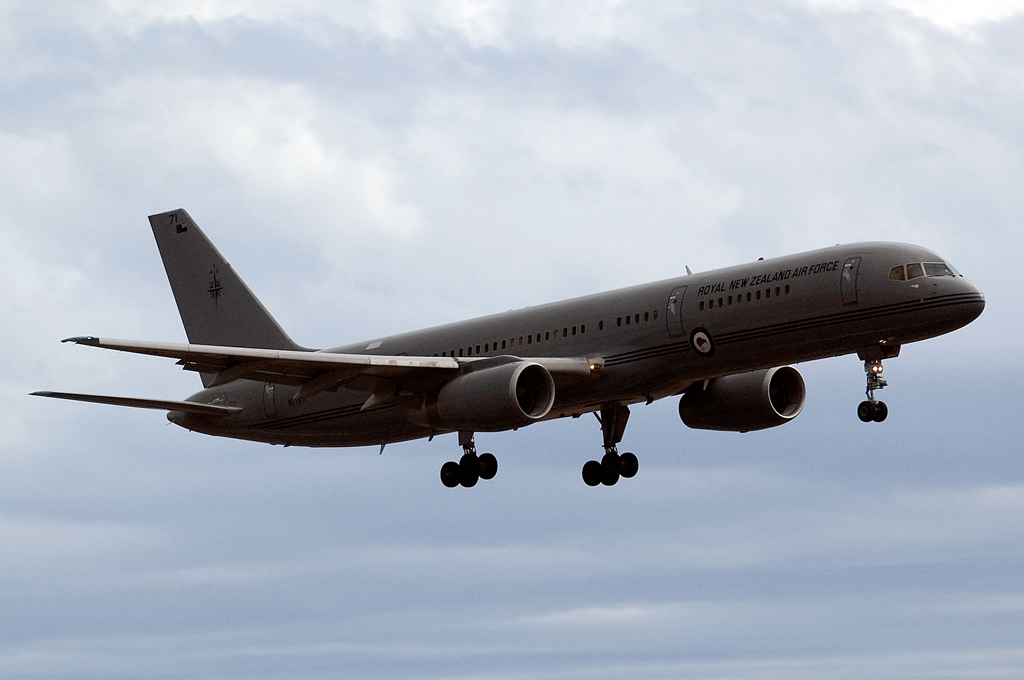
Royal New Zealand Air Force Boeing 757-2K2

For the majority of travel the Prime Minister of New Zealand uses commercial flights however, the Royal New Zealand Air Force operates a fleet of two Boeing 757-2K2's operated by No. 40 Squadron sometimes used by the Prime Minister for diplomatic missions. The aircraft are predominantly used to carry personnel, equipment and to facilitate other ministerial travel. VIP travel only makes up around 12 to 15 percent of the aircraft's use. The Boeing 757 aircraft were purchased in 2003 and underwent modifications to add an upper deck cargo door in 2007. In 2024, the aircraft came under scrutiny after one of the Boeing 757's was grounded in Papua New Guinea enroute to a summit in Tokyo with the Prime Minister of Japan due to a fuse issue.

On 21 August 2025, the New Zealand Government announced the replacement of the two Boeing 757s with two Airbus A321XLR. The aircraft will feature a similar grey livery with a prominent kiwi roundel. The aircraft will operate with a normal crew of seven, however will be able to operate a crew between 3 and 15. The Airbus A321XLR aircraft are expected to enter service in 2028 and will cost NZ$620 million.

=== North Korea ===
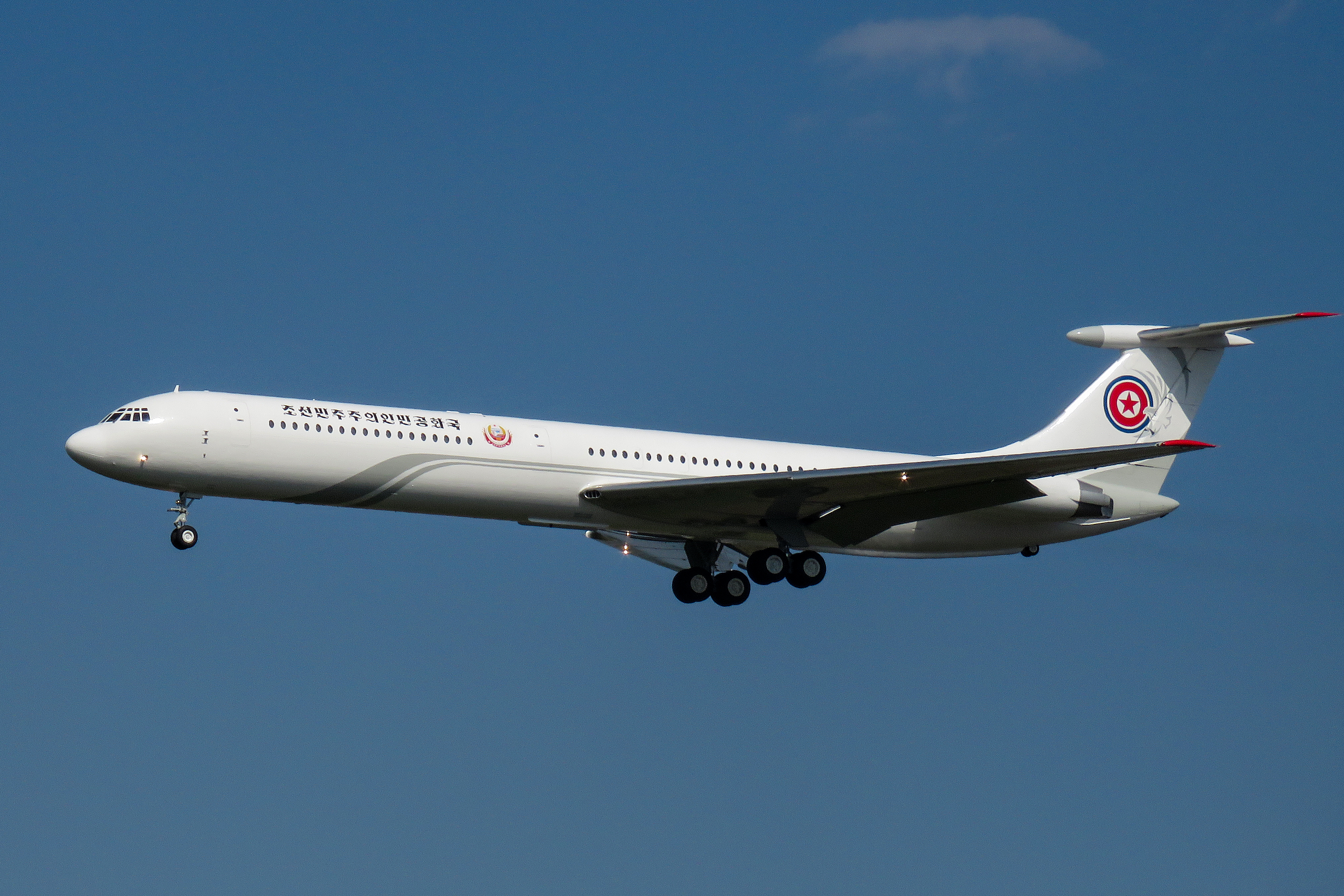
Air Koryo's Ilyushin Il-62M for official flights

North Korean leader Kim Jong-un travels overseas on one of two VIP configured Ilyushin Il-62M aircraft of the Korean People's Army Air Force operated by Air Koryo crew, known as Chammae-1. Kim Jong-un's private aircraft is known as Goshawk-1.

=== Pakistan ===
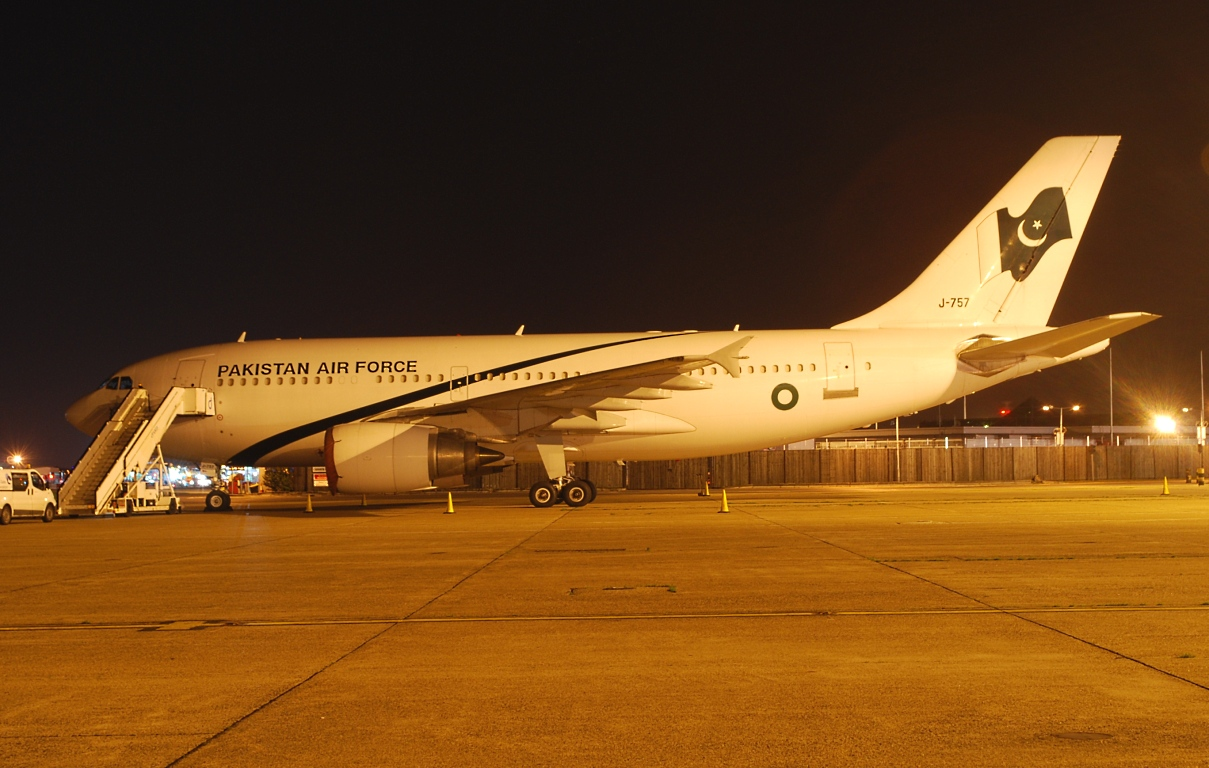
Airbus A310-300 (PakAF) J-757

The history of VIP transport in Pakistan dates back to August 1947, when an ex-British Imperial Air Force Vickers VC.1 Viking was acquired to serve as the official transport aircraft for the Governor-General of Pakistan. This aircraft is considered as the first to use the call sign reserved for an aircraft flying Pakistan's head of state or head of government, 'PAKISTAN ONE'. Governor-Generals Muhammad Ali Jinnah, and Khawaja Nazimuddin used the aircraft until 1955, when it was retired. It remained parked at Karachi's Mauripur Airbase and then at a Pakistan Air Force Base in Peshawar. In 1997, the aircraft was disassembled and transported to Karachi and put up for display at the Pakistan Air Force Museum.

In the 1960s and 70s, Presidents Muhammad Ayub Khan, Yahya Khan and Zulfiqar Ali Bhutto used Boeing 707 jetliners of the national flag carrier, Pakistan International Airlines. In the 1980s, President Muhammad Zia-ul-Haq used a Lockheed C-130B Hercules. In the 1990s, Prime Ministers Nawaz Sharif and Benazir Bhutto used a Boeing 737 for their official trips which was maintained by the Pakistani Government. During the late 1990s, Sharif's government bought a Boeing 737-300 for official use. Initially its role was rotated between serving as a regular commercial aircraft for Pakistan International Airlines and as a VIP transport for the government. However, following a military coup in 1999 the aircraft was permanently transferred to Pakistan International Airlines. The President and Prime Minister then resorted to using two of the airline's Airbus A310s for official visits, while rare trips were done on regular commercial flights of the airline. In 2007 the Qatari government gifted an Airbus A310-300 of the Qatar Amiri Flight to Pakistan, which was operated for the Pakistan Air Force by Pakistan International Airlines.

Since 2025 one Airbus A319 (A-1102), two Gulfstream IV and four AW 139 helicopters are used by the President and Prime Minister for air travel. The No. 12 VIP Squadron, of the Pakistan Air Force, is the operator and transports the President and the Prime Minister with the call sign of PAKISTAN ONE.

=== Panama ===
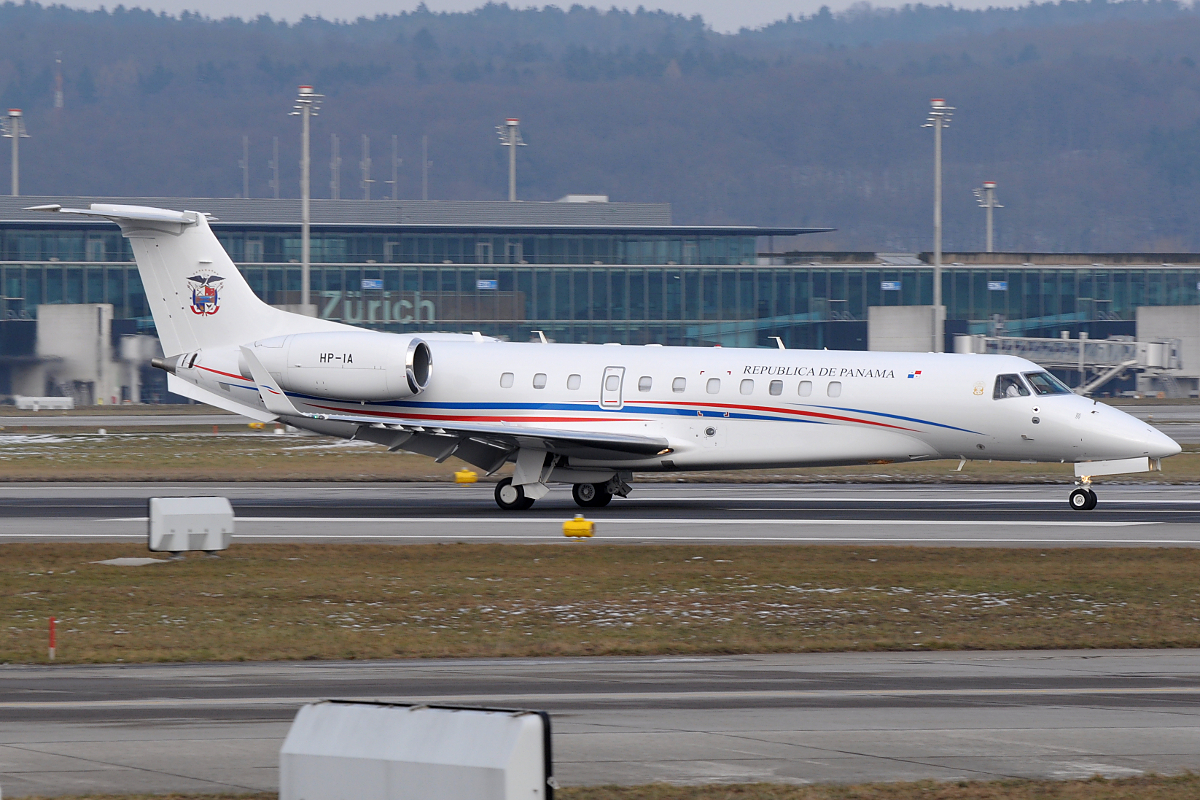
Panama presidential aircraft Embraer ERJ-135BJ Legacy 600.

The government of Panama operated two aircraft for transportation of the President of Panama: one Embraer ERJ 145 for overseas flights, which replaced a Gulfstream II, and one Sikorsky S-76 for domestic flights. The National Aeronaval Service is responsible for the maintenance and operation of the aircraft although it does not belong to them.

=== Paraguay ===
In 2019, a Cessna Citation Sovereign donated by the Taiwanese government was placed in service with the Paraguayan Air Force (FAP) as a VIP and presidential aircraft. Alfredo Stroessner, head of state from 1954 to 1989, used a de Havilland Dove and later a de Havilland Canada DHC-6 Twin Otter as a VIP transport; although the Twin Otter remained in the FAP inventory, subsequent presidents instead used two privately owned aircraft, a Beechcraft King Air 350 and a Boeing 707, until the 707 was retired without replacement in 1998.

=== Peru ===
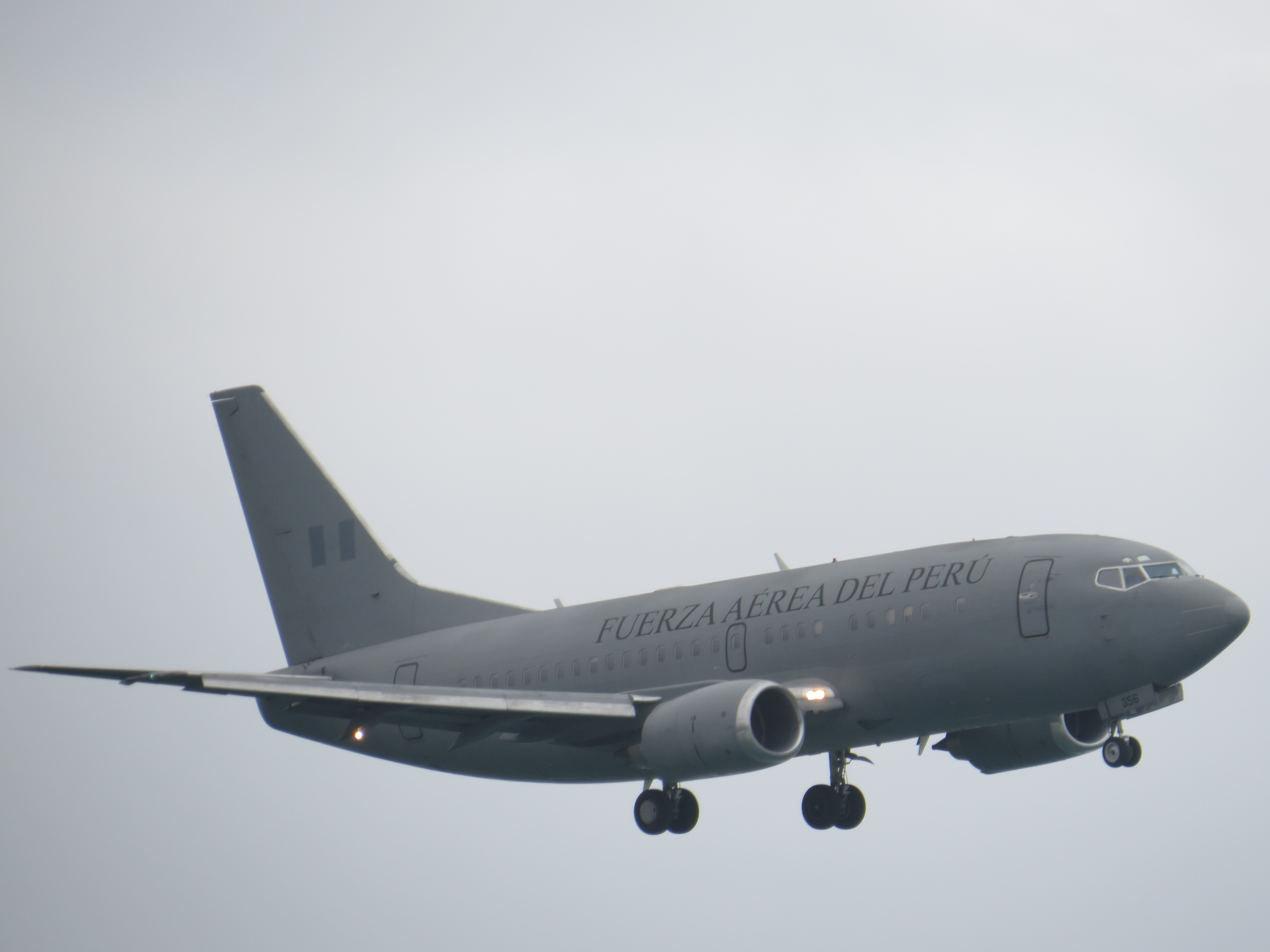
Boeing 737 of Republic of Peru

The official aircraft of the President of Peru is a Boeing 737-500 of the Peruvian Air Force, acquired in 1995 during Alberto Fujimori's presidency. President Pedro Castillo promised to sell the aircraft and fly commercial, use the money for health and education for the poor, as well as considering banning government officials from flying first class.

=== Philippines ===
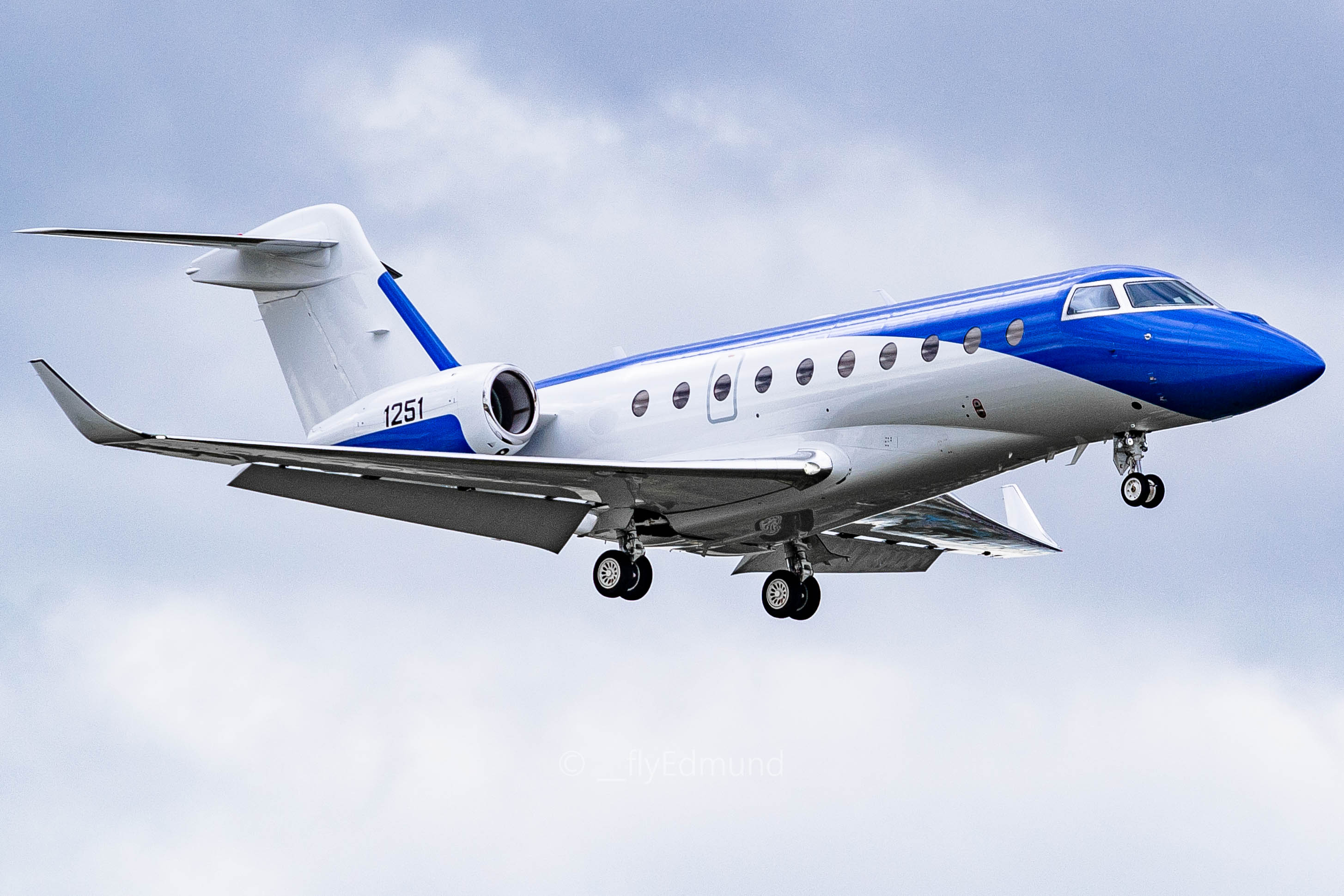
Gulfstream G280 of the Philippine Air Force, seen landing at Ninoy Aquino International Airport.

In 2024 the fleet included: seven Bell 412 helicopters. In October 2019, the government purchased an Airbus C-295 delivered in April 2019 and a Gulfstream G280 which cost 2 billion pesos delivered in September 2020 for use by the President and other senior officials respectively. A Hawker 800XP business jet was donated by San Miguel Corporation in May 2022.

For trips outside of the Philippines, the President uses a Learjet 60, Challenger 850 Gulfstream G550, Gulfstream G650ER or charters appropriate aircraft from Philippine Airlines.

==== Former presidential aircraft ====
Toward the end of the Marcos administration, the squadron of presidential aircraft consisted of airliners such as one Boeing 707, one BAC One-Eleven, one NAMC YS-11, and one Fokker F28 Fellowship, along with helicopters such as one Sikorsky S-62A, two Bell UH-1N, one Aérospatiale SA 330 Puma, and two Sikorsky S-70AS. President Corazon Aquino used some of these aircraft and sold others as an austerity measure. Subsequent administrations used one Fokker F28, which was primarily used for the president's domestic trips and was also called Kalayaan (Filipino for "Freedom") One when the president was on board, and one Fokker F27 aircraft, which was subsequently retired by the Duterte administration as they acquired new aircraft during the COVID-19 pandemic.

=== Poland ===
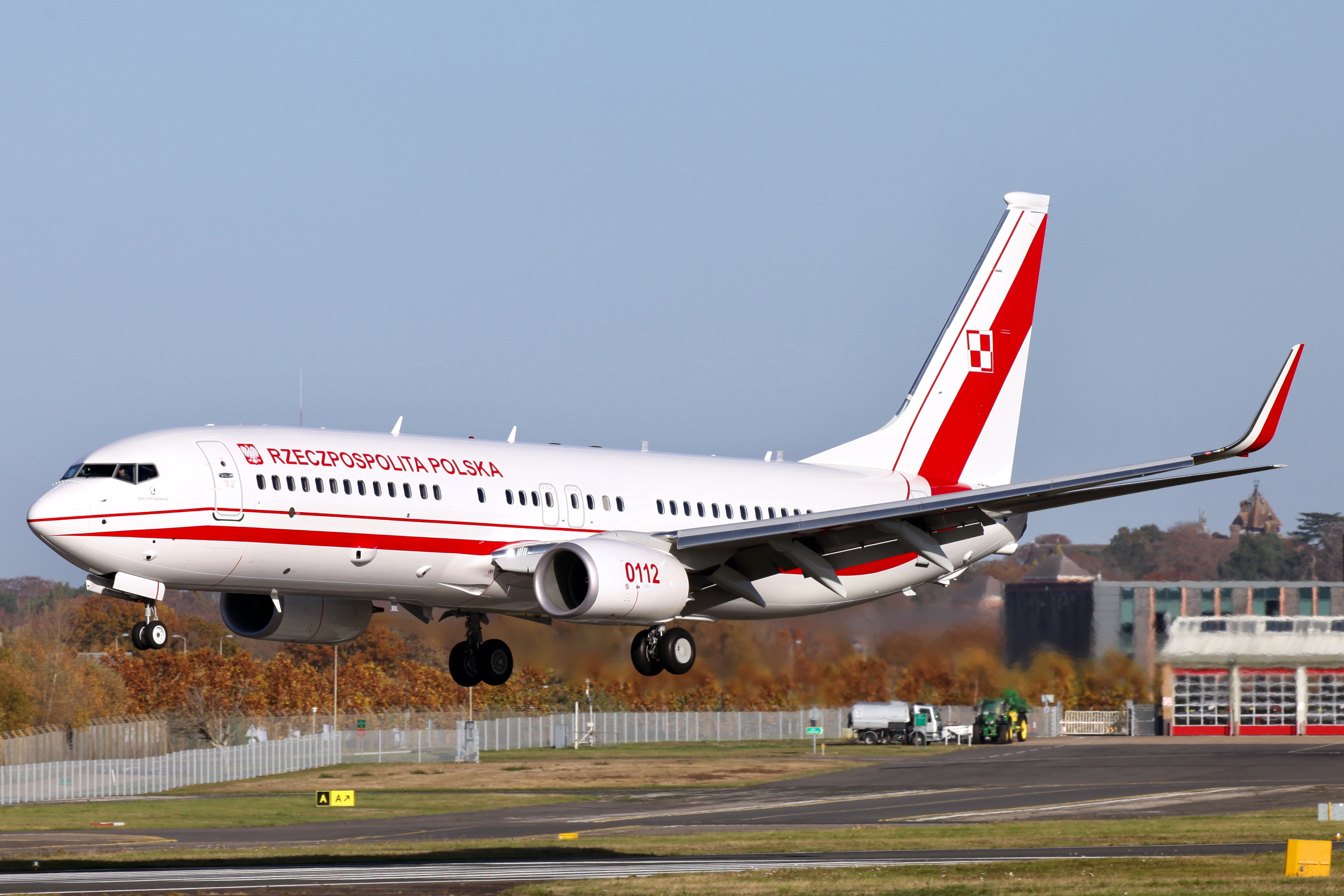
Polish Air Force Boeing BBJ2 Ignacy Jan Paderewski

The Polish Air Force operates a dedicated fleet of five jet aircraft intended for use by the highest-ranking Polish government officials ("najważniejsze osoby w państwie"), including the president, the prime minister, the Marshal of the Sejm, and the Marshal of the Senate. The aircraft are operated and maintained by the Polish Air Force 1st Airlift Air Base.

As of 2025, the government fleet includes two Boeing BBJ2 in custom configuration for 65 passengers, featuring a VIP suite with separate work and rest areas, a business class section, an economy class section, a small medical suite with lifesaving equipment, secure communication systems as well as anti-missile defense systems; one reconfigured Boeing 737-800NG with 132 seats that can be also used by the military and for casualty evacuation; and two Gulfstream G550 in VIP configuration, each capable of carrying 16 passengers. The 1st Airlift Air Base also operates multiple PZL W-3A Sokół and Mil Mi-8 helicopters.

=== Saudi Arabia ===
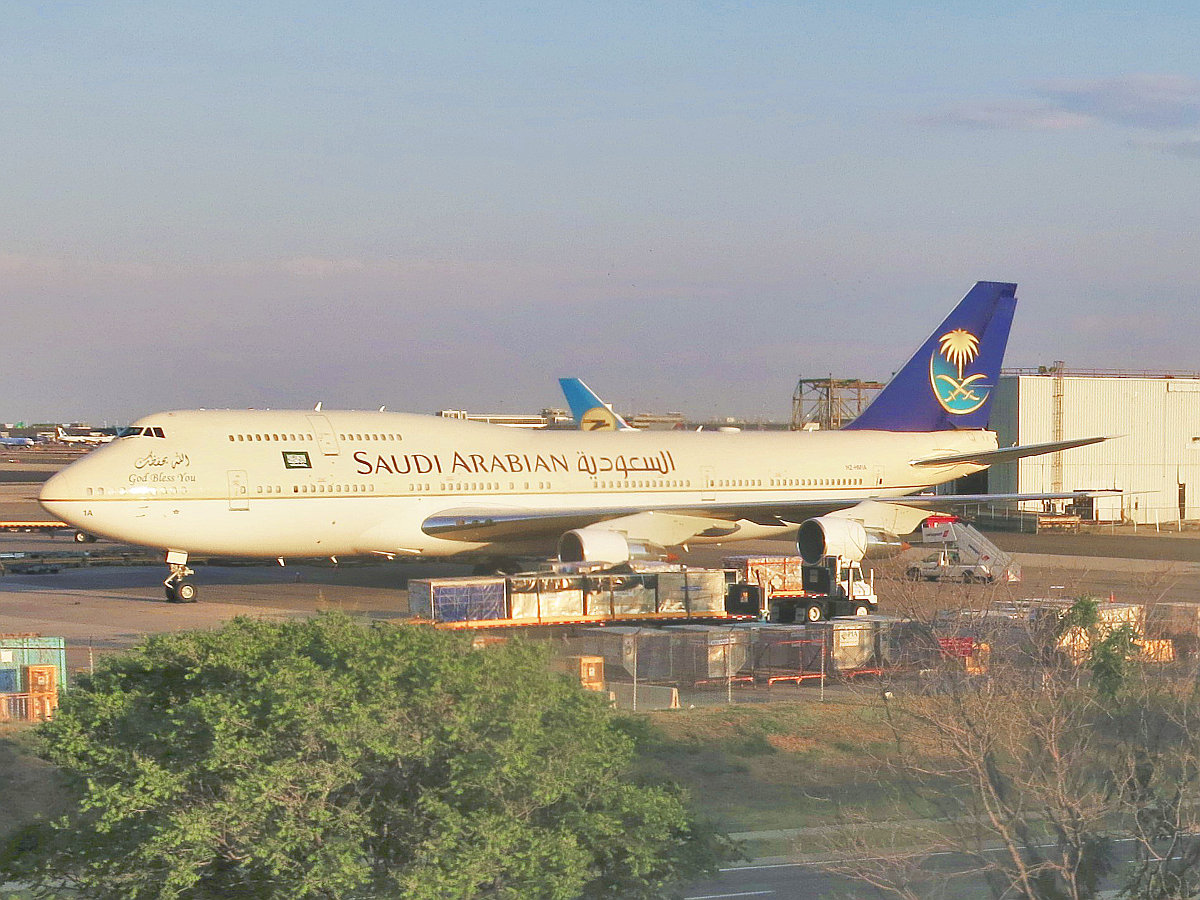
Saudi Arabian Government Boeing 747-300 parked at JFK Airport in New York City.

The Saudi royal family and government have multiple fleets of aircraft at their disposal. The Saudi Arabian Government operates a Boeing 747-300, a Boeing 747-400, a Boeing 757-200, an Airbus A340-200 and a Boeing 777-300ER for use by the King of Saudi Arabia.

=== Senegal ===
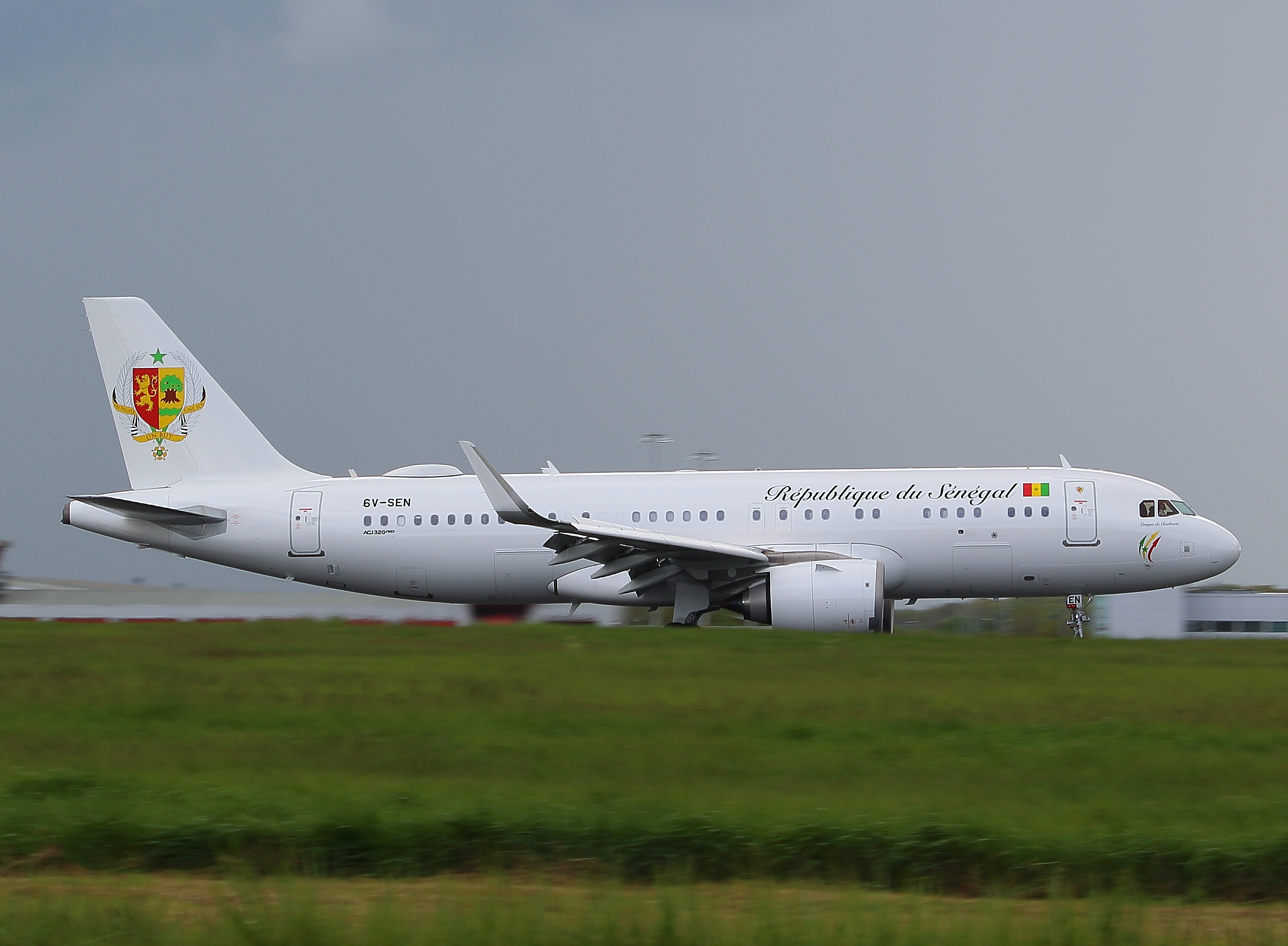
Senegalese Presidential Jet Airbus A320neo

The government of Senegal currently operates a A320neo officially named Langue de Barbarie.

=== Serbia ===
The Government Aviation Service (Avio-služba Vlade) is responsible for long-distance air travel of the President of the Republic and the Prime Minister. It operates a three-plane fleet, consisting of Dassault Falcon 6X, Embraer Legacy 600, and Learjet 31. The Police Helicopter Unit (Helikopterska jedinica) is responsible for short-distance air travel of the President, Prime Minister, and Minister of Internal Affairs, for which purpose it uses two helicopters: an Airbus H215 and a Sikorsky S-76.

=== Seychelles ===
The government uses commercial or private aircraft for travel. In particular, during a state visit to Mauritius in November 2020, President Wavel Ramkalawan used a Beechcraft 1900D from IDC Aviation (Islands Development Company).

=== Sierra Leone ===
The government uses commercial or private aircraft for travel. They are also known to use VIP aircraft from other countries for travel.

=== Singapore ===
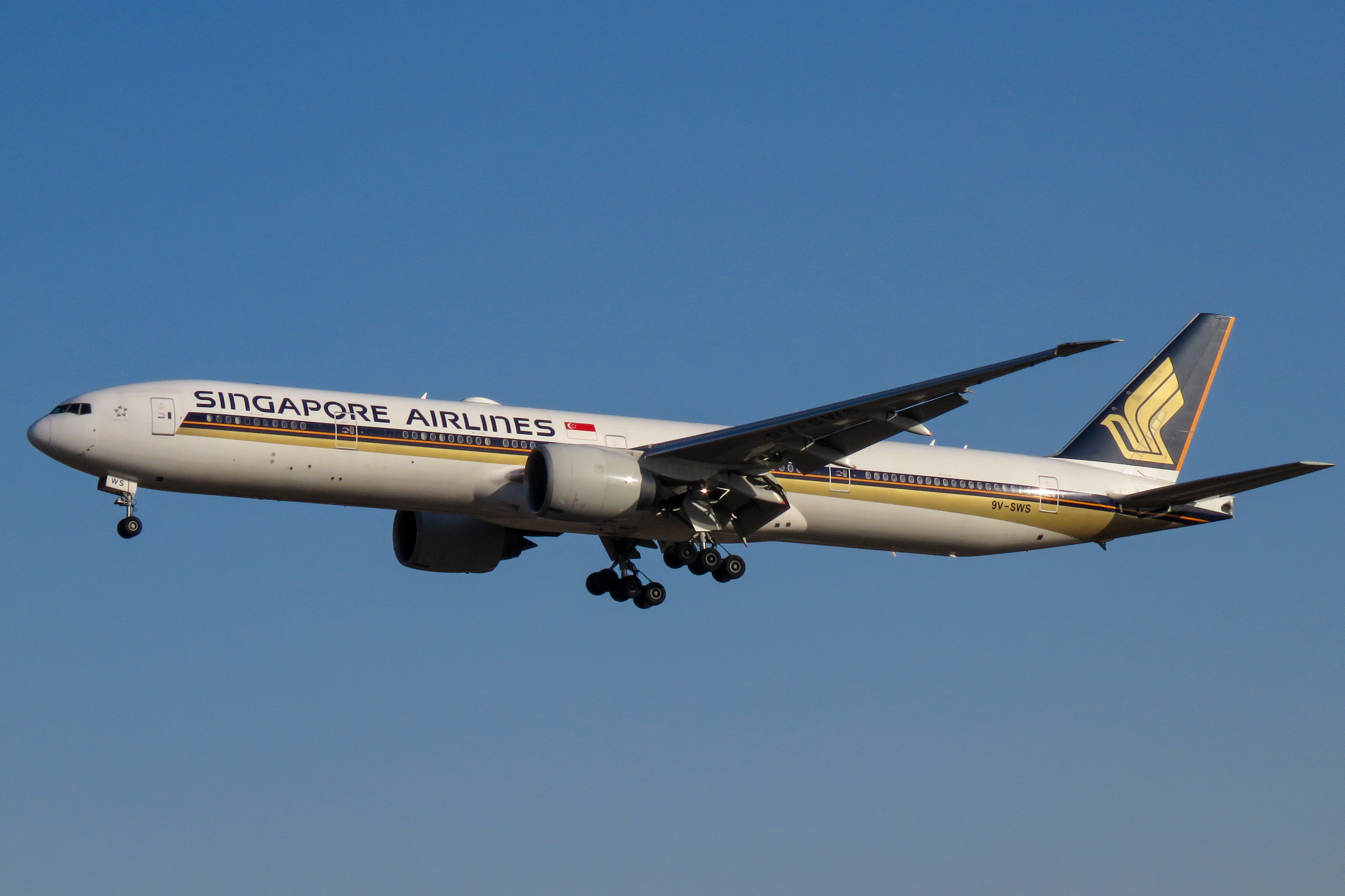
A Singapore Airlines Boeing 777-300ER

The President, Prime Minister of Singapore and government officials typically travel on regular scheduled commercial or charter flights, mostly operated by Singapore's flag carrier, Singapore Airlines, Scoot or other commercial airlines depending on the location.

However, at the APEC Philippines 2015 summit, the then Prime Minister travelled on an Australian-registered Gulfstream G550, operated by Pacific Flight Services which is a subsidiary of ST Engineering.

During the APEC South Korea 2025 summit, Prime Minister Lawrence Wong travelled on a Republic of Singapore Air Force Airbus A330 MRTT, operating under the callsign SAF10, departing Singapore Changi Air Base (East) and landing at Gimhae Air Base in Busan.

=== Somalia ===
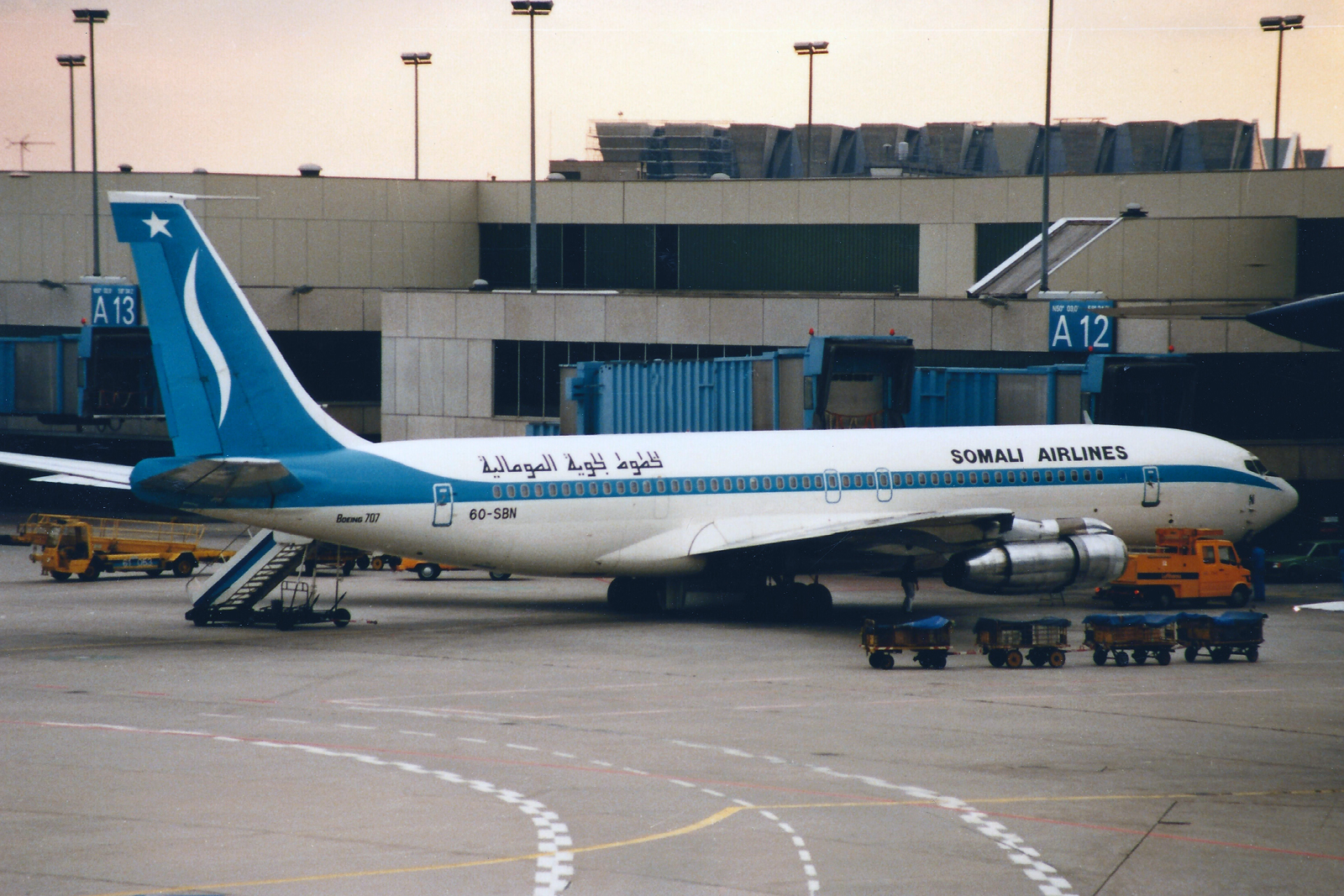
A Somali Airlines Boeing 707-338C at Frankfurt, West Germany in 1985. The air transport of the President would be visually identical.

The government of Somalia under Presidents Aden Adde and Abdirashid Shermarke traveled on a Douglas DC-3.

The government of Somalia under President Siad Barre and government officials often traveled on an Ilyushin Il-62 until the mid-1970s and then on a Boeing 707. The aircraft would be in the livery of the state-owned and flag carrier airline at the time, Somali Airlines.

=== South Africa ===
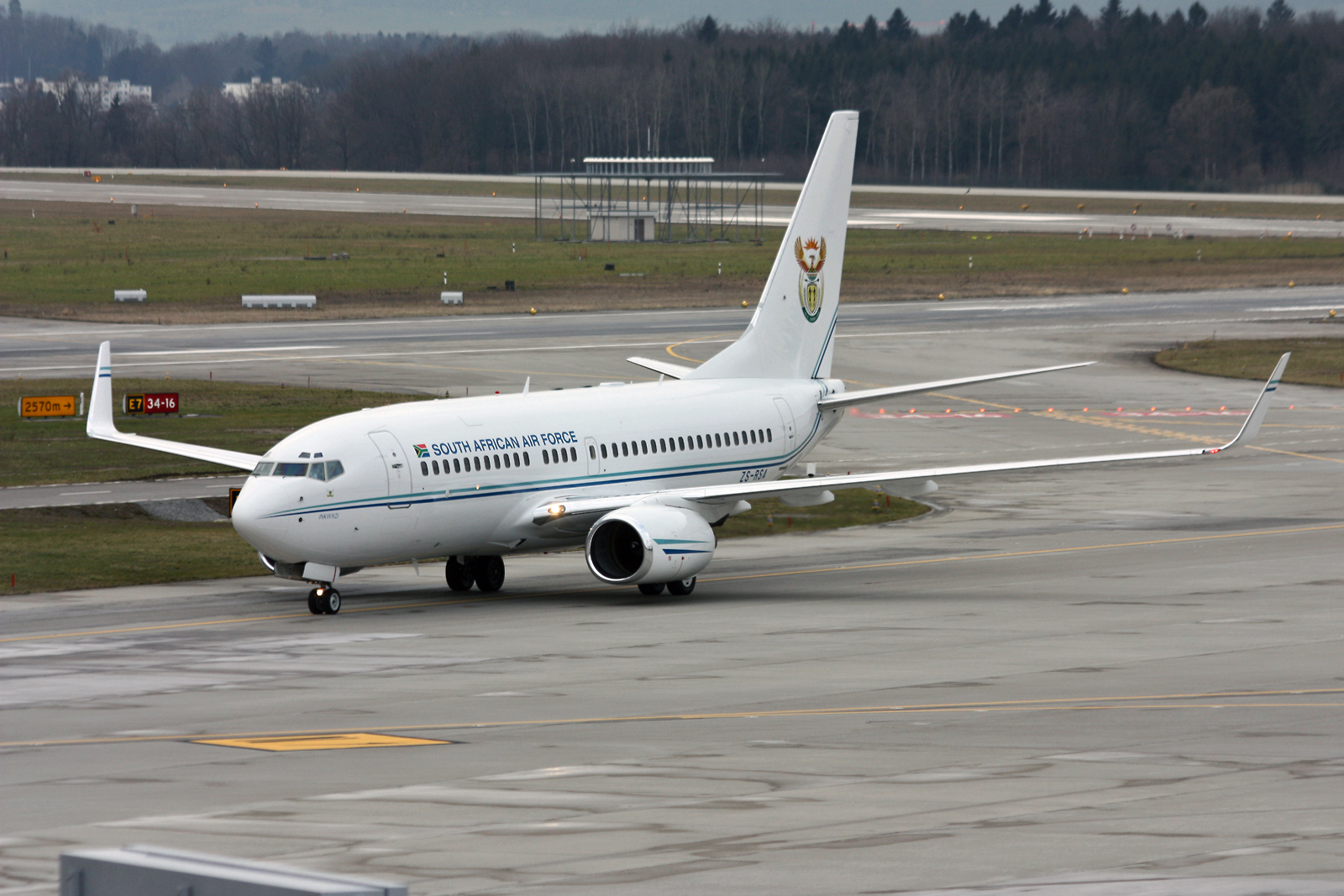
South African Air Force Boeing 737-7ED BBJ

In 2015, President Jacob Zuma asked Armscor to procure a business jet capable of carrying at least 30 passengers and traveling long distances, and much larger than the current presidential jet (Inkwazi). Models being considered included the Boeing 777, Boeing 787 and Airbus A340.

=== South Korea ===
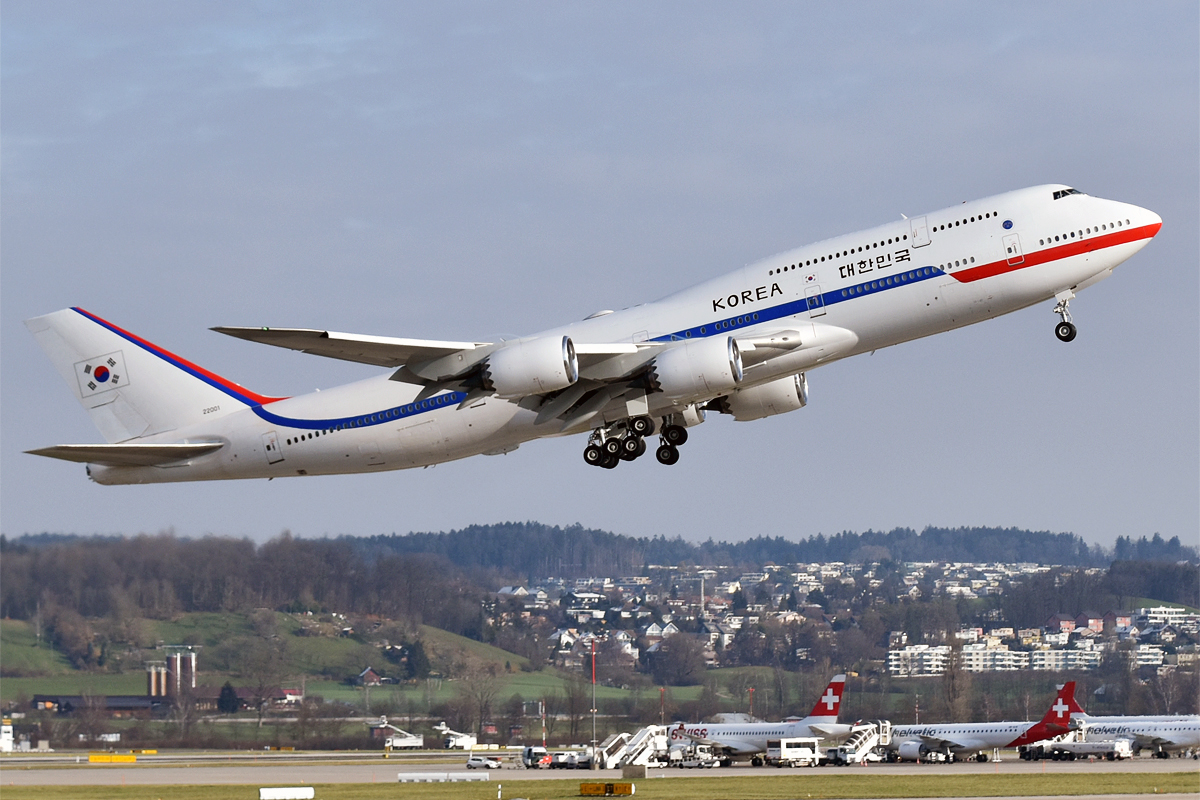
Government of South Korea, 22-001, Boeing 747-8B5

Since January 2022, a Boeing 747-8I leased from Korean Air to the Republic of Korea Air Force conducts official international travels by the President of South Korea. Known by the call sign "Code One" (KAF001), the aircraft is based in Seoul Air Base and operational support is provided by Korean Air. From April 2010 to January 2022, a dedicated Boeing 747-400 leased from Korean Air served in this role. Originally even pilots and flight attendants were from Korean Air, though they were planned to be replaced by Air Force personnel.

=== Spain ===
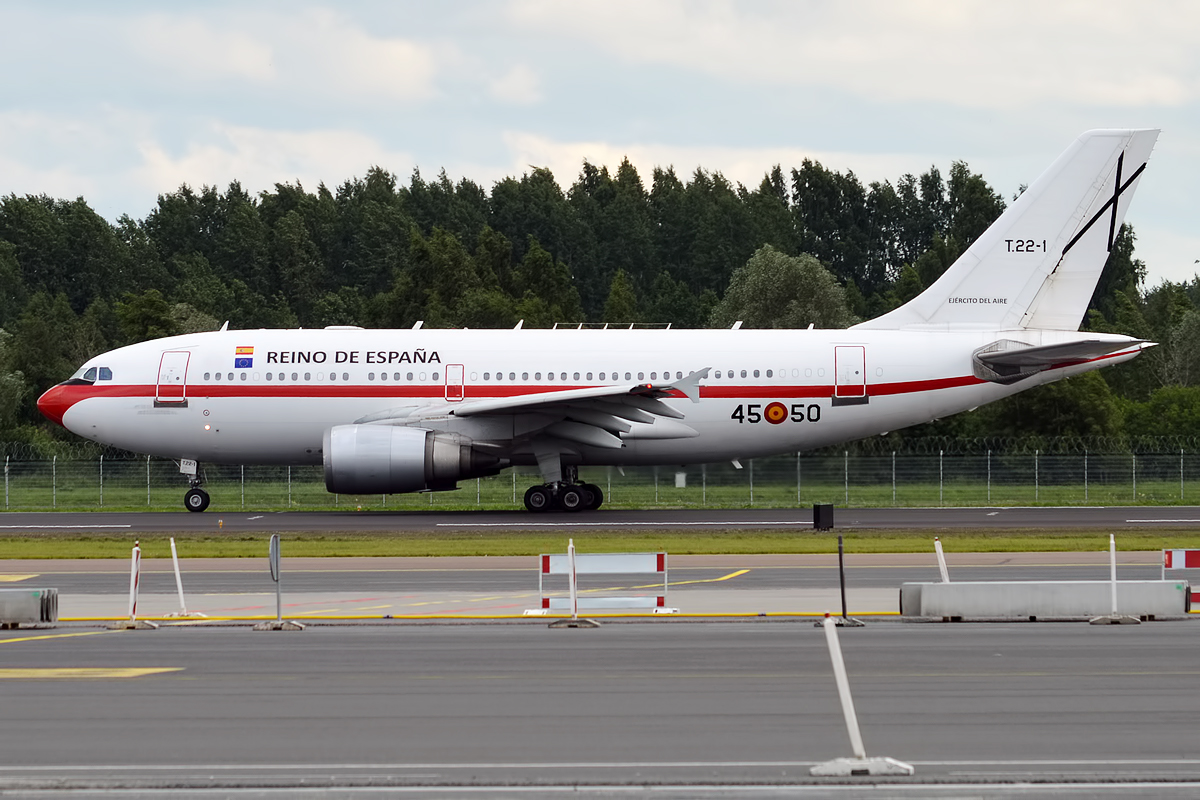
Airbus A310-300 of the Spanish Air and Space Force

The Spanish Air and Space Force operates two customized Airbus A310s and five Falcon 900s, it also operates four AS332 Super Puma and two AS532UL Cougar for transportation of the King, his family, the Prime Minister and high-ranking government officials. These transportation services are provided by the 45th Group of the Air Force, based in Torrejón Air Base, 24 kilometers (15 mi) from Madrid and 402 Squadron of the 48th Wing, located at Cuatro Vientos Air Base respectively.

On 21 October 2025, the Council of Ministers approved a €240 million program to acquire six Airbus Helicopters H175 to replace the Cougars and Super Pumas of the 48th Wing.

=== Sudan ===
Two Mil Mi-17 VIP helicopters are used for domestic air transport.

=== Sweden ===
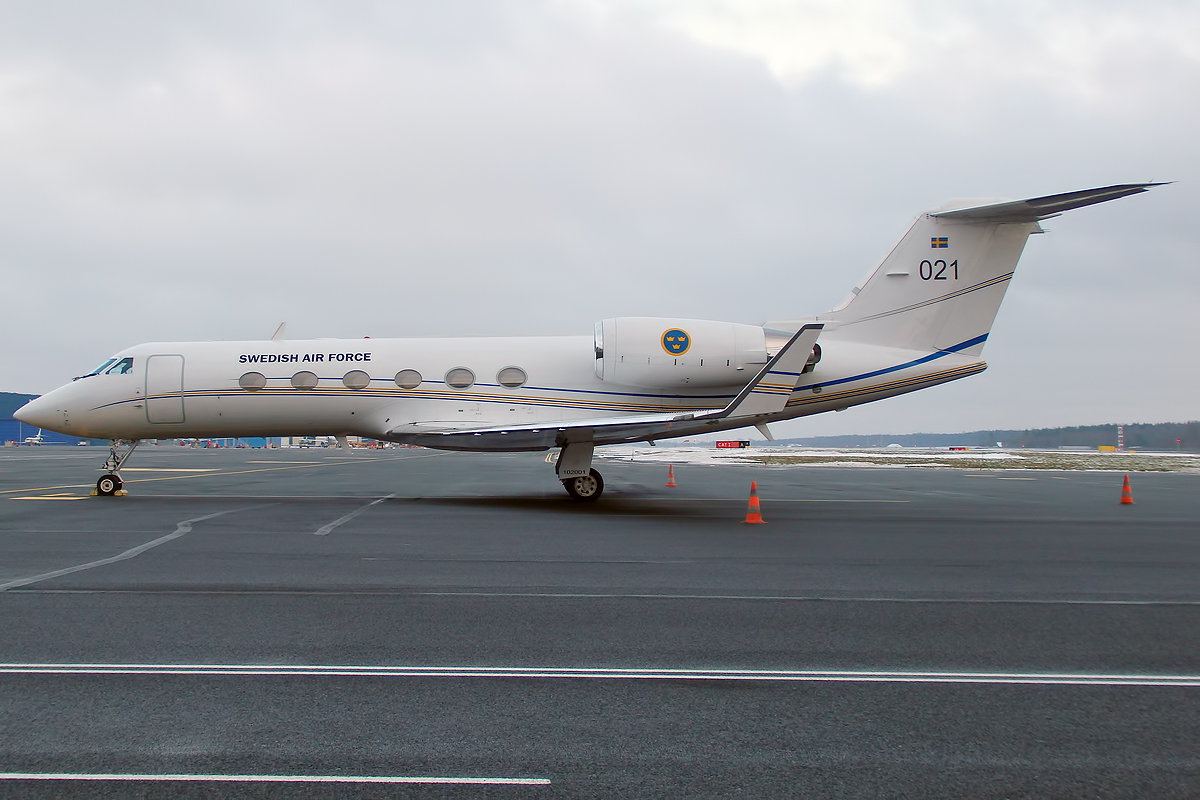
Gulfstream IV of the Swedish Air Force State Flight.

The Swedish Air Force operates the State Flight (Swedish: Statsflyget), since 2016 based on Stockholm Arlanda Airport in Sigtuna Municipality. It forms part of the Transport and Special Flying Unit (TSFE, Swedish: Transport och Specialflygenheten), which in its turn is a part of the Skaraborg Wing (F 7). Since 1 june 2026 it operates two Bombardier Global 6500.. Earlier it operated one Gulfstream IV aircraft and one Gulfstream G550 in the VIP transport role.

The use of the State Flight is regulated in the State Flight Ordinance (Swedish: Statsflygsförordningen) issued by the Government of Sweden.

=== Switzerland ===
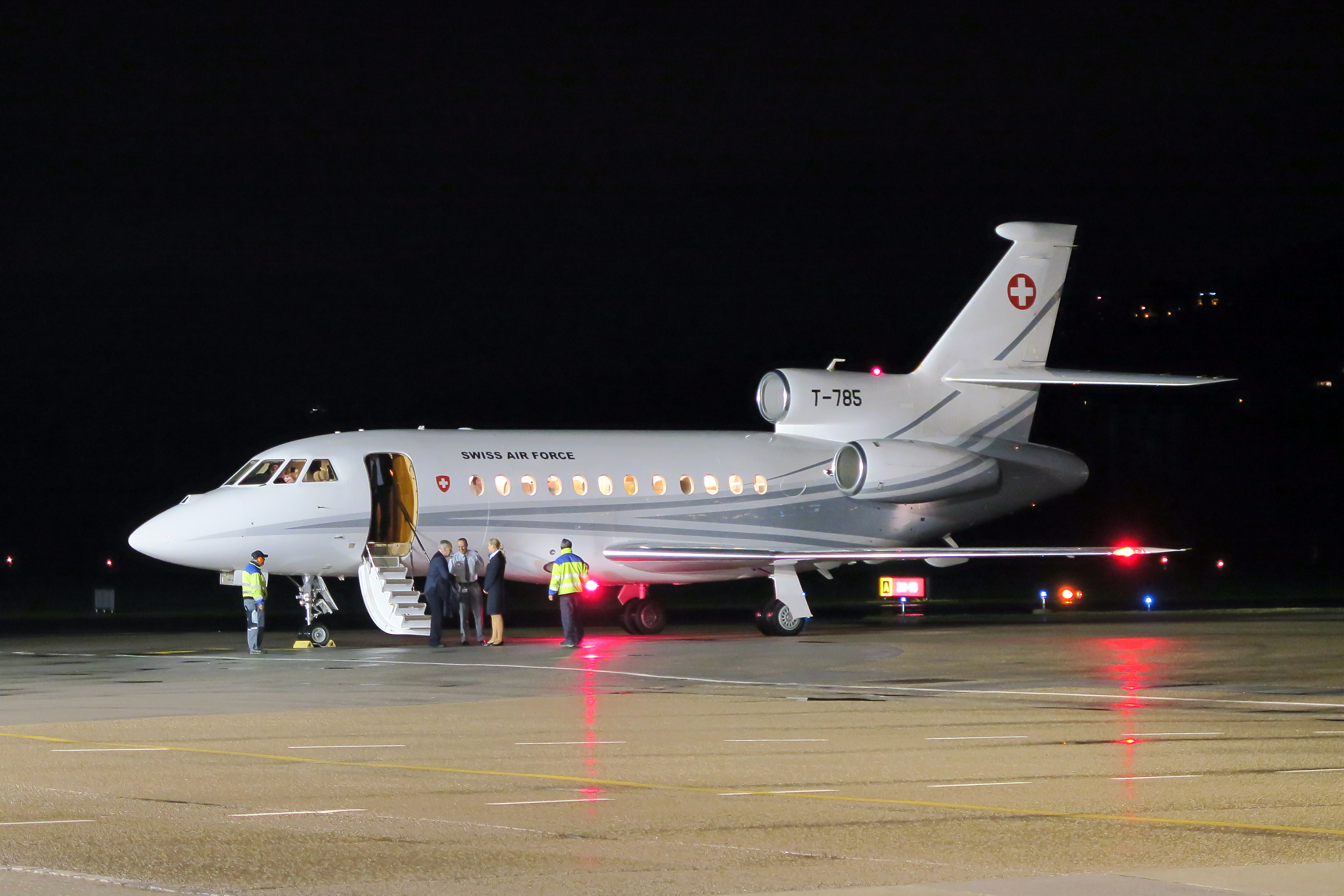
The Swiss Air Force's Dassault Falcon 900EXl

The Lufttransportdienst des Bundes (LTDB) (English: Federal Air Transport Service), a unit of the Swiss Air Force located at Bern Airport, operates a fleet of VIP transport aircraft:

- one Dassault Falcon 900EX EASy II
- one Bombardier Global 7500
- two Bombardier Challenger 604, for transport and medical evacuation
- one Beechcraft Model 350C Super King Air, non VIP transport, located at the Dübendorf Air Base

These aircraft are mainly used by members of the Swiss Federal Council. Travel arrangements are coordinated by the Government Travel Centre in the Federal Department of Foreign Affairs. A Swiss-built PC-24 of Pilatus Aircraft was used between 2019 and 2022. The Beechcraft 1900D was replaced in 2020 by two Canadair CL-604 previously operated by Rega. A Cessna 560XL Citation Excel (T-784) has been replaced in 2025 by a Bombardier Global 7500.

=== Syria ===
As of 2026, the current Syrian transitional government does not seem to be operating any jets specifically reserved for use by the president of Syria or any other high-ranking government official, with current president Ahmed al-Sharaa seemingly instead using the air transport of other nations' governments or airlines when visiting outside of Syria; however, flight data from Flightradar24 has shown a Bombardier Global 6000 operated by the Syrian Air Force, presumably for government use. As of July 2026, it is currently located at Damascus International Airport.

Prior to the fall of the Assad regime, the Ba'athist-led government of Syria operated a Dassault Falcon 900 in 2016, alongside a Dassault Falcon 20E and a Dassault Falcon 50, which all use special Syrianair callsigns. Former president Bashar al-Assad used an Airbus A320 from Syrianair during a landmark trip to Saudi Arabia.

=== Taiwan ===
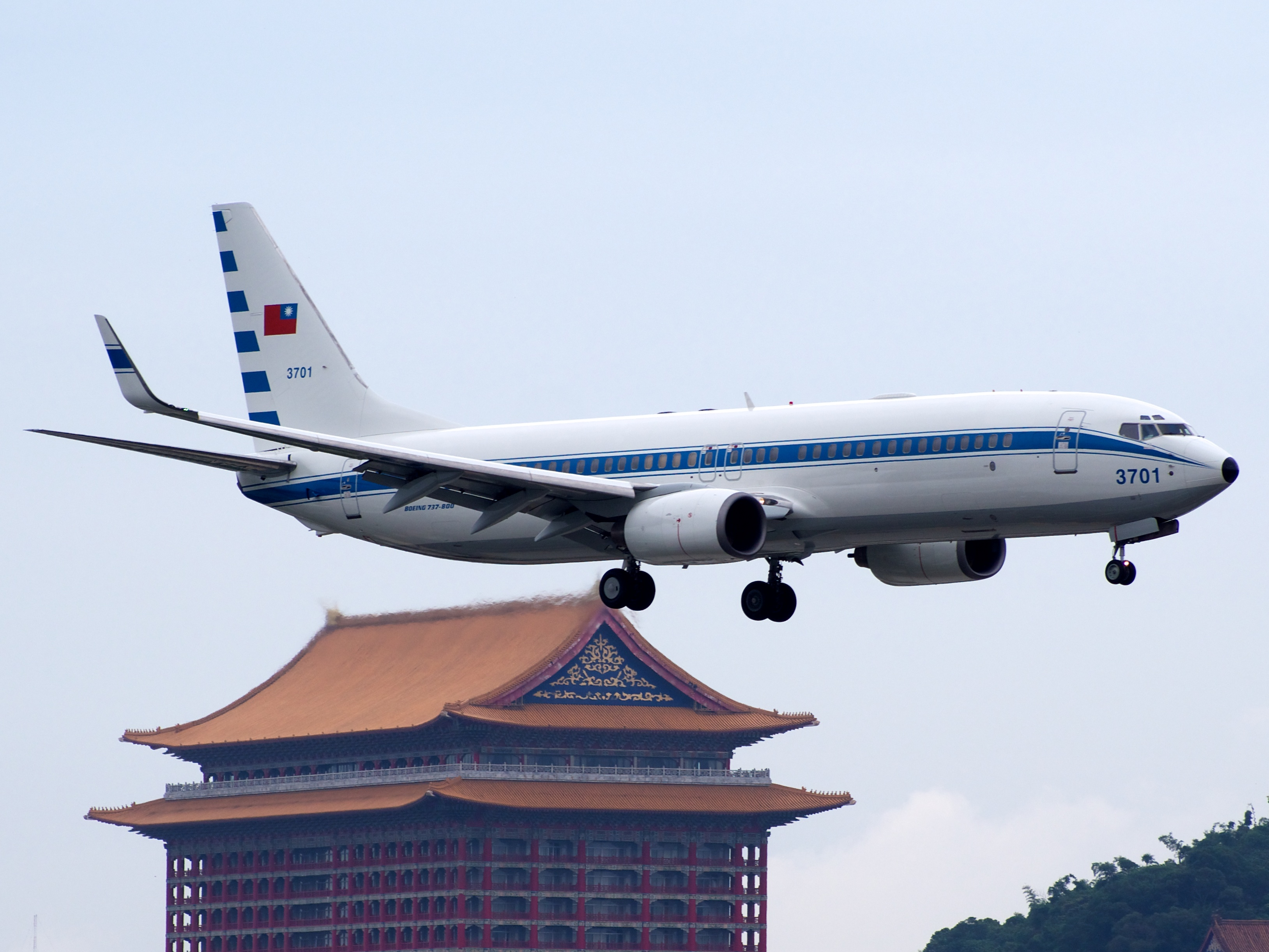
Air Force 3701, the President of the Republic of China's Boeing 737-8AR.

Air transportation for the president or other high-ranking officials of the Republic of China is operated by the Republic of China Air Force using a customized Boeing 737-800 delivered from Boeing in 2001 called the Air Force 3701.

=== Tajikistan ===
In 2023, Tajikistan acquired a Boeing 787-8 BBJ from the Mexican government for $92 million US Dollars. It is operated by Tajik carrier Somon Air for use by the President of Tajikistan.

=== Tunisia ===
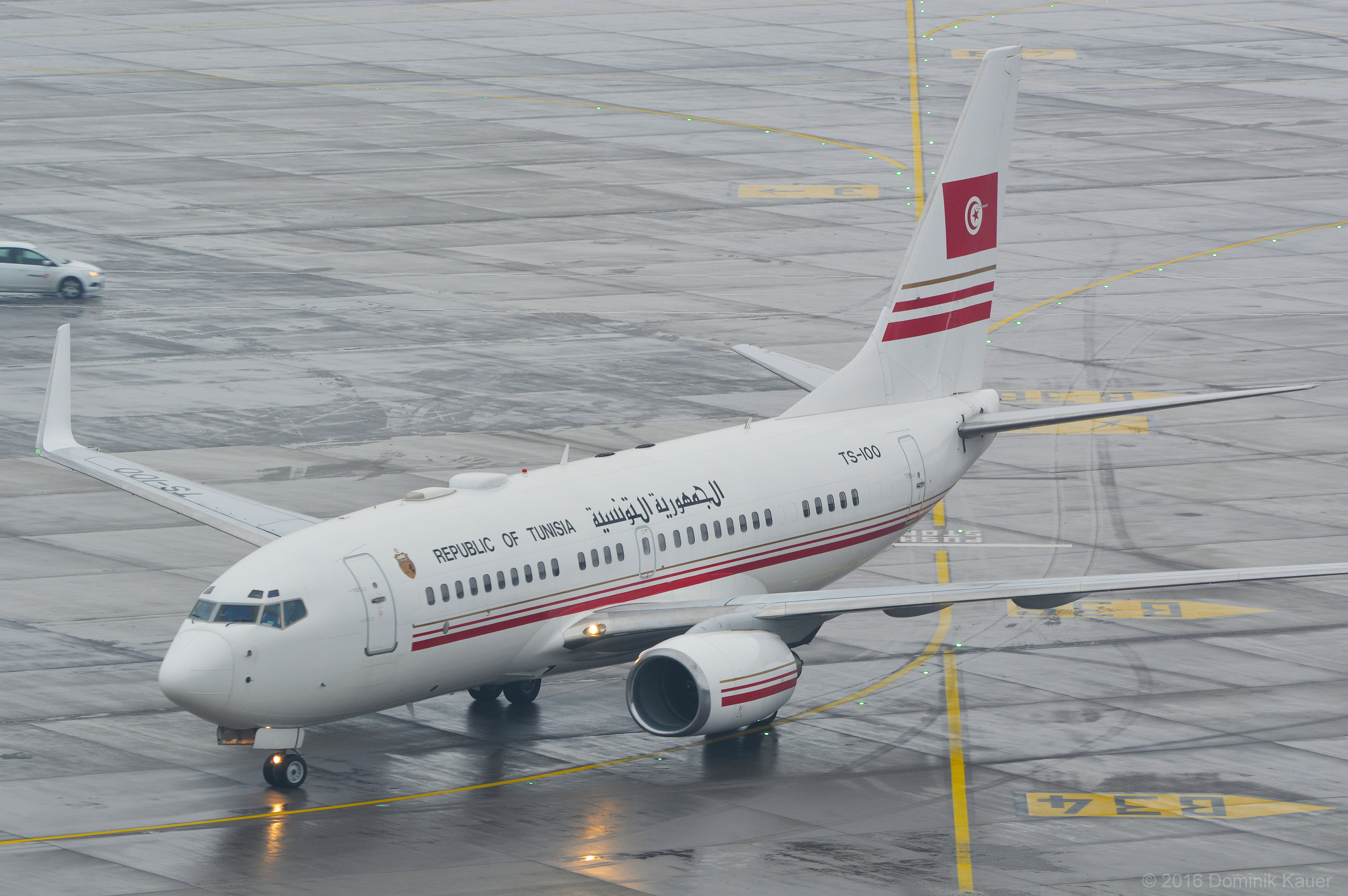
Republic of Tunisia Boeing 737 BBJ

The government of Tunisia operates a Boeing 737 BBJ bought in 1999. In 2008, President Zine el Abidine Ben Ali tried to replace it with an Airbus A340-542, but he only used it once before he sent it back to France to change the interior design. Ben Ali was ousted in the Tunisian Revolution in 2011 and the post-revolutionary government sought to get rid of the aircraft, eventually selling it to the Turkish government in 2016.

=== Turkey ===
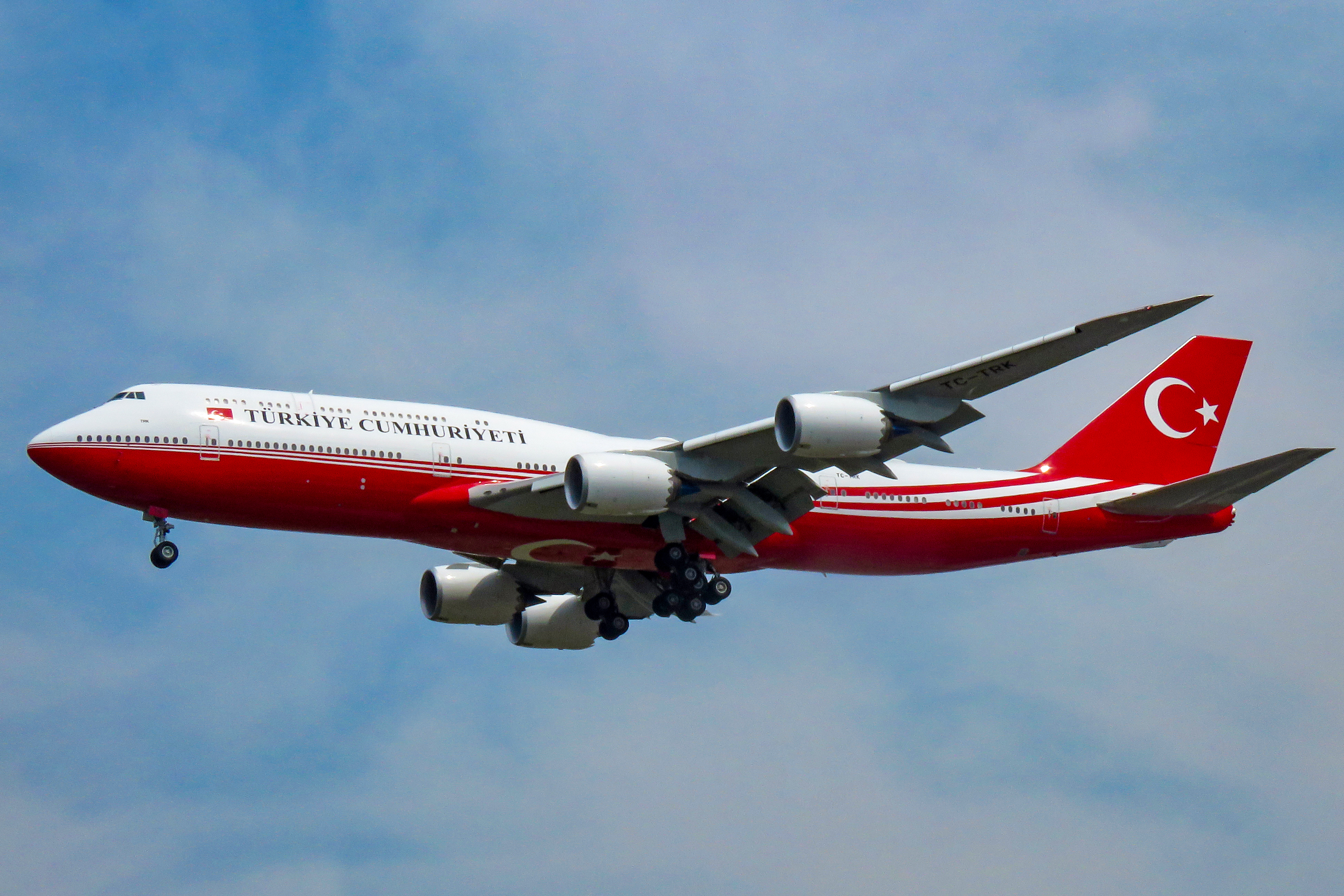
Turkish Government Boeing 747-8, 2019.

The government of Turkey has a VIP fleet which is maintained by Turkish Airlines for and on behalf of the President. Airplanes and helicopters use the state aircraft hangar at Ankara Esenboğa Airport as its main base, which was opened in 2013. The maintenance and parking operations of these aircraft and helicopters are performed here. The airplanes and helicopters are used for the domestic and international flights of the President, Vice presidents, the Speaker of the Grand National Assembly and ministers. In 2016, there was a total of 2026 flight hours performed by 11 aircraft. In the same year, the three helicopters flew together for a total of 485 hours. Flight operations and catering services of the aircraft is done by Turkish Airlines staff, while the maintenance of aircraft is done by Turkish Technic staff. The maintenance and flight operations of the helicopters are carried out by Presidential personnel.

A heavily modified Boeing 747-8 was gifted to Turkey by the royal family of Qatar.

=== Turkmenistan ===
To transport the President and top officials of the state, Turkmenistan Airlines uses one Boeing 777-200LR of a special configuration, two Boeing 737-700, one Bombardier CRJ700 Challenger 870 and two Bombardier Challenger 605.

=== Tuvalu ===
As documented in November 2025 by German aviation-related content creator Josh Cahill, the Prime Minister of Tuvalu has been seen using a Cessna Citation 700 chartered by the U.S. government during an international trip within the Pacific.

=== Uganda ===
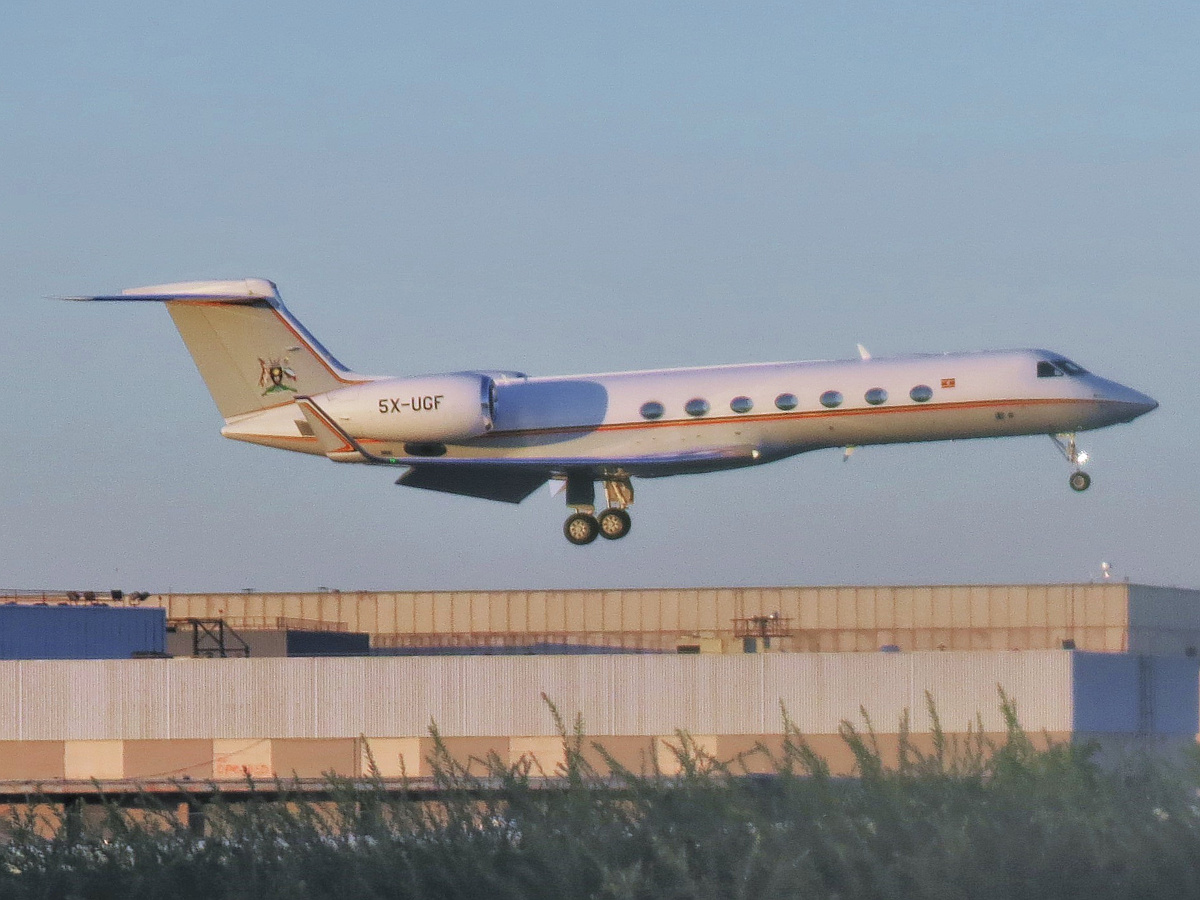
Uganda Gulfstream G550

The government of Uganda uses a Gulfstream Aerospace G550 to transport the President and government officials.

The President of Uganda uses a Mil Mi-171 of the Uganda People's Defence Force for internal flights. The helicopter was delivered in early 2016 after the government had budgeted 11.3billion Ugandan Shillings for the new helicopter. It is equipped with a cloak room, snack bar, bathroom and luggage compartment and seats up to 12 passengers.

=== Ukraine ===
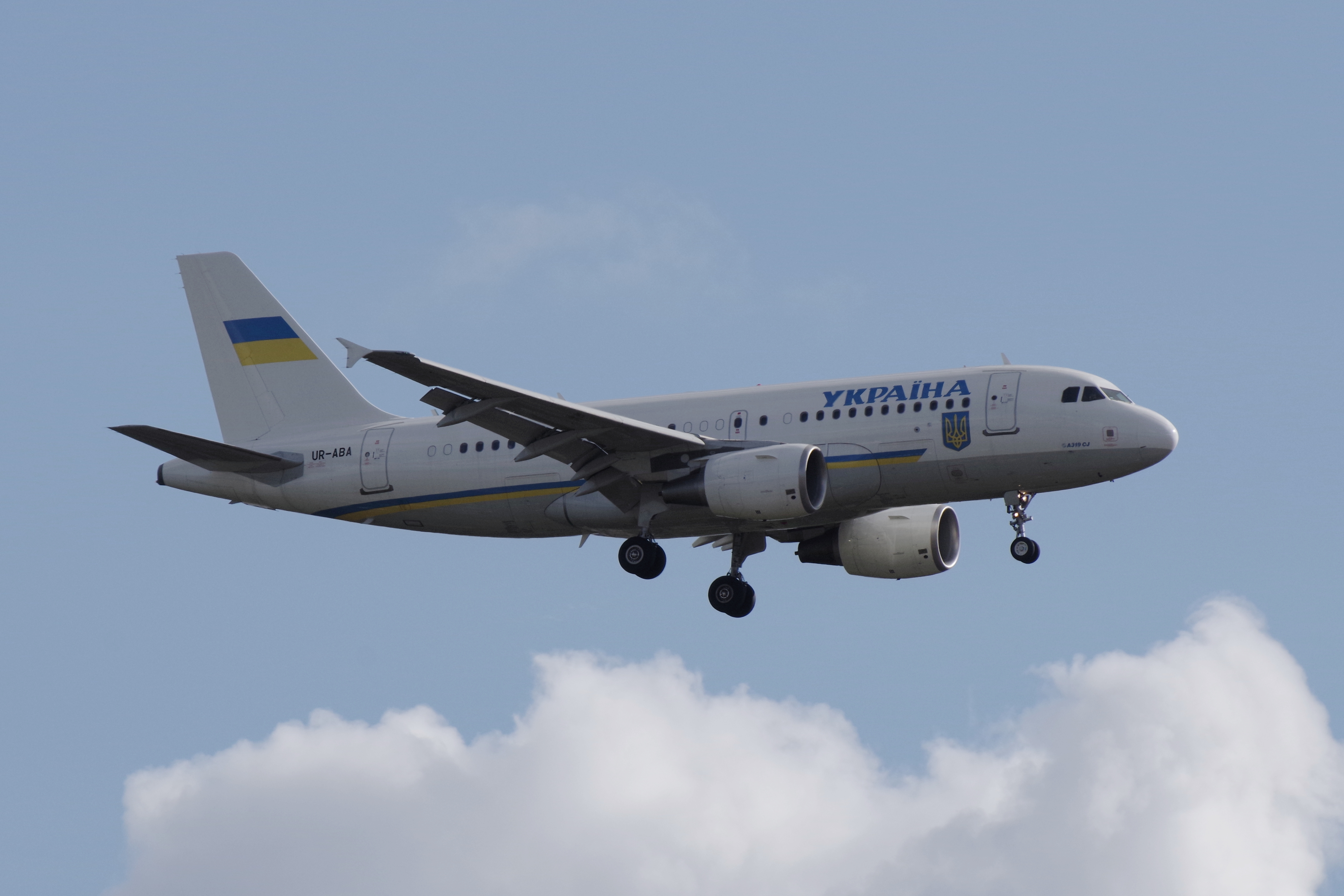
Ukrainian A319-100, 2024

Prior to the Russian full-scale invasion of Ukraine in 2022, the President of Ukraine, along with high-ranking Ukrainian government officials had use of four aircraft: a 2007 Airbus ACJ319-100, a 2011 Antonov An-148-100V, a 2001 Antonov An-74TK-300D, and a 2001 Mil Mi-8MTV-1, operated by Ukraine Air Enterprise (DAP), under the state-owned State Management of Affairs.

The An-148 and the Mil Mi-8, were transferred to Ukrainian Ministry of Defence in 2021 while the An-74 may have been lost at the Battle of Antonov Airport as DAP currently only lists the Airbus ACJ319-100 as its sole asset.

Following the outbreak of the invasion, Airbus ACJ319-100 was taken to a Dutch Air Force Base for safekeeping, then underwent an interior and avionics refit in 2022-2023 by J&C Aero and Magnetic MRO to upgrade the communications and cabin management systems for greater security. It has since been based out of a secure facility at Kraków International Airport (KRK) in Poland, from where she has logged countless miles flying Ukrainian President Volodymyr Zelenskyy to Berlin, Brasília, Brussels, Oslo, Paris, Washington, D.C., and other world capitals in his efforts to increase international support for Ukraine's defence against Russian invasion.

Painted with a Ukrainian blue and yellow cheatline over a white and gray exterior, the Airbus ACJ319-100 is a corporate jet (CJ) variant of the popular A320 family, outfitted in a VIP configuration for 19 passengers with auxiliary fuel tanks increasing her range to 6,100 nautical miles 11,100 km (6,900 miles), and includes a built-in airstairs to eliminate the need for special passenger ground-handling equipment.

While Airbus ACJ319-100 was undergoing refit, various NATO-members states provided military transportation to President Zelenskyy in order for him to make international visits to plead his case. It returned to service in September 2023.

Between 2022 and 2023, Zelenskyy used the following aircraft:
Aircraft	Service-of-origin	Visit
2022
Boeing C-40B Clipper	United States Air Force	21 December visit to the United States
2023
Boeing C-17 Globemaster III	Royal Air Force	8 February visit to the United Kingdom
Airbus A321	Royal Air Force	8–9 February connecting visit to France
Dassault Falcon 7X	French Air and Space Force	9 February connecting visit from to Belgium
Boeing 737 BBJ	Royal Netherlands Air Force	3–4 May visit to the Netherlands
Airbus A319CJ	Italian Air Force	13–14 May visit to Italy
Airbus A330-200	French Air and Space Force	2023 Arab League summit, Jeddah; 2023 G7 summit, Hiroshima
Lockheed Martin C-130J Super Hercules	Royal Danish Air Force	20–21 August visit to Denmark

=== United Kingdom ===
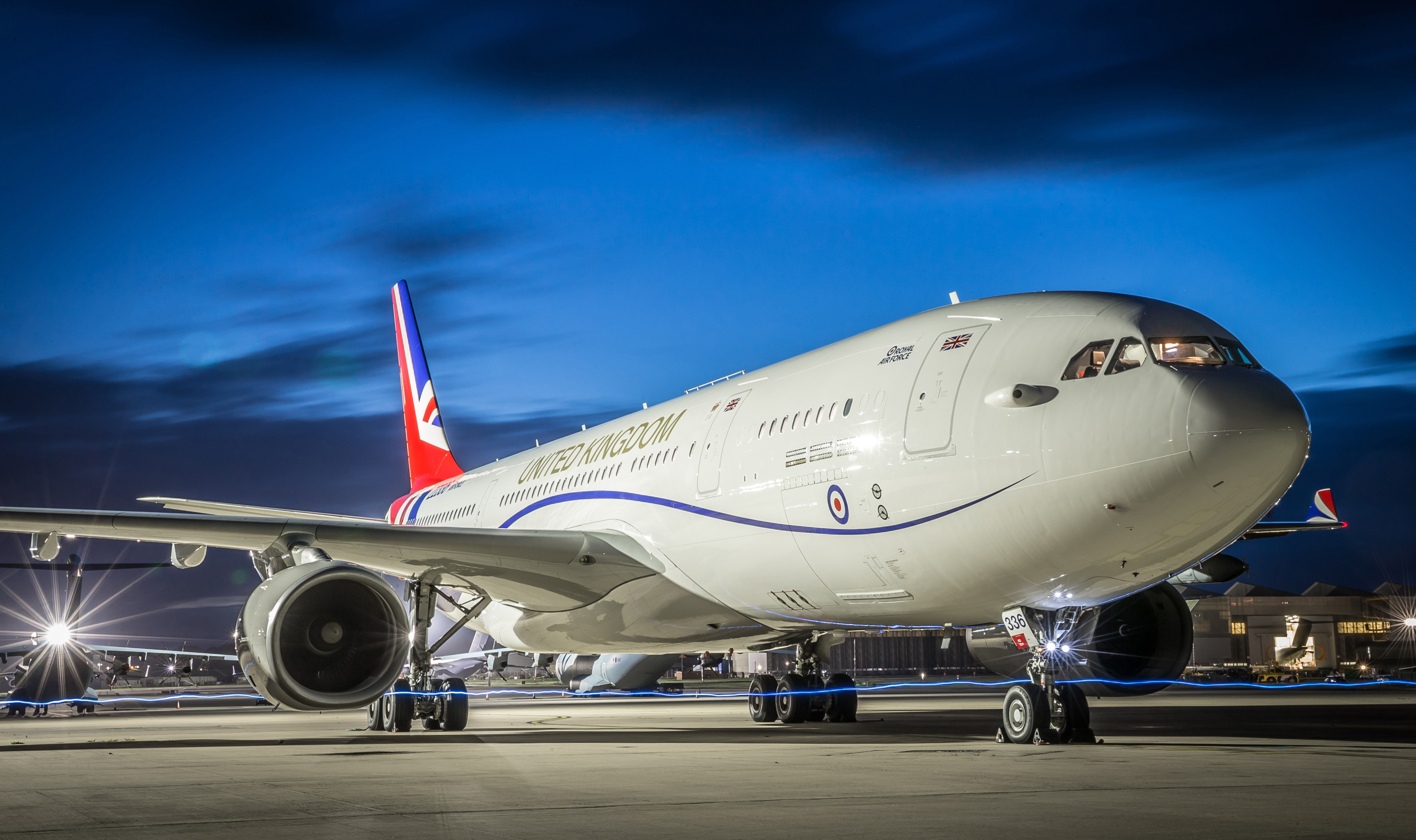
Airbus A330 Voyager

The British Government and Royal Family have use of an Airbus A330 Voyager, two Dassault 900LX and an Airbus A321LR for official travel. The King's Helicopter Flight also provides two AgustaWestland AW139.

The A330 is the single VIP variant of the A330 MRTT operated by the Royal Air Force and AirTanker for air refueling and military transport. The Voyager was reconfigured to include a secure satellite communications system, missile detection, conference facilities, 58 business class seats and 100 economy seats but retains its primary role for the Royal Air Force. Until December 2024, No. 32 (The Royal) Squadron of the RAF maintained an Agusta A109SP helicopter for use principally by the British Armed Forces. Until March 2022, the squadron operated four BAe 146s, which have been replaced by two Dassault 900LX aircraft. The A321 is owned and operated by Titan Airways on behalf of the UK Government.

=== United States ===
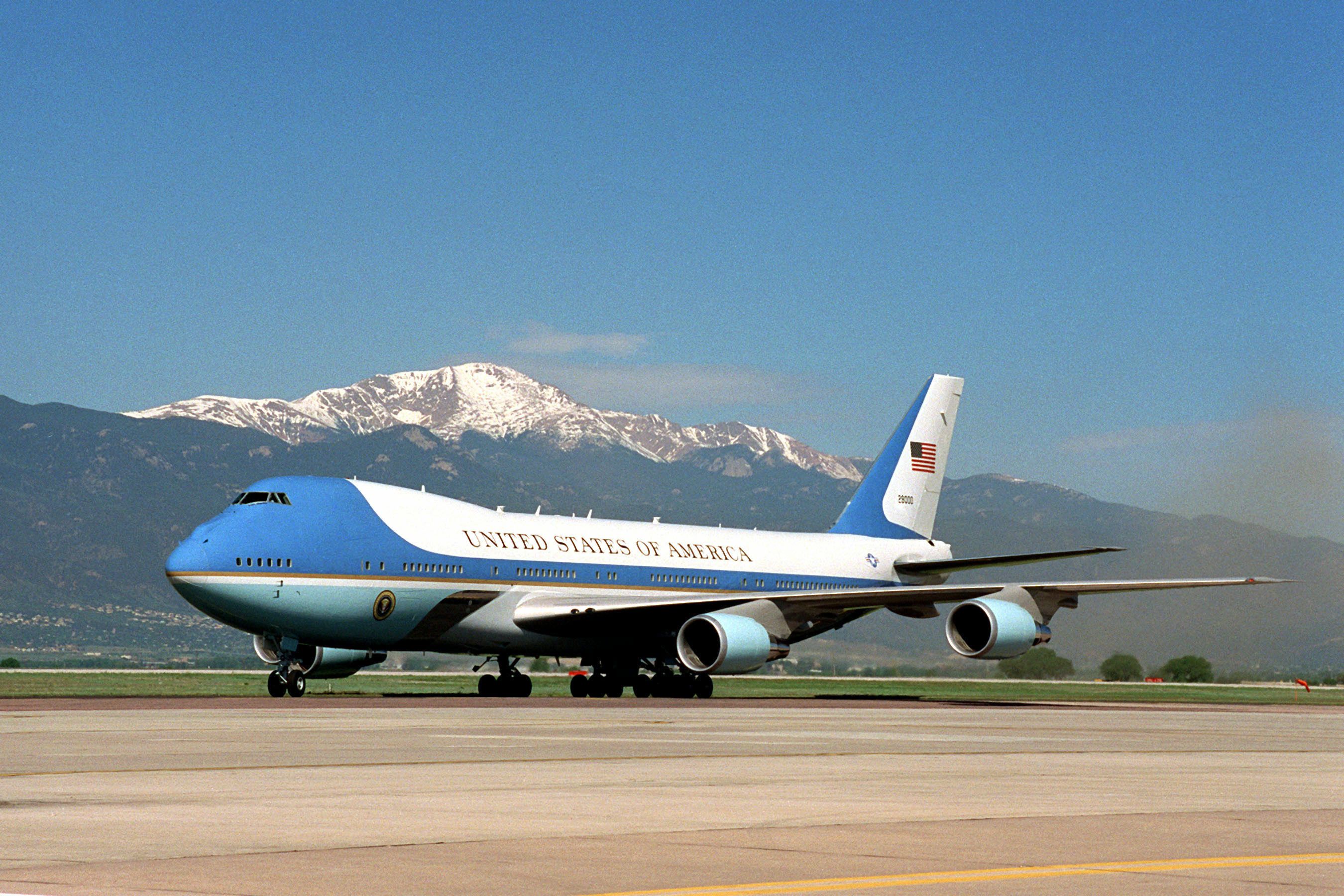
United States Air Force VC-25A (also known as Air Force One)

Air travel arrangements for the President are made by the White House Military Office, and may use one of three different types of aircraft depending on the flight and available runways. The first type is two customized Boeing 747-200B jetliners with military designation VC-25A. With a livery first designed by Raymond Loewy in 1962, they are among the most recognizable aircraft in the world and are a global symbol of the country as well as the President of the United States. They are also considered to have inspired other nations to acquire dedicated aircraft for state travel. These aircraft are primarily used by the President and are scheduled to be replaced by Boeing 747-8i aircraft, military designation VC-25B, in the near future. The VC-25 is used for airfields with runway lengths of 3,100 m (10,200 ft) or longer because the four-engine jets require longer runways for take-offs and landings. For long-distance domestic travel and all international travel, the United States Armed Forces requires that the presidential aircraft have at least four engines.

The Vice President of the United States, the First Lady and Second Ladies/Gentlemen, the Secretary of State and other high-ranking officials may use customized Boeing 757-200, Boeing 737 or Gulfstream G550 aircraft with military designations C-32A, C-40B and C-37A/B, respectively. The President-elect and Vice President-elect of the United States may also use these aircraft, a courtesy conventionally extended by the departing Administration. Each of these aircraft bear liveries based on the Loewy design. The exact aircraft used will depend on the length and destination of the flight, as these aircraft may take off and land using runways of only 1,600 m (5,200 ft) in length. However, the President only uses either VC-25A or C-32 aircraft – though, exceptionally, President Barack Obama once used a C-37A for private travel to New York City in 2009 – while the Vice President almost always uses C-32 aircraft. For long-distance domestic travel and international trips, the Secretary of Defense uses one of four modified Boeing 747-200B aircraft with the military designation of E-4B. These aircraft are specially fitted to serve as National Emergency Airborne Command Posts during wartime.

Aircraft	In Fleet	Orders
Boeing VC-25A	2	—
Boeing VC-25B	—	2
Boeing C-32A	8	—
Boeing C-40 Clipper	2	—
Total	12	2

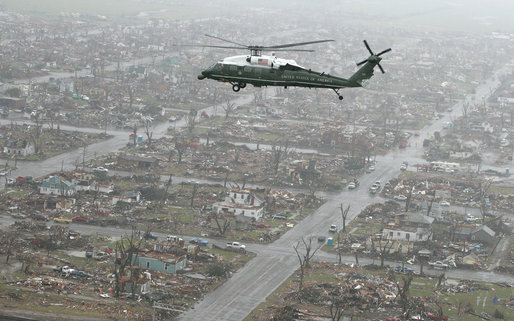
Marine One, carrying George W. Bush, flies over the devastated community of Greensburg, Kansas, after a tornado outbreak in May 2007.

The callsign of any aircraft is regular if it is not currently carrying the President or vice-president. The callsign of any military aircraft that currently carries the President is called that military branch name followed by "One", such as Air Force One, Marine One (which is typically associated with a helicopter), and, historically, Army One and Navy One. The callsign of any military aircraft that currently carries the Vice President is called that military branch name followed by "Two", such as Air Force Two, Coast Guard Two, or Marine Two (which, like Marine One, is typically associated with a helicopter). Civilian aircraft carrying the President or Vice President are designated Executive One and Executive Two respectively.

=== Vatican City / Holy See ===
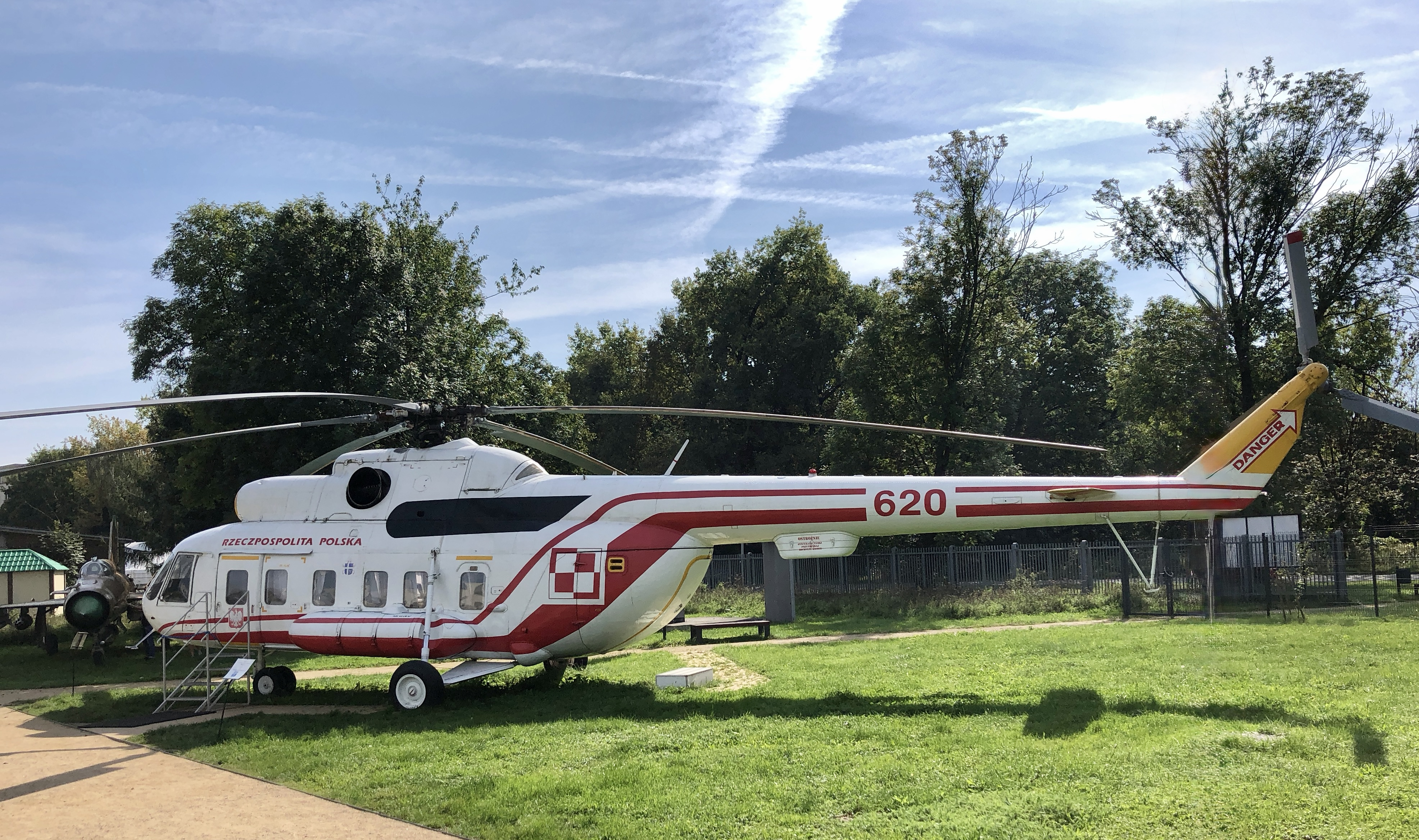
Mi-8 helicopter of the Polish Airforce configured as VIP transport and used by Pope John Paul II on his visits to Poland

Because the Holy See does not operate a sovereign airline or airport, papal travel relies entirely on chartered flights. Traditionally, the Italian flag carrier (historically Alitalia, and currently ITA Airways) transports the Pope from Rome to his destination. For the return journey to Rome, the Vatican typically charters an aircraft from the flag carrier or a major airline of the host nation.

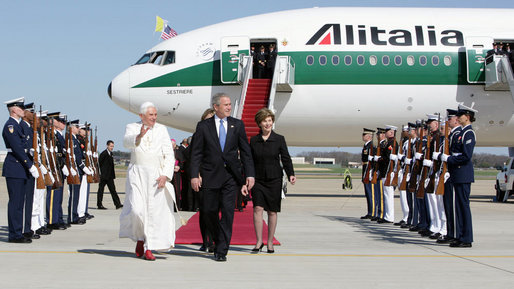
President George W. Bush walks the red carpet with Pope Benedict XVI. Behind is an Alitalia aircraft. Alitalia and its successor, ITA Airways, traditionally flies the Pope within Italy, and from Italy to foreign lands

The call sign of a papal flight within Italy is volo papale ("papal flight" in Italian) followed by the number of flights the current pope has made to that point. Pope John Paul II made 104 papal flights, so his call sign would have been Volo Papale 104. The Polish Air Force provided Pope John Paul II with a Mil Mi-8 helicopter configured as VIP transport, for his visits to Poland. The aircraft is now on display at the Polish Aviation Museum in Kraków.

Papal flights within the United States or chartered on a U.S. airline may be given the callsign "Shepherd One" by the Federal Aviation Administration. The Shepherd One callsign was also used by the Philippine Airlines Airbus A340-300 of Pope Francis when he departed from the Philippines.

For most pastoral visits within Italy, papal flights are onboard a helicopter and use the Vatican City Heliport. One exception was the pope's 2026 visit to Lampedusa. Papal helicopter flights have also taken popes to San Marino and the Principality of Monaco.

=== Vietnam ===
Vietnam has no dedicated airframe that is configured and used exclusively for VIP transport. Instead, the state uses general-purpose aircraft owned and commissioned by state-owned operators and armed forces' units for such special missions. It was designated that the General Secretary of the Communist Party, the President, Prime Minister, the Chairman of the National Assembly of Vietnam and the Permanent Member of the Party's Secretariat (collectively known as the four pillars in Vietnam) as well as equivalent representatives of other nations are objects to be served by such so-called "dignitary flights."

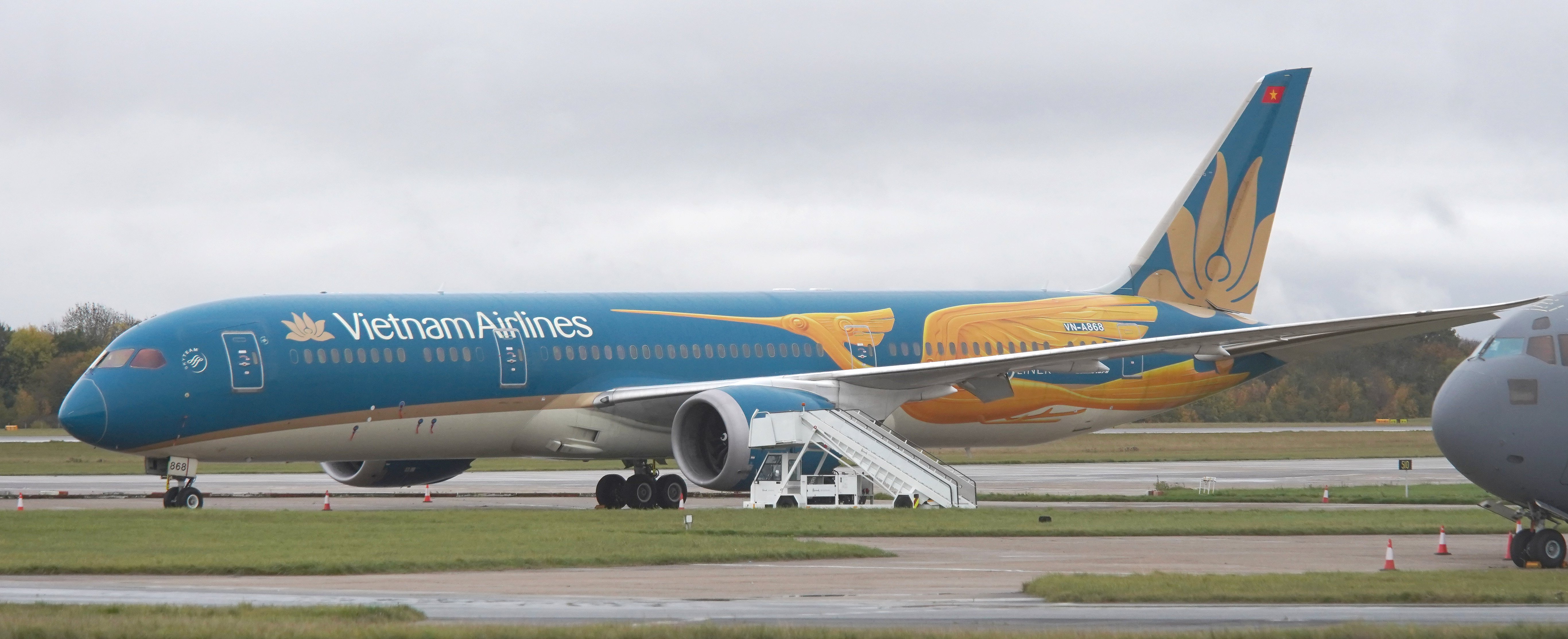
Vietnamese Boeing 787-9, with its special livery, spotted at London Stansted for Party General Secretary Tô Lâm's formal visit to the UK in 2025.

A Boeing 787-9 Dreamliner, or sometimes any Airbus A350-900 XWB chartered from Vietnam Airlines is often used for international and long haul flights. For domestic and short haul flights, an Airbus A321 can be chartered from the same carrier. The callsign Viet Nam One (VN1/HVN1) is often used when the flight is chartered by the government, especially to transport key people of the Vietnamese state, meanwhile other "lucky numbers" such as VN68 or VN88 as alternative identifications are also utilized when VN1 have been preserved for any ongoing missions. None of Vietnam Airlines airframes are currently configured specifically for VIP or Head of State transport missions, instead, they are all operating commercial services on daily basis and state leaders use the "casual" business class and are served with standard civilian crews employed by Vietnam Airlines on such VIP flights.

Helicopters of the Vietnam Helicopter Corporation and/or the Vietnam People's Air Force can also be used for VIP transport missions.

=== Yemen ===
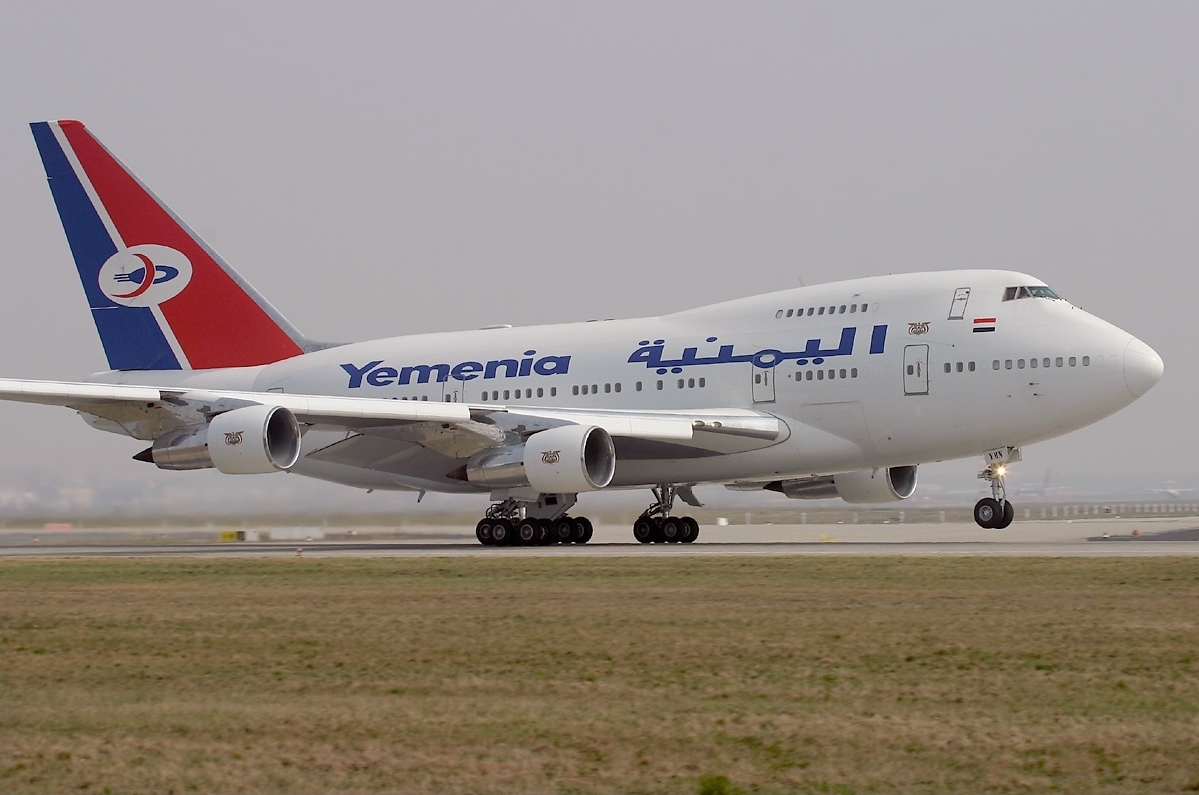
A Boeing 747SP of the Yemeni government in Yemenia colors taking off from Frankfurt Airport (2004).

Yemenia operated a VIP-configured Boeing 747SP for use by the government of Yemen. The aircraft carried the Yemenia Yemen Airways livery. In March 2015, the Boeing 747SP was damaged by gunfire during a militia attack at Aden International Airport, and a subsequent blaze destroyed the aircraft completely.

=== Zambia ===
The first Zambian president, Kenneth Kaunda, used a Douglas DC-8 of the now-liquidated Zambia Airways, among other national carriers. A Challenger CL604 was also acquired and eventually sold.

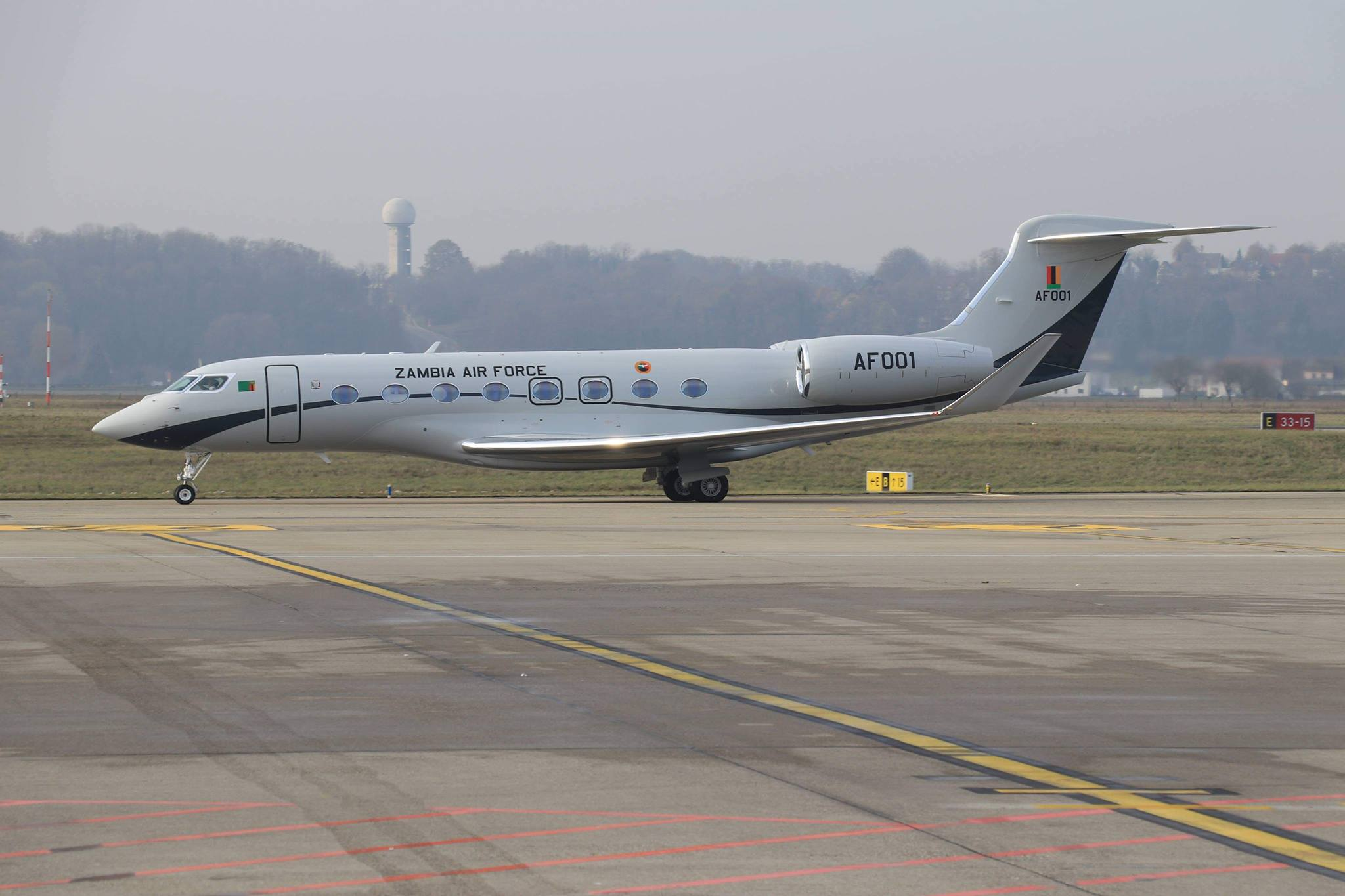
New aircraft of the President of Zambia

In 2018, the Zambian Air Force bought a Gulfstream G650 for the president and government officials. The deal sparked a scandal in the country. A Sukhoi Superjet 100 in a business jet configuration was also ordered. In 2019, the Sukhoi order was cancelled.

== See also ==
- Official state car – Secured vehicles used to transport heads of state or government
- State visit – Formal visit by a head of state to a foreign country
- Royal train – Train for the use of the monarch or other members of the royal family
- Royal yacht – Ship used by a monarch or a royal family
- Environmental impact of aviation – Effect of emissions from aircraft engines
- Executive air transports of U.S. states – Aircraft used by subnational governments in the United States for government officials
