= Heydarabad =

Heydarabad, Heidar Abad, or Haiderabad (Persian: حیدرآباد) may refer to:

== Azerbaijan ==
- Heydarabad, Azerbaijan, a village and municipality in the Sadarak Rayon of Nakhchivan Autonomous Republic
- Heydərabad, a town and municipality in the Saatly Rayon of Azerbaijan

== Bangladesh ==
- Haidarabad, Bangladesh, a village in Comilla District

== India ==
- Hyderabad, a city
- Hyderabad State, a former princely state

== Iran ==
=== Ardabil Province ===
- Heydarabad, Ardabil, a village in Meshgin Shahr County

=== Chaharmahal and Bakhtiari Province ===
- Heydarabad, Chaharmahal and Bakhtiari, a village in Kuhrang County
- Heydarabad-e Meyheh, a village in Kuhrang County

=== East Azerbaijan Province ===
- Heydarabad, Charuymaq, a village in Charuymaq County
- Heydarabad, Sarab, a village in Sarab County
- Heydarabad, Sufian, a village in Shabestar County
- Heydarabad, Tasuj, a village in Shabestar County

=== Fars Province ===
- Heydarabad, Fasa, a village in Fasa County
- Heydarabad, Gerash, a village in Gerash County
- Heydarabad, Jahrom, a village in Jahrom County
- Heydarabad, Mamasani, a village in Mamasani County
- Heydarabad, Neyriz, a village in Neyriz County
- Heydarabad, Shiraz, a village in Shiraz County

=== Golestan Province ===
- Heydarabad, Aqqala, a village in Aqqala County
- Heydarabad, Gorgan, a village in Gorgan County
- Heydarabad-e Mohammad Shir, a village in Kalaleh County

=== Hamadan Province ===
- Heydarabad, Hamadan, a village in Asadabad County

=== Hormozgan Province ===
- Heydarabad, Hormozgan, a village in Bashagard County

=== Ilam Province ===
- Heydarabad, Darreh Shahr, a village in Darreh Shahr County
- Heydarabad, Ilam, a village in Ilam County

=== Isfahan Province ===
- Heydarabad, Barzavand, a village in Ardestan County
- Heydarabad, Garmsir, a village in Ardestan County
- Heydarabad, Chadegan, a village in Chadegan County
- Heydarabad, Isfahan, a village in Isfahan County
- Heydarabad, Jarqavieh Sofla, a village in Isfahan County
- Heydarabad, Kuhpayeh, a village in Isfahan County
- Heydarabad, Semirom, a village in Semirom County
- Heydarabad-e Ali Mardani, a village in Semirom County
- Heydarabad-e Qur Tapasi, a village in Semirom County

=== Kerman Province ===
- Heydarabad, Anbarabad, a village Anbarabad County
- Heydarabad, Arzuiyeh, a village in Arzuiyeh County
- Heydarabad, Soghan, a village in Arzuiyeh County
- Heydarabad, Bardsir, a village in Bardsir County
- Heydarabad, Fahraj, a village in Fahraj County
- Heydarabad, Faryab, a village in Faryab County
- Heydarabad, Rigan, a village in Rigan County
- Heydarabad, Rudbar-e Jonubi, a village in Rudbar-e Jonubi County
- Heydarabad, Jazmurian, a village in Rudbar-e Jonubi County
- Heydarabad, Shahr-e Babak, a village in Shahr-e Babak County
- Heydarabad-e Sohrab, a village in Shahr-e Babak County

=== Kermanshah Province ===
- Heydarabad, Harsin, a village in Harsin County
- Heydarabad, Sonqor, a village in Sonqor County

=== Khuzestan Province ===
- Heydarabad, Andika, a village in Andika County
- Heydarabad, Lali, a village in Lali County

=== Kohgiluyeh and Boyer-Ahmad Province ===
- Heydarabad-e Olya, a village in Boyer-Ahmad County
- Heydarabad-e Sofla, a village in Boyer-Ahmad County
- Heydarabad-e Tang Seh Riz, a village in Boyer-Ahmad County
- Heydarabad, Kohgiluyeh and Boyer-Ahmad, a village in Kohgiluyeh County

=== Kurdistan Province ===
- Heydarabad, Kurdistan, a village in Divandarreh County

=== Lorestan Province ===
- Heydarabad, Delfan, a village in Delfan County
- Heydarabad, Kakavand, a village Delfan County
- Heydarabad-e Marali, a village in Delfan County
- Heydarabad, Dorud, a village in Dorud County
- Heydarabad, Khorramabad, a village in Khorramabad County
- Heydarabad, Honam, a village in Selseleh County
- Heydarabad-e Chenareh, a village in Selseleh County
- Heydarabad-e Saki, a village in Selseleh County

=== Markazi Province ===
- Heydarabad, Markazi, a village in Khomeyn County

=== Mazandaran Province ===
- Heydarabad, Abbasabad, a village in Abbasabad County
- Heydarabad, Juybar, a village in Juybar County

=== North Khorasan Province ===
- Heydarabad, North Khorasan, a village in North Khorasan Province, Iran

=== Qazvin Province ===
- Heydarabad, Qazvin, a village in Qazvin Province, Iran

=== Qom Province ===
- Heydarabad, Qom, a village in Qom Province, Iran

=== Razavi Khorasan Province ===
- Heydarabad, Fariman, a village in Fariman County
- Heydarabad, Firuzeh, a village in Firuzeh County
- Heydarabad, Nishapur, a village in Nishapur County

=== Semnan Province ===
- Heydarabad, Semnan, a village in Damghan County

=== Sistan and Baluchestan Province ===
- Heydarabad, Bampur, a village in Bampur County
- Heydarabad, Poshtkuh, a village in Khash County
- Heydarabad, alternate name of Karimabad-e Seyyed Ali Khamenehi, a village in Khash County

=== South Khorasan Province ===
- Heydarabad, Birjand, a village in Birjand County
- Heydarabad, Nehbandan, a village in Nehbandan County

=== Tehran Province ===
- Heydarabad, Tehran, a village in Pakdasht County

=== West Azerbaijan Province ===
- Heydarabad, Khoy, a village in Khoy County
- Heydarabad, Miandoab, a village in Miandoab County
- Heydarabad, Salmas, a village in Salmas County
- Heydarabad, Shahin Dezh, a village in Shahin Dezh County

=== Yazd Province ===
- Heydarabad, Yazd, a village in Taft County

== Pakistan ==
- Hyderabad, Sindh

== See also ==
- Hyderabad (disambiguation)
