= Heydarabad, Lorestan =

Heydarabad (Persian: حيدرآباد) in Lorestan may refer to:

- Heydarabad, Delfan, a village in the Central District of Delfan County, Lorestan Province, Iran
- Heydarabad, Kakavand, a village in Kakavand District of Delfan County, Lorestan Province, Iran
- Heydarabad-e Marali, a village in the Central District of Delfan County, Lorestan Province, Iran
- Heydarabad, Dorud, a village in Dorud County, Lorestan Province, Iran
- Heydarabad, Khorramabad, a village in Khorramabad County, Lorestan Province, Iran
- Heydarabad, Selseleh (disambiguation), villages in Selseleh County, Lorestan Province, Iran
    - Heydarabad, Honam
  - Heydarabad, Qaleh-ye Mozaffari
  - Heydarabad-e Chenareh
- Heydarabad, Honam, a village in Selseleh County, Lorestan Province, Iran
