= Sar Choqa =

Sar Choqa or Sar Cheqa (Persian: سرچقا) may refer to:

- Sar Choqa, Ilam
- Sar Choqa-ye Olya, Isfahan Province
- Sar Choqa-ye Sofla, Isfahan
- Sar Cheqa, Kermanshah
- Sar Chaqa
