= Eslamabad-e Qarakhlu =

Village in Isfahan province, Iran

Eslamabad-e Qarakhlu Persian: اسلام آبادقرخلو
- Village
- Location within Iran
- Coordinates: 31°38′00″N 51°29′54″E
- Country: Iran
- Province: Isfahan
- County: Semirom
- District: Vardasht
- Rural District: Darrehshur

Population (2016)
  - Total: 103
- Time zone: UTC+3:30 (IRST)

Eslamabad-e Qarakhlu (Persian: اسلام آبادقرخلو) (Note: Also romanized as Eslāmābād-e Qarakhlū) is a village in Darrehshur Rural District of Vardasht District in Semirom County, Isfahan province, Iran.

== Demographics ==
=== Population ===
At the time of the 2006 National Census, the village's population was 101 in 25 households, when it was in Vardasht Rural District of the Central District. The following census in 2011 counted 65 people in 20 households. The 2016 census measured the population of the village as 103 people in 33 households, by which time the rural district had been separated from the district in the formation of Vardasht District. The village was transferred to Darrehshur Rural District in the same district.
