= Bordakan =

Village in Isfahan province, Iran

Bordakan Persian: بردكان
- Village
- Location within Iran
- Coordinates: 31°28′35″N 51°35′03″E
- Country: Iran
- Province: Isfahan
- County: Semirom
- District: Vardasht
- Rural District: Darrehshur

Population (2016)
  - Total: 28
- Time zone: UTC+3:30 (IRST)

Bordakan (Persian: بردكان) (Note: Also romanized as Bordakān) is a village in Darrehshur Rural District of Vardasht District in Semirom County, Isfahan province, Iran.

== Demographics ==
=== Population ===
At the time of the 2006 National Census, the village's population was 63 in 14 households, when it was in Vardasht Rural District of the Central District. The following census in 2011 counted 30 people in 13 households. The 2016 census measured the population of the village as 28 people in 10 households, by which time the rural district had been separated from the district in the formation of Vardasht District. The village was transferred to Darrehshur Rural District in the same district.
