= Dizjan, Semirom =

Village in Isfahan province, Iran

Dizjan Persian: ديزجان
- Village
- Location within Iran
- Coordinates: 31°36′20″N 51°25′26″E
- Country: Iran
- Province: Isfahan
- County: Semirom
- District: Vardasht
- Rural District: Darrehshur

Population (2016)
  - Total: 305
- Time zone: UTC+3:30 (IRST)

Dizjan (Persian: ديزجان) (Note: Also romanized as Dīzjān; also known as Dezkān and Dīzkān) is a village in Darrehshur Rural District of Vardasht District in Semirom County, Isfahan province, Iran.

== Demographics ==
=== Population ===
At the time of the 2006 National Census, the village's population was 359 in 89 households, when it was in Vardasht Rural District of the Central District. The following census in 2011 counted 317 people in 90 households. The 2016 census measured the population of the village as 305 people in 93 households, by which time the rural district had been separated from the district in the formation of Vardasht District. The village was transferred to Darrehshur Rural District in the same district.
