= Mowla Qoli =

Village in Isfahan province, Iran

Mowla Qoli Persian: مولاقلي
- Village
- Location within Iran
- Coordinates: 31°35′13″N 51°31′36″E
- Country: Iran
- Province: Isfahan
- County: Semirom
- District: Vardasht
- Rural District: Darrehshur

Population (2016)
  - Total: 81
- Time zone: UTC+3:30 (IRST)

Mowla Qoli (Persian: مولاقلي) (Note: Also romanized as Mowlā Qolī; also known as Mowlāābād) is a village in Darrehshur Rural District of Vardasht District in Semirom County, Isfahan province, Iran.

== Demographics ==
=== Population ===
At the time of the 2006 National Census, the village's population was 70 in 16 households, when it was in Vardasht Rural District of the Central District. The following census in 2011 counted 63 people in 14 households. The 2016 census measured the population of the village as 81 people in 31 households, by which time the rural district had been separated from the district in the formation of Vardasht District. The village was transferred to Darrehshur Rural District in the same district.
