= Sabzabad, Isfahan =

Village in Isfahan province, Iran

Sabzabad Persian: سبزاباد
- Village
- Location within Iran
- Country: Iran
- Province: Isfahan
- County: Semirom
- District: Vardasht
- Rural District: Darrehshur

Population (2016)
  - Total: 54
- Time zone: UTC+3:30 (IRST)

Sabzabad (Persian: سبزاباد) (Note: Also romanized as Sabzābād; also known as Ḩājjī Sarv ‘Alī) is a village in Darrehshur Rural District of Vardasht District in Semirom County, Isfahan province, Iran.

== Demographics ==
=== Population ===
At the time of the 2006 National Census, the village's population was 114 in 26 households, when it was in Vardasht Rural District of the Central District. The following census in 2011 counted 33 people in nine households. The 2016 census measured the population of the village as 54 people in 17 households, by which time the rural district had been separated from the district in the formation of Vardasht District. The village was transferred to Darrehshur Rural District in the same district.
