= Tang-e Tir =

Village in Isfahan province, Iran

Tang-e Tir Persian: تنگ تير
- Village
- Location within Iran
- Coordinates: 31°28′14″N 51°43′31″E
- Country: Iran
- Province: Isfahan
- County: Semirom
- District: Vardasht
- Rural District: Darrehshur

Population (2016)
  - Total: 0
- Time zone: UTC+3:30 (IRST)

Tang-e Tir (Persian: تنگ تير) (Note: Also romanized as Tang-e Tīr) is a village in Darrehshur Rural District of Vardasht District in Semirom County, Isfahan province, Iran.

== Demographics ==
=== Population ===
At the time of the 2006 National Census, the village's population was 16 in five households, when it was in Vardasht Rural District of the Central District. The village did not appear in the following census of 2011. The 2016 census measured the population of the village as zero, by which time the rural district had been separated from the district in the formation of Vardasht District. The village was transferred to Darrehshur Rural District in the same district.
