= Sanbol Cheshmeh =

Village in Isfahan province, Iran

Sanbol Cheshmeh Persian: سنبل چشمه
- Village
- Country: Iran
- Province: Isfahan
- County: Semirom
- District: Vardasht
- Rural District: Darrehshur

Population (2016)
  - Total: Below reporting threshold
- Time zone: UTC+3:30 (IRST)

Sanbol Cheshmeh (Persian: سنبل چشمه) is a village in Darrehshur Rural District of Vardasht District in Semirom County, Isfahan province, Iran.

== Demographics ==
=== Population ===
At the time of the 2006 National Census, the village's population was 107 in 24 households, when it was in Vardasht Rural District of the Central District. The following census in 2011 counted 20 people in seven households. The 2016 census measured the population of the village as below the reporting threshold, by which time the rural district had been separated from the district in the formation of Vardasht District. The village was transferred to Darrehshur Rural District in the same district.
