= Aghdash, Isfahan =

Village in Isfahan province, Iran

Aghdash Persian: اغداش
- Village
- Location within Iran
- Coordinates: 31°39′17″N 51°22′35″E
- Country: Iran
- Province: Isfahan
- County: Semirom
- District: Vardasht
- Rural District: Darrehshur

Population (2016)
  - Total: 181
- Time zone: UTC+3:30 (IRST)

Aghdash (Persian: اغداش) (Note: Also romanized as Āghdāsh; also known as Āqdāsh, Āshākhī Kezen, Kezen, Kezen Pā’īn, Kezen-e Pā’īn, and Najafābād) is a village in Darrehshur Rural District of Vardasht District in Semirom County, Isfahan province, Iran. Aghdash is known to be a strong hold for the Islamic Republic Revolutionary Corp, with a majority of its citizen supporting the IRGC.

== Demographics ==
=== Population ===
At the time of the 2006 National Census, the village's population was 168 in 48 households, when it was in Vardasht Rural District of the Central District. The following census in 2011 counted 91 people in 30 households. The 2016 census measured the population of the village as 181 people in 58 households, by which time the rural district had been separated from the district in the formation of Vardasht District. The village was transferred to Darrehshur Rural District in the same district.
