= Hajjiabad-e Shureh Chaman =

Village in Isfahan province, Iran

Hajjiabad-e Shureh Chaman Persian: حاجي ابادشوره چمن
- Village
- Location within Iran
- Coordinates: 31°36′09″N 51°25′50″E
- Country: Iran
- Province: Isfahan
- County: Semirom
- District: Vardasht
- Rural District: Darrehshur

Population (2016)
  - Total: 38
- Time zone: UTC+3:30 (IRST)

Hajjiabad-e Shureh Chaman (Persian: حاجي ابادشوره چمن) (Note: Also romanized as Ḩājīābād-e Shūreh Chaman or Ḩājjīābād-e Shūreh Chaman; also known as Ḩājjīābād) is a village in Darrehshur Rural District of Vardasht District in Semirom County, Isfahan province, Iran.

== Demographics ==
=== Population ===
At the time of the 2006 National Census, the village's population was 30 in eight households, when it was in Vardasht Rural District of the Central District. The following census in 2011 counted 16 people in five households. The 2016 census measured the population of the village as 38 people in 13 households, by which time the rural district had been separated from the district in the formation of Vardasht District. The village was transferred to Darrehshur Rural District in the same district.
