= Qarah Qach, Isfahan =

Village in Isfahan province, Iran

Qarah Qach Persian: قره قاچ
- Village
- Location within Iran
- Coordinates: 31°27′28″N 51°37′23″E
- Country: Iran
- Province: Isfahan
- County: Semirom
- District: Vardasht
- Rural District: Darrehshur

Population (2016)
  - Total: 394
- Time zone: UTC+3:30 (IRST)

Qarah Qach (Persian: قره قاچ) (Note: Also romanized as Qarah Qāch; also known as Qareh Āqāj) is a village in Darrehshur Rural District of Vardasht District in Semirom County, Isfahan province, Iran.

== Demographics ==
=== Population ===
At the time of the 2006 National Census, the village's population was 398 in 105 households, when it was in Vardasht Rural District of the Central District. The following census in 2011 counted 174 people in 60 households. The 2016 census measured the population of the village as 394 people in 112 households, by which time the rural district had been separated from the district in the formation of Vardasht District. The village was transferred to Darrehshur Rural District in the same district.
