= Narmeh =

Village in Isfahan province, Iran

Narmeh Persian: نرمه
- Village
- Location within Iran
- Coordinates: 31°34′50″N 51°27′24″E
- Country: Iran
- Province: Isfahan
- County: Semirom
- District: Vardasht
- Rural District: Darrehshur

Population (2016)
  - Total: 148
- Time zone: UTC+3:30 (IRST)

Narmeh (Persian: نرمه) (Note: Also known as Narmeh Sa‘dābād and Narmeh-ye Pa’īn) is a village in Darrehshur Rural District of Vardasht District in Semirom County, Isfahan province, Iran.

== Demographics ==
=== Population ===
At the time of the 2006 National Census, the village's population was 113 in 27 households, when it was in Vardasht Rural District of the Central District. The following census in 2011 counted 64 people in 20 households. The 2016 census measured the population of the village as 148 people in 48 households, by which time the rural district had been separated from the district in the formation of Vardasht District. The village was transferred to Darrehshur Rural District in the same district.
