= Mehr Gerd =

Village in Isfahan province, Iran

Mehr Gerd Persian: مهرگرد
- Village
- Location within Iran
- Coordinates: 31°34′19″N 51°31′38″E
- Country: Iran
- Province: Isfahan
- County: Semirom
- District: Vardasht
- Rural District: Darrehshur

Population (2016)
  - Total: 1,020
- Time zone: UTC+3:30 (IRST)

Mehr Gerd (Persian: مهرگرد) (Note: Also romanized as Mehr Gard) is a village in, and the capital of, Darrehshur Rural District in Vardasht District of Semirom County, Isfahan province, Iran.

== Demographics ==
=== Population ===
At the time of the 2006 National Census, the village's population was 757 in 172 households, when it was in Vardasht Rural District of the Central District. The following census in 2011 counted 856 people in 198 households. The 2016 census measured the population of the village as 1,020 people in 304 households, by which time the rural district had been separated from the district in the formation of Vardasht District. The village was transferred to Darrehshur Rural District in the same district. Mehr Gerd was the most populous village in its rural district.
