= Dowlat Qarin-e Olya =

Village in Isfahan province, Iran

Dowlat Qarin-e Olya Persian: دولت قرين عليا
- Village
- Location within Iran
- Coordinates: 31°31′58″N 51°38′23″E
- Country: Iran
- Province: Isfahan
- County: Semirom
- District: Vardasht
- Rural District: Darrehshur

Population (2016)
  - Total: 92
- Time zone: UTC+3:30 (IRST)

Dowlat Qarin-e Olya (Persian: دولت قرين عليا) (Note: Also romanized as Dowlat Qarīn-e ‘Olyā; also known as Dowlat Qarīn-e Bālā) is a village in Darrehshur Rural District of Vardasht District in Semirom County, Isfahan province, Iran.

== Demographics ==
=== Population ===
At the time of the 2006 National Census, the village's population was 70 in 18 households, when it was in Vardasht Rural District of the Central District. The following census in 2011 counted 21 people in six households. The 2016 census measured the population of the village as 92 people in 29 households, by which time the rural district had been separated from the district in the formation of Vardasht District. The village was transferred to Darrehshur Rural District in the same district.
