= Jalalabad, Semirom =

Village in Isfahan province, Iran

Jalalabad Persian: جلال اباد
- Village
- Location within Iran
- Coordinates: 31°33′03″N 51°36′54″E
- Country: Iran
- Province: Isfahan
- County: Semirom
- District: Vardasht
- Rural District: Darrehshur

Population (2016)
  - Total: 128
- Time zone: UTC+3:30 (IRST)

Jalalabad (Persian: جلال اباد) (Note: Also romanized as Jalālābād; also known as Jalālābād-e Dowlatqarin) is a village in Darrehshur Rural District of Vardasht District in Semirom County, Isfahan province, Iran.

== Demographics ==
=== Population ===
At the time of the 2006 National Census, the village's population was 124 in 29 households, when it was in Vardasht Rural District of the Central District. The following census in 2011 counted 101 people in 27 households. The 2016 census measured the population of the village as 128 people in 38 households, by which time the rural district had been separated from the district in the formation of Vardasht District. The village was transferred to Darrehshur Rural District in the same district.
