= Asadabad, Semirom =

Village in Isfahan province, Iran

Asadabad Persian: اسداباد
- Village
- Location within Iran
- Coordinates: 31°34′55″N 51°29′24″E
- Country: Iran
- Province: Isfahan
- County: Semirom
- District: Vardasht
- Rural District: Darrehshur

Population (2016)
  - Total: 187
- Time zone: UTC+3:30 (IRST)

Asadabad (Persian: اسداباد) (Note: Also romanized as Asadābād) is a village in Darrehshur Rural District of Vardasht District in Semirom County, Isfahan province, Iran.

== Demographics ==
=== Population ===
At the time of the 2006 National Census, the village's population was 122 in 22 households, when it was in Vardasht Rural District of the Central District. The following census in 2011 counted 141 people in 27 households. The 2016 census measured the population of the village as 187 people in 51 households, by which time the rural district had been separated from the district in the formation of Vardasht District. The village was transferred to Darrehshur Rural District in the same district.
