= Aliabad-e Deh Kord =

Village in Isfahan province, Iran

Aliabad-e Deh Kord Persian: علي اباد دهکرد
- Village
- Location within Iran
- Coordinates: 31°40′45″N 51°32′20″E
- Country: Iran
- Province: Isfahan
- County: Semirom
- District: Vardasht
- Rural District: Vardasht

Population (2016)
  - Total: 179
- Time zone: UTC+3:30 (IRST)

Aliabad-e Deh Kord (Persian: علي اباد دهکرد) (Note: Also romanized as ‘Alīābād-e Deh Kord and ‘Alīābād-e Dehkord; also known as ‘Alīābād) is a village in Vardasht Rural District of Vardasht District in Semirom County, Isfahan province, Iran.

== Demographics ==
=== Population ===
At the time of the 2006 National Census, the village's population was 259 in 58 households, when it was in the Central District. The following census in 2011 counted 166 people in 44 households. The 2016 census measured the population of the village as 179 people in 53 households, by which time the rural district had been separated from the district in the formation of Vardasht District.
