= Hormozabad =

Hormozabad (Persian: هرمزاباد) may refer to:

- Hormozabad, Isfahan
- Hormozabad, Semirom, Isfahan Province
- Hormozabad, Kerman
- Hormozabad, West Azerbaijan
