= Deh Nesa-ye Sofla =

Village in Isfahan province, Iran

Deh Nesa-ye Sofla Persian: ده نساسفلي
- Village
- Location within Iran
- Coordinates: 31°35′45″N 51°29′02″E
- Country: Iran
- Province: Isfahan
- County: Semirom
- District: Vardasht
- Rural District: Darrehshur

Population (2016)
  - Total: 127
- Time zone: UTC+3:30 (IRST)

Deh Nesa-ye Sofla (Persian: ده نساسفلي) (Note: Also romanized as Deh Nesā-ye Soflá; also known as Deh Nesā-e Pā‘īn) is a village in Darrehshur Rural District of Vardasht District in Semirom County, Isfahan province, Iran.

== Demographics ==
=== Population ===
At the time of the 2006 National Census, the village's population was 123 in 29 households, when it was in Vardasht Rural District of the Central District. The following census in 2011 counted 109 people in 35 households. The 2016 census measured the population of the village as 127 people in 45 households, by which time the rural district had been separated from the district in the formation of Vardasht District. The village was transferred to Darrehshur Rural District in the same district.
