= Hoseynabad, Semirom =

Village in Isfahan province, Iran

Hoseynabad Persian: حسين اباد
- Village
- Location within Iran
- Coordinates: 31°39′01″N 51°27′57″E
- Country: Iran
- Province: Isfahan
- County: Semirom
- District: Vardasht
- Rural District: Vardasht

Population (2016)
  - Total: 379
- Time zone: UTC+3:30 (IRST)

Hoseynabad (Persian: حسين اباد) (Note: Also romanized as Ḩoseynābād; also known as Ḩoseynābād-e Vardasht) is a village in Vardasht Rural District of Vardasht District in Semirom County, Isfahan province, Iran.

== Demographics ==
=== Population ===
At the time of the 2006 National Census, the village's population was 435 in 95 households, when it was in the Central District. The following census in 2011 counted 380 people in 99 households. The 2016 census measured the population of the village as 379 people in 113 households, by which time the rural district had been separated from the district in the formation of Vardasht District.
