= Amirabad, Semirom =

Village in Isfahan province, Iran

Amirabad Persian: اميراباد
- Village
- Location within Iran
- Coordinates: 31°36′46″N 51°31′48″E
- Country: Iran
- Province: Isfahan
- County: Semirom
- District: Vardasht
- Rural District: Vardasht

Population (2016)
  - Total: 14
- Time zone: UTC+3:30 (IRST)

Amirabad (Persian: اميراباد) (Note: Also romanized as Amīrābād) is a village in Vardasht Rural District of Vardasht District in Semirom County, Isfahan province, Iran.

== Demographics ==
=== Population ===
At the time of the 2006 National Census, the village's population was 46 in 11 households, when it was in the Central District. The following census in 2011 counted 17 people in six households. The 2016 census measured the population of the village as 14 people in five households, by which time the rural district had been separated from the district in the formation of Vardasht District.
