= Eslamabad, Vardasht =

Village in Isfahan province, Iran

Eslamabad Persian: اسلام اباد
- Village
- Location within Iran
- Country: Iran
- Province: Isfahan
- County: Semirom
- District: Vardasht
- Rural District: Vardasht

Population (2016)
  - Total: 177
- Time zone: UTC+3:30 (IRST)

Eslamabad (Persian: اسلام اباد) (Note: Also romanized as Eslāmābād) is a village in Vardasht Rural District of Vardasht District in Semirom County, Isfahan province, Iran.

== Demographics ==
=== Population ===
At the time of the 2006 National Census, the village's population was 143 in 30 households, when it was in the Central District. The following census in 2011 counted 95 people in 28 households. The 2016 census measured the population of the village as 177 people in 52 households, by which time the rural district had been separated from the district in the formation of Vardasht District.
