= Mehdiabad, Semirom =

Village in Isfahan province, Iran

Mehdiabad Persian: مهدي اباد
- Village
- Location within Iran
- Country: Iran
- Province: Isfahan
- County: Semirom
- District: Vardasht
- Rural District: Vardasht

Population (2016)
  - Total: 141
- Time zone: UTC+3:30 (IRST)

Mehdiabad (Persian: مهدي اباد) (Note: Also romanized as Mehdīābād) is a village in Vardasht Rural District of Vardasht District in Semirom County, Isfahan province, Iran.

== Demographics ==
=== Population ===
At the time of the 2006 National Census, the village's population was 104 in 27 households, when it was in the Central District. The following census in 2011 counted 82 people in 20 households. The 2016 census measured the population of the village as 141 people in 44 households, by which time the rural district had been separated from the district in the formation of Vardasht District.
