= Kakaabad-e Olya =

Village in Isfahan province, Iran

Kakaabad-e Olya Persian: كاكاابادعليا
- Village
- Location within Iran
- Coordinates: 31°39′01″N 51°32′46″E
- Country: Iran
- Province: Isfahan
- County: Semirom
- District: Vardasht
- Rural District: Vardasht

Population (2016)
  - Total: 66
- Time zone: UTC+3:30 (IRST)

Kakaabad-e Olya (Persian: كاكاابادعليا) (Note: Also romanized as Kākāābād-e ‘Olyā; also known as Gāgāābād-e Bālā and Kākāābād) is a village in Vardasht Rural District of Vardasht District in Semirom County, Isfahan province, Iran.

== Demographics ==
=== Population ===
At the time of the 2006 National Census, the village's population was 63 in 14 households, when it was in the Central District. The following census in 2011 counted 39 people in 11 households. The 2016 census measured the population of the village as 66 people in 21 households, by which time the rural district had been separated from the district in the formation of Vardasht District.
