= Aliabad, Vardasht =

Village in Isfahan province, Iran

Aliabad Persian: علي اباد
- Village
- Location within Iran
- Country: Iran
- Province: Isfahan
- County: Semirom
- District: Vardasht
- Rural District: Vardasht

Population (2016)
  - Total: 19
- Time zone: UTC+3:30 (IRST)

Aliabad (Persian: علي اباد) (Note: Also romanized as ‘Alīābād) is a village in Vardasht Rural District of Vardasht District in Semirom County, Isfahan province, Iran.

== Demographics ==
=== Population ===
At the time of the 2006 National Census, the village's population was 53 in 13 households, when it was in the Central District. The following census in 2011 counted 44 people in 12 households. The 2016 census measured the population of the village as 19 people in eight households, by which time the rural district had been separated from the district in the formation of Vardasht District.
