= Varaq =

Village in Isfahan province, Iran

Varaq Persian: ورق
- Village
- Location within Iran
- Coordinates: 31°42′10″N 51°30′58″E
- Country: Iran
- Province: Isfahan
- County: Semirom
- District: Vardasht
- Rural District: Vardasht

Population (2016)
  - Total: 348
- Time zone: UTC+3:30 (IRST)

Varaq (Persian: ورق) is a village in, and the capital of, Vardasht Rural District in Vardasht District of Semirom County, Isfahan province, Iran. The previous capital of the rural district was Fathabad.

== Demographics ==
=== Population ===
At the time of the 2006 National Census, the village's population was 400 in 92 households, when it was in the Central District. The following census in 2011 counted 305 people in 91 households. The 2016 census measured the population of the village as 348 people in 120 households, by which time the rural district had been separated from the district in the formation of Vardasht District.
