= Tall Changi-ye Sofla =

Village in Isfahan province, Iran

Tall Changi-ye Sofla Persian: تل چنگي سفلي
- Village
- Location within Iran
- Country: Iran
- Province: Isfahan
- County: Semirom
- District: Vardasht
- Rural District: Vardasht

Population (2016)
  - Total: 12
- Time zone: UTC+3:30 (IRST)

Tall Changi-ye Sofla (Persian: تل چنگي سفلي) (Note: Also romanized as Tall Changī-ye Soflá; also known as Tal Jangalī, Tall Changī, and Tall Jangī) is a village in Vardasht Rural District of Vardasht District in Semirom County, Isfahan province, Iran.

== Demographics ==
=== Population ===
At the time of the 2006 National Census, the village's population was 35 in 10 households, when it was in the Central District. The following census in 2011 counted 14 people in five households. The 2016 census measured the population of the village as 12 people in four households, by which time the rural district had been separated from the district in the formation of Vardasht District.
