= Sarmeydan, Isfahan =

Village in Isfahan province, Iran

Sarmeydan Persian: سرميدان
- Village
- Location within Iran
- Country: Iran
- Province: Isfahan
- County: Semirom
- District: Vardasht
- Rural District: Vardasht

Population (2016)
  - Total: 0
- Time zone: UTC+3:30 (IRST)

Sarmeydan (Persian: سرميدان) (Note: Also romanized as Sarmeydān) is a village in Vardasht Rural District of Vardasht District in Semirom County, Isfahan province, Iran.

== Demographics ==
=== Population ===
At the time of the 2006 National Census, the village's population was 49 in nine households, when it was in the Central District. The village did not appear in the following census of 2011. The 2016 census measured the population of the village as zero, by which time the rural district had been separated from the district in the formation of Vardasht District.
