= Deh-e Ashuri =

Village in Isfahan province, Iran

Deh-e Ashuri Persian: ده عاشوري
- Village
- Location within Iran
- Coordinates: 31°39′04″N 51°30′21″E
- Country: Iran
- Province: Isfahan
- County: Semirom
- District: Vardasht
- Rural District: Vardasht

Population (2016)
  - Total: 127
- Time zone: UTC+3:30 (IRST)

Deh-e Ashuri (Persian: ده عاشوري) (Note: Also romanized as Deh-e ʿĀshūrī and Deh-e Āshūrī) is a village in Vardasht Rural District of Vardasht District in Semirom County, Isfahan province, Iran.

== Demographics ==
=== Population ===
At the time of the 2006 National Census, the village's population was 58 in nine households, when it was in the Central District. The following census in 2011 counted 55 people in 12 households. The 2016 census measured the population of the village as 127 people in 34 households, by which time the rural district had been separated from the district in the formation of Vardasht District.
