= Pirasafneh =

Village in Isfahan province, Iran

Pirasafneh Persian: پيراسفنه
- Village
- Location within Iran
- Coordinates: 31°43′31″N 51°30′08″E
- Country: Iran
- Province: Isfahan
- County: Semirom
- District: Vardasht
- Rural District: Vardasht

Population (2016)
  - Total: 105
- Time zone: UTC+3:30 (IRST)

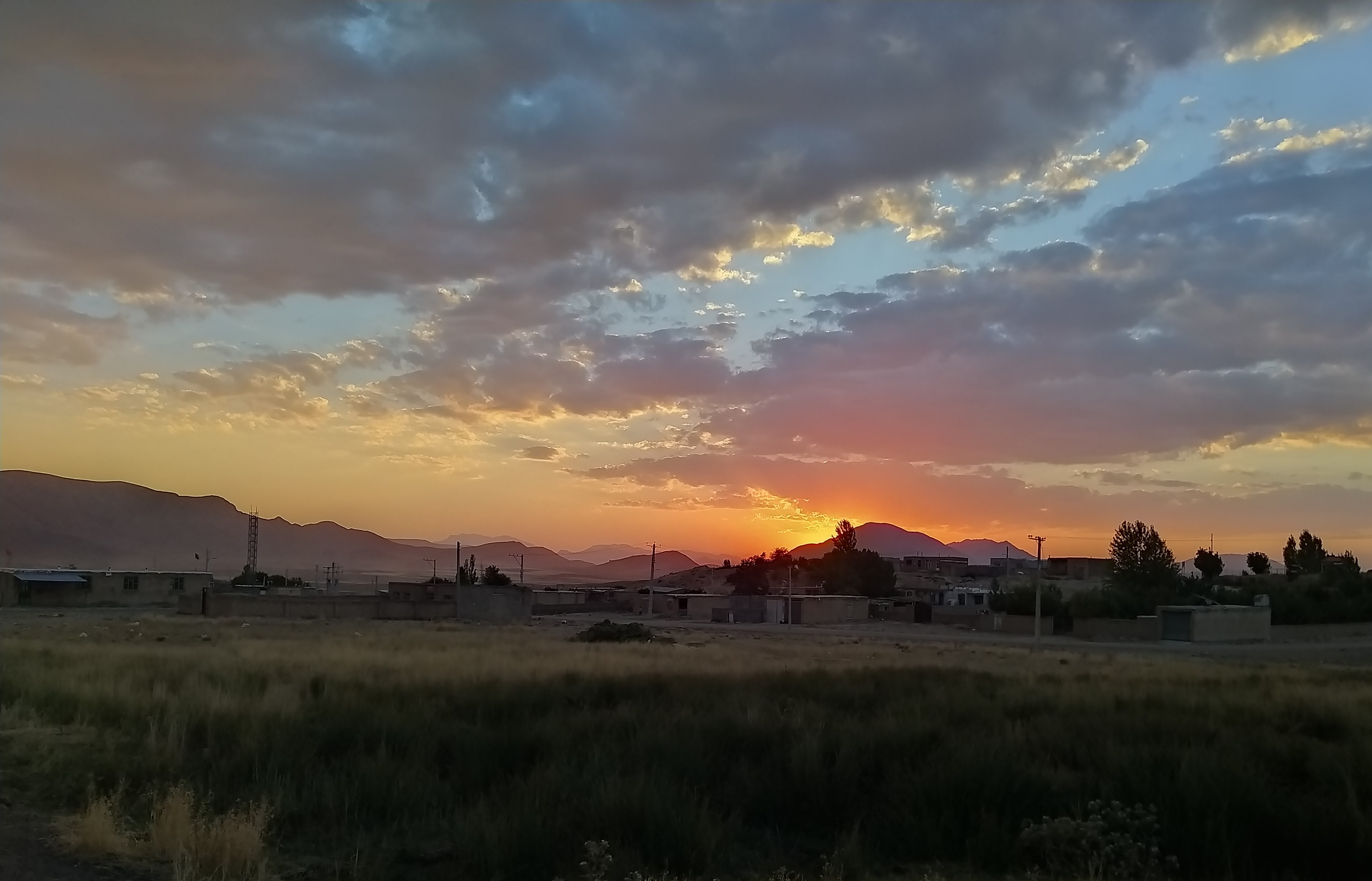

Pirasafneh (Persian: پيراسفنه) (Note: Also romanized as Pīr Esfaneh and Pīrāsafneh) is a village in Vardasht Rural District of Vardasht District in Semirom County, Isfahan province, Iran.

== Demographics ==
=== Population ===
At the time of the 2006 National Census, the village's population was 172 in 31 households, when it was in the Central District. The following census in 2011 counted 97 people in 24 households. The 2016 census measured the population of the village as 105 people in 31 households, by which time the rural district had been separated from the district in the formation of Vardasht District.
