= Muruk =

Village in Isfahan province, Iran

Muruk Persian: موروك
- Village
- Location within Iran
- Coordinates: 31°38′39″N 51°35′01″E
- Country: Iran
- Province: Isfahan
- County: Semirom
- District: Vardasht
- Rural District: Vardasht

Population (2016)
  - Total: 246
- Time zone: UTC+3:30 (IRST)

Muruk (Persian: موروك) (Note: Also romanized as Mūrūk; also known as Marūk, Merūk, Morūk, Mowrak, and Mūrak) is a village in Vardasht Rural District of Vardasht District in Semirom County, Isfahan province, Iran.

== Demographics ==
=== Population ===
At the time of the 2006 National Census, the village's population was 414 in 97 households, when it was in the Central District. The following census in 2011 counted 255 people in 71 households. The 2016 census measured the population of the village as 246 people in 71 households, by which time the rural district had been separated from the district in the formation of Vardasht District.
