= Dehkord, Isfahan =

Village in Isfahan province, Iran

Dehkord Persian: دهكرد
- Village
- Location within Iran
- Coordinates: 31°41′01″N 51°32′08″E
- Country: Iran
- Province: Isfahan
- County: Semirom
- District: Vardasht
- Rural District: Vardasht

Population (2016)
  - Total: 123
- Time zone: UTC+3:30 (IRST)

Dehkord (Persian: دهكرد) (Note: Also known as Deh Kord ‘Alīābād and Kordkandī) is a village in Vardasht Rural District of Vardasht District in Semirom County, Isfahan province, Iran.

== Demographics ==
=== Population ===
At the time of the 2006 National Census, the village's population was 182 in 44 households, when it was in the Central District. The following census in 2011 counted 184 people in 50 households. The 2016 census measured the population of the village as 123 people in 34 households, by which time the rural district had been separated from the district in the formation of Vardasht District.
