= Tall Kharowsi =

Village in Isfahan province, Iran

Tall Kharowsi Persian: تل خروسي
- Village
- Country: Iran
- Province: Isfahan
- County: Semirom
- District: Vardasht
- Rural District: Vardasht

Population (2016)
  - Total: 0
- Time zone: UTC+3:30 (IRST)

Tall Kharowsi (Persian: تل خروسي) (Note: Also romanized as Tall Kharowsī) is a village in Vardasht Rural District of Vardasht District in Semirom County, Isfahan province, Iran.

== Demographics ==
=== Population ===
At the time of the 2006 National Census, the village's population was 28 in seven households, when it was in the Central District. The village did not appear in the following census of 2011. The 2016 census measured the population of the village as zero, by which time the rural district had been separated from the district in the formation of Vardasht District.
