= Mehrabad, Semirom =

Village in Isfahan province, Iran

Mehrabad Persian: مهراباد
- Village
- Location within Iran
- Coordinates: 31°37′29″N 51°30′36″E
- Country: Iran
- Province: Isfahan
- County: Semirom
- District: Vardasht
- Rural District: Vardasht

Population (2016)
  - Total: 39
- Time zone: UTC+3:30 (IRST)

Mehrabad (Persian: مهراباد) (Note: Also romanized as Mehrābād) is a village in Vardasht Rural District of Vardasht District in Semirom County, Isfahan province, Iran.

== Demographics ==
=== Population ===
At the time of the 2006 National Census, the village's population was 72 in 15 households, when it was in the Central District. The following census in 2011 counted 26 people in seven households. The 2016 census measured the population of the village as 39 people in 15 households, by which time the rural district had been separated from the district in the formation of Vardasht District.
