= Tall Armeni =

Village in Isfahan province, Iran

Tall Armeni Persian: تل ارمني
- Village
- Country: Iran
- Province: Isfahan
- County: Semirom
- District: Vardasht
- Rural District: Vardasht

Population (2016)
  - Total: 0
- Time zone: UTC+3:30 (IRST)

Tall Armeni (Persian: تل ارمني) (Note: Also romanized as Tall Ārmanī and Tall Ārmenī) is a village in Vardasht Rural District of Vardasht District in Semirom County, Isfahan province, Iran.

== Demographics ==
=== Population ===
At the time of the 2006 National Census, the village's population was 27 in eight households, when it was in the Central District. The village did not appear in the following census of 2011. The 2016 census measured the population of the village as zero, by which time the rural district had been separated from the district in the formation of Vardasht District.
