= Deh Nesa-ye Olya =

Village in Isfahan province, Iran

Deh Nesa-ye Olya Persian: ده نساعليا
- Village
- Location within Iran
- Coordinates: 31°35′43″N 51°30′00″E
- Country: Iran
- Province: Isfahan
- County: Semirom
- District: Vardasht
- Rural District: Darrehshur

Population (2016)
  - Total: 391
- Time zone: UTC+3:30 (IRST)

Deh Nesa-ye Olya (Persian: ده نساعليا) (Note: Also romanized as Deh Nesā-ye ‘Olyā; also known as Deh Nesā-ye Bālā) is a village in Darrehshur Rural District of Vardasht District in Semirom County, Isfahan province, Iran.

== Demographics ==
=== Population ===
At the time of the 2006 National Census, the village's population was 374 in 94 households, when it was in Vardasht Rural District of the Central District. The following census in 2011 counted 413 people in 113 households. The 2016 census measured the population of the village as 391 people in 109 households, by which time the rural district had been separated from the district in the formation of Vardasht District. The village was transferred to Darrehshur Rural District in the same district.
