= Siah Kalak, Isfahan =

Village in Isfahan province, Iran

Siah Kalak Persian: سیاه کلک
- Village
- Location within Iran
- Country: Iran
- Province: Isfahan
- County: Semirom
- District: Vardasht
- Rural District: Vardasht

Population (2016)
  - Total: Below reporting threshold
- Time zone: UTC+3:30 (IRST)

Siah Kalak (Persian: سیاه کلک) (Note: Also romanized as Sīāh Kalak) is a village in Vardasht Rural District of Vardasht District in Semirom County, Isfahan province, Iran.

== Demographics ==
=== Population ===
At the time of the 2006 National Census, the village's population was 36 in 10 households, when it was in the Central District. The following census in 2011 counted 19 people in six households. The 2016 census measured the population of the village as below the reporting threshold, by which time the rural district had been separated from the district in the formation of Vardasht District.
