= Nesar Abbas =

Village in Isfahan province, Iran

Nesar Abbas Persian: نسارعباس
- Village
- Country: Iran
- Province: Isfahan
- County: Semirom
- District: Vardasht
- Rural District: Vardasht

Population (2016)
  - Total: Below reporting threshold
- Time zone: UTC+3:30 (IRST)

Nesar Abbas (Persian: نسارعباس) (Note: Also romanized as 'Nesār ʿAbbās)) is a village in Vardasht Rural District of Vardasht District in Semirom County, Isfahan province, Iran.

== Demographics ==
=== Population ===
At the time of the 2006 National Census, the village's population was 18 in five households, when it was in the Central District. The village did not appear in the following census of 2011. The 2016 census measured the population of the village as below the reporting threshold, by which time the rural district had been separated from the district in the formation of Vardasht District.
