= Cheshmeh Rahman =

Village in Isfahan province, Iran

Cheshmeh Rahman Persian: چشمه رحمان
- Village
- Location within Iran
- Coordinates: 31°43′45″N 51°21′43″E
- Country: Iran
- Province: Isfahan
- County: Semirom
- District: Vardasht
- Rural District: Vardasht

Population (2016)
  - Total: 290
- Time zone: UTC+3:30 (IRST)

Cheshmeh Rahman (Persian: چشمه رحمان) (Note: Also romanized as Cheshmeh Raḩmān and Cheshmeh-ye Raḩmān) is a village in Vardasht Rural District of Vardasht District in Semirom County, Isfahan province, Iran.

== Demographics ==
=== Population ===
At the time of the 2006 National Census, the village's population was 324 in 81 households, when it was in the Central District. The following census in 2011 counted 247 people in 63 households. The 2016 census measured the population of the village as 290 people in 83 households, by which time the rural district had been separated from the district in the formation of Vardasht District.
