= Kasegan-e Sofla =

Village in Isfahan province, Iran

Kasegan-e Sofla Persian: كاسگان سفلي
- Village
- Location within Iran
- Coordinates: 31°39′11″N 51°27′29″E
- Country: Iran
- Province: Isfahan
- County: Semirom
- District: Vardasht
- Rural District: Vardasht

Population (2016)
  - Total: 165
- Time zone: UTC+3:30 (IRST)

Kasegan-e Sofla (Persian: كاسگان سفلي) (Note: Also romanized as Kāsegān-e Soflá; also known as Kāsegān-e Pā’īn) is a village in Vardasht Rural District of Vardasht District in Semirom County, Isfahan province, Iran.

== Demographics ==
=== Population ===
At the time of the 2006 National Census, the village's population was 203 in 38 households, when it was in the Central District. The following census in 2011 counted 129 people in 29 households. The 2016 census measured the population of the village as 165 people in 47 households, by which time the rural district had been separated from the district in the formation of Vardasht District.
