= Saadatabad, Vardasht =

Village in Isfahan province, Iran

Saadatabad Persian: سعادت اباد
- Village
- Location within Iran
- Coordinates: 31°37′51″N 51°36′40″E
- Country: Iran
- Province: Isfahan
- County: Semirom
- District: Vardasht
- Rural District: Vardasht

Population (2016)
  - Total: 69
- Time zone: UTC+3:30 (IRST)

Saadatabad (Persian: سعادت اباد) (Note: Also romanized as Sa‘ādatābād; also known as Sākht-e Seydā) is a village in Vardasht Rural District of Vardasht District in Semirom County, Isfahan province, Iran.

== Demographics ==
=== Population ===
At the time of the 2006 National Census, the village's population was 128 in 23 households, when it was in the Central District. The following census in 2011 counted 63 people in 20 households. The 2016 census measured the population of the village as 69 people in 21 households, by which time the rural district had been separated from the district in the formation of Vardasht District.
