= Heydarabad-e Qur Tapasi =

Village in Isfahan province, Iran

Heydarabad-e Qur Tapasi Persian: حيدرابادقورتپسي
- Village
- Location within Iran
- Country: Iran
- Province: Isfahan
- County: Semirom
- District: Vardasht
- Rural District: Vardasht

Population (2016)
  - Total: 0
- Time zone: UTC+3:30 (IRST)

Heydarabad-e Qur Tapasi (Persian: حيدرابادقورتپسي) (Note: Also romanized as Ḩeydarābād-e Qūr Tapasī; also known as Ḩeydarābād) is a village in Vardasht Rural District of Vardasht District in Semirom County, Isfahan province, Iran.

== Demographics ==
=== Population ===
At the time of the 2006 National Census, the village's population was 23 in five households, when it was in the Central District. The village did not appear in the following census of 2011. The 2016 census measured the population of the village as zero, by which time the rural district had been separated from the district in the formation of Vardasht District.
