= HAST =

Hast or HAST may refer to:

- Highly accelerated stress testing
- Highly Available STorage
- Hawaii–Aleutian Standard Time
- Hast, Isfahan, a village in Iran
- Hammond Academy of Science and Technology

== See also ==
- Thou (for the archaic verb form thou hast)
