= Akhurum =

Village in Isfahan province, Iran

Akhurum Persian: اخوروم
- Village
- Country: Iran
- Province: Isfahan
- County: Semirom
- District: Central
- Rural District: Hana

Population (2016)
  - Total: Below reporting threshold
- Time zone: UTC+3:30 (IRST)

Akhurum (Persian: اخوروم) (Note: Also romanized as Ākhūrūm) is a village in Hana Rural District of the Central District in Semirom County, Isfahan province, Iran.

== Demographics ==
=== Population ===
At the time of the 2006 National Census, the village's population was 10 in four households. The village did not appear in the following census of 2011. The 2016 census measured the population of the village as below the reporting threshold.
