= Heydarabad-e Ali Mardani =

Village in Isfahan province, Iran

Heydarabad-e Ali Mardani Persian: حیدرآباد علیمردانی
- Village
- Location within Iran
- Coordinates: 31°38′29″N 51°34′17″E
- Country: Iran
- Province: Isfahan
- County: Semirom
- District: Vardasht
- Rural District: Vardasht

Population (2016)
  - Total: 896
- Time zone: UTC+3:30 (IRST)

Heydarabad-e Ali Mardani (Persian: حیدرآباد علیمردانی) (Note: Also romanized as Ḩeydarābād-e ʿAlī Mardānī; also known as Ḩeydarābād) is a village in Vardasht Rural District of Vardasht District in Semirom County, Isfahan province, Iran.

== Demographics ==
=== Population ===
At the time of the 2006 National Census, the village's population was 848 in 179 households, when it was in the Central District. The following census in 2011 counted 895 people in 220 households. The 2016 census measured the population of the village as 896 people in 247 households, by which time the rural district had been separated from the district in the formation of Vardasht District.
