= Cheshmeh Sard, Isfahan =

Village in Isfahan province, Iran

Cheshmeh Sard Persian: چشمه سرد
- Village
- Location within Iran
- Coordinates: 31°42′45″N 51°34′20″E
- Country: Iran
- Province: Isfahan
- County: Semirom
- District: Vardasht
- Rural District: Vardasht

Population (2016)
  - Total: 220
- Time zone: UTC+3:30 (IRST)

Cheshmeh Sard (Persian: چشمه سرد) is a village in Vardasht Rural District of Vardasht District in Semirom County, Isfahan province, Iran.

== Demographics ==
=== Population ===
At the time of the 2006 National Census, when the village was in the Central District, its population was 169 in 37 households. The following census in 2011 counted 118 people in 31 households. The 2016 census measured the population of the village as 220 people in 77 households, by which time the rural district had been separated from the district in the formation of Vardasht District.
