= Cheshmeh Qanbar =

Cheshmeh Qanbar (Persian: چشمه قنبر) may refer to:

- Cheshmeh Qanbar, Isfahan
- Cheshmeh Qanbar, Kermanshah
