= Dalek Dash =

Dalek Dash (Persian: دلك داش) may refer to:

- Dalek Dash, Isfahan
- Dalek Dash, West Azerbaijan
