= Qaleh-ye Qadam =

Village in Isfahan province, Iran

Qaleh-ye Qadam Persian: قلعه قدم
- Village
- Location within Iran
- Coordinates: 31°28′25″N 51°25′58″E
- Country: Iran
- Province: Isfahan
- County: Semirom
- District: Central
- Rural District: Vanak

Population (2016)
  - Total: 394
- Time zone: UTC+3:30 (IRST)

Qaleh-ye Qadam (Persian: قلعه قدم) (Note: Also romanized as Qal‘eh Qadam and Qal‘eh-ye Qadam) is a village in Vanak Rural District of the Central District in Semirom County, Isfahan province, Iran.

== Demographics ==
=== Population ===
At the time of the 2006 National Census, the village's population was 543 in 115 households. The following census in 2011 counted 447 people in 108 households. The 2016 census measured the population of the village as 394 people in 120 households, the most populous in its rural district.
