= Fathabad, Semirom =

Village in Isfahan province, Iran

Fathabad Persian: فتح اباد
- Village
- Location within Iran
- Coordinates: 31°36′01″N 51°32′33″E
- Country: Iran
- Province: Isfahan
- County: Semirom
- District: Vardasht
- Rural District: Vardasht

Population (2016)
  - Total: 2,023
- Time zone: UTC+3:30 (IRST)

Fathabad (Persian: فتح اباد) (Note: Also romanized as Fatḩābād) is a village in, and the former capital of, Vardasht Rural District in Vardasht District of Semirom County, Isfahan province, Iran, serving as capital of the district. The capital of the rural district has been transferred to the village of Varaq.

== Demographics ==
=== Population ===
At the time of the 2006 National Census, the village's population was 1,218 in 283 households, when it was in the Central District. The following census in 2011 counted 1,520 people in 420 households. The 2016 census measured the population of the village as 2,023 people in 582 households, by which time the rural district had been separated from the district in the formation of Vardasht District. Fathabad was the most populous village in its rural district.
