= Sar Choqa-ye Olya =

Village in Isfahan province, Iran

Sar Choqa-ye Olya Persian: سرچقاعليا
- Village
- Location within Iran
- Coordinates: 31°38′08″N 51°31′56″E
- Country: Iran
- Province: Isfahan
- County: Semirom
- District: Vardasht
- Rural District: Vardasht

Population (2016)
  - Total: 28
- Time zone: UTC+3:30 (IRST)

Sar Choqa-ye Olya (Persian: سرچقاعليا) (Note: Also romanized as Sar Cheqā-ye ‘Olyā and Sar Choqā ‘Olyā; also known as Sar Chaqā, Sar Cheqā Bālā, and Sar Chogā Bālā) is a village in Vardasht Rural District of Vardasht District in Semirom County, Isfahan province, Iran.

== Demographics ==
=== Population ===
At the time of the 2006 National Census, the village's population was 44 in 15 households, when it was in the Central District. The following census in 2011 counted 36 people in 11 households. The 2016 census measured the population of the village as 28 people in 12 households, by which time the rural district had been separated from the district in the formation of Vardasht District.
