= Qaleh-ye Eslamabad =

Village in Isfahan province, Iran

Qaleh-ye Eslamabad Persian: قلعه اسلام آباد
- Village
- Location within Iran
- Coordinates: 31°11′51″N 51°48′23″E
- Country: Iran
- Province: Isfahan
- County: Semirom
- District: Central
- Rural District: Hana

Population (2016)
  - Total: 128
- Time zone: UTC+3:30 (IRST)

Qaleh-ye Eslamabad (Persian: قلعه اسلام آباد) (Note: Also romanized as Qal‘eh Eslāmābād and Qal‘eh-ye Eslāmābād; formerly known as Eslamabad (اسلام اباد), also romanized as Eslāmābād; also known as Qal‘eh-ye Mokhtār Khān) is a village in Hana Rural District of the Central District in Semirom County, Isfahan province, Iran.

== Demographics ==
=== Population ===
At the time of the 2006 National Census, the village's population, as Eslamabad, was 326 in 96 households. The following census in 2011 counted 111 people in 32 households, by which time the village was listed as Qaleh-ye Eslamabad. The 2016 census measured the population of the village as 128 people in 36 households.
