= Sar Choqa-ye Sofla, Isfahan =

Village in Isfahan province, Iran

Sar Choqa-ye Sofla Persian: سرچقاسفلي
- Village
- Location within Iran
- Coordinates: 33°00′34″N 49°40′05″E
- Country: Iran
- Province: Isfahan
- County: Semirom
- District: Vardasht
- Rural District: Vardasht

Population (2016)
  - Total: 93
- Time zone: UTC+3:30 (IRST)

Sar Choqa-ye Sofla (Persian: سرچقاسفلي) (Note: Also romanized as Sar Choqā-ye Soflá; also known as Qerekhlū, Sar Chaqā, Sar Cheqā Pā’īn, and Sarchoghā Pā’īn) is a village in Vardasht Rural District of Vardasht District in Semirom County, Isfahan province, Iran.

== Demographics ==
=== Population ===
At the time of the 2006 National Census, the village's population was 147 in 30 households, when it was in the Central District. The following census in 2011 counted 111 people in 29 households. The 2016 census measured the population of the village as 93 people in 30 households, by which time the rural district had been separated from the district in the formation of Vardasht District.
