= Heydarabad, Selseleh =

Heydarabad (Persian: حيدرآباد) in Selseleh County, may refer to:

- Heydarabad, Honam
- Heydarabad, Qaleh-ye Mozaffari
- Heydarabad-e Chenareh
