= Garmuk, Isfahan =

Village in Isfahan province, Iran

Garmuk Persian: گرموك
- Village
- Location within Iran
- Coordinates: 31°23′20″N 51°43′37″E
- Country: Iran
- Province: Isfahan
- County: Semirom
- District: Central
- Rural District: Hana

Population (2016)
  - Total: 1,209
- Time zone: UTC+3:30 (IRST)

Garmuk (Persian: گرموك) (Note: Also romanized as Garmūk) is a village in Hana Rural District of the Central District in Semirom County, Isfahan province, Iran.

== Demographics ==
=== Population ===
At the time of the 2006 National Census, the village's population was 1,115 in 221 households. The following census in 2011 counted 1,083 people in 246 households. The 2016 census measured the population of the village as 1,209 people in 344 households.
