= Heydarabad-e Kahnuj =

Heydarabad-e Kahnuj or Heidar Abad Kahnooj (Persian: حيدرابادكهنوج) may refer to:

- Heydarabad-e Kahnuj, Anbarabad
- Heydarabad-e Kahnuj, Faryab
