= Cheshmeh Khuni =

Village in Isfahan province, Iran

Cheshmeh Khuni Persian: چشمه خوني
- Village
- Location within Iran
- Coordinates: 31°07′44″N 51°39′42″E
- Country: Iran
- Province: Isfahan
- County: Semirom
- District: Central
- Rural District: Hana

Population (2016)
  - Total: 160
- Time zone: UTC+3:30 (IRST)

Cheshmeh Khuni (Persian: چشمه خوني) (Note: Also romanized as Cheshmeh Khūnī) is a village in Hana Rural District of the Central District in Semirom County, Isfahan province, Iran.

== Demographics ==
=== Population ===
At the time of the 2006 National Census, the village's population was 166 in 40 households. The following census in 2011 counted 131 people in 35 households. The 2016 census measured the population of the village as 160 people in 39 households.
