= Gol Afshan, Isfahan =

Village in Isfahan province, Iran

Gol Afshan Persian: گل افشان
- Village
- Location within Iran
- Coordinates: 31°14′32″N 51°46′42″E
- Country: Iran
- Province: Isfahan
- County: Semirom
- District: Central
- Rural District: Hana

Population (2016)
  - Total: 1,236
- Time zone: UTC+3:30 (IRST)

Gol Afshan (Persian: گل افشان) (Note: Also romanized as Golāfshān) is a village in Hana Rural District of the Central District in Semirom County, Isfahan province, Iran.

== Demographics ==
=== Population ===
At the time of the 2006 National Census, the village's population was 677 in 137 households. The following census in 2011 counted 461 people in 113 households. The 2016 census measured the population of the village as 1,236 people in 310 households, the most populous in its rural district.
