= Deh Nesa =

Deh Nesa (Persian: ده نسا) may refer to:

- Deh Nesa-ye Olya
- Deh Nesa-ye Sofla
