= Heydarabad, Semirom =

Village in Isfahan province, Iran

Heydarabad Persian: حيدراباد
- Village
- Location within Iran
- Coordinates: 31°44′05″N 51°21′08″E
- Country: Iran
- Province: Isfahan
- County: Semirom
- District: Vardasht
- Rural District: Vardasht

Population (2016)
  - Total: 74
- Time zone: UTC+3:30 (IRST)

Heydarabad (Persian: حیدرآباد) (Note: Also romanized as Ḩeydarābād; also known as Hemmatābād and Ḩeydarābād-e ‘Abbāsī) is a village in Vardasht Rural District of Vardasht District in Semirom County, Isfahan province, Iran.

== Demographics ==
=== Population ===
At the time of the 2006 National Census, the village's population was 94 in 23 households, when it was in the Central District. The following census in 2011 counted 69 people in 20 households. The 2016 census measured the population of the village as 74 people in 25 households, by which time the rural district had been separated from the district in the formation of Vardasht District.
