= Darrehshur Rural District =

Rural district in Isfahan province, Iran

Darrehshur Rural District Persian: دهستان دره شور
- Rural District
- Location within Iran
- Coordinates: 31°32′N 51°31′E
- Country: Iran
- Province: Isfahan
- County: Semirom
- District: Vardasht
- Established: 2003
- Capital: Mehr Gerd

Population (2016)
  - Total: 3,799
- Time zone: UTC+3:30 (IRST)

Darrehshur Rural District (Persian: دهستان دره شور) is in Vardasht District of Semirom County, Isfahan province, Iran. Its capital is the village of Mehr Gerd.

== History ==
In 2012, Vardasht Rural District was separated from the Central District in the formation of Vardasht District.

== Demographics ==
=== Population ===
At the time of the 2016 National Census, the rural district's population was 3,799 in 1,161 households. The most populous of its 57 villages was Mehr Gerd, with 1,020 people.

=== Other villages in the rural district ===
- Aghdash
- Asadabad
- Bordakan
- Dalek Dash
- Deh Nesa-ye Olya
- Deh Nesa-ye Sofla
- Dizjan
- Dowlat Qarin-e Olya
- Eslamabad-e Qarakhlu
- Hajjiabad
- Hajjiabad-e Shureh Chaman
- Jalalabad
- Kezen
- Mowla Qoli
- Narmeh
- Nurabad
- Qarah Qach
- Sabzabad
- Sadeqabad
- Sanbol Cheshmeh
- Tang-e Tir
