= Qaleh Sangi, Isfahan =

Village in Isfahan province, Iran

Qaleh Sangi Persian: قلعه سنگي
- Village
- Location within Iran
- Coordinates: 31°12′02″N 51°51′13″E
- Country: Iran
- Province: Isfahan
- County: Semirom
- District: Central
- Rural District: Hana

Population (2016)
  - Total: 0
- Time zone: UTC+3:30 (IRST)

Qaleh Sangi (Persian: قلعه سنگي) (Note: Also romanized as Qal‘eh Sangī and Qal‘eh-ye Sangī) is a village in Hana Rural District of the Central District in Semirom County, Isfahan province, Iran.

== Demographics ==
=== Population ===
At the time of the 2006 National Census, the village's population was 35 in nine households. The village did not appear in the following census of 2011. The 2016 census measured the population of the village as zero.
