= Tabaqeh =

Village in Isfahan province, Iran

Tabaqeh Persian: طبقه
- Village
- Country: Iran
- Province: Isfahan
- County: Semirom
- District: Central
- Rural District: Hana

Population (2016)
  - Total: 0
- Time zone: UTC+3:30 (IRST)

Tabaqeh (Persian: طبقه) (Note: Also romanized as Ţabaqeh) is a village in Hana Rural District of the Central District in Semirom County, Isfahan province, Iran.

== Demographics ==
=== Population ===
At the time of the 2006 National Census, the village's population was 37 in seven households. The village did not appear in the following census of 2011. The 2016 census measured the population of the village as zero.
