= Cheshmeh Sard =

Cheshmeh Sard (Persian: چشمه سرد) may refer to:

- Cheshmeh Sard, Isfahan
- Cheshmeh Sard, Lorestan
