= Zarghamabad, Isfahan =

Village in Isfahan province, Iran

Zarghamabad Persian: ضرغام اباد
- Village
- Location within Iran
- Coordinates: 31°14′43″N 51°35′14″E
- Country: Iran
- Province: Isfahan
- County: Semirom
- District: Central
- Rural District: Hana

Population (2016)
  - Total: 250
- Time zone: UTC+3:30 (IRST)

Zarghamabad (Persian: ضرغام اباد) (Note: Also romanized as Ẕarghāmābād) is a village in Hana Rural District of the Central District in Semirom County, Isfahan province, Iran.

== Demographics ==
=== Population ===
At the time of the 2006 National Census, the village's population was 188 in 40 households. The following census in 2011 counted 168 people in 41 households. The 2016 census measured the population of the village as 250 people in 71 households.
