= Hast, Isfahan =

Village in Isfahan province, Iran

Hast Persian: هست
- Village
- Location within Iran
- Coordinates: 31°20′25″N 51°35′47″E
- Country: Iran
- Province: Isfahan
- County: Semirom
- District: Central
- Rural District: Hana

Population (2016)
  - Total: 210
- Time zone: UTC+3:30 (IRST)

Hast (Persian: هست) is a village in Hana Rural District of the Central District in Semirom County, Isfahan province, Iran.

== Demographics ==
=== Population ===
At the time of the 2006 National Census, the village's population was 190 in 45 households. The following census in 2011 counted 146 people in 35 households. The 2016 census measured the population of the village as 210 people in 61 households.
