= Luis Gabriel Aguilera =

- Born: Irapuato, Guanajuato, M.X.
- Origin: Chicago, Illinois, U.S.
- Genres: Techno, Minimal, House, Ambient, Experimental
- Occupations: Dj, music producer, composer, writer, critic
- Instruments: Turntables, DAW
- Years active: 1987–present
- Label: [Full Spectrum]
- Website: cdbaby.com/artist/LuisGabrielAguilera

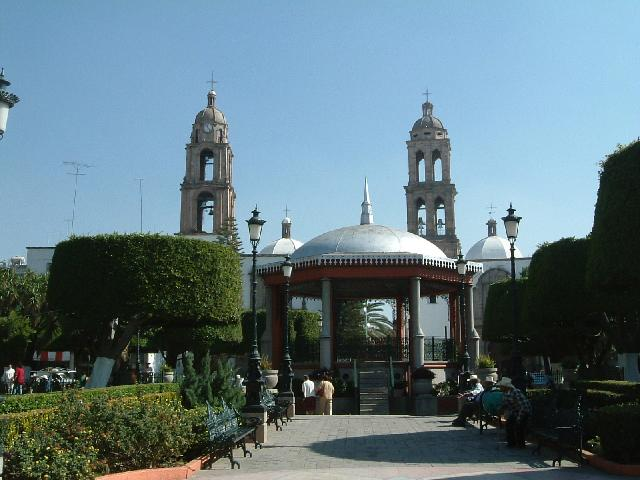
Irapuato Plaza Principal

Luis Gabriel Aguilera (born in Irapuato, Guanajuato, Mexico) is a Mexican-American author, writer, composer, electronic music producer, DJ, music promoter, language teacher, and social justice activist.

At age 14, Aguilera was a founding member of the Ultimate Party Crew, a Chicago Southwest Side male teen youth club that was one among numerous teen youth clubs prevalent in the late 1980s and 1990s in Chicago and other urban settings such as New York and Los Angeles. The group disbanded in 1991 due to rising urban street violence, gang encroachment, and the group's awareness that the organization had grown too large to maintain earlier levels of familial interaction. Aguilera chronicled this and other sociocultural aspects of his teen years in Chicago in a memoir, Gabriel's Fire, published by The University of Chicago Press in April 2000.

Aguilera is also founder and director of Full Spectrum, a multifaceted initiative that took root on the campus of The University of Chicago where Aguilera, in conjunction with a student organization and campus radio station WHPK, produced, promoted, and presented several electronic dance music events from 1997 to 1998 known as Positive Thursdays in which Aguilera would DJ for said events as well. Aguilera resides in Chicago, producing and promoting music under his Full Spectrum label and other electronic dance music labels.

== Early life and education: 1973–2009 ==
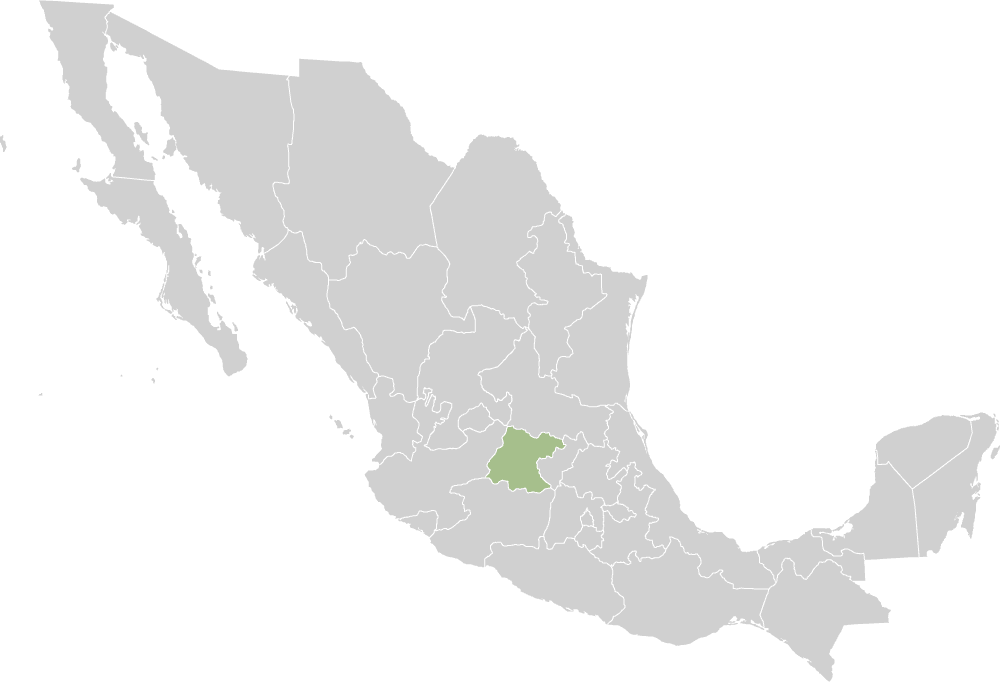
Guanajuato, Mexico

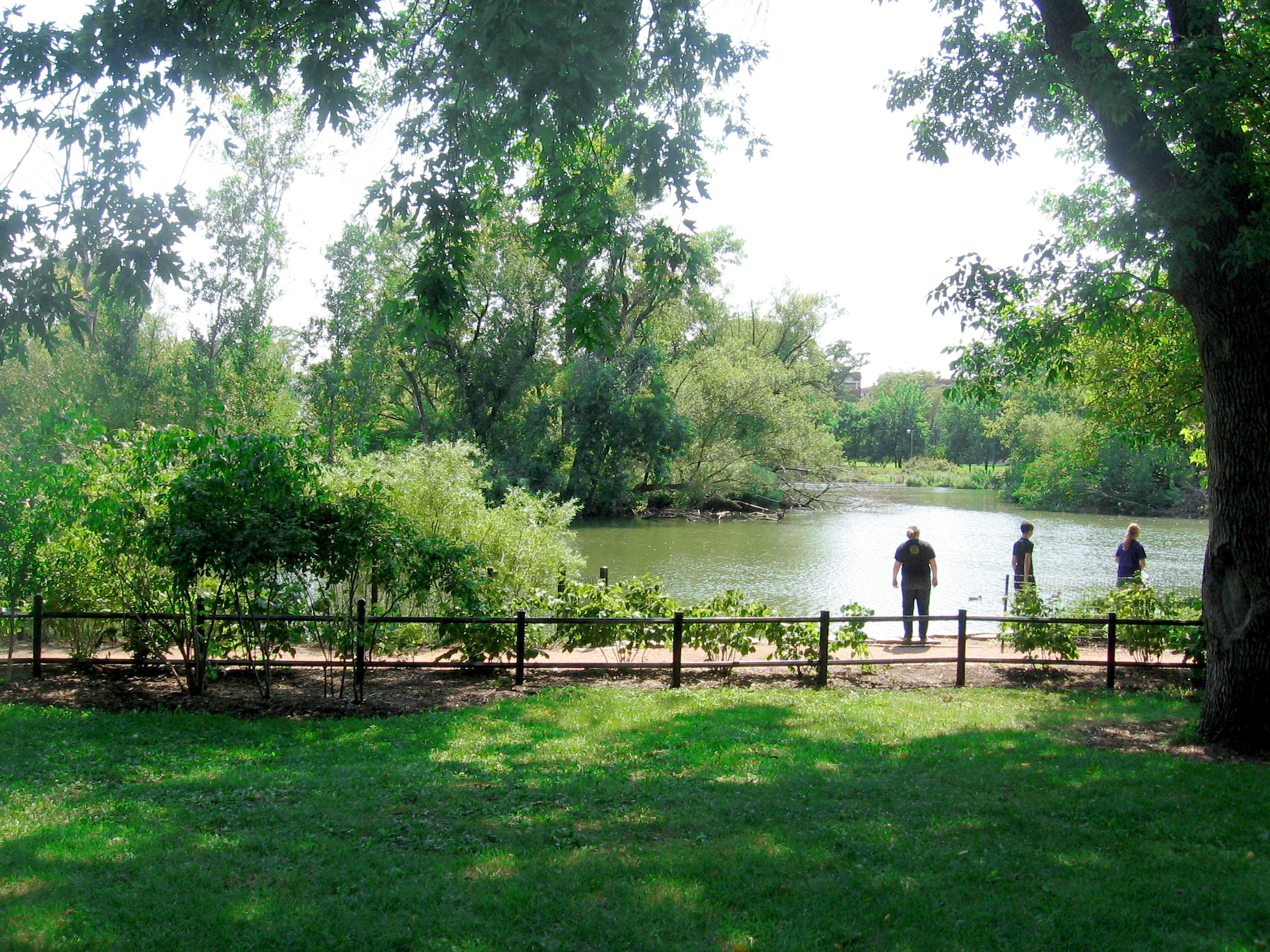
McKinley Park lagoon, Chicago-feeding ducks

Luis Gabriel Aguilera was born in Irapuato, Guanajuato, Mexico. He was smuggled into the United States at six months of age by a coyotaje couple to live with his parents and two siblings in Chicago. The lower middle-class working family resided first in the Humboldt Park neighborhood in the early 1970s, then a mostly lower middle-class Puerto Rican community, and from the mid-1970s in McKinley Park. Aguilera was influenced by the predominantly Polish, Irish, and Italian members of that community while also spending time in the nearby, mostly Mexican-American neighborhoods of Pilsen and Back of the Yards.

Aguilera spent one year at a Spanish-English bilingual public school, Rueben Salazar Elementary Bilingual Center in McKinley Park. He spent the rest of his academic years in private schools, including SS Peter and Paul grade school in. He attended and graduated from Quigley Preparatory Seminary South, a multicultural, all-male Roman Catholic high school, graduating in 1991.^{[4]}

Aguilera completed a Bachelor of Arts degree in Latin American Studies from the University of Chicago in 1995. Aguilera earned his Master of Arts in teaching from National-Louis University in 2009 as part of an accelerated masters program for an alternative certification teachers program for professionals desiring to work in low-income urban schools.

== Author and writer: 2000–present ==
Aguilera is author of a memoir, Gabriel's Fire, published by The University of Chicago Press in April 2000. He has also written on topics like the Iraq War and education matters for Chicago's Spanish-English Extra Bilingual Community newspaper; has written for electronic dance music Zines; and has self-published an essay on corruption in public education.

=== Gabriel's Fire ===
The publisher describes Gabriel's Fire as "not just an account of race relations and street life in the inner city, nor of the plight of the immigrant and the dilemma of class identity for a "minority" family. Gabriel's Fire also movingly recounts the peculiarly daunting and inspiring moments of a particular age, riddled with confusion, desires, and duties and recorded by an exceptionally observant and articulate young man...Both a picture of American culture of the 1980s and 1990s and a coming-of-age story, Gabriel's Fire counters mainstream and mass-mediated images of the inner city, Hispanic culture, and troubled youth..."

Praise for the memoir has come from Mexican-American poet, novelist, journalist, critic, and columnist Luis J. Rodriguez (Always Running: La Vida Loca, Gang Days in L.A.) and now-deceased American writer Piri Thomas (Down These Mean Streets), who both wrote blurbs for the book's jacket.

In The Routledge Companion to Latino/a Literature (edited by Suzanne Bost, Frances R. Aparicio), the editors write: "Aguilera, in Gabriel's Fire (2000), engages the limited success of non-violent party crews as an alternative to gangs. In Aguilera's text, racial tensions in the neighborhood beget violence such that party crews, non-violent youth belonging groups, eventually become part of gangs. For the protagonists of both Aguilera's and Sanchez's texts, housing segregation and restricted economies contour the formation of youth masculinities. The neighborhood binds these men and provides them with few options for productive male identities unless they leave it behind."

American reporter, author, and journalism instructor Kari Lydersen, wrote on June 26, 2000 the following of the work: "Aguilera's book does focus on the intricacies and experiences of a Mexican immigrant growing up in one of Chicago's Latino-Polish neighborhoods. And he isn't afraid to talk about this experience: the culture clash between him and his parents, the economic struggles of immigrants, the racial tension between Latinos and white students in the schools. But the vulnerability Aguilera exposes in his youthful persona allows the book to transcend the token Latino narrative and become an informative and often humorous memoir about a boy growing up."

Lydersen followed up with a more detailed interview with the author for The Chicago Reader: "Luis Aguilera was starting to get upset reading a review of his memoir, Gabriel's Fire, in Publishers Weekly. For one thing, the review said Aguilera was once a gang member, when in fact a central theme of the book is his opposition to gangs and his disappointment when they started recruiting in the electronic "hip-house" music scene that was a mainstay of his late-80s youth. Then Aguilera got to the part of the review that talked about his mother dying. Last he'd checked she was still alive and well, living in the southwest-side neighborhood where he grew up."

== DJ, musician, composer, and music producer: 1986–present ==
=== DJ ===
In his memoir, Aguilera describes his three-point entry into the electronic dance music world at around 12 years of age in 1985 via 1) listening to DJ mix radio programs at home presented by WBMX radio station; 2) frequenting Chicago's now defunct record stores: Loop Records and Importes Etc. in the city's South Loop and Printer's Row area at the time to purchase Disco, House music, Hi-NRG, New Wave, and Industrial music in vinyl format; and 3) the favorable associations made when traveling to the Original Maxwell Street Market and watching break-dancers perform to the sounds of Newcleus' "Jam on It" (1984) with his father at his side. The memoir goes on to explain Aguilera's bedroom DJ status as a teen while a member of an all-male teen Latino youth club, the Ultimate Party Crew.

The rave party circuit provided Aguilera with an outlet and documented footprint for both DJ mix releases and public performances.

=== DJ mix releases ===
Title | Date | Genre | Format

- Galaga | Unknown | Rave | Mixtape
- Live at FS studios | 1999 | Happy hardcore | Mixtape
- Something for the Mind | 2000 | Techno | Mixtape
- Hard/Harder | 2001 | Techno | Mixtape
- Luis Aguilera as LGA | 2001 | Happy hardcore/Mixtape
- Nostrilgic | 2002/2010 | Jungle and Breakbeats | CD/online
- Push Play: Release #1 | 2013 | Tech house and House music/Online

==== Musician, composer, and music producer ====
Aguilera began producing electronic music in 2010. He has produced for musical artist Angel Alanis, his own Full Spectrum label, and Wikimedia Commons. Aguilera has also arranged music for Polish techno producer Michael Kuszynski on his full-length album, Early Collected Works.

== Discography ==
=== Extended plays ===
Year, Title (Label)

- 2012, Little Star – Original Mix (Klientele)
- 2013, Sketches of Pains and Forgiveness EP (Full Spectrum)
- 2017, A New Approach EP (Full Spectrum)
- 2018, Stand Alone EP (Full Spectrum)
- 2018, Containment (Full Spectrum)
- 2018, Resilience EP (Full Spectrum)
- 2019, Three EP (Full Spectrum)

=== Singles ===
Year, Title (Label)

- 2010, Conscious Convergence (Freedom Series Vol. 4)

=== Public domain music for Wikimedia Commons ===
- 2016, You Are Here
- 2016, Moving
- 2016, Seh le na
- 2016, MOS-ART
- 2016, Prep for Joy

== Teaching Career and Lawsuits ==
Aguilera was a high school Spanish language teacher at Bronzeville Scholastic Institute (part of the Chicago Public Schools) when he was fired in 2009. Aguilera claimed that he was fired because of racial and ethnic discrimination and due to the content of his memoir, Gabriel's Fire, which chronicles his experiences as a young Mexican immigrant and details a relationship he had with a teacher while he was a minor, thus violating his First Amendment rights. The Chicago Board of Education maintains that Aguilera was fired for having an inappropriate relationship with a female student.

Aguilera filed a federal lawsuit against The Board of Education of the City of Chicago and respondents and made complaints to the City of Chicago Commission on Human Relations and the Illinois Department of Human Rights. The federal lawsuit was dismissed by summary judgement.

Aguilera was a high school Spanish language teacher from August 2013 to May 2016 at Hammond Academy of Science and Technology. He left teaching in 2016 to pursue his career in music.
