= Hammond Academy =

Hammond Academy may refer to:

- Hammond School (South Carolina), formerly known as Hammond Academy
- Hammond Academy of Science and Technology in Hammond, Indiana
