= Zarghamabad =

Zarghamabad (Persian: ضرغام اباد) may refer to:

- Zarghamabad, Isfahan
- Zarghamabad, Kohgiluyeh and Boyer-Ahmad
