= Hana Rural District (Semirom County) =

Rural district in Isfahan province, Iran

Hana Rural District Persian: دهستان حنا
- Rural District
- Location within Iran
- Coordinates: 31°15′N 51°41′E
- Country: Iran
- Province: Isfahan
- County: Semirom
- District: Central
- Established: 1987
- Capital: Hana

Population (2016)
  - Total: 3,330
- Time zone: UTC+3:30 (IRST)

Hana Rural District (Persian: دهستان حنا) is in the Central District of Semirom County, Isfahan province, Iran. It is administered from the city of Hana.

== Demographics ==
=== Population ===
At the time of the 2006 National Census, the rural district's population was 2,914 in 648 households. There were 2,213 inhabitants in 530 households at the following census of 2011. The 2016 census measured the population of the rural district as 3,330 in 905 households. The most populous of its 67 villages was Gol Afshan, with 1,236 people.

=== Other villages in the rural district ===
- Akhurum
- Cheshmeh Khuni
- Garmuk
- Hast
- Qaleh Sangi
- Qaleh-ye Eslamabad
- Tabaqeh
- Zarghamabad
