= Hyderabad (disambiguation) =

Hyderabad is the capital and largest city of the Indian state of Telangana.

Hyderabad may also refer to:

== India ==
- Hyderabad district, India, a district in the state of Telangana
- Hyderabad State, a pre-1948 princely state ruled by the Nizam in south-central India
- Hyderabad State (1948–1956), a state of Union of India
- Hyderabad, Uttar Pradesh, a village in Uttar Pradesh
- Hyderabad Subah, an administrative division of the Mughal empire

== Pakistan ==
- Hyderabad, Pakistan, a city in the Pakistani province of Sindh
- Hyderabad District, Pakistan, a district in the province of Sindh
- Hyderabad Division, an administrative division within the province of Sindh
- Hyderabad Taluka (rural), an administrative subdivision of Hyderabad District
- Hyderabad City Taluka, an administrative subdivision of Hyderabad District comprising the capital and surrounding areas
- Hyderabad Colony a suburb of Gulshan Town, Karachi, Sindh, Pakistan
- Roman Catholic Diocese of Hyderabad in Pakistan

== Ships ==
- HMS Hyderabad (1917), the only purpose built Q-ship of World War I launched in 1917 and sold in 1920
- HMS Hyderabad (K212), a Flower-class corvette previously HMS Nettle launched in 1941 and sold in 1948

== Other uses ==
- Hyderabad cricket team, a domestic Indian cricket team
- Hyderabad cricket team (Pakistan), a domestic Pakistani cricket team
- Sunrisers Hyderabad, a T20 cricket team in the Indian Premier League
- Handley Page Hyderabad, Royal Air Force bomber of the 1920s

== See also ==
- Hydrabad (ship), an iron cargo and passenger sailing ship with a similar name
- Heydarabad (disambiguation)
- Hyderabad District (disambiguation)
- Hyderabad bombings (disambiguation)
