= Vanak Rural District =

Rural district in Isfahan province, Iran

Vanak Rural District Persian: دهستان ونك
- Rural District
- Location within Iran
- Coordinates: 31°29′N 51°24′E
- Country: Iran
- Province: Isfahan
- County: Semirom
- District: Central
- Established: 1987
- Capital: Vanak

Population (2016)
  - Total: 415
- Time zone: UTC+3:30 (IRST)

Vanak Rural District (Persian: دهستان ونك) is in the Central District of Semirom County, Isfahan province, Iran. It is administered from the city of Vanak.

== Demographics ==
=== Population ===
At the time of the 2006 National Census, the rural district's population was 558 in 120 households. There were 456 inhabitants in 110 households at the following census of 2011. The 2016 census measured the population of the rural district as 415 in 131 households. The most populous of its 26 villages was Qaleh-ye Qadam, with 394 people.
