= Hyderabad bombings =

Hyderabad bombings may refer to:

- 2007 Hyderabad bombings (disambiguation)
  - Makkah Masjid blast
  - August 2007 Hyderabad bombings
- 2013 Hyderabad blasts

== See also ==
- Hyderabad (disambiguation)
