= 2007 Hyderabad bombings =

2007 Hyderabad bombings may refer to these bombings in Hyderabad, India:

- Makkah Masjid blast, 18 May 2007
- August 2007 Hyderabad bombings

== See also ==
- Hyderabad bombings (disambiguation)
