= Vanak, Isfahan =

City in Isfahan province, Iran

Vanak Persian: ونك
- City
- Location within Iran
- Coordinates: 31°31′37″N 51°19′34″E
- Country: Iran
- Province: Isfahan
- County: Semirom
- District: Central
- Established as a city: 1998

Population (2016)
  - Total: 1,665
- Time zone: UTC+3:30 (IRST)

Vanak (Persian: ونك) (Note: Also romanized as Wanak) is a city in the Central District of Semirom County, Isfahan province, Iran, serving as the administrative center for Vanak Rural District. The village of Vanak was converted to a city in 1998.

== Demographics ==
=== Population ===
At the time of the 2006 National Census, the city's population was 2,509 in 653 households. The following census in 2011 counted 1,977 people in 607 households. The 2016 census measured the population of the city as 1,665 people in 576 households.
