= Semirom =

City in Isfahan province, Iran

Semirom Persian: سميرم
- City
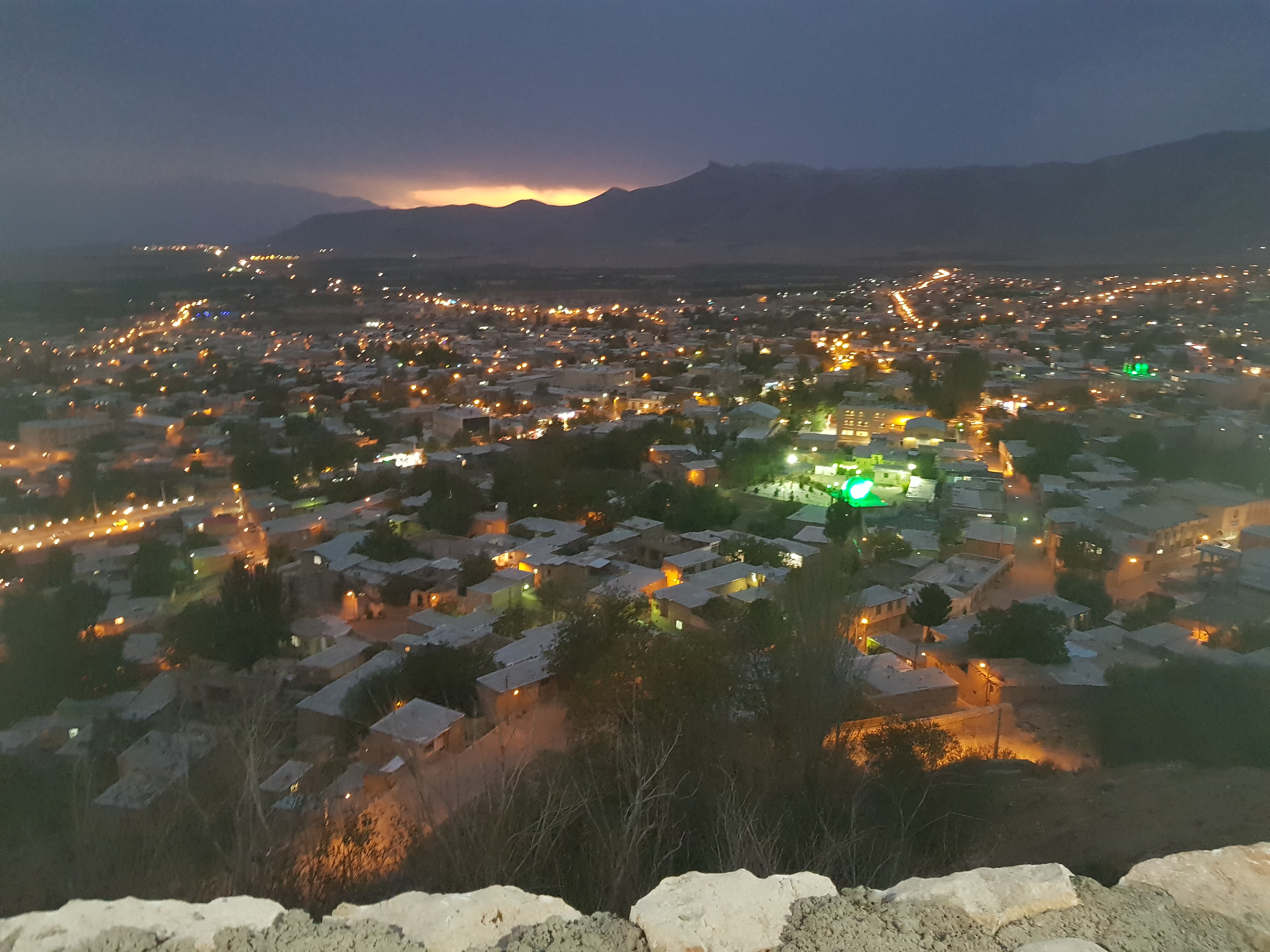
- The city of Semirom

- Location within Iran
- Coordinates: 31°24′34″N 51°34′25″E
- Country: Iran
- Province: Isfahan
- County: Semirom
- District: Central

Population (2016)
  - Total: 26,942
- Time zone: UTC+3:30 (IRST)
- Website: www.semirom.com

Semirom (Persian: سميرم) (Note: Also romanized as Semīrom; also known as Samirum and Sīmrom) is a city in the Central District of Semirom County, Isfahan province, Iran, serving as the capital of both the county and the district.

== Demographics ==
=== Population ===
At the time of the 2006 National Census, the city's population was 26,260 in 6,593 households. The following census in 2011 counted 25,122 people in 7,036 households. The 2016 census measured the population of the city as 26,942 people in 8,304 households.

== Geography ==
=== Location ===
The city of Semirom is located 165 km south of Isfahan and in the eastern foothills of the Zagros mountains. Semirom is located on the steep slopes of Mount Behrez and Mount Siah, in fact, the city of Semirom is surrounded by many mountains.

=== Climate ===
Semirom has a cold semi-arid climate (BSk, according to the Köppen climate classification), with a Mediterranean-influenced hot-summer humid continental climate (Dsa) pattern.

Climate data for Semirom
Month	Jan	Feb	Mar	Apr	May	Jun	Jul	Aug	Sep	Oct	Nov	Dec	Year
Mean daily maximum °C (°F)	4.7 (40.5)	8.1 (46.6)	12.6 (54.7)	17.4 (63.3)	24.1 (75.4)	30.7 (87.3)	33.6 (92.5)	32.5 (90.5)	29.3 (84.7)	22.9 (73.2)	14.6 (58.3)	8.2 (46.8)	19.9 (67.8)
Mean daily minimum °C (°F)	−8.3 (17.1)	−5.0 (23.0)	−1.1 (30.0)	3.1 (37.6)	7.3 (45.1)	11.2 (52.2)	14.6 (58.3)	13.0 (55.4)	8.6 (47.5)	3.7 (38.7)	−0.9 (30.4)	−5.0 (23.0)	3.4 (38.2)
Average precipitation mm (inches)	48 (1.9)	37 (1.5)	39 (1.5)	34 (1.3)	14 (0.6)	1 (0.0)	2 (0.1)	1 (0.0)	0 (0)	3 (0.1)	19 (0.7)	37 (1.5)	235 (9.3)
Source: Climate-data.org

== Agriculture ==
Semirom produces apples. The high altitude of 2,000 meters above sea level gives apples produced in the Semirom region their characteristically sweet taste, aroma and color. Semirom apple had been the target of international research funds to protect and excel its gardens.

== Semirom Riot ==
Unrest started on August 16, 2003, after a decision by the Isfahan Governor General's Office to incorporate the Vardasht district of Semirom into the municipality of Dehaqan provoked the ire of the people of Vardasht. The people staged a demonstration to protest the decision, and the protests turned violent. Eight people were reportedly killed in the violence, including two police officers, and some 150 were injured. Later Hosseini, the governor of Isfahan at the time, in an interview with Shargh newspaper denied any involvement in ordering police to confront the people, and said the number of killed was four.
