= Hana, Iran =

City in Isfahan province, Iran

Hana Persian: حنا
- City
- Location within Iran
- Coordinates: 31°11′52″N 51°43′26″E
- Country: Iran
- Province: Isfahan
- County: Semirom
- District: Central
- Established as a city: 1996

Population (2016)
  - Total: 4,922
- Time zone: UTC+3:30 (IRST)

Hana (Persian: حنا) (Note: Also romanized as Hanā, Ḩannā, and Ḩannā’) is a city in the Central District of Semirom County, Isfahan province, Iran, serving as the administrative center for Hana Rural District. The village of Hana was converted to a city in 1996.

== Demographics ==
=== Population ===
At the time of the 2006 National Census, the city's population was 5,358 in 1,335 households. The following census in 2011 counted 5,354 people in 1,507 households. The 2016 census measured the population of the city as 4,922 people in 1,528 households.
