= Heydarabad, Neyriz =

Heydarabad حيدراباد
- Village
- Location within Iran
- Coordinates: 29°13′35″N 54°12′59″E
- Country: Iran
- Province: Fars
- County: Neyriz
- Bakhsh: Central
- Rural District: Rostaq

Population (2006)
  - Total: 293
- Time zone: UTC+3:30 (IRST)
  - Summer (DST): UTC+4:30 (IRDT)

Heydarabad (Persian: حيدراباد, also romanized as Ḩeydarābād and Heidar Abad) is a village in Rostaq Rural District, in the Central District of Neyriz County, Fars province, Iran. At the 2006 census, its population was 293, in 65 families.
