= Hormozabad, Baraan-e Jonubi =

Hormozabad هرمزاباد
- Village
- Location within Iran
- Coordinates: 32°28′42″N 51°51′54″E
- Country: Iran
- Province: Isfahan
- County: Isfahan
- Bakhsh: Central
- Rural District: Baraan-e Jonubi

Population (2006)
  - Total: 142
- Time zone: UTC+3:30 (IRST)
  - Summer (DST): UTC+4:30 (IRDT)

Hormozabad (Persian: هرمزاباد, also Romanized as Hormozābād) is a village in Baraan-e Jonubi Rural District, in the Central District of Isfahan County, Isfahan Province, Iran. At the 2006 census, its population was 142, in 41 families.
