= Hormozabad, West Azerbaijan =

Hormozabad هرمزاباد
- Village
- Location within Iran
- Coordinates: 36°13′51″N 45°33′13″E
- Country: Iran
- Province: West Azerbaijan
- County: Sardasht
- Bakhsh: Central
- Rural District: Gavork-e Sardasht

Population (2006)
  - Total: 85
- Time zone: UTC+3:30 (IRST)
  - Summer (DST): UTC+4:30 (IRDT)

Hormozabad (Persian: هرمزاباد, also Romanized as Hormozābād) is a village in Gavork-e Sardasht Rural District, in the Central District of Sardasht County, West Azerbaijan Province, Iran. At the 2006 census, its population was 85, in 13 families.
