= Heydarabad, Hormozgan =

Heydarabad حيدرآباد
- Village
- Country: Iran
- Province: Hormozgan
- County: Bashagard
- Bakhsh: Gafr and Parmon
- Rural District: Gafr and Parmon

Population (2006)
  - Total: 119
- Time zone: UTC+3:30 (IRST)
  - Summer (DST): UTC+4:30 (IRDT)

Heydarabad (Persian: حيدرآباد, also Romanized as Ḩeydarābād) is a village in Gafr and Parmon Rural District, Gafr and Parmon District, Bashagard County, Hormozgan province, Iran. At the 2006 census, its population was 119, in 25 families.
