= Heydarabad-e Meyheh =

Heydarabad-e Meyheh حيدرابادميهه
- Village
- Location within Iran
- Coordinates: 32°23′54″N 50°21′52″E
- Country: Iran
- Province: Chaharmahal and Bakhtiari
- County: Kuhrang
- Bakhsh: Central
- Rural District: Dasht-e Zarrin

Population (2006)
  - Total: 181
- Time zone: UTC+3:30 (IRST)
  - Summer (DST): UTC+4:30 (IRDT)

Heydarabad-e Meyheh (Persian: حيدرابادميهه, also Romanized as Ḩeydarābād-e Meyheh) is a village in Dasht-e Zarrin Rural District, in the Central District of Kuhrang County, Chaharmahal and Bakhtiari Province, Iran. At the 2006 census, its population was 181, in 40 families. The village is populated by Lurs.
