= Heydarabad-e Tang Seh Riz =

Heydarabad-e Tang Seh Riz حيدرابادتنگ سه ريز
- Village
- Country: Iran
- Province: Kohgiluyeh and Boyer-Ahmad
- County: Boyer-Ahmad
- Bakhsh: Central
- Rural District: Sarrud-e Shomali

Population (2006)
  - Total: 53
- Time zone: UTC+3:30 (IRST)
  - Summer (DST): UTC+4:30 (IRDT)

Heydarabad-e Tang Seh Riz (Persian: حيدرابادتنگ سه ريز, also Romanized as Ḩeydarābād-e Tang Seh Rīz) is a village in Sarrud-e Shomali Rural District, in the Central District of Boyer-Ahmad County, Kohgiluyeh and Boyer-Ahmad Province, Iran. At the 2006 census, its population was 53, in 13 families.
