= Heydarabad, Yazd =

Heydarabad حيدراباد
- Village
- Location within Iran
- Coordinates: 31°28′04″N 53°56′24″E
- Country: Iran
- Province: Yazd
- County: Taft
- Bakhsh: Nir
- Rural District: Banadkuk

Population (2006)
  - Total: 105
- Time zone: UTC+3:30 (IRST)
  - Summer (DST): UTC+4:30 (IRDT)

Heydarabad (Persian: حيدراباد, also Romanized as Ḩeydarābād and Heydarābād; also known as Bāgh-e Sohrāb) is a village in Banadkuk Rural District, Nir District, Taft County, Yazd province, Iran. At the 2006 census, its population was 105, in 40 families.
