= Heydarabad, Shahin Dezh =

Heydarabad حيدراباد
- Village
- Location within Iran
- Coordinates: 36°49′22″N 46°27′06″E
- Country: Iran
- Province: West Azerbaijan
- County: Shahin Dezh
- Bakhsh: Keshavarz
- Rural District: Keshavarz

Population (2006)
  - Total: 41
- Time zone: UTC+3:30 (IRST)
  - Summer (DST): UTC+4:30 (IRDT)

Heydarabad (Persian: حيدراباد, also Romanized as Ḩeydarābād) is a village in Keshavarz Rural District, Keshavarz District, Shahin Dezh County, West Azerbaijan province, Iran. At the 2006 census, its population was 41, in 14 families.
