= Dalek Dash, West Azerbaijan =

Dalek Dash دلك داش
- Village
- Location within Iran
- Coordinates: 36°58′30″N 45°55′11″E
- Country: Iran
- Province: West Azerbaijan
- County: Miandoab
- Bakhsh: Central
- Rural District: Mokriyan-e Shomali

Population (2006)
  - Total: 335
- Time zone: UTC+3:30 (IRST)
  - Summer (DST): UTC+4:30 (IRDT)

Dalek Dash (Persian: دلك داش, also Romanized as Dalek Dāsh; also known as Dalīk Dāsh and Dalik Dasht) is a village in Mokriyan-e Shomali Rural District, in the Central District of Miandoab County, West Azerbaijan Province, Iran. At the 2006 census, its population was 335, in 74 families.
