= Haidarabad, Bangladesh =

Haidarabad হায়দরাবাদ
- Village
- Location within Bangladesh
- Coordinates: 23.7611°N 91.0234°E
- Country: Bangladesh
- Division: Chittagong
- District: Comilla
- Upzilla: Muradnagar Upazila
- Union: Andicot

Population (2013)
  - Total: 4,463
- Time zone: UTC+06:00 (BST)

Haidarabad (Bengali: হায়দরাবাদ) is a village and large market place in Bangladesh. It is situated in Andicot Union, Muradnagar Upazila, Comilla District of the Chittagong Division. Approximately 4463 people live in Haidarabad.

== Education ==
There are six educational institutions in Haidarabad. They are Haidarabad Hazi E. A. B. High School,

== Public offices ==
The economical importance and convenient communication with comilla city make Haidarabad one of the significant place in the region. This is why it has several important public offices like Andicot Union council office and Regional agricultural center is situated here.
