= Sar Cheqa, Kermanshah =

Sar Cheqa سرچقا
- Village
- Location within Iran
- Coordinates: 34°13′58″N 46°13′57″E
- Country: Iran
- Province: Kermanshah
- County: Dalahu
- Bakhsh: Central
- Rural District: Howmeh-ye Kerend

Population (2006)
  - Total: 361
- Time zone: UTC+3:30 (IRST)
  - Summer (DST): UTC+4:30 (IRDT)

Sar Cheqa (Persian: سرچقا, also Romanized as Sar Cheqā; also known as Sar Cheqeh and Sar Choqā Karand) is a village in Howmeh-ye Kerend Rural District, in the Central District of Dalahu County, Kermanshah Province, Iran. At the 2006 census, its population was 361, in 66 families.
