= Heydarabad-e Sofla =

Heydarabad-e Sofla حيدراباد سفلي
- Village
- Location within Iran
- Coordinates: 30°55′38″N 50°54′25″E
- Country: Iran
- Province: Kohgiluyeh and Boyer-Ahmad
- County: Boyer-Ahmad
- Bakhsh: Ludab
- Rural District: Ludab

Population (2006)
  - Total: 426
- Time zone: UTC+3:30 (IRST)
  - Summer (DST): UTC+4:30 (IRDT)

Heydarabad-e Sofla (Persian: حيدراباد سفلي, also Romanized as Ḩeydarābād-e Soflá; also known as Ḩeydarābād) is a village in Ludab Rural District, Ludab District, Boyer-Ahmad County, Kohgiluyeh and Boyer-Ahmad Province, Iran. At the 2006 census, its population was 426, in 97 families.
