= Heydarabad, Harsin =

Heydarabad حيدراباد
- Village
- Location within Iran
- Coordinates: 34°26′03″N 47°27′09″E
- Country: Iran
- Province: Kermanshah
- County: Harsin
- Bakhsh: Bisotun
- Rural District: Cham Chamal

Population (2006)
  - Total: 259
- Time zone: UTC+3:30 (IRST)
  - Summer (DST): UTC+4:30 (IRDT)

Heydarabad (Persian: حيدراباد, also Romanized as Ḩeydarābād and Haidarabad; also known as Haryilābād) is a village in Cham Chamal Rural District, Bisotun District, Harsin County, Kermanshah province, Iran. At the 2006 census, its population was 259, in 59 families.
