= Heydarabad, Shiraz =

Heydarabad حيدراباد
- Village
- Location within Iran
- Coordinates: 29°47′18″N 52°16′01″E
- Country: Iran
- Province: Fars
- County: Shiraz
- Bakhsh: Arzhan
- Rural District: Qarah Chaman

Population (2006)
  - Total: 52
- Time zone: UTC+3:30 (IRST)
  - Summer (DST): UTC+4:30 (IRDT)

Heydarabad (Persian: حيدراباد, also Romanized as Ḩeydarābād) is a village in Qarah Chaman Rural District, Arzhan District, Shiraz County, Fars province, Iran. At the 2006 census, its population was 52, in 12 families.
