= Heydarabad-e Olya =

Heydarabad-e Olya حيدرابادعليا
- Village
- Location within Iran
- Coordinates: 30°54′55″N 50°54′02″E
- Country: Iran
- Province: Kohgiluyeh and Boyer-Ahmad
- County: Boyer-Ahmad
- Bakhsh: Ludab
- Rural District: Ludab

Population (2006)
  - Total: 430
- Time zone: UTC+3:30 (IRST)
  - Summer (DST): UTC+4:30 (IRDT)

Heydarabad-e Olya (Persian: حيدرابادعليا, also Romanized as Ḩeydarābād-e ‘Olyā) is a village in Ludab Rural District, Ludab District, Boyer-Ahmad County, Kohgiluyeh and Boyer-Ahmad Province, Iran. At the 2006 census, its population was 430, in 88 families.
