= Sar Choqa, Ilam =

Sar Choqa سرچقا
- Village
- Location within Iran
- Coordinates: 33°38′12″N 46°50′52″E
- Country: Iran
- Province: Ilam
- County: Chardavol
- Bakhsh: Zagros
- Rural District: Bijnavand

Population (2006)
  - Total: 70
- Time zone: UTC+3:30 (IRST)
  - Summer (DST): UTC+4:30 (IRDT)

Sar Choqa (Persian: سرچقا, also Romanized as Sar Choqā; also known as Sar Choghā Chālāb Zard and Sar Choqā Chālāb Zard) is a village in Bijnavand Rural District, in the Zagros District of Chardavol County, Ilam Province, Iran. At the 2006 census, its population was 70, in 11 families. The village is populated by Kurds.
