= Sar Chaqa =

Sar Chaqa سرچغا
- Village
- Location within Iran
- Coordinates: 33°58′12″N 48°57′55″E
- Country: Iran
- Province: Lorestan
- County: Borujerd
- Bakhsh: Central
- Rural District: Darreh Seydi

Population (2006)
  - Total: 54
- Time zone: UTC+3:30 (IRST)
  - Summer (DST): UTC+4:30 (IRDT)

Sar Chaqa (Persian: سرچغا, also Romanized as Sar Chaqā, Sar Choghā, Sar Choqā, and Sarchūqāh) is a village in Darreh Seydi Rural District, in the Central District of Borujerd County, Lorestan Province, Iran. At the 2006 census, its population was 54, in 16 families.
