= Karimabad-e Seyyed Ali Khamenehi =

Karimabad-e Seyyed Ali Khamenehi كريم ابادسيدعلي خامنه اي
- Village
- Location within Iran
- Coordinates: 28°20′10″N 61°18′51″E
- Country: Iran
- Province: Sistan and Baluchestan
- County: Khash
- Bakhsh: Central
- Rural District: Poshtkuh

Population (2006)
  - Total: 793
- Time zone: UTC+3:30 (IRST)
  - Summer (DST): UTC+4:30 (IRDT)

Karimabad-e Seyyed Ali Khamenehi (Persian: كريم ابادسيدعلي خامنه اي, also Romanized as Karīmābād-e Seyyed ʿAlī Khāmeneh’ī; also known as Ḩeydarābād and Karīmābād) is a village in Poshtkuh Rural District, in the Central District of Khash County, Sistan and Baluchestan province, Iran. At the 2006 census, its population was 793, in 145 families.
