= Heydarabad, Bardsir =

Heydarabad حيدراباد
- Village
- Location within Iran
- Coordinates: 29°54′13″N 56°40′33″E
- Country: Iran
- Province: Kerman
- County: Bardsir
- Bakhsh: Central
- Rural District: Mashiz

Population (2006)
  - Total: 72
- Time zone: UTC+3:30 (IRST)
  - Summer (DST): UTC+4:30 (IRDT)

Heydarabad (Persian: حيدراباد, also Romanized as Ḩeydarābād; also known as Khairābād, Kheir Abad, and Kheyrābād) is a village in Mashiz Rural District, in the Central District of Bardsir County, Kerman province, Iran. At the 2006 census, its population was 72, in 18 families.
