= Heydarabad, Sarab =

Heydarabad حيدراباد
- Village
- Location within Iran
- Coordinates: 38°06′07″N 47°48′41″E
- Country: Iran
- Province: East Azerbaijan
- County: Sarab
- Bakhsh: Central
- Rural District: Sain

Population (2006)
  - Total: 47
- Time zone: UTC+3:30 (IRST)
  - Summer (DST): UTC+4:30 (IRDT)

Heydarabad (Persian: حيدراباد, also Romanized as Ḩeydarābād) is a village in Sain Rural District, in the Central District of Sarab County, East Azerbaijan Province, Iran. At the 2006 census, its population was 47, in 8 families.
