= Heydarabad-e Sohrab =

Heydarabad-e Sohrab حيدرابادسهراب
- Village
- Country: Iran
- Province: Kerman
- County: Shahr-e Babak
- Bakhsh: Central
- Rural District: Estabraq

Population (2006)
  - Total: 115
- Time zone: UTC+3:30 (IRST)
  - Summer (DST): UTC+4:30 (IRDT)

Heydarabad-e Sohrab (Persian: حيدرابادسهراب, also romanized as Ḩeydarābād-e Sohrāb) is a village in Estabraq Rural District, in the Central District of Shahr-e Babak County, Kerman Province, Iran. At the 2006 census, its population was 115, in 28 families.
