= Haderbad-e Olya =

Haderbad-e Olya هادربادعليا
- Village
- Location within Iran
- Coordinates: 33°07′38″N 59°25′42″E
- Country: Iran
- Province: South Khorasan
- County: Birjand
- Bakhsh: Central
- Rural District: Alqurat

Population (2006)
  - Total: 76
- Time zone: UTC+3:30 (IRST)
  - Summer (DST): UTC+4:30 (IRDT)

Haderbad-e Olya (Persian: هادربادعليا, also Romanized as Hāderbād-e ‘Olyā; also known as Hāderbād, Hāderābād, Haidarābād, and Ḩeydarābād) is a village in Alqurat Rural District, in the Central District of Birjand County, South Khorasan province, Iran. At the 2006 census, its population was 76, in 21 families.
