= Baqeriyeh-ye Bala =

Baqeriyeh-ye Bala باقريه بالا
- Village
- Location within Iran
- Coordinates: 28°53′21″N 58°45′12″E
- Country: Iran
- Province: Kerman
- County: Fahraj
- Bakhsh: Central
- Rural District: Borj-e Akram

Population (2006)
  - Total: 493
- Time zone: UTC+3:30 (IRST)
  - Summer (DST): UTC+4:30 (IRDT)

Baqeriyeh-ye Bala (Persian: باقريه بالا, also Romanized as Bāqerīyeh-ye Bālā; also known as Bāgerīyeh, Bāqerīyeh, Haidārābād, and Ḩeydarābād) is a village in Borj-e Akram Rural District, in the Central District of Fahraj County, Kerman Province, Iran. At the 2006 census, its population was 493, in 122 families.
