= Cheshmeh Qanbar, Kermanshah =

Cheshmeh Qanbar چشمه قنبر
- Village
- Location within Iran
- Coordinates: 34°36′44″N 47°19′42″E
- Country: Iran
- Province: Kermanshah
- County: Sahneh
- Bakhsh: Dinavar
- Rural District: Kanduleh

Population (2006)
  - Total: 85
- Time zone: UTC+3:30 (IRST)
  - Summer (DST): UTC+4:30 (IRDT)

Cheshmeh Qanbar (Persian: چشمه قنبر) is a village in Kanduleh Rural District, Dinavar District, Sahneh County, Kermanshah Province, Iran. At the 2006 census, its population was 85, in 23 families.
