= Heydarabad, Shahr-e Babak =

Heydarabad حيدراباد
- Village
- Location within Iran
- Coordinates: 30°03′13″N 55°11′57″E
- Country: Iran
- Province: Kerman
- County: Shahr-e Babak
- Bakhsh: Central
- Rural District: Estabraq

Population (2006)
  - Total: 53
- Time zone: UTC+3:30 (IRST)
  - Summer (DST): UTC+4:30 (IRDT)

Heydarabad (Persian: حيدراباد, also romanized as Ḩeydarābād) is a village in Estabraq Rural District, in the Central District of Shahr-e Babak County, Kerman Province, Iran. At the 2006 census, its population was 53, in 14 families.
