= Heydarabad, Fasa =

Heydarabad حيدراباد
- Village
- Location within Iran
- Coordinates: 29°13′43″N 53°29′54″E
- Country: Iran
- Province: Fars
- County: Fasa
- Bakhsh: Central
- Rural District: Jangal

Population (2006)
  - Total: 141
- Time zone: UTC+3:30 (IRST)
  - Summer (DST): UTC+4:30 (IRDT)

Heydarabad (Persian: حيدراباد, also Romanized as Ḩeydarābād) is a village in Jangal Rural District, in the Central District of Fasa County, Farsa province, Iran. At the 2006 census, its population was 141, in 30 families.
