= Heydərabad =

- Location within Azerbaijan
- Coordinates: 39°51′24″N 48°24′41″E
- Country: Azerbaijan
- Rayon: Saatly

Population
  - Total: 685
- Time zone: UTC+4 (AZT)
  - Summer (DST): UTC+5 (AZT)

Heydərabad (known as Golovinovka until 1999) is a village and municipality in the Saatly Rayon of Azerbaijan. According to the decision of the Milli Majlis of the Republic of Azerbaijan dated October 5, 1999, Dadli Gorgud village administrative-territorial unit of Saatli region was named Golovinovka village of Heydarabad.

== Description ==
It has a population of 685.
