= Heydarabad-e Marali =

Heydarabad-e Marali حيدرآباد مرالي
- Village
- Location within Iran
- Coordinates: 34°10′27″N 47°54′59″E
- Country: Iran
- Province: Lorestan
- County: Delfan
- Bakhsh: Central
- Rural District: Nurali

Population (2006)
  - Total: 155
- Time zone: UTC+3:30 (IRST)
  - Summer (DST): UTC+4:30 (IRDT)

Heydarabad-e Marali (Persian: حيدرآباد مرالي, also Romanized as Ḩeydarābād-e Marālī) is a village in Nurali Rural District, in the Central District of Delfan County, Lorestan Province, Iran. At the 2006 census, its population was 155, in 34 families.
