= Heydarabad, Anbarabad =

Heydarabad حيدراباد
- Village
- Location within Iran
- Coordinates: 28°15′01″N 57°38′00″E
- Country: Iran
- Province: Kerman
- County: Anbarabad
- Bakhsh: Esmaili
- Rural District: Ganjabad

Population (2006)
  - Total: 820
- Time zone: UTC+3:30 (IRST)
  - Summer (DST): UTC+4:30 (IRDT)

Heydarabad (Persian: حيدراباد, also Romanized as Ḩeydarābād; also known as Heidar Abad Kahnooj, Ḩeydarābād-e Kahnūj, and Ḩeydarābād-e Soflá) is a village in Ganjabad Rural District, Esmaili District, Anbarabad County, Kerman province, Iran. According to the 2006 census, its population was 820, residing in 162 families.
