= Heydarabad-e Chah Narenj =

Heydarabad-e Chah Narenj حيدرابادچاه نارنج
- Village
- Location within Iran
- Coordinates: 28°10′25″N 57°23′19″E
- Country: Iran
- Province: Kerman
- County: Faryab
- Bakhsh: Central
- Rural District: Hur

Population (2006)
  - Total: 835
- Time zone: UTC+3:30 (IRST)
  - Summer (DST): UTC+4:30 (IRDT)

Heydarabad-e Chah Narenj (Persian: حيدرابادچاه نارنج, also Romanized as Ḩeydarābād-e Chāh Nārenj; also known as Heidar Abad Kahnooj and Ḩeydarābād) is a village in Hur Rural District, in the Central District of Faryab County, Kerman Province, Iran. At the 2006 census, its population was 835, in 169 families.
