= Heydarabad-e Saki =

Heydarabad-e Saki حيدرابادساكي
- Village
- Location within Iran
- Coordinates: 33°51′37″N 48°18′14″E
- Country: Iran
- Province: Lorestan
- County: Selseleh
- Bakhsh: Central
- Rural District: Qaleh-ye Mozaffari

Population (2006)
  - Total: 112
- Time zone: UTC+3:30 (IRST)
  - Summer (DST): UTC+4:30 (IRDT)

Heydarabad-e Saki (Persian: حيدرابادساكي, also Romanized as Ḩeydarābād-e Sākī; also known as Ḩeydarābād-e Cheshmeh Barqī and Ḩeydarābād) is a village in Qaleh-ye Mozaffari Rural District, in the Central District of Selseleh County, Lorestan Province, Iran. At the 2006 census, its population was 112, in 23 families.
