= Heydarabad-e Chenareh =

Heydarabad-e Chenareh حيدرابادچناره
- Village
- Location within Iran
- Coordinates: 33°54′25″N 48°13′24″E
- Country: Iran
- Province: Lorestan
- County: Selseleh
- Bakhsh: Central
- Rural District: Yusefvand

Population (2006)
  - Total: 130
- Time zone: UTC+3:30 (IRST)
  - Summer (DST): UTC+4:30 (IRDT)

Heydarabad-e Chenareh (Persian: حيدرابادچناره, also Romanized as Ḩeydarābād-e Chenāreh) is a village in Yusefvand Rural District, in the Central District of Selseleh County, Lorestan Province, Iran. At the 2006 census, its population was 130, in 31 families.
