= Hammond Academy of Science and Technology =

Public charter school in Hammond, Indiana, US

- HAST

Location
- 33 Muenich Court Hammond, IN, 46320; Hammond, Indiana, IN; United States
- 41.617982°N 87.523509°W

Information
- Established: 2010
- Status: Public Charter School
- Grades: 6-12
- Color
- Mascot: Hawk
- Nickname: Hawks
- Affiliations: Calumet College of St. Joseph, Purdue University Northwest, Indiana University Northwest
- Emblem: Hawk
- Website: hammondacademy.org/

Hammond Academy of Science and Technology (HAST) is a charter school located in Hammond, Indiana. This school focuses on science and technology with a heavy emphasis on a small teacher-to-student ratio. HAST is both a high school and middle school including grades 6–12.

The mission of the Hammond Academy of Science and Technology is to provide the highest quality level of education to students by implementing state-of-the-art technology and research-based instruction in an environment that is conducive to learning.

Enrollment for incoming 6th graders begins the year before (their 5th grade year) with applications being accepted early September through mid-January. If more applications are received than spaces available, students will be selected using a lottery system. Admittance for all other grade levels is based on a waitlist.
