= Vardasht Rural District =

Rural district in Isfahan province, Iran

Vardasht Rural District Persian: دهستان وردشت
- Rural District
- Location within Iran
- Coordinates: 31°43′N 51°31′E
- Country: Iran
- Province: Isfahan
- County: Semirom
- District: Vardasht
- Established: 1987
- Capital: Varaq

Population (2016)
  - Total: 6,142
- Time zone: UTC+3:30 (IRST)

Vardasht Rural District (Persian: دهستان وردشت) is in Vardasht District of Semirom County, Isfahan province, Iran. Its capital is the village of Varaq. The previous capital of the rural district was the village of Fathabad.

== Demographics ==
=== Population ===
At the time of the 2006 National Census, the rural district's population (as a part of the Central District) was 9,936 in 2,304 households. There were 8,111 inhabitants in 2,172 households at the following census of 2011. The 2016 census measured the population of the rural district as 6,142 in 1,819 households, by which time it had been separated from the district in the formation of Vardasht District. The most populous of its 62 villages was Fathabad, with 2,023 people.

=== Other villages in the rural district ===
- Aliabad
- Aliabad-e Deh Kord
- Amirabad
- Band-e Karim Khani
- Cheshmeh Qanbar
- Cheshmeh Rahman
- Cheshmeh Sard
- Deh-e Ashuri
- Dehkord
- Doba Arab
- Eslamabad
- Heydarabad
- Heydarabad-e Ali Mardani
- Heydarabad-e Qur Tapasi
- Hormozabad
- Hoseynabad
- Kakaabad-e Olya
- Kand-e Qabrestan
- Kasegan-e Sofla
- Mehdiabad
- Mehrabad
- Muruk
- Nazarabad
- Nesar Abbas
- Pirasafneh
- Saadatabad
- Sar Choqa-ye Olya
- Sar Choqa-ye Sofla
- Sarmeydan
- Siah Kalak
- Tall Armeni
- Tall Changi-ye Sofla
- Tall Kharowsi
