= Vardasht District =

District in Isfahan province, Iran

Vardasht District Persian: بخش وردشت
- District
- Location within Iran
- Coordinates: 31°38′N 51°31′E
- Country: Iran
- Province: Isfahan
- County: Semirom
- Established: 2012
- Capital: Fathabad

Population (2016)
  - Total: 9,941
- Time zone: UTC+3:30 (IRST)

Vardasht District (Persian: بخش وردشت) is in Semirom County, Isfahan province, Iran. Its capital is the village of Fathabad.

== History ==
In 2012, Vardasht Rural District was separated from the Central District in the formation of Vardasht District.

== Demographics ==
=== Population ===
At the time of the 2016 National Census, the district's population was 9,941 inhabitants in 2,980 households.

=== Administrative divisions ===
Vardasht District Population
Administrative Divisions	2016
Darrehshur RD	3,799
Vardasht RD	6,142
Total	9,941
RD = Rural District
