= Semirom County =

County in Isfahan province, Iran

Semirom County Persian: شهرستان سمیرم
- County
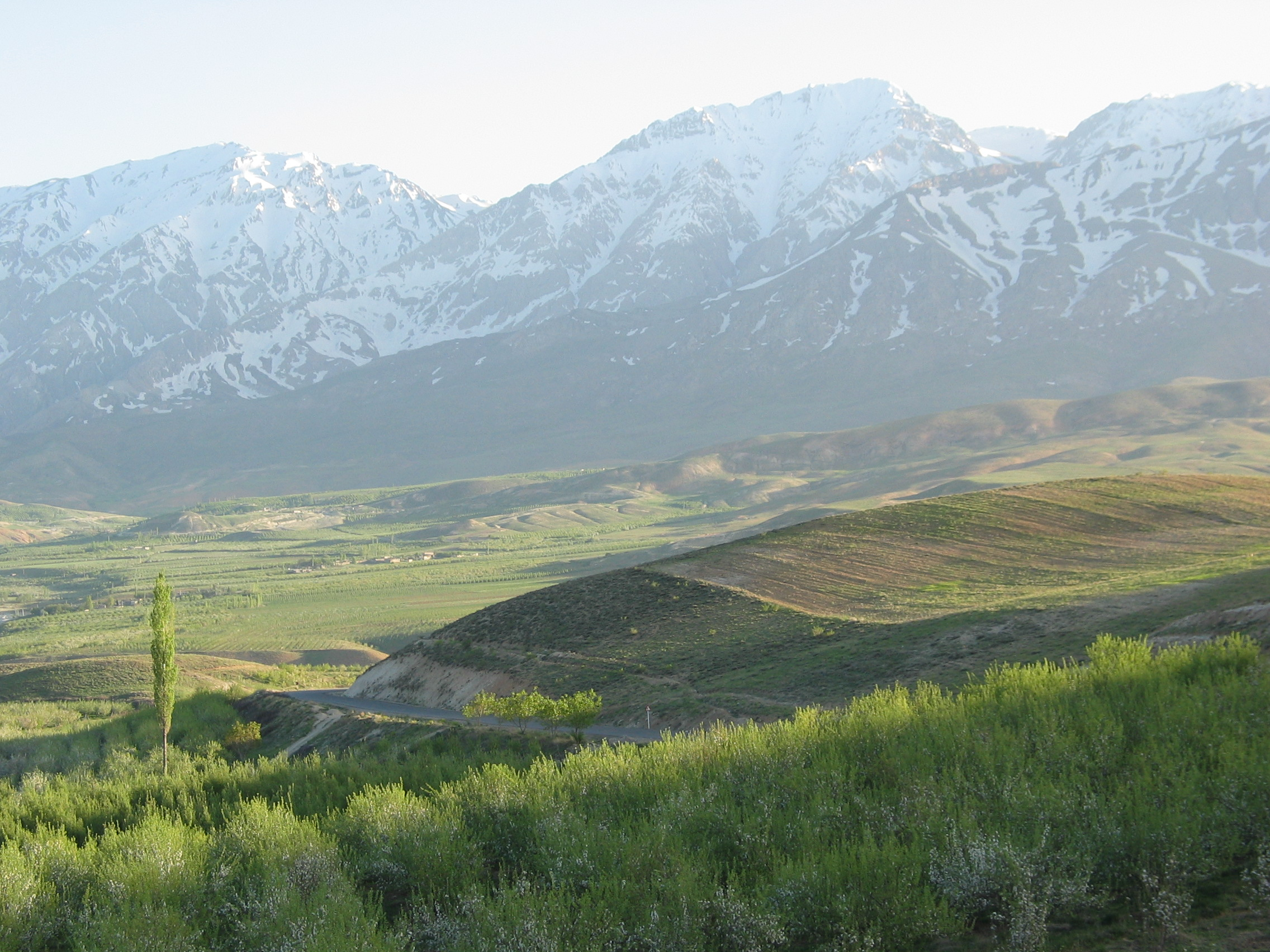
- Mount Dena in Padena District

- Location of Semirom County in Isfahan province (bottom, green)

- Location of Isfahan province in Iran
- Coordinates: 31°14′N 51°37′E
- Country: Iran
- Province: Isfahan
- Capital: Semirom
- Districts: Central, Padena, Padena-ye Olya, Vardasht

Population (2016)
  - Total: 74,109
- Time zone: UTC+3:30 (IRST)

Semirom County (Persian: شهرستان سمیرم) is in Isfahan province, Iran. Its capital is the city of Semirom.

== History ==
In 2012, Vardasht Rural District was separated from the Central District in the formation of Vardasht District, including the new Darreh Shur Rural District. Padena-ye Olya Rural District was separated from Padena District to form Danakuh District, (Note: Renamed Padena-ye Olya District) including the new Bar Aftab Rural District.

== Demographics ==
=== Population ===
At the time of the 2006 National Census, the county's population was 70,735 in 17,072 households. The following census in 2011 counted 65,047 people in 18,062 households. The 2016 census measured the population of the county as 74,109 in 22,530 households.

=== Administrative divisions ===
Semirom County's population history and administrative structure over three consecutive censuses are shown in the following table.

Semirom County Population
Administrative Divisions	2006	2011	2016
Central District	47,535	43,233	37,274
Hana RD	2,914	2,213	3,330
Vanak RD	558	456	415
Vardasht RD	9,936	8,111	
Hana (city)	5,358	5,354	4,922
Semirom (city)	26,260	25,122	26,942
Vanak (city)	2,509	1,977	1,665
Padena District	23,200	21,733	13,696
Padena-ye Olya RD	9,844	9,589	
Padena-ye Sofla RD	5,616	5,161	6,193
Padena-ye Vosta RD	5,435	4,837	5,319
Komeh (city)	2,305	2,146	2,184
Padena-ye Olya District (Note: Formerly Danakuh District)			12,855
Baraftab RD			5,104
Padena-ye Olya RD			7,751
Vardasht District			9,941
Darrehshur RD			3,799
Vardasht RD			6,142
Total	70,735	65,047	74,109
RD = Rural District

== See also ==
Media related to Semirom County at Wikimedia Commons
