= Central District (Semirom County) =

District in Isfahan province, Iran

Central District (Semirom County) Persian: بخش مرکزی شهرستان سمیرم
- District
- Location within Iran
- Coordinates: 31°20′N 51°37′E
- Country: Iran
- Province: Isfahan
- County: Semirom
- Capital: Semirom

Population (2016)
  - Total: 37,274
- Time zone: UTC+3:30 (IRST)

The Central District of Semirom County (Persian: بخش مرکزی شهرستان سمیرم) is in Isfahan province, Iran. Its capital is the city of Semirom.

== History ==
In 2012, Vardasht Rural District was separated from the district in the formation of Vardasht District.

== Demographics ==
=== Population ===
At the time of the 2006 National Census, the district's population was 47,535 in 11,653 households. The following census in 2011 counted 43,233 people in 11,962 households. The 2016 census measured the population of the district as 37,274 inhabitants in 11,444 households.

=== Administrative divisions ===
Central District (Semirom County) Population
Administrative Divisions	2006	2011	2016
Hana RD	2,914	2,213	3,330
Vanak RD	558	456	415
Vardasht RD (Note: Transferred to Vardasht District)	9,936	8,111	
Hana (city)	5,358	5,354	4,922
Semirom (city)	26,260	25,122	26,942
Vanak (city)	2,509	1,977	1,665
Total	47,535	43,233	37,274
RD = Rural District
