= Ganjegan =

Ganjegan or Ganjgan (Persian: گنجگان) may refer to:

- Ganjgan, Fars
- Ganjegan, Isfahan
- Ganjegan-e Olya, Kohgiluyeh and Boyer-Ahmad Province
- Ganjegan-e Sofla, Kohgiluyeh and Boyer-Ahmad Province
