= Padena =

Padena (Persian: پادنا) may refer to:

- Padena District
- Padena-ye Olya Rural District
- Padena-ye Sofla Rural District
- Padena-ye Vosta Rural District
