= Bazargah, Isfahan =

Village in Isfahan province, Iran

Bazargah Persian: بازارگاه
- Village
- Location within Iran
- Coordinates: 30°53′35″N 51°42′40″E
- Country: Iran
- Province: Isfahan
- County: Semirom
- District: Padena-ye Olya
- Rural District: Baraftab

Population (2016)
  - Total: 365
- Time zone: UTC+3:30 (IRST)

Bazargah (Persian: بازارگاه) (Note: Also romanized as Bāzārgāh; also known as Bāzārgeh) is a village in Baraftab Rural District of Padena-ye Olya District (Note: Formerly Danakuh Rural District) in Semirom County, Isfahan province, Iran.

== Demographics ==
=== Population ===
At the time of the 2006 National Census, the village's population was 286 in 58 households, when it was in Padena-ye Olya Rural District of Padena District. The following census in 2011 counted 220 people in 61 households. The 2016 census measured the population of the village as 365 people in 118 households, by which time the rural district had been separated from the district in the formation of Danakuh District. (Note: Renamed Padena-ye Olya District) Bazargah was transferred to Baraftab Rural District created in the new district.
