= Lor Kosh =

Village in Isfahan province, Iran

Lor Kosh Persian: لركش
- Village
- Location within Iran
- Coordinates: 30°55′38″N 51°41′12″E
- Country: Iran
- Province: Isfahan
- County: Semirom
- District: Padena-ye Olya
- Rural District: Baraftab

Population (2016)
  - Total: 146
- Time zone: UTC+3:30 (IRST)

Lor Kosh (Persian: لركش) (Note: Also known as Lūr Kosh) is a village in Baraftab Rural District of Padena-ye Olya District (Note: Formerly Danakuh Rural District) in Semirom County, Isfahan province, Iran.

== Demographics ==
=== Population ===
At the time of the 2006 National Census, the village's population was 155 in 36 households, when it was in Padena-ye Olya Rural District of Padena District. The following census in 2011 counted 144 people in 39 households. The 2016 census measured the population of the village as 146 people in 37 households, by which time the rural district had been separated from the district in the formation of Danakuh District. (Note: Renamed Padena-ye Olya District) Lor Kosh was transferred to Baraftab Rural District created in the new district.
