= Rahiz =

Village in Isfahan province, Iran

Rahiz Persian: رهیز
- Village
- Location within Iran
- Coordinates: 30°52′42″N 51°42′37″E
- Country: Iran
- Province: Isfahan
- County: Semirom
- District: Padena-ye Olya
- Rural District: Baraftab

Population (2016)
  - Total: 603
- Time zone: UTC+3:30 (IRST)

Rahiz (Persian: رهیز) (Note: Also romanized as Rahīz) is a village in Baraftab Rural District of Padena-ye Olya District (Note: Formerly Danakuh Rural District) in Semirom County, Isfahan province, Iran.

== Demographics ==
=== Population ===
At the time of the 2006 National Census, the village's population was 487 in 111 households, when it was in Padena-ye Olya Rural District of Padena District. The following census in 2011 counted 417 people in 124 households. The 2016 census measured the population of the village as 603 people in 191 households, by which time the rural district had been separated from the district in the formation of Danakuh District. (Note: Renamed Padena-ye Olya District) Rahiz was transferred to Baraftab Rural District created in the new district.
