= Kifteh =

Village in Isfahan province, Iran

Kifteh Persian: كيفته
- Village
- Location within Iran
- Coordinates: 30°55′56″N 51°40′37″E
- Country: Iran
- Province: Isfahan
- County: Semirom
- District: Padena-ye Olya
- Rural District: Baraftab

Population (2016)
  - Total: 929
- Time zone: UTC+3:30 (IRST)

Kifteh (Persian: كيفته) (Note: Also romanized as Kīfteh; also known as Kīfleh; also known as Hoseyni (حسيني)) is a village in Baraftab Rural District of Padena-ye Olya District (Note: Formerly Danakuh Rural District) in Semirom County, Isfahan province, Iran.

== Demographics ==
=== Population ===
At the time of the 2006 National Census, the village's population was 1,025 in 214 households, when it was in Padena-ye Olya Rural District of Padena District. The following census in 2011 counted 872 people in 241 households. The 2016 census measured the population of the village as 929 people in 261 households, by which time the rural district had been separated from the district in the formation of Danakuh District. (Note: Renamed Padena-ye Olya District) Kifteh was transferred to Baraftab Rural District created in the new district. It was the most populous village in its rural district.
