= Shahid, Isfahan =

Village in Isfahan province, Iran

Shahid Persian: شهيد
- Village
- Location within Iran
- Coordinates: 30°50′40″N 51°44′24″E
- Country: Iran
- Province: Isfahan
- County: Semirom
- District: Padena-ye Olya
- Rural District: Baraftab

Population (2016)
  - Total: 664
- Time zone: UTC+3:30 (IRST)

Shahid (Persian: شهيد) (Note: Also romanized as Shahīd) is a village in Baraftab Rural District of Padena-ye Olya District (Note: Formerly Danakuh Rural District) in Semirom County, Isfahan province, Iran.

== Demographics ==
=== Population ===
At the time of the 2006 National Census, the village's population was 489 in 112 households, when it was in Padena-ye Olya Rural District of Padena District. The following census in 2011 counted 425 people in 121 households. The 2016 census measured the population of the village as 664 people in 212 households, by which time the rural district had been separated from the district in the formation of Danakuh District. (Note: Renamed Padena-ye Olya District) Shahid was transferred to Baraftab Rural District created in the new district.
