= Kareh Dan =

Village in Isfahan province, Iran

Kareh Dan Persian: كره دان
- Village
- Location within Iran
- Coordinates: 30°52′03″N 51°43′49″E
- Country: Iran
- Province: Isfahan
- County: Semirom
- District: Padena-ye Olya
- Rural District: Baraftab

Population (2016)
  - Total: 481
- Time zone: UTC+3:30 (IRST)

Kareh Dan (Persian: كره دان) (Note: Also romanized as Kareh Dān; also known as Kahardān and Kahredān) is a village in, and the capital of, Baraftab Rural District in Padena-ye Olya District (Note: Formerly Danakuh Rural District) of Semirom County, Isfahan province, Iran.

== Demographics ==
=== Population ===
At the time of the 2006 National Census, the village's population was 384 in 90 households, when it was in Padena-ye Olya Rural District of Padena District. The following census in 2011 counted 299 people in 87 households. The 2016 census measured the population of the village as 481 people in 155 households, by which time the rural district had been separated from the district in the formation of Danakuh District. (Note: Renamed Padena-ye Olya District) Kareh Dan was transferred to Baraftab Rural District created in the new district.
