= Hasanabad-e Sofla, Semirom =

Village in Isfahan province, Iran

Hasanabad-e Sofla Persian: حسن ابادسفلي
- Village
- Location within Iran
- Coordinates: 30°52′06″N 51°46′31″E
- Country: Iran
- Province: Isfahan
- County: Semirom
- District: Padena-ye Olya
- Rural District: Baraftab

Population (2016)
  - Total: 451
- Time zone: UTC+3:30 (IRST)

Hasanabad-e Sofla (Persian: حسن ابادسفلي) (Note: Also romanized as Ḩasanābād-e Soflá; also known as Ḩasanābād-e Pā’īn) is a village in Baraftab Rural District of Padena-ye Olya District (Note: Formerly Danakuh Rural District) in Semirom County, Isfahan province, Iran.

== Demographics ==
=== Population ===
At the time of the 2006 National Census, the village's population was 341 in 78 households, when it was in Padena-ye Olya Rural District of Padena District. The following census in 2011 counted 258 people in 77 households. The 2016 census measured the population of the village as 451 people in 147 households, by which time the rural district had been separated from the district in the formation of Danakuh District. (Note: Renamed Padena-ye Olya District) Hasanabad-e Sofla was transferred to Baraftab Rural District created in the new district.
