= Valad Khani =

Village in Isfahan province, Iran

Valad Khani Persian: ولدخاني
- Village
- Location within Iran
- Coordinates: 30°52′35″N 51°43′16″E
- Country: Iran
- Province: Isfahan
- County: Semirom
- District: Padena-ye Olya
- Rural District: Baraftab

Population (2016)
  - Total: 244
- Time zone: UTC+3:30 (IRST)

Valad Khani (Persian: ولدخاني) (Note: Also romanized as Valad Khānī) is a village in Baraftab Rural District of Padena-ye Olya District (Note: Formerly Danakuh Rural District) in Semirom County, Isfahan province, Iran.

== Demographics ==
=== Population ===
At the time of the 2006 National Census, the village's population was 207 in 44 households, when it was in Padena-ye Olya Rural District of Padena District. The following census in 2011 counted 167 people in 47 households. The 2016 census measured the population of the village as 244 people in 74 households, by which time the rural district had been separated from the district in the formation of Danakuh District. (Note: Renamed Padena-ye Olya District) Valad Khani was transferred to Baraftab Rural District created in the new district.
