= Amirabad, Padena-ye Olya =

Village in Isfahan province, Iran

Amirabad Persian: اميراباد
- Village
- Location within Iran
- Coordinates: 30°51′53″N 51°43′20″E
- Country: Iran
- Province: Isfahan
- County: Semirom
- District: Padena-ye Olya
- Rural District: Baraftab

Population (2016)
  - Total: 378
- Time zone: UTC+3:30 (IRST)

Amirabad (Persian: اميراباد) (Note: Also romanized as Amīrābād) is a village in Baraftab Rural District of Padena-ye Olya District (Note: Formerly Danakuh Rural District) in Semirom County, Isfahan province, Iran.

== Demographics ==
=== Population ===
At the time of the 2006 National Census, the village's population was 258 in 59 households, when it was in Padena-ye Olya Rural District of Padena District. The following census in 2011 counted 227 people in 65 households. The 2016 census measured the population of the village as 378 people in 118 households, by which time the rural district had been separated from the district in the formation of Danakuh District. (Note: Renamed Padena-ye Olya District) Amirabad was transferred to Baraftab Rural District created in the new district.
