= Tang-e Khoshk =

Tang-e Khoshk (Persian: تنگ خشك) may refer to:

- Tang-e Khoshk, Isfahan
- Tang-e Khoshk, Khuzestan
- Tang-e Khoshk, Kohgiluyeh and Boyer-Ahmad
