= Pahlushekan =

Village in Isfahan province, Iran

Pahlushekan Persian: پهلوشكن
- Village
- Location within Iran
- Coordinates: 30°53′46″N 51°44′40″E
- Country: Iran
- Province: Isfahan
- County: Semirom
- District: Padena-ye Olya
- Rural District: Baraftab

Population (2016)
  - Total: 464
- Time zone: UTC+3:30 (IRST)

Pahlushekan (Persian: پهلوشكن) (Note: Also romanized as Pahlūshekan) is a village in Baraftab Rural District of Padena-ye Olya District (Note: Formerly Danakuh Rural District) in Semirom County, Isfahan province, Iran.

== Demographics ==
=== Population ===
At the time of the 2006 National Census, the village's population was 287 in 64 households, when it was in Padena-ye Olya Rural District of Padena District. The following census in 2011 counted 274 people in 73 households. The 2016 census measured the population of the village as 464 people in 124 households, by which time the rural district had been separated from the district in the formation of Danakuh District. (Note: Renamed Padena-ye Olya District) Pahlushekan was transferred to Baraftab Rural District created in the new district.
