= Qasemlu, Isfahan =

Qasemlu قاسملو
- Village
- Location within Iran
- Coordinates: 30°52′48″N 51°37′40″E
- Country: Iran
- Province: Isfahan
- County: Semirom
- Bakhsh: Padena-ye Olya
- Rural District: Padena-ye Olya

Population (2016)
  - Total: 297
- Time zone: UTC+3:30 (IRST)
  - Summer (DST): UTC+4:30 (IRDT)

Qasemlu (Persian: قاسملو, also Romanized as Qasemlu and Qāsemlu) is a village in Iran. The 2016 census measured the population of the village as 297 people in 82 households
