= Ganjegan, Isfahan =

Village in Isfahan province, Iran

Ganjegan Persian: گنجگان
- Village
- Location within Iran
- Coordinates: 30°55′08″N 51°42′28″E
- Country: Iran
- Province: Isfahan
- County: Semirom
- District: Padena-ye Olya
- Rural District: Baraftab

Population (2016)
  - Total: 379
- Time zone: UTC+3:30 (IRST)

Ganjegan (Persian: گنجگان) (Note: Also romanized as Ganjegān; also known as Ganjegāh and Ganjekān) is a village in Baraftab Rural District of Padena-ye Olya District (Note: Formerly Danakuh Rural District) in Semirom County, Isfahan province, Iran.

== Demographics ==
=== Population ===
At the time of the 2006 National Census, the village's population was 358 in 76 households, when it was in Padena-ye Olya Rural District of Padena District. The following census in 2011 counted 352 people in 89 households. The 2016 census measured the population of the village as 379 people in 110 households, by which time the rural district had been separated from the district in the formation of Danakuh District. (Note: Renamed Padena-ye Olya District) Ganjegan was transferred to Baraftab Rural District created in the new district.
