= Dengezlu =

Village in Isfahan province, Iran

Dengezlu Persian: دنگزلو
- Village
- Location within Iran
- Coordinates: 30°52′07″N 51°38′54″E
- Country: Iran
- Province: Isfahan
- County: Semirom
- District: Padena-ye Olya
- Rural District: Padena-ye Olya

Population (2016)
  - Total: 697
- Time zone: UTC+3:30 (IRST)

Dengezlu (Persian: دنگزلو) (Note: Also romanized as Dangazlū and Dengezlū; also known as Dahgezlī, Dangazlū-ye ‘Olyā, Deng-e Zolī, and Dengezī) is a village in Padena-ye Olya Rural District of Padena-ye Olya District (Note: Formerly Danakuh Rural District) in Semirom County, Isfahan province, Iran.

== Demographics ==
=== Population ===
At the time of the 2006 National Census, the village's population was 347 in 79 households, when it was in Padena District. The following census in 2011 counted 265 people in 86 households. The 2016 census measured the population of the village as 697 people in 165 households, by which time the rural district had been separated from the district in the formation of Danakuh District. (Note: Renamed Padena-ye Olya District)
