= Sarbaz, Isfahan =

Village in Isfahan province, Iran

Sarbaz Persian: سرباز
- Village
- Location within Iran
- Coordinates: 30°57′11″N 51°36′00″E
- Country: Iran
- Province: Isfahan
- County: Semirom
- District: Padena-ye Olya
- Rural District: Padena-ye Olya

Population (2016)
  - Total: 664
- Time zone: UTC+3:30 (IRST)

Sarbaz (Persian: سرباز) (Note: Also romanized as Sarbāz) is a village in Padena-ye Olya Rural District of Padena-ye Olya District (Note: Formerly Danakuh Rural District) in Semirom County, Isfahan province, Iran.

== Demographics ==
=== Population ===
At the time of the 2006 National Census, the village's population was 310 in 66 households, when it was in Padena District. The following census in 2011 counted 394 people in 98 households. The 2016 census measured the population of the village as 664 people in 186 households, by which time the rural district had been separated from the district in the formation of Danakuh District. (Note: Renamed Padena-ye Olya District)
