= Zaman Kahriz =

Village in Isfahan province, Iran

Zaman Kahriz Persian: زمان كهريز
- Village
- Location within Iran
- Country: Iran
- Province: Isfahan
- County: Semirom
- District: Padena-ye Olya
- Rural District: Padena-ye Olya

Population (2016)
  - Total: 0
- Time zone: UTC+3:30 (IRST)

Zaman Kahriz (Persian: زمان كهريز) (Note: Also romanized as Zamān Kahrīz; also known as Zabān Kahrīz) is a village in Padena-ye Olya Rural District of Padena-ye Olya District (Note: Formerly Danakuh Rural District) in Semirom County, Isfahan province, Iran.

== Demographics ==
=== Population ===
At the time of the 2006 National Census, the village's population was 60 in 16 households, when it was in Padena District. The village did not appear in the following census of 2011. The 2016 census measured the population of the village as zero, by which time the rural district had been separated from the district in the formation of Danakuh District. (Note: Renamed Padena-ye Olya District)
