= Deh-e Bozorg, Isfahan =

Village in Isfahan province, Iran

Deh-e Bozorg Persian: ده برزگ
- Village
- Location within Iran
- Coordinates: 33°00′34″N 49°40′05″E
- Country: Iran
- Province: Isfahan
- County: Semirom
- District: Padena-ye Olya
- Rural District: Padena-ye Olya

Population (2016)
  - Total: 239
- Time zone: UTC+3:30 (IRST)

Deh-e Bozorg (Persian: ده برزگ) (Note: Also romanized as Deh Bozorg) is a village in Padena-ye Olya Rural District of Padena-ye Olya District (Note: Formerly Danakuh Rural District) in Semirom County, Isfahan province, Iran.

== Demographics ==
=== Population ===
At the time of the 2006 National Census, the village's population was 219 in 44 households, when it was in Padena District. The following census in 2011 counted 209 people in 57 households. The 2016 census measured the population of the village as 239 people in 71 households, by which time the rural district had been separated from the district in the formation of Danakuh District. (Note: Renamed Padena-ye Olya District)
