= Kahangan =

Village in Isfahan province, Iran

Kahangan Persian: كهنگان
- Village
- Location within Iran
- Coordinates: 30°53′43″N 51°39′03″E
- Country: Iran
- Province: Isfahan
- County: Semirom
- District: Padena-ye Olya
- Rural District: Padena-ye Olya

Population (2016)
  - Total: 979
- Time zone: UTC+3:30 (IRST)

Kahangan (Persian: كهنگان) (Note: Also romanized as Kahangān and Kohangān) is a village in Padena-ye Olya Rural District of Padena-ye Olya District (Note: Formerly Danakuh Rural District) in Semirom County, Isfahan province, Iran.

== Demographics ==
=== Population ===
At the time of the 2006 National Census, the village's population was 882 in 195 households, when it was in Padena District. The following census in 2011 counted 768 people in 220 households. The 2016 census measured the population of the village as 979 people in 300 households, by which time the rural district had been separated from the district in the formation of Danakuh District. (Note: Renamed Padena-ye Olya District)
