= Devergan =

Devergan (Persian: دورگان), also rendered as Daverjan, may refer to:

- Devergan-e Olya
- Devergan-e Sofla
