= Baraftab Rural District =

Rural district in Isfahan province, Iran

Baraftab Rural District Persian: دهستان برآفتاب
- Rural District
- Location within Iran
- Coordinates: 30°51′N 51°47′E
- Country: Iran
- Province: Isfahan
- County: Semirom
- District: Padena-ye Olya
- Established: 2012
- Capital: Kareh Dan

Population (2016)
  - Total: 5,104
- Time zone: UTC+3:30 (IRST)

Baraftab Rural District (Persian: دهستان برآفتاب) is in Padena-ye Olya District (Note: Formerly Danakuh District) of Semirom County, Isfahan province, Iran. Its capital is the village of Kareh Dan.

== History ==
In 2012, Padena-ye Olya Rural District was separated from Padena District in the formation of Danakuh District, (Note: Renamed Padena-ye Olya District) and Baraftab Rural District was created in the new district.

== Demographics ==
=== Population ===
At the time of the 2016 National Census, the rural district's population was 5,104 in 1,547 households. The most populous of its 26 villages was Kifteh, with 929 people.

=== Other villages in the rural district ===
- Amirabad
- Bazargah
- Ganjegan
- Hasanabad-e Sofla
- Lor Kosh
- Pahlushekan
- Rahiz
- Shahid
- Valad Khani
