= Barand =

Barand (Persian: بارند) may refer to:

- Barand-e Olya
- Barand-e Sofla

== See also ==
- Báránd, Hungary
