= Do Rahan, Isfahan =

Village in Isfahan province, Iran

Do Rahan Persian: دوراهان
- Village
- Location within Iran
- Coordinates: 30°55′21″N 51°38′45″E
- Country: Iran
- Province: Isfahan
- County: Semirom
- District: Padena-ye Olya
- Rural District: Padena-ye Olya

Population (2016)
  - Total: 340
- Time zone: UTC+3:30 (IRST)

Do Rahan (Persian: دوراهان) (Note: Also romanized as Do Rāhān and Dowrāhān) is a village in Padena-ye Olya Rural District of Padena-ye Olya District (Note: Formerly Danakuh Rural District) in Semirom County, Isfahan province, Iran.

== Demographics ==
=== Population ===
At the time of the 2006 National Census, the village's population was 245 in 62 households, when it was in Padena District. The following census in 2011 counted 242 people in 66 households. The 2016 census measured the population of the village as 340 people in 97 households, by which time the rural district had been separated from the district in the formation of Danakuh District. (Note: Renamed Padena-ye Olya District)
