= Noqol =

Village in Isfahan province, Iran

Noqol Persian: نقل
- Village
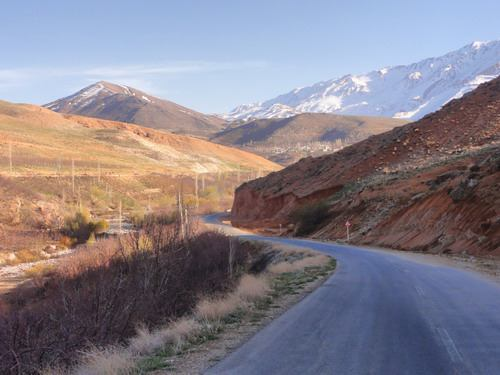
- The white snowy mount is Mount Dena (Pazan Pir Peak); the black pyramidal shape mount is Kuh-e Noqol; and the small mount lying in front of them is Takht. The khaki hills on the left are Mowrderaz, and the river is Rudkhaneh-ye Sard (Cold River). This photo shows Noqol's landscape in December 2013.

- Location within Iran
- Coordinates: 30°52′04″N 51°39′12″E
- Country: Iran
- Province: Isfahan
- County: Semirom
- District: Padena-ye Olya
- Rural District: Padena-ye Olya
- Elevation: 2,276 m (7,467 ft)

Population (2016)
  - Total: 346
- Time zone: UTC+3:30 (IRST)

Noqol (Persian: نقل) is a village in Padena-ye Olya Rural District of Padena-ye Olya District (Note: Formerly Danakuh Rural District) in Semirom County, Isfahan province, Iran.

== Etymology ==
The name "Noqol" is derived from the Persian name "Now Qaleh", which means "new castle ". So "Noqol" is a combination of shorted variant of two words "Now" "نو" and "Qaleh" "قلعه "."Now" in Persian means "new" and "Qaleh" means "castle".

== History ==
Noqol is a village in the collection of villages called Padena. Padena is located less than 150 km north-west of Persepolis, the glorious capital of Achaemenian Empire. Although there is not a credible resource on the history of this village, mostly because of lack of scientific study, but, since this mountain region has been one of the main sources of water for the nearby capital of Achaemenian Empire, it was probably inhabited and had a significant strategic importance for the world's most powerful empire in fifth century B.C. There are some ruined grave nearby the village shows an unknown history. There are also, many customs, believes, traditions and words in the culture of this village trace back to the Ancient Persia.

After invasion of Turks and Mongols to Persia, this village as same as the other Iranian farmers who was living in the rural areas has engaged in a conflict with the nomadic Turkic tribes looking for pasture for their flock of sheep. This conflict in the past millennium has been the destiny of the people of this village and the other villages in Padena. In the nineteenth century, although they were working and living in the village, all the lands of village possessed to Qashqai Khans. Some modern historical events such as; Iranian Constitutional Revolution in 1906, Oppression of Nomads (Feudalists) and Land Reform in 1960s made them the owners of lands of the village.

== Demographics ==
=== Ethnicity ===
Historically they have called themselves Tajik to distinguish themselves, first, from the Qashqai a nomadic Turkic tribe that have been their neighbors for at least two centuries, and secondly from the Lurs, who lives in the west range of the Dena mountains. so they are ethnically Tajik. Tajik is a subdivision of Fars (Persian).

=== Religion ===
Noqol's people belong to Jafari shia faith. There is no holy shrine and clergyman in the village but they historically respect two holy shrines outside the village; Pir davood in Kohangan and Seyed Mohammad in Khafr.

=== Population ===
At the time of the 2006 National Census, the village's population was 315 in 73 households, when it was in Padena District. The following census in 2011 counted 270 people in 80 households. The 2016 census measured the population of the village as 346 people in 108 households, by which time the rural district had been separated from the district in the formation of Danakuh District. (Note: Renamed Padena-ye Olya District)

== Geography ==
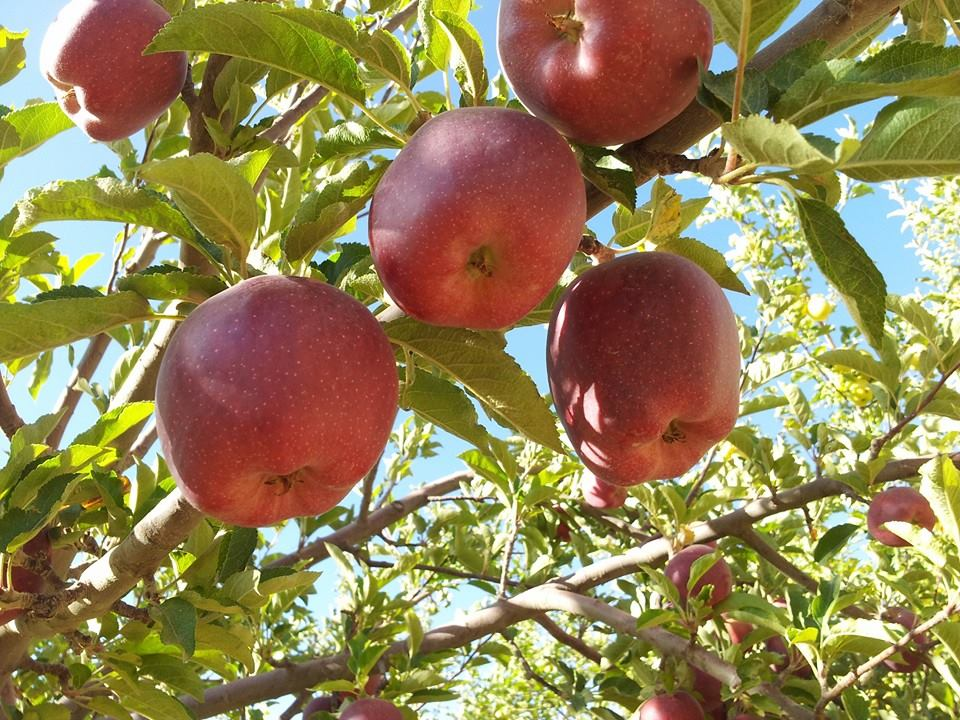
Red apple

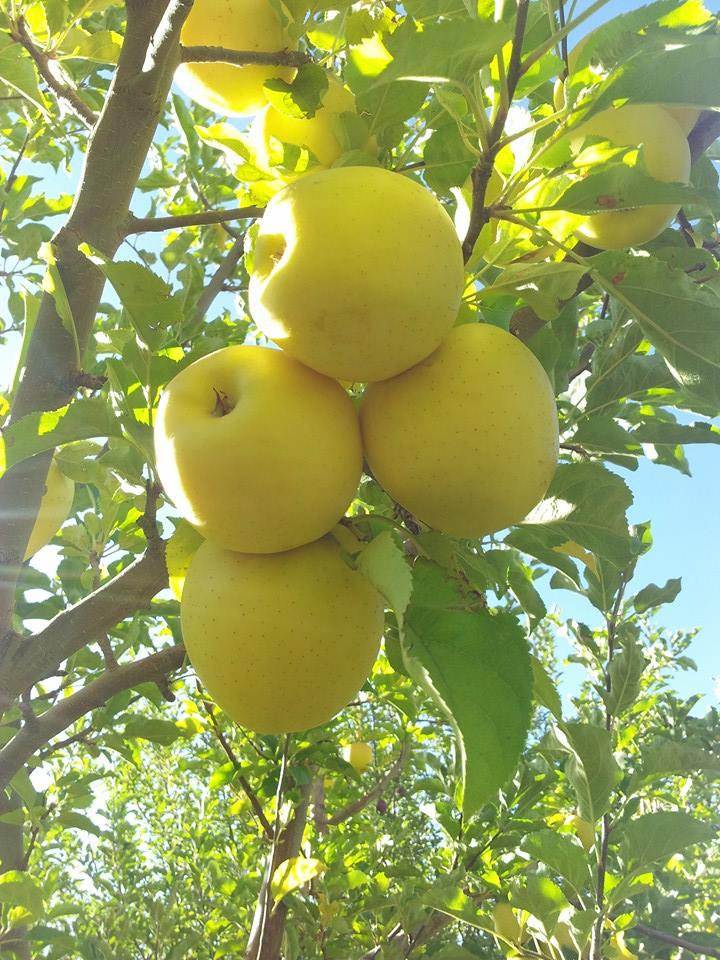
Golden apple

Noqol lies at 2,276 metres (7,467 ft) above sea level.

=== Kuh-e Noqol ===
Kuh-e Noqol is a 2,956 metres (9,698 ft) mountain peak located south of the village of Noqol. According to Peakery.com, "it ranks as the 172nd highest mountain in Işfahān and the 1535th highest mountain in Iran. The nearest peaks are, Kuh-e Cheshmeh Nul, Kuh-e Dena, Kuh-e Chalchavili, Kuh-e Almalu, and Kuh-e Dama". Although the mountain receives a lot of precipitation in winter, there is little water resource in the summer, which distinguishes it from the mountain of Dena (Dinar). Kuh-e Noqol consists of dark black rocks, that's why it is named 'Kuhe e Siyah' (Persian کوه سیاه ), meaning Black Mountain.

=== Climate ===
Noqol has a four seasons climate. Spring is characterized by blooming apple blossoms, summer by the smell of reached apples. During autumn these trees turn various colors, including red, orange and yellow, and winter is typically characterized by snow, as well as temperatures that can drop to below freezing point.

=== Natural resources ===
Water is the most important natural resource in this village. The main stream, recently canalized, used for irrigation of apple gardens, originates from the Pazanpir Peak.
