= Nurabad, Padena-ye Olya =

Village in Isfahan province, Iran

Nurabad Persian: نوراباد
- Village
- Location within Iran
- Coordinates: 30°56′09″N 51°36′41″E
- Country: Iran
- Province: Isfahan
- County: Semirom
- District: Padena-ye Olya
- Rural District: Padena-ye Olya

Population (2016)
  - Total: 532
- Time zone: UTC+3:30 (IRST)

Nurabad (Persian: نوراباد) (Note: Also romanized as Nūrābād) is a village in Padena-ye Olya Rural District of Padena-ye Olya District (Note: Formerly Danakuh Rural District) in Semirom County, Isfahan province, Iran.

== Demographics ==
=== Population ===
At the time of the 2006 National Census, the village's population was 330 in 69 households, when it was in Padena District. The following census in 2011 counted 434 people in 101 households. The 2016 census measured the population of the village as 532 people in 148 households, by which time the rural district had been separated from the district in the formation of Danakuh District. (Note: Renamed Padena-ye Olya District)
