= Tall Mohammad =

Village in Isfahan province, Iran

Tall Mohammad Persian: تل محمد
- Village
- Location within Iran
- Coordinates: 30°53′44″N 51°37′52″E
- Country: Iran
- Province: Isfahan
- County: Semirom
- District: Padena-ye Olya
- Rural District: Padena-ye Olya

Population (2016)
  - Total: 334
- Time zone: UTC+3:30 (IRST)

Tall Mohammad (Persian: تل محمد) (Note: Also romanized as Tal Moḩammad, Tal-e Moḩammad, Tall Moḩammad, and Tall-e Moḩammad) is a village in Padena-ye Olya Rural District of Padena-ye Olya District (Note: Formerly Danakuh Rural District) in Semirom County, Isfahan province, Iran.

== Demographics ==
=== Population ===
At the time of the 2006 National Census, the village's population was 374 in 81 households, when it was in Padena District. The following census in 2011 counted 395 people in 115 households. The 2016 census measured the population of the village as 334 people in 103 households, by which time the rural district had been separated from the district in the formation of Danakuh District. (Note: Renamed Padena-ye Olya District)
