= Sheybani, Isfahan =

Village in Isfahan province, Iran

Sheybani Persian: شیبانی
- Village
- Location within Iran
- Coordinates: 30°57′03″N 51°37′17″E
- Country: Iran
- Province: Isfahan
- County: Semirom
- District: Padena-ye Olya
- Rural District: Padena-ye Olya

Population (2016)
  - Total: 256
- Time zone: UTC+3:30 (IRST)

Sheybani (Persian: شیبانی) (Note: Also romanized as Sheybānī) is a village in Padena-ye Olya Rural District of Padena-ye Olya District (Note: Formerly Danakuh Rural District) in Semirom County, Isfahan province, Iran.

== Demographics ==
=== Population ===
At the time of the 2006 National Census, the village's population was 169 in 40 households, when it was in Padena District. The following census in 2011 counted 200 people in 62 households. The 2016 census measured the population of the village as 256 people in 72 households, by which time the rural district had been separated from the district in the formation of Danakuh District. (Note: Renamed Padena-ye Olya District)
