= Dasht-e Bal, Isfahan =

Village in Isfahan province, Iran

Dasht-e Bal Persian: دشتبال
- Village
- Location within Iran
- Coordinates: 30°59′11″N 51°33′50″E
- Country: Iran
- Province: Isfahan
- County: Semirom
- District: Padena-ye Olya
- Rural District: Padena-ye Olya

Population (2016)
  - Total: 229
- Time zone: UTC+3:30 (IRST)

Dasht-e Bal (Persian: دشتبال) (Note: Also romanized as Dasht-e Bāl) is a village in Padena-ye Olya Rural District of Padena-ye Olya District (Note: Formerly Danakuh Rural District) in Semirom County, Isfahan province, Iran.

== Demographics ==
=== Population ===
At the time of the 2006 National Census, the village's population was 106 in 25 households, when it was in Padena District. The following census in 2011 counted 153 people in 38 households. The 2016 census measured the population of the village as 229 people in 66 households, by which time the rural district had been separated from the district in the formation of Danakuh District. (Note: Renamed Padena-ye Olya District)
