= Iran Aseman Airlines =

Iranian airline

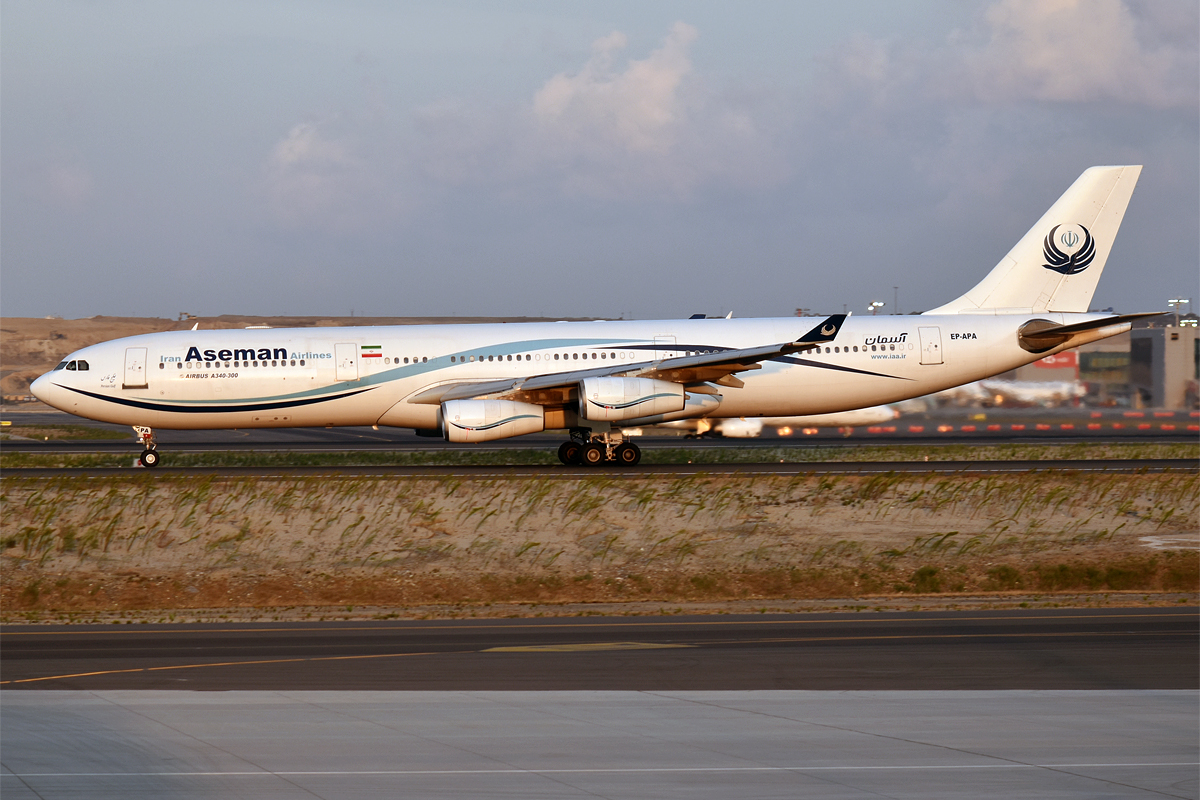
- Iran Aseman Airlines Airbus A340, this is the only Aseman A340 as of 2026
IATA	ICAO	Call sign
EP	IRC	ASEMAN
- Founded: 1970; 56 years ago as Air Taxi
- Commenced operations: 1980; 46 years ago as Iran Aseman Airlines
- Hubs: Isfahan Shahid Beheshti International Airport; Mashhad Shahid Hasheminejad International Airport; Shiraz Shahid Dastgheib International Airport; Tehran Imam Khomeini International Airport; Tehran Mehrabad Airport
- Fleet size: 3
- Destinations: 35
- Parent company: Iranian Civil Pension Fund Investment Company
- Headquarters: Mehrabad International Airport, Tehran, Iran
- Key people: Capt Hassan Ghasemi (CEO)
- Employees: About 4000
- Website: www.iaa.ir

Iran Aseman Airlines (Persian: هواپیمایی آسمان, romanized: Havâpeymâyi-ye Âsemân) is an Iranian airline, the third-largest in the country, headquartered in Tehran. It operates scheduled domestic passenger services and regional international services. The logo of Aseman Airlines is navy blue and is inspired by a flying Crane (Dorna).

The airline is currently banned from operating in the airspace of the European Union for "failing to meet [safety-related] regulatory oversight standards of the EU".

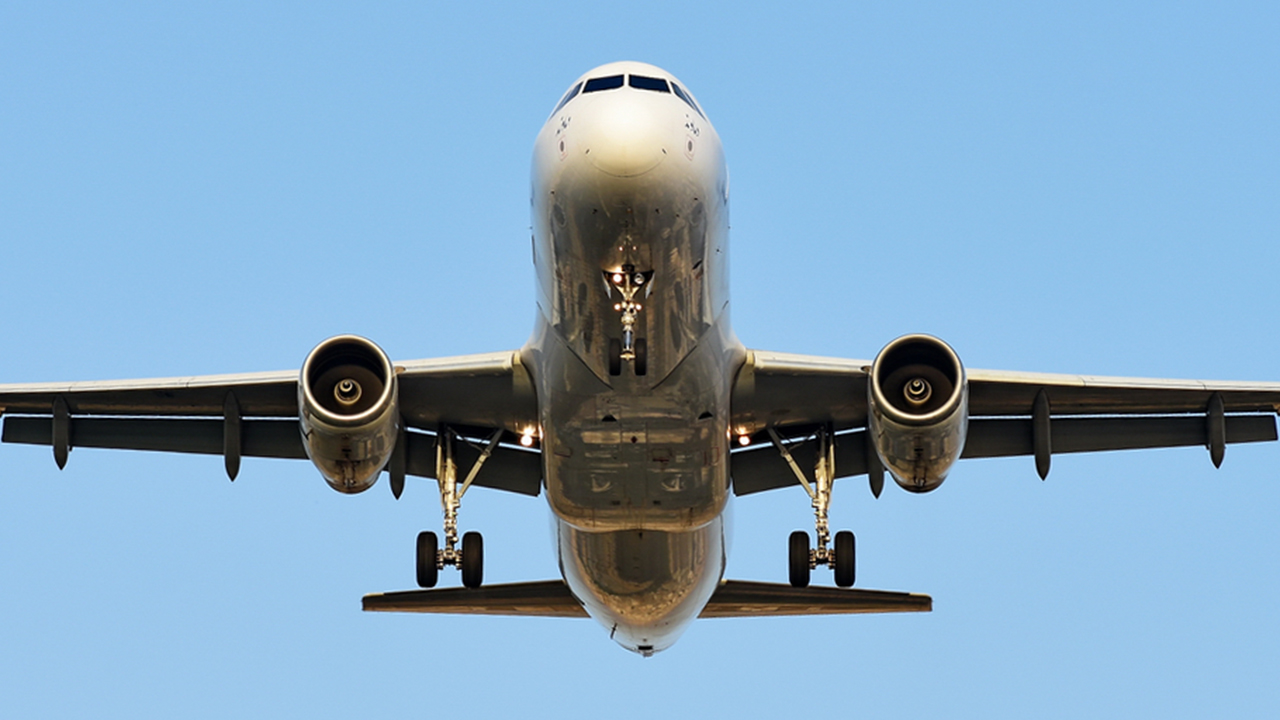
An Iran Aseman Airlines Airbus A320-231

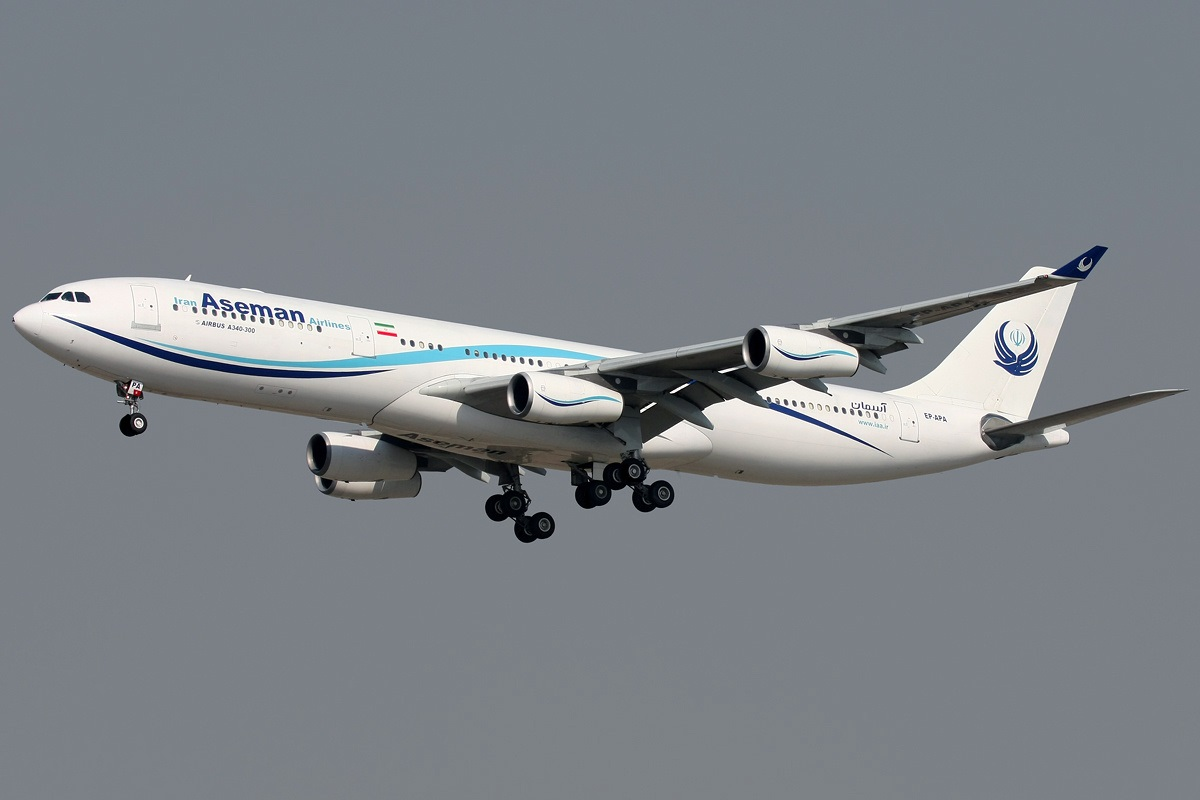
An Iran Aseman Airlines A340-311 landing in Tehran.

== History ==
=== Merger and early Days ===
The airline was established and started operating in 1980 following the merger of several airlines, Air Taxi Company, Pars Air Services Company, Hoor Asseman Airlines, Helicopter Company of Iran and Helicopter Service Company of Iran, on June 30th 1980 the airline commenced operations.

The airline in the 1990's operated aircraft like the Fokker F 28 for jet services and the Fokker F 27 for regional services, one Fokker F 27 was written off in 1990.

The airline in 1994 had a fleet consisting of 36 aircraft, while most of these were light aircraft the Boeing 727 was in the fleet making it the first large jet aircraft in the Iran Aseman Airlines fleet.

The airline's first major accident happened when a Fokker F 28 crashed in 1994 when both its engines were contaminated with fuel. At the time the airline was known as Iran Asseman Airlines which later dropped one of the Ss in its name.

=== The 2000s ===
In January 2001 the airline changed its name from Iran Asseman Airlines to Iran Aseman Airlines. In the 2000s the airline retired its Fokker F 28 fleet. March 2007, it was owned by Iranian Civil Pension Fund Investment Company and had 298 employees. It has since been privatized.

=== 2010s ===
In August 2014, Iran Aseman Airlines made changed the combination of its logo and livery to the current version. The design was prepared by a designer from Mashhad named Saeed Khosrovan, and was soon implemented on all aircraft operated by the airline. In the same year the Dassault Falcon 20E was lost in an accident.

In July 2016, the CEO of the airline was issued an arrest warrant because of an alleged sum of approximately $37 million in public debts to Iran Airports & Air Navigation Company. In 2016 the airline was the second largest in Iran by fleet size with 35 aircraft, only behind Mahan with 51.

In February 2017, it emerged that Aseman Airlines was in talks with an Irish firm to lease seven Airbus A320neos. In April 2017, the airline signed a Memorandum of Agreement with Boeing for the purchase of 30 Boeing 737 MAX aircraft with options for another 30 aircraft. In June 2017, Iran Aseman Airlines signed a final deal to buy 30 Boeing 737 MAX jets. In June 2018, Boeing announced it would not be able to deliver any aircraft to Iranian airlines due to the US's sanctions against Iran.

On 13 January 2019, the airline operated the last Boeing 727 commercial passenger flight worldwide.

=== 2020s ===
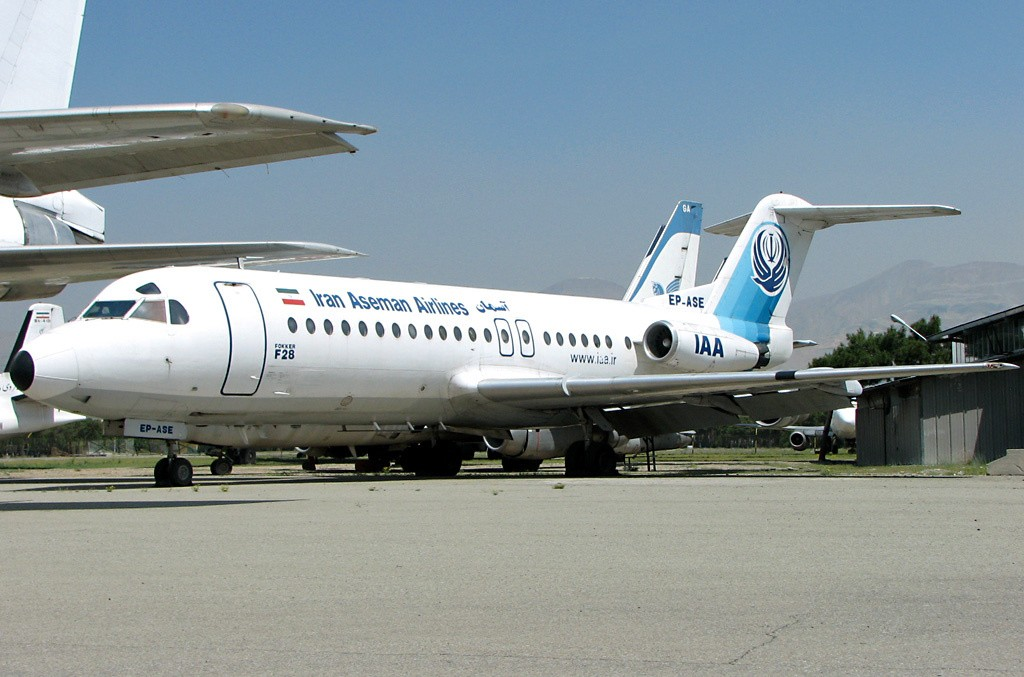
Former Fokker F 28 of Iran Aseman Airlines

In 2023 the airline partnered with Chabahar Airlines for an MRO deal. The airline in May of 2025 was set to restructure, and add aircraft. In 2025 the airline won three court cases for three Fokker 100 engines. The same year the troubled Aseman would attempt to gain investors to help grow the fleet of the airline.

A scandal emerged at the airline after the airline's debt. On December 3 2025 the airline reduced its active Fokker 100 fleet down to two aircraft. In 2026 the airline reduced its fleet to three aircraft, the airline's staff have also not been paid for months. After 120 days Aseman resumed operations with three aircraft on May 12, 2026 using a Fokker 100 as flight 3790. On July 8 2026 MPs would demand that Iran Aseman Airlines would pay it's staff that have not been paid for months. Aseman has not fully paid the staff yet.

== Fleet ==
=== Current fleet ===
As of August 2025, Iran Aseman Airlines operates the following aircraft:

Aircraft	In service	Orders	Passengers	Notes
Airbus A320-200	0	—		
Airbus A340-300	0	—	257	
Boeing 737-400	3	—	144	To be retired once A320-200s return to service
Fokker 100	2	—	100	
Total	7	0		

=== Former fleet ===
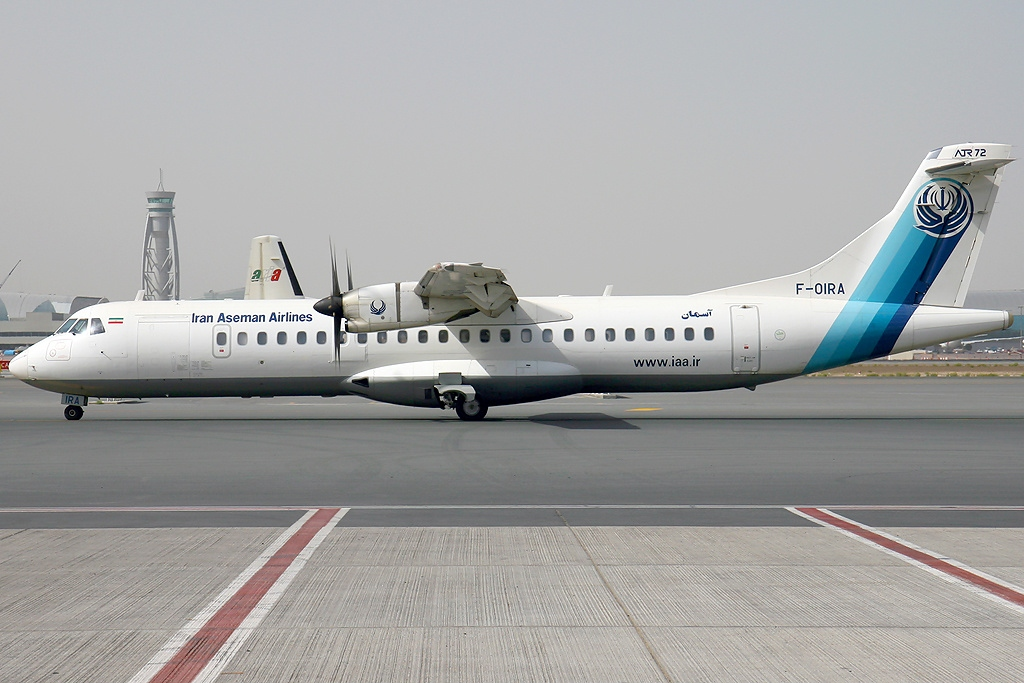
An Iran Aseman Airlines ATR 72-500

Aircraft	Total	Introduced	Retired	Notes
Airbus A320-200	5	2014	2021	All planes grounded due to sanctions.
ATR 72	5	1993	2019	1 crashed as Flight 3704
Boeing 727-200	4	1998	2019	Last commercial passenger operator of the Boeing 727
Dassault Falcon 20E	6	unknown	2014	EP-FIC destroyed in crash
Fokker F27 Friendship	2?	?	?	EP-ANA written off
Fokker F28 Fellowship	?	1980s-1990s	2004	One Crashed as flight 746, EP-PAU involved in incident
Fokker 100	16			
Dornier DO 228	5			

== Destinations ==
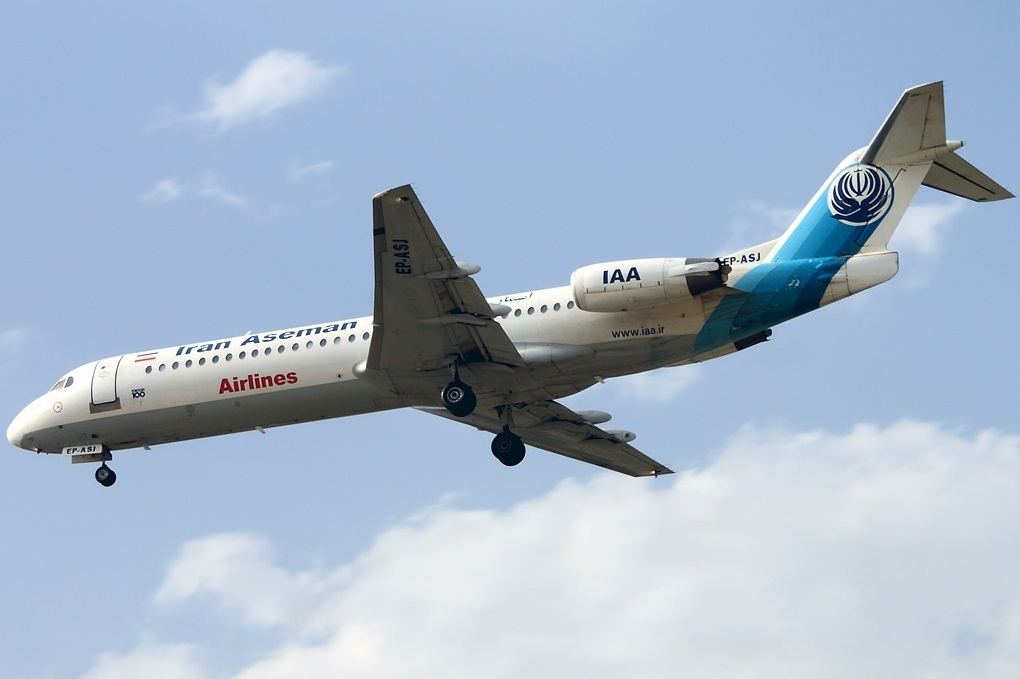
Fokker 100 Iran Aseman at Mehrabad International Airport, Tehran

=== Central Asia ===
- Kyrgyzstan
  - Bishkek
- Tajikistan
  - Dushanbe

=== Caucasia ===
- Armenia
  - Yerevan

=== South Asia ===
- Afghanistan
  - Kabul

=== Southwest Asia ===
- Bahrain
  - Bahrain International Airport
- Iran
  - Abadan
  - Ahwaz
  - Ardabil
  - Asalouyeh
  - Bam
  - Birjand
  - Bojnord
  - Bushehr
  - Ilam
  - Kermanshah
  - Khoy
  - Lamerd
  - Lar
  - Mashhad
  - Qeshm Island
  - Rafsanjan
  - Ramsar
  - Rasht
  - Sabzevar
  - Sahand
  - Sanandaj
  - Shiraz
  - Tabas
  - Tabriz
  - Tehran
  - Yasouj
  - Yazd
- Kuwait
  - Kuwait City
- Qatar
  - Doha
- United Arab Emirates
  - Dubai

== Accidents and incidents ==
- On 4 October 1990, an Iran Aseman Fokker F27 Friendship (registration EP-ANA) overran the runway upon landing at Ramsar Airport and came to rest at a concrete wall 100 metres behind the runway. There were no fatalities among the 46 passengers and four crew members on board, and the aircraft was fully repaired.
- On 12 October 1994, Iran Aseman Airlines Flight 746, a Fokker F28 Fellowship (registration EP-PAV) en route from Isfahan to Tehran suffered a sudden loss of power in both engines at 23:05 local time, 35 minutes after take-off from Isfahan International Airport. The aircraft spiraled into an uncontrolled descent and crashed near Natanz, killing all 59 passengers and seven crew members on board.
- On 18 July 2000, Iran Aseman Airlines Flight 775, a Fokker F28 Fellowship (registration EP-PAU) en route from Tehran to Ahvaz, was damaged beyond repair when the pilot missed the runway upon a low-visibility landing attempt at Ahvaz Airport and instead touched down next to it. A successful go-around was executed, and there were no injuries among the 84 passengers and four crew members on board.
- On 26 August 2010, a Fokker 100 (registration EP-ASL) operating Iran Aseman Airlines Flight 773 from Tehran to Tabriz overran the runway upon landing at Tabriz International Airport and was substantially damaged when it plunged into a canal. Two out of the 103 passengers on board were injured, while none of the seven crew members were hurt.
- On 10 May 2014, a Fokker 100 (registration EP-ASZ), was damaged in a landing accident at Zahedan Airport (ZAH), Iran. The airplane operated Flight 853 from Mashhad Airport (MHD). According to local media, the left-hand main undercarriage failed to extend or lock prior to landing. A forced landing was carried out on runway 35. The airplane swerved to the left and came to rest 1450 meters (4760 feet) past the runway 35 threshold and 23 meters (75 feet) to the left of the centreline.
- On 18 February 2018, Iran Aseman Airlines Flight 3704, an ATR 72-200 (registration EP-ATS) flying from Tehran to Yasuj, crashed into the Zagros Mountains, south of Isfahan after it disappeared from radar, 85 minutes after taking off from Mehrabad Airport. All 66 people (60 passengers and six crew) were killed.

== See also ==
- List of airlines of Iran
