= Saadatabad, Padena-ye Vosta =

Village in Isfahan province, Iran

Saadatabad Persian: سعادت اباد
- Village
- Location within Iran
- Coordinates: 31°03′01″N 51°37′19″E
- Country: Iran
- Province: Isfahan
- County: Semirom
- District: Padena
- Rural District: Padena-ye Vosta

Population (2016)
  - Total: 26
- Time zone: UTC+3:30 (IRST)

Saadatabad (Persian: سعادت اباد) (Note: Also romanized as Sa‘ādatābād) is a village in Padena-ye Vosta Rural District of Padena District in Semirom County, Isfahan province, Iran.

== Demographics ==
=== Population ===
At the time of the 2006 National Census, the village's population was 45 in 11 households. The following census in 2011 counted 59 people in 18 households. The 2016 census measured the population of the village as 26 people in 10 households.
