= Qayed Ali =

Village in Isfahan province, Iran

Qayed Ali Persian: قايدعلي
- Village
- Location within Iran
- Coordinates: 31°06′43″N 51°27′24″E
- Country: Iran
- Province: Isfahan
- County: Semirom
- District: Padena
- Rural District: Padena-ye Sofla

Population (2016)
  - Total: Below reporting threshold
- Time zone: UTC+3:30 (IRST)

Qayed Ali (Persian: قايدعلي) (Note: Also romanized as Qāyed ‘Alī; also known as Qā’ed ‘Alī) is a village in Padena-ye Sofla Rural District of Padena District in Semirom County, Isfahan province, Iran.

== Demographics ==
=== Population ===
At the time of the 2006 National Census, the village's population was 17 in four households. The following censuses in 2011 and 2016 counted a population below the reporting threshold.
