= Rudabad, Isfahan =

Village in Isfahan province, Iran

Rudabad Persian: روداباد
- Village
- Location within Iran
- Coordinates: 31°09′10″N 51°25′22″E
- Country: Iran
- Province: Isfahan
- County: Semirom
- District: Padena
- Rural District: Padena-ye Sofla

Population (2016)
  - Total: 499
- Time zone: UTC+3:30 (IRST)

Rudabad (Persian: روداباد) (Note: Also romanized as Rūdābād; also known as Rūdbār) is a village in Padena-ye Sofla Rural District of Padena District in Semirom County, Isfahan province, Iran.

== Demographics ==
=== Population ===
At the time of the 2006 National Census, the village's population was 433 in 99 households. The following census in 2011 counted 452 people in 136 households. The 2016 census measured the population of the village as 499 people in 161 households.
