= Khineh =

Village in Isfahan province, Iran

Khineh Persian: خينه
- Village
- Location within Iran
- Coordinates: 31°02′14″N 51°30′02″E
- Country: Iran
- Province: Isfahan
- County: Semirom
- District: Padena
- Rural District: Padena-ye Vosta

Population (2016)
  - Total: 396
- Time zone: UTC+3:30 (IRST)

Khineh (Persian: خينه) (Note: Also romanized as Khīneh) is a village in Padena-ye Vosta Rural District of Padena District in Semirom County, Isfahan province, Iran.

== Demographics ==
=== Population ===
At the time of the 2006 National Census, the village's population was 259 in 76 households. The following census in 2011 counted 209 people in 69 households. The 2016 census measured the population of the village as 396 people in 126 households.
