= Devergan-e Olya =

Village in Isfahan province, Iran

Devergan-e Olya Persian: دورگان عليا
- Village
- Location within Iran
- Coordinates: 30°54′44″N 51°38′01″E
- Country: Iran
- Province: Isfahan
- County: Semirom
- District: Padena-ye Olya
- Rural District: Padena-ye Olya

Population (2016)
  - Total: 154
- Time zone: UTC+3:30 (IRST)

Devergan-e Olya (Persian: دورگان عليا) (Note: Also romanized as Devergān-e ‘Olyā; also known as Daverjān-e Bālā, Devergān-e Bālā, and Devergān-e Pāīn) is a village in Padena-ye Olya Rural District of Padena-ye Olya District (Note: Formerly Danakuh Rural District) in Semirom County, Isfahan province, Iran.

== Demographics ==
=== Population ===
At the time of the 2006 National Census, the village's population was 54 in 14 households, when it was in Padena District. The following census in 2011 counted 127 people in 33 households. The 2016 census measured the population of the village as 154 people in 47 households, by which time the rural district had been separated from the district in the formation of Danakuh District. (Note: Renamed Padena-ye Olya District)
