= Galijeh, Isfahan =

Village in Isfahan province, Iran

Galijeh Persian: گليجه
- Village
- Location within Iran
- Country: Iran
- Province: Isfahan
- County: Semirom
- District: Padena
- Rural District: Padena-ye Sofla

Population (2016)
  - Total: Below reporting threshold
- Time zone: UTC+3:30 (IRST)

Galijeh (Persian: گليجه) (Note: Also romanized as Galījeh; also known as Kalījeh) is a village in Padena-ye Sofla Rural District of Padena District in Semirom County, Isfahan province, Iran.

== Demographics ==
=== Population ===
At the time of the 2006 National Census, the village's population was 17 in six households. The following censuses in 2011 and 2016 counted a population below the reporting threshold.
