= Gowd Tappeh =

Village in Isfahan province, Iran

Gowd Tappeh Persian: گودتپه
- Village
- Location within Iran
- Country: Iran
- Province: Isfahan
- County: Semirom
- District: Padena
- Rural District: Padena-ye Vosta

Population (2016)
  - Total: 0
- Time zone: UTC+3:30 (IRST)

Gowd Tappeh (Persian: گودتپه) (Note: Also known as Gāv Tappeh) is a village in Padena-ye Vosta Rural District of Padena District in Semirom County, Isfahan province, Iran.

== Demographics ==
=== Population ===
At the time of the 2006 National Census, the village's population was 72 in 19 households. The following census in 2011 counted 11 people in four households. The 2016 census measured the population of the village as zero.
