= Mandegan =

Village in Isfahan province, Iran

Mandegan Persian: ماندگان
- Village
- Location within Iran
- Coordinates: 31°05′45″N 51°26′23″E
- Country: Iran
- Province: Isfahan
- County: Semirom
- District: Padena
- Rural District: Padena-ye Sofla

Population (2016)
  - Total: 830
- Time zone: UTC+3:30 (IRST)

Mandegan (Persian: ماندگان) (Note: Also romanized as Māndegān; also known as Māndegān-e Soflá and Namdagūn) is a village in Padena-ye Sofla Rural District of Padena District in Semirom County, Isfahan province, Iran.

== Demographics ==
=== Population ===
At the time of the 2006 National Census, the village's population was 894 in 201 households. The following census in 2011 counted 667 people in 183 households. The 2016 census measured the population of the village as 830 people in 246 households.
