= Deyli =

Village in Isfahan province, Iran

Deyli Persian: ديلي
- Village
- Location within Iran
- Coordinates: 31°01′09″N 51°32′10″E
- Country: Iran
- Province: Isfahan
- County: Semirom
- District: Padena
- Rural District: Padena-ye Vosta

Population (2016)
  - Total: 344
- Time zone: UTC+3:30 (IRST)

Deyli (Persian: ديلي) (Note: Also romanized as Deylī; also known as Delī) is a village in Padena-ye Vosta Rural District of Padena District in Semirom County, Isfahan province, Iran.

== Demographics ==
=== Population ===
At the time of the 2006 National Census, the village's population was 329 in 79 households. The following census in 2011 counted 283 people in 84 households. The 2016 census measured the population of the village as 344 people in 103 households.
