= Devergan-e Sofla =

Village in Isfahan province, Iran

Devergan-e Sofla Persian: دورگان سفلي
- Village
- Location within Iran
- Coordinates: 30°55′02″N 51°38′17″E
- Country: Iran
- Province: Isfahan
- County: Semirom
- District: Padena-ye Olya
- Rural District: Padena-ye Olya

Population (2016)
  - Total: 71
- Time zone: UTC+3:30 (IRST)

Devergan-e Sofla (Persian: دورگان سفلي) (Note: Also romanized as Devergān-e Soflá; also known as Daverjān-e Pā’īn, Daverjān-e Soflá, Devergān, and Devergān-e Pā’īn) is a village in Padena-ye Olya Rural District of Padena-ye Olya District (Note: Formerly Danakuh Rural District) in Semirom County, Isfahan province, Iran.

== Demographics ==
=== Population ===
At the time of the 2006 National Census, the village's population was 125 in 26 households, when it was in Padena District. The following census in 2011 counted 28 people in 11 households. The 2016 census measured the population of the village as 71 people in 26 households, by which time the rural district had been separated from the district in the formation of Danakuh District. (Note: Renamed Padena-ye Olya District)
