= Saadatabad, Padena-ye Sofla =

Village in Isfahan province, Iran

Saadatabad Persian: سادات اباد
- Village
- Location within Iran
- Coordinates: 31°10′23″N 51°22′42″E
- Country: Iran
- Province: Isfahan
- County: Semirom
- District: Padena
- Rural District: Padena-ye Sofla

Population (2016)
  - Total: 1,645
- Time zone: UTC+3:30 (IRST)

Saadatabad (Persian: سادات اباد) (Note: Also romanized as Sa‘ādatābād) is a village in Padena-ye Sofla Rural District of Padena District in Semirom County, Isfahan province, Iran.

== Demographics ==
=== Population ===
At the time of the 2006 National Census, the village's population was 1,585 in 364 households. The following census in 2011 counted 1,610 people in 477 households. The 2016 census measured the population of the village as 1,645 people in 533 households, the most populous in its rural district.
