= Barand-e Olya =

Village in Isfahan province, Iran

Barand-e Olya Persian: بارندعليا
- Village
- Location within Iran
- Coordinates: 30°57′19″N 51°38′27″E
- Country: Iran
- Province: Isfahan
- County: Semirom
- District: Padena-ye Olya
- Rural District: Padena-ye Olya

Population (2016)
  - Total: 301
- Time zone: UTC+3:30 (IRST)

Barand-e Olya (Persian: بارندعليا) (Note: Also romanized as Bārand-e ‘Olyā; also known as Bārand-e Bālā) is a village in Padena-ye Olya Rural District of Padena-ye Olya District (Note: Formerly Danakuh Rural District) in Semirom County, Isfahan province, Iran.

== Demographics ==
=== Population ===
At the time of the 2006 National Census, the village's population was 302 in 70 households, when it was in Padena District. The following census in 2011 counted 303 people in 82 households. The 2016 census measured the population of the village as 301 people in 89 households, by which time the rural district had been separated from the district in the formation of Danakuh District. (Note: Renamed Padena-ye Olya District)
