= Bi Bi Seyyedan =

Village in Isfahan province, Iran

Bi Bi Seyyedan Persian: بي بي سيدان
- Village
- Location within Iran
- Coordinates: 31°10′54″N 51°26′52″E
- Country: Iran
- Province: Isfahan
- County: Semirom
- District: Padena
- Rural District: Padena-ye Sofla

Population (2016)
  - Total: 116
- Time zone: UTC+3:30 (IRST)

Bi Bi Seyyedan (Persian: بي بي سيدان) (Note: Also romanized as Bī Bī Seyyedān) is a village in Padena-ye Sofla Rural District of Padena District in Semirom County, Isfahan province, Iran.

== Demographics ==
=== Population ===
At the time of the 2006 National Census, the village's population was 111 in 27 households. The following census in 2011 counted 98 people in 31 households. The 2016 census measured the population of the village as 116 people in 40 households.
