= Murak, Isfahan =

Village in Isfahan province, Iran

Murak Persian: مورك
- Village
- Location within Iran
- Coordinates: 31°05′56″N 51°31′01″E
- Country: Iran
- Province: Isfahan
- County: Semirom
- District: Padena
- Rural District: Padena-ye Vosta

Population (2016)
  - Total: 1,187
- Time zone: UTC+3:30 (IRST)

Murak (Persian: مورك) (Note: Also romanized as Mūrak; also known as Mūrag) is a village in Padena-ye Vosta Rural District of Padena District in Semirom County, Isfahan province, Iran.

== Demographics ==
=== Population ===
At the time of the 2006 National Census, the village's population was 1,080 in 245 households. The following census in 2011 counted 1,046 people in 291 households. The 2016 census measured the population of the village as 1,187 people in 346 households.
