= Chahar Rah, Isfahan =

Village in Isfahan province, Iran

Chahar Rah Persian: چهارراه
- Village
- Location within Iran
- Coordinates: 31°10′25″N 51°23′00″E
- Country: Iran
- Province: Isfahan
- County: Semirom
- District: Padena
- Rural District: Padena-ye Sofla

Population (2016)
  - Total: 673
- Time zone: UTC+3:30 (IRST)

Chahar Rah (Persian: چهارراه) (Note: Also romanized as Chahār Rāh) is a village in, and the capital of, Padena-ye Sofla Rural District in Padena District of Semirom County, Isfahan province, Iran.

== Demographics ==
=== Population ===
At the time of the 2006 National Census, the village's population was 665 in 146 households. The following census in 2011 counted 562 people in 164 households. The 2016 census measured the population of the village as 673 people in 204 households.
