= Sivar, Isfahan =

Village in Isfahan province, Iran

Sivar Persian: سيور
- Village
- Location within Iran
- Coordinates: 31°06′07″N 51°25′11″E
- Country: Iran
- Province: Isfahan
- County: Semirom
- District: Padena
- Rural District: Padena-ye Sofla

Population (2016)
  - Total: 901
- Time zone: UTC+3:30 (IRST)

Sivar (Persian: سيور) (Note: Also romanized as Sīvar) is a village in Padena-ye Sofla Rural District of Padena District in Semirom County, Isfahan province, Iran.

== Demographics ==
=== Population ===
At the time of the 2006 National Census, the village's population was 932 in 233 households. The following census in 2011 counted 744 people in 242 households. The 2016 census measured the population of the village as 901 people in 298 households.
