= Gholam Hossein Sarmadnia =

Iranian researcher (1949–1994)

Gholam Hossein Sarmadnia (Persian: غلامحسین سرمدنیا; 1949 – 12 October 1994) was an Iranian researcher who served as assistant professor in the Department of Agriculture at the Isfahan University of Technology. He was awarded for his translation of the book Physiological Aspects of Dryland Farming at Iran's Book of the Year Awards in 1987.

== Death ==
Sarmadnia was killed in the crash of Iran Aseman Airlines Flight 746.
