= Iran Aseman Airlines Flight 3704 =

2018 aviation accident in Iran

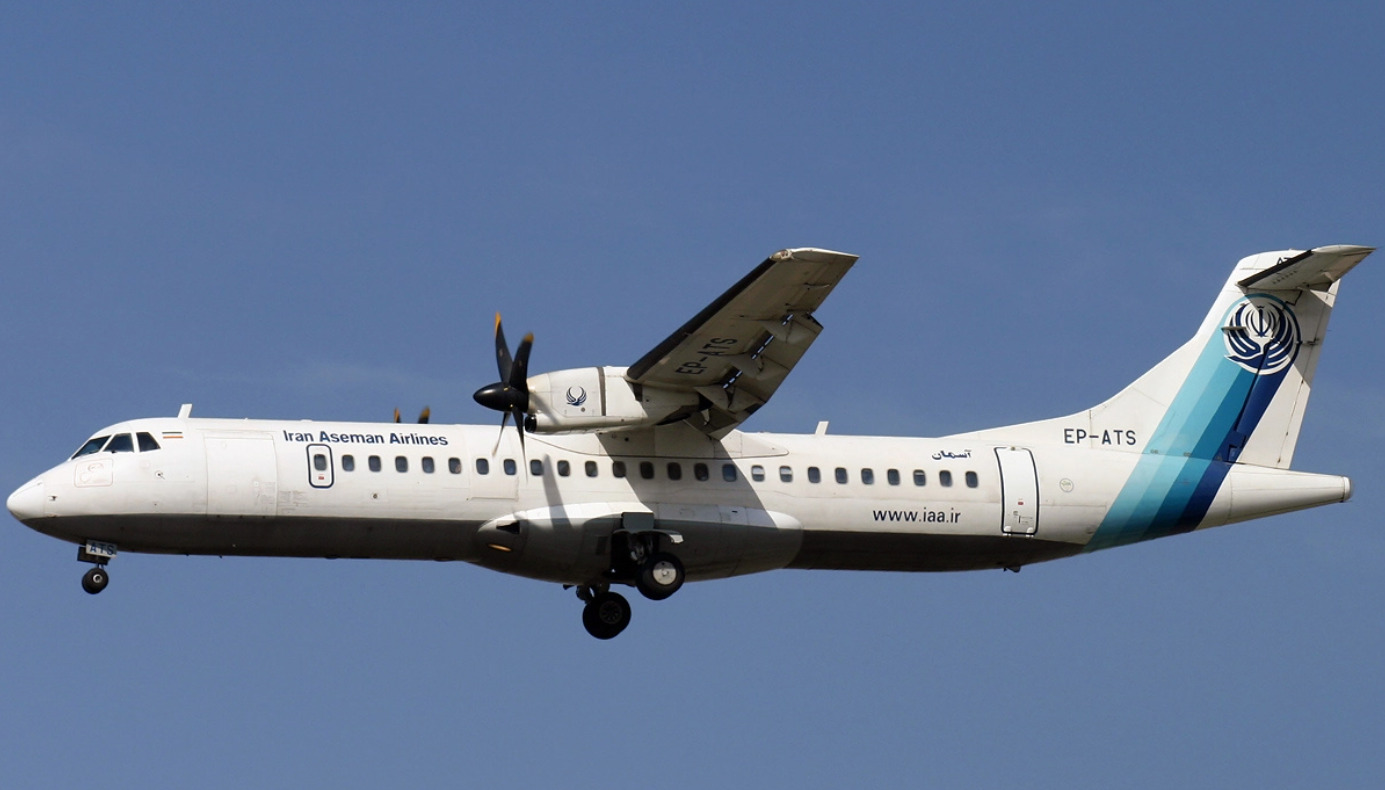
- EP-ATS, the aircraft involved, photographed in 2010

Accident
- Date: 18 February 2018
- Summary: Stalled and crashed in adverse weather conditions
- Site: Dena Massif, Zagros Mountains, near Yasuj Airport, Yasuj, Iran; 30°49′25″N 51°36′56″E

Aircraft
- Aircraft type: ATR 72-212
- Operator: Iran Aseman Airlines
- IATA flight No.: EP3704
- ICAO flight No.: IRC3704
- Call sign: ASEMAN 3704
- Registration: EP-ATS
- Flight origin: Mehrabad International Airport, Tehran, Iran
- Destination: Yasuj Airport, Yasuj, Iran
- Occupants: 66
- Passengers: 60
- Crew: 6
- Fatalities: 66
- Survivors: 0

Aseman Airlines Flight 3704's flight route

Iran Aseman Airlines Flight 3704 was a scheduled Iranian domestic passenger flight from Iranian capital Tehran Mehrabad International Airport to Yasuj in southwest Iran. On 18 February 2018, during its approach to Yasuj, the aircraft serving the flight, an ATR 72-212 operated by Iran Aseman Airlines, crashed into Mount Dena in the Zagros Mountains near Noqol village in Semirom county, Isfahan Province. All 66 people on board, including 60 passengers and 6 crew members, were killed.

According to the final report, which was published on 15 June 2020 by the Iranian Civil Aviation Organization (CAO), the accident was caused by multiple factors, with pilot error considered as the main cause. The investigation showed that the crew decided to continue to Yasuj despite deteriorating weather conditions in the area. During its approach, the crew elected to descend below the minimum altitude. The resulting bad weather caused the aircraft to stall. The crew failed to recover the aircraft from the stall and the aircraft crashed onto the mountain.

The crash highlighted the danger of mountain waves and the aviation industry's lack of awareness of the issue. The Iranian CAO published several recommendations to ICAO and the European Aviation Safety Agency to address the hazard that a mountain wave may pose to the safety of a flight. Subsequently, the crash also led to changes of the weather training programs for airliners in Iran.

== Accident ==
The aircraft was operating a domestic scheduled passenger flight from Iranian capital Tehran Mehrabad International Airport to Yasuj Airport in Yasuj, the capital of Kohgiluyeh and Boyer-Ahmad Province in southwest Iran. The flight was supposed to take about 50 minutes. It took off from Tehran with 60 passengers and 6 crew members on 18 February 2018 at about 04:35 UTC.

At 05:49 UTC, as Flight 3704 approached Yasuj, the flight crew asked the meteorological information in Yasuj. Yasuj Tower later informed Flight 3704 about the weather condition and mentioned that the final approach path was clear. The flight later was cleared to descent to FL170 by Tehran and was handed over to Yasuj on 05:53 UTC.

The crew stated that they would continue the approach with FL150. At 05:55, the crew reported that they were 25 miles from the destination airport. Yasuj Tower then told the pilot about the updated condition in Yasuj, stating that clouds were slowly moving to the south. Four minutes later, Yasuj asked the flight again and the crew responded that they failed to receive the signal of Distance Measuring Equipment (DME) from their navigational device. The crew then checked about the weather condition in the area again.

At 06:04 UTC, Yasuj Tower lost communication contact with Flight 3704. Attempts had been made to re-establish communication with the aircraft but failed.

According to flight tracking website Flightradar24, the last signal from the aircraft was received just before 05:56 UTC, descending from an altitude of 16,975 feet (5,174 m).

== Aircraft ==
The aircraft involved was an ATR 72-212 with MSN 391. It was registered EP-ATS and was delivered to Iran Aseman Airlines in 1993. No serious incidents were reported during the aircraft's service with the airline.

At the time of the accident, Iran Aseman had six ATR aircraft in its fleet, three of which were in operation.

== Passengers and crew ==
It was initially reported that 59 passengers and six crew members were presumed to be on board. It was later revealed that there were 60 passengers and six crew members aboard. The flight manifest was consisted of 65 adults and 1 child. There were 60 passengers, 2 security guards, 2 flight attendants and 2 flight crew members.

The captain of the flight was identified as 62-year old Hojatollah Foolad. He had accumulated a total flying hours of more than 17,000 hours, of which 12,000 hours were on the type. The pilot also had experience of flying in India from 2002 to 2007, before returning to Iran Aseman Airlines. At least 2 flights to Yasuj had been performed 3 months prior to the accident. His flying certificate was deemed as valid.

The co-pilot was identified as 36-year old First Officer Kaveh Khalili with a total flying hours of approximately 1,800 flying hours, including 197 hours on the type.

== Search ==
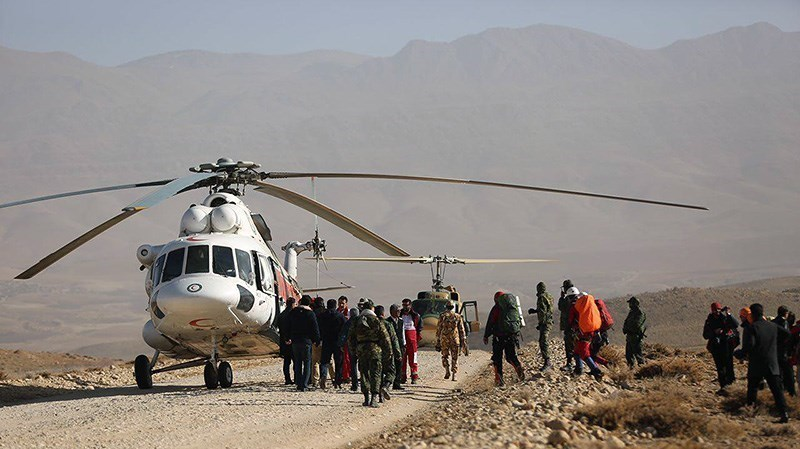
Helicopters were deployed to search for the missing aircraft

Locals reported that they had heard the aircraft hit the mountain. Iranian authorities in neighboring Shiraz and Isfahan province had deployed two of their helicopters to the crash site. A total of 12 search and rescue teams had been dispatched to Mount Dena, but due to foggy conditions, rescue helicopters could not reach the crash site in the Zagros Mountains. Mount Dena, the location of the crash site, is actually a mountain range within the Zagros Mountains; it is 80 kilometres (50 mi; 40 nmi) long with several peaks, the highest of which is 4,409 metres (14,465 ft) above sea level.

Spokesman from Iran Aseman Airlines initially stated that all 66 passengers and crews on board had been killed in the accident. However, this statement was later retracted by the airline and the airline later issued a statement saying that it could not "accurately and definitely confirm" that everyone had died in the crash.

In response to the crash, crisis centres were set up in Tehran, Isfahan, Fars and Yasuj. Weather conditions at the crash site, including snow and strong winds, were hampering search and rescue services. The Red Crescent Society announced that a drone would be flown to the area due to the severe weather condition which prevented helicopters to reach the crash site. Search and rescue team announced on 19 February that at least 5 helicopters had been prepared for the search operation. Troops with search dogs were deployed to hike the mountain and to search the area on foot. Search and rescue operation via air was stopped for the second time due to bad weather conditions. Reports that the wreckage had been found at an elevation of 11,482 feet were refuted by officials from the Iranian Red Crescent and Iranian investigators.

On 20 February 2018, helicopters from Islamic Revolutionary Guard Corps (IRGC) made note of the wreckage and debris from the aircraft. Another military helicopter sighted the wreckage and pinpointed the crash site near Noqol. The aircraft was obliterated, with large portion of the tail cone, the vertical stabilizer, the rudder and the empennage were found. Scattered bodies could be seen around the wreckage. No survivors were seen at the crash site. All 60 passengers and 6 crew members on board died.

As helicopters were unable to land on the crash site, the recovery of the victims had to be done on foot. Officials stated that the bodies had to be carried on the rescuers' backs to the mountain foot. The head of the country's emergency services said that the recovery of the victims would be challenging due to the adverse weather. As of 21 February, at least 32 bodies had been recovered from the crash site.

On 3 March, Iranian officials announced they had found the flight recorders.

== Investigation ==
President of Iran Hassan Rouhani ordered Iranian Minister of Roads and Urban Development Abbas Ahmad Akhoundi to lead the investigation. Iran's Civil Aviation Organization (CAO) investigated the cause of the crash. The French Bureau of Enquiry and Analysis for Civil Aviation Safety (BEA) also sent 7 delegations to investigate the crash. The aircraft's manufacturer, ATR, sent 4 people to Iran to assist with the investigation.

Initial assessment didn't find any abnormalities on the aircraft's structure. Flight control failure and power system malfunctions were also not reported by the crew. The assessment did, however, reveal that the flight had entered cloud with icing condition prior to its landing. The flight crew tried to fly in an unallowable altitude to get out from the cloud and reached an unsafe altitude. As the aircraft was flying at the altitude, it encountered a series of updraft and downdraft, its airspeed decayed and it then entered a dangerous stall condition.

=== Weather ===
Data on the weather condition in the area were collected from the Iranian Meteorological Agency and from the airport dispatcher. Data were also provided from interviews of numerous individuals including pilots who had flown from and to Yasuj. Additionally, the Iranian counterpart was also assisted by the French METEO-SAT.

METAR report retrieved by Iranian investigators showed that, during the dispatch of Flight 3704, the weather didn't meet the minimum criteria for a flight to Yasuj. Yasuj Airport is listed in the airline's operation manual as an airport with a minimum ceiling for an approach and landing at 11,000 ft. The ceiling at the time was broken (clouds cover at least 5/8 – 7/8 of the sky) with clouds reported at 9,000 ft. The report further stated that the condition in Yasuj would later deteriorate as cumulonimbus clouds were observed in the area, with thunderstorm, rain and hail would also occur. As the weather condition didn't meet the criteria, the crews of Flight 3704 should have diverted the aircraft to Isfahan in the north or Shiraz in the south.

As the flight path included mountainous terrain in the route, Flight 3704 would counter a mountain wave phenomena in the area. A mountain wave is a form of a Lee wave that is resulted by a disturbance on the horizontal air flow. Mountain wave may pose threat to the safety of a flight as it can lead to severe turbulence, icing, strong windshear, and updraft and downdraft motion to the aircraft. The high elevation of the mountain at the flight path indicated that the mountain wave was a hazard for the safety of the flight. To counter the phenomenon safely, the flight crews should’ve flown the aircraft at a minimum airspeed while monitoring the airspeed closely to prevent a stall condition.

An illustration of a mountain wave

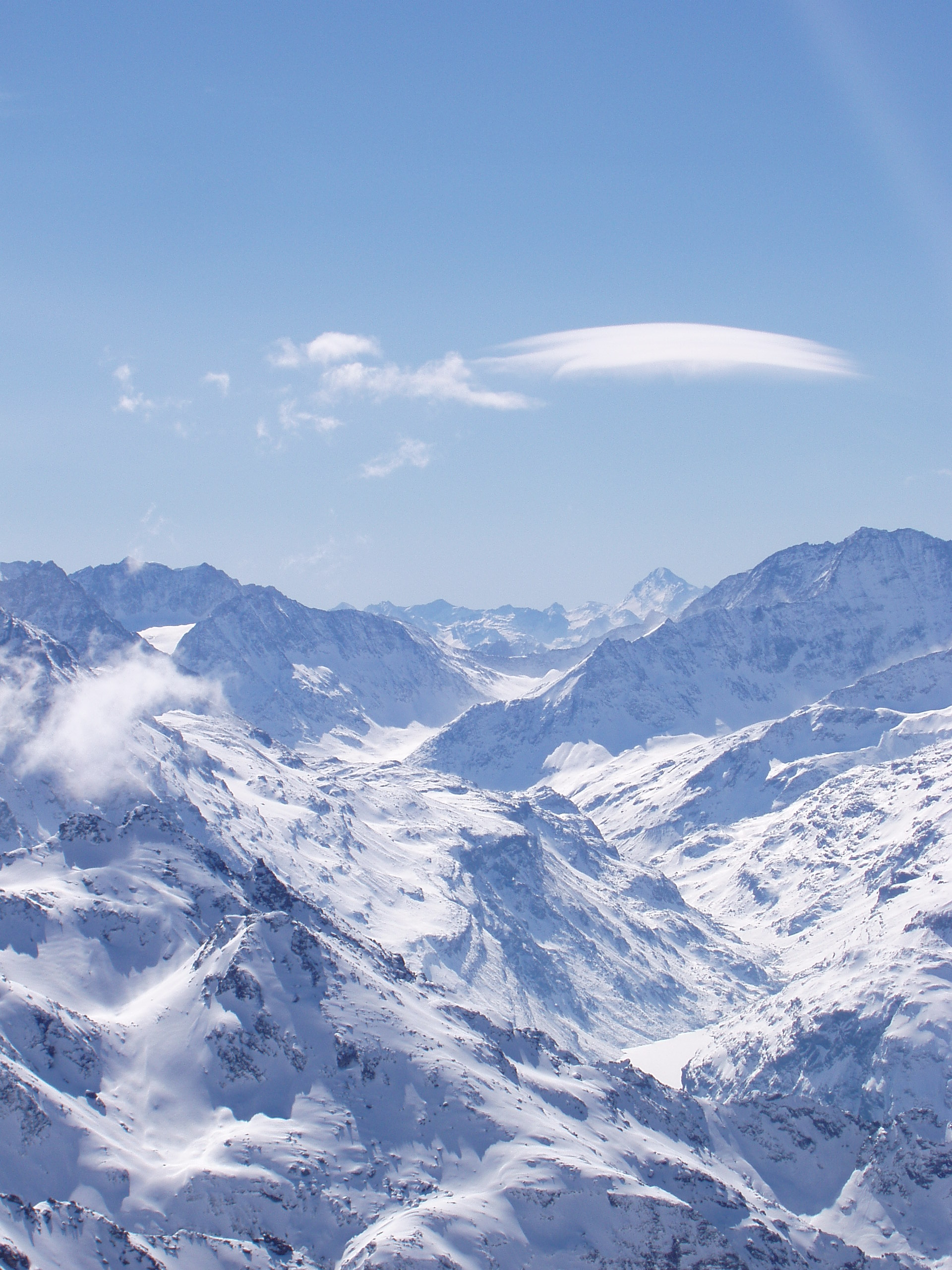
A lenticularis cloud (right) which was formed by a mountain wave, seen here over the Alps

Analysis on Flight 3704's FDR confirmed that the aircraft indeed had encountered mountain wave. The data revealed that the flight encountered an updraft and a downdraft motion created by the phenomenon.

Further analysis by Iran Meteorological Report stated that an unstable layer, turbulence and freezing level at an altitude of 11,000 ft were predicted. French Meteorological Agency stated that the weather condition in the area of the accident at the time was favorable for severe icing condition. However, even though severe icing condition was present at the time, the Aircraft Performance Monitoring (APM) simulation of the flight conducted by investigators suggested that the aircraft's decrease of performance was more likely caused by external gradient such as wind. The mountain wave in the area caused a vertical wind with speed as high as 3,000 ft/min. The simulation revealed that as the aircraft flew over the mountain, a downdraft struck the aircraft and the nose pitch increased to maintain the flight altitude.

As it entered a stall condition, the crew then made a nose down pitch to counter it. The EGPWS was later activated until the end of the flight.

=== Crew performance ===
The assessment of both pilots' behavior prior to their flights didn't indicate any abnormalities. Investigators, however, did find that the crews had never been trained on how to execute an appropriate response when a mountain wave struck the aircraft. The crew was not familiar with mountain wave and the manual also didn't provide information regarding the phenomenon. The ATR simulation also did not provide the crews with simulation on handling a mountain wave.

Prior to its approach to Mount Dena, the First Officer of Flight 3704 had made several recommendations to the Captain on several instances. The Captain didn't respond at any of the given recommendations and decided to ignore it. The lack of communication between the Captain and the First Officer indicated a steep authority gradient phenomenon in aviation, which may be caused due to difference in flying experience.

It was evident that the crew of Flight 3704 had deviated from its operating manual. During Flight 3704's approach to Mount Dena, the ATC had given clearance for the flight to fly at FL170. ATC later informed the crew that the ceiling was at 15,000 ft. The CVR recording revealed that the crew decided to descend further to an elevation of 15,000 ft so that the aircraft would get out of clouds. The minimum altitude for the airport however was 15,500 ft, so the crew was going to fly under the approved minimum altitude.

During its descent, the aircraft encountered an updraft and later a downdraft. The downdraft was strong enough to cause the nose pitch to rise. As the pitch was increased by the force of the downdraft, the airspeed decreased and the drag force increased accordingly, risking a stall condition to occur. As the power lever was increased to counter the low speed of the aircraft, the pitch kept increasing and the airspeed kept decreasing, at one point reaching 118 knots. The nose pitch reached +15 degree. While the crew tried to counter the stall condition by bringing the nose down, the crew didn't execute the recovery properly. The engine was not in full power and the flaps were not set to 15 degree. It was presumed that the crew didn't expect to encounter a mountain wave phenomenon in the area and thus this might have decreased their situational awareness. As the pilots tried to save the aircraft by bringing the nose down, there was no more altitude left for a safe recovery.

=== Conclusion ===
The Iranian Civil Aviation Organization published the interim report, with the following:

The accident happened due to many chains of considered causes but the human factor had main role in the conclusion of the scenario. The cockpit crew action which has caused dangerous conditions for the flight is considered as the main cause. Based on provided evidences as follows:

- Continuing to the Yasuj airport for landing against Operation manual of the Company, due to low altitude ceiling of the cloud and related cloud mass. They should have diverted to an alternate airport.
- Descending to unauthorized altitude below minimum of the route and MSA
- Lack of enough CRM during flight
- Failure to complete the stall recovery
- Inappropriate use of autopilot after stall condition
- Inadequate anticipation for bad weather based on Operating Manual
- Quick action to switch off anti-ice system and Angle of Attack
- Failure to follow the Check lists and standard call out by both pilots

The investigation also noted that, while mountain wave phenomenon rarely cause an aircraft to crash, the phenomenon is rarely, if not ever, addressed to pilots. Many pilots are unaware of the phenomenon and flight manuals did not educate pilots enough on the matter.

The Iranian CAO issued 28 recommendations in response to the crash. Among the recommendations were:

- ICAO should include the hazard of mountain wave in every flight manual and also should make sure that the retrieval of essential aircraft parts are not affected by an economic embargo
- EASA should revise the stall recovery procedure of the ATR 72-212
- Iran CAO should develop an Aviation Search and Rescue program to ensure a better coordination with the search and rescue operation
- Every airline in Iran should include a training program which address the hazards of mountain wave.

The final report was published on 15 June 2020. It was almost identical to the interim report albeit with reworded conclusions and included comments from the BEA.

== Aftermath and reactions ==
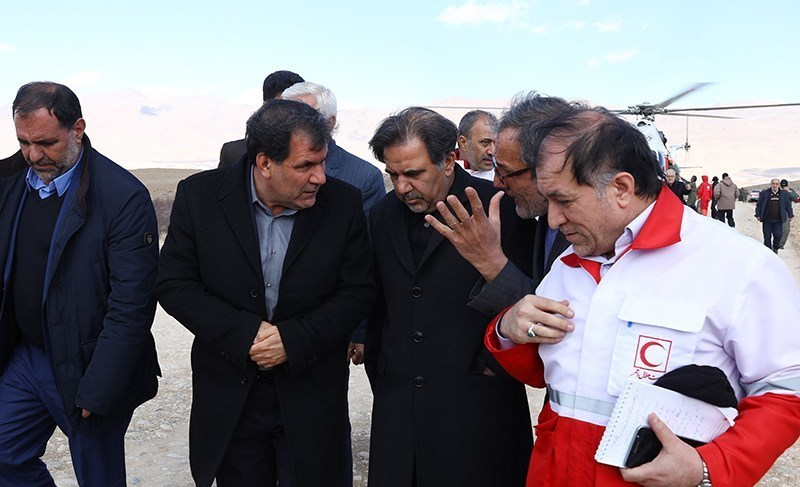
Iranian Minister of Roads and Urban Development Abbas Akhoundi observed the search and rescue operation.

On 23 February 2018, the Iran Civil Aviation Organization temporarily suspended the operation of Iran Aseman Airlines' ATR 72 aircraft.

The search and rescue operation was viewed as too long by some family members, some were angered due to the incompetent handling of the disaster. On 19 February, more than 100 people reportedly protested outside a government building in Dena Kooh, demanding Iranian officials to step down due to the response on the disaster.

Journalists have speculated that the economic sanctions against Iran which have prevented Iranian airlines from obtaining new planes and spare parts and forced them to operate aging aircraft may have contributed to the cause of the crash. Iranian judicial authorities and the special committee of the Islamic Consultative Assembly believed that the flight should not have been allowed in the first place, and blamed the Iran Aseman Airlines for the accident. Iranian Parliament investigation report on the incident, released on 18/5/2020, blamed Iranian Civil Aviation Organization and Aseman Airlines on the incident. The parliament report also accuses the manufacturer of the aircraft for not providing spare parts for the maintenance of the aircraft.

One of the victims of the crash was Hadi Fahimi, an Iranian conservation biologist. In 2020, a newly discovered species of brine shrimp (Phallocryptus fahimii) was named in his honor by researchers in Zoology in the Middle East, recognizing his contributions to biodiversity studies in Iran.
