= Qanat-e Kifteh =

Village in Isfahan province, Iran

Qanat-e Kifteh Persian: قنات كيفته
- Village
- Location within Iran
- Coordinates: 31°03′33″N 51°38′30″E
- Country: Iran
- Province: Isfahan
- County: Semirom
- District: Padena
- Rural District: Padena-ye Vosta

Population (2016)
  - Total: 594
- Time zone: UTC+3:30 (IRST)

Qanat-e Kifteh (Persian: قنات كيفته) (Note: Also romanized as Qanāt Kīfteh and Qanāt-e Kīfteh; also known as Qanāt Gīfteh Gīveh Sīn Bālā, Qanāt-e Gīfteh, and Qanāt-e Kīfteh Gīvsīn) is a village in Padena-ye Vosta Rural District of Padena District in Semirom County, Isfahan province, Iran.

== Demographics ==
=== Population ===
At the time of the 2006 National Census, the village's population was 511 in 118 households. The following census in 2011 counted 483 people in 132 households. The 2016 census measured the population of the village as 594 people in 171 households.
