= Kifteh Giveh Sin =

Village in Isfahan province, Iran

Kifteh Giveh Sin Persian: كيفته گيوه سين
- Village
- Location within Iran
- Coordinates: 31°03′06″N 51°38′46″E
- Country: Iran
- Province: Isfahan
- County: Semirom
- District: Padena
- Rural District: Padena-ye Vosta

Population (2016)
  - Total: 1,260
- Time zone: UTC+3:30 (IRST)

Kifteh Giveh Sin (Persian: كيفته گيوه سين) (Note: Also romanized as Kīfteh Gīveh Sīn; also known as Kīfteh Gīv Sīn) is a village in Padena-ye Vosta Rural District of Padena District in Semirom County, Isfahan province, Iran.

== Demographics ==
=== Population ===
At the time of the 2006 National Census, the village's population was 1,396 in 281 households. The following census in 2011 counted 1,197 people in 326 households. The 2016 census measured the population of the village as 1,260 people in 352 households, the most populous in its rural district.
