= Didejan =

Village in Isfahan province, Iran

Didejan Persian: ديدجان
- Village
- Location within Iran
- Coordinates: 31°03′52″N 51°37′05″E
- Country: Iran
- Province: Isfahan
- County: Semirom
- District: Padena
- Rural District: Padena-ye Vosta

Population (2016)
  - Total: 167
- Time zone: UTC+3:30 (IRST)

Didejan (Persian: ديدجان) (Note: Also romanized as Dīdejān; also known as Dīdeh Jān) is a village in Padena-ye Vosta Rural District of Padena District in Semirom County, Isfahan province, Iran.

== Demographics ==
=== Population ===
At the time of the 2006 National Census, the village's population was 161 in 35 households. The following census in 2011 counted 151 people in 41 households. The 2016 census measured the population of the village as 167 people in 55 households.
