= Arababad, Isfahan =

Village in Isfahan province, Iran

Arababad Persian: عرب آباد
- Village
- Location within Iran
- Coordinates: 31°04′24″N 51°30′18″E
- Country: Iran
- Province: Isfahan
- County: Semirom
- District: Padena
- Rural District: Padena-ye Vosta

Population (2016)
  - Total: 197
- Time zone: UTC+3:30 (IRST)

Arababad (Persian: عرب آباد) (Note: Also romanized as ‘Arabābād; formerly known as Arabshah (عرب شاه), also romanized as ‘Arabshāh; also known as ‘Arabshā) is a village in Padena-ye Vosta Rural District of Padena District in Semirom County, Isfahan province, Iran.

== Demographics ==
=== Population ===
At the time of the 2006 National Census, the village's population was 102 in 28 households. The following census in 2011 counted 112 people in 34 households. The 2016 census measured the population of the village as 197 people in 60 households.
