= Khafr, Semirom =

Village in Isfahan province, Iran

Khafr Persian: خفر
- Village
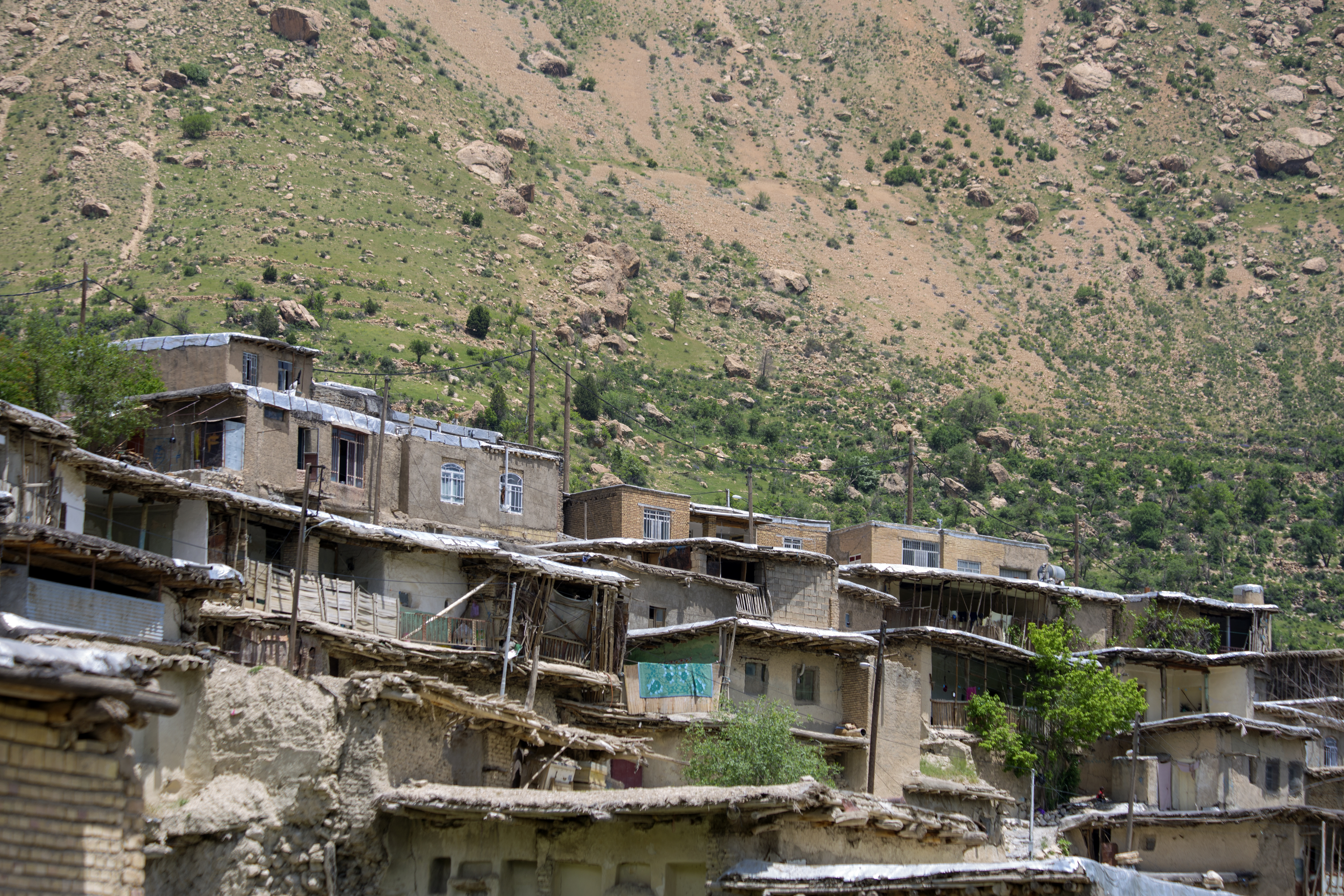
- The village of Khafr

- Location within Iran
- Coordinates: 30°59′54″N 51°29′00″E
- Country: Iran
- Province: Isfahan
- County: Semirom
- District: Padena
- Rural District: Padena-ye Vosta

Population (2016)
  - Total: 1,034
- Time zone: UTC+3:30 (IRST)

Khafr (Persian: خفر) (Note: Also known as Khafār) is a village in Padena-ye Vosta Rural District of Padena District in Semirom County, Isfahan province, Iran.

== Demographics ==
=== Population ===
At the time of the 2006 National Census, the village's population was 1,396 in 406 households. The following census in 2011 counted 1,178 people in 382 households. The 2016 census measured the population of the village as 1,034 people in 352 households.

== See also ==
Media related to Khafr, Semirom at Wikimedia Commons
