= Bideh =

Village in Isfahan province, Iran

Bideh Persian: بيده
- Village
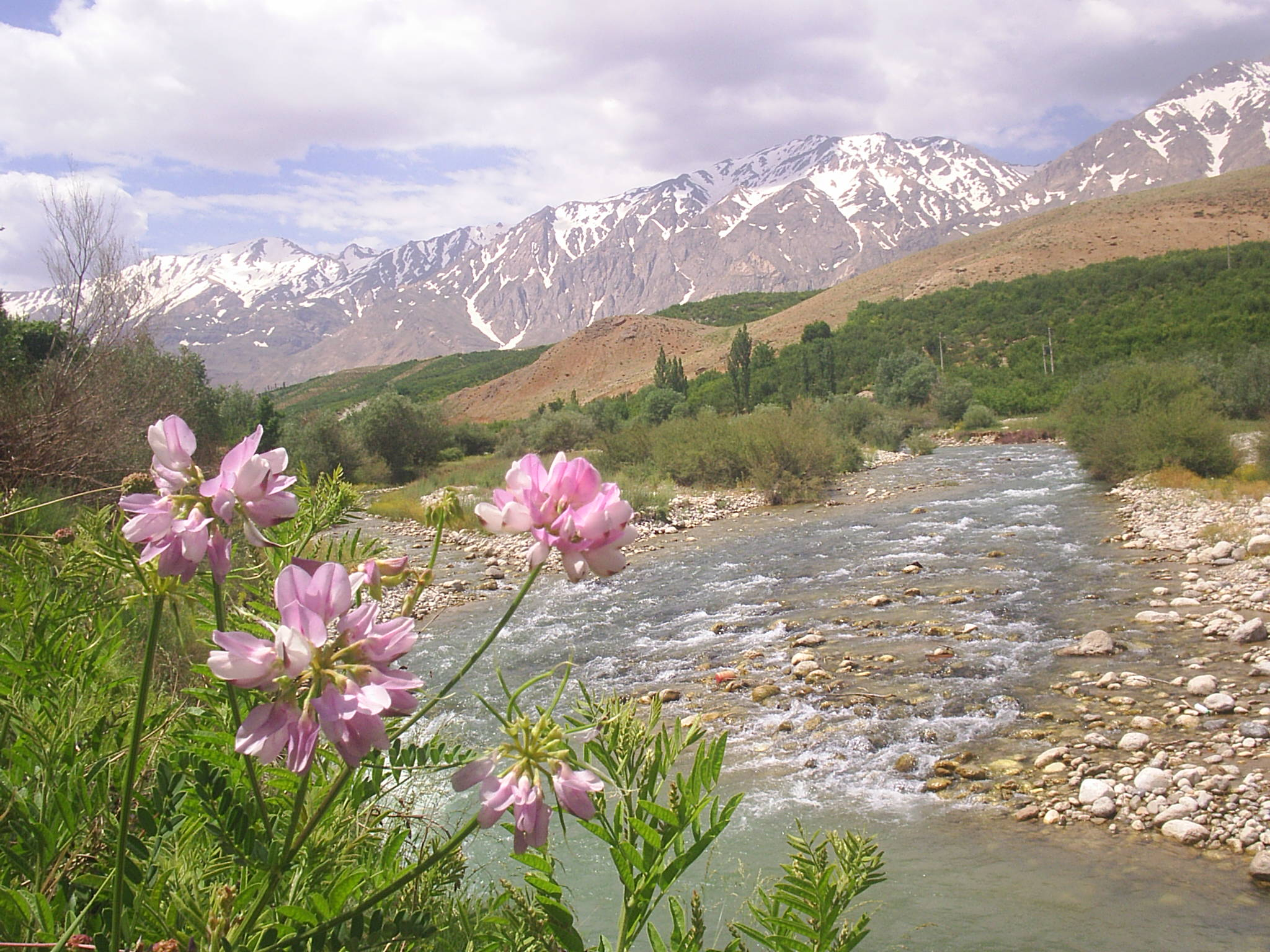

- Location within Iran
- Coordinates: 30°56′52″N 51°39′09″E
- Country: Iran
- Province: Isfahan
- County: Semirom
- District: Padena-ye Olya
- Rural District: Padena-ye Olya

Population (2016)
  - Total: 1,618
- Time zone: UTC+3:30 (IRST)

Bideh (Persian: بيده) is a village in Padena-ye Olya Rural District of Padena-ye Olya District (Note: Formerly Danakuh Rural District) in Semirom County, Isfahan province, Iran, serving as capital of both the district and the rural district.

== Demographics ==
=== Population ===
At the time of the 2006 National Census, the village's population was 1,245 in 297 households, when it was in Padena District. The following census in 2011 counted 1,674 people in 359 households. The 2016 census measured the population of the village as 1,618 people in 439 households, by which time the rural district had been separated from the district in the formation of Danakuh District. (Note: Renamed Padena-ye Olya District) Bideh was the most populous village in its rural district.
