= Khak Daneh =

Village in Isfahan province, Iran

Khak Daneh Persian: خاكدانه
- Village
- Location within Iran
- Coordinates: 31°03′57″N 51°30′54″E
- Country: Iran
- Province: Isfahan
- County: Semirom
- District: Padena
- Rural District: Padena-ye Vosta

Population (2016)
  - Total: 111
- Time zone: UTC+3:30 (IRST)

Khak Daneh (Persian: خاكدانه) (Note: Also romanized as Khāk Dāneh) is a village in Padena-ye Vosta Rural District of Padena District in Semirom County, Isfahan province, Iran.

== Demographics ==
=== Population ===
At the time of the 2006 National Census, the village's population was 84 in 29 households. The following census in 2011 counted 108 people in 37 households. The 2016 census measured the population of the village as 111 people in 39 households.
