= Ab Garmak, Isfahan =

Village in Isfahan province, Iran

Ab Garmak Persian: اب گرمك
- Village
- Location within Iran
- Coordinates: 31°08′53″N 51°25′33″E
- Country: Iran
- Province: Isfahan
- County: Semirom
- District: Padena
- Rural District: Padena-ye Sofla

Population (2016)
  - Total: 183
- Time zone: UTC+3:30 (IRST)

Ab Garmak (Persian: اب گرمك) (Note: Also romanized as Āb Garmak) is a village in Padena-ye Sofla Rural District of Padena District in Semirom County, Isfahan province, Iran.

== Demographics ==
=== Population ===
At the time of the 2006 National Census, the village's population was 140 in 35 households. The following census in 2011 counted 152 people in 46 households. The 2016 census measured the population of the village as 183 people in 57 households.
