= Ab Malakh waterfalls =

Village in Isfahan province, Iran

Ab Malakh Persian: اب ملخ
- Village
- Location within Iran
- Coordinates: 31°08′27″N 51°22′08″E
- Country: Iran
- Province: Isfahan
- County: Semirom
- District: Padena
- Rural District: Padena-ye Sofla

Population (2016)
  - Total: 75
- Time zone: UTC+3:30 (IRST)

The Ab Malakh waterfalls (Persian: آبشار آب ملخ) (Note: Romanized as Ābshār-e Āb Malakh; (English: "locust water waterfall")) are a set of waterfalls near the village of Ab Malakh in Padena-ye Sofla Rural District of Padena District in Semirom County, Isfahan province, Iran. According to local legend, the waterfalls have water that can be used to kill locusts due to the chemical contents of the water.

The waterfalls are also known as Takht-e Soleiman, or "the seat of Soleiman." The waterfall overflows into the Ab Malakh river at both ends of a tunnel through which the river flows. The waterfall was reported to be threatened by local development in 2014.

== Ab Malakh village ==
Ab Malakh (اب ملخ) (Note: Also romanized as Āb Malakh) is the village in Padena-ye Sofla Rural District near the waterfalls.

=== Population ===
At the time of the 2006 National Census, the village's population was below the reporting threshold. The following census in 2011 counted five people in four households. The 2016 census measured the population of the village as 75 people in 32 households.
