= Barand-e Sofla =

Village in Isfahan province, Iran

Barand-e Sofla Persian: بارندسفلي
- Village
- Location within Iran
- Coordinates: 30°57′07″N 51°37′57″E
- Country: Iran
- Province: Isfahan
- County: Semirom
- District: Padena-ye Olya
- Rural District: Padena-ye Olya

Population (2016)
  - Total: 514
- Time zone: UTC+3:30 (IRST)

Barand-e Sofla (Persian: بارندسفلي) (Note: Also romanized as Bārand-e Soflá; also known as Bārand-e Pā’īn) is a village in Padena-ye Olya Rural District of Padena-ye Olya District (Note: Formerly Danakuh Rural District) in Semirom County, Isfahan province, Iran.

== Demographics ==
=== Population ===
At the time of the 2006 National Census, the village's population was 447 in 108 households, when it was in Padena District. The following census in 2011 counted 410 people in 114 households. The 2016 census measured the population of the village as 514 people in 161 households, by which time the rural district had been separated from the district in the formation of Danakuh District. (Note: Renamed Padena-ye Olya District)
