= Tang-e Khoshk, Isfahan =

Village in Isfahan province, Iran

Tang-e Khoshk Persian: تنگ خشك
- Village
- Location within Iran
- Coordinates: 31°10′36″N 51°27′02″E
- Country: Iran
- Province: Isfahan
- County: Semirom
- District: Padena
- Rural District: Padena-ye Sofla

Population (2016)
  - Total: 338
- Time zone: UTC+3:30 (IRST)

Tang-e Khoshk (Persian: تنگ خشك) is a village in Padena-ye Sofla Rural District of Padena District in Semirom County, Isfahan province, Iran.

== Demographics ==
=== Population ===
At the time of the 2006 National Census, the village's population was 244 in 64 households. The following census in 2011 counted 219 people in 76 households. The 2016 census measured the population of the village as 338 people in 102 households.
