= Komeh =

City in Isfahan province, Iran

Komeh Persian: كمه
- City
- Location within Iran
- Coordinates: 31°03′50″N 51°35′39″E
- Country: Iran
- Province: Isfahan
- County: Semirom
- District: Padena

Population (2016)
  - Total: 2,184
- Time zone: UTC+3:30 (IRST)

Komeh (Persian: كمه) (Note: Also romanized as Kommeh; also known as Bakhsh-e Kommeh) is a city in, and the capital of, Padena District in Semirom County, Isfahan province, Iran. It also serves as the administrative center for Padena-ye Vosta Rural District.

== Demographics ==
=== Population ===
At the time of the 2006 National Census, the city's population was 2,305 in 551 households. The following census in 2011 counted 2,146 people in 576 households. The 2016 census measured the population of the city as 2,184 people in 661 households.
