= Tang-e Khoshk, Kohgiluyeh and Boyer-Ahmad =

Tang-e Khoshk تنگ خشك
- Village
- Location within Iran
- Coordinates: 30°26′14″N 51°46′40″E
- Country: Iran
- Province: Kohgiluyeh and Boyer-Ahmad
- County: Boyer-Ahmad
- Bakhsh: Central
- Rural District: Sarrud-e Jonubi

Population (2006)
  - Total: 201
- Time zone: UTC+3:30 (IRST)
  - Summer (DST): UTC+4:30 (IRDT)

Tang-e Khoshk (Persian: تنگ خشك) is a village in Sarrud-e Jonubi Rural District, in the Central District of Boyer-Ahmad County, Kohgiluyeh and Boyer-Ahmad Province, Iran. At the 2006 census, its population was 201, in 42 families.
