= Tang-e Khoshk, Khuzestan =

Tang-e Khoshk تنگ خشك
- Village
- Location within Iran
- Coordinates: 31°28′27″N 49°55′50″E
- Country: Iran
- Province: Khuzestan
- County: Bagh-e Malek
- Bakhsh: Central
- Rural District: Haparu

Population (2006)
  - Total: 448
- Time zone: UTC+3:30 (IRST)
  - Summer (DST): UTC+4:30 (IRDT)

Tang-e Khoshk (Persian: تنگ خشك; also known as Tang-e Khosh, Tang-e Khoshkī, and Tang-e Khvosh) is a village in Haparu Rural District, in the Central District of Bagh-e Malek County, Khuzestan Province, Iran. At the 2006 census, its population was 448, in 76 families.
