= Ganjegan-e Olya =

Ganjegan-e Olya گنجگان عليا
- Village
- Location within Iran
- Coordinates: 30°27′43″N 51°42′47″E
- Country: Iran
- Province: Kohgiluyeh and Boyer-Ahmad
- County: Boyer-Ahmad
- Bakhsh: Central
- Rural District: Sarrud-e Jonubi

Population (2006)
  - Total: 84
- Time zone: UTC+3:30 (IRST)
  - Summer (DST): UTC+4:30 (IRDT)

Ganjegan-e Olya (Persian: گنجگان عليا, also Romanized as Ganejgān-e ‘Olyā) is a village in Sarrud-e Jonubi Rural District, in the Central District of Boyer-Ahmad County, Kohgiluyeh and Boyer-Ahmad Province, Iran. At the 2006 census, its population was 84, in 18 families.
