= Iran Aseman Airlines Flight 746 =

1994 aviation accident

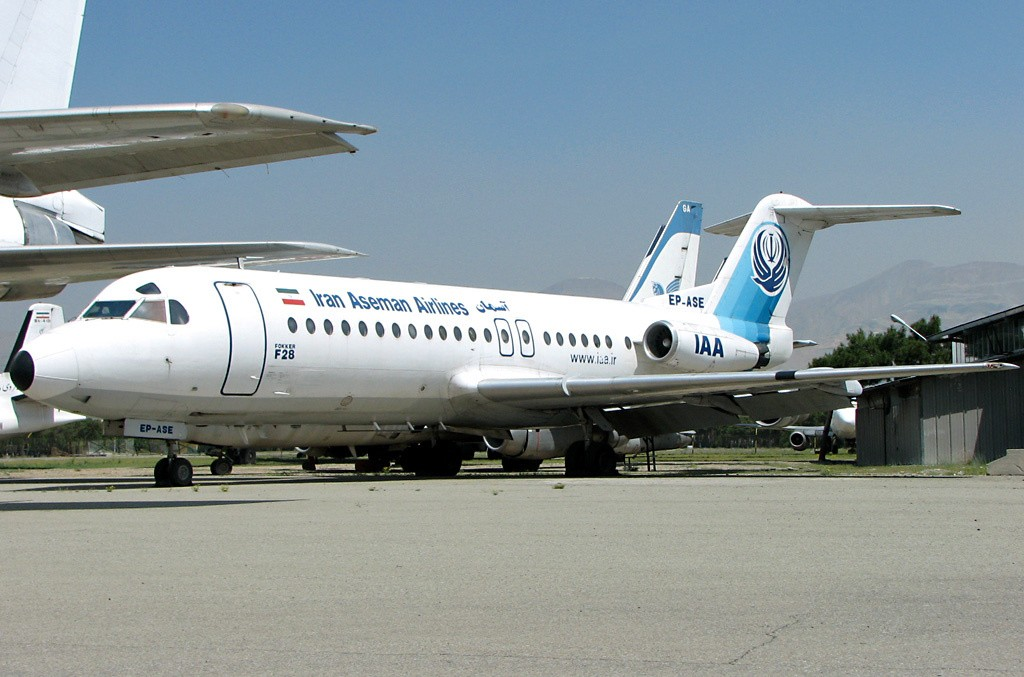
- An Iran Aseman Airlines Fokker F 28

Accident
- Date: 12 October 1994
- Summary: Loss of engine power due to fuel contamination
- Site: Natanz, Iran; 33°30′48″N 51°54′59″E

Aircraft
- Aircraft type: Fokker F28-1000
- Operator: Iran Aseman Airlines
- Registration: EP-PAV
- Flight origin: Isfahan International Airport, Iran
- Destination: Mehrabad International Airport, Iran
- Occupants: 66
- Passengers: 59
- Crew: 7
- Fatalities: 66
- Survivors: 0

Iran Aseman Airlines Flight 746 was a Fokker F-28 flight of Iran Aseman Airlines operating on the Isfahan–Tehran route in Iran. The flight crashed near the town of Natanz on October 12, 1994, killing all the passengers and crew members.

== Crash ==
On 12 October 1994, the flight took off from the Isfahan International Airport destination to Mehrabad International Airport with 59 passengers and seven crew on board. About 35 minutes after take off, both engines lost power and shut down due to contaminated fuel. The aircraft went into an uncontrolled descent; and 47 seconds later Flight 746 crashed into the side of a mountain and exploded. The wreckage was found over an area of 300 square metres (3,200 sq ft) near the town of Natanz. All 59 passengers and 7 crew died in the crash.
