= Padena-ye Sofla Rural District =

Rural district in Isfahan province, Iran

Padena-ye Sofla Rural District Persian: دهستان پادنا سفلي
- Rural District
- Location within Iran
- Coordinates: 31°12′N 51°26′E
- Country: Iran
- Province: Isfahan
- County: Semirom
- District: Padena
- Established: 1987
- Capital: Chahar Rah

Population (2016)
  - Total: 6,193
- Time zone: UTC+3:30 (IRST)

Padena-ye Sofla Rural District (Persian: دهستان پادنا سفلي) is in Padena District of Semirom County, Isfahan province, Iran. Its capital is the village of Chahar Rah.

== Demographics ==
=== Population ===
At the time of the 2006 National Census, the rural district's population was 5,616 in 1,316 households. There were 5,161 inhabitants in 1,544 households at the following census of 2011. The 2016 census measured the population of the rural district as 6,193 in 1,963 households. The most populous of its 15 villages was Saadatabad, with 1,645 people.

=== Other villages in the rural district ===
- Ab Garmak
- Ab Malakh
- Aliabad
- Bi Bi Seyyedan
- Galijeh
- Mandegan
- Qayed Ali
- Rudabad
- Sivar
- Tang-e Khoshk
