= Chabahar Airlines =

Airline based in Tehran, Iran

Chabahar Airlines هواپیمایی چابهار

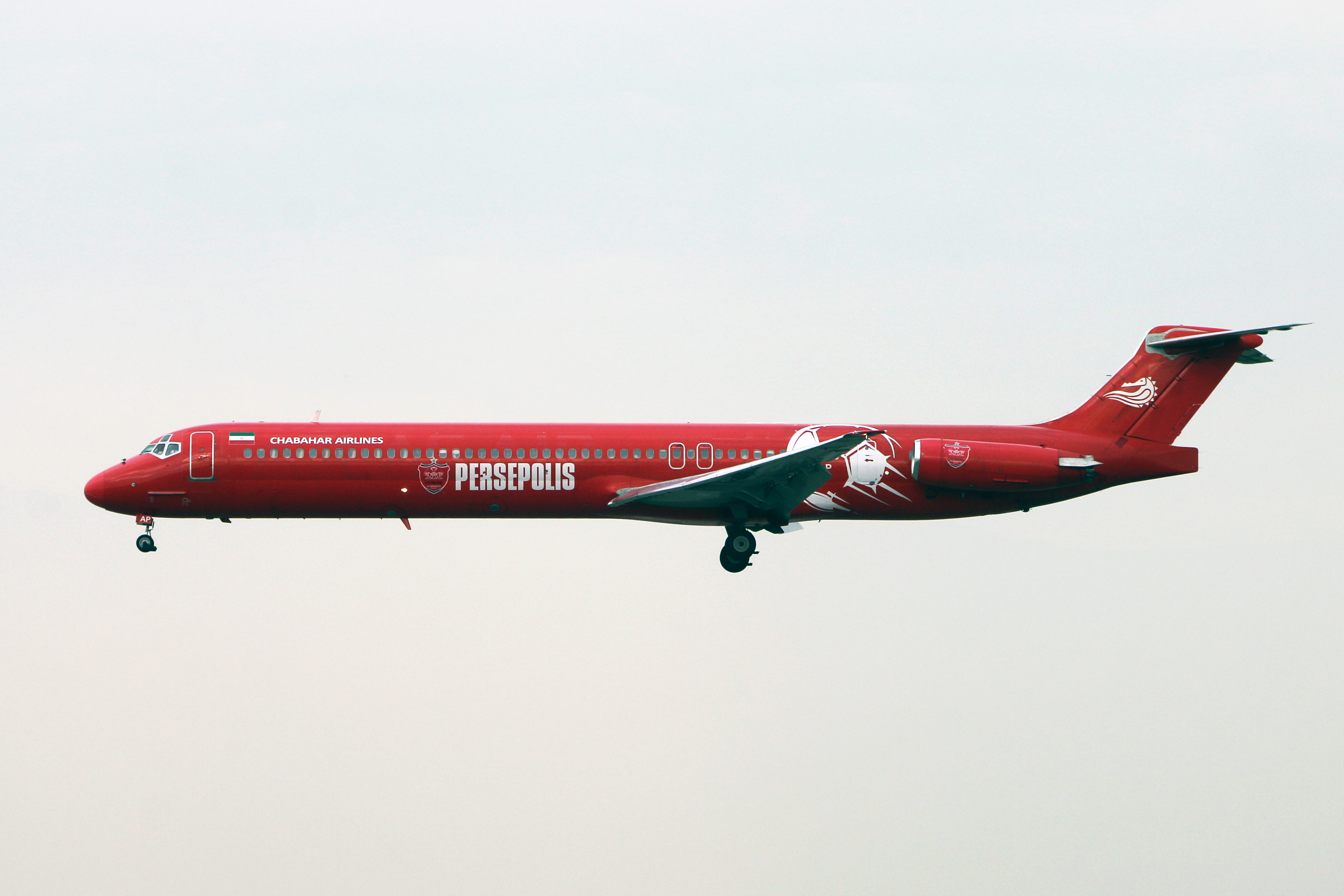
IATA	ICAO	Call sign
-	IRU	CHABAHAR
- Founded: 1999
- Hubs: Tehran Mehrabad International Airport
- Fleet size: 3
- Destinations: 10
- Headquarters: Tehran, Iran
- Employees: 170
- Website: chabaharairlines.com

Chabahar Airlines (Persian: هواپيمايي چابهار, Havâpeymâyi-ye Čâbahâr) is an airline based in Tehran, Iran. Its main base is Mehrabad Airport in the Iranian capital city.

== History ==
Chabahar Airlines was founded in 1999 in Tehran. In 2013 after a grace period the airline became operational again.

In 2022 the airline secured its AOC and began taking steps for launch. In February 2023 Chabahar and Iran Aseman Airlines made an MRO+ deal. On August 13, 2024, it was reported that Chabahar Airlines was eyeing international routes.

== Destinations ==
As of April 2023, Chabahar Airlines serves nine destinations domestically in Iran:

Country	City	Airport	Notes	Refs
Iran	Abadan	Ayatollah Jami International Airport		
Iran	Ahvaz	Qasem Soleimani International Airport		
Iran	Chabahar	Chabahar Konarak Airport		
Iran	Isfahan	Shahid Beheshti International Airport		
Iran	Kish	Kish International Airport		
Iran	Mashhad	Shahid Hasheminejad International Airport		
Iran	Qeshm	Qeshm International Airport		
Iran	Shiraz	Shahid Dastgheib International Airport		
Iran	Tehran	Mehrabad International Airport	Hub	
Iran	Zahedan	Zahedan Airport		

== Fleet ==
=== Current fleet ===
As of July 2026, Chabahar Airlines operates the following aircraft:

Chabahar Airlines Fleet
Aircraft	In service	Orders	Passengers			Notes
Aircraft	In service	Orders	J	Y	Total	Notes
McDonnell Douglas MD-82	2	—	160	0	160	
McDonnell Douglas MD-83	1	—	160	0	160	
Total	3	—				

=== Former fleet ===
As of August 2025, Chabahar Airlines operated 2 McDonnell Douglas MD-82 and 1 McDonnell Douglas MD-83.

The airline also formerly operated the Fokker 100, Ilyushin IL 76, McDonnel Douglas MD 80, Airbus A340 and Boeing 737-400
