= Padena-ye Vosta Rural District =

Rural district in Isfahan province, Iran

Padena-ye Vosta Rural District Persian: دهستان پادنا وسطي
- Rural District
- Location within Iran
- Coordinates: 31°03′N 51°38′E
- Country: Iran
- Province: Isfahan
- County: Semirom
- District: Padena
- Established: 1987
- Capital: Komeh

Population (2016)
  - Total: 5,319
- Time zone: UTC+3:30 (IRST)

Padena-ye Vosta Rural District (Persian: دهستان پادنا وسطي) is in Padena District of Semirom County, Isfahan province, Iran. It is administered from the city of Komeh.

== Demographics ==
=== Population ===
At the time of the 2006 National Census, the rural district's population was 5,435 in 1,327 households. There were 4,837 inhabitants in 1,418 households at the following census of 2011. At the 2016 census, the rural district's population was 5,319 in 1,615 households. The most populous of its 15 villages was Kifteh Giveh Sin, with 1,260 people in 352 households.

=== Other villages in the rural district ===
- Arababad
- Deyli
- Didejan
- Gowd Tappeh
- Khafr
- Khak Daneh
- Khineh
- Murak
- Qanat-e Kifteh
- Saadatabad
