= Padena-ye Olya Rural District =

Rural district in Isfahan province, Iran

Padena-ye Olya Rural District Persian: دهستان پادنا عليا
- Rural District
- Location within Iran
- Coordinates: 30°53′N 51°36′E
- Country: Iran
- Province: Isfahan
- County: Semirom
- District: Padena-ye Olya
- Established: 1987
- Capital: Bideh

Population (2016)
  - Total: 7,751
- Time zone: UTC+3:30 (IRST)

Padena-ye Olya Rural District (Persian: دهستان پادنا عليا) is in Padena-ye Olya District (Note: Formerly Danakuh District) of Semirom County, Isfahan province, Iran. Its capital is the village of Bideh.

== Demographics ==
=== Population ===
At the time of the 2006 National Census, the rural district's population (as a part of Padena District) was 9,844 in 2,225 households. There were 9,589 inhabitants in 2,563 households at the following census of 2011. The 2016 census measured the population of the rural district as 7,751 in 2,212 households, by which time the rural district had been separated from the district in the formation of Danakuh District. (Note: Renamed Padena-ye Olya District) The most populous of its 24 villages was Bideh, with 1,618 people.

=== Other villages in the rural district ===
- Barand-e Olya
- Barand-e Sofla
- Dasht-e Bal
- Deh-e Bozorg
- Dengezlu
- Devergan-e Olya
- Devergan-e Sofla
- Do Rahan
- Kahangan
- Nurabad
- Sarbaz
- Sheybani
- Tall Mohammad
- Zaman Kahriz
