= Padena-ye Olya District =

District in Isfahan province, Iran

Padena-ye Olya District Persian: بخش دناکوه
- District
- Location within Iran
- Coordinates: 30°51′N 51°41′E
- Country: Iran
- Province: Isfahan
- County: Semirom
- Established: 2012
- Capital: Bideh

Population (2016)
  - Total: 12,855
- Time zone: UTC+3:30 (IRST)

Padena-ye Olya District (Persian: بخش پادنا عليا) (Note: Formerly Danakuh District (بخش دناکوه)) is in Semirom County, Isfahan province, Iran. Its capital is the village of Bideh.

== History ==
In 2012, Padena-ye Olya Rural District was separated from Padena District in the formation of Danakuh District. (Note: Renamed Padena-ye Olya District)

== Demographics ==
=== Population ===
At the time of the 2016 National Census, the district's population was 12,855 inhabitants in 3,759 households.

=== Administrative divisions ===
Padena-ye Olya District Population
Administrative Divisions	2016
Baraftab RD	5,104
Padena-ye Olya RD	7,751
Total	12,855
RD = Rural District
