= Padena District =

District in Isfahan province, Iran

Padena District Persian: بخش پادنا
- District
- Location within Iran
- Coordinates: 31°09′N 51°34′E
- Country: Iran
- Province: Isfahan
- County: Semirom
- Capital: Komeh

Population (2016)
  - Total: 13,696
- Time zone: UTC+3:30 (IRST)

Padena District (Persian: بخش پادنا) is in Semirom County, Isfahan province, Iran. Its capital is the city of Komeh.

== History ==
In 2012, Padena-ye Olya Rural District was separated from the district in the formation of Danakuh District. (Note: Renamed Padena-ye Olya District)

== Demographics ==
=== Population ===
At the time of the 2006 National Census, the district's population was 23,200 in 5,419 households. The following census in 2011 counted 21,733 people in 6,101 households. The 2016 census measured the population of the district as 13,696 inhabitants in 4,239 households.

=== Administrative divisions ===
Padena District Population
Administrative Divisions	2006	2011	2016
Padena-ye Olya RD (Note: Transferred to Danakuh District, renamed Padena-ye Olya District)	9,844	9,589	
Padena-ye Sofla RD	5,616	5,161	6,193
Padena-ye Vosta RD	5,435	4,837	5,319
Komeh (city)	2,305	2,146	2,184
Total	23,200	21,733	13,696
RD = Rural District
